= Naoki Inoue =

Japanese mixed martial artist

- Born: 井上直樹; June 14, 1997 (age 29); Toyohashi, Aichi, Japan
- Height: 5 ft 8 in (1.73 m)
- Weight: 125 lb (57 kg; 8.9 st)
- Division: Bantamweight; Flyweight
- Reach: 71 in (180 cm)
- Style: Karate, Brazilian jiu-jitsu
- Fighting out of: Toyohashi, Aichi, Japan
- Team: Hakushinkai Karate; LAW MMA; Sonic Squad
- Rank: Black belt in karate Blue belt in Brazilian jiu-jitsu
- Years active: 2014–present

Mixed martial arts record
- Total: 27
- Wins: 21
- By knockout: 2
- By submission: 9
- By decision: 10
- Losses: 6
- By decision: 6

Other information
- Notable relatives: Mizuki Inoue
- Mixed martial arts record from Sherdog

Naoki Inoue (Japanese: 井上直樹; born 14 June 1997) is a Japanese mixed martial artist competing in the bantamweight division of Rizin Fighting Federation, where he is a former Rizin Bantamweight champion. A professional mixed martial artist since 2014, Inoue has also competed in the Ultimate Fighting Championship.

== Background ==
When Inoue was seven, his parents told him to do some extracurricular activity. He wanted to be strong, therefore he picked martial arts. Inoue received a first-degree black belt in karate and a blue belt in BJJ. He won the J-Network's All-Japan amateur championship as well as won the DEEP Future King (rookie) tournament in 2011.

== Mixed martial arts career ==
=== Early career ===
Inoue made his amateur mixed martial arts debut on February 9, 2014, when he faced Gaku Sakamoto at Deep - Nagoya Impact 2014. He won via first-round submission using an armbar. Following this, Inoue compiled a professional record of 10–0, with wins over Yuya Shibata and Tomohiro Adaniya, before signing with the UFC in the winter of 2017.

=== Ultimate Fighting Championship ===
Inoue made his promotional debut on June 17, 2017, at UFC Fight Night: Holm vs. Correia against Carls John de Tomas. At the weigh-ins Carls John de Tomas came in at 131 lbs, five pounds over the flyweight limit of 126 lbs. As a result, he was fined 30% of the purse, which went to Inoue, and their bout proceeded as scheduled at a catchweight. Inoue won the fight by unanimous decision.

Inoue was expected to face Jenel Lausa on September 23, 2017, at UFC Fight Night 117, but was pulled from the card due to a dislocated shoulder.

Inoue faced Matt Schnell on June 23, 2018, at UFC Fight Night 132. He lost the fight via split decision.

On January 11, 2019, it was reported that Inoue was removed from the UFC roster.

=== Cage Fury FC ===
After departing from the UFC, Inoue faced Sean Santella in a flyweight bout at CFFC 72 on February 16, 2019. He lost the fight via unanimous decision.

=== Return to DEEP ===
Inoue eventually returned to DEEP, facing Toshiaki Kitada at Deep 93 on December 15, 2020. He won the fight via first-round submission.

=== Rizin FF ===
On January 24, 2020, news surfaced that Inoue was scheduled to face Trent Girdham at Rizin 21 – Hamamatsu on February 22, 2020. Inoue won the fight via unanimous decision.

In his sophomore bout in the promotion, Inoue faced Shooto Watanabe at Rizin 22 – Starting Over on August 9, 2020. He won the fight via first-round submission.

Inoue faced Yuki Motoya at Rizin 26 on December 31, 2020. He won the fight by rear naked choke, three minutes into the first round.

==== Rizin Bantamweight Grand Prix 2021 ====
Inoue faced Shintaro Ishiwatari in the opening round of the Bantamweight Grand Prix at Rizin 28 on June 13, 2021. He won the bout via soccer kick knockout in the first round.

Inoue was scheduled to face Yuto Hokamura in the quarterfinals on September 19, 2021, at Rizin 30. He won the fight by unanimous decision.

In the semi-finals, Inoue faced Hiromasa Ougikubo on December 31, 2021, at Rizin 33. He lost the bout via unanimous decision.

==== Later bantamweight career ====
After suffering his first loss under the Rizin banner, Inoue was booked to face Kenta Takizawa at Rizin 37 on July 31, 2022. However, in late July it was reported that Inoue withdrew from the bout citing a knee injury.

Inoue faced Kenta Takizawa on December 31, 2022, at Rizin 40 and won by submission via kimura in the second round.

Inoue faced the former Bellator Bantamweight Champion Juan Archuleta at Rizin 42 on May 6, 2023. He lost the fight by unanimous decision.

Inoue was scheduled to face Shinobu Ota at Rizin Landmark 6 on October 1, 2023. However, Inoue withdrew from the bout due to an unknown reason and was replaced by Shoko Sato.

Inoue faced Shoko Sato at RIZIN Landmark 9 on March 23, 2024. He went on to win the bout via unanimous decision.

==== Rizin Bantamweight champion ====
Inoue faced Kim Soo-chul for the vacant Rizin Bantamweight Championship on September 29, 2024 at Rizin 48. He won the bout via technical knockout in the first round.

In his first title defense, Inoue faced Yuki Motoya on March 29, 2026, at Rizin 50. He won the fight via split decision.

Inoue made his second title defense against Ryuya Fukuda on July 25, 2025, at Super Rizin 4. He won the fight via unanimous decision.

For his third title defense, Inoue faced Danny Sabatello on December 31, 2025, at Rizin: Shiwasu no Cho Tsuwamono Matsuri. He lost the title via split decision.

==== Post-championship ====
Inoue faced Marcirley Alves in a crossover fight between PFL and Rizin on May 23, 2026, at PFL Brussels. He won the fight via split decision.

== Championships and accomplishments ==
=== Mixed martial arts ===
- Rizin Fighting Federation
  - Rizin Bantamweight Championship (One time)
    - Two successful title defenses

== Mixed martial arts record ==
Professional record breakdown
27 matches	21 wins	6 losses
By knockout	2	0
By submission	9	0
By decision	10	6

Res.	Record	Opponent	Method	Event	Date	Round	Time	Location	Notes
Loss		Yrysbek Tilenov	Decision (unanimous)	Rizin 55	November 8, 2026			Funabashi, Japan	
Win	21–5	Marcirley Alves	Decision (split)	PFL Brussels: Habirora vs. Henderson	May 23, 2026	3	5:00	Brussels, Belgium	
Loss	20–5	Danny Sabatello	Decision (split)	Rizin: Shiwasu no Cho Tsuwamono Matsuri	December 31, 2025	3	5:00	Saitama, Japan	Lost the Rizin Bantamweight Championship.
Win	20–4	Ryuya Fukuda	Decision (unanimous)	Super Rizin 4	July 27, 2025	3	5:00	Saitama, Japan	Defended the Rizin Bantamweight Championship.
Win	19–4	Yuki Motoya	Decision (split)	Rizin 50	March 29, 2025	3	5:00	Takamatsu, Japan	Defended the Rizin Bantamweight Championship.
Win	18–4	Soo Chul Kim	TKO (punches)	Rizin 48	September 29, 2024	1	3:55	Saitama, Japan	Won the vacant Rizin Bantamweight Championship.
Win	17–4	Shoko Sato	Decision (unanimous)	Rizin Landmark 9	March 23, 2024	3	5:00	Kobe, Japan	
Loss	16–4	Juan Archuleta	Decision (unanimous)	Rizin 42	May 6, 2023	3	5:00	Tokyo, Japan	
Win	16–3	Kenta Takizawa	Submission (kimura)	Rizin 40	December 31, 2022	2	3:53	Saitama, Japan	
Loss	15–3	Hiromasa Ougikubo	Decision (unanimous)	Rizin 33	December 31, 2021	3	5:00	Saitama, Japan	2021 Rizin Bantamweight Grand Prix Semifinal.
Win	15–2	Yuto Hokamura	Decision (unanimous)	Rizin 30	September 19, 2021	3	5:00	Saitama, Japan	2021 Rizin Bantamweight Grand Prix Quarterfinal.
Win	14–2	Shintaro Ishiwatari	KO (punches and soccer kick)	Rizin 28	June 13, 2021	1	2:01	Tokyo, Japan	2021 Rizin Bantamweight Grand Prix Opening round.
Win	13–2	Yuki Motoya	Submission (rear-naked choke)	Rizin 26	December 31, 2020	1	3:00	Saitama, Japan	
Win	12–2	Shooto Watanabe	Submission (rear-naked choke)	Rizin 22	August 9, 2020	1	1:40	Yokohama, Japan	
Win	11–2	Trent Girdham	Decision (unanimous)	Rizin 21	February 22, 2020	3	5:00	Hamamatsu, Japan	
Win	10–2	Toshiaki Kitada	Submission (rear-naked choke)	DEEP 93 Impact	December 15, 2019	1	2:41	Tokyo, Japan	Bantamweight debut.
Loss	9–2	Sean Santella	Decision (unanimous)	Cage Fury FC 72	February 16, 2019	3	5:00	Atlantic City, New Jersey, United States	
Loss	9–1	Matt Schnell	Decision (split)	UFC Fight Night: Cowboy vs. Edwards	June 23, 2018	3	5:00	Kallang, Singapore	
Win	9–0	Carls John de Tomas	Decision (unanimous)	UFC Fight Night: Holm vs. Correia	June 17, 2017	3	5:00	Kallang, Singapore	Catchweight (131 lb) bout; de Tomas missed weight.
Win	8–0	Tomohiro Adaniya	Decision (majority)	DEEP 78 Impact	March 18, 2017	2	5:00	Tokyo, Japan	
Win	7–0	Yuya Shibata	Submission (armbar)	DEEP Cage Impact 2016 in Osaka	October 9, 2016	2	2:51	Tokyo, Japan	
Win	6–0	Go Minamide	Decision (majority)	DEEP 77 Impact	August 27, 2016	2	5:00	Tokyo, Japan	
Win	5–0	Naoyuki Kato	Submission (rear-naked choke)	DEEP Nagoya Impact: Kobudo Fight 17	June 12, 2016	1	0:44	Tokyo, Japan	
Win	4–0	Iyori Akiba	Submission (rear-naked choke)	DEEP Cage Impact 2016	April 23, 2016	1	4:32	Tokyo, Japan	
Win	3–0	Chikara Shimabukuro	Decision (unanimous)	DEEP 74 Impact	December 20, 2015	2	5:00	Tokyo, Japan	
Win	2–0	Kenji Yamanaka	Submission (rear-naked choke)	DEEP 72 Impact	May 16, 2015	1	2:21	Tokyo, Japan	
Win	1–0	Kanta Sato	Submission (armbar)	DEEP Nagoya Impact: Kobudo Fight 16	March 8, 2015	1	2:49	Tokyo, Japan	Flyweight debut.

== Amateur mixed martial arts record ==
Res.	Record	Opponent	Method	Event	Date	Round	Time	Location	Notes
Win	2-0	Kenichi Kimura	Decision (Unanimous)	Deep - Amateur Deep 20: Kobudo Fight	March 2, 2014	3	5:00	Tokyo, Japan	
Win	1-0	Gaku Sakamoto	Submission (armbar)	Deep - Nagoya Impact 2014	February 9, 2014	1	3:04	Tokyo, Japan	.

== Amateur Kickboxing record ==
Amateur Kickboxing Record
Date	Result	Opponent	Event	Location	Method	Round	Time
2016-11-20	Win	(Japan) Ryota Shibasaki	J-Network All Japan A-League Tournament, Final	Tokyo, Japan	KO	1	0:46
Wins 2016 J-NETWORK All Japan A-League Lightweight title.
2016-11-20	Win	(Japan) Kaisei Kondo	J-Network All Japan A-League Tournament, Semi Final	Tokyo, Japan	Decision (Unanimous)		
2016-11-20	Win	(Japan) Hiroki Sato	J-Network All Japan A-League Tournament, Quarter Final	Tokyo, Japan	Decision (Unanimous)		
Legend: Win Loss Draw/No contest Notes

== See also ==
- List of current Rizin FF fighters
- List of male mixed martial artists
