= Kai Asakura =

Japanese mixed martial artist (born 1993)

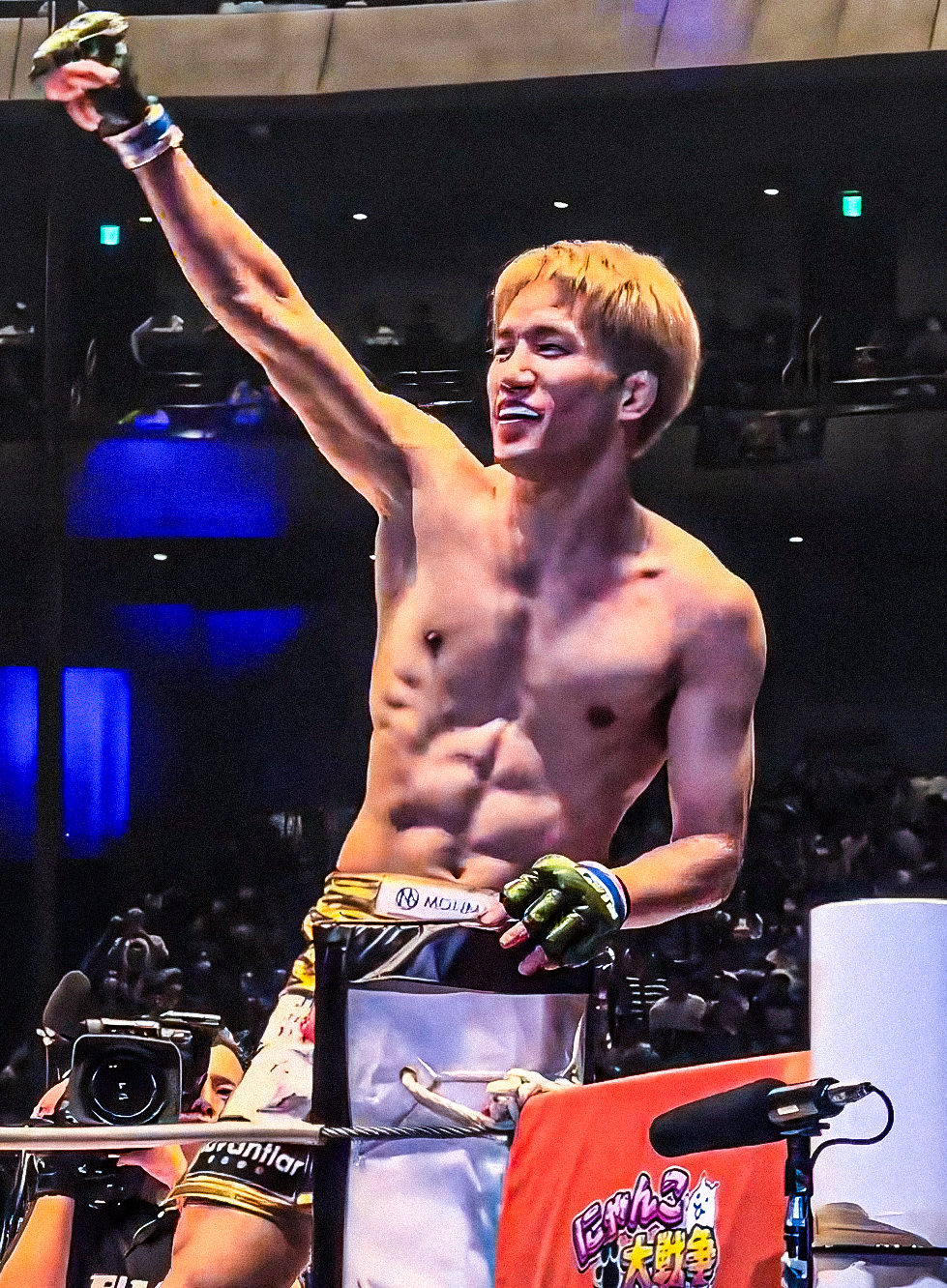
- Born: October 31, 1993 (age 33); Toyohashi, Aichi, Japan
- Native name: 朝倉海
- Other names: Bushido
- Height: 5 ft 8 in (1.73 m)
- Weight: 125 lb (57 kg; 8 st 13 lb)
- Division: Flyweight (2015–2017, 2024–2026); Bantamweight (2018–2023, 2026–Present); Catchweight (2012–2015)
- Reach: 69 in (175 cm)
- Fighting out of: Tokyo, Japan
- Team: JAPAN TOP TEAM
- Rank: Black belt in Zen Do Kai; Purple belt in Brazilian Jiu-Jitsu
- Years active: 2012–present

Mixed martial arts record
- Total: 29
- Wins: 23
- By knockout: 15
- By submission: 3
- By decision: 5
- Losses: 6
- By knockout: 3
- By submission: 2
- By decision: 1

Amateur record
- Total: 10
- Wins: 8
- By knockout: 5
- By submission: 1
- By decision: 2
- Losses: 2
- By decision: 2

Other information
- Notable relatives: Mikuru Asakura (brother)
- Mixed martial arts record from Sherdog

YouTube information
- Channel: KAI Channel / 朝倉海
- Subscribers: 1.4 million
- Views: 735.9 million
- Last updated: 17 January 2026

Kai Asakura (朝倉 海, Asakura Kai; born 31 October 1993) is a Japanese mixed martial artist currently competing in the Bantamweight division of the Ultimate Fighting Championship (UFC). He previously competed in Rizin Fighting Federation, where he was the Rizin Bantamweight Champion. A professional since 2012, he also competed for Road Fighting Championship, Fighting Network Rings and DEEP.

== Early life ==
In elementary school Kai trained karate and sumo, as well as spending three years training volleyball.

Kai and his brother, Mikuru Asakura, spent much of their childhood getting involved in numerous street fights. The brothers would often fight each other as well, to which Kai attributes his toughness as a professional mixed martial artist. As they were entering their adolescent years, at the suggestion of a therapist, their mother enrolled them into boxing classes.

Whilst a third year student at Aichi Prefectural Toyohashi Technical High School, his brother took him to the Zen Dokai Toyohashi Dojo, which was Kai’s first introduction to mixed martial arts. It was at the insistence and encouragement of his brother, Mikuru, that he took his interest in fighting.

== Mixed martial arts career ==
=== Early career ===
Asakura began his professional career under the banner of DEEP, when he faced a fellow debutante Tomoya Suzuki. Asakura won the bout via a first round TKO.

He would then fight with Fighting Network Rings new brand of MMA events named Outsider, after a three-year hiatus. He faced Satoshi Date, whom he defeated in the second round by TKO. Two months later he faced Keigo Takayama winning the fight after just 40 seconds via technical knockout. Two months later he fought a debuting Jung Bin Choi, earning his first career submission, forcing Choi to tap to a D'Arce choke in the first round. Asakura's next opponent was Jong Hyun Kwak. Asakura again ended the fight in the first round, winning through a TKO.

Fighting with Road Fighting Championship, Asakura fought Liu Xiaoyang, who he beat by an RNC in the first round. Fighting for the Fighting Network Rings 60 kg title, Asakura faced Yoichi Oi. He won the title fight in the first round, defeating Oi at the very end of the first round by technical knockout. Asakura's next opponent was Alateng Heili, who was riding a six-fight winning streak. Asakura won the fight after 29 seconds, hitting Heili with a short left hook, followed by a knee strike. Asakura suffered his first career loss to Je Hoon Moon during Road FC 39, losing via technical knockout.

=== Rizin Fighting Federation ===
Asakura made his Rizin debut on 29 December 2017, during RIZIN Fighting World Grand Prix 2017. Asakura was scheduled to fight the ZST Flyweight Champion Seiichiro Ito. Ito suffered a nasal fracture before the bout, and was replaced by Kizaemon Saiga. Kai won the fight in the second round after knocking Saiga out with a grounded knee.

During Rizin 10, Asakura faced bantamweight, Manel Kape. After suffering an early knockdown, he went on to win a split decision, which would be named as a Fight of the Month nominee for May 2018 by MMA Junkie.

Asakura was next scheduled to fight Thanongsaklek Tiger Muay Thai at Rizin 11. The fight was subsequently rescheduled for Rizin 13, after Asakura injured his right knee. At Rizin 13 and he won a unanimous decision.

During RIZIN Heisei's Last Yarennoka!, Asakura rematched with Je Hoon Moon. Asakura won via unanimous decision.

Asakura's face Ulka Sasaki. at Rizin 15. However, Sasaki had to pull out due to injury and was replaced by Justin Scoggins. Scoggins would then pull out of the bout after he suffered a meniscus and ligament tear in his knee.

His next fight was scheduled for Rizin 18 as a non-title bout against the Rizin bantamweight champion Kyoji Horiguchi. Asakura would feint Horiguchi backward and landed a big right hand as Horiguchi was blitzing in. Following up with knees and punches, Asakura won the fight via knockout.

Two months later he faced Ulka Sasaki at Rizin 19. Asakura dominated Sasaki, hitting the veteran with a right hand, and following up with grounded knees and soccer kicks and won the fight via technical knockout, as Sasaki was unable to continue due to a broken jaw.

==== Title reign ====
This six-fight winning streak gave Asakura a chance to fight for the Rizin bantamweight strap, in a rematch against Kyoji Horiguchi during Rizin 20. Horiguchi pulled out of the bout due to a knee injury and vacated the belt. Asakura faced Manel Kape in a rematch for the vacant Rizin Bantamweight Championship. Kape knocked Kai down twice in the beginning of the second round which forced the referee to stop the fight.

Asakura faced Hiromasa Ougikubo for the vacant Rizin Bantamweight Championship at Rizin 23. He won via first-round soccer kick knockout.

Asakura faced former Lightweight King of Pancrase Shoji Maruyama at Rizin 24 – Saitama. Asakura won the fight by a first round technical knockout.

Asakura was scheduled to make his first title defense in a rematch with the former Rizin Bantamweight champion Kyoji Horiguchi during Rizin 26 – Saitama. He lost the fight by a first-round TKO.

==== Rizin Bantamweight Grand Prix 2021 ====
Asakura faced Shooto Watanabe in the opening round of the Bantamweight Grand Prix at Rizin 28 on June 13, 2021. He won the fight by a first-round technical knockout.

Asakura faced Alan Yamaniha in the quarterfinals on September 19, 2021 at Rizin 30. He won the fight by unanimous decision.

In the semi-finals, Asakura faced Kenta Takizawa on December 31, 2021 at Rizin 33. He won the fight by unanimous decision, and advanced to the tournament finals, where he faced Hiromasa Ougikubo. He lost the bout via unanimous decision, becoming the runner up in the Grand Prix.

==== Continued bantamweight career ====
Asakura was expected to face the undefeated Ji Yong Yang at Rizin 36 on July 2, 2022. Asakura withdrew from the fight on June 30, as he had re-injured his right hand.

Asakura faced Yuki Motoya at Rizin 42 on May 6, 2023. He won the fight by a second-round flying knee knockout.

Asakura was expected to face former Bellator Bantamweight Champion Juan Archuleta for the vacant Rizin Bantamweight Championship at Bellator MMA x Rizin 2 on July 30, 2023. However on July 18 it was announced that Asakura withdrew due to injury and was replaced by Hiromasa Ougikubo.

==== Second title reign ====
Asakura faced Juan Archuleta for the Rizin Bantamweight Championship on December 31, 2023, at Rizin 45. At the weigh-ins, Archuleta weighed in at 140.65 pounds, 5.65 pounds over the limit. As a result, Archuleta was stripped of the title and only Asakura was eligible to win it. Asakura won the bout via technical knockout in the second round.

=== Ultimate Fighting Championship ===
On June 8, 2024, it was announced that Asakura signed with the Ultimate Fighting Championship.

In his promotional debut, Asakura competed for the UFC Flyweight Championship against champion Alexandre Pantoja on December 7, 2024 at UFC 310. Asakura lost the fight via a rear-naked choke submission in the second round.

Asakura faced former UFC Flyweight title challenger Tim Elliott on August 16, 2025 at UFC 319. He lost the fight via a guillotine choke in round two.

Returning to bantamweight, Asakura faced Cameron Smotherman on May 30, 2026 at UFC Fight Night 277. He won the fight by knockout in the first round. This fight earned him a $100,000 Performance of the Night award.

Asakura faced Aori Qileng on August 29, 2026 at UFC Fight Night 286. He won the fight by technical knockout in the second round.

== Championships and accomplishments ==
=== Mixed martial arts ===
- Ultimate Fighting Championship
  - Performance of the Night (One time) vs. Cameron Smotherman
- Rizin Fighting Federation
  - Rizin Bantamweight Championship (Two times; former)
  - Rizin Bantamweight Grand Prix 2021 Runner-up
- MMA Sucka
  - 2019 Non-UFC Breakout Star of the Year
  - 2019 Upset of the Year vs. Kyoji Horiguchi
- eFight.jp
  - August 2019 Fighter of the Month

== Personal life ==
He is the younger brother of Mikuru Asakura.

== Mixed martial arts record ==
Professional record breakdown
29 matches	23 wins	6 losses
By knockout	15	3
By submission	3	2
By decision	5	1

Res.	Record	Opponent	Method	Event	Date	Round	Time	Location	Notes
Win	23–6	Aori Qileng	TKO (head kick and punches)	UFC Fight Night: Nurmagomedov vs. Song	August 29, 2026	2	0:34	Shanghai, China	
Win	22–6	Cameron Smotherman	KO (punch)	UFC Fight Night: Song vs. Figueiredo	May 30, 2026	1	1:50	Macau SAR, China	Return to Bantamweight. Performance of the Night.
Loss	21–6	Tim Elliott	Submission (guillotine choke)	UFC 319	August 16, 2025	2	4:39	Chicago, Illinois, United States	
Loss	21–5	Alexandre Pantoja	Technical Submission (rear-naked choke)	UFC 310	December 7, 2024	2	2:05	Las Vegas, Nevada, United States	Return to Flyweight. For the UFC Flyweight Championship.
Win	21–4	Juan Archuleta	TKO (knee to the body and punches)	Rizin 45	December 31, 2023	2	3:20	Saitama, Japan	Won the vacant Rizin Bantamweight Championship. Archuleta missed weight (140.65 lb) and was stripped of the title. Only Asakura was eligible. Later vacated the title on 9 June 2024.
Win	20–4	Yuki Motoya	KO (knee to the body)	Rizin 42	May 6, 2023	3	2:25	Tokyo, Japan	
Loss	19–4	Hiromasa Ougikubo	Decision (unanimous)	Rizin 33	December 31, 2021	3	5:00	Saitama, Japan	2021 Rizin Bantamweight Grand Prix Final.
Win	19–3	Kenta Takizawa	Decision (unanimous)	Rizin 33	December 31, 2021	3	5:00	Saitama, Japan	2021 Rizin Bantamweight Grand Prix Semifinal.
Win	18–3	Alan Yamaniha	Decision (unanimous)	Rizin 30	September 19, 2021	3	5:00	Saitama, Japan	2021 Rizin Bantamweight Grand Prix Quarterfinal.
Win	17–3	Shooto Watanabe	TKO (punches)	Rizin 28	June 13, 2021	1	3:22	Tokyo, Japan	2021 Rizin Bantamweight Grand Prix Opening round.
Loss	16–3	Kyoji Horiguchi	KO (punches)	Rizin 26	December 31, 2020	1	2:48	Saitama, Japan	Lost the Rizin Bantamweight Championship.
Win	16–2	Shoji Maruyama	TKO (punches and soccer kick)	Rizin 24	September 27, 2020	1	2:37	Saitama, Japan	Non-title bout.
Win	15–2	Hiromasa Ougikubo	KO (knee and soccer kicks)	Rizin 23	August 10, 2020	1	4:31	Yokohama, Japan	Won the vacant Rizin Bantamweight Championship.
Loss	14–2	Manel Kape	TKO (punches)	Rizin 20	December 31, 2019	2	0:38	Saitama, Japan	For the vacant Rizin Bantamweight Championship.
Win	14–1	Ulka Sasaki	TKO (broken jaw)	Rizin 19	October 12, 2019	1	0:54	Osaka, Japan	
Win	13–1	Kyoji Horiguchi	KO (punches)	Rizin 18	August 18, 2019	1	1:08	Nagoya, Japan	
Win	12–1	Moon Jae-hoon	Decision (unanimous)	Rizin: Heisei's Last Yarennoka!	December 30, 2018	3	5:00	Saitama, Japan	Bantamweight debut.
Win	11–1	Topnoi Kiwram	Decision (unanimous)	Rizin 13	September 30, 2018	3	5:00	Saitama, Japan	Catchweight (130 lb) bout.
Win	10–1	Manel Kape	Decision (split)	Rizin 10	May 6, 2018	3	5:00	Fukuoka, Japan	Catchweight (130 lb) bout.
Win	9–1	Kizaemon Saiga	TKO (punches and knee)	Rizin World Grand Prix 2017: 2nd Round	December 29, 2017	2	2:34	Saitama, Japan	Catchweight (139 lb) bout.
Loss	8–1	Moon Jae-hoon	KO (punches)	Road FC 39	June 10, 2017	3	2:38	Seoul, South Korea	
Win	8–0	Alateng Heili	KO (knee and punches)	Road FC 37	March 11, 2017	1	0:29	Seoul, South Korea	Return to Flyweight.
Win	7–0	Yoichi Oi	TKO (punches)	Rings: The Outsider 42	September 4, 2016	1	4:52	Aichi, Japan	Won the Rings 60kg Championship.
Win	6–0	Liu Xiaoyang	Submission (rear-naked choke)	Road FC 32	July 2, 2016	1	1:49	Changsha, China	
Win	5–0	Kwak Jong-hyun	TKO (punches)	Rings: The Outsider 38	December 13, 2015	1	4:04	Tokyo, Japan	Flyweight debut.
Win	4–0	Choi Jung-bin	Submission (brabo choke)	Rings: The Outsider 37	September 6, 2015	1	2:21	Numazu, Japan	Catchweight (128 lb) bout.
Win	3–0	Keigo Takayama	TKO (punches)	Rings: The Outsider 36	July 19, 2015	1	0:40	Tokyo, Japan	
Win	2–0	Satoru Date	TKO (punches)	Rings: The Outsider 35	May 17, 2015	2	3:36	Tokyo, Japan	Moved to Rings' 60 kg division.
Win	1–0	Tomoya Suzuki	Technical Submission (armbar)	DEEP: Cage Impact 2012 in Hamamatsu	September 16, 2012	1	2:34	Hamamatsu, Japan	Catchweight (128 lb) bout.

== Amateur mixed martial arts record ==
Amateur record breakdown		
10 matches	8 wins	2 losses
By knockout	5	0
By submission	1	0
By decision	2	2

Res.	Record	Opponent	Method	Event	Date	Round	Time	Location	Notes
Win	8–2	Yoichi Oi	TKO (punches)	Rings: The Outsider 33	December 7, 2014	1	N/A	Yokohama, Kanagawa, Japan	Won the Outsider Bantamweight Tournament Championship.
Win	7–2	Masamichi Yoshino	TKO (punches)	Rings: The Outsider 33	December 7, 2014	1	0:22	Yokohama, Kanagawa, Japan	Outsider Bantamweight Tournament Semi-finals.
Win	6–2	Takayuki Okugi	TKO (punches)	Rings: The Outsider 32	September 7, 2014	1	0:23	Kadoma, Osaka, Japan	
Win	5–2	Masaya Kamide	Decision (unanimous)	Rings: The Outsider 31	June 22, 2014	2	3:00	Tokyo, Japan	
Win	4–2	Kenta Tanoue	TKO (punches)	Rings: The Outsider 30	April 6, 2014	1	1:07	Tokyo, Japan	
Win	3–2	Shota Kaneko	TKO (punches)	Rings: The Outsider 29	February 16, 2014	1	1:09	Tokyo, Japan	
Win	2–2	Masamune Shimada	Decision (unanimous)	Rings: The Outsider 28	December 7, 2013	2	3:00	Kadoma, Osaka, Japan	
Loss	1–2	Ryota Kitamura	Decision (unanimous)	Rings: The Outsider 27	September 9, 2013	2	3:00	Osaka, Japan	
Loss	1–1	Riku Shibuya	Decision (unanimous)	Rings: The Outsider 25	April 21, 2013	2	3:00	Tokyo, Japan	
Win	1–0	Dai Aoki	Technical Submission (armbar)	Rings: The Outsider 24	February 10, 2013	1	0:31	Tokyo, Japan	

== Pay-per-view bouts ==
No	Event	Fight	Date	Venue	City	PPV buys
1.	UFC 310	Pantoja vs. Asakura	December 7, 2024	T-Mobile Arena	Las Vegas, Nevada, United States	Not Disclosed

== Bibliography ==
- 『革命のアウトサイダー』Kakumei no autosaidā（KADOKAWA、2021）

== See also ==
- List of current UFC fighters
- List of male mixed martial artists
