= Shooto Watanabe =

Japanese mixed martial artist

- Born: 渡部修斗; February 27, 1989 (age 37); Tochigi, Japan
- Nationality: Japanese
- Height: 5 ft 8 in (1.73 m)
- Weight: 135 lb (61 kg; 9 st 9 lb)
- Division: Bantamweight
- Style: Judo, Wrestling
- Fighting out of: Kawasaki, Kanagawa, Japan
- Team: Strapple Shinyurigaoka
- Years active: 2012–present

Mixed martial arts record
- Total: 43
- Wins: 29
- By knockout: 3
- By submission: 17
- By decision: 8
- By disqualification: 1
- Losses: 9
- By knockout: 4
- By submission: 3
- By decision: 2
- Draws: 5

Other information
- Notable relatives: Yuichi Watanabe, father
- Mixed martial arts record from Sherdog

Shooto Watanabe is a Japanese male mixed martial artist who competed in the Bantamweight division.

== Background ==
As the name "Shooto" implies, he is the son of Yuichi Watanabe, the first welterweight champion of Shooto, as his father . He studied judo from the 5th grade of elementary school, belonged to the wrestling club in parallel from junior high school, and entered high school at Ashikaga Institute of Technology, a prestigious school for wrestling. He entered college and stayed away from wrestling for a while, but was impressed by Masato's retirement match and decided to follow the same martial arts path as his father.

== Career ==
=== Debut ===
He made his debut at Pancrase Progress Tour 4, earning a draw against Yoshifumi Ishiki.

=== ZST ===
3 months following his pro debut, he entered ZST's Bantamweight tournament, earning his first victory against Tadayuki Nakamura with what would become his patented rear-naked choke at ZST: Battle Hazard 6. He followed this up by scoring a unanimous decision victory in the semifinals against Nobuyuki Kanaizuka at ZST: SWAT! 47 He met future ZST Flyweight Champion, Seiichiro Ito in the finals, scoring an emphatic submission in just 62 seconds to capture the bantamweight tournament championship at ZST: SWAT! in Face 11 Despite winning a tournament only 5 months into his career, he would face a dip in form, going 2-1-3 in his next 6 fights, with his sole victory coming against Shintaro Kubo at VTJ 2nd in June 2013. He started 2014 off with a stoppage loss to future foe Go Kashiwazaki, but strung together a 7-fight unbeaten streak lasting 2 and a half years, earning a rematch with Kashiwazaki - this time for the ZST Bantamweight Championship. His fate would be nearly identical, losing via stoppage in the 2nd round. This would prove to be his final appearance with ZST, finishing with a 8-3-4 record in the promotion (9-3-5, 1NC overall).

=== Fighting NEXUS & GLADIATOR ===
Watanabe would make his Fighting NEXUS debut 3 months following his failed title challenge for the ZST title, kicking off his NEXUS career nearly identical to his ZST debut, a rear-naked choke victory in just 85 seconds. 4 months later he competed under the GLADIATOR banner, scoring a second successive rear-naked choke victory against Yutaka Imamura; a victory which would catapult him to his second title challenge in 12 months. However, he first competed at Fighting NEXUS 9, finishing Jun Ikkyu with a guillotine choke in just 24 seconds. This allowed for a quick turnaround, to face Naritoshi Kakuta for the GLADIATOR Bantamweight Championship. However, once again, Watanabe would come up short, dropping a unanimous decision. He closed out 2017 with a unanimous decision victory of his own, over Kotaro Kazama. This win would spur on a 9-fight unbeaten streak, in which he would capture the vacant Fighting NEXUS Bantamweight Championship in December 2018, and score 2 victories under the DEEP promotion.

=== RIZIN Fighting Federation ===
With an impressive unbeaten streak stretching back 2 and a half years, Japan's premier MMA promotion, Rizin Fighting Federation announced that Watanabe would be facing rising prospect and UFC veteran, Naoki Inoue on August 9, 2020 at Rizin 22. Watanabe was defeated at 1:40 of the first round via rear-naked choke.

On February 16, it was announced that Watanabe would face Takumi Tamaru at Rizin 27 to earn a spot in RIZIN's upcoming Japan Bantamweight Grand Prix, with the winner of the grand prix being expected to face RIZIN Bantamweight Champion, Kyoji Horiguchi in 2022. Watanabe defeated Tamaru by rear-naked choke in the 2nd round.

4 days later, RIZIN held a press conference where the drawing for the Grand Prix would occur. Former RIZIN Bantamweight Champion Kai Asakura chose the slot to face Watanabe. They faced each other at Rizin 28 on June 13, 2021 at the Tokyo Dome. Shooto lost the fight by a first-round technical knockout.

Watanabe was scheduled to face Kuya Ito on October 10, 2021 at Rizin Landmark Vol.1. Ito later withdrew from his bout with Watanabe due to COVID-19 protocols, and was replaced by Nobutaka Naito. He won the bout after choking Naito unconscious via brabo choke in the first round.

Watanabe was booked to face Takuma Sudo on April 16, 2022 at Rizin Trigger 3. He lost the fight by split decision.

=== DEEP ===
Watanabe faced Takuma Uchiyama at Deep 108 Impact on July 10, 2022. He won the bout by unanimous decision.

Watanabe faced Rikiya Matsuzawa on February 11, 2023 at DEEP 112, losing the bout via TKO stoppage 27 seconds into the bout.

== Personal life ==
Watanabe is the son of MMA pioneer and Shooto's inaugural Lightweight Champion, Yuichi Watanabe. His mother also competed in Shooto.

== Championships and accomplishments ==
- Fighting NEXUS
  - Fighting Nexus Bantamweight Championship (One time)
    - One successful title defense
- Pound For Pound Fighting Championship
  - PFPFC Bantamweight Championship (One time)

== Mixed martial arts record ==
Professional record breakdown
| 44 matches | 29 wins | 9 losses |
| By knockout | 3 | 4 |
| By submission | 17 | 3 |
| By decision | 8 | 2 |
| By disqualification | 1 | 0 |
| Draws | 5 | |
| No contests | 1 | |

| Res. | Record | Opponent | Method | Event | Date | Round | Time | Location | Notes |
|---|---|---|---|---|---|---|---|---|---|
| Win | 29–9–5 (1) | Hiroki Sugimoto | TKO (punches) | Roots of Martial Arts Network 5 | July 12, 2026 | 1 | 3:20 | Tokyo, Japan | Full Gi bout. |
| Win | 28–9–5 (1) | Keisuke Hashimoto | Submission (bow and arrow choke) | Roots of Martial Arts Network 4 | March 15, 2026 | 1 | 2:28 | Tokyo, Japan | Return to Bantamweight. Full Gi bout. |
| Loss | 27–9–5 (1) | Kenta Hayashi | Technical Submission (ninja choke) | Deep 121 Impact | September 16, 2024 | 1 | 3:11 | Tokyo, Japan | Flyweight debut. |
| Win | 27–8–5 (1) | Hiroto Kamematsu | Technical Submission (rear-naked choke) | Pound For Pound FC 32 | March 3, 2024 | 3 | 5:00 | Tokyo, Japan | Defended the P4PFC Bantamweight Championship. |
| Win | 26–8–5 (1) | Takuya Ogura | Decision (majority) | Fighting NEXUS vol.32 | August 20, 2023 | 3 | 5:00 | Tokyo, Japan | Won the P4PFC Bantamweight Championship. |
| Win | 25–8–5 (1) | Kazuki Aoki | Submission (rear-naked choke) | Fighting NEXUS vol.31 | May 21, 2023 | 1 | 2:18 | Tokyo, Japan | |
| Loss | 24–8–5 (1) | Rikiya Matsuzawa | TKO (punches) | DEEP 112 Impact | February 11, 2023 | 1 | 0:27 | Tokyo, Japan | |
| Win | 24–7–5 (1) | Takuma Uchiyama | Decision (unanimous) | DEEP 108 Impact | July 10, 2022 | 3 | 5:00 | Tokyo, Japan | |
| Loss | 23–7–5 (1) | Takuma Sudo | Decision (split) | Rizin Trigger 3 | Apr 16, 2022 | 3 | 5:00 | Chōfu, Japan | |
| Win | 23–6–5 (1) | Nobutaka Naito | Technical Submission (brabo choke) | Rizin Landmark 1 | October 2, 2021 | 1 | 1:33 | Tokyo, Japan | |
| Loss | 22–6–5 (1) | Kai Asakura | TKO (punches) | Rizin 28 | June 13, 2021 | 1 | 3:22 | Tokyo, Japan | 2021 Rizin Bantamweight Grand Prix Opening Round. |
| Win | 22–5–5 (1) | Takumi Tamaru | Submission (rear-naked choke) | Rizin 27 | March 21, 2021 | 2 | 4:13 | Nagoya, Japan | Return to Bantamweight. |
| Win | 21–5–6 (1) | Takashi Terada | Submission (rear-naked choke) | Fighting NEXUS vol.21 | December 27, 2020 | 1 | 1:37 | Tokyo, Japan | Featherweight debut. |
| Loss | 20–5–5 (1) | Naoki Inoue | Submission (rear-naked choke) | Rizin 22 | August 9, 2020 | 1 | 1:40 | Yokohama, Japan | |
| Win | 20–4–5 (1) | Hiroto Sakuma | Submission (rear-naked choke) | Fighting NEXUS vol.18 | November 24, 2019 | 1 | 3:48 | Tokyo, Japan | Defended the Fighting Nexus Bantamweight Championship. |
| Win | 19–4–5 (1) | Yoichiro Kuranobu | Decision (unanimous) | DEEP 91 Impact | September 8, 2019 | 2 | 5:00 | Tokyo, Japan | |
| Win | 18–4–5 (1) | Hiroyuki Kobayashi | Technical Submission (rear-naked choke) | DEEP 90 Impact | June 29, 2019 | 1 | 1:22 | Tokyo, Japan | |
| Win | 17–4–5 (1) | Kodai Murata | Decision (unanimous) | Fighting NEXUS vol.15 | December 16, 2018 | 2 | 5:00 | Tokyo, Japan | Won the Fighting Nexus Bantamweight Tournament and the vacant Fighting Nexus Bantamweight Championship. |
| Win | 16–4–5 (1) | Takeya Takemoto | DQ (illegal upkick) | Fighting NEXUS vol.15 | December 16, 2018 | 1 | 1:54 | Tokyo, Japan | Fighting Nexus Bantamweight Tournament Semifinal. |
| Win | 15–4–5 (1) | Masato Arai | Technical Submission (rear-naked choke) | Fighting NEXUS 14 | August 11, 2018 | 1 | 1:23 | Tokyo, Japan | |
| Win | 14–4–5 (1) | Teppei Suwabe | Decision (unanimous) | Fighting NEXUS vol.13 | May 6, 2018 | 2 | 5:00 | Tokyo, Japan | |
| Draw | 13–4–5 (1) | Takeya Takemoto | Draw (split) | Gladiator 005 | January 21, 2018 | 2 | 5:00 | Osaka, Japan | |
| Win | 13–4–5 (1) | Kotaro Kazama | Decision (unanimous) | Fighting NEXUS vol.11 | December 3, 2017 | 2 | 5:00 | Tokyo, Japan | |
| Loss | 12–4–4 (1) | Naritoshi Kakuta | Decision (unanimous) | Gladiator 004 | August 13, 2017 | 3 | 5:00 | Wakayama, Japan | For the inaugural Gladiator Bantamweight Championship. |
| Win | 12–3–4 (1) | Hitoya Sumisojun | Submission (guillotine choke) | Fighting NEXUS vol.9 | May 21, 2017 | 1 | 0:24 | Tokyo, Japan | |
| Win | 11–3–4 (1) | Yutaka Imamura | Submission (face crank) | Gladiator 003 | March 5, 2017 | 1 | 2:09 | Wakayama, Japan | |
| Win | 10–3–4 (1) | Yoshiyuki Sakurazawa | Submission (rear-naked choke) | Fighting NEXUS vol.8 | November 12, 2016 | 1 | 1:25 | Tokyo, Japan | |
| Loss | 9–3–4 (1) | Go Kashiwazaki | TKO (punches) | ZST 53 | August 7, 2016 | 2 | 4:59 | Tokyo, Japan | For the ZST Bantamweight Championship. |
| Win | 9–2–4 (1) | Yasuhiro Wakabayashi | TKO (punches) | ZST 50 | April 17, 2016 | 1 | 3:42 | Tokyo, Japan | |
| NC | 8–2–4 (1) | Zheng Junfeng | NC (overturned) | WLF E.P.I.C. 2 | March 12, 2016 | 2 | 3:00 | Zhengzhou, China | Originally a TKO win for Zheng; later overturned into a no contest. |
| Win | 8–2–4 | Kohei Kuraoka | Submission (rear-naked choke) | ZST 49 | November 22, 2015 | 1 | 1:43 | Tokyo, Japan | |
| Draw | 7–2–4 | Atsushi Kato | Draw (split) | ZST 46 | May 24, 2015 | 3 | 5:00 | Tokyo, Japan | |
| Win | 7–2–3 | Shintaro Kubo | Submission (rear-naked choke) | ZST 44 | February 22, 2015 | 1 | 3:00 | Tokyo, Japan | |
| Win | 6–2–3 | Seio Date | TKO (punches) | ZST 42 | August 31, 2014 | 1 | 2:47 | Tokyo, Japan | |
| Win | 5–2–3 | Ryutaro Watanabe | Submission (rear-naked choke) | ZST in Yokosuka Vol. 1 | June 29, 2014 | 1 | 1:19 | Yokohama, Japan | |
| Loss | 4–2–3 | Go Kashiwazaki | TKO (knee) | ZST 39 | February 9, 2014 | 2 | 3:57 | Tokyo, Japan | |
| Draw | 4–1–3 | Kengo Okubo | Draw (time limit) | ZST 37 | September 23, 2013 | 2 | 5:00 | Tokyo, Japan | |
| Win | 4–1–2 | Shintaro Kubo | Decision (unanimous) | Vale Tudo Japan 2nd | June 22, 2013 | 3 | 3:00 | Tokyo, Japan | |
| Draw | 3–1–2 | Takao Ueda | Draw (time limit) | ZST 35 | April 7, 2013 | 2 | 5:00 | Tokyo, Japan | |
| Loss | 3–1–1 | Toshihiro Shimizu | Submission (triangle choke) | ZST 34 | February 11, 2013 | 1 | 3:29 | Tokyo, Japan | |
| Draw | 3–0–1 | Tetsuya Fusano | Draw (time limit) | ZST 33 | November 23, 2012 | 2 | 5:00 | Tokyo, Japan | |
| Win | 3–0 | Seiichiro Ito | Submission (rear-naked choke) | ZST: SWAT! in Face 11 | September 17, 2012 | 1 | 1:02 | Tokyo, Japan | Won the 2012 ZST SWAT! Bantamweight Tournament. |
| Win | 2–0 | Nobuyuki Kanaizuka | Decision (unanimous) | ZST: SWAT! 47 | August 12, 2012 | 2 | 5:00 | Chōfu, Japan | 2012 ZST SWAT! Bantamweight Tournament Semifinal. |
| Win | 1–0 | Tadayuki Nakamura | Submission (rear-naked choke) | ZST: Battle Hazard 6 | July 16, 2012 | 1 | 1:54 | Tokyo, Japan | Bantamweight debut. 2012 ZST SWAT! Bantamweight Tournament Quarterfinal. |

== See also ==
- List of current Rizin FF fighters
- List of male mixed martial artists
