= 2021 in Rizin Fighting Federation =

Information
- First date: March 21, 2021
- Last date: December 31, 2021

Events
- Total events: 9

Fights
- Total fights: 112
- Title fights: 4

Chronology
2020 in Rizin Fighting Federation	2021 in Rizin Fighting Federation	2022 in Rizin Fighting Federation

The year 2021 was the seventh year in the history of the Rizin Fighting Federation, a mixed martial arts promotion based in Japan. Rizin events are broadcast through a television agreement with Fuji Television. In North America and Europe, Rizin events are available via PPV on LIVENow.

== Background ==
Nobuyuki Sakakibara announced that Rizin is planning to work in copromotion with new Japanese promotion MEGA.

He also announced that they will work with Scott Coker to bring the Bellator Bantamweight World Champion Juan Archuleta in Japan to face the winner of the Rizin Bantamweight Championship bout between Kai Asakura and Kyoji Horiguchi.

== List of events ==
Rizin Fighting Federation
#	Event	Date	Venue	Location	Attendance
1	Rizin 27 – Nagoya	March 21, 2021	Nippon Gaishi Hall	Nagoya, Japan	4,558
2	Rizin 28 – Tokyo	June 13, 2021	Tokyo Dome	Tokyo, Japan	9,317
3	Rizin 29 – Osaka	June 27, 2021	Maruzen Intec Arena	Osaka, Japan	4,796
4	Rizin 30 - Saitama	September 19, 2021	Saitama Super Arena	Saitama, Japan	7,580
5	Rizin Landmark Vol.1	October 10, 2021		Tokyo, Japan	
6	Rizin 31 - Yokohama	October 24, 2021	Pia Arena	Yokohama, Japan	4,866
7	Rizin 32 - Okinawa	November 20, 2021	Okinawa Arena	Okinawa, Japan	
8	Rizin Trigger 1	November 28, 2021	World Memorial Hall	Kobe, Japan	
9	Rizin 33 - Saitama	December 31, 2021	Saitama Super Arena	Saitama, Japan	22, 499

== Grand Prix ==
On March 26, 2021, it was announced that a Bantamweight Grand Prix will be held during the year: beginning in Rizin 28 – Tokyo and ending in the Rizin New Year's Eve event. The winner will receive ¥10,000,000 and the second place will net ¥5,000,000.

=== Rizin Bantamweight Grand Prix 2021 bracket ===
Opening Round; Rizin 28 & 29
(Japan) Hiroki Yamashita	3R.
(Japan) Takafumi Otsuka	UD
(Japan) Takeshi Kasugai	3R.
(Japan) Hiromasa Ougikubo	UD
(Japan) Yuto Hokamura	UD
(Japan) Kuya Ito	3R.
(Japan) Naoki Inoue	KO
(Japan) Shintaro Ishiwatari	1R.
(Japan) Shooto Watanabe	1R.
(Japan) Kai Asakura	TKO
(Japan) Kazuma Kuramoto	3R.
(Brazil) Alan Yamaniha	UD
(Japan) Yuki Motoya	UD
(Japan) Ryo Okada	3R.
(Japan) Kenta Takizawa	UD
(Japan) Masakazu Imanari	3R.

Quarterfinals; Rizin 30
(Japan) Takafumi Otsuka	3R.
(Japan) Hiromasa Ougikubo	UD
(Japan) Yuto Hokamura	3R.
(Japan) Naoki Inoue	UD
(Japan) Kai Asakura	UD
(Brazil) Alan Yamaniha	3R.
(Japan) Yuki Motoya	1R.
(Japan) Kenta Takizawa	TKO

Semifinals; Rizin 33 - Saitama
(Japan) Kai Asakura	UD
(Japan) Kenta Takizawa	3R.
(Japan) Hiromasa Ougikubo	UD
(Japan) Naoki Inoue	3R.

Final; Rizin 33 - Saitama
(Japan) Kai Asakura	3R.
(Japan) Hiromasa Ougikubo	UD

== Rizin 27 – Nagoya ==
Rizin 27 – Nagoya
- Promotion: Rizin Fighting Federation
- Date: March 21, 2021
- Venue: Nippon Gaishi Hall
- City: Nagoya, Japan
- Attendance: 4,558

Event chronology
Rizin 26	Rizin 27 – Nagoya

Rizin 27 – Nagoya was initially scheduled to be a combat sport event held by Rizin Fighting Federation on March 14, 2021, at the Tokyo Dome in Tokyo, Japan. However, in February it was announced that the event was postponed to take place at Nippon Gaishi Hall in Nagoya, Japan, on March 21, 2021.

=== Background ===
A Rizin Women's Super Atomweight Championship rematch bout between current two-time champion Ayaka Hamasaki and Kanna Asakura is expected to headline this event. The pairing met previously at Rizin 14 on December 31, 2018, where Hamasaki won via armbar in the second round to capture the inaugural Rizin Women's Super Atomweight title.

The co-main event featured a lightweight bout between the brazilian grappler Roberto de Souza and the former lightweight King of Pancrase Kazuki Tokudome.

Riki Sakurai missed weight limit ahead of his fight against Riku Yoshida, Sakurai was 1.95 kilograms over the limit. The fight will proceed, Sakurai started the fight with minus 2 points and the bout was declared no contest because he win.

Tsuyoshi Sudario was fined after he landed punches after the referee stops the fight, he has been fined 25 percent of his purse.

=== Results ===
Rizin 27
Weight Class				Method	Round	T.Time	Notes
W.Super Atomweight 49 kg	(Japan) Ayaka Hamasaki (c)	def.	(Japan) Kanna Asakura	Decision (Split)	3	5:00	For the Rizin Women's Super Atomweight Championship
Lightweight 71 kg	(Brazil) Roberto de Souza	def.	(Japan) Kazuki Tokudome	Submission (Triangle Choke)	1	1:44	
Lightweight 71 kg	(Japan) Koji Takeda	def.	(Japan) Takasuke Kume	Decision (Unanimous)	3	15:00	
Featherweight 66 kg	(Japan) Kleber Koike Erbst	def.	(Japan) Kazumasa Majima	Submission (Triangle Choke)	2	8:02	
Heavyweight 120 kg	(Japan) Tsuyoshi Sudario	def.	(Japan) Kazushi Miyamoto	KO (Punches)	1	0:08	
Intermission
Catchweight 61 kg	(Japan) Taiga	def.	(Japan) Kanta Motoyama	Decision (Unanimous)	3	9:00	Kickboxing
Featherweight 66 kg	(Japan) Yoshinori Horie	def.	(Japan) Tetsuya Seki	TKO (Punches)	3	11:16	
Bantamweight 61 kg	(Japan) Hiroki Yamashita	def.	(Japan) Kazuma Sone	KO (Punches)	1	0:27	
Bantamweight 61 kg	(Japan) Shooto Watanabe	def.	(Japan) Takumi Tamaru	Submission (Rear-Naked Choke)	2	9:13	
Flyweight 57 kg	(Japan) Yutaro Muramoto	def.	(Japan) Seigo Yamamoto	KO (Punches)	1	2:37	
Catchweight 53 kg	(Japan) Syuto Sato	-	(Japan) Masayoshi Kunimoto	Draw (Majority)	3	9:00	Kickboxing
Catchweight 66 kg	(Japan) Riki Sakurai	-	(Japan) Riku Yoshida	No Contest (Sakurai missed weight)	1	0:43	Kickboxing
Catchweight 55 kg	(Japan) Ryota Naito	def.	(Japan) Hiroki	Decision (Unanimous)	3	9:00	Kickboxing
Flyweight 57 kg	(Japan) Yuki Ito	def.	(Japan) Kohei Sugiyama	TKO (Punches)	1	0:33	

== Rizin 28 – Tokyo ==
Rizin 28 – Tokyo
- Promotion: Rizin Fighting Federation
- Date: June 13, 2021
- Venue: Tokyo Dome
- City: Tokyo, Japan
- Attendance: 9,317

Rizin 28 – Tokyo was a Combat sport event held by Rizin Fighting Federation on June 13, 2021, at the Tokyo Dome in Tokyo, Japan.

=== Background ===
The event featured the one time RIZIN Featherweight title challenger Mikuru Asakura who made his tenth RIZIN appearance against the former KSW Featherweight Champion Kleber Koike Erbst as the event headliner.

Roberto de Souza and Tofiq Musayev battled for the inaugural Rizin Fighting Federation Lightweight Championship.

This event also hosted the first half of Rizin Bantamweight Grand Prix Opening round fights. The event was originally scheduled to take place on May 23, however due to a State of Emergency being declared between April 25 to May 9, the event was postponed to June 13. Due to the ticketing system, the event numbers will stay as they are. This will be the first MMA event in the Tokyo Dome in 18 years and they are hoping to hold at least 50% capacity for the venue, equaling about 25,000 spectators.

RIZIN Featherweight champion Yutaka Saito fought Vugar Keramov in a non-title bout.

A heavyweight bout between Tsuyoshi Sudario and Shoma Shibisai was announced for the event.

RISE Welterweight champion BeyNoah made his mixed martial arts debut against Satoshi Yamasu in a 73 kg catchweight bout.

=== Results ===
Rizin 28
Weight Class				Method	Round	T.Time	Notes
Featherweight 66 kg	(Brazil) Kleber Koike Erbst	def.	(Japan) Mikuru Asakura	Technical Submission (Triangle Choke)	2	1:51	
	(Japan) Tenshin Nasukawa	-	(Japan) Koki Osaki	Time Expired	3	3:00	Special Standing Bout
	(Japan) Tenshin Nasukawa	-	(Japan) Hiroya Kawabe	Time Expired	3	3:00	Special Standing Bout
	(Japan) Tenshin Nasukawa	-	(Japan) Hideo Tokoro	Time Expired	3	3:00	Special Standing Bout
Intermission
Lightweight 70 kg	(Brazil) Roberto de Souza	def.	(Azerbaijan) Tofiq Musayev	Submission (Triangle Choke)	1	1:12	For the inaugural Rizin Lightweight Championship.
Bantamweight 61 kg	(Japan) Kai Asakura	def.	(Japan) Shooto Watanabe	TKO (Punches)	1	3:22	Rizin Bantamweight Grand Prix 2021 Opening Round
Bantamweight 61 kg	(Japan) Naoki Inoue	def.	(Japan) Shintaro Ishiwatari	KO (Soccer Kick)	1	1:58	Rizin Bantamweight Grand Prix 2021 Opening Round
Bantamweight 61 kg	(Japan) Hiromasa Ougikubo	def.	(Japan) Takeshi Kasugai	Decision (Unanimous)	3	5:00	Rizin Bantamweight Grand Prix 2021 Opening Round
Bantamweight 61 kg	(Japan) Yuki Motoya	def.	(Japan) Ryo Okada	Decision (Unanimous)	3	5:00	Rizin Bantamweight Grand Prix 2021 Opening Round
Featherweight 66 kg	(Japan) Yutaka Saito (c)	def.	(Azerbaijan) Vugar Keramov	Decision (Split)	3	5:00	Non-title bout.
Heavyweight 120 kg	(Japan) Shoma Shibisai	def.	(Japan) Tsuyoshi Sudario	Submission (Rear-Naked Choke)	3	1:38	
Catchweight 73 kg	(Japan) Satoshi Yamasu	def.	(United States) BeyNoah	Decision (Split)	3	5:00	

== Rizin 29 – Osaka ==
Rizin 29 – Osaka
- Promotion: Rizin Fighting Federation
- Date: June 27, 2021
- Venue: Maruzen Intec Arena
- City: Osaka, Japan
- Attendance: 4,796

Rizin 29 – Osaka was a Combat sport event held by Rizin Fighting Federation on June 27, 2021, at the Maruzen Intec Arena in Osaka, Japan. The event was originally scheduled for May 23, but was subsequently postponed due to a state of emergency declared in response to the COVID-19 pandemic.

=== Background ===
This event is expected to host the second half of Rizin Bantamweight Grand Prix initial round fights. The event will be held with 50% capacity, equaling about 5000 spectators.

A four-man 60 kg kickboxing tournament was announced for this event, featuring Ryo Takahashi, Koji, Genji Umeno and Taiju Shiratori.

Two additional kickboxing bouts were scheduled for the event: Seiki Ueyama was set to fight Jyosei Izumi at flyweight, while Yuma Yamahata was scheduled to fight Kiyoto Takahashi in a catchweight bout.

It was announced that the Shooto Lightweight champion Yuki Kawana would fight Yusuke Yachi, while Rikuto Shirakawa would fight Jin Aoi at featherweight.

Two more bouts were announced on May 28: a flyweight bout between the former Pancrase champion Daichi Kitakata and the former DEEP flyweight champion Yusaku Nakamura, as well as a flyweight kickboxing bout between the former Lumpinee and Rajadamnern champion Nadaka Yoshinari and Chikai.

=== Results ===
Rizin 29
Weight Class				Method	Round	T.Time	Notes
Bantamweight 61 kg	(Japan) Taiju Shiratori	def.	(Japan) Koji	Decision (Unanimous)	3	3:00	Rizin KICK Tournament Final
Bantamweight 61 kg	(Japan) Yuto Hokamura	def.	(Japan) Kuya Ito	Decision (Unanimous)	3	5:00	Rizin Bantamweight Grand Prix 2021 Opening Round
Bantamweight 61 kg	(Japan) Takafumi Otsuka	def.	(Japan) Hiroki Yamashita	Decision (Unanimous)	3	5:00	Rizin Bantamweight Grand Prix 2021 Opening Round
Bantamweight 61 kg	(Japan) Kenta Takizawa	def.	(Japan) Masakazu Imanari	Decision (Unanimous)	3	5:00	Rizin Bantamweight Grand Prix 2021 Opening Round
Bantamweight 61 kg	(Brazil) Alan Yamaniha	def.	(Japan) Kazuma Kuramoto	Decision (Unanimous)	3	5:00	Rizin Bantamweight Grand Prix 2021 Opening Round
Lightweight 71 kg	(Japan) Yusuke Yachi	def.	(Japan) Yuki Kawana	Decision (Unanimous)	3	5:00	
Featherweight 66 kg	(Japan) Rikuto Shirakawa	def.	(Japan) Jin Aoi	Decision (Unanimous)	3	5:00	
Bantamweight 61 kg	(Japan) Taiju Shiratori	def.	(Japan) Ryo Takahashi	KO (Punches)	1	1:37	Rizin KICK Tournament Semi Final
Bantamweight 61 kg	(Japan) Koji	-	(Japan) Genji Umeno	No Contest (Accidental Headbutt)	1	0:43	Rizin KICK Tournament Semi Final
Strawweight 52 kg	(Japan) Nadaka Yoshinari	def.	(Japan) Chikai	TKO (Doctor Stoppage)	1	3:00	Kickboxing
Flyweight 57 kg	(Japan) Seiki Ueyama	def.	(Japan) Jyosei Izumi	TKO (Three Knockdowns)	2	1:55	Kickboxing
Catchweight	(Japan) Yuma Yamahata	-	(Japan) Kiyoto Takahashi	Draw (Majority)	3	3:00	Kickboxing

== Rizin 30 - Saitama ==
Rizin 30 - Saitama
- Promotion: Rizin Fighting Federation
- Date: September 19, 2021
- Venue: Saitama Super Arena
- City: Saitama, Japan
- Attendance: 7,580

Rizin 30 - Saitama was a Combat sport event held by Rizin Fighting Federation on September 19, 2021, at the Saitama Super Arena in Saitama, Japan.

=== Background ===
The event would also feature the quarterfinal bouts of the bantamweight Grand Prix.

Ayaka Hamasaki was scheduled to face Emi Fujino in a non-title bout in the co-main event.

Olympic Greco-Roman wrestling silver medalist Shinobu Ota and former K-1 Welterweight champion Yuta Kubo were scheduled to fight in a featherweight bout.

KNOCK OUT 65 kg champion Chihiro Suzuki was scheduled to face the 18-year mixed martial arts veteran Shoji Maruyama in a featherweight bout.

Koji Takeda and Yusuke Yachi were scheduled to face each other in a featherweight bout.

Two UFC veterans, Yoshinori Horie and Ulka Sasaki were scheduled to face each other in a featherweight bout.

A women's atomweight kickboxing bout between Panchan Rina and Momoka Mandokoro was scheduled for the event. It was the first women's kickboxing bout in Rizin history.

=== Results ===
Rizin 30
Weight Class				Method	Round	T.Time	Notes
Bantamweight 61 kg	(Japan) Kai Asakura	def.	(Brazil) Alan Yamaniha	Decision (Unanimous)	3	5:00	Rizin Bantamweight Grand Prix Quarterfinals
Bantamweight 61 kg	(Japan) Naoki Inoue	def.	(Japan) Yuto Hokamura	Decision (Unanimous)	3	5:00	Rizin Bantamweight Grand Prix Quarterfinals
Bantamweight 61 kg	(Japan) Hiromasa Ougikubo	def.	(Japan) Takafumi Otsuka	Decision (Unanimous)	3	5:00	Rizin Bantamweight Grand Prix Quarterfinals
Bantamweight 61 kg	(Japan) Kenta Takizawa	def.	(Japan) Yuki Motoya	TKO (Punches)	1	2:27	Rizin Bantamweight Grand Prix Quarterfinals
Intermission
W.Super Atomweight 49 kg	(Japan) Ayaka Hamasaki (c)	def.	(Japan) Emi Fujino	Decision (Unanimous)	3	5:00	Non-Title bout
Lightweight 70 kg	(Japan) Yusuke Yachi	def.	(Japan) Koji Takeda	Decision (Unanimous)	3	5:00	
Featherweight 66 kg	(Japan) Yoshinori Horie	def.	(Japan) Ulka Sasaki	Decision (Unanimous)	3	5:00	
Featherweight 66 kg	(Japan) Shinobu Ota	def.	(Japan) Yuta Kubo	Decision (Unanimous)	3	5:00	
Featherweight 66 kg	(Japan) Shoji Maruyama	def.	(Japan) Chihiro Suzuki	KO (Punches)	1	0:20	
Atomweight 47 kg	(Japan) Panchan Rina	def.	(Japan) Momoka Mandokoro	Decision (Unanimous)	3	3:00	Kickboxing

== Rizin Landmark Vol.1 ==
Rizin Landmark vol.1
- Promotion: Rizin Fighting Federation
- Date: October 2, 2021
- City: Tokyo, Japan

Rizin Landmark vol.1 was a Combat sport event held by Rizin Fighting Federation on October 2, 2021, in Tokyo, Japan.

=== Background ===
The event was headlined by a 68 kg catchweight bout between Mikuru Asakura and Kyohei Hagiwara.

On August 21, 2021, Rizin announced two bantamweight bouts were announced for the event: Masakazu Imanari would face Takeshi Kasugai, while Shooto Watanabe would face Kuya Ito. Ito later withdrew from his bout with Watanabe due to COVID-19 protocols, and was replaced by Nobutaka Naito.

=== Results ===
Rizin
Weight Class				Method	Round	T.Time	Notes
Catchweight 68 kg	(Japan) Mikuru Asakura	def.	(Japan) Kyohei Hagiwara	Decision (Unanimous)	3	5:00	
Lightweight 70 kg	(Japan) Hiroaki Suzuki	def.	(Japan) Keisuke Okuda	TKO (Knee and Punches)	1	1:42	
Bantamweight 61 kg	(Japan) Masakazu Imanari	def.	(Japan) Takeshi Kasugai	Submission (Armbar)	1	2:50	
Bantamweight 61 kg	(Japan) Shooto Watanabe	def.	(Japan) Nobutaka Naito	Technical Submission (D’Arce Choke)	1	1:33	

== Rizin 31 - Yokohama ==
Rizin 31 - Yokohama
- Promotion: Rizin Fighting Federation
- Date: October 24, 2021
- Venue: Pia Arena
- City: Yokohama, Japan

Rizin 31 - Yokohama was a Combat sport event held by Rizin Fighting Federation on October 24, 2021, at the Pia Arena in Yokohama, Japan.

=== Background ===
A featherweight title fight between the reigning champion Yutaka Saito and title challenger Juntaro Ushiku was scheduled as the event headliner.

A women's super atomweight bout between the reigning Jewels atomweight and DEEP Microweight champion Saori Oshima and the two-time Rizin FF atomweight title challenger Kanna Asakura was announced for the event.

Rizin-regular Tsuyoshi Sudario was scheduled to face Radlein Saint Ilme in a heavyweight bout.

=== Results ===
Rizin 31
Weight Class				Method	Round	T.Time	Notes
Featherweight 66 kg	(Japan) Juntaro Ushiku	def.	(Japan) Yutaka Saito (c)	TKO (Doctor Stoppage)	2	4:26	For the Rizin Featherweight Championship
W.Super Atomweight 49 kg	(Japan) Saori Oshima	def.	(Japan) Kanna Asakura	Decision (Split)	3	5:00	
Heavyweight 120 kg	(Japan) Tsuyoshi Sudario	def.	(United States) Radlein Saint Ilme	KO (Punch)	1	1:51	
Featherweight 66 kg	(Japan) Masanori Kanehara	def.	(Japan) Takahiro Ashida	TKO (Punches and Elbows)	2	1:18	
Intermission
Lightweight 71 kg	(Japan) Akira Okada	def.	(Japan) Daichi Abe	Submission (North-South Choke)	2	4:34	
Featherweight 66 kg	(Japan) Daisuke Nakamura	def.	(Japan) Suguru Nii	Submission (Flying Armbar)	1	2:16	
Featherweight 66 kg	(Japan) Rikuto Shirakawa	def.	(Japan) Takuya Yamamoto	KO (Punches and Soccer Kick)	1	3:48	
Catchweight 53.5 kg	(Japan) Nadaka Yoshinari	vs.	(Japan) Naoki Ishikawa	TKO (3 Knockdowns - Right Hook)	1	2:30	Kickboxing
Flyweight 57 kg	(Japan) Yuki Ito	def.	(Japan) Yusaku Nakamura	TKO (Elbow and Punches)	1	4:52	
Flyweight 57 kg	(Japan) Seiichiro Ito	def.	(Japan) Kunta Hashimoto	Submission (Rear-Naked Choke)	2	4:07	
Catchweight 51 kg	(Japan) Ryuya Okuwaki	def.	(Japan) Ryuto Oinuma	Decision (Majority)	3	3:00	Kickboxing

== Rizin 32 - Okinawa ==
Rizin 32 - Okinawa
- Promotion: Rizin Fighting Federation
- Date: November 20, 2021
- Venue: Okinawa Arena
- City: Okinawa, Japan

Rizin 32 - Okinawa was a Combat sport event held by Rizin Fighting Federation on November 20, 2021, at the Okinawa Arena in Okinawa, Japan.

=== Background ===
The event was headlined by a super-atomweight bout between the 2017 Super Atomweight Grand Prix runner-up Rena Kubota and the one-time Rizin Super Atomweight title challenger Miyuu Yamamoto.

=== Results ===
Rizin 32
Weight Class				Method	Round	T.Time	Notes
W.Super Atomweight 50 kg	(Japan) Rena Kubota	def.	(Japan) Miyuu Yamamoto	TKO (Knee and Punches)	2	3:35	
Bantamweight 61 kg	(Japan) Koji Tanaka	def.	(Japan) Kazuma Sone	Decision (Unanimous)	3	3:00	Kickboxing
Catchweight 58.5 kg	(Japan) Yoshiro Maeda	def.	(Japan) Mitsuhisa Sunabe	Decision (Unanimous)	3	5:00	
Heavyweight 120 kg	(Nigeria) Bobby Ologun	def.	(Japan) Katsuya Kitamura	Submission (Rear-Naked Choke)	2	2:34	
Catchweight 72 kg	(United States) BeyNoah	def.	(Democratic Republic of the Congo) Daryl Lokoku	KO (Punch)	3	1:09	
Intermission
Catchweight 72 kg	(Japan) Juri Ohara	def.	(Japan) Kohei Tokeshi	TKO (Soccer Kicks and Punches)	1	1:16	
Flyweight 57 kg	(Japan) Haruo Ochi	def.	(Japan) Tatsuya So	Decision (Unanimous)	3	5:00	
Flyweight 57 kg	(Japan) Yuichi Miyagi	def.	(Japan) Tomohiro Adaniya	KO (Knee)	1	0:47	
W.Super Atomweight 49 kg	(Japan) Mizuki Oshiro	def.	(Japan) Aira Koga	Decision (Split)	3	5:00	
Catchweight 74 kg	(United States) Tanner Lourenco	def.	(Japan) Shinya Kumazawa	Submission (Okuri Eri Jime)	2	1:34	
Catchweight 73 kg	(Japan) Hirokatsu Miyagi	def.	(Japan) Lopez Satsuma	KO (Punch)	1	2:39	Kickboxing
Catchweight 58 kg	(Japan) Sho Sekihara	def.	(Japan) Takahiro Kuniyoshi	Decision (Unanimous)	3	5:00	
Catchweight 55 kg	(Japan) Ryoga Terayama	def.	(Japan) Hiroki Kinjo	Decision (Unanimous)	3	3:00	Kickboxing

== Rizin Trigger 1 ==
Rizin Trigger 1
- Promotion: Rizin Fighting Federation
- Date: November 28, 2021
- Venue: World Memorial Hall
- City: Kobe, Japan

Rizin Trigger 1 was a Combat sport event held by Rizin Fighting Federation on November 28, 2021, at the World Memorial Hall in Kobe, Japan.

=== Background ===
The inaugural Rizin Trigger event marked the first time in-which matches took place in a cage, rather than a ring.

=== Results ===
Rizin Trigger 1
Weight Class				Method	Round	T.Time	Notes
Featherweight 66 kg	(Japan) Kyohei Hagiwara	def.	(Japan) Shoji Maruyama	TKO (Punch and Soccer Kick)	2	1:19	
Catchweight 68 kg	(Japan) Yoshinori Horie	def.	(Japan) Hirotaka Nakada	Decision (Unanimous)	3	5:00	
Welterweight 77 kg	(Japan) Kiichi Kunimoto	def.	(Japan) Takahiro Kawanaka	Submission (Arm-Triangle Choke)	1	4:10	
Welterweight 77 kg	(Japan) Ryuichiro Sumimura	def.	(Japan) Yasaku Kinoshita	Disqualification (Fence Grabbing)	2	2:34	
Bantamweight 61 kg	(Japan) Mamoru Uoi	def.	(Japan) Hiroki Yamashita	KO (Punch and Soccer Kick)	1	4:53	
Flyweight 57 kg	(Japan) Tatsuki Saomoto	def.	(Japan) Takashi Matsuba	Decision (Split)	3	5:00	
Intermission
Featherweight 66 kg	(Japan) Chihiro Suzuki	def.	(Japan) Sora Yamamoto	Decision (Unanimous)	3	5:00	
Catchweight 73 kg	(United States) Grant Bogdanove	def.	(Japan) Keisuke Okuda	Submission (Rear-Naked Choke)	1	1:07	
Bantamweight 61 kg	(Japan) Daiki Tsubota	def.	(Japan) Makoto Kamaya	KO (Flying Knee)	2	2:49	
Catchweight 53 kg	(Japan) Jin Mandokoro	def.	(Japan) Yu Hiramatsu	KO (Punch)	2	1:08	Kickboxing
Bantamweight 61 kg	(Thailand) Tepparith	def.	(Japan) Hiroto Ichimura	KO (Punch)	2	2:54	Kickboxing
W.Catchweight 46 kg	(Japan) Momoka Mandokoro	def.	(Japan) Miku	Decision (Unanimous)	3	3:00	Kickboxing
Bantamweight 61 kg	(Japan) Kenji Kato	def.	(Japan) Katsuya Fujiwara	TKO (Injury)	2	1:21	
Catchweight 55 kg	(Japan) Tsubasa Morii	def.	(Japan) Fujimon	Decision (Unanimous)	3	3:00	Kickboxing

== Rizin 33 - Saitama ==
Rizin 33 - Saitama
- Promotion: Rizin Fighting Federation
- Date: December 31, 2021
- Venue: Saitama Super Arena
- City: Saitama, Japan
- Attendance: 22,499

Rizin 33 - Saitama was a Combat sport event held by Rizin Fighting Federation on December 31, 2021, at the Saitama Super Arena in Saitama, Japan.

=== Background ===
A Rizin Lightweight Championship title bout between reigning champion Roberto de Souza and title challenger Yusuke Yachi was scheduled as the event headliner.

Rizin Bantamweight Grand Prix Semi-final bouts were scheduled to take place during the event.

=== Results ===
Rizin 33
Weight Class				Method	Round	T.Time	Notes
Bantamweight 61 kg	(Japan) Hiromasa Ougikubo	def.	(Japan) Kai Asakura	Decision (Unanimous)	3	5:00	Rizin Bantamweight Grand Prix Finals
Lightweight 71 kg	(Brazil) Roberto de Souza (c)	def.	(Japan) Yusuke Yachi	Submission (Triangle Armbar)	2	3:30	For the Rizin Lightweight Championship
Featherweight 66 kg	(Japan) Mikuru Asakura	def.	(Japan) Yutaka Saito	Decision (Unanimous)	3	5:00	
Catchweight	(Japan) Tenshin Nasukawa	-	(Japan) Takanori Gomi	Draw (Time Limit)	2	3:00	Special Standing Bout Rules
W.Catchweight 50 kg	(South Korea) Si Woo Park	def.	(Japan) Rena Kubota	Decision (Unanimous)	3	5:00	
Intermission
W.Super Atomweight 49 kg	(Japan) Seika Izawa	def.	(Japan) Ayaka Hamasaki (c)	TKO (Elbows and Punches)	2	2:50	Non-Title Bout
Lightweight 71 kg	(Japan) Koji Takeda	def.	(United States) BeyNoah	Submission (Armbar)	2	4:12	
Heavyweight 120 kg	(Japan) Hideki Sekine	def.	(Japan) Shoma Shibisai	TKO (Punches)	2	2:09	
Featherweight 66 kg	(Japan) Kyohei Hagiwara	def.	(Japan) Hiroaki Suzuki	Decision (Unanimous)	3	5:00	
Catchweight 62 kg	(Japan) YA-MAN	def.	(Japan) Koji Tanaka	Decision (Majority)	3	3:00	Kickboxing
Catchweight 90 kg	(Japan) Hikaru Saito	def.	(Japan) Yuta Kubo	Technical Submission (Armbar)	1	2:16	Special Rules
Bantamweight 61 kg	(Japan) Shinobu Ota	def.	(Japan) Kazuma Sone	TKO (Soccer Kicks and Stomps)	2	3:55	
Bantamweight 61 kg	(Japan) Yuki Motoya	def.	(Japan) Yuto Hokamura	Decision (Unanimous)	3	5:00	Rizin Bantamweight Grand Prix Reserve Bout
Bantamweight 61 kg	(Japan) Hiromasa Ougikubo	def.	(Japan) Naoki Inoue	Decision (Unanimous)	3	5:00	Rizin Bantamweight Grand Prix Semi-finals
Bantamweight 61 kg	(Japan) Kai Asakura	def.	(Japan) Kenta Takizawa	Decision (Unanimous)	3	5:00	Rizin Bantamweight Grand Prix Semi-finals
Featherweight 66 kg	(Japan) Kota Miura	def.	(Japan) Yushi	TKO (Soccer Kick and Punch)	1	3:00	Special Rules

== See also ==
- List of current Rizin FF fighters
- 2021 in UFC
- Bellator MMA in 2021
- 2021 in ONE Championship
- 2021 in Konfrontacja Sztuk Walki
- 2021 in Absolute Championship Akhmat
- 2021 in Road FC
