= 2020 in Rizin Fighting Federation =

Information
- First date: February 22, 2020
- Last date: December 31, 2020

Events
- Total events: 6

Fights
- Total fights: 67
- Title fights: 4

Chronology
2019 in Rizin Fighting Federation	2020 in Rizin Fighting Federation	2021 in Rizin Fighting Federation

The year 2020 was the sixth year in the history of the Rizin Fighting Federation, a mixed martial arts promotion based in Japan. The year began with Rizin 21 in Hamamatsu on February 22, 2020. The COVID-19 pandemic would put the promotion on hiatus until Rizin 22 on August 9.

Rizin events are broadcast through a television agreement with Fuji Television. In North America and Europe, Rizin events were available via PPV on FITE TV. Beginning with Rizin 26, events have been streaming on LIVENow in North America and Europe.

== List of events ==
#	Event	Date	Venue	Location	Attendance
1	Rizin 21 – Hamamatsu	February 22, 2020	Hamamatsu Arena	Hamamatsu, Japan	6,832
2	Rizin 22 – Starting Over	August 9, 2020	Pia Arena MM	Yokohama, Japan	2,805
3	Rizin 23 – Calling Over	August 10, 2020	Pia Arena MM	Yokohama, Japan	4,410
4	Rizin 24 – Saitama	September 27, 2020	Saitama Super Arena	Saitama, Japan	5,000
5	Rizin 25 – Osaka	November 21, 2020	Osaka-jō Hall	Osaka, Japan	5,487
6	Rizin 26 – Saitama	December 31, 2020	Saitama Super Arena	Saitama, Japan	9,978

== Rizin 21 – Hamamatsu ==
Rizin 21 – Hamamatsu
- Promotion: Rizin Fighting Federation
- Date: February 22, 2020
- Venue: Hamamatsu Arena
- City: Hamamatsu, Japan
- Attendance: 6,832

Event chronology
Rizin 20	Rizin 21 – Hamamatsu

Rizin 21 – Hamamatsu was a Combat sport event held by the Rizin Fighting Federation on February 22, 2020 at the Hamamatsu Arena in Hamamatsu, Japan.

=== Results ===
Rizin 21
Weight Class				Method	Round	T.Time	Notes
Catchweight 68 kg	(Japan) Mikuru Asakura	def.	(Mexico) Daniel Salas	TKO (Head Kick and Punches)	2	7:34	
Bantamweight 61 kg	(United States) Victor Henry	def.	(Japan) Masanori Kanehara	TKO (Punches)	2	5:45	
Heavyweight 120 kg	(Guam) Roque Martinez	def.	(Japan) Hideki Sekine	TKO (Soccer Kicks)	1	4:04	
Catchweight 79 kg	(Brazil) Marcos de Souza	def.	(Portugal) Falco Neto	TKO (Punches)	1	1:27	
Intermission
Bantamweight 61 kg	(Japan) Yuto Hokamura	def.	(Japan) Kenji Kato	Submission (Rear-Naked Choke)	1	4:21	
Exhibition	(Brazil) Roberto de Souza	def.	(Japan) Yuki Nakai	Submission (Triangle Choke)	1	8:05	Jiu Jitsu Elimination Match
Exhibition	(Brazil) Roberto de Souza	def.	(Japan) Hiroshi Shinagawa	Submission (Triangle Choke)	1	8:05	Jiu Jitsu Elimination Match
Exhibition	(Brazil) Roberto de Souza	def.	(Japan) Edison Kagohara	Submission (Choke)	1	8:05	Jiu Jitsu Elimination Match
Exhibition	(Brazil) Roberto de Souza	def.	(Japan) Koji Shigemizu	Submission (Armbar)	1	8:05	Jiu Jitsu Elimination Match
Exhibition	(Brazil) Roberto de Souza	def.	(Japan) Yuna Kimura	Submission (Rear-Naked Choke)	1	8:05	Jiu Jitsu Elimination Match
Bantamweight 61 kg	(Japan) Naoki Inoue	def.	(Australia) Trent Girdham	Decision (Unanimous)	3	15:00	
Featherweight 66 kg	(Azerbaijan) Vugar Karamov	def.	(Guam) Kyle Aguon	Decision (Unanimous)	3	15:00	
Heavyweight 120 kg	(Japan) Kousuke Jitukata	def.	(Japan) Ryo Sakai	KO (Punches)	1	1:28	Kickboxing
Flyweight 57 kg	(Japan) Kenichi Takeuchi	def.	(Japan) Naoya	Decision (Unanimous)	3	9:00	Kickboxing
Opening Fight
Catchweight 60 kg	(Bolivia) Henrry Cejas	def.	(Japan) Seido	Decision (Unanimous)	3	9:00	Kickboxing
Lightweight 70 kg	(Japan) Yuya	def.	(Japan) Kouki	KO (Punch)	1	2:30	Kickboxing
Catchweight 59 kg	(Japan) Masaji Tozuka	-	(Japan) Masahiro Ozawa	Draw (Majority)	3	9:00	Kickboxing

== Rizin 22 – Starting Over ==
Rizin 22 – Starting Over
- Promotion: Rizin Fighting Federation
- Date: August 9, 2020
- Venue: Pia Arena MM
- City: Yokohama, Japan
- Attendance: 2,805

Rizin 22 – Starting Over was a Combat sport event held by Rizin Fighting Federation on August 9, 2020 at the Pia Arena MM in Yokohama, Japan.

=== Background ===
The event was initially planned to be held on April 19, 2020 at the Yokohama Arena in Yokohama, Japan However, the event was cancelled on April 2, 2020, due to the prevailing COVID-19 pandemic.

=== Results ===
Rizin 22
Weight Class				Method	Round	T.Time	Notes
Lightweight 71 kg	(Brazil) Roberto de Souza	def.	(Japan) Yusuke Yachi	TKO (Punches)	1	1:52	
W.Strawweight 52 kg	(Japan) Ayaka Hamasaki	def.	(Japan) Tomo Maesawa	Submission (Kimura)	2	6:26	
W.Super Atomweight 49 kg	(Japan) Kanna Asakura	def.	(Japan) Mizuki Furuse	TKO (Punches)	1	1:35	
Bantamweight 61 kg	(Japan) Naoki Inoue	def.	(Japan) Shooto Watanabe	Submission (Rear-Naked Choke)	1	1:40	
Catchweight 56 kg	(Japan) Rui Ebata	def.	(Japan) Seiki Ueyama	Decision (Unanimous)	3	9:00	Kickboxing
Catchweight 50.8 kg	(Japan) Nadaka Yoshinari	def.	(Japan) Yuushin	TKO (Referee Stoppage)	2	8:08	Kickboxing
Featherweight 66 kg	(Japan) Tetsuya Seki	def.	(Japan) Kouya Kanda	TKO (Punches)	2	8:47	
Featherweight 66 kg	(Japan) Kyohei Hagiwara	def.	(Japan) Rikuto Shirakawa	TKO (Punches)	3	14:40	
Bantamweight 61 kg	(Japan) Kenji Kato	def.	(Japan) Erson Yamamoto	KO (Punch)	1	3:32	

== Rizin 23 – Calling Over ==
Rizin 23 – Calling Over
- Promotion: Rizin Fighting Federation
- Date: August 10, 2020
- Venue: Pia Arena MM
- City: Yokohama, Japan
- Attendance: 4,410

Rizin 23 – Calling Over was a Combat sport event held by Rizin Fighting Federation on August 10, 2020 at the Pia Arena MM in Yokohama, Japan.

=== Background ===
A Rizin Bantamweight Championship bout for the vacant title between former title challenger Kai Asakura and Hiromasa Ougikubo served as the event headliner. Former Rizin Bantamweight champion Manel Kape announced on March 30, 2020 that he would be relinquishing the bantamweight title and announce he has signed a multi-fight deal with the UFC.

=== Results ===
Rizin 23
Weight Class				Method	Round	T.Time	Notes
Bantamweight 61 kg	(Japan) Kai Asakura	def.	(Japan) Hiromasa Ougikubo	TKO (Soccer Kicks)	1	4:31	For the vacant Rizin Bantamweight Championship
Bantamweight 61 kg	(Japan) Yuki Motoya	def.	(Japan) Mamoru Uoi	Submission (Guillotine Choke)	3	12:19	
Featherweight 66 kg	(Japan) Yutaka Saito	def.	(Japan) Kazumasa Majima	TKO (Knees and Elbow)	2	5:24	
Bantamweight 61 kg	(Japan) Kento Haraguchi	def.	(Japan) Taiga Kawabe	TKO (Punches)	1	2:50	Kickboxing
Featherweight 66 kg	(Japan) Jin Aoi	def.	(Japan) Kotetsu Boku	Decision (Unanimous)	3	15:00	
Catchweight 59 kg	(Japan) Makoto Shinryu	def.	(Japan) Seiichiro Ito	Submission (Guillotine Choke)	2	9:30	
Catchweight 73 kg	(Japan) Kaito Ono	def.	(Democratic Republic of the Congo) Daryl Lokoku	Decision (Unanimous)	3	9:00	Kickboxing
Flyweight 58 kg	(Japan) Tatsuki Saomoto	def.	(Japan) Yusaku Nakamura	KO (Punches)	1	4:06	
Catchweight 73 kg	(Japan) Shintaro Matsukura	def.	(Japan) Koji Mori	KO (Punches)	1	1:28	Kickboxing

== Rizin 24 – Saitama ==
Rizin 24 - Saitama
- Promotion: Rizin Fighting Federation
- Date: September 27, 2020
- Venue: Saitama Super Arena
- City: Saitama, Japan
- Attendance: 5,000

Rizin 24 – Saitama was a Combat sport event held by Rizin Fighting Federation on September 27, 2020 at the Saitama Super Arena in Saitama, Japan.

=== Background ===
The first two fights announced for Rizin 24 was a bantamweight bout between Kai Asakura and Shoji Maruyama, as well as a women's strawweight bout between Rena Kubota and Emi Tomimatsu. A fight between two MMA veterans was announced as well, as Takasuke Kume took on Satoru Kitaoka. The main event was a kickboxing fight between Tenshin Nasukawa and Koji.

=== Results ===
Rizin 24
Weight Class				Method	Round	T.Time	Notes
Catchweight 58.5 kg	(Japan) Tenshin Nasukawa	def.	(Japan) Koji	Decision (Unanimous)	3	9:00	Kickboxing
Bantamweight 61 kg	(Japan) Kai Asakura	def.	(Japan) Shoji Maruyama	TKO (Punches and Soccer Kick)	1	2:37	Non-title bout.
Lightweight 71 kg	(Japan) Koji Takeda	def.	(Japan) Yuki Kawana	Decision (Split)	3	15:00	
Lightweight 71 kg	(Japan) Takasuke Kume	def.	(Japan) Satoru Kitaoka	Decision (Split)	3	15:00	
Catchweight 60 kg	(Japan) Taishi Hiratsuka	def.	(Japan) Yuuki Kitagawa	KO (Punch)	2	3:27	Kickboxing
Bantamweight 61 kg	(Japan) Kenta Takizawa	def.	(Japan) Yuto Hokamura	Decision (Split)	3	15:00	
W. Strawweight 52 kg	(Japan) Rena Kubota	def.	(Japan) Emi Tomimatsu	Decision (Unanimous)	3	15:00	
Featherweight 66 kg	(Japan) Takahiro Ashida	def.	(Japan) Kyohei Hagiwara	Submission (Triangle Choke)	2	9:25	
Heavyweight 120 kg	(Japan) Sudario Tsuyoshi	Def.	(New Zealand) Dylan James	TKO (Doctor Stoppage)	1	5:00	
Catchweight 55 kg	(Japan) Mutsuki Ebata	def.	(Japan) Rasta	Decision (Unanimous)	3	9:00	Kickboxing
Lightweight 71 kg	(Japan) Juri Ohara	def.	(Japan) Yusuke Yachi	Decision (Split)	3	15:00	

== Rizin 25 – Osaka ==
Rizin 25 – Osaka
- Promotion: Rizin Fighting Federation
- Date: November 21, 2020
- Venue: Osaka-jō Hall
- City: Osaka, Japan
- Attendance: 5,487

Rizin 25 – Osaka was a Combat sport event held by Rizin Fighting Federation on November 21, 2020 at the Osaka-jō Hall in Osaka, Japan.

=== Background ===
During the press conference prior to Rizin 25, Rizin CEO Nobuyuki Sakakibara confirmed that nine fights were finalized for the card.

Rizin standout Mikuru Asakura will fight the former Shooto Lightweight champion Yutaka Saito for the inaugural featherweight title. Former Bantamweight title challenger Hiromasa Ougikubo is scheduled to fight Kenta Takizawa. Former strawweight King of Pancrase Daichi Kitakata is scheduled to face the ZST Flyweight champion Tatsuki Saomoto.

Two additional MMA bouts were announced: Yojiro Uchimura vs. Kyohei Hagiwara in the featherweight division and Ryuichiro Sumimura vs. Gota Yamashita in the welterweight division. The remaining four fights are kickboxing bouts: Taiga Kawabe will fight Yuma Yamahata, Yuma Yamaguchi is scheduled to fight Shohei Asahara, Hidenori Ebata will take on Isami Sano and Jin Mandokoro is set to go up against Syuto Sato. A fight between Kotetsu Boku and Rikuto Shirakawa was later added to the card.

=== Results ===
Rizin 25
Weight Class				Method	Round	T.Time	Notes
Featherweight 66 kg	(Japan) Yutaka Saito	def.	(Japan) Mikuru Asakura	Decision (Unanimous)	3	15:00	For the inaugural Rizin Featherweight Championship
Bantamweight 61 kg	(Japan) Hiromasa Ougikubo	def.	(Japan) Kenta Takizawa	Decision (Unanimous)	3	15:00	
Welterweight 77 kg	(Japan) Ryuichiro Sumimura	def.	(Japan) Gota Yamashita	Decision (Split)	3	15:00	
Flyweight 57 kg	(Japan) Tatsuki Saomoto	def.	(Japan) Daichi Kitakata	Decision (Unanimous)	3	15:00	
Exhibition	(Brazil) Roberto de Souza (Japan) Kleber Koike Erbst		(Japan) Hari Sakamoto (Japan) Misaki Akita				Grappling Demonstration
Intermission
Featherweight 66 kg	(Japan) Kyohei Hagiwara	def.	(Japan) Yojiro Uchimura	KO (Punches and Foot Stomp)	1	0:22	
Catchweight 60.5 kg	(Japan) Taiga Kawabe	def.	(Japan) Yuma Yamahata	Decision (Unanimous)	3	9:00	Kickboxing
Catchweight 83 kg	(Japan) Isami Sano	def.	(Japan) Hidenori Ebata	Decision (Unanimous)	3	9:00	Kickboxing
Featherweight 66 kg	(Japan) Rikuto Shirakawa	def.	(Japan) Kotetsu Boku	TKO (Punches and Soccer Kick)	3	14:19	
Catchweight 53 kg	(Japan) Jin Mandokoro	def.	(Japan) Syuto Sato	Decision (Unanimous)	3	9:00	Kickboxing
Catchweight 63 kg	(Japan) Shohei Asahara	def.	(Japan) Yuma Yamaguchi	TKO (Punches)	3	8:59	Kickboxing

== Rizin 26 – Saitama ==
Rizin 26 – Saitama
- Promotion: Rizin Fighting Federation
- Date: December 31, 2020
- Venue: Saitama Super Arena
- City: Saitama, Japan
- Attendance: 9,978

Event chronology
Rizin 26 – Saitama	Rizin 27

Rizin 26 – Saitama was a combat sport event held by Rizin Fighting Federation on December 31, 2020 at the Saitama Super Arena in Saitama, Japan.

=== Background ===
The card was headlined by a rematch for the Rizin bantamweight championship, in his first title defense the reigning bantamweight champion Kai Asakura has met the former champion Kyoji Horiguchi. The two met previously in a non-title bout, with Asakura winning by knockout.

Olympic silver medalist Shinobu Ota, has signed with Rizin Fighting Championship, he made his MMA debut against the veteran Hideo Tokoro.

Former RIZIN Super Atomweight champion Ayaka Hamasaki was set to fight Miyuu Yamamoto for the vacant Super Atomweight title.

Tenshin Nasukawa was scheduled to fight Kumandoi Phetjaroenvit, while Takanori Gomi was scheduled to fight Koji under special standup rules. Gomi's weight limit was 75 kg and Koji's 65 kg. The rules of the bout forbid grappling and kicking, while both fighters wore 12oz gloves.

Sakura Mori missed weight for her atomweight bout with Eru Takebayashi by 1.7 kg.

=== Results ===
Rizin 26
Weight Class				Method	Round	T.Time	Notes
Bantamweight 61 kg	(Japan) Kyoji Horiguchi	def.	(Japan) Kai Asakura (c)	TKO (Punches)	1	2:48	For the Rizin Bantamweight Championship
Catchweight 57 kg	(Japan) Tenshin Nasukawa	def.	(Thailand) Kumandoi Petcharoenvit	Decision (Unanimous)	3	9:00	Kickboxing
Catchweight 68 kg	(Japan) Mikuru Asakura	def.	(Japan) Satoshi Yamasu	KO (Head Kick and Punches)	1	4:20	
Catchweight 75 kg	(Japan) Takanori Gomi	def.	(Japan) Koji Tanaka	Decision (Majority)	3	9:00	Special Standing Bout Rules
W.Super Atomweight 49 kg	(Japan) Ayaka Hamasaki	def.	(Japan) Miyuu Yamamoto	Submission (Head Scissors Choke)	1	1:42	For the Vacant Rizin Super Atomweight Championship
Intermission
Bantamweight 61 kg	(Japan) Naoki Inoue	def.	(Japan) Yuki Motoya	Submission (Rear-Naked Choke)	1	3:00	
Catchweight 67 kg	(Japan) Kleber Koike Erbst	def.	(United States) Kyle Aguon	Technical Submission (Brabo Choke)	1	4:21	
Catchweight 68 kg	(Japan) Kyohei Hagiwara	def.	(Japan) Ren Hiramoto	TKO (Corner Stoppage)	2	1:29	
Bantamweight 61 kg	(Japan) Hideo Tokoro	def.	(Japan) Shinobu Ota	Submission (Armbar)	2	2:23	
Intermission
Catchweight 50 kg	(Japan) Nadaka Yoshinari	def.	(Thailand) Phetmalai Phetjaroenvit	KO (Elbow)	1	2:19	Kickboxing
Bantamweight 61 kg	(Japan) Ulka Sasaki	def.	(Japan) Kenta Takizawa	Decision (Unanimous)	3	5:00	
W.Super Atomweight 49 kg	(Japan) Kanna Asakura	def.	(Japan) Ai Shimizu	Decision (Unanimous)	3	5:00	
Openweight	(Japan) Atsushi Saito	def.	(Japan) Hiroya Kawabe	Submission (Armbar)	2	6:00	Special Rules originally a draw was overturned by Rizin officials
Catchweight 63 kg	(Japan) Kazuma Kuramoto	def.	(Japan) Taiyo Nakahara	KO (Soccer Kicks)	1	2:12	
Heavyweight 120 kg	(Japan) Tsuyoshi Sudario	def.	(Japan) Ikuhisa Minowa	TKO (Leg Injury)	1	3:17	
W.Catchweight 52.7 kg	(Japan) Sakura Mori	-	(Japan) Eru Takebayashi	Submission (Armbar)	1	1:37	No Contest due to Mori missing weight by 1.7 kg.

== See also ==
- 2020 in UFC
- Bellator MMA in 2020
- 2020 in ONE Championship
- 2020 in Konfrontacja Sztuk Walki
- 2020 in Absolute Championship Akhmat
- 2020 in Road FC
