= Takanofuji Sanzō =

Japanese sumo wrestler

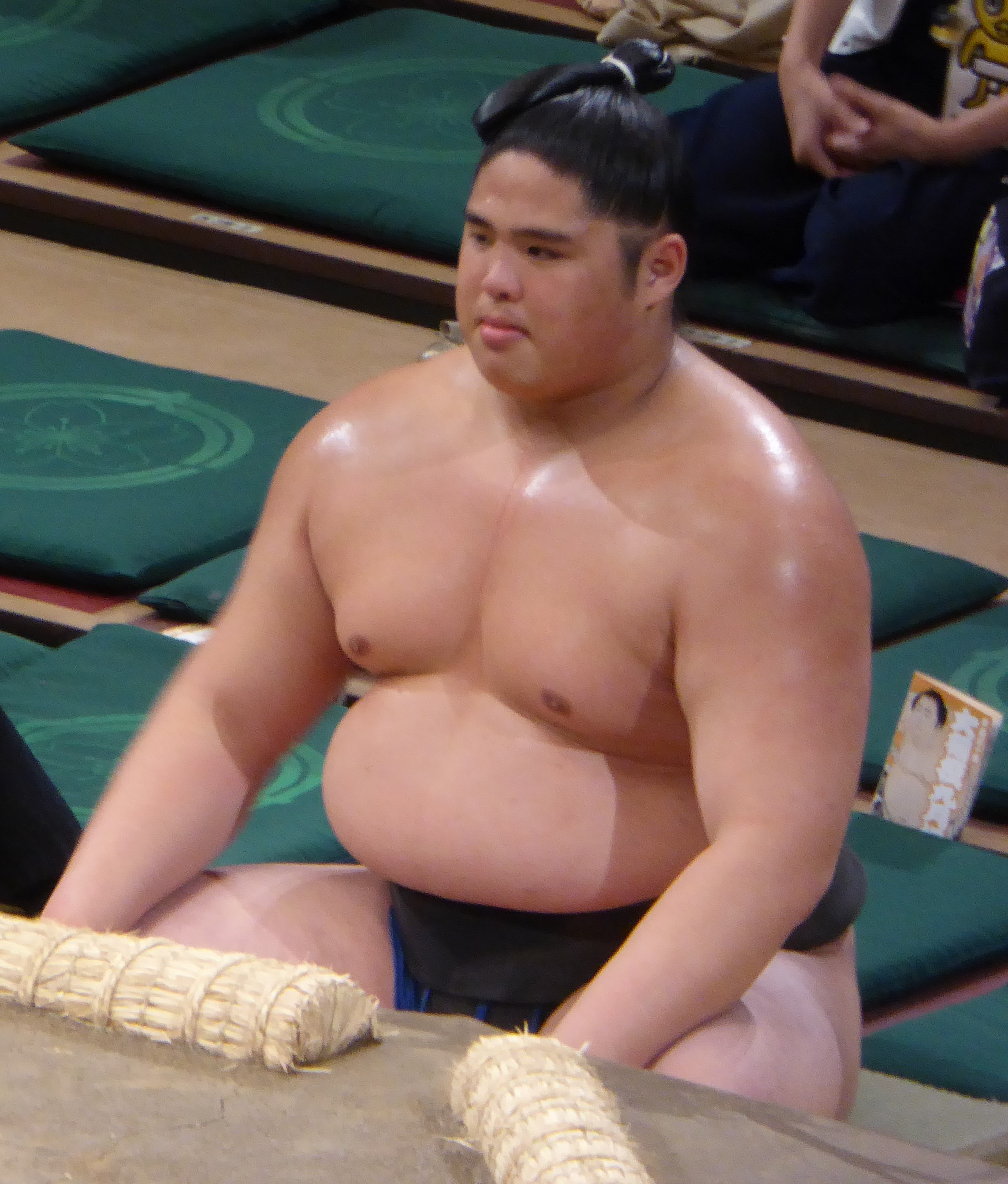

Personal information
- Native name: 貴ノ富士三造
- Born: Tsuyoshi Kamiyama; May 13, 1997 (age 29)
- Height: 1.90 m (6 ft 3 in)
- Weight: 157 kg (346 lb)

Sport
- Sport: Sumo
- Retired: October 2019
- Heya: Takanohana → Chiganoura
- Record: 165–112–28
- Debut: March 2013
- Highest rank: Jūryō 5 (Sept 2019)
- Championships: 1 (Makushita)
- Updated on 11 October 2019

Takanofuji Sanzō (born 13 May 1997 as Tsuyoshi Kamiyama, also known as Tsuyoshi Sudario) is a former professional sumo wrestler and current mixed martial artist from Sakai, Ibaraki, Japan. He made his professional debut in March 2013 and his highest rank was jūryō 5. He is the twin brother of former makuuchi division wrestler Takagenji, and they are the first twins to both reach the second highest jūryō division. He won one makushita division championship. He was suspended from the September 2019 tournament after an investigation found he had struck an attendant, and was asked to retire by the Japan Sumo Association. After initially refusing to comply, he retired on 11 October 2019.

== Background ==
He was born as Tsuyoshi Kamiyama in Oyama, Tochigi Prefecture. He has a Japanese father and Filipino mother. He is the older of two twins, and is distinguished from his brother by the fact that he has a mole near his upper lip. They also have an older sister. They grew up in Sakai, Ibaraki Prefecture. Their sister played soccer in national competitions at high school and the twins both played basketball, representing Ibaraki Prefecture in national competition and coming in third place.

Tsuyoshi got married in November 2019.

== Sumo career ==
The brothers had no amateur sumo experience but were encouraged by their father to give professional sumo a try. They joined Takanohana stable in March 2013. Tsuyoshi initially wrestled under the shikona of Takayoshitoshi and made his jūryō debut in March 2018. With his brother Takagenji already in the division it was the first time in sumo history that twins had both achieved sekitori status. However he withdrew partway through that tournament and was suspended from the next for assaulting his personal attendant or tsukebito after a match. He was reportedly angry that the attendant was late in telling him the time of his match, making him late entering the stadium. His absence resulted in him falling back to the makushita division. His stablemaster, former yokozuna Takanohana, was demoted in the Sumo Association's hierarchy for failing to report the incident to them and subsequently decided to leave the Sumo Association altogether. Upon the resignation of his stablemaster Takayoshitoshi moved along with his stablemates to Chiganoura stable in October 2018.

He returned to jūryō in March 2019 under his new name of Takanofuji, although he lasted only one tournament before being demoted. In May he won the makushita championship or yūshō with a perfect 7–0 score, ensuring his return to jūryō. In July 2019 he was ranked at jūryō 12, his highest rank to date, with his brother Takagenji making his top makuuchi division debut in the same tournament. Takanofuji had his best result in the division, an 11–4 record, which ensured a new highest rank of jūryō 5 for the following tournament. However, this was to be his final tournament appearance.

=== Retirement from sumo ===
He was withdrawn by his new stablemaster Chiganoura from the September 2019 tournament after it emerged that he had once again assaulted an attendant after a practice session on 31 August. The incident was investigated by Japan Sumo Association's compliance committee which on September 26 recommended that he retire. He had been found to have hit his attendant in the forehead with his fist, and also used derogatory language toward him and two other attendants. However, the following day Takanofuji held a press conference in which he said he would not go voluntarily because "this penalty is too heavy and I can't accept it." His retirement was urged by his stablemaster, and the Sumo Association said they would take disciplinary measures against him at a later meeting which could involve a forced retirement. Takanofuji was accompanied by a lawyer at his press conference and he said he had written to the Sumo Association asking for a lighter penalty, and sent a petition to the Japan Sports Agency seeking better governance of professional sumo. He moved out of the stable to an apartment and refused to deal directly with his stablemaster, asking his lawyer to be the intermediary.

On 11 October 2019 his retirement was announced by the Japan Sumo Association. Through his attorney Takanofuji said, "I still wanted to continue, but my interactions with the Sumo Association left me exhausted." His decision to retire before harsher penalties were imposed meant he was entitled to severance pay.

== Fighting style ==
Takanofuji was a yotsu-sumo wrestler, who sought a grip on the mawashi rather than pushing or thrusting. His preferred grip was migi-yotsu, a right hand inside and left hand outside position. His most common winning kimarite was a straightforward yori-kiri or force out.

== Career record ==
Takanofuji Sanzō
Year	January Hatsu basho, Tokyo	March Haru basho, Osaka	May Natsu basho, Tokyo	July Nagoya basho, Nagoya	September Aki basho, Tokyo	November Kyūshū basho, Fukuoka
2013	x	(Maezumo)	West Jonokuchi #13; 5–2	East Jonidan #61; 5–2	East Jonidan #25; 3–4	East Jonidan #46; 5–2
2014	West Jonidan #9; 3–4	West Jonidan #26; 5–2	West Sandanme #92; 3–4	East Jonidan #9; 5–2	East Sandanme #74; 6–1	East Sandanme #19; 4–3
2015	West Sandanme #6; 5–2	West Makushita #42; 4–3	East Makushita #37; 2–5	East Makushita #57; 4–3	East Makushita #47; 5–2	East Makushita #28; 1–6
2016	West Makushita #53; 6–1	West Makushita #38; 3–4	West Makushita #45; 3–4	West Makushita #53; 6–1	West Makushita #24; 2–5	East Makushita #39; 4–3
2017	West Makushita #30; 6–1	East Makushita #11; 2–5	East Makushita #25; 4–3	East Makushita #21; 4–3	West Makushita #15; 4–3	West Makushita #11; 4–3
2018	East Makushita #7; 5–2	East Jūryō #14; 3–6–6	West Makushita #9; Suspended; 0–0–7	West Makushita #49; 6–1	West Makushita #21; 5–2	East Makushita #10; 5–2
2019	East Makushita #3; 5–2	West Jūryō #13; 6–9	West Makushita #2; 7–0; Champion	East Jūryō #12; 11–4	West Jūryō #5; Suspended; 0–0–15	West Makushita #5; Retired –
Record given as wins–losses–absences Top division champion Top division runner-up Retired Lower divisions Non-participation Sanshō key: F=Fighting spirit; O=Outstanding performance; T=Technique Also shown: ★=Kinboshi; P=Playoff(s); Divisions: Makuuchi — Jūryō — Makushita — Sandanme — Jonidan — Jonokuchi Makuuchi ranks: Yokozuna — Ōzeki — Sekiwake — Komusubi — Maegashira

== Mixed martial arts career ==
Tsuyoshi Sudario
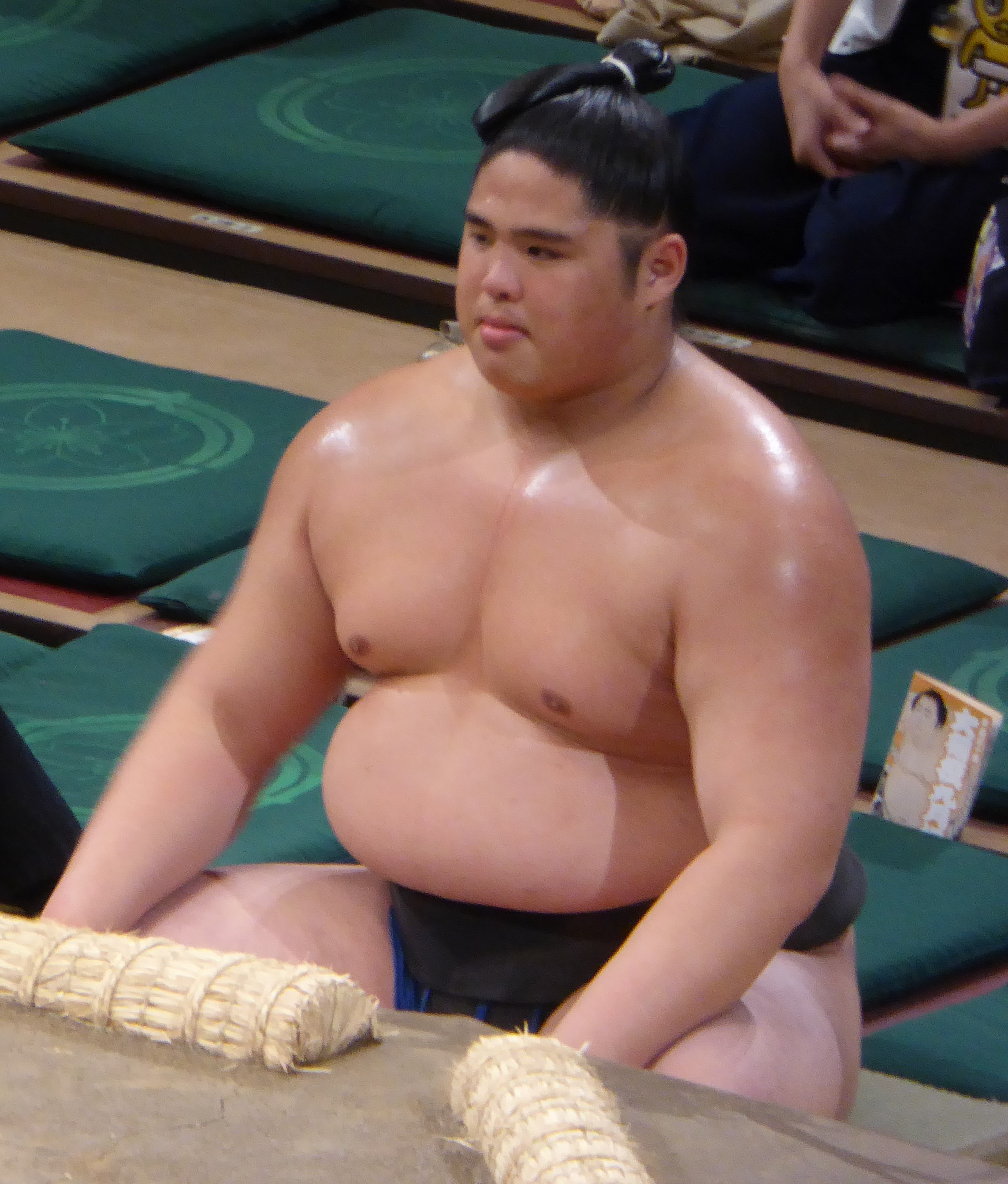
- Born: Tsuyoshi Kamiyama; May 13, 1997 (age 29); Oyama, Tochigi, Japan
- Native name: 貴ノ富士三造
- Other names: Takanofuji Sanzō
- Height: 6 ft 3 in (191 cm)
- Weight: 261 lb (118 kg; 18 st 9 lb)
- Division: Heavyweight
- Style: Sumo
- Team: Purebred Gym (2020–present); T's Kickboxing Gym; Watanabe Boxing Gym
- Trainer: Enson Inoue
- Years active: 2020–present (MMA)

Mixed martial arts record
- Total: 14
- Wins: 10
- By knockout: 9
- By decision: 1
- Losses: 4
- By knockout: 2
- By submission: 1
- By decision: 1

Other information
- Mixed martial arts record from Sherdog

After concluding his sumo wrestling career, Takanofuji said in an interview in July 2020 that he was training to become an MMA fighter and hoped to enter a Rizin event. In order to be eligible to compete in the heavyweight division in mixed martial arts, Sudario lost around 110 pounds (50 kg) before his debut.

He made his professional debut against James Raideen on September 27 at Rizin 24. He won the fight via doctor stoppage after the first round.

Takanofuji made his sophomore appearance in the sport against Ikuhisa Minowa at Rizin 26 on December 31, 2020. He won the fight via first-round technical knockout.

Sudario faced Kazushi Miyamoto at Rizin 27 on March 21, 2021. He won quickly via knockout eight seconds into the bout. Sudario kept punching even as the ref was pulling him off, causing a brawl to break out. Sudario was subsequently fined with a 25 percent pay cut due to the incident.

Sudario faced Shoma Shibisai at Rizin 28 on June 13, 2021. He lost the bout via rear-naked choke in the third round.

Sudario faced Saint at Rizin 31 on October 24, 2021. He won the bout via knockout in the first round.

Sudario faced Hideki Sekine at Rizin 37 on July 31, 2021. He won the fight by a first-round knockout, stopping Sekine 53 seconds into the opening round.

Sudario faced Janos Csukas on October 23, 2022 at Rizin 39. Sudario won the fight via TKO in the second round.

Sudario faced Junior Tafa on December 31, 2022 at Rizin 40. Sudario lost the fight via TKO in the second round.

Sudario faced Roque Martinez at Rizin Landmark 5 on April 29, 2023. He won the fight by unanimous decision.

Sudario was expected to face Todd Duffee at Rizin Landmark 6 on October 1, 2023. However, Duffee was forced to withdraw from the bout on September 28, due to visa issues, and was replaced by Lim Dong-hwan. Sudario won the fight via TKO in the third round.

Sudario faced Mikio Ueda on December 31, 2023, at Rizin 45. He lost the bout vis TKO stoppage at the beginning of the second round.

== Mixed martial arts record ==
Professional record breakdown
14 matches	10 wins	4 losses
By knockout	9	2
By submission	0	1
By decision	1	1

Res.	Record	Opponent	Method	Event	Date	Round	Time	Location	Notes
Win	10–4	Ryo Sakai	TKO (soccer kick and punches)	Rizin 54	August 11, 2026	1	4:26	Tokyo, Japan	Rizin Japan Heavyweight Grand Prix Semifinal.
Loss	9–4	José Augusto Azevedo	Decision (unanimous)	Rizin: Otoko Matsuri	May 4, 2025	3	5:00	Tokyo, Japan	2025 Rizin Heavyweight Grand Prix Quarterfinal.
Win	9–3	Hisaki Kato	TKO (doctor stoppage)	Rizin Landmark 10	November 17, 2024	3	1:11	Nagoya, Japan	
Loss	8–3	Mikio Ueda	TKO (knee and punches)	Rizin 45	December 31, 2023	2	0:55	Saitama, Japan	
Win	8–2	Lim Dong-hwan	TKO (punches)	Rizin Landmark 6	October 1, 2023	3	2:10	Nagoya, Japan	
Win	7–2	Roque Martinez	Decision (unanimous)	Rizin Landmark 5	April 29, 2023	3	5:00	Tokyo, Japan	
Loss	6–2	Junior Tafa	TKO (punches)	Rizin 40	December 31, 2022	1	1:38	Saitama, Japan	
Win	6–1	Janos Csukas	TKO (punches and knee)	Rizin 39	October 23, 2022	2	0:30	Fukuoka, Japan	
Win	5–1	Hideki Sekine	KO (punch)	Rizin 37	July 31, 2022	1	0:53	Saitama, Japan	
Win	4–1	Lawdlain Saint-Ilme	KO (punch)	Rizin 31	October 24, 2021	1	1:51	Yokohama, Japan	
Loss	3–1	Shoma Shibisai	Submission (rear-naked choke)	Rizin 28	June 13, 2021	3	1:39	Tokyo, Japan	
Win	3–0	Kazushi Miyamoto	KO (punch)	Rizin 27	March 21, 2021	1	0:08	Nagoya, Japan	
Win	2–0	Ikuhisa Minowa	TKO (leg kick and punch)	Rizin 26	December 31, 2020	1	3:17	Saitama, Japan	
Win	1–0	Dylan James	TKO (doctor stoppage)	Rizin 24	September 27, 2020	1	5:00	Saitama, Japan	Heavyweight debut.

== See also ==
- List of past sumo wrestlers
- Controversies in professional sumo
- Glossary of sumo terms
- List of male mixed martial artists
- List of current Rizin FF fighters
