= Hiromasa Ougikubo =

Japanese mixed martial artist (born 1987)

- Born: April 1, 1987 (age 39); Kuji, Iwate, Japan
- Native name: 扇久保博正
- Nationality: Japanese
- Height: 5 ft 3 in (1.60 m)
- Weight: 123 lb (56 kg; 8 st 11 lb)
- Division: Featherweight; Bantamweight; Flyweight
- Reach: 65 in (165 cm)
- Stance: Orthodox
- Fighting out of: Chiba, Japan
- Team: The Blackbelt Japan
- Years active: 2006–present

Mixed martial arts record
- Total: 41
- Wins: 30
- By knockout: 1
- By submission: 6
- By decision: 23
- Losses: 9
- By knockout: 2
- By submission: 2
- By decision: 5
- Draws: 2

Amateur record
- Total: 11
- Wins: 10
- By decision: 10
- Losses: 1
- By decision: 1

Other information
- Website: https://ougikubo.com/
- Mixed martial arts record from Sherdog

Hiromasa Ougikubo (扇久保 博正, Ōgikubo Hiromasa; born 1 April 1987) is a Japanese mixed martial artist currently competing as a flyweight in the Rizin Fighting Federation. A professional since 2006, he has also competed for Shooto, Vale Tudo Japan, and The Ultimate Fighter.

He is a former Rizin Flyweight Champion, a former Shooto World Bantamweight (123 lb) Champion, a former Shooto Featherweight Champion and the 2014 Vale Tudo Japan flyweight tournament champion. As an amateur, he was the 12th All Japan Amateur Shooto Featherweight tournament champion and the 4th Tohoku Amateur Shooto Open Tournament champion.

He holds notable wins over the former ONE Championship and Shooto strawweight champion Yosuke Saruta, the former Pancrase Flyweight Champion Kiyotaka Shimizu, the current Pancrase Bantamweight Champion Shintaro Ishiwatari, as well as wins over Alexandre Pantoja and Adam Antolin.

== Mixed martial arts career ==
=== Shooto ===
Hiromasa Ougikubo began his mixed martial arts career in 2005, as an amateur in Shooto. He first competed in the East Japan Amateur Shooto Freshman tournament, where he lost the finals. Following that loss he entered and won the 4th Tohoku Amateur Shooto Open Tournament. His last amateur appearance was at the 12th All Japan Amateur Shooto Featherweight Championship Tournament. Ougikubo defeated all four of his opponents to win the tournament.

Ougikubo made his professional debut with Shooto in 2006, when he defeated Nobuhiro Hayakawa by a unanimous decision. After a draw against Naoki Yahagi, Ougikubo would beat Satoru Ota and Kazuya Tamura to set up a fight in the Shooto Rookie Featherweight tournament finals fight against Yasuhiro Kanayama. He won the bout in the second round by way of a rear naked choke.

Over the next five years, Ougikubo would accumulate a 5-2-1 record, most notably losing to the future Shooto Featherweight Champion Koetsu Okazaki, and winning the Shooto Pacific Rim featherweight title by defeating Teriyuki Matsumoto. In 2012, at Shooto 5th Round, Ougikubo would get a chance to avenge that loss. Hiromasa would win the fight in the third minute of the third round, by way of a rear naked choke, in what was considered, at the time, a major upset. His first title defense was scheduled against the young prospect Kyoji Horiguchi. Horiguchi would defend or reverse the takedowns, deliver ground and pound from the guard, and would eventually submit Ougikubo in the second round.

Looking to bounce back, Ougikubo entered the 2014 Vale Tudo Japan Flyweight tournament. In the quarterfinals he defeated Takeshi Kasugai by a majority decision. In the semifinals he submitted Kana Hyatt in the first round. Proceeding to the finals against Czar Sklavos, Ougikubo came out the victor after 25 minutes, being declared the tournament champion, by a clear unanimous decision.

Returning to Shooto he was scheduled to face Mamoru Yamaguchi. The fight had to cancelled, after Ougikubo dislocated his shoulder.

His next fight was scheduled against Yosuke Saruta, which he won by a unanimous decision. This gave him his second chance at Shooto gold, as he was set to fight the bantamweight champion Masaaki Sugawara. He won the fight in the last seconds of the fifth round by a guillotine choke.

=== The Ultimate Fighter ===
Considered a standout fighter in the Asian MMA scene, with an impressive fight style and being undefeated in three years, Ougikubo was invited to the 24th season of The Ultimate Fighter, called The Ultimate Fighter: Tournament of Champions.

His first fight was against the EFC flyweight champion Nkazimulo Zulu. Ougikubo entered the fight as a favorite, being the no.5 seed, while Zulu was the no.12 seed. Ougikubo submitted Zulu in the second round, with a rear naked choke.

Next, he faced Adam Antolin, in a fight between two high level grapplers. Ougikubo would aggressively out grapple Antolin, with the American being forced to defend for the entirety of the fight. The Japanese fighter won a clear unanimous decision.

Ougikubo would then face the no.1 seed Alexandre Pantoja. He would force wrestling exchanges with Pantoja, working from his opponents guard, grinding away a unanimous decision win.

In his final fight of the show, Ougikubo fought against Tim Elliott. He fell short for the first time, and lost the finals by a unanimous decision.

=== Return to Shooto ===
Returning to Shooto he fought against the Ultimate Fighting Championship veteran Danny Martinez.

He would then defend the Shooto World Bantamweight (123 lb) Championship against Tadaaki Yamamoto. He won the fight with a rear naked choke to defend his Shooto title.

=== Rizin Fighting Federation ===
Ougikubo signed with Rizin and made his debut at Rizin 11, when he was scheduled to rematch Kyoji Horiguchi. Horiguchi once again won, this time through a unanimous decision.

Ougikubo fought the former Shooto and ONE Championship champion Yoshitaka Naito in a Shooto exhibition bout. The fight ended in a no contest after just three minutes.

Making his second bantamweight title defense, Ougikubo faced Kiyotaka Shimizu. While the fight saw little action in the first three rounds, Ougikubo managed to cut his opponent with a head kick. In the fourth round a head clash ended the fight prematurely and went to the judge's scorecards. Hiromasa won a unanimous decision to secure his second title defense.

Returning to Rizin, he fought against the former DEEP champion Yuki Motoya. Ougikubo won a split decision.

During Rizin 20, he fought against Shintaro Ishiwatari. He won another split decision.

He fought against Kai Asakura for the Rizin Bantamweight Championship at Rizin 23. He lost via first-round knockout.

Ougikubo was scheduled to fight Kenta Takizawa during Rizin 25. He defeated Takizawa by unanimous decision.

On January 31, 2021, Ougikubo vacated the Shooto Shooto Bantamweight (123 lb) Championship.

==== Rizin Bantamweight Grand Prix 2021 ====
Ougikubo faced Takeshi Kasugai in the opening round of the Bantamweight Grand Prix at Rizin 28 on June 13, 2021. Ougikubo won the fight by unanimous decision. Ougikubo faced Takafumi Otsuka in the quarterfinals on September 19, 2021 at Rizin 30. He won the fight by unanimous decision.

In the semi-finals, Ougikubo faced Naoki Inoue on December 31, 2021 at Rizin 33. He won the fight by unanimous decision, and faced Kai Asakura in the tournament finals, which were held during Rizin 33 as well. He won the bout via unanimous decision, winning the 2021 Rizin Bantamweight Grand Prix.

==== Later Rizin career ====
Ougikubo was booked to face the Road FC Featherweight champion Soo Chul Kim at Rizin 38 on September 25, 2022. Although he was scrambled from start to finish, he was outnumbered by Kim's punches and suffered two facial fractures, resulting in a 0-3 unanimous decision loss.

Moving down to Flyweight, Ougikubo faced Kyoji Horiguchi at Bellator MMA vs. Rizin on December 31, 2022. Facing Horiguchi for the third time in his career, Ougikubo lost the bout via unanimous decision, making it the third straight loss to Horiguchi.

Stepping in as a replacement for an injured Kai Asakura, Ougikubo faced former Bellator Bantamweight Champion Juan Archuleta for the vacant Rizin Bantamweight Championship title on July 30, 2023, as part of the Bellator MMA x Rizin 2 card. He lost the bout via unanimous decision.

Ougikubo faced John Dodson on December 31, 2023, at Rizin 45, and won the bout via unanimous decision.

Ougikubo faced Makoto Takahashi on July 28, 2024 at Super Rizin 3, and won the bout via unanimous decision.

=== Flyweight champion ===
Ougikubo faced Jose Torres in the quarterfinals of the 2025 Rizin Flyweight Grand Prix, which were held at Super Rizin 4 on July 27, 2025. He won the fight by unanimous decision. Ougikubo faced Alibek Gadzhammatov in the tournament semifinals, held at Rizin 51 on September 28, 2025. He once again won the fight by unanimous decision. Ougikubo faced Yuki Motoya in the Grand Prix finals at Rizin: Shiwasu no Cho Tsuwamono Matsuri on December 31, 2025. He won the fight by unanimous decision.

Ougikubo faced Makoto Takahashi for the Rizin flyweight title on June 6, 2026, at Rizin Landmark 14. He lost the title by unanimous decision.

== Championships and accomplishments ==
=== Amateur titles ===
- Shooto
  - 12th All Japan Amateur Shooto Featherweight Tournament Championship
  - 4th Tohoku Amateur Shooto Open Tournament

=== Professional titles ===
- Shooto
  - 2007 Shooto Rookie Featherweight Tournament Champion
  - Shooto Pacific Rim Featherweight Championship (One time; Former)
  - Shooto Flyweight Championship (One time; Former)
    - Two successful title defenses
  - Shooto Bantamweight Championship (One time; Former)
- Vale Tudo Japan
  - 2014 VTJ Flyweight Tournament Championship
- Rizin Fighting Federation
  - 2021 Rizin Bantamweight Grand Prix Champion
  - 2025 Rizin Flyweight Grand Prix Champion
  - Rizin Flyweight Championship (One time; Current)
- eFight.com
  - October 2014 and December 2021 Fighter of the Month

== Mixed martial arts record ==
Professional record breakdown
41 matches	30 wins	9 losses
By knockout	1	2
By submission	6	2
By decision	23	5
Draws	2	

Res.	Record	Opponent	Method	Event	Date	Round	Time	Location	Notes
Loss	30–9–2	Makoto Takahashi	Decision (unanimous)	Rizin Landmark 14	June 6, 2026	3	5:00	Sendai, Japan	Lost the Rizin Flyweight Championship.
Win	30–8–2	Yuki Motoya	Decision (unanimous)	Rizin: Shiwasu no Cho Tsuwamono Matsuri	December 31, 2025	3	5:00	Saitama, Japan	Won the 2025 Rizin Flyweight Grand Prix and the vacant Rizin Flyweight Championship.
Win	29–8–2	Alibek Gadzhammatov	Decision (unanimous)	Rizin 51	September 28, 2025	3	5:00	Nagoya, Japan	2025 Rizin Flyweight Grand Prix Semifinal.
Win	28–8–2	Jose Torres	Decision (unanimous)	Super Rizin 4	July 27, 2025	3	5:00	Saitama, Japan	2025 Rizin Flyweight Grand Prix Quarterfinal.
Win	27–8–2	Makoto Takahashi	Decision (unanimous)	Super Rizin 3	July 28, 2024	3	5:00	Saitama, Japan	
Win	26–8–2	John Dodson	Decision (unanimous)	Rizin 45	December 31, 2023	3	5:00	Saitama, Japan	Return to Flyweight.
Loss	25–8–2	Juan Archuleta	Decision (unanimous)	Super Rizin 2	July 30, 2023	3	5:00	Saitama, Japan	For the vacant Rizin Bantamweight Championship.
Loss	25–7–2	Kyoji Horiguchi	Decision (unanimous)	Bellator MMA vs. Rizin	December 31, 2022	3	5:00	Saitama, Japan	Flyweight bout.
Loss	25–6–2	Soo Chul Kim	Decision (unanimous)	Rizin 38	September 25, 2022	3	5:00	Saitama, Japan	
Win	25–5–2	Kai Asakura	Decision (unanimous)	Rizin 33	December 31, 2021	3	5:00	Saitama, Japan	Won the 2021 Rizin Bantamweight Grand Prix.
Win	24–5–2	Naoki Inoue	Decision (unanimous)	Rizin 33	December 31, 2021	3	5:00	Saitama, Japan	2021 Rizin Bantamweight Grand Prix Semifinal.
Win	23–5–2	Takafumi Otsuka	Decision (unanimous)	Rizin 30	September 19, 2021	3	5:00	Saitama, Japan	2021 Rizin Bantamweight Grand Prix Quarterfinal.
Win	22–5–2	Takeshi Kasugai	Decision (unanimous)	Rizin 28	June 13, 2021	3	5:00	Tokyo, Japan	2021 Rizin Bantamweight Grand Prix Opening Round.
Win	21–5–2	Kenta Takizawa	Decision (unanimous)	Rizin 25	November 21, 2020	3	5:00	Osaka, Japan	
Loss	20–5–2	Kai Asakura	KO (knee and soccer kicks)	Rizin 23	August 10, 2020	1	4:31	Yokohama, Japan	For the vacant Rizin Bantamweight Championship.
Win	20–4–2	Shintaro Ishiwatari	Decision (split)	Rizin 20	December 31, 2019	3	5:00	Saitama, Japan	
Win	19–4–2	Yuki Motoya	Decision (split)	Rizin 17	July 28, 2019	3	5:00	Saitama, Japan	Return to Bantamweight.
Win	18–4–2	Kiyotaka Shimizu	Technical Decision (unanimous)	Shooto 30th Anniversary Tour at Korakuen Hall	May 6, 2019	4	0:40	Tokyo, Japan	Defended the Shooto Flyweight Championship.
Loss	17–4–2	Kyoji Horiguchi	Decision (unanimous)	Rizin 11	July 28, 2018	2	5:00	Saitama, Japan	60 kg catchweight bout
Win	17–3–2	Tadaaki Yamamoto	Submission (rear-naked choke)	Professional Shooto 10/15	October 15, 2017	1	4:26	Chiba, Japan	Defended the Shooto Flyweight Championship.
Win	16–3–2	Danny Martinez	Decision (unanimous)	Professional Shooto 4/23	April 23, 2017	3	5:00	Chiba, Japan	Flyweight bout.
Win	15–3–2	Masaaki Sugawara	Technical Submission (guillotine choke)	Mobstyles Presents Fight & Mosh	April 23, 2016	5	4:48	Chiba, Japan	Won the Shooto Flyweight Championship.
Win	14–3–2	Yosuke Saruta	Decision (unanimous)	Professional Shooto 11/29	November 29, 2015	3	5:00	Chiba, Japan	
Win	13–3–2	Czar Sklavos	Decision (unanimous)	VTJ 6th	October 4, 2014	5	5:00	Tokyo, Japan	Won the VTJ Flyweight Tournament.
Win	12–3–2	Kana Hyatt	Submission (rear-naked choke)	VTJ 5th in Osaka	June 28, 2014	1	1:20	Osaka, Japan	VTJ Flyweight Tournament Semifinal.
Win	11–3–2	Takeshi Kasugai	Decision (majority)	VTJ 4th	February 23, 2014	3	5:00	Tokyo, Japan	VTJ Flyweight Tournament Quarterfinal.
Loss	10–3–2	Kyoji Horiguchi	Submission (rear-naked choke)	Shooto - 2nd Round 2013	March 16, 2013	2	1:35	Tokyo, Japan	Lost the Shooto Bantamweight Championship.
Win	10–2–2	Koetsu Okazaki	Submission (rear-naked choke)	Shooto - 5th Round	May 18, 2012	3	3:32	Tokyo, Japan	Won the Shooto Bantamweight Championship.
Win	9–2–2	Tetsu Suzuki	Decision (unanimous)	Survivor Tournament Final	January 8, 2012	3	5:00	Tokyo, Japan	
Win	8–2–2	Teruyuki Matsumoto	Decision (majority)	Shooto - Border: Season 3 - Spring Thunder	April 3, 2011	3	5:00	Osaka, Japan	Won the Shooto Pacific Rim Featherweight Championship.
Win	7–2–2	So Tazawa	Decision (unanimous)	The Way of Shooto 5: Like a Tiger, Like a Dragon	September 23, 2010	3	5:00	Tokyo, Japan	
Loss	6–2–2	Eduardo Dantas	Submission (rear-naked choke)	The Way of Shooto 3: Like a Tiger, Like a Dragon	May 30, 2010	3	1:21	Tokyo, Japan	
Loss	6–1–2	Koetsu Okazaki	TKO (punches)	Shooto - Gig Tokyo 3	October 18, 2009	2	2:08	Tokyo, Japan	
Win	6–0–2	Tetsu Suzuki	Decision (unanimous)	Shooto Tradition 6	March 20, 2009	3	5:00	Tokyo, Japan	
Draw	4–0–2	So Tazawa	Draw	Shooto Tradition 4	November 29, 2008	3	5:00	Tokyo, Japan	
Win	4–0–1	Hiroyuki Tanaka	TKO (punches)	Shooto Tradition 2	July 18, 2008	1	1:35	Tokyo, Japan	
Win	4–0–1	Yasuhiro Kanayama	Submission (rear-naked choke)	Shooto - Rookie Tournament 2007 Final	December 8, 2007	2	3:35	Tokyo, Japan	Won the Shooto Rookie Featherweight Tournament.
Win	3–0–1	Kazuya Tamura	Submission (rear-naked choke)	Shooto - Back To Our Roots 5	September 22, 2007	1	3:43	Tokyo, Japan	
Win	2–0–1	Satoru Ota	Decision (unanimous)	Shooto 2007 - 6/30 in Kitazawa Town Hall	June 30, 2007	2	5:00	Tokyo, Japan	
Draw	1–0–1	Naoki Yahagi	Draw	Shooto - It's Strong Being a Man	March 4, 2007	2	5:00	Tokyo, Japan	
Win	1–0	Nobuhiro Hayakawa	Decision (unanimous)	Shooto 2006 - 10/1 in Kitazawa Town Hall	October 1, 2006	2	5:00	Tokyo, Japan	

=== Mixed martial arts exhibition record ===
Exhibition record breakdown		
6 matches	4 wins	1 loss
By submission	1	0
By decision	3	1
No contests	1	

Res.	Record	Opponent	Method	Event	Date	Round	Time	Location	Notes
NC	3–1 (1)	Yoshitaka Naito	No contest	THE SHOOTO OKINAWA vol.1	November 25, 2018	1	3:00	Okinawa, Japan	
Loss	3–1	Tim Elliott	Decision (unanimous)	The Ultimate Fighter: Tournament of Champions	August 10, 2016	3	5:00	Las Vegas, Nevada, United States	TUF 24 Final round
Win	3–0	Alexandre Pantoja	Decision (unanimous)	The Ultimate Fighter: Tournament of Champions	August 3, 2016	2	5:00	Las Vegas, Nevada, United States	TUF 24 Semi-final round
Win	2–0	Adam Antolin	Decision (unanimous)	The Ultimate Fighter: Tournament of Champions	July 26, 2016	2	5:00	Las Vegas, Nevada, United States	TUF 24 Quarter-final round
Win	1–0	Nkazimulo Zulu	Submission (rear-naked choke)	The Ultimate Fighter: Tournament of Champions	July 15, 2016	2	3:44	Las Vegas, Nevada, United States	TUF 24 Round of 16

=== Amateur mixed martial arts record ===
Amateur record breakdown		
11 matches	10 wins	1 loss
By decision	10	1

Res.	Record	Opponent	Method	Event	Date	Round	Time	Location	Notes
Win	10–1	Atsushi Asano	Decision (unanimous)	12th All Japan Amateur Shooto Championship	18 September 2005	2	3:00	Tokyo, Japan	Won the Shooto Amateur Featherweight Tournament
Win	9–1	Kazuya Tamura	Decision (unanimous)	12th All Japan Amateur Shooto Championship	18 September 2005	1	4:00	Tokyo, Japan	Shooto Amateur Featherweight Tournament Semifinals
Win	8–1	Kobe Takuyaki	Decision (unanimous)	12th All Japan Amateur Shooto Championship	18 September 2005	1	4:00	Tokyo, Japan	Shooto Amateur Featherweight 2nd Round
Win	7–1	Akitoshi Mori	Decision (unanimous)	12th All Japan Amateur Shooto Championship	18 September 2005	1	4:00	Tokyo, Japan	Shooto Amateur Featherweight 1st Round
Win	6–1	Yuichiro Takase	Decision (unanimous)	4th Tohoku Amateur Shooto Open Tournament	24 July 2005	2	3:00	Tōhoku, Japan	Won the Tohoku Amateur Shooto Open Tournament
Win	5–1	Yoshihiko Matsumoto	Decision (unanimous)	4th Tohoku Amateur Shooto Open Tournament	24 July 2005	1	4:00	Tōhoku, Japan	Tohoku Amateur Shooto Open Tournament Semifinals
Win	4–1	Kikuchi	Decision (unanimous)	4th Tohoku Amateur Shooto Open Tournament	24 July 2005	1	4:00	Tōhoku, Japan	Tohoku Amateur Shooto Open Tournament Quarterfinals
Loss	3–1	Takahiro Ogoshi	Decision (unanimous)	East Japan Amateur Shooto Freshman tournament	24 July 2005	1	4:00	N/A, Japan	East Japan Amateur Shooto Freshman tournament finals
Win	3–0	Yuki Yasunaga	Decision (unanimous)	East Japan Amateur Shooto Freshman tournament	24 July 2005	1	4:00	N/A, Japan	East Japan Amateur Shooto Freshman tournament semifinals
Win	2–0	Masato Seki	Decision (unanimous)	East Japan Amateur Shooto Freshman tournament	24 July 2005	1	4:00	N/A, Japan	East Japan Amateur Shooto Freshman tournament 2nd Round
Win	1–0	Yosuke Ota	Decision (unanimous)	East Japan Amateur Shooto Freshman tournament	24 July 2005	1	4:00	N/A, Japan	East Japan Amateur Shooto Freshman tournament 1st Round

== See also ==
- List of current Rizin FF fighters
- List of male mixed martial artists
