= Kazushi Miyamoto =

Japanese professional wrestler (born 1979)

Personal information
- Born: February 22, 1979 (age 47) Fukushima Prefecture, Japan

Professional wrestling career
- Ring name(s): The Great Kazushi; Kazushi Miyamoto; Miyamoto
- Billed height: 1.80 m (5 ft 11 in)
- Billed weight: 107 kg (236 lb)
- Trained by: AJPW Dojo
- Debut: August 19, 2001

Kazushi Miyamoto (宮本 和志, Miyamoto Kazushi; born February 22, 1979) is a Japanese professional wrestler.

== Career ==
Kazushi Miyamoto will forever have the distinction of being the first post-split graduate of the All Japan Pro Wrestling dojo. While in the Dojo Miyamoto was trained by Hiroshi Hase, Johnny Smith, and his mentor Toshiaki Kawada. Miyamoto was so serious about wrestling for All Japan, he originally asked Giant Baba in 1996, but was denied due to his young age. After completing training in the Dojo, Miyamoto debuted on August 19, 2001 against Hiroshi Hase. A Jr. Heavyweight when he debuted, for the remainder of the year he opened cards and wrestled different veterans to help him hone his craft. He started 2002 off by pickingup his first pinfall victory in a tag team match, and a couple days later he had his first singles victory over Yasu Urano. For the rest of 2002 he continued wrestling towards the beginning of the card, waiting for his chance to elevate to a more meaningful role.

In 2003, Miyamoto would finally get that chance. In the "Royal Road Initiation 7 Match 'Intense' Series", Miyamoto would face off against Genichiro Tenryu on 2/16/03. Also in February 2003 he formed a tag team with Tomoaki Honma called "Turmeric Storm". As Turmeric Storm they would be staples of the mid-card, picking up victories over teams such as Shigeo Okumura and Taichi Ishikari, Hideki Hosaka and Ryuji Hijikata, Gran Naniwa and Jun Kasai, and many others. On February 11, 2004 they would challenge Great Kosuke and Shiryu for the All Asia Tag Team Championship, but they would lose when Shiryu pinned Miyamoto. Soon after, Miyamoto would begin his excursion, traveling to America.

Miyamoto would stay in America for over a year, wrestling for a variety of wrestling promotions. Wrestling both as himself and "The Great Kazushi" (a gimmick similar to The Great Muta), Miyamoto wrestled in Professional Championship Wrestling, USA Pro Wrestling, Border City Wrestling, River City Wrestling, and others. He also wrestled in TNA Wrestling debuting on TNA Impact! and would be featured there several times, including in a match against Triple X. On June 23, 2004 he appeared on PPV to team with NOSAWA to wrestle America's Most Wanted challenging for the NWA World Tag Team Championship. His last appearance for the company would be at Victory Road 04', where both he and NOSAWA competed in a X-Division Gauntlet, which was won by Hector Garza. Besides TNA, Miyamoto made two appearances in Ring of Honor. On July 23, he defeated Shawn Daivari and on July 24 he wrestled in a six man match with Trent Acid winning. Overall gain much experience as he had experienced wrestling in many different promotions and even won the River City Wrestling Heavyweight Championship in 2005.

During the summer of 2005, Miyamoto would return to All Japan. On July 15, 2005 he wrestled Akira Raijin in his return match, winning in less than four minutes to show his growth. His return to All Japan would not last long, however, as on November 22, 2005 it was announced that Miyamoto was leaving All Japan for a new promotion called Kings Road. Originally Kings Road was rumored to have Toshiaki Kawada as their ace, but Kawada never appeared for the promotion. Defecting with Miyamoto included All Japan wrestler Shota Takanishi and Genichiro Tenryu.

On the main event of the first Kings Road event, Miyamoto main evented against legend Genichiro Tenryu, with Tenryu picking up the victory. Miyamoto continued being the ace of Kings Road, main eventing against Takao Omori on the February event and teaming with Taichi Ishikari against Mitsuya Nagai and Daisuke Ikeda at the April event. By now the promotion was in serious trouble, as Kawada's participation never materialized and they had no wrestlers that were draws as Tenryu had only wrestled on the first event. Their next two events would be held in much smaller venues (with the attendance under 500 for both), and on July 1, 2006 the main event would be a special 5 vs. 5 match against Zero-One Max, with the stipulation being that if Kings Road lost then they would disband. Kings Road would lose the match resulting in Kings Road folding for good.

After Kings Road went under, Miyamoto failed to gain entrance back into a major promotion. He had wrestled in New Japan during his Kings Road stint, facing Tanahashi on March 19, 2006, but it did not lead to a permanent position. On January 20, 2007 he appeared in Osaka Pro Wrestling as the secret new member of Bad Force Stable, but he only wrestled on one card and was not seen again. He also wrestled for Riki Choshu's Lock Up Promotion in mid-2007 but he was not invited back. Unable to find steady work, Miyamoto created his own promotion in the fall of 2007 called Super Bulls with himself being the ace of the promotion. After a few brief months Super Bulls held its last show in December 2007. He wrestled Great Sasuke in the main event with Sasuke picking up the victory by DQ. Miyamoto is still young, in 2008, Miyamoto still has not found his way onto a full-time roster although he has gotten a look from Pro Wrestling Noah, wrestling for there spinoff promotion Pro Wrestling SEM as well as Tatsumi Fujinami's Dradition promotion.

In January 2014, Miyamoto began working for Wrestle-1, billed as the "Japanese Million Dollar Man".

In February 2015, Miyamoto began working for Union Pro Wrestling, where he formed a heel stable with Fuma and Sagat.

Kazushi made his MMA debut against former sumo Tsuyoshi Sudario at Rizin 27 on March 21, 2021. He lost quickly via knockout eight seconds into the bout. Sudario kept punching even as the ref was pulling him off, causing a brawl to break out.

== Mixed martial arts record ==
Professional record breakdown
1 match	0 wins	1 loss
By knockout	0	1

Res.	Record	Opponent	Method	Event	Date	Round	Time	Location	Notes
Loss	0–1	Tsuyoshi Sudario	KO (punches)	Rizin 27	March 21, 2021	1	0:08	Nagoya, Japan	

== Championships and accomplishments ==
- All Japan Pro Wrestling
  - January 3 Korakuen Hall Junior Heavyweight Battle Royal (2002)
- Apache Army
  - WEW Tag Team Championship (2 times) – with Daisaku Shimoda (1) and Tomohiko Hashimoto (1)
- European Wrestling Promotion
  - EWP World Heavyweight Championship (1 time)
- High Impact Wrestling (Houston)
  - HIW Heavyweight Championship (1 time)
- National Wrestling Alliance
  - NWA World Tag Team Championship (1 time) – with Rob Terry
- River City Wrestling
  - RCW Heavyweight Championship (1 time)
- Texas Wrestling Entertainment
  - TWE Heavyweight Championship (1 time)
