= Shinobu Ota =

Japanese Greco-Roman wrestler and mixed martial artist (born 1993)

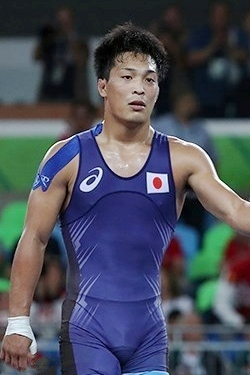
- Ota at the 2016 Summer Olympics
- Born: Ōta Shinobu; December 28, 1993 (age 32); Gonohe, Aomori, Japan
- Native name: 太田 忍
- Nationality: Japanese
- Height: 5 ft 5 in (1.65 m)
- Weight: 135 lb (61 kg; 9.6 st)
- Division: Bantamweight
- Style: Wrestling
- Stance: Orthodox
- Fighting out of: Chiba, Japan
- Team: The Blackbelt Japan
- Years active: 2020–present (MMA)

Mixed martial arts record
- Total: 15
- Wins: 8
- By knockout: 4
- By submission: 2
- By decision: 2
- Losses: 7
- By knockout: 2
- By submission: 3
- By decision: 2

Other information
- Mixed martial arts record from Sherdog

Shinobu Ota (太田 忍, Ōta Shinobu; born December 28, 1993) is a Japanese mixed martial artist and former Greco-Roman wrestler who currently competes in the Bantamweight division of Rizin Fighting Federation. Throughout his career, he notably claimed the 2016 Olympic silver medal at 59kg, the '19 World Championship at 63kg, the '18 Asian Games Gold medal at 60kg and three Asian Championship medals (champion in 2018 at 60 kg).

== Wrestling career ==
Ota began participating in major international and domestic wrestling tournaments while attending the Nippon Sport Science University. As a third-year student he won the Hungarian Wrestling Grand Prix, and as a fourth-year student he won the Emperor's Cup.

Ota took part in the 2016 Asian Olympic qualifier tournament, held between March 18–20, 2021, competing in the 59 kg Greco Roman event. He was scheduled to face the six-time world champion and 2012 Olympic gold medalist Hamid Sourian in the opening round. Despite coming into the match as a significant underdog, Ota pulled off an upset victory, beating Sourian 7–4 on points. Ota would furthermore beat Phils Tuktaev in the quarterfinals and Kim Seung-Hak in the semifinals, before losing to Wang Lumin in the finals. Despite this loss, he won the right to participate in the Olympic Games.

Ota was scheduled to fight a rematch with Hamid Sourian in the opening round of the 2016 Olympic games. Despite losing 4-0 by the end of the first half of the match, Ota mounted a comeback in the second half, winning by 6–5 on points. He beat Almat Kebispayev 6–0 in the next round, Stig-André Berge 4–0 in the quarterfinals and Rovshan Bayramov in the semifinals, which guaranteed him the silver medal. Ota faced the Cuban Ismael Borrero in the final match, and lost by technical fall.

Ota won the 2018 Asian Games 60 kg Greco-Roman event.

Ota participated in the 2019 All-Japan Selection Championship for the 2020 Olympic Games, taking part in the 60 kg Greco-Roman event. He lost to the 2019 World Championship winner Kenichiro Fumita 1–4 in the finals. As this rendered him unable to participate in the Olympic Games, Ota opted to take part in the 67 kg Greco-Roman event as well. He lost the very first match.

== Mixed martial arts career ==
Following his retirement from wrestling competition, he signed with Rizin Fighting Federation. Tokoro made his professional debut against Hideo Tokoro at Rizin 26 on December 31, 2020. He lost the fight by a second-round armbar.

Ota faced the former K-1 Welterweight champion Yuta Kubo at Rizin 30 on September 19, 2021. He won the fight by unanimous decision.

Ota faced 46-fight veteran Kazuma Sone at Rizin 33 - Saitama on December 31, 2021. He won the fight by a second-round technical knockout.

Ota faced the former DEEP bantamweight champion Yuki Motoya at Rizin 37 - Saitama on July 31, 2022. He lost the fight by unanimous decision.

Ota faced Kazuma Kuramoto at Rizin Landmark 5 on April 29, 2023. He knocked Kuramoto out just 27 seconds into the opening round.

Ota faced Kenta Takizawa at Super Rizin 2 on July 30, 2023, winning the fight by a first-round knockout at the end of the round.

Ota faced Shoko Sato at Rizin Landmark 6 on October 1, 2023, losing the fight by split decision.

Ota faced Ryusei Ashizawa on December 31, 2023 at Rizin 45, knocking him out in the first round.

Ota faced Juntaro Ushiku at Rizin 46 on April 29, 2024. He won the fight by unanimous decision.

Ota was scheduled to face Francesco Nuzzi, replacing Brian Moore on June 22, 2024, at Bellator Champions Series 3. However, Nuzzi was replaced by Blanque; Ota won the bout by a north-south choke submission in the first round.

Ota faced Yuki Motoya at Rizin 48 on September 29, 2024, and lost the bout via submission in the third round.

Ota faced Danny Sabatello at Rizin: Otoko Matsuri on May 4, 2025. He lost the fight by a third-round knockout.

== Mixed martial arts record ==
Professional record breakdown
15 matches	8 wins	7 losses
By knockout	4	2
By submission	2	3
By decision	2	2

Res.	Record	Opponent	Method	Event	Date	Round	Time	Location	Notes
Loss	8–7	Jinnosuke Kashimura	Submission (Ezekiel choke)	Rizin 55	November 8, 2026	3	1:51	Funabashi, Japan	
Loss	8–6	Yrysbek Tilenov	TKO (knees)	Rizin Landmark 15	July 18, 2026	2	3:04	Hiroshima, Japan	
Win	8–5	Yuto Hokamura	Submission (arm-triangle choke)	Rizin 53	May 10, 2026	2	4:25	Kobe, Japan	
Loss	7–5	Danny Sabatello	KO (punches)	Rizin: Otoko Matsuri	May 4, 2025	3	0:20	Tokyo, Japan	
Loss	7–4	Yuki Motoya	Submission (rear-naked choke)	Rizin 48	September 29, 2024	3	4:09	Saitama, Japan	
Win	7–3	Roger Blanque	Submission (north-south choke)	Bellator Champions Series 3	June 22, 2024	1	2:18	Dublin, Ireland	
Win	6–3	Juntaro Ushiku	Decision (unanimous)	Rizin 46	April 29, 2024	3	5:00	Tokyo, Japan	
Win	5–3	Ryusei Ashizawa	KO (punches)	Rizin 45	December 31, 2023	1	2:21	Saitama, Japan	
Loss	4–3	Shoko Sato	Decision (split)	Rizin Landmark 6	October 1, 2023	3	5:00	Nagoya, Japan	Catchweight (139 lb) bout.
Win	4–2	Kenta Takizawa	TKO (punches)	Super Rizin 2	July 30, 2023	1	4:34	Saitama, Japan	
Win	3–2	Kazuma Kuramoto	KO (punch)	Rizin Landmark 5	April 29, 2023	1	0:27	Tokyo, Japan	
Loss	2–2	Yuki Motoya	Decision (unanimous)	Rizin 37	July 31, 2022	3	5:00	Saitama, Japan	
Win	2–1	Kazuma Sone	TKO (soccer kicks and stomps)	Rizin 33	December 31, 2021	2	3:55	Saitama, Japan	Return to Bantamweight.
Win	1–1	Yuta Kubo	Decision (unanimous)	Rizin 30	September 19, 2021	3	5:00	Saitama, Japan	Featherweight debut.
Loss	0–1	Hideo Tokoro	Submission (armbar)	Rizin 26	December 31, 2020	2	2:23	Saitama, Japan	Bantamweight debut.

== See also ==
- List of male mixed martial artists
