= Minato =

Minato (港 or 湊) is Japanese for 'harbor', and may refer to:

== Places ==
- Minato (湊), a neighbourhood in Chūō or Chūō City, a special ward in Tokyo, Japan
- Minato Bridge, a 1974 double-deck cantilever truss bridge in Osaka, Japan
- Minato Castle, Japanese castle in what is now Tsuchizaki Minato
- Minato Kuyakusho Station, an underground railway station
- Minato Line, a Japanese railway line between Katsuta and Ajigaura
- Minato Mirai 21, the central business district of Yokohama
- Minato Motomachi Station, a train station in Chūō-ku
- Minato School, Japanese weekend school in San Diego, California
- Minato Station, a train station in Sakai-ku, Osaka Prefecture, Japan
- Minato Ward (disambiguation)
  - Minato, Tokyo or Minato City, a special ward in Tokyo, Japan
  - Minato-ku, Nagoya, a ward of Nagoya, Japan
  - Minato-ku, Osaka, a ward of Osaka, Japan

== People ==
Name

- Minato Matsui (松井 奏; born 2000), Japanese actor and singer
- Wakamotoharu Minato (若元春 港; born 1993), Japanese professional sumo wrestler
- Minato Oike (born 1996), Japanese BMX freestyle cyclist

Surname

- Chihiro Minato (born 1960), Japanese photographer
- Eikichi Minato (湊 栄吉; 1894–1978), Japanese politician
- Kanae Minato (born 1973), Japanese murder-mystery novelist
- Nicolò Minato (c. 1627–1698), Italian poet, librettist and impresario
- Rafa Minato (born 1996), Brazilian politician
- Yoshio Minato (湊 義雄; born 1949), Japanese rower
- Yūsuke Minato (born 1985), Japanese Nordic combined skier
- Minatofuji Takayuki (born 1968), sumo wrestler now known as Minato Oyakata

== Fictional characters ==
- Minato Aqua, former Hololive Production virtual YouTuber
- Minato Arisato, the protagonist's name in the Persona 3 manga adaptation
- Minato Kiyomizu, the main protagonist of the anime series Re-Main
- Minato Nagase, a character in the visual novel Akaneiro ni Somaru Saka
- Minato Namikaze, a character in the manga and anime series Naruto
- Minato Narumiya, the main protagonist of the light novel series Tsurune
- Minato Sahashi, the main protagonist of the manga series Sekirei
- Minato, a character in Dead or Alive 6 Last Round
- Fuwa Minato, one of Nijisanji's virtual YouTubers

== Other uses ==
- Minato, a double espresso coffee with milk; see Milk coffee#Minato
- Minato Shimbun, a Japanese newspaper
- Minato stable, a stable of sumo wrestlers

== See also ==
- Minato's Laundromat Japanese manga series
- Minato-kai, original name of the Japanese crime syndicate Sumiyoshi-kai
  - 港区 (disambiguation), the equivalent in CJKV
