= Fighting TV Samurai =

Fighting TV Samurai FIGHTING TV サムライ
- Country: Japan
- Broadcast area: Japan
- Headquarters: Minato, Tokyo, Japan

Programming
- Language: Japanese
- Picture format: 1080p HD

Ownership
- Owner: SKY Perfect JSAT Corporation

History
- Launched: December 1, 1996

Links
- Website: www.samurai-tv.com

Fighting TV Samurai (FIGHTING TV サムライ) also referred to as Samurai TV is a professional wrestling and combat sports channel owned by the SKY Perfect JSAT Corporation.

== History ==
Following test broadcasts in September 1996, the Fighting TV Samurai channel officially launched on December 1, 1996. From 2007 to 2023, Fighting TV Samurai broadcast the Japan Indie Awards, an annual professional wrestling awards show in which fans could vote on which wrestler, stable, or tag team to be the winners of each category. Past winners included Choun Shiryu, Mr. Pogo, Kazuki Hirata, Kota Ibushi, The Great Sasuke, Masashi Takeda, Masashi Takeda, Drew Parker, and Hideki Suzuki. On July 1, 2015, Fighting TV Samurai On Demand launched on the SKY PerfecTV! On Demand service. On October 15, 2020, Fighting TV Samurai aired the first Gleat event titled GLEAT Ver. 0.

== Current programming ==
=== Professional wrestling ===
- Active Advance Pro Wrestling
- All Japan Pro Wrestling
- Big Japan Pro Wrestling
- Ice Ribbon
- International Wrestling Association of Japan
- Ladies Legend Pro-Wrestling
- New Japan Pro-Wrestling
- Pro Wrestling Freedoms
- Strong Style Pro-Wrestling
- World Wonder Ring Stardom

== Former Programming ==
=== Professional wrestling ===
- Apache Pro-Wrestling Army
- Arison/Major Girl's Fighting AtoZ (2000-2004)
- Battlarts (1997-2011)
- Consejo Mundial de Lucha Libre (1997-2000; Fantastica Mania shows have been aired as a co-production with New Japan Pro-Wrestling since 2011)
- DDT Pro-Wrestling (2000-2023; Moved to Wrestle Universe and Abema TV)
- Diamond Ring (2007-2014)
- Frontier Martial-Arts Wrestling (1996-2002, 2024)
- GLEAT (2020)
- HUSTLE (2004-2010)
- IWA Japan
- JWP Joshi Puroresu (1998-2017)
- Michinoku Pro Wrestling (2001-2025)
- NEO Japan Ladies Pro-Wrestling (1998-2011)
- Onita Pro Wrestling
- Pro Wrestling NOAH (2000-2020; Moved to Wrestle Universe and Abema TV)
- Pro Wrestling Zero1 (2001-2024, 2026)
- Tokyo Joshi Pro-Wrestling (2020-2021)
- Wrestle-1

=== Combat sports ===
- Rizin Fighting Federation
