= 2023 in Rizin Fighting Federation =

Information
- First date: April 1, 2023
- Last date: December 31, 2023

Events
- Total events: 9

Fights
- Total fights: 117
- Title fights: 7

Chronology
2022 in Rizin Fighting Federation	2023 in Rizin Fighting Federation	2024 in Rizin Fighting Federation

The year 2023 was the ninth year in the history of the Rizin Fighting Federation, a mixed martial arts promotion based in Japan.

== List of events ==
Rizin Fighting Federation
#	Event	Date	Venue	Location	Attendance
1	Rizin 41 – Osaka	April 1, 2023	Maruzen Intec Arena	Osaka, Japan	9,987
2	Rizin Landmark 5	April 29, 2023	Yoyogi National Gymnasium	Tokyo, Japan	13,837
3	Rizin 42	May 6, 2023	Ariake Arena	Tokyo, Japan	14,930
4	Rizin 43 – Sapporo	June 24, 2023	Makomanai Ice Arena	Sapporo, Japan	8,510
5	Super Rizin 2: Rizin X Bellator	July 30, 2023	Saitama Super Arena	Saitama, Japan	24,264
6	Rizin 44	September 24, 2023	Saitama Super Arena	Saitama, Japan	11,681
7	Rizin Landmark 6	October 1, 2023	Dolphins Arena	Nagoya, Japan	7,017
8	Rizin Landmark 7	November 4, 2023	National Gymnastics Arena	Baku, Azerbaijan	
9	Rizin 45	December 31, 2023	Saitama Super Arena	Saitama, Japan	23,013

== Title fights ==
Title fights in 2023
Weight class				Method	Round	Time	Event	Notes
Featherweight	Kleber Koike Erbst	vs.	Chihiro Suzuki	No Contest (missed weight)	1	2:59	Rizin 43	(Note: For the vacant Rizin Featherweight Championship (as Koike missed weight and was stripped of the title, only Suzuki was eligible). Originally a Submission (armbar) win for Koike; overturned due to Koike missing weight.)
Super Atomweight	Seika Izawa (c)	def.	Claire Lopez	Submission (ninja choke)	1	1:04	Super Rizin 2	(Note: For the Rizin Super Atomweight Championship.)
Bantamweight	Juan Archuleta	def.	Hiromasa Ougikubo	Decision (unanimous)	3	5:00	Super Rizin 2	(Note: For the vacant Rizin Bantamweight Championship.)
Featherweight	Vugar Karamov	def.	Mikuru Asakura	Submission (rear-naked choke)	1	2:41	Super Rizin 2	(Note: For the vacant Rizin Featherweight Championship.)
Featherweight	Chihiro Suzuki	def.	Vugar Karamov (c)	KO (upkick and punches)	1	1:28	Rizin Landmark 7	(Note: For the Rizin Featherweight Championship.)
Bantamweight	Kai Asakura	def.	Juan Archuleta	TKO (knee to the body and punches)	2	3:20	Rizin 45	(Note: For the vacant Rizin Bantamweight Championship (as Archuleta missed weight and was stripped the title, only Asakura was eligible).)
Flyweight	Kyoji Horiguchi	def.	Makoto Takahashi	Submission (rear-naked choke)	2	3:44	Rizin 45	(Note: For the inaugural Rizin Flyweight Championship.)

== Rizin 41 – Osaka ==
Rizin 41 – Osaka
- Promotion: Rizin Fighting Federation
- Date: April 1, 2023
- Venue: Maruzen Intec Arena
- City: Osaka, Japan
- Attendance: 9,987

Rizin 41 – Osaka was a Combat sport event held by Rizin Fighting Federation on April 1, 2023, at the Maruzen Intec Arena in Osaka, Japan.

=== Background ===
A bantamweight kickboxing bout between Ryusei Ashizawa and the one-time K-1 super featherweight title challenger Kouzi was scheduled as the event headliner.

=== Results ===
Rizin 41
Weight Class				Method	Round	T.Time	Notes
Bantamweight 61 kg	(Japan) Ryusei Ashizawa	def.	(Japan) Kouzi	Decision (Split)	3	3:00	Kickboxing rules
Featherweight 66 kg	(Azerbaijan) Vugar Karamov	def.	(Japan) Yoshinori Horie	Submission (Rear-Naked Choke)	2	3:21	
Welterweight 77 kg	(Japan) Keita Nakamura	def.	(Japan) Kiichi Kunimoto	KO (Punches and Soccer Kick)	2	0:49	
Flyweight 57 kg	(Japan) Makoto Takahashi	def.	(Japan) Daichi Kitakata	Technical Submission (Arm-Triangle Choke)	2	1:17	
Intermission
Featherweight 66 kg	(Japan) Kyohei Hagiwara	def.	(Guam) Kyle Aguon	Decision (Unanimous)	3	5:00	
Bantamweight 61 kg	(Japan) Koichi Ishizuka	def.	(Japan) Yuto Hokamura	Decision (Split)	3	5:00	
Lightweight 71 kg	(South Korea) Kim Kyung-pyo	def.	(Japan) Sho Patrick Usami	Submission (Rear-Naked Choke)	1	3:33	
Flyweight 57 kg	(Azerbaijan) Mehman Mamedov	def.	(Japan) Yusaku Nakamura	KO (Punches)	1	0:23	
Bantamweight 61 kg	(Japan) Shun Onishi	def.	(Japan) Motoki	KO (Punch)	1	1:37	Kickboxing rules
Catchweight 66,5 kg	(Japan) Sota Kimura	def.	(Japan) Shingeki no Yuuki	TKO (Body Punch)	3	1:32	Kickboxing rules
Opening Bouts
Catchweight 57,5 kg	(Japan) Asataro	def.	(Japan) Shin Sakurai	Decision (Unanimous)	3	3:00	Kickboxing rules
Catchweight 57,5 kg	(Japan) Daichi Akahira	def.	(Japan) Yuto Miwa	KO (Right straight)	1	2:47	Kickboxing rules

== Rizin Landmark 5 ==
Rizin Landmark 5
- Promotion: Rizin Fighting Federation
- Date: April 29, 2023
- Venue: Yoyogi National Gymnasium
- City: Tokyo, Japan
- Attendance: 13,837

Rizin Landmark 5 was a Combat sport event held by Rizin Fighting Federation on April 29, 2023, at the Yoyogi National Gymnasium in Tokyo, Japan.

=== Background ===
A featherweight bout between the former Rizin featherweight champion Juntaro Ushiku and Mikuru Asakura served as the event headliner, while a featherweight bout between another former Rizin featherweight champion Yutaka Saito and Ren Hiramoto was booked as the co-main event.

=== Results ===
Rizin Landmark 5
Weight Class				Method	Round	T.Time	Notes
Featherweight 66 kg	(Japan) Mikuru Asakura	def.	(Japan) Juntaro Ushiku	Decision (Unanimous)	3	5:00	
Featherweight 66 kg	(Japan) Yutaka Saito	def.	(Japan) Ren Hiramoto	Decision (Split)	3	5:00	
Bantamweight 61 kg	(Japan) Shinobu Ota	def.	(Japan) Kazuma Kuramoto	KO (Punch)	1	0:27	
Intermission
Lightweight 71 kg	(Brazil) Luiz Gustavo	def.	(Japan) Koji Takeda	Decision (Split)	3	5:00	
W.Super Atomweight 49 kg	(Japan) Kanna Asakura	def.	(Japan) Mei Yamaguchi	Decision (Unanimous)	3	5:00	
W.Catchweight 51 kg	(France) Claire Lopez	def.	(Japan) Rena Kubota	Submission (Kneebar)	3	4:21	
Heavyweight 120 kg	(Japan) Tsuyoshi Sudario	def.	(Guam) Roque Martinez	Decision (Unanimous)	3	5:00	
Featherweight 66 kg	(Japan) Masanori Kanehara	def.	(Japan) Sora Yamamoto	Decision (Unanimous)	3	5:00	
Lightweight 71 kg	(Russia) Ali Abdulkhalikov	def.	(Japan) Tatsuya Saika	KO (Punch)	1	3:30	

== Rizin 42 ==
Rizin 42
- Promotion: Rizin Fighting Federation
- Date: May 6, 2023
- Venue: Ariake Arena
- City: Tokyo, Japan
- Attendance: 14,930

Rizin 42 was a Combat sport event held by Rizin Fighting Federation on May 6, 2023, at the Ariake Arena in Tokyo, Japan.

=== Background ===
A bantamweight bout between Yuki Motoya and the former Rizin Bantamweight champion Kai Asakura was booked as the event headliner.

=== Results ===
Rizin 42
Weight Class				Method	Round	T.Time	Notes
Bantamweight 61 kg	(Japan) Kai Asakura	def.	(Japan) Yuki Motoya	KO (Knee to the Body)	3	2:25	
Bantamweight 61 kg	(United States) Juan Archuleta	def.	(Japan) Naoki Inoue	Decision (Unanimous)	3	5:00	
Lightweight 71 kg	(Brazil) Roberto Satoshi Souza (c)	def.	(United States) Spike Carlyle	Decision (Unanimous)	3	5:00	Non-title bout.
Catchweight 70 kg	(Thailand) Buakaw Banchamek	draw.	(Japan) Rukiya Anpo	Decision (Unanimous)	3	3:00	Kickboxing rules
Intermission
Featherweight 66 kg	(Japan) YA-MAN	def.	(Japan) Kota Miura	KO (Knee and Punches)	1	3:13	Special rules
Flyweight 57 kg	(United States) John Dodson	def.	(Japan) Tatsuki Saomoto	Decision (Unanimous)	3	5:00	
Featherweight 66 kg	(Japan) Kazumasa Majima	def.	(Japan) Takahiro Ashida	Technical Submission (Shoulder Choke)	1	4:43	
Featherweight 66 kg	(Japan) Ulka Sasaki	def.	(South Africa) Boyd Allen	Decision (Unanimous)	3	5:00	
Lightweight 71 kg	(Russia) Viktor Kolesnik	def.	(Japan) Atsushi Kishimoto	TKO (Leg Kick)	2	2:57	
Flyweight 57 kg	(Japan) Erson Yamamoto	def.	(Japan) Yuki Ito	Decision (Unanimous)	3	5:00	
Featherweight 66 kg	(Japan) Takeji Yokoyama	def.	(Japan) Takuya Yamamoto	Submission (Armbar)	1	1:24	
Flyweight 57 kg	(Uzbekistan) Ramazan Temirov	def.	(Japan) Yuta Hamamoto	TKO (Punches)	1	4:06	
Catchweight 69 kg	(Japan) Sota Kimura	def.	(Japan) Yasuhiro Kido	Decision (Unanimous)	3	3:00	Kickboxing rules

== Rizin 43 – Sapporo ==
Rizin 43 – Sapporo
- Promotion: Rizin Fighting Federation
- Date: June 24, 2023
- Venue: Makomanai Ice Arena
- City: Sapporo, Japan
- Attendance: 8,510

Rizin 43 – Sapporo was a Combat sport event held by Rizin Fighting Federation on June 24, 2023, at the Makomanai Ice Arena in Sapporo, Japan.

=== Background ===
A Rizin Featherweight Championship bout between Kleber Koike Erbst and Chihiro Suzuki headlined the event. At the weigh-ins, Koike weighed in at 145.88 pounds, 0.88 pounds over the title limit. As a result, upon commencement of the fight, Koike was stripped of the title and only Suzuki is eligible to win it.

=== Results ===
Main card
Weight class				Method	Round	Time	Notes
Featherweight	Kleber Koike Erbst	vs.	Chihiro Suzuki	No Contest (missed weight)	1	2:59	(Note: For the vacant Rizin Featherweight Championship (as Koike missed weight and was stripped of the title, only Suzuki was eligible). Originally a Submission (armbar) win for Koike; overturned due to Koike missing weight.)
Lightweight	Yusuke Yachi	def.	Zach Zane	Submission (rear-naked choke)	1	2:50
Heavyweight	Mikio Ueda	def.	Hideki Sekine	TKO (punches and head kick)	1	0:22
Featherweight	Hiroaki Suzuki	def.	Taisei Nishitani	TKO (punches)	1	0:56
Catchweight (62.5 kg)	Hiroki Suzuki	def.	Genji Umeno	KO (flying knee)	2	2:43	(Note: Kickboxing rules)
Intermission
Catchweight (73 kg)	Minoru Kimura	def.	Daryl Lokoku	KO (punch)	1	1:08	(Note: Kickboxing rules)
Featherweight	Yuta Kubo	def.	Karate Kinoshita	Decision (split)	3	5:00
Women's Strawweight	Saori Oshima	def.	Haruka Hasegawa	Submission (scarf hold armlock)	1	1:16
Featherweight	Suguru Nii	def.	Tateo Iida	KO (punches)	1	2:32
Featherweight	Tetsuya Seki	def.	Raiki Endo	Decision (unanimous)	3	5:00
Bantamweight	Joji Goto	def.	Trent Girdham	Submission (twister)	2	2:34
Women's Bantamweight	Aoi Kuriyama	def.	Marina Kumagai	KO (punch)	1	2:48
Catchweight (57.5 kg)	Kensei Yamakawa	def.	Ryoga Hirano	TKO (three knockdowns)	2	1:22	(Note: Kickboxing rules)
Opening bouts
Lightweight	Toshiki Watanabe	def.	Kento Azumi	Submission (kneebar)	1	1:07	(Note: Special rules)
Catchweight (55 kg)	Suguru Hayasaka	def.	Daiki Maruyama	Technical Submission (arm-triangle choke)	1	3:33	(Note: Special rules)
Catchweight (61.5 kg)	Aito Tanimura	def.	Ryuya Koide	KO (punch)	1	0:55	(Note: Kickboxing rules)
Catchweight (58 kg)	Shoki Hoshikubo	vs.	Kazuyuki Furukawa	No Contest (missed weight)	3	3:00	(Note: Kickboxing rules. Originally a Decision (unanimous) win for Hoshikubo; overturned due to missed weight.)

== Super Rizin 2: Rizin X Bellator ==
Super Rizin.2: Rizin X Bellator
- Promotion: Rizin Fighting Federation; Bellator MMA
- Date: July 30, 2023
- Venue: Saitama Super Arena
- City: Saitama, Japan
- Attendance: 24,264

Super Rizin 2: Rizin X Bellator was a Combat sport event held by Rizin Fighting Federation and Bellator MMA on July 30, 2023 at the Saitama Super Arena in Japan.

As with the previous Super Rizin & Rizin 38 and Rizin 40 & Rizin vs Bellator events in 2022, Super Rizin 2 was split between two cards. Matches on the Bellator card were fought inside a cage, while Super Rizin 2 took place in the traditional ring.

Outside of Japan, the Bellator card aired live on Showtime in the United States, while Super Rizin 2 was distributed via PPV on FITE.

=== Background ===
The event was originally supposed to be headlined by a Rizin Bantamweight Championship bout between former champion Kai Asakura and former Bellator MMA Bantamweight champion Juan Archuleta. On July 18, 2023 it was announced that Asakura withdrew from the event and would be replaced by Hiromasa Ougikubo.

=== Results ===
Part 2: Super Rizin 2
Weight Class				Method	Round	T.Time	Notes
Featherweight 66 kg	(Azerbaijan) Vugar Karamov	def.	(Japan) Mikuru Asakura	Submission (rear-naked choke)	1	2:41	For the vacant Rizin Featherweight Championship.
Bantamweight 61 kg	(United States) Juan Archuleta	def.	(Japan) Hiromasa Ougikubo	Decision (unanimous)	3	5:00	For the vacant Rizin Bantamweight Championship.
W.Super Atomweight 49 kg	(Japan) Seika Izawa (c)	def.	(France) Claire Lopez	Submission (ninja choke)	1	1:04	For the Rizin Women's Super Atomweight Championship.
Intermission
Catchweight 70 kg	(Japan) Chihiro Suzuki	def.	(Brazil) Patrício Pitbull	KO (punch)	1	2:32	
Lightweight 71 kg	(Azerbaijan) Tofiq Musayev	def.	(Japan) Akira Okada	KO (punches)	2	1:11	
Bantamweight 61 kg	(Japan) Shinobu Ota	def.	(Japan) Kenta Takizawa	TKO (punches)	1	4:54	
Middleweight 84 kg	(Brazil) Igor Tanabe	def.	(Japan) Daichi Abe	Submission (heel hook)	1	4:34	
Catchweight 58 kg	(Japan) Yuki Ito	def.	(Japan) Hiroya Kondo	Decision (split)	3	5:00	
Part 1: Bellator MMA x Rizin 2
Lightweight	(Brazil) Patricky Pitbull	def.	(Brazil) Roberto Satoshi Souza	TKO (leg kick)	3	0:49	Bellator Lightweight World Grand Prix Quarter-Final bout.
Flyweight	(Japan) Kyoji Horiguchi	vs.	(Japan) Makoto Takahashi	No Contest (accidental eye poke)	1	0:25	For the inaugural Bellator Flyweight World Championship.
Women's Flyweight	(Japan) Kana Watanabe	def.	(United States) Veta Arteaga	Decision (unanimous)	3	5:00	
Bantamweight	(Russia) Magomed Magomedov	def.	(United States) Danny Sabatello	Submission (guillotine choke)	1	3:55	
Welterweight	(Russia) Andrey Koreshkov	def.	(United States) Lorenz Larkin	Decision (split)	3	5:00	

== Rizin 44 ==
Rizin 44
- Promotion: Rizin Fighting Federation
- Date: September 24, 2023
- Venue: Saitama Super Arena
- City: Saitama, Japan
- Attendance: 11,681

Rizin 44 was a combat sport event held by Rizin Fighting Federation on September 24, 2023 at the Saitama Super Arena in Tokyo, Japan.

=== Background ===
A featherweight bout between former champion Kleber Koike Erbst (also former KSW Featherweight champion) and former Sengoku Featherweight champion Masanori Kanehara was scheduled to headline the event.

A heavyweight bout between former sumo wrestler Tsuyoshi Sudario and UFC veteran Todd Duffee was expected to take place at the event. However, Duffee withdrew from the fight due to a problem with his passport.

=== Results ===
Rizin 44
Weight Class				Method	Round	T.Time	Notes
Featherweight 66 kg	(Japan) Masanori Kanehara	def.	(Brazil) Kleber Koike Erbst	Decision (Unanimous)	3	5:00	
Featherweight 66 kg	(Japan) Juntaro Ushiku	def.	(Japan) Kyohei Hagiwara	Decision (Unanimous)	3	5:00	
Lightweight 71 kg	(Japan) Yoshinori Horie	def.	(United States) Spike Carlyle	Decision (Unanimous)	3	5:00	
Intermission
Catchweight 70 kg	(Japan) Rukiya Anpo	def.	(Japan) Sho Patrick Usami	Decision (Unanimous) (29–27, 29–26, 29–26)	3	3:00	Kickboxing rules.
Featherweight 66 kg	(Japan) Yoshiki Nakahara	def.	(Japan) Rikuto Shirakawa	Decision (Unanimous)	3	5:00	
Catchweight 66,2 kg	(Japan) Kazumasa Majima	def.	(Japan) Takeji Yokoyama	Decision (Unanimous)	3	5:00	Originally 66kg, Majima missed weight.
Flyweight 57 kg	(Japan) Ryuya Fukuda	def.	(Japan) Erson Yamamoto	TKO (Doctor Stoppage)	3	1:37	
Bantamweight 61 kg	(Japan) Taichi Nakajima	def.	(Japan) Ryo Okada	Decision (Unanimous)	3	5:00	
Heavyweight 120 kg	(Japan) Shoma Shibisai	def.	(Romania) Janos Csukas	Submission (Heel Hook)	1	2:27	
Flyweight 57 kg	(Uzbekistan) Ramazan Temirov	def.	(Japan) Takaki Soya	KO (Punches)	1	3:15	

== Rizin Landmark 6 ==
Rizin Landmark 6
- Promotion: Rizin Fighting Federation
- Date: October 1, 2023
- Venue: Dolphins Arena
- City: Nagoya, Japan
- Attendance: 7,017

Rizin Landmark 6 was a Combat sport event held by Rizin Fighting Federation on October 1, 2023 at the Dolphins Arena in Nagoya, Japan.

=== Background ===
A bantamweight bout between Dream Japanese Bantamweight Grand Prix 2011 winner Hideo Tokoro and Alan "Hiro" Yamaniha was scheduled to headline the event.

=== Results ===
Rizin Landmark 6
Weight Class				Method	Round	T.Time	Notes
Bantamweight 61 kg	(Brazil) Alan Yamaniha	def.	(Japan) Hideo Tokoro	Decision (Unanimous)	3	5:00	
Catchweight 63 kg	(Japan) Shoko Sato	def.	(Japan) Shinobu Ota	Decision (Split)	3	5:00	
Heavyweight 120 kg	(Japan) Tsuyoshi Sudario	def.	(South Korea) Lim Dong-hwan	TKO (Punches)	3	2:10	
Flyweight 57 kg	(Japan) Yuki Ito	def.	(Thailand) Topnoi Kiwram	Decision (Split)	3	5:00	
Catchweight 61,5 kg	(Japan) Genji Umeno	def.	(Japan) Yuto Saito	Decision (Majority)	3	3:00	Kickboxing rules.
Intermission
Catchweight 58 kg	(Japan) Yusaku Nakamura	def.	(Japan) Hiroya Kondo	Decision (Split)	3	5:00	
Middleweight 84 kg	(Brazil) Igor Tanabe	def.	(Japan) Animal☆Koji	Submission (Triangle Choke)	1	3:40	
Women's Strawweight 52,5 kg	(Japan) Machi Fukuda	def.	(Japan) Ayaka Watanabe	Decision (Split)	3	5:00	
Heavyweight 120 kg	(Japan) Hidetaka Arato	def.	(Japan) Takakenshin	TKO (Punches)	2	4:49	
Flyweight 57 kg	(Brazil) Rogério Bontorin	def.	(Japan) Yutaro Muramoto	Decision (Unanimous)	3	5:00	
Featherweight 66 kg	(Russia) Viktor Kolesnik	def.	(Japan) Ryo Takagi	Decision (Unanimous)	3	5:00	
Lightweight 71 kg	(Japan) Yusaku Inoue	def.	(Japan) Kohei Tokeshi	TKO (Flying Knee and Punches)	1	1:11	
Bantamweight 61 kg	(Japan) Joji Goto	def.	(Japan) Junya Hibino	Submission (Twister)	2	2:00	
Opening Bouts
Catchweight 68 kg	(Japan) Shogo Ota	def.	(Japan) Ginji Hara	Submission (armbar)	1	1:52	
Flyweight 57 kg	(Japan) Genki Takeno	def.	(Japan) Ryota Naito	Decision (Unanimous)	3	3:00	Kickboxing rules.
Bantamweight 61 kg	(Japan) Ryuki Kirishima	def.	(Japan) Masanari Yamada	Decision (Unanimous)	2	5:00	

== Rizin Landmark 7 ==
Rizin Landmark 7
- Promotion: Rizin Fighting Federation
- Date: November 4, 2023
- Venue: National Gymnastics Arena
- City: Baku, Azerbaijan

Rizin Landmark 7 was a combat sport event held by Rizin Fighting Federation on November 4, 2023 at the National Gymnastics Arena in Baku, Azerbaijan.

=== Background ===
Rizin Landmark 7 was the promotion's first international event, and the first major MMA event to take place in Azerbaijan.

A Rizin Featherweight Championship bout between reigning champion Vugar Karamov and challenger Chihiro Suzuki headlined the event.

A lightweight bout between Rizin Lightweight Grand Prix 2019 winner Tofiq Musayev and former Deep Lightweight champion Koji Takeda served as the co-main event.

Another lightweight bout between former AMC Fight Nights Lightweight champion Nariman Abbasov and Ali Abdulkhalikov took place at the event.

=== Results ===
Rizin Landmark 7
Weight Class				Method	Round	T.Time	Notes
Featherweight 66 kg	(Japan) Chihiro Suzuki	def.	(Azerbaijan) Vugar Karamov (c)	TKO (Upkick and Punches)	1	1:28	For the Rizin Featherweight Championship.
Lightweight 71 kg	(Azerbaijan) Tofiq Musayev	def.	(Japan) Koji Takeda	KO (Punches)	3	2:03	
Lightweight 71 kg	(Russia) Ali Abdulkhalikov	def.	(Azerbaijan) Nariman Abbasov	Decision (Unanimous)	3	5:00	
Catchweight 60 kg	(Azerbaijan) Mehman Mamedov	def.	(Turkey) Ferit Göktepe	Decision (Unanimous)	3	5:00	
Lightweight 71 kg	(South Korea) Kim Kyung-pyo	def.	(Azerbaijan) Tural Ragimov	TKO (Punches)	1	0:21	
Intermission
Strawweight 51 kg	(Ukraine) Anastasiya Svetkivska	def.	(Kyrgyzstan) Farida Abdueva	Submission (Triangle Armbar)	2	4:20	
Featherweight 66 kg	(Uzbekistan) Ilkhom Nozimov	def.	(Cameroon) Jaures Dea	Decision (Unanimous)	3	5:00	
Lightweight 71 kg	(Ukraine) Vladyslav Rudnev	def.	(Kazakhstan) Iliyar Askhanov	Decision (Unanimous)	3	5:00	
Heavyweight 120 kg	(Georgia (country)) Shota Betlemidze	def.	(Portugal) Quentin Domingos	TKO (Retirement)	1	5:00	
Light Heavyweight 93 kg	(Latvia) Hasan Mezhiev	def.	(Kazakhstan) Konstantin Merkulov	Submission (Rear-Naked Choke)	1	2:32	

== Rizin 45 ==
Rizin 45
- Promotion: Rizin Fighting Federation
- Date: December 31, 2023
- Venue: Saitama Super Arena
- City: Saitama, Japan
- Attendance: 23,013

Rizin 45 was a combat sport event held by Rizin Fighting Federation on December 31, 2023, at the Saitama Super Arena in Saitama, Japan.

=== Background ===
A rematch for the inaugural Rizin Flyweight Championship between former Rizin and Bellator Bantamweight Champion Kyoji Horiguchi and current Deep Flyweight champion (also former Cage Fury FC Flyweight champion) Makoto Takahashi headlined the event. The pairing previously met at Super Rizin 2 in July 2023, where the bout was declared a no contest after Horiguchi accidentally poked Takahashi in the eye.

A Rizin Bantamweight Championship bout between then champion Juan Archuleta and former champion Kai Asakura served as the co-main event. At the weigh-ins, Archuleta weighed in at 140.65 pounds, 5.65 pounds over the limit. As a result, Archuleta was stripped of the title and only Asakura will be eligible to win it.

In the featherweight division, a clash between two former champions should took place at the event when Kleber Koike Erbst meets Yutaka Saito.

A flyweight bout between 2021 Rizin Bantamweight Grand Prix winner Hiromasa Ougikubo and current BKFC Flyweight champion John Dodson took place at the event.

A 155-pound catchweight kickboxing bout between former K-1 Super Lightweight champion Rukiya Anpo and former K-1 Super Welterweight champion Minoru Kimura was expected to take place at the event. However, the fight was cancelled after Kimura tested positive for a banned substance once again. He was replaced by former K-1 Welterweight Champion Yuta Kubo in a MMA special rules bout.

=== Results ===
Rizin 45
Weight Class				Method	Round	T.Time	Notes
Flyweight 57 kg	(Japan) Kyoji Horiguchi	def.	(Japan) Makoto Takahashi	Submission (rear-naked choke)	2	3:44	For the inaugural Rizin Flyweight Championship.
Bantamweight 61 kg	(Japan) Kai Asakura	def.	(United States) Juan Archuleta	TKO (knee to the body and punches)	2	3:20	For the vacant Rizin Bantamweight Championship (as Archuleta missed weight and was stripped the title, only Asakura was eligible).
Featherweight 66 kg	(Brazil) Kleber Koike Erbst	def.	(Japan) Yutaka Saito	Technical Submission (brabo choke)	3	1:22	
Featherweight 66 kg	(Japan) Ren Hiramoto	def.	(Japan) YA-MAN	Decision (unanimous)	3	5:00	
Intermission
W.Super Atomweight 49 kg	(Japan) Seika Izawa	def.	(Japan) Miyuu Yamamoto	Submission (rear-naked choke)	2	0:37	Non-Title bout and Yamamoto retirement bout.
Heavyweight 120 kg	(Japan) Mikio Ueda	def.	(Japan) Tsuyoshi Sudario	TKO (knee and punches)	2	0:55	
Flyweight 57 kg	(Japan) Hiromasa Ougikubo	def.	(United States) John Dodson	Decision (unanimous)	3	5:00	
Bantamweight 61 kg	(United States) Vince Morales	def.	(Japan) Yuki Motoya	Decision (unanimous)	3	5:00	
Bantamweight 61 kg	(Japan) Shinobu Ota	def.	(Japan) Ryusei Ashizawa	KO (punches)	1	2:21	
Intermission
Catchweight 65 kg	(Japan) Kouzi	def.	(Japan) Kota Miura	TKO (punches and soccer kicks)	2	0:59	RIZIN MMA Special rules.
Welterweight 77 kg	(Brazil) Igor Tanabe	def.	(Japan) Shinsho Anzai	Technical Submission (rear-naked choke)	1	1:32	
Flyweight 57 kg	(Japan) Hiroya Kondo	def.	(Japan) Jo Arai	TKO (head kick and punches)	2	2:53	
Catchweight 70 kg	(Japan) Yuta Kubo	def.	(Japan) Rukiya Anpo	Submission (rear-naked choke)	1	4:28	RIZIN MMA Special rules.
Opening Bouts
Featherweight 66 kg	(Japan) Suguru Nii	def.	(Japan) Satoshi Yamasu	KO (punch)	2	1:03	
Catchweight 60 kg	(Japan) Tatsuki Shinotsuka	def.	(Japan) Daichi Tomizawa	Decision (unanimous)	3	3:00	Kickboxing rules.
Catchweight 54 kg	(Japan) Ryujin Nasukawa	def.	(South Korea) Shin Jong-min	TKO (punches)	1	2:16	
Bantamweight 61 kg	(Japan) Joe Hiramoto	def.	(Japan) Yushi	Decision (unanimous)	3	5:00	

== See also ==
- List of current Rizin FF fighters
- 2023 in UFC
- 2023 in Bellator MMA
- 2023 in ONE Championship
- 2023 in Professional Fighters League
- 2023 in Absolute Championship Akhmat
- 2023 in Konfrontacja Sztuk Walki
- 2023 in Legacy Fighting Alliance
- 2023 in Brave Combat Federation
- 2023 in Road FC
