= Blazing Fists =

- Theatrical release poster
- Blue Fight 〜蒼き若者たちのブレイキングダウン〜
- Directed by: Takashi Miike
- Based on: Street Legend by Mikuru Asakura
- Produced by: Mikuru Asakura (Executive Producer); Misako Saka; Shigeji Maeda
- Cinematography: Nobuyasu Kita
- Edited by: Naoichiro Sagara
- Music by: Kōji Endō
- Distributed by: GAGA; YOAKE FILM
- Release date: January 31, 2025 (Japan)
- Running time: 119 minutes
- Country: Japan
- Language: Japanese

Blazing Fists (Japanese: Blue Fight 〜蒼き若者たちのブレイキングダウン〜, Hepburn: Blue Fight ~Aoki Wakamono-tachi no Breaking Down~; lit. 'Blue Fight: Breaking Down of Blue Youths'), also known as Blue Fight: The Breaking Down of Young Blue Warriors, is a 2025 Japanese action film written by Shin Kibayashi and directed by Takashi Miike. The film is based on Street Legend, the autobiography of Mikuru Asakura. The film was released in the West under the title Blazing Fists.

== Plot ==
Ryōma Akai is sent to a juvenile detention center. There he meets Ikuto Yagura, a dangerous youth who saves him from an attack by a fellow resident. The two become best friends. Mixed martial artist Mikuru Asakura visits the center tells the youths about a mixed martial arts tournament he runs called Breaking Down. Upon their release, Ryōma and Ikuto tell their mothers their plan to participate in the tournament. Ikuto also visits his father, who is in an adult detention center fighting against being wrongfully accused of murdering an employee who actually committed suicide.

The two take employment as machinists. Ryōma worries about the return of the krishna biker gang, which includes Midō, a dangerous murderer. Meanwhile, Jun Kishōmaru and his high school gang threaten Ikuto. A café owner, a former yakuza in the same group with Jun's father, encourages Jun to take his fighting urges to the Hinotaka Fighting Gym, run by Takayuki Hino. Ryōma and Ikuto also go to train there, where Ryōma sees Yukina Tamaki, an influencer from his former high school. Jun and his gang enter the gym and threaten the two friends, but Mr. Hino encourages them to fight in the ring instead. Ryōma recognizes Jun's gang member Kosuke as a man who demanded 500,000 yen from him and caused him to rob a man at knifepoint, the crime for which Ikuto was accused and sent to the juvenile detention center. Ryōma chooses to face Kosuke in the ring and is knocked down, but Ikuto encourages him to get up, after which Ryōma knocks out Kosuke. After that, Ikuto uses the rope-a-dope tactic to defeat Jun in the ring.

Ryōma and Ikuto audition for Breaking Down, but only Ikuto is accepted. Jun makes up with Yukina, who says that they are not officially broken up, giving him hope. They are harassed by members of the Krishna gang, causing Jun to get into a fight in which he gets knocked out by a baseball bat and kidnapped. Kosuke tells Yukina and her friend Nami not to report the incident because Jun's fighting would cause him to be sent to juvie. Midō punishes the gang member who kidnapped Jun. Kosuke begs Ryōma and Ikuto for help. Ikuto is supposed to participate in the Breaking Down tournament, but his conscience will not let him abandon someone in need of help. Kosuke, Ryōma, and Ikuto enter the gang hideout, where they unexpectedly face over 60 gang members. The three are defeated, but then the rest of Jun's gang shows up to even the odds. Midō joins the fight and breaks Ikuto's right arm, then Ikuto fights back and knocks Midō out. After the two friends and Jun's gang leave, Midō stands up and reveals that he pretended to get knocked out because Ikuto reminded him of himself as a youth.

At the tournament, Ikuto is unable to fight and requests that Ryōma take his place. Mr. Asakura agrees, and Ryōma fights Joey, the son of the prosecutor who is railroading Ikuto's father into prison for a murder he did not commit. Before the fight, Ryōma admits to Ikuto that he was the one who committed the robbery for which Ikuto was sent to juvie. Ikuto says that he already knew it from Ryōma's eyes.

During the credits, a press conference announcing the acquittal of Ikuto's father. The mothers of Ryōma and Ikuto are shown celebrating. Ikuto and his dad are shown walking down the street together holding bags of snacks and drinks purchased from a convenience store.

== Cast ==
- Danhi Kinoshita as Ikuto Yagura
- Kaname Yoshizawa as Ryōma Akai
- Chikashi Kuon as Jun Kishōmaru
- Mikuru Asakura as himself
- Gackt as Shizuka Midō
- Wataru Ichinose as Toshikazu Hakamada
- Nobuaki Kaneko as Yujiro Osako
- Karuma as Abe Kenta a.k.a. Abeken
- Konatsu Kato as Yukina Tamaki
- On Nakano as Kosuke Isaka
- Shōki Nakayama as Take
- Shūzō Ōhira as Jōi "Joey" Sadoshima
- Mariko Shinoda as Haruka Yagura
- Katsunori Takahashi as Daisuke Yagura
- Miku Tanaka as Nanami Hayakawa
- Susumu Terajima as Takayuki Hino
- Anna Tsuchiya as Kaoruko Akai
- Kyōsuke Yabe as Instructor Harada
- Sēya as Shikemoku
- Riki Sanada as Ginji
- Takafumi Horie
- Akihiro Nishino
- Hiroyuki Miyasako
- Yuta Misaki
- Yuta Kajiwara
- Junji Ukita
- Tsutomu Takahashi
- Kazuki Namioka
- Takayuki Yamada as man in bear suit (uncredited cameo)

== Production ==
In an interview with Sara Merican of Deadline.com, Miike discussed his approach to making the film as well as his reaction to its reception. Miike stated, "I'm aware that I'm getting older and I often think about how many more films I can make in my life. Making a film, while it's not exactly like being an athlete, it's still very physically-intensive work. [...] My films have been known for their violence, but Blazing Fists is quite different. Maybe some audiences will expect more violence, so I was a little afraid of letting people down or disappointing them. However, by the end of the film's screening, it did look like people very much enjoyed the film, and that filled my heart with a warm feeling." Regarding the Japanese film industry Miike said, "The Japanese film industry is quite an insular society, partly because even when compared to South Korea, the Japanese population is 2.5 times larger than Korea's, which also means that we have a much larger domestic audience as well. The Japanese film industry and its filmmakers only focused on Japanese audiences because that was enough. But now, as the population is decreasing, along with new technologies and internet services like Netflix, a kind of new wave is coming. The Japanese film industry had to ask, 'What can we do?' We have to do something else and cannot keep doing things the same way, if not, we not we cannot survive. This is why there is an internationally-oriented group and new wave coming." Miike warned against pandering to international tastes, stating, "People who are thinking about what kinds of films or shows could be popular globally and then working from there — that kind of film is never successful. The important thing is to think about what you can truly make and what you want for the audience, in a spiritual way, before thinking about how many audiences you can bring there."

== Release ==
The film was released in Japan on January 31, 2025.

== Reception ==
The review on desdeabajo.com reads, "Miike is somehow more controlled and down to Earth, but still delivers a great story that is in parts a juvenile gang story, a redemption tale, and a sport drama. It manages to have not two, but three main characters and provides an engaging back story for all of them, that makes us root for them, even when at first, we were led to believe we had to dislike one of them. As expected, there are several fight scenes, both in the ring and on the streets, and the sequences are fierce, tense and when it needs to be, just entertaining. [...] I highly recommend "Blazing Fists". You will see a more restrained Takashi Miike than in other films, but don't worry, all the good stuff you are expecting from him is there!"

Reviewer A. W. Kautzer of The Movie Isle wrote, "Miike's film relishes the delight in subverting your expectations as an audience member. Sports films where a competition is at stake have specific plots that must end in a binary way (win or lose). That binary nature can sometimes make sports films the most formulaic of all genre films. The best are the ones that chart the least expected path while honoring the tropes (not clichés) of the genre. [...] Blazing Fists is one of the few sports films that ends on such a crowd-pleasing, stand-up-and-cheer but ambiguous note. In that moment, in a freeze frame, there is no need to know anything more than we do. Both heroes have proven their worth as not just fighters and warriors, but worthy men whose code of honor is an example to others around them. Blazing Fists may at first seem an odd duck in the career of Miike. When one sees the amount of brazenly subversive things done in this film matched so winningly with a commercial formula … one understands how this may be one of the best examples of what Miike does better than anyone."

The website joshatthemovies.com gave the film 2.5 out of 5 stars. The review reads, "The emotional stakes early on show real promise, which is a bummer considering the sputter of momentum. Despite a punchy beginning, Blazing Fists sags under the weight of familiar tropes and rushed character arcs. The second half becomes a series of recycled fight scenes and melodramatic filler. The promised payoff never comes to frution [sic]—even a slow-mo rain walk to a catchy Japanese tune cannot fully mount the shortcomings. Still, both Kaname Yoshizawa and Danhi Kinoshita are excellent, and taken as a character piece, there are some worthy moments to be found. Even if it does not fully work, seeing Miike still experimenting this late in his career through tone and style remains worthy of a watch."

Reviewer Sean Boelman of fandomwire.com wrote, "The conceit behind Blazing Fists — eschewing the traditional biopic in favor of a story where Asakura plays himself — would be intriguing were it not for the fact that the result is just as conventional (if not more so) than the alternative. [...] Ultimately, it seems as if Kibayashi was far more interested in exploring the gang thriller/coming-of-age storyline than the MMA aspects of the story. This is evident from the movie’s actual climax — a street fight that boasts the impressive fight choreography and kinetic camerawork and editing that fans have come to expect from a Miike joint. This 15-minute sequence is fantastic and almost redeems the film until the ending leaves viewers with an unquestionably sour taste in their mouths."

Reviewer Rory O'Connor of The Film Stage gave the film a rating of B−, writing, "Despite this embarrassment of narrative and Miike's dogged ability to keep each plate spinning, momentum doesn’t always hold up at the pace one wishes. At its best, however, Blazing Fists zips by with flashes of surrealism and little-to-no irony. Take the scene in which Ikutu's father, speaking through the plexiglass of his prison's visiting room, tells his son that he will keep on fighting, and that he wants him (in case you forgot, an aspiring fighter) to keep fighting too. I'll bite."

Reviewer Sean Gilman of inreviewonline.com wrote, "Miike juggles all these plot threads with aplomb. We may not always know exactly which gang is which or what their motivations are, but we can trust that the director knows what he’s doing and it will all pay off in the end. [...] On top of this, Miike still gives us all the thrills of a traditional brawler. There are boxing matches that are intricate in their choreography and thoughtfulness, conveying something of the thinking match that goes into every fight. But there are also all-out street fights that are a chaos of flying fists, feet, and whatever other props happen to be lying around the back alleys and grimy bars of the Japanese underworld. [...] But more powerful still is Blazing Fists' coda, which should be the final boxing match, a showdown between the forces of the rich and powerful against the poor and honest. Instead, however, Miike cuts away from this at just the perfect moment, with the realization that the result of the fight itself isn’t what's important. What matters is that it happens at all and it wouldn't be possible without this wild community of weirdos, brought together in friendship by nothing other than a shared sense of humanity and justice and the beautiful belief that things don’t have to be the way they are."

Reviewer Costa Christoulas of keithlovesmovies.com gave the film a rating of 61/100, writing, "Blazing Fists is a hollow frame of Takashi Miike's distinct style, with underwhelming martial arts fighting and an unfocused narrative."

Reviewer Maxance Vincent of awardsradar.com gave the film a rating of 3.5 out of 5 stars, writing, "Blazing Fists exceeded all of my expectations, because I foolishly thought the movie would retread familiar beats from boxing movies, with a splash of Miike’s dark humor and profoundly human characters. It wasn’t at all like that. The boxing is there, sure, but when the final “Breaking Down” fight occurs, Miike does something way different than what most filmmakers would do. He knows that we know how this story ends, and prefers not to give us the satisfaction of observing it, because Ryoma and Ikuto have turned their life around in more than meaningful ways for their success to last an eternity."

Reviewer Timothy Lee of geeksofcolor.co gave the film a rating of 6 out of 10, writing, "Unfortunately, the film’s anime and manga influence is a double-edged sword. It comes with many of the same clichés, such as progressively introducing new side characters whose roles aren't thoroughly understood until later, when the story finally decides to share their backstory. While something like this is, at the very least, tolerable in a long-running series, it's much less so in a movie where having a focused and streamlined narrative is imperative. The film already features a pair of charismatic and interesting lead protagonists in Ryoma and Ikuto, whose arcs are compelling enough to carry a 2-hour movie. Adding more and more characters as the plot progresses doesn't add to anything other than just cluttering up space. Despite these flaws, Blazing Fists is still an enjoyable movie that I don’t regret seeing, even if I'm consciously aware Miike is capable of more than this."

Reviewer Harris Dang of intheirownleague.com gave the film a rating of 4 out of 5 stars, writing, "Overall, 'Blazing Fists' (2025) is an extremely entertaining and enjoyably subversive underdog tale. Tiptoeing the line between corny sincerity and self-awareness, Miike takes all the tropes of underdog sports films, coming-of-age stories and youth crime flicks to deliver what could be the best shōnen film adaptation not adapted by an actual shōnen. Recommended."

Reviewer Panos Kotzathanasis of asianmoviepulse.com wrote, "Although the drama does not work particularly well and the movie suffers in terms of script, the charisma of the protagonists, the homage aspect and the action definitely compensate, making 'Blazing Fists' a movie definitely worth watching, even if just for the fun it offers."

The review on thelastthingisee.com reads, "It's easy to think of Takashi Miike as always cranked up to eleven, with geysers of blood, giddy violence, and maybe a CGI chicken running around. There is some of that on display, like a kid in a neon track suit wielding a comically large mallet in a fight, but sometimes he likes to remind us that he can choose a lighter touch, and Blazing Fists is one of these. And correct me if I'm wrong, but I don’t believe that in his hundred-plus movies he's made an uplifting sports drama about the power of friendship before. Though don’t worry, there’s a dude hanging out in a furry costume for no reason, so it’s not entirely normal."

Reviewer Lee B. Golden III of filmcombatsyndicate.com wrote, "Told from Ryoma's perspective and reportedly based on Asakura's own autobiography, Blazing Fists largely testifies to Ikuto and the impact he leaves in the events of this story. Storied redemption with youthful vigor, and the kind of massive action setpieces you would expect from a Miike film are on the menu in Blazing Fists. If you're a Miike fan and you’ve stuck around for this long, you’ll get a kick (or a punch) out of this one for certain."

== Home video ==
The Blu-ray and DVD of the film were released on July 25, 2025.

== Manga adaptation ==
The film inspired a manga adaptation based on the original story by Shin Kibayashi. The manga is drawn by Gohoubi. YOAKE FILM is credited as the original creator. Kodansha's Young Magazine began publishing the manga on October 11. The manga then moved to YanMaga Web on April 12. Kodansha published the manga's compiled book volumes in three volumes from January 20 to July 4.
