= Yamaguchi Shimbun =

Japanese newspaper

山口新聞 The Yamaguchi Shimbun
- Type: Daily newspaper
- Owner(s): Minato-Yamaguchi Co., Ltd.
- Founded: 1946
- Language: Japanese
- Headquarters: Shimonoseki
- Website: www.minato-yamaguchi.co.jp

The Yamaguchi Shimbun (山口新聞, Yamaguchi Shinbun) is a Japanese-language daily newspaper published by The Minato-Yamaguchi Co., Ltd. Headquartered in Shimonoseki, Yamaguchi. It was first published in Shimonoseki in 1946.

== Corporate profile ==
=== The Minato-Yamaguchi Co., Ltd. ===
- Publishing newspapers : Yamaguchi Shimbun, Minato Shimbun, etc.

==== Location ====
- Shimonoseki Head Office

1-1-7, Higashi-Yamato-machi, Shimonoseki, Yamaguchi, Japan

  - Tokyo, Osaka, Hiroshima, Shunan, Yamaguchi, Ube, Iwakuni, Yanai, Hofu, Hagi, Nagato, Mine, Sanyo-Onoda, Toyota, Toyoura
