= Razhabali Shaydullaev =

Kyrgyzstani mixed martial artist (born 2000)

Rajabali Shaidullaev
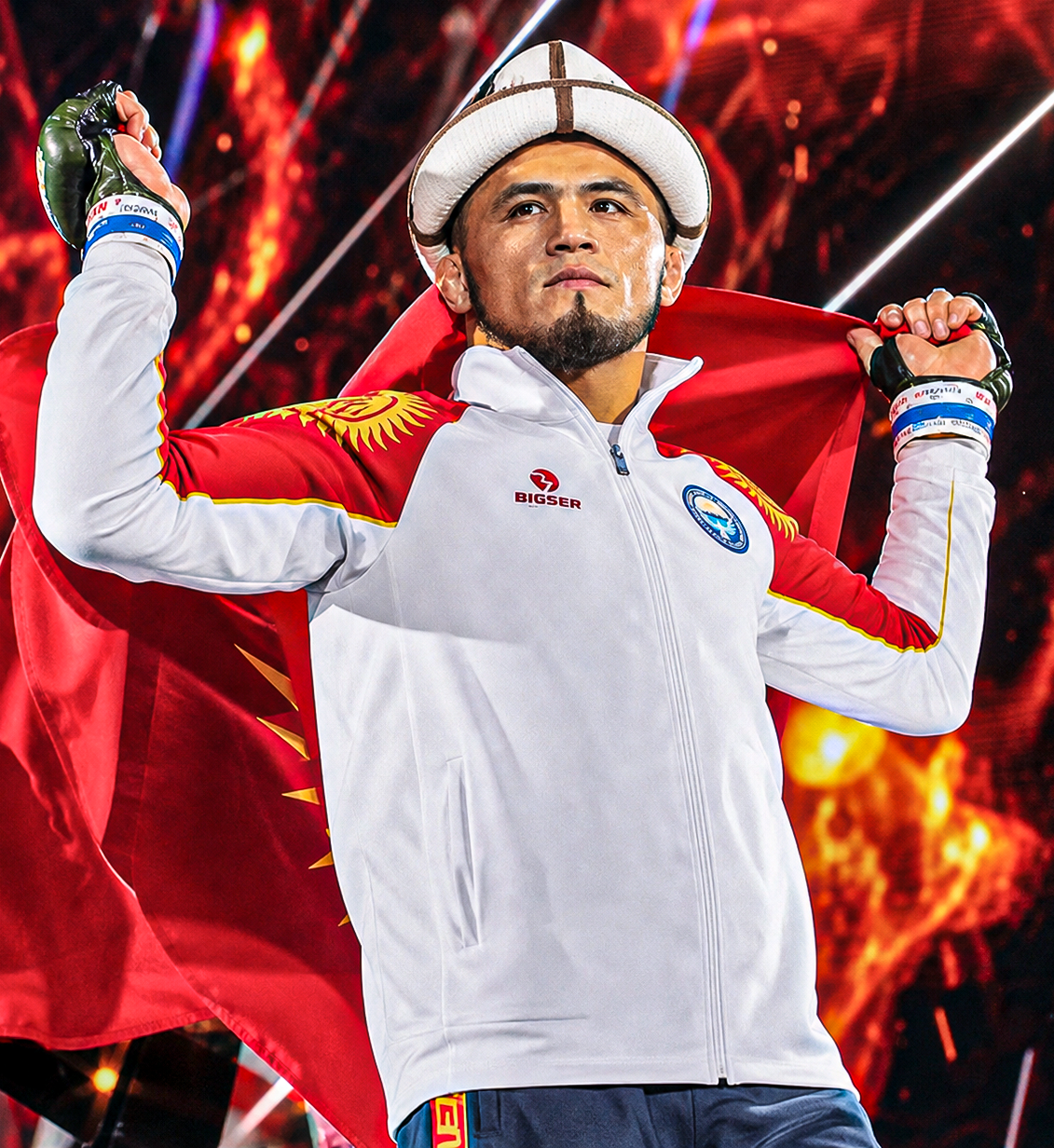
- Born: 11 October 2000 (age 26); Lakhsh, Tajikistan
- Native name: Ражабали Шайдуллаев
- Nationality: Kyrgyz
- Height: 5 ft 7 in (1.70 m)
- Weight: 145 lb (66 kg; 10 st 5 lb)
- Division: Featherweight (2019–2021, 2024–present); Bantamweight (2022–2023)
- Fighting out of: Bishkek, Kyrgyzstan
- Team: Ihlas
- Years active: 2019–present

Mixed martial arts record
- Total: 20
- Wins: 20
- By knockout: 7
- By submission: 12
- By decision: 1
- Losses: 0

Other information
- Mixed martial arts record from Sherdog

Rajabali Shaidullaev (Kyrgyz: Ражабали Шайдуллаев; born 11 October 2000) is a Kyrgyz mixed martial artist who competes in the featherweight division of Rizin Fighting Federation and Professional Fighters League (PFL), where he is the Rizin Featherweight Champion and the inaugural PFL Featherweight Champion.

In January 2026, he reached No. 6 in the featherweight rankings according to Fight Matrix.

== Background ==
Shaidullaev was born in the village of Jergetau in Lakhsh, near the border between Tajikistan and Kyrgyzstan, and spent his time in Tajikistan until high school. During high school, he played football and judo, and after graduating, he moved to Bishkek, Kyrgyzstan, where he started wrestling. Three years after starting wrestling, Shaidullaev switched to mixed martial arts and joined Ihlas MMA. He has competed in grappling and jiu-jitsu tournaments and won multiple times. He is also an Asian champion in combat jiu-jitsu.

== Professional mixed martial arts career ==
=== Early career ===
Shaidullaev made his professional mixed martial arts debut in 2019 at the Batyr Bashy tournament in Kyrgyzstan. He then competed in Russia's Absolute Championship Akhmat (ACA) and won three consecutive bouts. In 2022, he fought three bouts over four days at the amateur rules tournament "GAMMA," winning all three to win the GAMMA featherweight championship.

Shaidullaev was scheduled to make his ONE Championship debut against Martin Nguyen on 25 February 2023, at ONE Fight Night 7. He was forced to withdraw due to undisclosed reasons and was replaced by Leonardo Casotti.

In 2023, Shaidullaev competed in the Road FC Global 63 kg Tournament held by Road Fighting Championship (Road FC). In the quarterfinals, he submitted Yang Ji-yeon by rear-naked choke in the first round. He was scheduled to face Haraguchi Hiroshi in the semifinals in August, but was disqualified for being overweight (63.2 kg).

On 17 October 2023, Shaidullaev competed in the Emirati mixed martial arts promotion UAE Warriors. He defeated Magomed Al-Abdullah by rear-naked choke in the second round, bringing his record to 10–0. He then canceled his participation in the Road FC tournament third-place match, which was scheduled for 12 days later.

=== Rizin FF ===
In May 2024, Shaidullaev signed with Rizin, becoming the first Kyrgyz fighter to compete in the promotion. Making his promotional debut, he faced Koji Takeda at Rizin 47 on 9 June 2024. He won the bout by submission with a rear-naked choke.

Shaidullaev faced Juan Archuleta on 29 September 2024, at Rizin 48. He won the bout by armbar submission in the first round. The match was in danger of being canceled because Archuleta was 2.9 kg over the weigh-in the day before, but he said, "I don't care how much my opponent weighs, I want to fight," so the match was held with Archuleta shown a red card and with the condition that Shaidullaev's victory would be the official record.

Shaidullaev faced Yuta Kubo on 31 December 2024, at Rizin 49. He won the bout by TKO in the second round after a ground fight.

==== Rizin Featherweight Champion ====
Shaidullaev faced Kleber Koike Erbst for the Rizin featherweight title on 4 May 2025, at Rizin: Otoko Matsuri. He applied pressure with strikes from the beginning, cornered Koike Erbst near the ropes, and won by knockout in the first round with a one-two right straight followed by a follow-up right straight, becoming the 7th Rizin featherweight champion.

Shaidullaev faced Viktor Kolesnik on 28 September 2025, at Rizin 51. He landed a direct right straight in a one-two punch, and won by TKO in 33 seconds of the first round, successfully defending his title.

Shaidullaev faced Mikuru Asakura at Rizin: Shiwasu no Cho Tsuwamono Matsuri on 31 December 2025. He defended the title by TKO in the first round.

Shaidullaev faced Yuta Kubo in a rematch on 12 April 2026, at Rizin Landmark 13. He won the bout by TKO in the first round.

Shaidullaev defended his title against former Bellator Featherweight World Champion A. J. McKee, in a bout which also included the inaugural PFL Featherweight Championship being put on the line on 10 September 2026, at Super Rizin 5. He won the fight via unanimous decision.

== Fighting style ==
Shaidullaev has a wrestling background and started mixed martial arts after moving on to grappling. Regarding his appearance in Rizin in the featherweight (66.0 kg) division, he stated that he didn't have enough time to get down to 61 kg. On the other hand, he has also said that he doesn't mind either weight class and would fight in whichever weight class he was offered.

Shaidullaev is an all-round fighter who is strong in every situation, whether it's striking in the stand-up or grappling. He also excels at combat jiu-jitsu.

== Personal life ==
On 15 February 2026, the official Instagram account of Kyrgyz media outlet MMA KYRGYZ reported that Shaidullaev had married.

== Championships and accomplishments ==
- Rizin Fighting Federation
  - Rizin Featherweight Championship (One time, current)
    - Four successful title defenses
- Professional Fighters League
  - PFL Featherweight Championship (One time; current; inaugural)
- MMA Fighting
  - 2025 Third Team MMA All-Star

== Mixed martial arts record ==
Professional record breakdown
20 matches	20 wins	0 losses
By knockout	7	0
By submission	12	0
By decision	1	0

Res.	Record	Opponent	Method	Event	Date	Round	Time	Location	Notes
Win	20–0	A. J. McKee	Decision (unanimous)	Super Rizin 5	10 September 2026	3	5:00	Osaka, Japan	Defended the Rizin Featherweight Championship; Won the inaugural PFL Featherweight Championship.
Win	19–0	Yuta Kubo	TKO (punches)	Rizin Landmark 13	12 April 2026	1	4:13	Fukuoka, Japan	Defended the Rizin Featherweight Championship.
Win	18–0	Mikuru Asakura	TKO (punches)	Rizin: Shiwasu no Cho Tsuwamono Matsuri	31 December 2025	1	2:54	Saitama, Japan	Defended the Rizin Featherweight Championship.
Win	17–0	Viktor Kolesnik	TKO (punches)	Rizin 51	28 September 2025	1	0:33	Nagoya, Japan	Defended the Rizin Featherweight Championship.
Win	16–0	Kleber Koike Erbst	KO (punches)	Rizin: Otoko Matsuri	4 May 2025	1	1:02	Tokyo, Japan	Won the Rizin Featherweight Championship.
Win	15–0	Yuta Kubo	TKO (punches)	Rizin 49	31 December 2024	2	2:30	Saitama, Japan	
Win	14–0	Juan Archuleta	Submission (armbar)	Rizin 48	29 September 2024	1	3:12	Saitama, Japan	
Win	13–0	Koji Takeda	Submission (rear-naked choke)	Rizin 47	9 June 2024	1	4:42	Tokyo, Japan	Return to Featherweight.
Win	12–0	Magomed Al-Abdullah	Submission (rear-naked choke)	UAE Warriors 45	17 October 2023	2	3:40	Abu Dhabi, United Arab Emirates	Catchweight (139 lb) bout.
Win	11–0	Yang Ji-yong	Submission (rear-naked choke)	Road FC 64	24 June 2023	1	4:00	Wonju, South Korea	2023 Road FC Bantamweight Tournament Quarterfinal.
Win	10–0	Islam Babatov	Submission (triangle choke)	ACA Young Eagles 30	16 October 2022	2	2:52	Tolstoy-Yurt, Russia	
Win	9–0	Asvad Akhmadov	Submission (anaconda choke)	ACA Young Eagles 27	25 June 2022	2	0:50	Tolstoy-Yurt, Russia	
Win	8–0	Anzor Elgaraev	TKO (punches)	ACA Young Eagles 26	31 March 2022	2	3:20	Tolstoy-Yurt, Russia	Bantamweight debut.
Win	7–0	Abdulla Saidov	TKO (punches)	Batyr Bashy 11	24 October 2021	1	2:56	Arashan, Kyrgyzstan	
Win	6–0	Timur Zhoroev	Submission (triangle choke)	PFL Kyrgyzstan: Bitva Na Vershine	31 August 2020	1	4:46	Bishkek, Kyrgyzstan	Won the vacant PFLKG Featherweight Championship.
Win	5–0	Sunatillo Nasulloev	Submission (kneebar)	Batyr Bashy 8	28 February 2020	1	3:08	Bishkek, Kyrgyzstan	
Win	4–0	Temurlan Arestanov	Submission (heel hook)	Batyr Bashy 7	6 November 2019	1	1:34	Bishkek, Kyrgyzstan	
Win	3–0	Manas Kurstanbekov	Submission (triangle choke)	Batyr Bashy 5	24 August 2019	2	3:24	Talas, Kyrgyzstan	
Win	2–0	Samat Kylychbek Uulu	Submission (kneebar)	Batyr Bashy 4	3 July 2019	1	2:45	Issyk-Kul, Kyrgyzstan	
Win	1–0	Abdulla Safaralizoda	Submission (rear-naked choke)	EFC Global 2	29 June 2019	1	2:38	Osh, Kyrgyzstan	Featherweight debut.

== See also ==
- List of current Rizin Fighting Federation fighters
- List of male mixed martial artists
