= 港区 =

港区 or 港區 may refer to:

- Several places in Japan named Minato-ku (港区):
  - Minato, Tokyo or Minato City, a special ward in Tokyo, Japan
  - Minato-ku, Nagoya, a ward of Nagoya, Japan
  - Minato-ku, Osaka, a ward of Osaka, Japan
- The Hong Kong Special Administrative Region (HKSAR) (Chinese: 港區; lit. '[Hong] Kong Region'), especially in several contexts relating to the PRC:
  - The Hong Kong national security law (Chinese: 港區國安法)
  - Hong Kong members of the National Committee of the Chinese People's Political Consultative Conference (Chinese: 港區全國政協委員)
  - Hong Kong delegates of the National People's Congress (Chinese: 港區全國人大代表)

== See also ==
- Minato (disambiguation)
