= Mikuru Asakura =

Japanese mixed martial artist (born 1992)

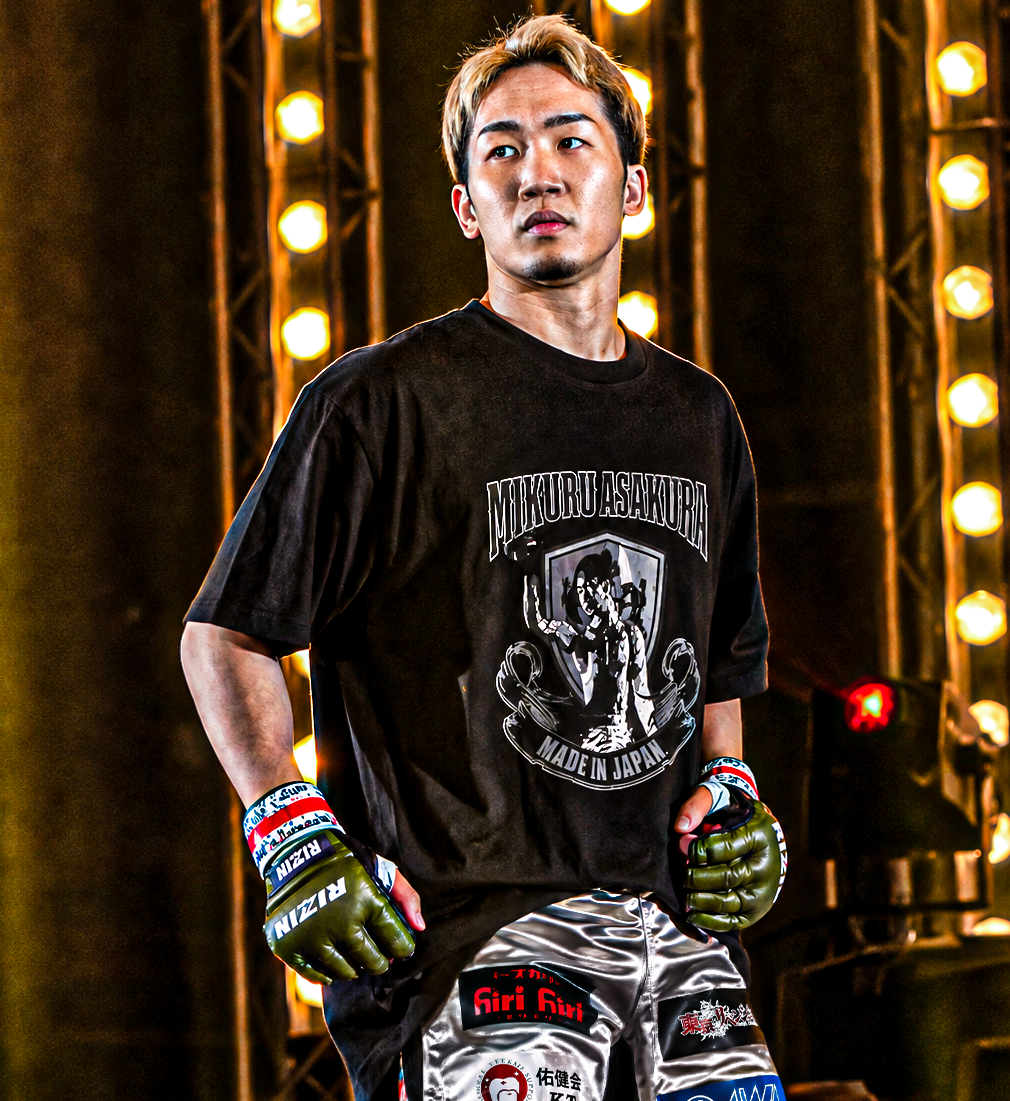
- Born: 15 July 1992 (age 34); Toyohashi, Aichi, Japan
- Native name: 朝倉 未来
- Height: 5 ft 10 in (1.78 m)
- Weight: 145 lb (66 kg; 10 st 5 lb)
- Division: Featherweight
- Reach: 70 in (178 cm)
- Stance: Southpaw
- Fighting out of: Tokyo, Japan
- Team: JAPAN TOP TEAM
- Rank: Purple belt in Brazilian Jiu-Jitsu
- Years active: 2012–present

Kickboxing record
- Total: 1
- Losses: 1
- By knockout: 1

Mixed martial arts record
- Total: 27
- Wins: 20
- By knockout: 10
- By submission: 1
- By decision: 9
- Losses: 6
- By knockout: 2
- By submission: 2
- By decision: 2
- No contests: 1

Amateur record
- Total: 10
- Wins: 9
- By knockout: 5
- By submission: 2
- By decision: 2
- Losses: 1
- By submission: 1

Other information
- Notable relatives: Kai Asakura (brother)
- Mixed martial arts record from Sherdog

Mikuru Asakura

YouTube information
- Channel: 朝倉未来 Mikuru Asakura
- Years active: 2018–present
- Genre: entertainment
- Subscribers: 3.42 million
- Views: 2.02 billion
- Last updated: 4 September 2024

Mikuru Asakura (朝倉 未来, Asakura Mikuru; born 15 July 1992) is a Japanese mixed martial artist who competes in the featherweight division of Rizin Fighting Federation. He also competed for Road Fighting Championship, Fighting Network Rings and DEEP.

He is a former Fighting Network Rings 143-pound and 154-pound champion. Along with his mixed martial arts career, he is also a popular YouTuber in Japan.

He is the older brother of Kai Asakura.

== Early life ==
Mikuru started his interest in martial arts training karate in elementary school, however he also played volleyball for three years.

Mikuru, along with his brother Kai Asakura, were involved in numerous street fights in their childhood, even fighting each other. As they got older, a therapist suggested to their mother to enroll them into boxing classes.

While studying at the Aichi Prefectural Toyohashi Technical High School, the Asakura brothers went to Zen Dokai Toyohashi Dojo, where they were first introduced to mixed martial arts.

== Mixed martial arts career ==
=== Amateur career ===
Mikuru Asakura, as well as his brother Kai, fought their first amateur MMA fights under the Outsider brand of Fighting Network Rings. The Outsider brand was geared towards problematic youth, with focus on rehabilitating delinquents, criminals and gang members with MMA. He would later fight professionally with Outsider.

After winning his first amateur bout, against Kohei Shimada, with a first round rear-naked choke, Asakura put together a 6–1 record with 5 stoppages, only losing to Takehiro Higuchi.

=== Early career ===
Mikuru Asakura began his professional career in 2012 under the DEEP promotion, where he faced a fellow debutante Kavinesh Raviendaran . Asakura won the bout via TKO within 53 seconds. After a three-year hiatus, Mikuru returned to fight under the Outsider promotion, a spin off of the Fighting Network Rings promotion. He faced Keinosuke Yoshinaga, whom he defeated TKO in the first round to claim the Outsider 154 lbs Championship in just his 2nd professional bout at The Outsider 26. Four months later in his very next bout at The Outsider 38, Asakura beat Takehiro Higuchi (the sole man to defeat him to that point) to claim the 143 lbs Championship. Asakura would defend his 143-lb title 9 months later at The Outsider 42 against Hiroyuki Furuta before competing in ROAD FC. Under the banner off Road Fighting Championship at Road FC 37, Asakura fought Doo Seok Oh, who he beat by TKO in the first round.

Asakura would suffer his first career loss in a surprising unanimous decision to journeyman Kil Woo Lee during Road FC 43. However, he rebounded with a unanimous decision victory over Kosuke Terashima six months later at DEEP 83 Impact.

=== Rizin Fighting Federation ===
Mikuru Asakura made his Rizin debut on 12 August 2018, during Rizin 12. Asakura faced former Shooto featherweight champion and Japanese MMA legend, Hatsu Hioki. Mikuru won the fight in at 3:45 of the first round after knocking Hioki down with a head kick and following up with punches.

Asakura next faced Karshyga Dautbek at Rizin 13. Asakura employed an effective use of grappling and striking to outpoint the Kazakh fighter, and won a unanimous decision.

During Rizin: Heisei's Last Yarennoka!, Mikuru Asakura fought another former Shooto Featherweight Champion - this time being Takeshi Inoue. Asakura finished the bout with a well-timed knee that floored the former champion.

Mikuru Asakura's next fight was to be at Rizin 15 against Luiz Gustavo. He defeated Gustavo via unanimous decision.

At his next bout at Rizin 17 against fellow Rizin standout, Yusuke Yachi - in his first main event for RIZIN. Uniquely, this bout was prefaced with intensity and heated comments direct at one another, with both fighters saying that they couldn't stand one another. Yachi said that Asakura was afraid of him, while Mikuru told Yachi that he was not intelligent and that his YouTube content was 'crap'. Asakura scored a knockdown with seconds left in the bout en route to a unanimous decision victory.

After compiling a five-fight winning streak, Asakura was given a chance to represent Rizin against one of Bellator's fighters in the upcoming Rizin 20 event. In a match against former TUF Brazil Team Wanderlei contestant, John Macapa, Asakura won a unanimous decision to hand the veteran just his 5th loss of his 30-fight career.

At Rizin 21, Asakura faced TUF LA 2 Team Gastelum contestant, Daniel Salas as the main event. At 2:34 of the second round, Asakura landed a head kick and followed up with punches to end the contest.

==== Title shot ====
After going 7–0 in the promotion and increasing in popularity, Rizin set up a title match for the inaugural Featherweight title between Asakura and reigning Shooto Featherweight Champion, Yutaka Saito at Rizin 25 on November 21, 2020. Asakura lost via unanimous decision in his 3rd main event bout.

Despite having suffered his first loss, Asakura quickly turned around and fought at the annual NYE show at Rizin 26. He faced Satoshi Yamasu, and won by TKO in the first round, after landing his patented head kick, and following up with punches.

Mikuru faced Kleber Koike Erbst at Rizin 28. He lost the bout after being choked unconscious via triangle choke.

==== Winning streak and return to title contention ====
Mikuru faced Kyohei Hagiwara on October 10, 2021, at Rizin Landmark Vol.1. He won the bout via unanimous decision.

Asakura rematched Yutaka Saito at Rizin 33 - Saitama on December 31, 2021. He won the bout via unanimous decision.

Mikuru faced the former Rizin FF Featherweight champion Juntaro Ushiku at Rizin Landmark 5 on April 29, 2023. He won the fight by unanimous decision.

==== Second title shot ====
Asakura next faced Vugar Karamov for the vacant Rizin Featherweight Championship at Bellator MMA x Rizin 2 on July 30, 2023. He lost the fight via a rear-naked choke submission in the first round.

Asakura is scheduled to face Shinya Aoki on September 10, 2026 at Super Rizin 5.

== Boxing ==
=== Asakura vs Mayweather ===
On June 13, 2022, Asakura announced he would be competing in a boxing exhibition bout against former world champion and boxing hall of famer, Floyd Mayweather. The fight would be at the Rizin event scheduled on September 25, 2022, at the Saitama Super Arena. Asakura lost the bout by 2nd-round TKO.

== Kickboxing career ==
Asakura made his professional kickboxing debut against YA-MAN at the inaugural "Fight Club" event. The fight was contested in open-finger gloves, under kickboxing rules and at the lightweight (-70 kg) limit. He lost the fight by a first-round knockout.

== In other media ==
Asakura makes a cameo appearance as himself in the game Like a Dragon: Infinite Wealth He provides the voice in the Japanese language, while John Choi provides his English language voice.

=== Breaking Down ===
Breaking Down is an amateur kickboxing tournament organized by Mikuru. Street fighters, kickboxers, and mixed martial artists compete in short one-minute rounds. The event has gained popularity due to its underground entertainment and reality show aspect featuring the personalities of the fighters, but it has also been the subject of strong criticism due to the occasional low-level fights that occur as martial art and the criminal behavior of some of the fighters after their participation in the tournament.

Takashi Miike's 2025 film Blazing Fists features the fighters of Breaking Down.

== Championships and achievements ==
=== Mixed martial arts ===
- Fighting Network Rings
  - RINGS 65 kg Championship (One time)
  - RINGS 70 kg Championship (One time)

== Mixed martial arts record ==
Professional record breakdown
27 matches	20 wins	6 losses
By knockout	10	2
By submission	1	2
By decision	9	2
No contests	1	

Res.	Record	Opponent	Method	Event	Date	Round	Time	Location	Notes
Win	20–6 (1)	Shinya Aoki	KO (punches)	Super Rizin 5	September 10, 2026	1	2:39	Osaka, Japan	Return to Lightweight.
Loss	19–6 (1)	Razhabali Shaydullaev	TKO (punches)	Rizin: Shiwasu no Cho Tsuwamono Matsuri	December 31, 2025	1	2:54	Saitama, Japan	For the Rizin Featherweight Championship.
Win	19–5 (1)	Kleber Koike Erbst	Decision (split)	Super Rizin 4	July 27, 2025	3	5:00	Saitama, Japan	
Win	18–5 (1)	Chihiro Suzuki	TKO (doctor stoppage)	Rizin: Otoko Matsuri	May 4, 2025	3	1:56	Tokyo, Japan	
Loss	17–5 (1)	Ren Hiramoto	KO (punches)	Super Rizin 3	July 28, 2024	1	2:18	Saitama, Japan	For the symbolic Rizin "Last Man Standing" title.
Loss	17–4 (1)	Vugar Keramov	Submission (rear-naked choke)	Super Rizin 2	July 30, 2023	1	2:41	Saitama, Japan	For the vacant Rizin Featherweight Championship.
Win	17–3 (1)	Juntaro Ushiku	Decision (unanimous)	Rizin Landmark 5	April 29, 2023	3	5:00	Tokyo, Japan	
Win	16–3 (1)	Yutaka Saito	Decision (unanimous)	Rizin 33	December 31, 2021	3	5:00	Saitama, Japan	
Win	15–3 (1)	Kyohei Hagiwara	Decision (unanimous)	Rizin Landmark 1	October 2, 2021	3	5:00	Tokyo, Japan	Catchweight (150 lb) bout.
Loss	14–3 (1)	Kleber Koike Erbst	Technical Submission (triangle choke)	Rizin 28	June 13, 2021	2	1:49	Tokyo, Japan	
Win	14–2 (1)	Satoshi Yamasu	KO (head kick and punch)	Rizin 26	December 31, 2020	1	4:20	Saitama, Japan	Catchweight (150 lb) bout.
Loss	13–2 (1)	Yutaka Saito	Decision (unanimous)	Rizin 25	November 21, 2020	3	5:00	Osaka, Japan	For the inaugural Rizin Featherweight Championship.
Win	13–1 (1)	Daniel Salas	KO (head kick and punches)	Rizin 21	February 22, 2020	2	2:34	Hamamatsu, Japan	Catchweight (150 lb) bout.
Win	12–1 (1)	John Macapá	Decision (unanimous)	Rizin 20	December 31, 2019	3	5:00	Saitama, Japan	
Win	11–1 (1)	Yusuke Yachi	Decision (unanimous)	Rizin 17	July 29, 2019	3	5:00	Tokyo, Japan	Lightweight bout.
Win	10–1 (1)	Luiz Gustavo	Decision (unanimous)	Rizin 15	April 21, 2019	3	5:00	Yokohama, Japan	Catchweight (150 lb) bout.
Win	9–1 (1)	Takeshi Inoue	TKO (flying knee and punches)	Rizin: Heisei's Last Yarennoka!	December 31, 2018	2	2:39	Tokyo, Japan	Catchweight (150 lb) bout.
Win	8–1 (1)	Karshyga Dautbek	Decision (unanimous)	Rizin 13	September 30, 2018	3	5:00	Saitama, Japan	
Win	7–1 (1)	Hatsu Hioki	TKO (head kick and punches)	Rizin 12	August 12, 2018	1	3:45	Nagoya, Japan	
Win	6–1 (1)	Kosuke Terashima	Decision (unanimous)	DEEP 83 Impact	April 28, 2018	2	5:00	Tokyo, Japan	
Loss	5–1 (1)	Lee Kil-woo	Decision (unanimous)	Road FC 043	October 28, 2017	3	5:00	Seoul, South Korea	
Win	5–0 (1)	Oh Doo-seok	TKO (head kick and punches)	Road FC 037	March 11, 2017	1	4:06	Seoul, South Korea	
Win	4–0 (1)	Hiroyuki Furuta	KO (punch)	The Outsider 42	September 4, 2016	1	1:32	Toyokawa, Japan	Defended the RINGS Featherweight Championship.
NC	3–0 (1)	Ryo Asami	NC (overturned)	The Outsider 39	March 27, 2016	2	2:12	Tokyo, Japan	Retained the RINGS Lightweight Championship.
Win	3–0	Takehiro Higuchi	Submission (rear-naked choke)	The Outsider 38	December 13, 2015	1	3:17	Tokyo, Japan	Featherweight debut. Won the RINGS Featherweight Championship.
Win	2–0	Keinosuke Yoshinaga	KO (punch)	The Outsider 36	July 19, 2015	1	2:53	Tokyo, Japan	Won the RINGS Lightweight Championship.
Win	1–0	Morikazu Itagaki	KO (punch)	DEEP Cage Impact 2012	September 16, 2012	1	0:53	Hamamatsu, Japan	Lightweight debut.

Exhibition record breakdown		
1 match	1 win	0 losses
By submission	1	0

Res.	Record	Opponent	Method	Event	Date	Round	Time	Location	Notes
Win	1–0	Hikaru Saito	TKO (punches)	E.P.W. Heroes	November 24, 2019	1	0:25	Matsuyama, Japan	

== Amateur mixed martial arts record ==
Amateur record breakdown		
8 matches	7 wins	1 loss
By knockout	5	0
By submission	1	1
By decision	1	0

Res.	Record	Opponent	Method	Event	Date	Round	Time	Location	Notes
Win	7–1	Hiroki Takahashi	KO (punch)	The Outsider 34	March 21, 2015	1	0:23	Tokyo, Japan	
Win	6–1	Kazunari Kimura	TKO (punches)	The Outsider 33	December 7, 2014	1	2:27	Yokohama, Japan	
Win	5–1	Rikuto Shirakawa	Decision (unanimous)	The Outsider 30	April 6, 2014	2	3:00	Tokyo, Japan	
Win	4–1	Jamal Morgan	TKO (punches)	The Outsider 29	February 16, 2014	1	1:57	Tokyo, Japan	
Loss	3–1	Takehiro Higuchi	Submission (ankle lock)	The Outsider 28	December 7, 2013	1	1:06	Kadoma, Japan	
Win	3–0	Musashi	TKO (punches)	The Outsider 26	June 9, 2013	2	0:21	Yokohama, Japan	
Win	2–0	Ryuma Anno	TKO (punches)	The Outsider 25	April 21, 2013	1	2:35	Tokyo, Japan	
Win	1–0	Kohei Shimada	Submission (rear-naked choke)	The Outsider 24	February 10, 2013	1	1:56	Tokyo, Japan	

== Exhibition boxing record ==
1 fight	0 wins	1 loss
By knockout	0	1

No.	Result	Record	Opponent	Type	Round, time	Date	Location	Notes
1	Loss	0–1	Floyd Mayweather Jr.	TKO	2 (3), 2:59	Sep 25, 2022	Saitama Super Arena, Saitama, Japan	

== Kickboxing record ==
Kickboxing record
0 wins, 1 loss, 0 Draw, 0 No Contest
Date	Result	Opponent	Event	Location	Method	Round	Time
2023-11-19	Loss	(Japan) YA-MAN	Fight Club	Tokyo, Japan	KO (Punches)	1	1:17

== Bibliography ==
- 『強者の流儀』Kyōsha no ryūgi(KADOKAWA、2020)
- 『路上の伝説』Rojō no densetsu(KADOKAWA、2020)

== See also ==
- List of current Rizin FF fighters
- List of male mixed martial artists
