= Kleber Koike Erbst =

Japanese mixed martial artist

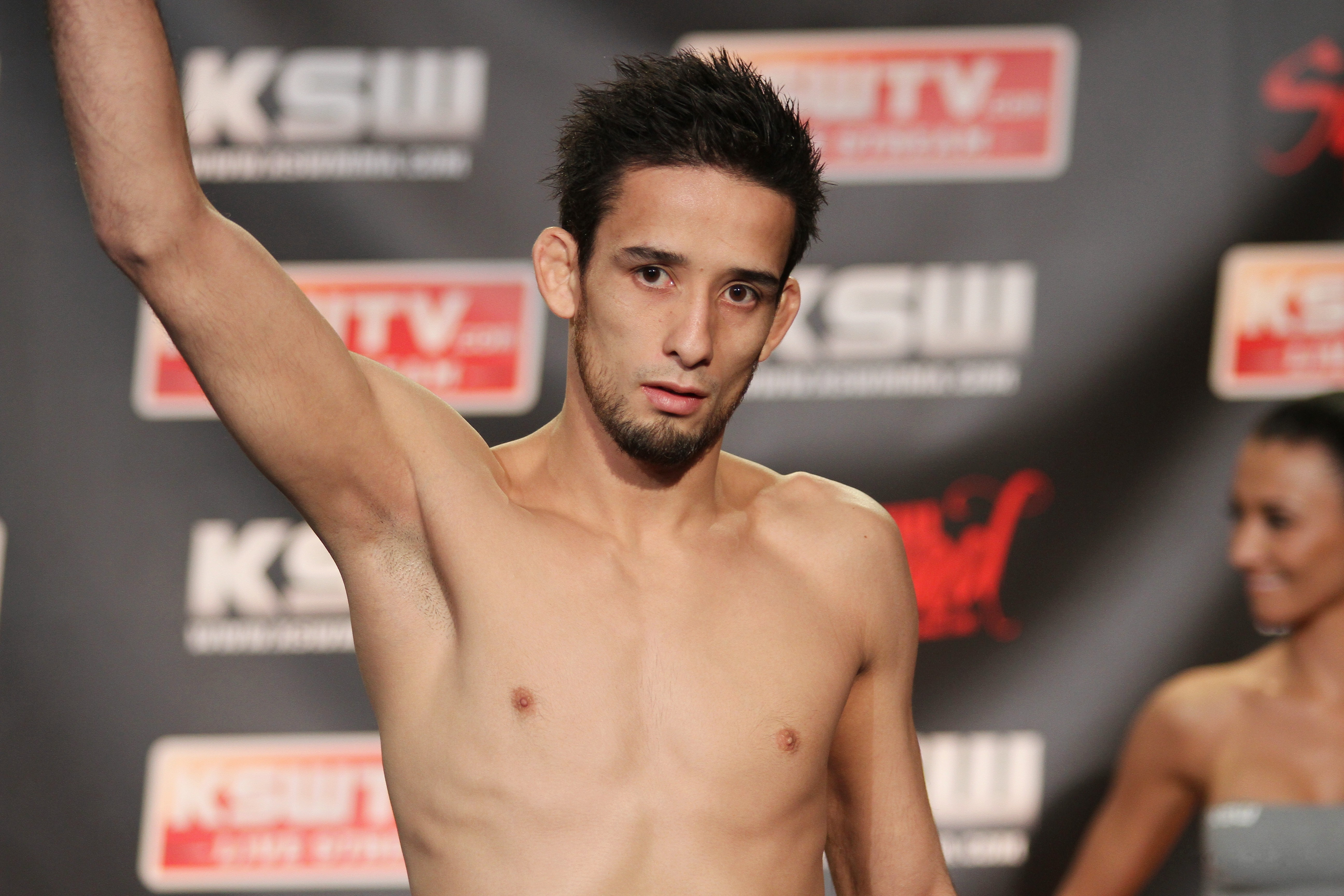
- Born: October 16, 1989 (age 37); São Paulo, Brazil
- Nationality: Japanese
- Height: 5 ft 10 in (1.78 m)
- Weight: 145 lb (66 kg; 10 st 5 lb)
- Division: Featherweight
- Style: Brazilian Jiu-Jitsu, Submission Wrestling
- Fighting out of: Hamamatsu, Japan
- Team: Bonsai Jiu-Jitsu
- Rank: 2nd degree Black belt in Brazilian jiu-jitsu under Marcos Yoshio de Souza
- Years active: 2008–present

Mixed martial arts record
- Total: 47
- Wins: 35
- By knockout: 2
- By submission: 29
- By decision: 4
- Losses: 10
- By knockout: 1
- By submission: 1
- By decision: 7
- By disqualification: 1
- Draws: 1
- No contests: 1

Other information
- Mixed martial arts record from Sherdog

Kleber Koike Erbst (クレベル・コイケ・エルベスト, Kureberu Koike Erubesuto; born October 16, 1989) is a Brazilian-born Japanese mixed martial artist who competes in the Featherweight division of Rizin Fighting Federation, where he is the former two-time Rizin Featherweight Champion. He has also competed in Konfrontacja Sztuk Walki (KSW), where is the former KSW Featherweight Champion.

== Background ==
Born in São Paulo, Brazil, to a Brazilian father of German, Portuguese and Japanese descent and a Japanese mother, Kleber lived in Brazil in his teenage years, until financial troubles led his parents to move to Japan. Erbst initially stayed in Brazil with relatives, but at the age of 14, joined them in Japan. Initially intending to help his parents and return to Brazil, but once he met jiu-jitsu, he decided to stay in Japan. When financial crisis hit Japan, his parents decided to move back to Brazil, leaving behind an 18 years old Erbst who wanted to stay. To finance his fighting career, Erbst took odd jobs such as construction, trash collection, etc. to pay for the sign-up fees.

== Mixed martial arts career ==
Bonsai Jiu-jitsu club competitor, submission specialist. His favorite technique is Triangle choke. A holder of a black belt Brazilian jiu-jitsu from the city of Iwata. In 2008–2014 he fought mainly at Japanese galas DEEP and Rings, beating at that time, among others of the former Shooto champion of Hideki Kadowaka.

=== Konfrontacja Sztuk Walki ===
At the KSW 30: Genesis defeated Anzor Azhiev by triangle choke in the 1st round. He was also awarded the Submission of the Night bonus award.

After a successful debut for the KSW, he took part in a featherweight tournament organized by the Chinese federation Rebel FC, which won and became a champion, defeating the American Miguel Torres.

At KSW 33: Materla vs. Khalidov, which took place on November 28, 2015, fought a duel with Artur Sowiński for the inaugural KSW Featherweight Championship, eventually losing by the judges' decision. Both were awarded the Fight of the Night bonus award.

After another stint returning to Asia, picking two third round submission wins at Pancrase 277 and Rebel FC 4, Kleber returned to KSW, facing Leszek Krakowski on October 1, 2016, at KSW 36. He won the bout via triangle choke in the first round. He was awarded the Submission of the Night bonus award.

=== Featherweight championship and loss of the title ===
On May 27, 2017, at the KSW 39 held at the Stadion Narodowy, he won the KSW Featherweight Championship, defeating then featherweight champion Marcin Wrzosek via unanimous decision.

Kleber was to defend his title against Artur Sowiński at KSW 41 on December 23, 2017. However, after missing weight, Erbst was stripped of the belt, meaning only Sowiński was eligible for the title. Erbst won the bout via rear-naked choke in the third round.

Kleber was scheduled to rematch Marcin Wrzosek for the vacant featherweight title on June 9, 2018, at KSW 44. However Wrzosek suffered a pectoral muscle tear and was forced out of the rematch. As a result, Marian Ziółkowski stepped in against Erbst in a catchweight fight. Erbst won the bout via armbar in the first round. He was awarded the Submission of the Month bonus award.

Kleber faced Mateusz Gamrot on December 1, 2018, at KSW 46: Narkun vs. Khalidov 2. He lost the bout via a unanimous decision.

=== Rizin Fighting Federation ===
After a first round submission win at ONE Japan Series against Akiyo Nishiura, Kleber made his Rizin debut on December 31, 2020, at during Rizin 26 against Kyle Aguon He won the bout via brabo choke in the first round.

Kleber faced Kazumasa Majima at Rizin 27 on March 21, 2021. He won via triangle choke in the second round.

Kleber faced Mikuru Asakura at Rizin 28. He won the bout after choking Mikuru unconscious via triangle choke.

Kleber headlined Rizin Trigger 2 on February 23, 2022, against Ulka Sasaki. After overcoming a knockdown in the first round, Kleber submitted Sasaki in the second round via rear-naked choke.

Kleber faced Kyohei Hagiwara on May 5, 2022, in the main event of Rizin Landmark 3. He won the bout in the first round with a face crank.

==== Rizin FF Featherweight championship ====
On October 23, 2022, Kleber faced reigning champion Juntaro Ushiku for the Rizin Featherweight Championship at Rizin 39. taking control in the first round with a tackle takedown, and in the second round, he threw him down with a hip throw and set up a triangle choke to win by triangle choke to win the title.

Kleber faced reigning Bellator Featherweight Champion Patrício Pitbull in a non-title bout at Bellator MMA vs. Rizin on December 31, 2022. He lost the bout by unanimous decision.

==== Rizin title stripped ====
Kleber was set to make his first title defense against Chihiro Suzuki on June 24, 2023, at Rizin 43. At the weigh-ins, Kleber weighed in at 145.88 pounds, 0.88 pounds over the divisional title limit. As a result, upon commencement of the fight, Kleber was officially stripped of the championship, and only Suzuki is eligible to win the title. Although Kleber submitted Suzuki via triangle choke at the 2:59 minute mark of the opening round, the fight result was immediately overturned into a no-contest, due to Kleber's weight miss.

Koike Erbst faced Masanori Kanehara at Rizin 44 on September 24, 2023. He lost the bout via unanimous decision, having his BJJ skills be nullified by Kanehara's wrestling acumen.

Koike Erbst faced Yutaka Saito on December 31, 2023, at Rizin 45, and won the bout via brabo choke in the third round.

Koike Erbst next faced former Bellator and Rizin Bantamweight champion Juan Archuleta at Rizin 47 on June 9, 2024. He won the fight via an inverted heel hook submission in the first round.

==== Regaining Rizin FF Featherweight championship ====
Koike Erbst faced Chihiro Suzuki in a rematch for the Rizin Featherweight Championship at Rizin 49 on December 31, 2024. He won the bout via unanimous decision.

Koike Erbst faced Razhabali Shaydullaev for the Rizin featherweight title on May 4, 2025, at Rizin: Otoko Matsuri. He lost the title by knockout in the first round.

== Championships and accomplishments ==
=== Mixed martial arts ===
- Rizin Fighting Federation
  - Rizin Featherweight Championship (Two times)
  - Most submission wins in Rizin FF history (seven)
- Konfrontacja Sztuk Walki
  - KSW Featherweight Championship (One time; former)
  - Submission of the Night (three times) vs. Anzor Azhiev, Leszek Krakowski and Marian Ziółkowski
  - Fight of the Night (one time) vs. Artur Sowiński
- Rebel FC
  - Rebel FC Featherweight Tournament Winner
- MMA Fighting
  - 2022 Third Team MMA All-Star

== Mixed martial arts record ==
Professional record breakdown
47 matches	35 wins	10 losses
By knockout	2	1
By submission	29	1
By decision	4	7
By disqualification	0	1
Draws	1	
No contests	1	

Res.	Record	Opponent	Method	Event	Date	Round	Time	Location	Notes
Loss	35–10–1 (1)	Kyoma Akimoto	Decision (unanimous)	Rizin 54	August 11, 2026	3	5:00	Tokyo, Japan	
Win	35–9–1 (1)	Vugar Karamov	Decision (unanimous)	Rizin: Shiwasu no Cho Tsuwamono Matsuri	December 31, 2025	3	5:00	Saitama, Japan	
Loss	34–9–1 (1)	Mikuru Asakura	Decision (split)	Super Rizin 4	July 27, 2025	3	5:00	Saitama, Japan	
Loss	34–8–1 (1)	Razhabali Shaydullaev	KO (punches)	Rizin: Otoko Matsuri	May 4, 2025	1	1:02	Tokyo, Japan	Lost the Rizin Featherweight Championship.
Win	34–7–1 (1)	Chihiro Suzuki	Decision (unanimous)	Rizin 49	December 31, 2024	3	5:00	Saitama, Japan	Won the Rizin Featherweight Championship.
Win	33–7–1 (1)	Juan Archuleta	Submission (inverted heel hook)	Rizin 47	June 9, 2024	1	2:25	Tokyo, Japan	
Win	32–7–1 (1)	Yutaka Saito	Technical Submission (brabo choke)	Rizin 45	December 31, 2023	3	1:22	Saitama, Japan	
Loss	31–7–1 (1)	Masanori Kanehara	Decision (unanimous)	Rizin 44	September 24, 2023	3	5:00	Saitama, Japan	
NC	31–6–1 (1)	Chihiro Suzuki	NC (missed weight)	Rizin 43	June 24, 2023	1	2:59	Sapporo, Japan	Koike missed weight (145.88 lb) and was stripped of the Rizin Featherweight Championship. Only Suzuki was eligible to win the title. Originally a Submission (armbar) win for Erbst; overturned due to Koike missed weight.
Loss	31–6–1	Patrício Pitbull	Decision (unanimous)	Bellator MMA vs. Rizin	December 31, 2022	3	5:00	Saitama, Japan	Non-title bout.
Win	31–5–1	Juntaro Ushiku	Submission (triangle choke)	Rizin 39	October 23, 2022	2	1:29	Fukuoka, Japan	Won the Rizin Featherweight Championship.
Win	30–5–1	Kyohei Hagiwara	Submission (face crank)	Rizin Landmark 3	May 5, 2022	1	1:37	Tokyo, Japan	Catchweight (150 lb) bout.
Win	29–5–1	Ulka Sasaki	Submission (rear-naked choke)	Rizin Trigger 2	February 23, 2022	2	3:22	Fukuroi, Japan	
Win	28–5–1	Mikuru Asakura	Technical Submission (triangle choke)	Rizin 28	June 13, 2021	2	1:49	Tokyo, Japan	
Win	27–5–1	Kazumasa Majima	Submission (triangle choke)	Rizin 27	March 21, 2021	2	3:02	Nagoya, Japan	
Win	26–5–1	Kyle Aguon	Technical Submission (brabo choke)	Rizin 26	December 31, 2020	1	4:22	Saitama, Japan	
Win	25–5–1	Akiyo Nishiura	Submission (brabo choke)	ONE Japan Series: Road to Century	September 1, 2019	1	2:15	Tokyo, Japan	
Loss	24–5–1	Mateusz Gamrot	Decision (unanimous)	KSW 46: Narkun vs. Khalidov 2	December 1, 2018	5	5:00	Gliwice, Poland	For the vacant KSW Featherweight Championship.
Win	24–4–1	Marian Ziółkowski	Submission (armbar)	KSW 44: The Game	June 9, 2018	1	3:44	Gdańsk, Poland	Catchweight (150 lb) bout. Submission of the Night.
Win	23–4–1	Artur Sowiński	Submission (rear-naked choke)	KSW 41: Mankowski vs. Soldic	December 23, 2017	3	3:56	Katowice, Poland	Koike missed weight (148.2 lb) and was stripped of the KSW Featherweight Championship. Only Sowiński was eligible to win the title.
Win	22–4–1	Marcin Wrzosek	Decision (unanimous)	KSW 39: Colosseum	May 27, 2017	3	5:00	Warsaw, Poland	Won the KSW Featherweight Championship.
Win	21–4–1	Leszek Krakowski	Submission (triangle choke)	KSW 36: Materla vs. Palhares	October 1, 2016	1	4:24	Zielona Góra, Poland	Submission of the Night.
Win	20–4–1	George Hickman	Submission (triangle choke)	Rebel FC 4: Battle Royale Ascension	June 25, 2016	3	4:35	Qingdao, China	
Win	19–4–1	Yusuke Yachi	Submission (rear-naked choke)	Pancrase 277	April 24, 2016	3	0:37	Tokyo, Japan	
Loss	18–4–1	Artur Sowiński	Decision (unanimous)	KSW 33: Materla vs. Khalidov	November 28, 2015	3	5:00	Kraków, Poland	For the inaugural KSW Featherweight Championship. Fight of the Night.
Win	18–3–1	Miguel Torres	Submission (brabo choke)	Rebel FC 3: The Promised Ones	June 27, 2015	2	4:40	Qingdao, China	Won the Rebel FC Featherweight Tournament.
Win	17–3–1	Takahiro Ashida	Submission (triangle choke)	Rebel FC 3: The Promised Ones	June 27, 2015	1	3:06	Qingdao, China	Rebel FC Featherweight Tournament Semifinal.
Win	16–3–1	Anzor Azhiev	Submission (triangle choke)	KSW 30: Genesis	February 21, 2015	1	3:16	Poznań, Poland	Submission of the Night.
Win	15–3–1	Katsuyoshi Beppu	Submission (triangle choke)	Deep: Hamamatsu Impact 2014	September 14, 2014	3	1:29	Hamamatsu, Japan	
Win	14–3–1	Hideki Kadowaki	Submission (rear-naked choke)	DEEP: Cage Impact 2013	November 24, 2013	1	4:21	Tokyo, Japan	Return to Featherweight.
Win	13–3–1	Yutaka Ueda	TKO (punches)	Deep: Cage Impact 2013 in Hamamatsu	September 15, 2013	2	2:81	Hamamatsu, Japan	
Win	12–3–1	Liu Si Cong	Submission (triangle choke)	Real Fight MMA Championship 2	May 11, 2013	1	2:19	Zhengzhou, China	
Win	11–3–1	Albert Cheng	Submission (triangle choke)	Real Fight MMA Championship 1	December 1, 2012	1	4:00	Zhengzhou, China	
Win	10–3–1	Teppei Hori	Submission (triangle choke)	Rings: Vol. 2: Conquisito	September 23, 2012	1	2:40	Tokyo, Japan	
Win	9–3–1	Atsushi Ueda	Submission (armbar)	ZST: Battle Hazard 6	July 16, 2012	3	3:07	Tokyo, Japan	Lightweight debut.
Win	8–3–1	Yoshifumi Dogaki	Submission (armbar)	Heat 23	June 23, 2012	1	4:06	Kobe, Japan	
Win	7–3–1	Hidenobu Koike	Submission (triangle choke)	Deep: Cage Impact 2011 in Hamamatsu	September 18, 2011	1	2:16	Hamamatsu, Japan	
Win	6–3–1	Shinichiro Tanaka	Submission (triangle choke)	Deep: Shizuoka Impact 2011	February 6, 2011	1	3:18	Shizuoka, Japan	
Win	5–3–1	Yusuke Hoshiko	Decision (unanimous)	Heat 16	November 6, 2010	3	5:00	Osaka, Japan	
Draw	4–3–1	Mitsuru Yamaguchi	Draw (unanimous)	Deep: Cage Impact 2010 in Hamamatsu	September 19, 2010	2	5:00	Hamamatsu, Japan	
Loss	4–3	Toshiaki Kitada	Submission (armbar)	Deep: 44 Impact	October 10, 2009	2	0:56	Tokyo, Japan	
Win	4–2	Takashi Fujii	KO (head kick)	Deep: Hamamatsu Impact	September 27, 2009	1	2:40	Hamamatsu, Japan	
Loss	3–2	Yoshiro Maeda	DQ (knee to groin)	Deep: Osaka Impact	August 30, 2009	1	4:00	Osaka, Japan	Return to Featherweight.
Loss	3–1	Toshikazu Iseno	Decision (unanimous)	Deep: 42 Impact	June 30, 2009	2	5:00	Tokyo, Japan	Welterweight debut.
Win	3–0	Yasutomo Katsuki	Submission (rear-naked choke)	Heat: New Age Cup 1	February 8, 2009	1	3:28	Nagoya, Japan	
Win	2–0	Keizo Sakuragi	Submission (rear-naked choke)	Heat: New Age Cup 1	February 8, 2009	2	2:39	Nagoya, Japan	
Win	1–0	Masaki Wada	Submission (rear-naked choke)	Deep: clubDeep Hamamatsu	September 28, 2008	1	1:11	Hamamatsu, Japan	Featherweight debut.

== See also ==
- List of current Rizin FF fighters
- List of male mixed martial artists
