= Rafa Minato =

Brazilian politician (born 1996)

- Minato in 2026

Member of the Legislative Assembly of São Paulo
- Incumbent
- Assumed office 1 February 2027

Personal details
- Born: 19 March 1996 (age 30)
- Party: Mission Party

Rafael Francisco Ferraz Minatogawa (born 19 March 1996), better known as Rafa Minato, is a Brazilian politician who was elected member of the Legislative Assembly of São Paulo in 2026. From 2025 to 2026, he served as subprefect of Vila Mariana.
