= Minato Ward =

Minato Ward may refer to

- Minato, Tokyo
- Minato, Nagoya
- Minato, Osaka
