= Minato Shimbun =

Japanese newspaper

みなと新聞 The Minato Daily
- Type: Daily newspaper
- Owner(s): The Minato-Yamaguchi Co., Ltd.
- Founded: 1946
- Language: Japanese
- Headquarters: Shimonoseki
- Website: www.minato-yamaguchi.co.jp

The Minato Daily (みなと新聞, Minato Shinbun) is a Japanese-language daily newspaper published by The Minato-Yamaguchi Co., Ltd.

It is a professional Industrial economy newspaper focusing on the field of aquatic products industry.

== Corporate profile ==
=== The Minato-Yamaguchi Co., Ltd. ===
- Publishing newspapers : Minato Shimbun, Yamaguchi Shimbun, etc.

==== Location ====
- Shimonoseki Head Office

1-1-7, Higashi-Yamato-machi, Shimonoseki, Yamaguchi, Japan
