= Eikichi Minato =

Japanese politician

- 湊栄吉
- Born: April 14, 1894
- Died: 1978 (aged 83–84)
- Occupation: Politician

Eikichi Minato (湊栄吉, Minato Eikichi) was a Japanese politician. He served three terms as Mayor of Toyama City in Japan from 1959 to 1971.
