= Rizin Fighting Federation =

Japanese mixed martial arts organization

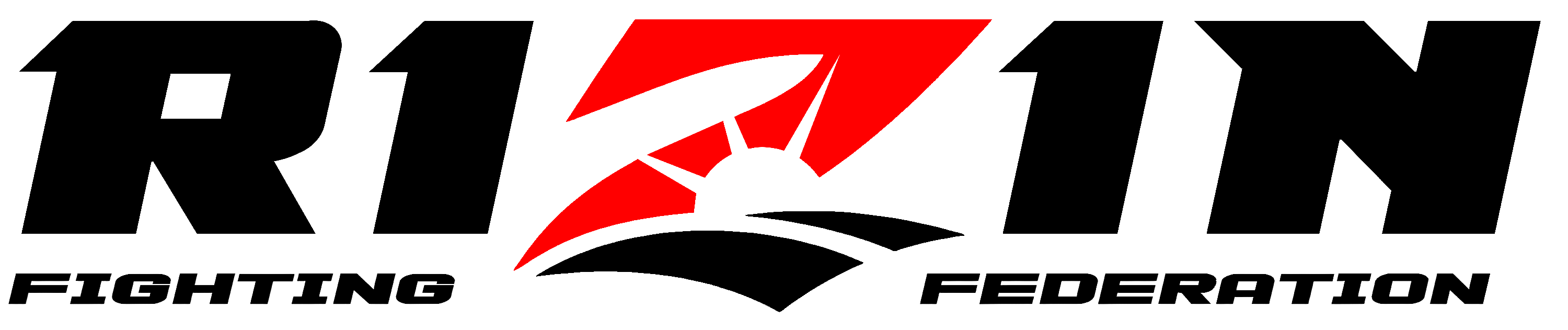
- Type: Private
- Industry: Mixed martial arts promotion
- Predecessor: Pride Fighting Championships; DREAM
- Founded: 2015; 11 years ago
- Founder: Nobuyuki Sakakibara
- Headquarters: Minato-ku, Tokyo, Japan
- Key people: Nobuyuki Sakakibara
- Parent: Dream Factory Worldwide
- Website: rizin.tv

Rizin Fighting Federation (stylised in all caps and also known as Rizin FF) is a Japanese mixed martial arts organization created in 2015 by the former Pride Fighting Championships and Dream Stage Entertainment president Nobuyuki Sakakibara.

Founded to be the spiritual successor of Pride FC, Hero's and Dream, Rizin carries much of the philosophy and ambition of its predecessors: its events are promoted as larger-than-life events with elaborate opening ceremonies and fighter entrances, its matches are fought in a roped ring and it has a ruleset inherited from Pride and Dream. Rizin also revived Pride's tradition of holding major events on New Year's Eve, beginning with its inaugural event in 2015, and has continued to hold New Year's Eve cards in subsequent years. The organization also promotes "Grand Prix", single-elimination tournaments where fighters have to fight multiple opponents in the same night. Rizin is considered Japan's top MMA promotion.

Besides MMA, Rizin events also occasionally contain other combat sport bouts, the promotion promoted kickboxing — with two "Grand Prix" tournaments in 2017 and 2021. — submission grappling, boxing and bare-knuckle boxing matches.

The promotion's name is a combination of "Raijin", the Japanese god of lightning; the word "rising", meaning "to prosper and thrive"; and the letter, 'Z', meaning "ultimate".

== History ==
=== Background and formation ===
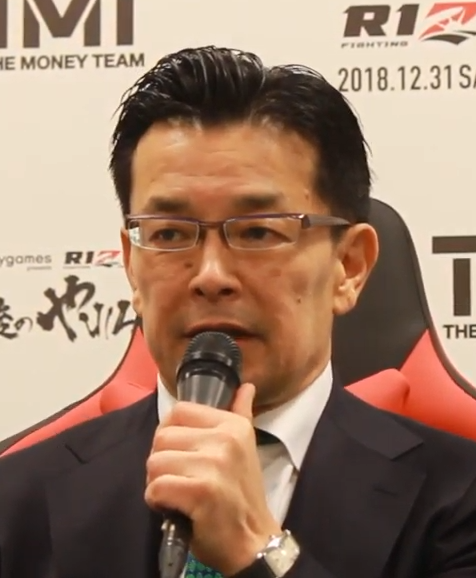
Rizin founder Nobuyuki Sakakibara

In 1997, Pride Fighting Championships was founded in Japan, promoted by Dream Stage Entertainment. The organization quickly rose up to become the world's most popular MMA promotion and helped to popularize the sport in Japan and in the world. Pride differentiated itself from the UFC with its focus on spectacle and entertainment, as well a more permissive ruleset. By 2007, a scandal alleging its ties to the yakuza caused a financial decline that led to the promotion folding. Dream Stage Entertainment was bought by Zuffa—UFC's holding company—which initially promised to keep the event running. However, Zuffa would lay off most of Pride's staff with several Pride fighters moving to the UFC.

After Pride folded, most of DSE's former staff, fighters and executives joined Fighting and Entertainment Group, the promoters of K-1, to organize a successor, which became known as Dream. However, FEG would have its own financial issues and went bankrupt in 2012. As a result, Dream became defunct.

Three years after Dream folded, rumors began circulating that Pride and Dream founder Nobuyuki Sakakibara would return to the industry after an interview with Bellator MMA President Scott Coker was released. On September 19, 2015, during Bellator MMA & Glory: Dynamite 1, it was announced that Sakakibara had signed former Pride Heavyweight Champion Fedor Emelianenko to headline a New Year's Eve Show in Tokyo for his new MMA promotion. Sakakibara held a press conference on October 8, 2015, with Nobuhiko Takada and other former Pride FC employees to formally announce the launch of "Rizin Fighting Federation". Initial signees included Kazushi Sakuraba, Shinya Aoki, as well as female competitors Gabi Garcia and Rena Kubota.

A Grand Prix tournament was announced (held at 100 kg or roughly 220 lbs), with champions and competitors from Bellator, KSW, Jungle Fight, BAMMA, and King of Kings. Most notably, King Mo was announced to represent Bellator in the tournament. The 8-man bracket was officially finalized on November 30, 2015, with other bouts also being announced shortly thereafter. Kron Gracie (whose father Rickson competed at the inaugural PRIDE event) was announced to participate against Asen Yamamoto. Amongst the veterans in the Japanese scene, Tsuyoshi Kosaka would face James Thompson, and Akebono Tarō would face Bob Sapp.

Initial plans were to do at least four events per year, as opposed to the more frequent scheduling of other promotions, in order to build up the excitement and anticipation. Rizin's presentation is modeled after major sporting events, such as the UEFA Champions League and FIFA World Cup.

=== 2018–present ===
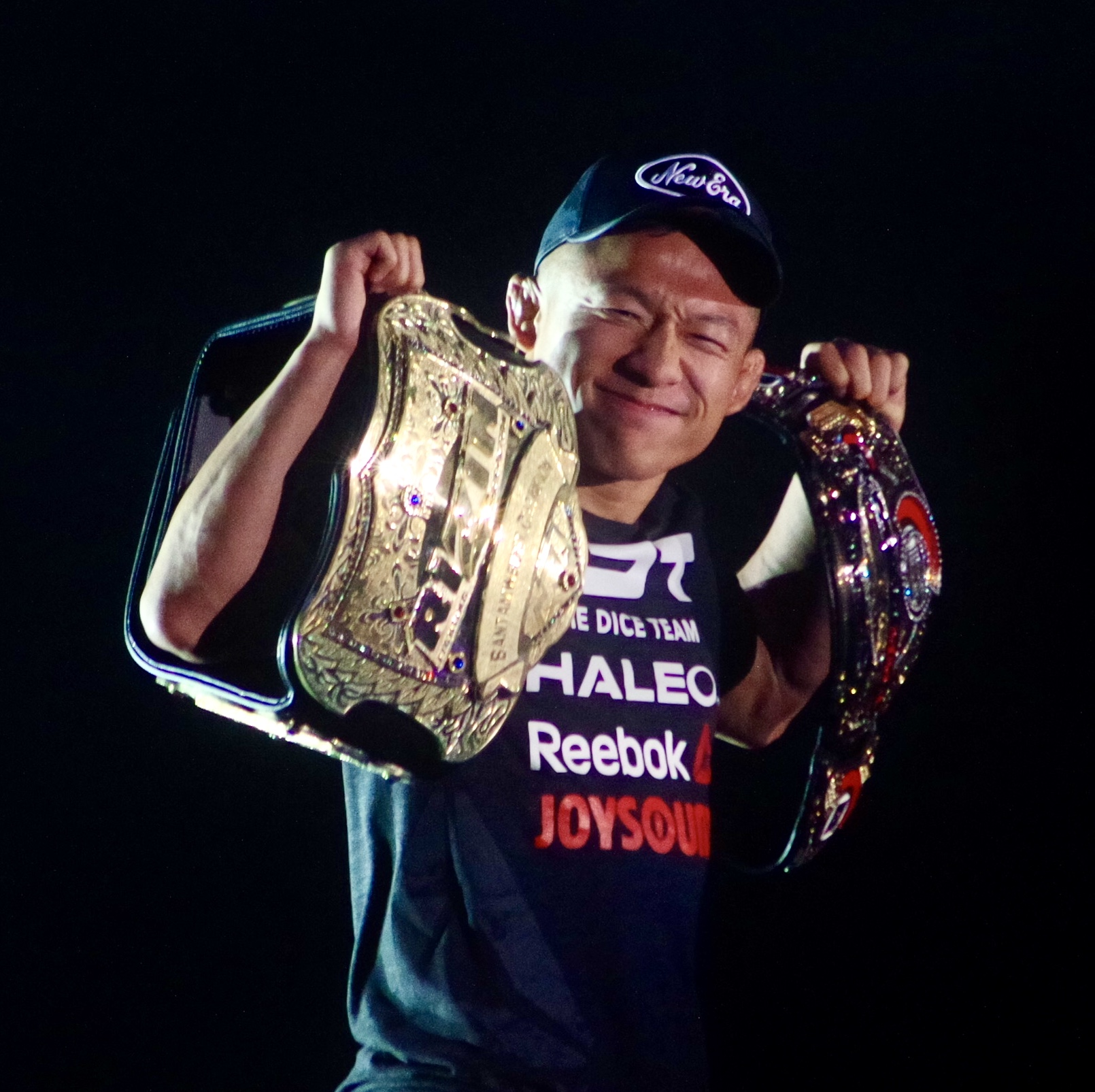
Former Rizin two-division champion Kyoji Horiguchi

In 2018, it was announced that the main event for the traditional New Year's Eve card (Rizin 14) was going to be a boxing match between Floyd Mayweather Jr. and undefeated Japanese kickboxer Tenshin Nasukawa. The match ended up with Nasukawa knocked out two minutes into the first round.

Rizin Trigger 1st, on November 11, 2021, would be Rizin's first event in which matches would take place inside a cage, instead of the traditional roped ring. Rizin CEO Nobuyuki Sakakibara said the change was intended in part to give Rizin fighters experience competing in a cage, as many fighters sought opportunities to compete overseas, where cages were more common. The TRIGGER series was subsequently established as a cage-based series, with TRIGGER 2nd held on February 23, 2022, and TRIGGER 3rd on April 16, 2022.

In Summer 2022, Sakakibara would produce the Tenshin Nasukawa vs. Takeru PPV broadcast (known as "THE MATCH 2022"), with the broadcast using Rizin's on-air graphics and visual presentation. Mayweather would return to Rizin that September to co-promote (via The Money Team) and headline the inaugural Super Rizin card.

On December 31, 2022, as the traditional New Year's Eve event, Rizin hosted a crossover Bellator vs Rizin card with Bellator MMA as part of Rizin 40. The card saw fighters from each promotion fight each other. The card saw Bellator MMA fighters Gadzhi Rabadanov, former champions A.J. McKee, Juan Archuleta and Kyoji Horiguchi, and current champion Patricio Freire, fighting against Rizin representatives Koji Takeda, Soo Chul Kim, Hiromasa Ougikubo and champions Kleber Koike Erbst and Roberto de Souza. All five Bellator representatives would win their matches in a clean sweep. During the event, former boxing world champion Manny Pacquiao made a public announcement that he had signed with Rizin for a boxing exhibition match against a yet-unannounced opponent.

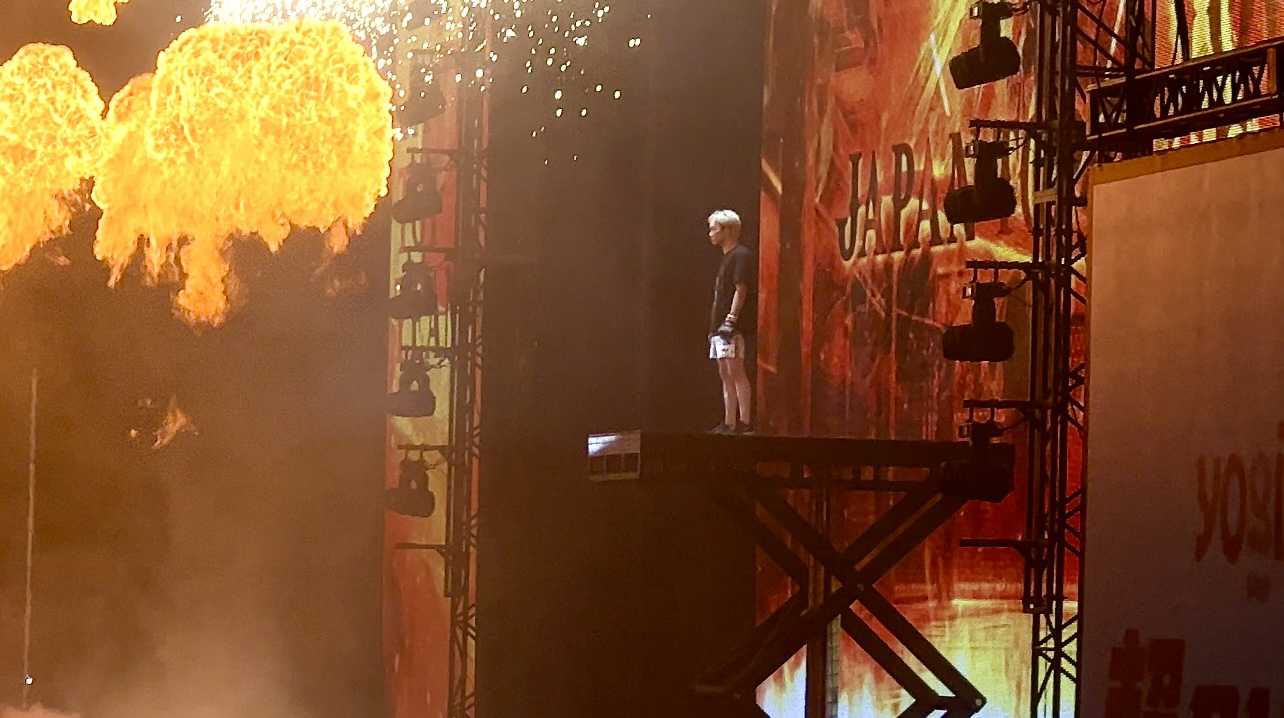
Mikuru Asakura in one of RIZIN's elaborate entrances

During the Super Rizin 2 card on July 30, 2023, the promotion announced their first international event, Rizin Landmark 7, to take place in Azerbaijan on November 4. It will also be the first major MMA event to take place in the country.

In June 2024, Rizin announced a partnership with Bare Knuckle Fighting Championship (BKFC), which both companies would allow talent fight in each other's organizations in bareknuckle bouts. At Super Rizin 3 on July 28, 2024, Charisa Sigal, Tai Emery, Takaki Soya, and John Dodson all fought in bare-knucking bouts on the undercard.

In 2026, Rizin Fighting Federation entered into a cross-promotional partnership with the Professional Fighters League (PFL), allowing fighters from the two organizations to compete in bouts promoted jointly by both promotions. The partnership was showcased at Super RIZIN 5, held on September 10, 2026, at the Kyocera Dome Osaka in Osaka, Japan, attracting an attendance of nearly 49,000 spectators. Where RIZIN Featherweight Champion Razhabali Shaydullaev faced PFL Featherweight Champion A. J. McKee in a title unification bout contested for both featherweight championships. Shaydullaev defeated McKee by unanimous decision to become the simultaneous RIZIN and PFL Featherweight Champion. The event also featured the return of former ONE Lightweight Champion Shinya Aoki to RIZIN, where he faced Mikuru Asakura, as well as bouts involving several prominent RIZIN fighters.

== Broadcasting and coverage ==
Rizin's inaugural event was broadcast in North America on Spike TV. Other broadcasters have included SKY Perfect JSAT Corporation, Fuji Television, Fox Sports Brazil, Kix and Match TV. From 2017 to 2020, Rizin events have been streaming on FITE TV in North America and Europe. Rizin 26 to Rizin 37 would stream on LIVENow in Europe and North America.

In 2022, due to several controversies, Rizin would be dropped by Fuji by May of that year. Rizin would since begin broadcasting on events via PPV on their streaming service, RIZIN STREAM PASS, and various other streaming platforms in Japan.

Starting with Super Rizin & Rizin 38 in 2022, Integrated Sports would produce English-language PPVs of Rizin events for FITE.

In February 2024, Rizin announced the launch of a new international service, RIZIN.tv. From March, the service will be subscription-based, and will include past events.

== Weight classes ==
Weight class name	Upper limit	Gender
Atomweight	47 kg (103.6 lb)	Female
Super Atomweight	49 kg (108.0 lb)	Female
Light Flyweight	53 kg (116.8 lb)	Female
Flyweight	57 kg (125.7 lb)	Male
Bantamweight	61 kg (134.5 lb)	Male
Featherweight	66 kg (145.5 lb)	Male
Lightweight	71 kg (156.5 lb)	Male
Welterweight	77 kg (169.8 lb)	Male
Middleweight	85 kg (187.4 lb)	Male
Light Heavyweight	93 kg (205.0 lb)	Male
Heavyweight	120 kg (264.6 lb)	Male
Openweight	No weight restriction	Male / Female

== Rules ==
=== Mixed martial arts ===
The rules in Rizin FF have been adopted from Pride FC with some slight modifications over the years. Matches are three rounds in length. Prior to May 2018, the first round of men's matches spanned 10 minutes, while the final two rounds lasted five minutes each. Since then matches have been three rounds of five minutes each. Victory can be attained by knockout, submission, technical knockout by referee stoppage, or by judges' decision.

All strikes, throws and chokes are permitted, with the exception of headbutts and strikes to the back of the head, medulla oblongata, spinal cord or genitals. Soccer kicks, knees and stomps to grounded opponents are also permitted. However, if there is a weight discrepancy of 15 kg (33 lb) or more, the lighter fighter is allowed to choose if such ground attacks are permitted. Unlike Pride, Rizin allows the use of elbow strikes, including the 12–6 elbow.

==== Judging criteria ====
Fights are judged on the following criteria:

- Damage: when assessing damage, both striking and grappling are given the same weight. The judges will place value on the extent to which the effective striking or grappling 'influences the match' - in other words, whether there was such damage/advantage to the fighter which would have led to the fight being ended by the opponent tapping out or being knocked out.
- Aggressiveness: the judges will consider which fighter was more effective in delivering attacks which may end the fight in a finish. Note this element does not take into consideration the actual impact of damage caused by the fighter's strikes, throws or submission. Rather, the judges will place value on whether fighters were aggressive and proactive in their approach during the fight.
- Generalship: the judges will consider which fighter was more effective in dominating the pace, place and position of the fight. Judges will also consider the amount of time spent in a ground position or the standing position.

Although not outlined in the Rizin rules, scorecards published on the JMOC website suggest that damage, aggressiveness and generalship are scored 50, 30 and 20 points respectively. Where the fighter has not fulfilled the element, they are given a score of zero - there are no in-betweens.

=== Kickboxing ===
Rizin kickboxing matches are three rounds of three minutes each. Victory can be attained by knockout, technical knockout by referee stoppage, or by judges' decision. If the match goes the distance, a 10-point system is used to judge. Three knockdowns in a single round will result in a technical knockout. All forms of elbow strikes are illegal.

== List of Rizin FF events ==
#	Event	Date	Venue	Location	Attendance
85	Rizin 55	November 8, 2026	LaLa Arena Tokyo-Bay	Funabashi, Japan	
84	Rizin Landmark 16	October 3, 2026	Happiness Arena	Nagasaki, Japan	
83	Super Rizin 5	September 10, 2026	Kyocera Dome Osaka	Osaka, Japan	
82	Rizin 54	August 11, 2026	Toyota Arena Tokyo	Tokyo, Japan	
81	Rizin Landmark 15	July 18, 2026	Hiroshima Prefectural Sports Center	Hiroshima, Japan	
80	Rizin Landmark 14	June 6, 2026	Xebio Arena Sendai	Sendai, Japan	
79	Rizin 53	May 10, 2026	Glion Arena Kobe	Kobe, Japan	
78	Rizin Landmark 13	April 12, 2026	Fukuoka Convention Center	Fukuoka, Japan	
77	Rizin 52	March 8, 2026	Ariake Arena	Tokyo, Japan	
76	Rizin: Shiwasu no Cho Tsuwamono Matsuri	December 31, 2025	Saitama Super Arena	Saitama, Japan	
75	Rizin Landmark 12	November 3, 2025	Glion Arena Kobe	Kobe, Japan	
74	Rizin 51	September 28, 2025	IG Arena (Aichi International Arena)	Nagoya, Japan	17,000
73	Super Rizin 4: Midsummer Fight Festival	July 27, 2025	Saitama Super Arena	Saitama, Japan	43,965
72	Rizin Landmark 11	June 14, 2025	Makomanai Ice Arena	Sapporo, Japan	
71	Rizin World Series in Korea	May 31, 2025	Paradise City	Incheon, South Korea	
70	Rizin: Otoko Matsuri	May 4, 2025	Tokyo Dome	Tokyo, Japan	42,706
69	Rizin 50	March 30, 2025	Anabuki Arena Kagawa	Takamatsu, Japan	9,020
68	Rizin 49	December 31, 2024	Saitama Super Arena	Saitama, Japan	23,012
67	Rizin Landmark 10	November 17, 2024	Nagoya International Exhibition Hall	Nagoya, Japan	7,918
66	Rizin 48	September 29, 2024	Saitama Super Arena	Saitama, Japan	11,247
65	Super Rizin 3	July 28, 2024	Saitama Super Arena	Saitama, Japan	48,117
64	Rizin 47	June 9, 2024	Yoyogi National Stadium	Tokyo, Japan	12,576
63	Rizin 46	April 29, 2024	Ariake Arena	Tokyo, Japan	
62	Rizin Landmark 9	March 23, 2024	World Memorial Hall	Kobe, Hyōgo, Japan	8,498
61	Rizin Landmark 8	February 24, 2024	Saga Arena	Saga, Japan	7,758
60	Rizin 45	December 31, 2023	Saitama Super Arena	Saitama, Japan	23,013
59	Rizin Landmark 7	November 4, 2023	National Gymnastics Arena	Baku, Azerbaijan	
58	Rizin Landmark 6	October 1, 2023	Dolphins Arena	Nagoya, Aichi, Japan	7,017
57	Rizin 44	September 24, 2023	Saitama Super Arena	Saitama, Japan	11,681
56	Super Rizin 2: Rizin X Bellator	July 30, 2023	Saitama Super Arena	Saitama, Japan	24,264
55	Rizin 43 – Sapporo	June 24, 2023	Makomanai Ice Arena	Sapporo, Hokkaido, Japan	8,510
54	Rizin 42	May 6, 2023	Ariake Arena	Tokyo, Japan	14,930
53	Rizin Landmark 5	April 29, 2023	Yoyogi National Gymnasium	Tokyo, Japan	13,837
52	Rizin 41 – Osaka	April 1, 2023	Maruzen Intec Arena	Osaka, Japan	9,987
51	Rizin 40 & Rizin vs Bellator	December 31, 2022	Saitama Super Arena	Saitama, Japan	23,661
50	Rizin Landmark 4	November 6, 2022	Dolphins Arena	Nagoya, Aichi, Japan	
49	Rizin 39	October 23, 2022	Marine Messe Fukuoka	Fukuoka, Japan	
48	Super Rizin & Rizin 38	September 25, 2022	Saitama Super Arena	Saitama, Saitama, Japan	23,105
47	Rizin 37 - Saitama	July 31, 2022	Saitama Super Arena	Saitama, Saitama, Japan	11,166
46	Rizin 36 - Okinawa	July 7, 2022	Okinawa Arena	Okinawa, Japan	7,264
45	The Match 2022	June 19, 2022	Tokyo Dome	Tokyo, Japan	56,399
44	Rizin Landmark 3	May 5, 2022	—N/a	Japan	—N/a
43	Rizin 35	April 17, 2022	Musashino Forest Sport Plaza	Chōfu, Tokyo, Japan	8,935
42	Rizin Trigger 3	April 16, 2022	Musashino Forest Sport Plaza	Chōfu, Tokyo, Japan	6,515
41	Rizin 34 – Osaka	March 20, 2022	Maruzen Intec Arena	Osaka, Japan	22,449
40	Rizin Landmark 2	March 6, 2022	—N/a	Japan	—N/a
39	Rizin Trigger 2	February 23, 2022	Ecopa Arena	Fukuroi, Shizuoka, Japan	—N/a
38	Rizin 33 - Saitama	December 31, 2021	Saitama Super Arena	Saitama, Japan	22,499
37	Rizin Trigger 1	November 28, 2021	World Memorial Hall	Kobe, Hyōgo, Japan	4,025
36	Rizin 32 - Okinawa	November 20, 2021	Okinawa Arena	Okinawa, Japan	4,771
35	Rizin 31 - Yokohama	October 24, 2021	Pia Arena MM	Yokohama, Kanagawa, Japan	7,580
34	Rizin Landmark Vol. 1	October 2, 2021	—N/a	Tokyo, Japan	~90
33	Rizin 30 – Saitama	September 19, 2021	Saitama Super Arena	Saitama, Japan	7,580
32	Rizin 29 – Osaka	June 27, 2021	Maruzen Intec Arena	Osaka, Japan	4,796
31	Rizin 28 – Tokyo	June 13, 2021	Tokyo Dome	Tokyo, Japan	9,317
30	Rizin 27 – Nagoya	March 21, 2021	Nippon Gaishi Hall	Nagoya, Aichi, Japan	4,558
29	Rizin 26 – Saitama	December 31, 2020	Saitama Super Arena	Saitama, Japan	9,978
28	Rizin 25 – Osaka	November 21, 2020	Osaka-jō Hall	Osaka, Japan	5,487
27	Rizin 24 – Saitama	September 27, 2020	Saitama Super Arena	Saitama, Japan	5,000
26	Rizin 23 - Calling Over	August 10, 2020	Pia Arena MM	Yokohama, Kanagawa, Japan	4,410
25	Rizin 22 - Starting Over	August 9, 2020	Pia Arena MM	Yokohama, Kanagawa, Japan	2,805
24	Rizin 21 - Hamamatsu	February 22, 2020	Hamamatsu Arena	Hamamatsu, Shizuoka, Japan	6,832
23	Rizin 20 - Saitama	December 31, 2019	Saitama Super Arena	Saitama, Japan	29,315
22	Rizin 19 - Osaka	October 12, 2019	Edition Arena	Osaka, Japan	5,098
21	Rizin 18 - Nagoya	August 18, 2019	Aichi Prefectural Gymnasium	Nagoya, Aichi, Japan	6,281
20	Rizin 17 - Saitama	July 28, 2019	Saitama Super Arena	Saitama, Saitama, Japan	16,930
19	Rizin 16 - Kobe	June 2, 2019	World Memorial Hall	Kobe, Hyōgo, Japan	8,107
18	Rizin 15 - Yokohama	April 21, 2019	Yokohama Arena	Yokohama, Kanagawa, Japan	12,914
17	Rizin 14 - Saitama	December 31, 2018	Saitama Super Arena	Saitama, Japan	29,105
16	Rizin - Heisei's Last Yarennoka!	December 31, 2018	Saitama Super Arena	Saitama, Japan	7,498
15	Rizin 13 - Saitama	September 30, 2018	Saitama Super Arena	Saitama, Japan	27,208
14	Rizin 12 - Aichi - Ken	August 12, 2018	Aichi Prefectural Gymnasium	Nagoya, Aichi, Japan	5,567
13	Rizin 11 - Saitama	July 29, 2018	Saitama Super Arena	Saitama, Japan	17,912
12	Rizin 10 - Fukuoka	May 6, 2018	Marine Messe Fukuoka	Fukuoka, Japan	7,910
11	Rizin World Grand Prix 2017: Final Round	December 31, 2017	Saitama Super Arena	Saitama, Japan	18,316
10	Rizin World Grand Prix 2017: 2nd Round	December 29, 2017	Saitama Super Arena	Saitama, Japan	15,539
9	Rizin World Grand Prix 2017: Opening Round - Part 2	October 15, 2017	Marine Messe Fukuoka	Fukuoka, Japan	7,732
8	Rizin World Grand Prix 2017: Opening Round - Part 1	July 30, 2017	Saitama Super Arena	Saitama, Japan	17,730
7	Rizin 2017 in Yokohama: Sakura	April 16, 2017	Yokohama Arena	Yokohama, Kanagawa, Japan	12,729
6	Rizin World Grand Prix 2016: Final Round	December 31, 2016	Saitama Super Arena	Saitama, Japan	19,357
5	Rizin World Grand Prix 2016: 2nd Round	December 29, 2016	Saitama Super Arena	Saitama, Japan	16,642
4	Rizin World Grand Prix 2016: 1st Round	September 25, 2016	Saitama Super Arena	Saitama, Japan	15,011
3	Rizin 1	April 17, 2016	Nippon Gaishi Hall	Nagoya, Aichi, Japan	7,291
2	Rizin World Grand Prix 2015: Part 2 - Iza	December 31, 2015	Saitama Super Arena	Saitama, Japan	18,365
1	Rizin World Grand Prix 2015: Part 1 - Saraba	December 29, 2015	Saitama Super Arena	Saitama, Japan	12,214

== Current champions ==
Division	Champion	Since	Defenses
Lightweight	(Brazil) Luiz Gustavo	May 10, 2026	0
Featherweight	(Kyrgyzstan) Razhabali Shaydullaev	May 4, 2025	4
Bantamweight	(United States) Danny Sabatello	Dec 31, 2025	2
Flyweight	(Canada) Tony Laramie	Nov 8, 2026	0
Women's Super Atomweight	Vacant	-	–

== Championship history ==
=== Light Heavyweight Championship ===
Weight limit: 93 kg (205.0 lb)

No.	Name	Event	Date	Reign (total)	Defenses
1	(Czech Republic) Jiří Procházka def. Muhammed Lawal	Rizin 15; Yokohama, Japan	Apr 21, 2019	269 days	1. def. C. B. Dollaway at Rizin 20 on Dec 31, 2019
Procházka vacated the title on January 15, 2020 after he signed with UFC.

=== Lightweight Championship ===
Weight limit: 71 kg (156.5 lb)

No.	Name	Event	Date	Reign (total)	Defenses
1	(Brazil) Roberto de Souza def. Tofiq Musayev	Rizin 28; Tokyo, Japan	Jun 13, 2021	1,162 days	1. def. Yusuke Yachi at Rizin 33 on Dec 31, 2021; 2. def. Johnny Case at Rizin 35 on Apr 17, 2022; 3. def. Luiz Gustavo at Rizin 48 on Sep 29, 2024; 4. def. Vugar Karamov at Rizin 49 on Dec 31, 2024; 5. def. Yoshinori Horie at Rizin 51 on Sep 28, 2025
2	(Uzbekistan) Ilkhom Nozimov	Rizin: Shiwasu no Cho Tsuwamono Matsuri; Saitama, Japan	Dec 31, 2025	130 days	
3	(Brazil) Luiz Gustavo	Rizin 53; Kobe, Japan	May 10, 2026	188 days (incumbent)	

=== Featherweight Championship ===
Weight limit: 66 kg (145.5 lb)

No.	Name	Event	Date	Reign (total)	Defenses
1	(Japan) Yutaka Saito def. Mikuru Asakura	Rizin 25; Osaka, Japan	Nov 21, 2020	337 days	
2	(Japan) Juntaro Ushiku	Rizin 31; Yokohama, Japan	Oct 24, 2021	364 days	1. def. Yutaka Saito at Rizin 35 on Apr 17, 2022
3	(Japan) Kleber Koike Erbst	Rizin 39; Fukuoka, Japan	Oct 23, 2022	243 days	
Koike was stripped of the title on June 23, 2023 after failing to make weight for his title defense against Chihiro Suzuki at Rizin 43.
4	(Azerbaijan) Vugar Karamov def. Mikuru Asakura	Super Rizin 2 Saitama, Japan	Jul 30, 2023	97 days	
5	(Japan) Chihiro Suzuki	Rizin Landmark 7 Baku, Azerbaijan	Nov 4, 2023	423 days	1. def. Masanori Kanehara at Rizin 46 on Apr 29, 2024
6	(Japan) Kleber Koike Erbst (2)	Rizin 49; Saitama, Japan	Dec 31, 2024	124 days (367 days)	
7	(Kyrgyzstan) Razhabali Shaydullaev	Rizin: Otoko Matsuri; Tokyo, Japan	May 4, 2025	559 days (incumbent)	1. def. Viktor Kolesnik at Rizin 51 on Sep 28, 2025; 2. def. Mikuru Asakura at Rizin: Shiwasu no Cho Tsuwamono Matsuri on Dec 31, 2025; 3. def. Yuta Kubo at Rizin Landmark 13 on Apr 12, 2026; 4. def. A. J. McKee at Super Rizin 5 on Sep 10, 2026

=== Bantamweight Championship ===
Weight limit: 61 kg (134.5 lb)

No.	Name	Event	Date	Reign (total)	Defenses
1	(Japan) Kyoji Horiguchi def. Darrion Caldwell	Rizin 14; Saitama, Japan	Dec 31, 2018	318 days	
Horiguchi vacated the title on November 14, 2019 after he was unable to defend the title due to injury.
2	(Portugal) Manel Kape def. Kai Asakura	Rizin 20; Saitama, Japan	Dec 31, 2019	92 days	
Kape vacated the title on April 1, 2020 after he signed with the UFC.
3	(Japan) Kai Asakura def. Hiromasa Ougikubo	Rizin 23; Yokohama, Japan	Aug 10, 2020	143 days	
4	(Japan) Kyoji Horiguchi (2)	Rizin 26; Saitama, Japan	Dec 31, 2020	730 days (1,048 days)	
Horiguchi vacated the title on December 31, 2022 after he moved down to Flyweight.
5	(United States) Juan Archuleta def. Hiromasa Ougikubo	Super Rizin 2 Saitama, Japan	Jul 30, 2023	154 days	
Archuleta was stripped of the title on December 31, 2023 after failing to make weight for his title defense against Kai Asakura at Rizin 45.
6	(Japan) Kai Asakura (2) def. Juan Archuleta	Rizin 45; Saitama, Japan	Dec 31, 2023	161 days (304 days)	
Asakura vacated the title on June 9, 2024, when he signed with the Ultimate Fighting Championship.
7	(Japan) Naoki Inoue def. Soo Chul Kim	Rizin 48; Saitama, Japan	Sep 29, 2024	458 days	1. def. Yuki Motoya at Rizin 50 on Mar 30, 2025; 2. def. Ryuya Fukuda at Super Rizin 4 on Jul 27, 2025
8	(United States) Danny Sabatello	Rizin: Shiwasu no Cho Tsuwamono Matsuri; Saitama, Japan	Dec 31, 2025	318 days (incumbent)	1. def. Joji Goto at Rizin Landmark 13 on Apr 11, 2026; 2. def. Jinnosuke Kashimura at Rizin Landmark 15 on Jul 18, 2026

=== Flyweight Championship ===
Weight limit: 57 kg (125.7 lb)

No.	Name	Event	Date	Reign (total)	Defenses
1	(Japan) Kyoji Horiguchi def. Makoto Takahashi	Rizin 45; Saitama, Japan	Dec 31, 2023	455 days	1. def. Nkazimulo Zulu at Rizin 49 on Dec 31, 2024
Horiguchi vacated the title on March 30, 2025, when he re-signed with the Ultimate Fighting Championship.
2	(Japan) Hiromasa Ougikubo def. Yuki Motoya	Rizin: Shiwasu no Cho Tsuwamono Matsuri; Saitama, Japan	Dec 31, 2025	157 days	
3	(Japan) Makoto Takahashi	Rizin Landmark 14; Sendai, Japan	Jun 6, 2026	155 days	
4	(Canada) Tony Laramie	Rizin 55; Funabashi, Japan	Nov 8, 2026	6 days (incumbent)	

=== Women's Super Atomweight Championship ===
Weight limit: 49 kg (108.0 lb)

No.	Name	Event	Date	Reign (total)	Defenses
1	(Japan) Ayaka Hamasaki def. Kanna Asakura	Rizin 14; Saitama, Japan	Dec 31, 2018	365 days	1. def. Jinh Yu Frey at Rizin 16 on Jun 2, 2019
2	(South Korea) Ham Seo-hee	Rizin 20; Saitama, Japan	Dec 31, 2019	290 days	
Ham vacated her title on October 16, 2020 after being unable to agree on her next fight with the organization and signed with ONE Championship.
3	(Japan) Ayaka Hamasaki (2) def. Miyuu Yamamoto	Rizin 26; Saitama, Japan	Dec 31, 2020	2,144 days (1,957 days)	1. def. Kanna Asakura at Rizin 27 on Mar 21, 2021
4	(Japan) Seika Izawa	Rizin 35; Chōfu, Japan	Apr 17, 2022	1,456 days	1. def. Claire Lopez at Super Rizin 2 on Jul 30, 2023; 2. def. Saori Oshima at Rizin Landmark 12 on Nov 3, 2025; 3. def. Rena Kubota at Rizin: Shiwasu no Cho Tsuwamono Matsuri on Dec 31, 2025
Izawa vacated the title on April 12, 2026, after announcing her pregnancy during Rizin Landmark 13.

== Grand-Prix Champions ==
=== Mixed martial arts ===
Event	Date	Division	Winner	Runner-up
Rizin World Grand Prix 2015: Part 2 - Iza	Dec 31, 2015	100 kg	(United States) Muhammed Lawal	(Czech Republic) Jiří Procházka
Rizin World Grand Prix 2016: Final Round	Dec 31, 2016	Openweight	(Croatia) Mirko Cro Cop	(Iran) Amir Aliakbari
Rizin World Grand Prix 2017: Final Round	Dec 31, 2017	Bantamweight	(Japan) Kyoji Horiguchi	(Japan) Shintaro Ishiwatari
Rizin World Grand Prix 2017: Final Round	Dec 31, 2017	Women's Super Atomweight	(Japan) Kanna Asakura	(Japan) Rena Kubota
Rizin 20	Dec 31, 2019	Lightweight	(Azerbaijan) Tofiq Musayev	(Brazil) Patricky Pitbull
Rizin 33	Dec 31, 2021	Japan Bantamweight	(Japan) Hiromasa Ougikubo	(Japan) Kai Asakura
Rizin 40	Dec 31, 2022	Women's Super Atomweight	(Japan) Seika Izawa	(South Korea) Park Si-woo
Rizin 51	Sep 28, 2025	Heavyweight	(Germany) Alexander Soldatkin	(Poland) Marek Samociuk

=== Kickboxing ===
Event	Date	Division	Winner	Runner-up
Rizin World Grand Prix 2017: Final Round	Dec 31, 2017	Flyweight	(Japan) Tenshin Nasukawa	(Japan) Yamato Fujita
Rizin 29	Jun 27, 2021	Bantamweight	(Japan) Taiju Shiratori	(Japan) Kouzi

== Records ==
=== Most wins in title bouts ===
Title wins	Champion	Division	W	D	NC	L
6	(Brazil) Roberto de Souza	Lightweight	6	0	0	1
5	(Kyrgyzstan) Razhabali Shaydullaev	Featherweight	5	0	0	0
4	(Japan) Ayaka Hamasaki	Super Atomweight	4	0	0	2
4	(Japan) Kyoji Horiguchi	Bantamweight; Flyweight	2; 2	0; 0	0; 0	0; 0
4	(Japan) Seika Izawa	Super Atomweight	4	0	0	0
3	(Japan) Naoki Inoue	Bantamweight	3	0	0	1
3	(United States) Danny Sabatello	Bantamweight	3	0	0	0
2	(Japan) Kai Asakura	Bantamweight	2	0	0	2
2	(Japan) Juntaro Ushiku	Featherweight	2	0	0	1
2	(Japan) Chihiro Suzuki	Featherweight	2	0	1	1
2	(Japan) Kleber Koike Erbst	Featherweight	2	0	1	1

=== Most consecutive title defenses ===
Defenses	Champion	Division	Period
5	(Brazil) Roberto de Souza	Lightweight	Jun 13, 2021 – Dec 31, 2025
4	(Kyrgyzstan) Razhabali Shaydullaev	Featherweight	May 4, 2025 – present
3	(Japan) Seika Izawa	Women's Super Atomweight	Apr 17, 2022 – Apr 12, 2026
2	(Japan) Naoki Inoue	Bantamweight	Sep 29, 2024 – Dec 31, 2025
2	(United States) Danny Sabatello	Bantamweight	Dec 31, 2025 – present
1	(Japan) Ayaka Hamasaki	Women's Super Atomweight	Dec 31, 2018 – Dec 31, 2019
1	(Czech Republic) Jiří Procházka	Light Heavyweight	Apr 21, 2019 – Jan 15, 2020
1	(Japan) Ayaka Hamasaki	Women's Super Atomweight	Dec 31, 2020 – Apr 17, 2022
1	(Japan) Juntaro Ushiku	Featherweight	Oct 24, 2021 – Oct 23, 2022
1	(Japan) Chihiro Suzuki	Featherweight	Nov 4, 2023 – Dec 31, 2024
1	(Japan) Kyoji Horiguchi	Flyweight	Dec 31, 2023 – Mar 30, 2025

=== Multi-division champions ===
Interim title

No.	Champion	Division	Won	Lost	Defenses	Reign	Total Reign
1	(Japan) Kyoji Horiguchi	Bantamweight	Dec 31, 2018 (Rizin 14)	Nov 14, 2019 (vacated)	0	318 days	2097 days
1	(Japan) Kyoji Horiguchi	Bantamweight	Dec 31, 2020 (Rizin 26)	Dec 31, 2022 (vacated)	0	730 days	2097 days
1	(Japan) Kyoji Horiguchi	Flyweight	Dec 31, 2023 (Rizin 45)	Mar 30, 2025 (vacated)	1	455 days	2097 days

== Champions by nationality ==
The division champions include only linear and true champions. Interim champions who have never become linear champions will be listed as interim champions. Fighters with multiple title reigns in a specific division will also be counted once. Runners-up are not included in tournaments champions.

Country	Division champions	Interim champions	Tournaments champions	Total
Japan	9	-	4	13
United States	2	-	1	3
Brazil	2	-	-	2
Azerbaijan	1	-	1	2
Czech Republic	1	-	-	1
Portugal	1	-	-	1
South Korea	1	-	-	1
Kyrgyzstan	1	-	-	1
Uzbekistan	1	-	-	1
Canada	1	-	-	1
Croatia	-	-	1	1
Germany	-	-	1	1

== Notable fighters ==
- (United States) Floyd Mayweather Jr.
- (Croatia) Goran Reljić
- (Croatia) Mirko Filipović
- (United States) Danny Sabatello
- (United States) Jarred Brooks
- (United States) Bob Sapp
- (United States) Muhammed Lawal
- (Japan) Tenshin Nasukawa
- (Japan) Kyoji Horiguchi
- (Japan) Kai Asakura
- (Japan) Mikuru Asakura
- (Japan) Shintaro Ishiwatari
- (Japan) Naoki Inoue
- (Japan) Hiromasa Ougikubo
- (Japan) Takafumi Otsuka
- (Japan) Ulka Sasaki
- (Japan) Shoji
- (United States) Justin Scoggins
- (United States) Ben Nguyen
- (Brazil) Diego Brandao
- (Brazil) Gabi Garcia
- (Suriname) Jairzinho Rozenstruik
- (United States) Daron Cruickshank
- (Japan) Ren Hiramoto
- (Iran) Amir Aliakbari
- (Russia) Fedor Emelianenko
- (Russia) Vadim Nemkov
- (Czech Republic) Jiří Procházka
- (Japan) Tatsuya Kawajiri
- (Japan) Satoru Kitaoka
- (Japan) Takasuke Kume
- (United States) Daron Cruickshank
- (Japan) Takanori Gomi
- (Japan) Gota Yamashita
- (Japan) K-Taro Nakamura
- (United States) C.B. Dollaway
- (Japan) Sudario Tsuyoshi
- (Japan) Chihiro Suzuki (fighter)
- (Brazil) Roberto de Souza
- (Japan) Kyoma Akimoto
- (Japan) Kyohei Hagiwara

== Affiliated organizations ==
Rizin FF is affiliated with the following organizations:

- (United States) Bellator MMA
- (United States) Invicta FC
- (United States) Bare Knuckle Fighting Championship
- (Russia) Fight Nights Global
- (Brazil) Jungle Fight
- (Japan) Deep
- (Japan) Shooto
- (Japan) VTJ
- (Thailand) Full Metal Dojo
- (Japan) K-1
- (Japan) Shoot boxing
- (South Korea) Road FC
- (Poland) KSW
- Lithuania Bushido Federation
- (Czech Republic) Gladiator Championship Fighting
- (Russia) Russian MMA Union

== See also ==
- List of current mixed martial arts champions
