= 2026 in Rizin Fighting Federation =

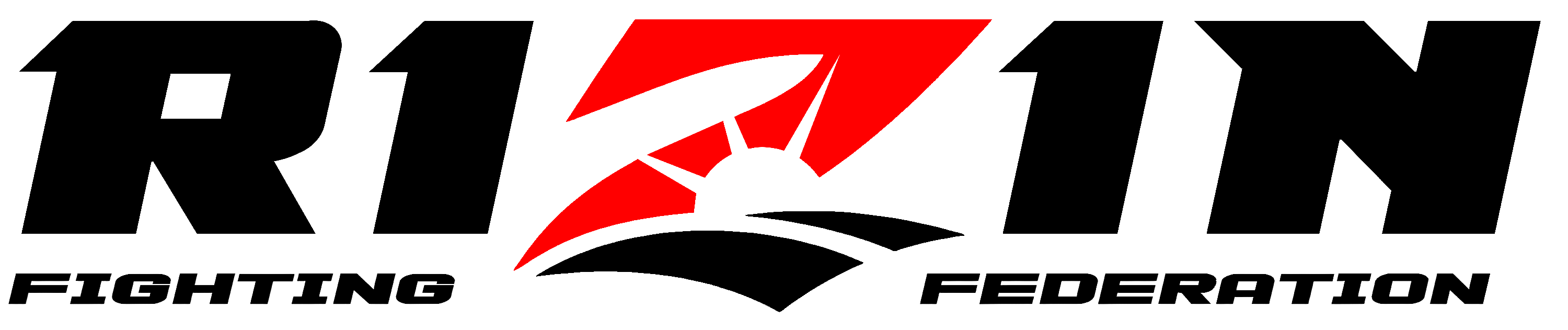

Information
- First date: March 7, 2026

Events

Fights

Chronology
2025 in Rizin Fighting Federation	2026 in Rizin Fighting Federation

The year 2026 will be the 12th year in the history of the Rizin Fighting Federation, a mixed martial arts promotion based in Japan.

== List of events ==
#	Event	Date	Venue	Location	Atten.
1	Rizin 52	Mar 7, 2026	Ariake Arena	Tokyo, Japan	13,307
2	Rizin Landmark 13	Apr 12, 2026	Marine Messe Fukuoka	Fukuoka, Japan	14,817
3	Rizin 53	May 10, 2026	Glion Arena Kobe	Kobe, Japan	10,396
4	Rizin Landmark 14	Jun 6, 2026	Xebio Arena Sendai	Sendai, Japan	4,564
5	Rizin Landmark 15	Jul 18, 2026	Hiroshima Prefectural Sports Center	Hiroshima, Japan	9,928
6	Rizin 54	Aug 11, 2026	Toyota Arena Tokyo	Tokyo, Japan	10,079
7	Super Rizin 5	Sep 10, 2026	Kyocera Dome Osaka	Osaka, Japan	48,968
8	Rizin Landmark 16	Oct 3, 2026	Happiness Arena	Nagasaki, Japan	
9	Rizin 55	Nov 8, 2026	LaLa Arena Tokyo-Bay	Funabashi, Japan	
10	Super Rizin 6	Dec 31, 2026	Vantelin Dome Nagoya	Nagoya, Japan	

== Rizin Japan Heavyweight Grand Prix ==
=== Background ===
On April 23, 2026, it was announced that the "RIZIN JAPAN GP Heavyweight Tournament" will take place in 2026, which semifinals matches was held at Rizin 54 in August, and the two winners will advance to the final match scheduled in November event. The tournament taking part as participants: Mikio Ueda, Tsuyoshi Sudario, King Edokpolo, and Ryo Sakai. The winner of the tournament should face Alexander Soldatkin on New Year's Eve event and compete for inaugural heavyweight title.

=== Tournament bracket ===
Semifinal
(Japan) Tsuyoshi Sudario	TKO
(Japan) Ryo Sakai	1
(Japan) Mikio Ueda	2
(Japan) King Edokpolo	KO

Final
(Japan) Tsuyoshi Sudario
(Japan) King Edokpolo

== Rizin 52 ==
Rizin 52
- Promotion: Rizin Fighting Federation
- Date: March 7, 2026
- Venue: Ariake Arena
- City: Tokyo, Japan

Rizin 52 was a mixed martial arts event that was held by Rizin Fighting Federation on March 7, 2026, at the Ariake Arena in Tokyo, Japan.

=== Background ===
A featherweight bout between Kyoma Akimoto and former Bellator Bantamweight World Champion Patchy Mix headlined this event.

=== Results ===
Main card (Rizin.tv)
Weight class				Method	Round	Time	Notes
Featherweight	Kyoma Akimoto	def.	Patchy Mix	TKO (punches and soccer kicks)	2	0:37
Lightweight	Luiz Gustavo	def.	Taisei Sakuraba	KO (punch)	2	2:32
Featherweight	Ryo Takagi	def.	Shuya Kimura	TKO (doctor stoppage)	1	5:00
Featherweight	Koji Takeda	def.	Viktor Kolesnik	Decision (unanimous) (29–28, 29–28, 29–28)	3	5:00
Intermission (Rizin.tv)
Women's Super Atomweight	Saori Oshima	def.	Kate Oyama	Decision (unanimous) (29–28, 29–28, 29–28)	3	5:00
Catchweight (130 lb)	Yuki Ito	def.	Carlos Mota	KO (head kick and punches)	1	2:27
Bantamweight	Jinnosuke Kashimura	def.	Hideo Tokoro	Technical Submission (anaconda choke)	1	1:06
Lightweight	Kim Kyung-pyo	def.	Yusuke Yachi	TKO (doctor stoppage)	2	4:25
Bantamweight	Shoko Sato	def.	John Sweeney	Submission (triangle choke)	1	4:49
Flyweight	Tony Laramie	def.	Takaki Soya	TKO (punches)	3	2:00
Opening Ceremony (YouTube)
Flyweight	Lee Jung-hyun	def.	Jo Arai	TKO (knees and punches)	3	3:44
Women's Super Atomweight	Noeru Narita	def.	Lee Bo-mi	Submission (guillotine choke)	1	2:08

== Rizin Landmark 13 ==
Rizin Landmark 13 in Fukuoka
- Promotion: Rizin Fighting Federation
- Date: April 12, 2026
- Venue: Marine Messe Fukuoka
- City: Fukuoka, Japan

Rizin Landmark 13 in Fukuoka was a combat sports event that was held by Rizin Fighting Federation on April 12, 2026, at Marine Messe Fukuoka in Fukuoka, Japan.

=== Background ===
The event marked the promotion's fourth visit to Fukuoka and first since Rizin 39 in October 2022.

A Rizin Featherweight Championship bout between current champion Razhabali Shaydullaev and former K-1 Welterweight Champion Yuta Kubo headlined the event. The pairing previously fought at Rizin 49 in December 2024, which Shaydullaev won by second round TKO.

A Rizin Bantamweight Championship bout between current champion Danny Sabatello and Joji Goto co-headlined the event.

=== Results ===
Main card (Rizin.tv)
Weight class				Method	Round	Time	Notes
Featherweight	Razhabali Shaydullaev (c)	def.	Yuta Kubo	TKO (punches)	1	4:13	(Note: For the Rizin Featherweight Championship.)
Bantamweight	Danny Sabatello (c)	def.	Joji Goto	Decision (unanimous) (30–27, 30–26, 30–27)	3	5:00	(Note: For the Rizin Bantamweight Championship.)
Lightweight	Yoshinori Horie	def.	Patricky Pitbull	Decision (split) (29–28, 28–29, 30–27)	3	5:00
Featherweight	Kyohei Hagiwara	vs.	Abijah Kaleo Meheula	No Contest (missed weight)	1	4:49	(Note: Originally ruled a TKO (knees and punches) win for Meheula; overturned by promoter due to him missing weight (148.8 lb).)
Intermission (Rizin.tv)
Bantamweight	Azizbek Temirov	def.	Ryuya Fukuda	KO (punch)	2	1:40
Featherweight (Kickboxing)	Taio Asahisa	def.	Singphayak HamaGym	KO (punch to the body)	1	1:45
Flyweight	Makoto Takahashi	def.	Nkazimulo Zulu	Submission (kimura)	1	2:52
Women's Super Atomweight	Natalia Kuziutina	def.	Ayaka Hamasaki	Submission (armbar)	1	4:54
Featherweight	Kazumasa Majima	def.	James Gallagher	Technical Submission (arm-triangle choke)	3	2:34
Lightweight	Nurkhan Zhumagazy	def.	Tenya Yoshimura	Decision (unanimous) (29–26, 30–25, 29–26)	3	5:00	(Note: Yoshimura missed weight (164.2 lb).)
Flyweight	Kyohei Takagi	def.	Ryosuke Honda	TKO (punches)	1	4:59
Bantamweight	Hyuga Miyagawa	def.	Seiya Inoue	Decision (unanimous) (30–27, 29–28, 29–28)	3	5:00
Rizin MMA Special Rules (5min / 2R)
Flyweight	Shun Okamoto	def.	Taiki Yahiro	Decision (unanimous) (20–18, 20–18, 20–18)	2	5:00
Bantamweight	Tomoaki Arimatsu	def.	Kodai Yamasaki	TKO (punches)	1	4:37
Lightweight	Ryota Oki	def.	Ginji Arai	Decision (unanimous) (20–18, 19–19, 20–18)	2	5:00
Kickboxing bout
Flyweight	Ryusei Imamura	def.	Yuki Kurotsuchi	TKO (leg kick)	2	0:55

== Rizin 53 ==
Rizin 53
- Promotion: Rizin Fighting Federation
- Date: May 10, 2026
- Venue: Glion Arena Kobe
- City: Kobe, Japan

Rizin 53 was combat sports event that was held by Rizin Fighting Federation on May 10, 2026, at the Glion Arena Kobe in Kobe, Japan.

=== Background ===
The event marked the promotion's fifth visit to Kobe and first since Rizin Landmark 12 in November 2025.

A Rizin Lightweight Championship bout between current champion Ilkhom Nozimov and Luiz Gustavo headlined the event.

=== Results ===
Main card (Rizin.tv)
Weight class				Method	Round	Time	Notes
Lightweight	Luiz Gustavo	def.	Ilkhom Nozimov (c)	KO (punches)	1	2:08	(Note: For the Rizin Lightweight Championship.)
Openweight	Kōji Tanaka	vs.	Ren Hiramoto	Draw (time limit)	3	3:00	(Note: Rizin Special Standing Rules.)
Featherweight	Ryo Takagi	def.	Li Kaiwen	KO (punches)	1	1:38
Bantamweight	Shinobu Ota	def.	Yuto Hokamura	Submission (arm-triangle choke)	2	4:25
Intermission (Rizin.tv)
Catchweight (112 lb)	Kate Oyama	def.	Katie Perez	Decision (unanimous) (30–27, 30–27, 30–27)	3	5:00
Lightweight	Sho Patrick Usami	def.	Tatsuya Saika	KO (punch and soccer kick)	1	1:38
Featherweight	Ryan Cafaro	def.	Koyomi Matsushima	Submission (inverted guillotine choke)	3	2:23
Bantamweight	Daiki Tsubota	def.	Genji Umeno	Submission (triangle choke)	1	2:37
Catchweight (137 lb)	Ryoma Shishimoto	def.	Kenshin Kodama	Technical Submission (armbar)	1	1:11
Flyweight	Joe Hiramoto	def.	Seiya Ameyama	Submission (rear-naked choke)	2	0:27
Featherweight	Kouki Nakagawa	def.	Jake Wilkins	Decision (unanimous) (29–27, 29–27, 29–27)	3	5:00	(Note: Wilkins was deducted one point in round 3 due to repeated low blows.)
Opening Ceremony: Rizin MMA Special Rules (5min / 2R)
Flyweight	Souru Hamaguchi	def.	Haruto Sunada	KO (punches)	1	2:33
Kickboxing bouts
Catchweight (137 lb)	Yushi	def.	Asataro	Decision (unanimous) (30–25, 30–25, 30–25)	3	5:00
Catchweight (101 lb)	Hinata Kitano	def.	Juna Koda	Decision (unanimous) (30–27, 29–28, 30–27)	3	3:00
Flyweight	Shota	def.	Tomoya Sudo	Decision (unanimous) (28–27, 28–27, 28–27)	3	3:00

== Rizin Landmark 14 ==
Rizin Landmark 14 in Sendai
- Promotion: Rizin Fighting Federation
- Date: June 6, 2026
- Venue: Xebio Arena Sendai
- City: Sendai, Japan

Rizin Landmark 14 in Sendai was a combat sports event that was held by Rizin Fighting Federation on June 6, 2026, at Xebio Arena Sendai in Sendai, Japan.

=== Background ===
The event marked the promotion's debut in Sendai.

A Rizin Flyweight Championship bout between current champion (also 2021 Rizin Bantamweight and 2025 Rizin Flyweight Grand Prix winner) Hiromasa Ougikubo and Makoto Takahashi headlined the event. The pairing previously met at Super Rizin 3 in July 2024, which Ougikubo won by unanimous decision.

=== Results ===
Main card (Rizin.tv)
Weight class				Method	Round	Time	Notes
Flyweight	Makoto Takahashi	def.	Hiromasa Ougikubo (c)	Decision (unanimous) (30–27, 30–27, 29–28)	3	5:00	(Note: For the Rizin Flyweight Championship.)
Catchweight (130 lb)	Tony Laramie	def.	Yuki Motoya	Decision (unanimous) (30–26, 30–26, 30–25)	3	5:00
Heavyweight	Satoshi Kamiyama	def.	Ryo Sakai	KO (punches)	1	1:16	(Note: Kamiyama missed weight (267.2 lb).)
Intermission (Rizin.tv)
Lightweight	BeyNoah	def.	Bilal Kai Haga	KO (head kick)	2	0:10	(Note: Haga missed weight (156.7 lb).)
Lightweight	Yusuke Yachi	def.	Isao Kobayashi	Decision (unanimous) (29–28, 29–28, 29–28)	3	5:00
Flyweight	Daichi Tomizawa	def.	Rui Kato	TKO (knees and elbows)	1	4:37
Featherweight	Naoki Tanaka	def.	Kaisei Kuroi	TKO (knees and punches)	1	3:37
Bantamweight	Seiya Inoue	def.	Koki Akada	KO (punches)	3	0:28
Opening Ceremony: Rizin MMA Special Rules (5min / 2R)
Flyweight	Hayato Kikuchi	def.	Taylan Yuasa	Decision (split) (20–18, 20–18, 19–19)	2	5:00
Kickboxing bouts
Catchweight (149 lb)	Koya Saito	def.	Kazuki Yamagishi	TKO (three knockdowns)	1	1:25
Catchweight (124.5 lb)	Daichi Akahara	def.	Sho Uchida	Decision (unanimous) (30–27, 30–27, 29–28)	3	3:00
Catchweight (137 lb)	Yusuke Iwaki	def.	Sho Nakaizumi	KO (flying knee)	3	0:43

== Rizin Landmark 15 ==
Rizin Landmark 15 in Hiroshima
- Promotion: Rizin Fighting Federation
- Date: July 18, 2026
- Venue: Hiroshima Prefectural Sports Center
- City: Hiroshima, Japan

Rizin Landmark 15 in Hiroshima was a combat sports event produced by Rizin Fighting Federation that took place on July 18, 2026, at the Hiroshima Prefectural Sports Center in Hiroshima, Japan.

=== Background ===
The event marked the promotion's debut in Hiroshima.

A Rizin Bantamweight Championship bout between current champion Danny Sabatello and Jinnosuke Kashimura headlined the event.

=== Results ===
Main card (Rizin.tv)
Weight class				Method	Round	Time	Notes
Bantamweight	Danny Sabatello (c)	def.	Jinnosuke Kashimura	KO (punch)	3	0:40	(Note: For the Rizin Bantamweight Championship.)
Featherweight	Karshyga Dautbek	def.	Kyohei Hagiwara	TKO (punches)	1	4:08
Bantamweight	Yrysbek Tilenov	def.	Shinobu Ota	TKO (knee)	2	3:04
Flyweight	Erson Yamamoto	def.	Hiroya Kondo	Decision (unanimous) (30–27, 29–28, 29–28)	3	5:00
Intermission (Rizin.tv)
Lightweight	Johnny Case	def.	Tenya Yoshimura	TKO (punches)	1	3:14
Women's Super Atomweight	Saori Oshima	def.	Lee Ye-ji	Submission (kneebar)	1	1:40
Women's Super Atomweight	Park Si-woo	def.	Moeri Suda	Decision (unanimous) (29–27, 29–27, 29–26)	3	5:00
Catchweight (141 lb)	Shoji Maruyama	def.	Genji Umeno	Decision (unanimous) (30–27, 30–27, 30–27)	3	5:00
Featherweight	Hiroaki Suzuki	def.	Hyuga Miyagawa	TKO (elbows and knees)	2	3:29
Welterweight	Yota Hayashi	def.	Shinji Sasaki	KO (knees)	3	2:17
Flyweight	Kyohei Takagi	def.	Lee Jae-hun	TKO (punches)	3	4:25
Kickboxing bout
Catchweight (120 lb)	Kojiro Shiba	def.	Haruto	Decision (unanimous) (29–26, 29–26, 30–25)	3	3:00	(Note: Haruto missed weight (123.6 lb).)
Opening Ceremony: Rizin MMA Special Rules (5min / 2R)
Women's Super Atomweight	Namiko Kawabata	def.	Ayane Hirata	Decision (unanimous) (20–17, 20–17, 20–17)	2	5:00
Bantamweight	Shota Nagano	def.	Shuichi Kanda	Decision (unanimous) (20–18, 19–19, 20–18)	2	5:00
Lightweight	Takuya Shibamura	def.	Taisei Mizusugi	Decision (split) (20–18, 19–19, 20–18)	2	5:00
Amateur bout
Flyweight	Jin Tanaka	def.	Kentaro Tomita	Decision (unanimous) (20–18, 20–28, 20–18)	2	3:00

== Rizin 54 ==
Rizin 54
- Promotion: Rizin Fighting Federation
- Date: August 11, 2026
- Venue: Toyota Arena Tokyo
- City: Tokyo, Japan

Rizin 54 was a combat sports event that held by Rizin Fighting Federation on August 11, 2026, at Toyota Arena Tokyo in Tokyo, Japan.

=== Background ===
A featherweight bout between former two-time Rizin Featherweight Champion Kleber Koike Erbst and Kyoma Akimoto headlined this event.

The semifinals of Rizin Japan Heavyweight Grand Prix took place at this event.

=== Results ===
Main card (Rizin.tv)
Weight class				Method	Round	Time	Notes
Featherweight	Kyoma Akimoto	def.	Kleber Koike Erbst	Decision (unanimous) (30–27, 29–27, 30–26)	3	5:00
Bantamweight	Shoko Sato	def.	Patchy Mix	Decision (unanimous) (28–27, 28–27, 28–27)	3	5:00	(Note: Mix missed weight (140.7 lb).)
Heavyweight	King Edokpolo	def.	Mikio Ueda	KO (knee)	2	0:47	(Note: Rizin Japan Heavyweight Grand Prix Semifinal.)
Heavyweight	Tsuyoshi Sudario	def.	Ryo Sakai	TKO (soccer kick and punches)	1	4:26	(Note: Rizin Japan Heavyweight Grand Prix Semifinal.)
Intermission (Rizin.tv)
Flyweight	Yuki Ito	def.	Alibek Gadzhammatov	TKO (knees to the body and punches)	2	3:51	(Note: Gadzhammatov missed weight (129.6 lb).)
Featherweight	Koji Takeda	def.	Kazumasa Majima	Submission (triangle armbar)	1	4:58
Bantamweight	Joji Goto	def.	Azizbek Temirov	Submission (rear-naked choke)	1	3:41
Flyweight	Joe Hiramoto	def.	Ryoma Shishimoto	KO (punch)	1	1:36
Catchweight (152 lb)	Naoki Tanaka	def.	Issa Hosokawa	TKO (doctor stoppage)	2	3:09
Featherweight	Li Kaiwen	def.	Arata Mizuno	KO (punches)	1	4:27

== Super Rizin 5 ==
Super Rizin 5: Naniwa No Chou Fukkatsu Matsuri
- Promotion: Rizin Fighting Federation
- Date: September 10, 2026
- Venue: Kyocera Dome Osaka
- City: Osaka, Japan
- Attendance: 49,000

Super Rizin 5: Naniwa No Chou Fukkatsu Matsuri was a combat sports event that held by Rizin Fighting Federation on September 10, 2026, at the Kyocera Dome Osaka in Osaka, Japan.

=== Background ===
The event marked the promotion's sixth visit to Osaka and first since Rizin 41 in April 2023.

A Rizin Featherweight Championship bout between undefeated champion Razhabali Shaydullaev and former Bellator Featherweight World Champion A. J. McKee headlined the event, with the inaugural PFL Featherweight Championship also on the line.

=== Results ===
Main card (Rizin.tv)
Weight class				Method	Round	Time	Notes
Featherweight	Razhabali Shaydullaev (c)	def.	A. J. McKee	Decision (unanimous) (30–27, 30–27, 30–27)	3	5:00	(Note: For the Rizin Featherweight Championship and the inaugural PFL Featherweight Championship.)
Lightweight	Mikuru Asakura	def.	Shinya Aoki	KO (punches)	1	2:39
Featherweight	Ren Hiramoto	def.	Karshyga Dautbek	Decision (split) (29–28, 27–29, 29–28)	3	5:00
Intermission (Rizin.tv)
Lightweight	Roberto de Souza	def.	Shunta Nomura	Decision (unanimous) (29–28, 29–28, 29–28)	3	5:00
Featherweight	Yutaka Saito	def.	Ren Sugiyama	Decision (unanimous) (30–27, 30–27, 30–27)	3	5:00
Featherweight	Vugar Karamov	def.	Ryo Takagi	Decision (unanimous) (30–27, 30–27, 29–28)	3	5:00
Women's Super Atomweight	Natalia Kuziutina	def.	Rena Kubota	Submission (guillotine choke)	2	3:14
Kickboxing Open-Finger Gloves bout
Lightweight	Meison Hide Usami	def.	BeyNoah	Decision (unanimous) (30–25, 30–25, 30–25)	3	3:00

== Rizin Landmark 16 ==
Rizin Landmark 16 in Nagasaki
- Promotion: Rizin Fighting Federation
- Date: October 3, 2026
- Venue: Happiness Arena
- City: Nagasaki, Japan

Rizin Landmark 16 in Nagasaki was a combat sports event that held by Rizin Fighting Federation on October 3, 2026, at the Happiness Arena in Nagasaki, Japan.

=== Background ===
The event marked the promotion's first visit to Nagasaki.

A lightweight bout between Yoshinori Horie and Sho Patrick Usami headlined the event.

=== Results ===
Main card (Rizin.tv)
Weight class				Method	Round	Time	Notes
Catchweight (160 lb)	Yoshinori Horie	def.	Sho Patrick Usami	TKO (elbow and punches)	2	3:37
Featherweight	Viktor Kolesnik	def.	Koyomi Matsushima	TKO (elbows and soccer kick)	2	0:20
Featherweight	Hyuma Yasui	def.	Ryan Cafaro	Decision (unanimous) (30–27, 30–27, 30–27)	3	5:00
Women's Super Atomweight	Kate Oyama	def.	Noeru Narita	Decision (split) (30–27, 28–29, 29–28)	3	5:00
Intermission (Rizin.tv)
Flyweight	Kyohei Takagi	def.	Masatoshi Ueda	TKO (knees and punches)	1	3:26
Bantamweight	Seiya Inoue	def.	Ryusei Ashizawa	TKO (punches)	1	4:56
Heavyweight	Hidetaka Arato	def.	Ken Hasegawa	Decision (unanimous) (30–25, 30–25, 30–25)	3	5:00
Bantamweight	Alan Yamaniha	def.	Seigo Yamamoto	Submission (kneebar)	1	3:00	(Note: Yamamoto missed weight (134.7 lb).)
Flyweight	Kohei Sugiyama	def.	Kaito Oda	Decision (split) (29–28, 29–28, 28–28)	3	5:00
Opening Ceremony: Rizin MMA Special Rules (5min / 2R)
Lightweight	Ryota Oki	def.	Daisuke Okumiya	TKO (punches and soccer kicks)	1	4:47
Kickboxing bouts
Catchweight (220 lb)	Kotaro Mori	def.	Yuki	KO (punch)	1	1:42
Flyweight	Ryusei Imamura	def.	Reon Uemura	TKO (punches)	1	1:39
Catchweight (143 lb)	Ayuto	def.	Kakeru Tsuda	Decision (unanimous) (28–27, 28–27, 29–26)	3	3:00	(Note: Kakeru missed weight (145.4 lb).)

== Rizin 55 ==
Rizin 55
- Promotion: Rizin Fighting Federation
- Date: November 8, 2026
- Venue: LaLa Arena Tokyo-Bay
- City: Funabashi, Japan

Rizin 55 was a combat sports event that held by Rizin Fighting Federation on November 8, 2026, at the LaLa Arena Tokyo-Bay in Funabashi, Japan.

=== Background ===
A Rizin Flyweight Championship bout between current champion Makoto Takahashi and Tony Laramie headlined the event.

=== Results ===
Main card (Rizin.tv)
Weight class				Method	Round	Time	Notes
Flyweight	Tony Laramie	def.	Makoto Takahashi (c)	Decision (split) (29–28, 28–29, 29–28)	3	5:00	(Note: For the Rizin Flyweight Championship.)
Bantamweight	Yrysbek Tilenov	def.	Naoki Inoue	Decision (unanimous) (30–27, 30–27, 29–28)	3	5:00
Bantamweight	Ryuya Fukuda	def.	Kim Soo-chul	Decision (unanimous) (30–27, 30–27, 29–28)	3	5:00
Bantamweight	Jinnosuke Kashimura	def.	Shinobu Ota	Submission (Ezekiel choke)	3	1:51
Featherweight	Abijah Kaleo Meheula	vs.	Kazuki Aimoto	No Contest (missed weight)	2	4:58	(Note: Meheula missed weight (146.5 lb). Originally ruled a TKO (punches) win for Meheula; overturned by the promoter due to him missing weight.)
Intermission (Rizin.tv)
Featherweight	Juntaro Ushiku	def.	Li Kaiwen	Decision (unanimous) (29–27, 29–27, 30–26)	3	5:00
Lightweight	Nurkhan Zhumagazy	def.	Kim Kyung-pyo	TKO (punches)	1	3:34
Heavyweight	Mac Papalii	def.	Yukinori Akazawa	KO (punches)	2	2:15
Featherweight	Kim Sei-min	def.	Hiroaki Suzuki	TKO (punches and elbows)	2	4:41
Bantamweight	Tsukasa Mizoguchi	def.	Taichi Nakajima	Technical Submission (rear-naked choke)	1	0:22
Lightweight	Tatsuya Saika	def.	Daigo Kuramoto	KO (knee and punches)	1	1:38
Flyweight	Takumi Hamada	def.	Sho Sekihara	KO (slam and punches)	3	4:56
Flyweight	Rikiya Matsuzawa	def.	Rio Kimura	Decision (unanimous) (30–27, 30–27, 30–27)	3	5:00
Opening Ceremony: Rizin MMA Special Rules (5min / 2R)
Lightweight	Yajuro Yamasaki	def.	Jake Wilkins	TKO (knees and punches)	1	4:58
Featherweight	Saw Thwee Waw Thaunt	def.	Shunya Inoue	Decision (unanimous) (20–18, 20–18, 18–18)	2	5:00
Featherweight	Masachika Takahashi	def.	Naohiro Matsumoto	KO (knees and punches)	1	0:25

== Super Rizin 6 ==
Super Rizin 6: Shiwasu No Owari Nagoya Gekokujo Matsuri
- Promotion: Rizin Fighting Federation
- Date: December 31, 2026
- Venue: Vantelin Dome Nagoya
- City: Nagoya, Japan

Super Rizin 6: Shiwasu No Owari Nagoya Gekokujo Matsuri is an upcoming combat sports event that will be held by Rizin Fighting Federation on December 31, 2026, at the Vantelin Dome Nagoya in Nagoya, Japan.

=== Background ===
A Rizin Featherweight Championship bout between current champion Razhabali Shaydullaev and Kyoma Akimoto is expected to headline the event with a lightweight bout between current lightweight champion Luis Gustavo and Mikuru Asakura serving as the co-main event.

In addition, a Rizin Super Atomweight Championship bout for the vacant title between Saori Oshima and Natalia Kuziutina and the final bout of the Rizin Japan Heavyweight Grand Prix are also expected to take place at this event.

== See also ==
- List of current Rizin FF fighters
- 2026 in UFC
- 2026 in ONE Championship
- 2026 in Professional Fighters League
- 2026 in Cage Warriors
- 2026 in Absolute Championship Akhmat
- 2026 in Konfrontacja Sztuk Walki
- 2026 in Legacy Fighting Alliance
- 2026 in LUX Fight League
- 2026 in Oktagon MMA
- 2026 in Brave Combat Federation
- 2026 in UAE Warriors
