= Ilkhom Nozimov =

Uzbek-Russian mixed martial artist (born 1995)

- Born: 27 March 1995 (age 31); Magnitogorsk, Russia
- Height: 5 ft 11 in (1.80 m)
- Weight: 156.4 lb (71 kg; 11 st 2 lb)
- Division: Bantamweight; Featherweight; Lightweight
- Fighting out of: Magnitogorsk, Russia
- Team: Tiger Muay Thai
- Years active: 2015–present

Mixed martial arts record
- Total: 17
- Wins: 13
- By knockout: 7
- By submission: 3
- By decision: 3
- Losses: 4
- By knockout: 2
- By submission: 2

Other information
- Mixed martial arts record from Sherdog

Ilkhom Nozimov (born 27 March 1995) is an Uzbekistani and Russian mixed martial artist who competes in the Rizin Fighting Federation, where he is a former Rizin Lightweight Champion.

== Background ==
Born in Magnitogorsk, Nozimov became fascinated with mixed martial arts by watching Mirko Cro Cop's Pride matches with his brother and began taking up combat sports at the age of six. He then gained experience in various martial arts, including boxing, wrestling, judo, karate, taekwondo, combat sambo, and street fighting, before becoming a mixed martial artist. He made his professional mixed martial arts debut in 2015.

== Mixed martial arts career ==
=== Early career ===
In his early bouts, Nozimov primarily fought in Russia and later UAE Warriors of the United Arab Emirates. He amassed a record of 9–3 prior to being signed by Rizin.

=== Rizin ===
Nozimov made his Rizin debut at Rizin Landmark 7 on 4 November 2023, where he faced Jaures Dea. He won the bout by unanimous decision.

Nozimov faced Sora Yamamoto at Rizin 46 on 29 April 2024. He won the bout by TKO in the second round. During the fight against Yamamoto, Nozimov tore a knee ligament and underwent surgery, resulting in a long absence of about one year and two months.

Nozimov faced Suguru Nii at Rizin Landmark 11 on 14 June 2025. He won the bout by knockout in the first round with a kick to the jaw.

==== Rizin Lightweight Champion ====
Nozimov faced Roberto de Souza for the Rizin lightweight title at Rizin: Shiwasu no Cho Tsuwamono Matsuri on 31 December 2025, replacing Shunta Nomura. He won the bout by KO in the first round to win the title.

Nozimov faced Luiz Gustavo on 10 May 2026, at Rizin 53. He lost the title by knockout in the first round.

== Personal life ==
During the pre-fight press conference for Rizin: The December Super Strongman Festival, held in December 2025, Nozimov revealed that his absolute favorite food is tuna-mayonnaise onigiri, stating that he has eaten 20 to 30 of them a day. He continued to eat tuna-mayonnaise onigiri even while sightseeing in Tokyo after the match.

== Championships and accomplishments ==
- Rizin Fighting Federation
  - Rizin Lightweight Championship (One time)

== Mixed martial arts record ==
Professional record breakdown
17 matches	13 wins	4 losses
By knockout	7	2
By submission	3	2
By decision	3	0

Res.	Record	Opponent	Method	Event	Date	Round	Time	Location	Notes
Loss	13–4	Luiz Gustavo	KO (punches)	Rizin 53	10 May 2026	1	2:08	Kobe, Japan	Lost the Rizin Lightweight Championship.
Win	13–3	Roberto de Souza	KO (knee)	Rizin: Shiwasu no Cho Tsuwamono Matsuri	31 December 2025	1	0:13	Saitama, Japan	Return to Lightweight. Won the Rizin Lightweight Championship.
Win	12–3	Suguru Nii	KO (front kick)	Rizin Landmark 11	14 June 2025	1	2:09	Sapporo, Japan	
Win	11–3	Sora Yamamoto	TKO (elbows and punches)	Rizin 46	29 April 2024	2	3:39	Tokyo, Japan	
Win	10–3	Jaures Dea	Decision (unanimous)	Rizin Landmark 7	4 November 2023	3	5:00	Baku, Azerbaijan	
Loss	9–3	Rustem Kudaibergenov	KO (punch)	UAE Warriors 39	18 March 2023	1	0:08	Abu Dhabi, United Arab Emirates	Catchweight (150 lb) bout.
Win	9–2	Khazar Rustamov	Submission (guillotine choke)	UAE Warriors 34	20 October 2022	1	4:30	Abu Dhabi, United Arab Emirates	
Win	8–2	Sergey Klyuev	TKO (retirement)	Eagle FC 34	19 March 2021	2	5:00	Krasnodar, Russia	
Win	7–2	Viktor Mitkov	Decision (unanimous)	Tyumen Extreme Sports Expo 2019	27 July 2019	3	5:00	Tyumen, Russia	
Win	6–2	Sevak Arekalyan	Decision (unanimous)	WCSA Combat Ring 29	26 April 2019	3	5:00	Magnitogorsk, Russia	
Win	5–2	Vadim Savin	TKO (punches)	I.M. Poddubnogo Sports Club: Confrontation 3	23 November 2018	1	4:06	Krasnoyarsk, Russia	Return to Featherweight.
Win	4–2	Dmitry Shulgin	Submission (choke)	WCSA Combat Ring 25	17 May 2018	1	2:07	Ufa, Russia	
Win	3–2	Kayratbek Imarov	Submission (guillotine choke)	N1 Championship of Contact Unions 2	31 March 2018	1	3:46	Shadrinsk, Russia	Bantamweight debut.
Loss	2–2	Yuriy Virchakov	Submission (rear-naked choke)	Modern Fighting Pankration 215	8 December 2017	1	3:47	Ufa, Russia	
Win	2–1	Ali Rayimzhonov	TKO (punches)	WCSA Combat Ring 23	17 November 2017	1	N/A	Ufa, Russia	Return to Lightweight.
Win	1–1	Vyacheslav Dimov	TKO (punches)	U-Fight: Mixshow Dynamite	4 July 2016	1	1:37	Magnitogorsk, Russia	Featherweight debut.
Loss	0–1	Ruslan Khisamutdinov	Submission (rear-naked choke)	WCSA Combat Ring 13	10 April 2015	1	2:30	Magnitogorsk, Russia	Lightweight debut.

== See also ==
- List of current Rizin Fighting Federation fighters
- List of male mixed martial artists
