= Marek Samociuk =

Polish mixed martial artist from Warsaw

- Born: July 15, 1996 (age 30); Warsaw, Poland
- Nationality: Polish
- Height: 6 ft 0 in (1.83 m)
- Weight: 255 lb (116 kg; 18 st 3 lb)
- Division: Heavyweight; Light Heavyweight; Middleweight
- Style: MMA, Hybrid martial arts
- Stance: Orthodox
- Fighting out of: Warsaw, Poland
- Team: Uniq Fight Club
- Years active: 2019–present

Mixed martial arts record
- Total: 15
- Wins: 9
- By knockout: 4
- By decision: 5
- Losses: 6
- By knockout: 3
- By submission: 1
- By decision: 2

Other information
- Mixed martial arts record from Sherdog

Marek Samociuk (born July 15, 1996) is a Polish mixed martial artist from Warsaw. he has competed for Konfrontacja Sztuk Walki, and Rizin Fighting Federation.

== Mixed martial arts record ==
Professional record breakdown
15 matches	9 wins	6 losses
By knockout	4	3
By submission	0	1
By decision	5	2

Res.	Record	Opponent	Method	Event	Date	Round	Time	Location	Notes
Loss	9–6	Michal Martínek	Decision (unanimous)	KSW 119	June 20, 2026	3	5:00	Radom, Poland	
Loss	9–5	Alexander Soldatkin	Decision (unanimous)	Rizin 51	September 28, 2025	3	5:00	Nagoya, Japan	2025 Rizin Heavyweight Grand Prix Final.
Win	9–4	José Augusto	Decision (unanimous)	Super Rizin 4	July 27, 2025	3	5:00	Saitama, Japan	2025 Rizin Heavyweight Grand Prix Semifinal.
Win	8–4	Daniel James	Decision (unanimous)	Rizin: Otoko Matsuri	May 4, 2025	3	5:00	Tokyo, Japan	2025 Rizin Heavyweight Grand Prix Quarterfinal; James missed weight (120.8 kg).
Win	7–4	Filip Stawowy	Decision (unanimous)	KSW 104	March 8, 2025	3	5:00	Gorzów Wielkopolski, Poland	
Win	6–4	Denis Górniak	KO (leg kicks and punches)	KSW 96	July 20, 2024	1	2:09	Łódź, Poland	Knockout of the Night.
Win	5–4	Oļegs Jemeļjanovs	TKO (punches)	KSW 90	January 20, 2024	2	3:14	Warsaw, Poland	
Loss	4–4	Filip Stawowy	Submission (rear-naked choke)	KSW 81	April 22, 2023	2	4:39	Tomaszów Mazowiecki, Poland	
Loss	4–3	Kamil Gawryjołek	TKO (punches)	KSW 76	November 12, 2022	1	4:37	Grodzisk Mazowiecki, Poland	
Win	4–2	Izu Ugonoh	TKO (punches)	KSW 70	May 28, 2022	1	3:38	Łódź, Poland	
Loss	3–2	Michał Kita	TKO (punches)	KSW 65	December 18, 2021	1	3:21	Gliwice, Poland	
Win	3–1	Izu Ugonoh	TKO (punches)	KSW 60	April 24, 2021	2	0:27	Łódź, Poland	
Win	2–1	Tomasz Janiszewski	Decision (unanimous)	EFM Show 1	April 9, 2021	3	5:00	Łódź, Poland	Heavyweight debut.
Loss	1–1	Paweł Białas	TKO (punches)	Thunderstrike Fight League 19	December 21, 2019	1	1:46	Lublin, Poland	
Win	1–0	Piotr Mochocki	Decision (split)	Thunderstrike Fight League 17	May 25, 2019	3	5:00	Pionki, Poland	Middleweight debut.
