= 2025 in Rizin Fighting Federation =

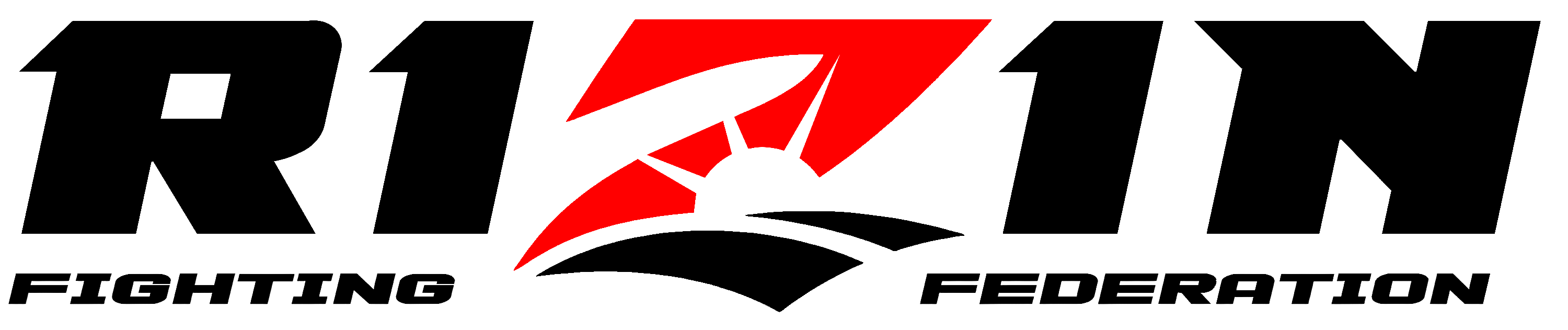

Information
- First date: March 30, 2025
- Last date: December 31, 2025

Events
- Total events: 8

Fights
- Total fights: 135
- Title fights: 11

Chronology
2024 in Rizin Fighting Federation	2025 in Rizin Fighting Federation	2026 in Rizin Fighting Federation

The year 2025 was the 11th year in the history of the Rizin Fighting Federation, a mixed martial arts promotion based in Japan.

== List of events ==
#	Event	Date	Venue	Location
1	Rizin 50	March 30, 2025	Anabuki Arena Kagawa	Takamatsu, Japan
2	Rizin: Otoko Matsuri	May 4, 2025	Tokyo Dome	Tokyo, Japan
3	Rizin World Series in Korea	May 31, 2025	Paradise City	Incheon, South Korea
4	Rizin Landmark 11	June 14, 2025	Makomanai Ice Arena	Sapporo, Japan
5	Super Rizin 4	July 27, 2025	Saitama Super Arena	Saitama, Japan
6	Rizin 51	September 28, 2025	Aichi International Arena	Nagoya, Japan
7	Rizin Landmark 12	November 3, 2025	Glion Arena Kobe	Kobe, Japan
8	Rizin: Shiwasu no Cho Tsuwamono Matsuri	December 31, 2025	Saitama Super Arena	Saitama, Japan

== 2025 Rizin Heavyweight Grand Prix ==
=== Background ===
On March 26, 2025, during a Rizin: Otoko Matsuri Press Conference, Rizin CEO Nobuyuki Sakakibara revealed six fighters completed at 2025 Rizin World Grand Prix, for the heavyweight divisions, includes Alexander Soldatkin, José Augusto Azevedo, Marek Samociuk, Mikio Ueda, Shoma Shibisai and Tsuyoshi Sudario. The quarterfinal took place at Rizin: Otoko Matsuri on May 4. The semifinal took place at Super Rizin 4 on July 27. The final took place at Rizin 51 on September 28. The winner of the tournament will fight against Ryan Bader for the inaugural heavyweight title.

=== Tournament bracket ===
Quarter-finals
(Japan) Mikio Ueda	TKO
(Japan) Shoma Shibisai	1
(France) Prince Aounallah (Note: Islambek Baktybek Uulu withdrew from the tournament due to suffered a meniscus injury and was replaced by Price Aounallah.)	3
(Russia) Alexander Soldatkin	UD
(Poland) Marek Samociuk	UD
(United States) Daniel James	3
(Japan) Tsuyoshi Sudario	3
(Brazil) José Augusto Azevedo	UD

Semi-finals
(Japan) Mikio Ueda	2
(Russia) Alexander Soldatkin	TKO
(Poland) Marek Samociuk	UD
(Brazil) José Augusto Azevedo	3

Final
(Russia) Alexander Soldatkin	UD
(Poland) Marek Samociuk	3

== 2025 Rizin Flyweight Grand Prix ==
=== Background ===
On March 30, 2025, during Rizin 50, Kyoji Horiguchi announced that he had vacated the flyweight title and returned to UFC. Subsequently, the promotion announced it will hold a flyweight grand prix to determine the new 125-pound champion.

On June 14, 2025, during Rizin Landmark 11 in Sapporo intermission, Rizin CEO Nobuyuki Sakakibara revealed that the eight fighters who will compete at the 2025 Rizin World Grand Prix, for the flyweight divisions, are Hiromasa Ougikubo, Yuki Ito, Nkazimulo Zulu, Hiroya Kondo, Alibek Gadzhammatov, Yuki Motoya, Erson Yamamoto and Makoto Takahashi. The quarterfinal will take place at Super Rizin 4 on July 27. The official matchup drawing will take place July 1, 2025. On June 27, 2025, it was reported that two more fighters will compete at the Grand Prix tournament, are Jose Torres and Takaki Soya.

=== Tournament bracket ===
Quarter-finals
(Japan) Yuki Motoya	UD
(Japan) Hiroya Kondo	3
(United States) Jose Torres	3
(Japan) Hiromasa Ougikubo	UD
(Japan) Yuki Ito	UD
(South Africa) Nkazimulo Zulu	3
(Russia) Alibek Gadzhammatov	TKO
(Japan) Takaki Soya	3

Semi-finals

Final

Quarter-final
(Japan) Erson Yamamoto	1
(Japan) Makoto Takahashi	Sub

== Rizin 50 ==
Rizin 50
- Promotion: Rizin Fighting Federation
- Date: March 30, 2025
- Venue: Anabuki Arena Kagawa
- City: Takamatsu, Japan
- Attendance: 9,020

Rizin 50 was a combat sports event held by Rizin Fighting Federation on March 30, 2025, at the Anabuki Arena Kagawa in Takamatsu, Japan.

=== Background ===
A Rizin Bantamweight Championship bout between current champion Naoki Inoue and Yuki Motoya headlined the event. The pairing previously met at Rizin 26 in December 2020, which Inoue won by first round submission.

At the weigh-ins, Spike Carlyle weighed in at 160.9 pounds, 4.4 pounds over the lightweight limit and he was fined 50% of his purse, which went to Takeshi Izumi. As a results, if Carlyle wins or the bout ends in a draw, the official result was record as a no contest.

=== Results ===
Main card (Rizin.tv)
Weight Class				Method	Round	T.Time	Notes
Bantamweight 61 kg	(Japan) Naoki Inoue (c)	def.	(Japan) Yuki Motoya	Decision (split)	3	5:00	For the Rizin Bantamweight Championship.
Featherweight 66 kg	(Kazakhstan) Karshyga Dautbek	def.	(Japan) Chihiro Suzuki	Decision (split)	3	5:00	
Lightweight 71 kg	(Japan) Shunta Nomura	def.	(Brazil) Luiz Gustavo	Technical Decision (unanimous)	3	2:29	Accidental clash of heads rendered Gustavo unable to continue.
Heavyweight 120 kg	(Japan) King Edokpolo	def.	(Japan) Ryo Sakai	TKO (punches)	2	2:32	
Intermission (Rizin.tv)
Featherweight 66 kg	(Japan) Kyohei Hagiwara	def.	(United States) Toby Misech	TKO (punches)	1	0:26	
Featherweight 66 kg	(Japan) Shuya Kimura	def.	(Japan) Takeji Yokoyama	KO (punches)	1	0:54	
Catchweight 59 kg	(Japan) Yuki Ito	def.	(Canada) Tony Laramie	Decision (unanimous)	3	5:00	
Catchweight 59 kg	(Japan) Yoshiro Maeda	def.	(Japan) Sanou Yokouchi	Submission (rear-naked choke)	3	2:55	
Lightweight 71 kg	(Japan) Takeshi Izumi	def.	(United States) Spike Carlyle	Decision (unanimous)	3	5:00	Carlyle missed weight (73 kg).
Women's Strawweight 52 kg	(Japan) Machi Fukuda	def.	(South Korea) Park Seo-young	TKO (punches)	2	4:04	
Strawweight 53 kg	(Japan) Haruo Ochi	def.	(Japan) Nobuyoshi Nakatsukasa	Submission (guillotine choke)	3	1:22	
Bantamweight 61 kg	(Japan) Mamoru Uoi	def.	(Japan) Koki Akada	Decision (split)	3	5:00	
Opening Ceremony: Kickboxing bouts (YouTube)
Catchweight 67.5 kg	(Japan) Ryoya Inai	def.	(Japan) Rinto Kako	TKO (punches)	1	2:57	
Catchweight 63.5 kg	(Japan) Ryuki Yoshioka	def.	(Japan) Daiki Kirizume	Decision (split)	3	3:00	
Catchweight 63 kg	(Japan) Shoji Otani	def.	(Japan) Yamato Ashikaga	KO (punch)	1	3:00	
Flyweight 57 kg	(Japan) Hiroki Takaoka	def.	(Japan) Seiya Ameyama	Submission (rear-naked choke)	2	3:04	Rizin MMA Special Rules (5min / 2R).
Catchweight 55 kg	(Japan) Toki Kagawa	def.	(Japan) Ryuki	Decision (unanimous)	3	3:00	

== Rizin: Otoko Matsuri ==
Rizin: Otoko Matsuri
- Promotion: Rizin Fighting Federation
- Date: May 4, 2025
- Venue: Tokyo Dome
- City: Tokyo, Japan

Rizin: Otoko Matsuri (formerly known as Rizin: The Match 2) was a combat sports event held by Rizin Fighting Federation on May 4, 2025, at the Tokyo Dome in Tokyo, Japan.

=== Background ===
A featherweight rematch between Mikuru Asakura and Ren Hiramoto was scheduled to headline the event. The pairing previously met at Super Rizin 3 in July 2024, which Hiramoto won by first-round knockout. However on March 3, the promotion officially announced that Hiramoto withdrew due to a shoulder injury and Asakura expected to still compete on the card. On March 7, the promotion announced that the event is changed to Rizin: Otoko Matsuri.

A Rizin Featherweight Championship bout between current two-time champion Kleber Koike Erbst and Razhabali Shaydullaev headlined the event.

The quarterfinals of 2025 Rizin World Grand Prix heavyweight tournament took place at this event. However, the bout between Islambek Baktybek Uulu and Alexander Soldatkin got rescheduled for June 14 at Rizin Landmark 11 after Baktybek Uulu has suffered a meniscus injury.

=== Results ===
Main card
Weight Class				Method	Round	T.Time	Notes
Featherweight 66 kg	(Kyrgyzstan) Razhabali Shaydullaev	def.	(Brazil) Kleber Koike Erbst (c)	KO (punches)	1	1:02	For the Rizin Featherweight Championship.
Featherweight 66 kg	(Japan) Mikuru Asakura	def.	(Japan) Chihiro Suzuki	TKO (doctor stoppage)	3	1:56	
Featherweight 66 kg	(Japan) Kyoma Akimoto	def.	(Japan) Ryo Takagi	Decision (unanimous)	3	5:00	
Featherweight 66 kg	(Japan) Kyohei Hagiwara	def.	(Japan) Taisei Nishitani	KO (punch)	1	3:36	
Heavyweight 120 kg	(Japan) Mikio Ueda	def.	(Japan) Shoma Shibisai	TKO (leg kicks)	1	1:03	2025 Rizin Heavyweight Grand Prix Quarterfinal.
Heavyweight 120 kg	(Brazil) José Augusto Azevedo	def.	(Japan) Tsuyoshi Sudario	Decision (unanimous)	3	5:00	2025 Rizin Heavyweight Grand Prix Quarterfinal.
Intermission (PPV at Rizin.tv)
Heavyweight 120 kg	(Poland) Marek Samociuk	def.	(United States) Daniel James	Decision (unanimous)	3	5:00	2025 Rizin Heavyweight Grand Prix Quarterfinal; James missed weight (120.8 kg).
Catchweight 98 kg	(Japan) Kouzi	vs.	(Iran) Sina Karimian	Draw (time limit)	3	3:00	Rizin Special Standing bout (Kouzi: 8oz / Karimian: 12oz gloves).
Catchweight 59 kg	(Japan) Makoto Takahashi	def.	(Japan) Yuki Ito	Decision (unanimous)	3	5:00	
Lightweight 71 kg	(Japan) Daisuke Nakamura	def.	(Japan) Taisei Sakuraba	Submission (armbar)	2	2:01	
Bantamweight 61 kg	(United States) Danny Sabatello	def.	(Japan) Shinobu Ota	KO (punches)	3	0:20	
Flyweight 57 kg	(Japan) Hiroya Kondo	def.	(Japan) Tatsuki Shinotsuka	TKO (corner stoppage)	1	2:11	
Flyweight 57 kg	(Japan) Takaki Soya	def.	(United States) John Dodson	Decision (unanimous)	3	5:00	
Catchweight 63 kg	(Japan) Taio Asahisa	def.	(Japan) Yoshiya Uzatsuyo	KO (head kick)	2	1:15	Kickboxing bout.
Flyweight 57 kg	(Japan) Erson Yamamoto	def.	(Japan) Daichi Tomizawa	Submission (face crank)	2	1:24	
Flyweight 57 kg	(Japan) Joe Hiramoto	def.	(Japan) Toki Tamaru	Decision (unanimous)	3	5:00	
Opening Ceremony
Catchweight 75 kg	(Japan) Yuga Nakaya	def.	(Japan) Hiro Sasaki	Decision (unanimous)	2	5:00	Rizin MMA Special Rules (5min / 2R).
Featherweight 66 kg	(Brazil) Vinicius Tsuchihashi Silveira	def.	(Japan) Takao Ueda	Decision (unanimous)	2	5:00	Rizin MMA Special Rules (5min / 2R).
Catchweight 57.5 kg	(Japan) Futa Hashimoto	def.	(Japan) Daichi Akahira	Decision (unanimous)	3	3:00	Kickboxing bout.

== Rizin World Series in Korea ==
Rizin World Series in Korea
- Promotion: Rizin Fighting Federation
- Date: May 31, 2025
- Venue: Paradise City
- City: Incheon, South Korea

Rizin World Series in Korea was a combat sports event held by Rizin Fighting Federation on May 31, 2025, at the Paradise City in Incheon, South Korea.

=== Background ===
This event marked the promotion's debut in South Korea.

A lightweight bout between a current Rizin Lightweight Champion Roberto de Souza and Ki Won-bin headlined the event.

=== Results ===
Main card (Rizin.tv)
Weight Class				Method	Round	T.Time	Notes
Lightweight 71 kg	(Brazil) Roberto de Souza	def.	(South Korea) Ki Won-bin	Technical Submission (rear-naked choke)	1	0:50	
Bantamweight 61 kg	(Japan) Shoko Sato	def.	(South Korea) Kim Soo-chul	Decision (unanimous)	3	5:00	
Lightweight 71 kg	(United States) Johnny Case	vs.	(Japan) Juri Ohara	No Contest (missed weight)	1	2:20	Case missed weight (71.3 kg). Originally ruled a KO (punch) win for Case; overturned by promoter due to him missing weight.
Women's Catchweight 49 kg	(Japan) Kate Oyama	def.	(South Korea) Shim Yu-ri	Decision (unanimous)	3	5:00	
Intermission (Rizin.tv)
Lightweight 71 kg	(Japan) Sho Patrick Usami	def.	(South Korea) Kim Si-won	Decision (unanimous)	3	5:00	
Bantamweight 61 kg	(South Korea) Yang Ji-yong	def.	(Japan) Yuto Hokamura	TKO (punches)	3	0:19	
Featherweight 66 kg	(South Korea) Ji Hyuk-min	def.	(Japan) Koji Takeda	TKO (knees and punches)	2	4:13	
Featherweight 66 kg	(South Korea) Song Young-jae	def.	(Japan) Yoshiki Nakahara	KO (punch)	3	1:28	
Catchweight 63 kg	(South Korea) Kwon Yong-cheol	def.	(Japan) Kota Miura	TKO (elbows and punches)	1	2:46	
Kickboxing bouts
Catchweight 67.5 kg	(South Korea) Jo Sang-hae	vs.	(Japan) Meison Hide Usami	Draw (unanimous)	3	3:00	
Catchweight 62 kg	(Japan) Seiya Inoue	def.	(South Korea) Kang Beom-jun	Decision (unanimous)	3	3:00	

== Rizin Landmark 11 ==
Rizin Landmark 11 in Sapporo
- Promotion: Rizin Fighting Federation
- Date: June 14, 2025
- Venue: Makomanai Ice Arena
- City: Sapporo, Japan

Rizin Landmark 11 in Sapporo was a combat sports event held by Rizin Fighting Federation on June 14, 2025, at Makomanai Ice Arena in Sapporo, Japan.

=== Background ===
A featherweight bout between former Rizin Featherweight Champion Vugar Karamov and undefeated prospect Shuya Kimura headlined the event.

In addition, 2025 Rizin Heavyweight Grand Prix quarterfinal originally scheduled as Islambek Baktybek Uulu vs. Alexander Soldatkin at Rizin: Otoko Matsuri, but Baktybek Uulu withdrew as suffered a meniscus injury. Instead, Soldatkin faced Price Aounallah at this event.

=== Results ===
Main card (Rizin.tv)
Weight Class				Method	Round	T.Time	Notes
Featherweight 66 kg	(Azerbaijan) Vugar Karamov	def.	(Japan) Shuya Kimura	Decision (unanimous)	3	5:00	
Lightweight 71 kg	(Japan) Yoshinori Horie	def.	(Japan) Yamato Nishikawa	TKO (elbows and punches)	1	4:40	
Featherweight 66 kg	(Uzbekistan) Ilkhom Nozimov	def.	(Japan) Suguru Nii	KO (front kick)	1	2:09	
Featherweight 66 kg	(Japan) Hiroaki Suzuki	def.	(Japan) Sora Yamamoto	Decision (unanimous)	3	5:00	
Featherweight 66 kg	(Russia) Viktor Kolesnik	def.	(Japan) Keisuke Sasu	KO (punch to the body)	1	4:43	
Intermission (Rizin.tv)
Heavyweight 120 kg	(Russia) Alexander Soldatkin	def.	(France) Prince Aounallah	Decision (unanimous)	3	5:00	2025 Rizin Heavyweight Grand Prix Quarterfinal.
Bantamweight 61 kg	(Japan) Joji Goto	def.	(Japan) Jinnosuke Kashimura	Decision (unanimous)	3	5:00	
Heavyweight 120 kg	(Iran) Sina Karimian	def.	(Japan) Hidetaka Arato	Decision (unanimous)	3	5:00	
Women's Strawweight 52 kg	(Japan) Machi Fukuda	def.	(Japan) Haruka Hasegawa	Decision (unanimous)	3	5:00	
Bantamweight 61 kg	(Japan) Taichi Nakajima	def.	(Japan) Kosuke Terashima	TKO (punches)	1	1:17	
Bantamweight 61 kg	(Japan) Tatsuya Ando	def.	(Azerbaijan) Magerram Gasanzade	Submission (rear-naked choke)	1	3:33	
Catchweight 64 kg	(Japan) Kuto Ueno	def.	(Thailand) Farphayap Grabs	Decision (unanimous)	3	3:00	Kickboxing bout. Farphayap missed weight (64.9 kg).
Featherweight 66 kg	(Japan) Raiki Endo	def.	(China) Bading Zhaxi	Decision (unanimous)	3	5:00	
Catchweight 55 kg	(Japan) Yuya Uzawa	def.	(Japan) Toshizou	Decision (unanimous)	3	3:00	Kickboxing bout.
Bantamweight 61 kg	(Japan) Kanata Ueno	def.	(Japan) Kensei Yamakawa	Decision (unanimous)	3	3:00	Kickboxing bout.
Opening Ceremony: Rizin MMA Special Rules (5min / 2R).
Catchweight 56 kg	(Japan) Suguru Hayasaka	def.	(Japan) Arashi Suzuki	Submission (toe hold)	1	3:41	
Bantamweight 61 kg	(Japan) Yukito Morinaga	def.	(Japan) Daiki Kobayashi	Technical Submission (arm-triangle choke)	1	0:53	
Catchweight 53 kg	(Japan) Shuto Hayashi	def.	(Japan) Kyohei Nishijima	Decision (unanimous)	3	3:00	Kickboxing bout.
Welterweight 77 kg	(Japan) Takashi Noto	def.	(Japan) Yuki Narita	Submission (armbar)	2	4:50	

== Super Rizin 4 ==
Super Rizin 4
- Promotion: Rizin Fighting Federation
- Date: July 27, 2025
- Venue: Saitama Super Arena
- City: Saitama, Japan

Super Rizin 4 was a combat sports event held by Rizin Fighting Federation on July 27, 2025, at Saitama Super Arena in Saitama, Japan.

=== Background ===
A featherweight rematch between former two-time Rizin Featherweight Champion Kleber Koike Erbst and Mikuru Asakura headlined the event. The pair previously met at Rizin 28 in June 2021, which Koike Erbst won by second round technical submission.

The event featured to complete at the title bout:

- Rizin Bantamweight Championship bout: Naoki Inoue vs. Ryuya Fukuda

The event also featured the quarterfinals and semifinals of 2025 Rizin World Grand Prix Tournament in a flyweight and heavyweight divisions respectively.

On July 4, 2025, it got announced that the Rizin Featherweight Championship bout got cancelled and Razhabali Shaydullaev withdraw since they were unable to secure an opponent in time for a title bout.

On July 21, 2025, it was reported that Karshyga Dautbek got diagnosed with a herniated disc with approximately six weeks of absolute rest and treatment. Therefore, Dautbeck had to withdraw from the match against Kyoma Akimoto due to doctor's orders. He was replaced by Koki Akada.

On July 25, 2025, it got announced that Shin Yu-jin's weight cutting isn't going well and she wouldn't be able to reach the 49kg for the Rizin Women's Super Atomweight Championship match against current champion Seika Izawa, therefore, both sides agreed to a non-title match with a catchweight of 52kg.

=== Results ===
Main card (Rizin.tv)
Weight Class				Method	Round	T.Time	Notes
Featherweight 66 kg	(Japan) Mikuru Asakura	def.	(Brazil) Kleber Koike Erbst	Decision (split)	3	5:00	
Lightweight 71 kg	(Japan) Shunta Nomura	def.	(Brazil) Patricky Pitbull	Decision (unanimous)	3	5:00	
Featherweight 66 kg	(Japan) YA-MAN	def.	(Japan) Masanori Kanehara	KO (punches)	3	2:51	
Catchweight 68 kg	(Japan) Kyoma Akimoto	def.	(Japan) Koki Akada	Submission (rear-naked choke)	1	2:57	
Intermission (Rizin.tv)
Bantamweight 61 kg	(Japan) Naoki Inoue (c)	def.	(Japan) Ryuya Fukuda	Decision (unanimous)	3	5:00	For the Rizin Bantamweight Championship.
Strawweight 52 kg	(Japan) Seika Izawa	def.	(South Korea) Shin Yu-jin	Submission (arm-triangle choke)	1	2:24	Shin missed weight (52.85 kg).
Bantamweight 61 kg	(Japan) Tatsuya Ando	def.	(South Korea) Yang Ji-yong	Submission (rear-naked choke)	2	3:52	
Super Atomweight 49 kg	(Japan) Moeri Suda	def.	(Japan) Noeru Narita	Submission (armbar)	2	3:02	
Intermission: 2025 Rizin World Grand Prix Tournament
Heavyweight 120 kg	(Russia) Alexander Soldatkin	def.	(Japan) Mikio Ueda	TKO (punches)	2	3:05	2025 Rizin Heavyweight Grand Prix Semifinal.
Heavyweight 120 kg	(Poland) Marek Samociuk	def.	(Brazil) José Augusto Azevedo	Decision (unanimous)	3	5:00	2025 Rizin Heavyweight Grand Prix Semifinal.
Flyweight 57 kg	(Japan) Makoto Takahashi	def.	(Japan) Erson Yamamoto	Submission (guillotine choke)	1	2:55	2025 Rizin Flyweight Grand Prix Quarterfinal.
Flyweight 57 kg	(Russia) Alibek Gadzhammatov	def.	(Japan) Takaki Soya	TKO (punches)	3	2:39	2025 Rizin Flyweight Grand Prix Quarterfinal.
Flyweight 57 kg	(Japan) Yuki Ito	def.	(South Africa) Nkazimulo Zulu	Decision (unanimous)	3	5:00	2025 Rizin Flyweight Grand Prix Quarterfinal.
Flyweight 57 kg	(Japan) Hiromasa Ougikubo	def.	(United States) Jose Torres	Decision (unanimous)	3	5:00	2025 Rizin Flyweight Grand Prix Quarterfinal.
Flyweight 57 kg	(Japan) Yuki Motoya	def.	(Japan) Hiroya Kondo	Decision (unanimous)	3	5:00	2025 Rizin Flyweight Grand Prix Quarterfinal.
Opening Ceremony (YouTube / Rizin.tv)
Catchweight 68 kg	(Japan) Takahiro Ashida	def.	(Japan) Naoki Tanaka	Decision (unanimous)	3	5:00	
Heavyweight 120 kg	(Japan) Satoshi Kamiyama	def.	(Japan) Masashi Inada	TKO (punches and elbows)	2	2:29	
Catchweight 62 kg	(Japan) Shogo Kuriaki	def.	(Japan) Taiga Kawabe	Decision (unanimous)	3	5:00	

== Rizin 51 ==
Rizin 51
- Promotion: Rizin Fighting Federation
- Date: September 28, 2025
- Venue: Aichi International Arena
- City: Nagoya, Japan

Rizin 51 was a combat sports event held by Rizin Fighting Federation on September 28, 2025, at Aichi International Arena in Nagoya, Japan.

=== Background ===
A Rizin Lightweight Championship bout between current champion Roberto de Souza and Shunta Nomura was scheduled to headline the event. However on August 1, it was reported that Nomura is not medically cleared to compete in September after his win over Patricky Pitbull at Super Rizin 4. Therefore, Yoshinori Horie competed against de Souza for the belt.

A Rizin Featherweight Championship bout between current champion Razhabali Shaydullaev and Viktor Kolesnik served as the co-main event.

=== Results ===
Main card (Rizin.tv)
Weight Class				Method	Round	T.Time	Notes
Lightweight 71 kg	(Brazil) Roberto de Souza (c)	def	(Japan) Yoshinori Horie	Submission (rear-naked choke)	1	1:40	For the Rizin Lightweight Championship.
Featherweight 66 kg	(Kyrgyzstan) Razhabali Shaydullaev (c)	def.	(Russia) Viktor Kolesnik	TKO (punches)	1	:33	For the Rizin Featherweight Championship.
Flyweight 57 kg	(Japan) Hiromasa Ougikubo	def.	(Russia) Alibek Gadzhammatov	Decision (unanimous)	3	5:00	2025 Rizin Flyweight Grand Prix Semifinal.
Flyweight 57 kg	(Japan) Yuki Motoya	def.	(Japan) Makoto Takahashi	Decision (unanimous)	3	5:00	2025 Rizin Flyweight Grand Prix Semifinal.
Flyweight 57 kg	(Japan) Erson Yamamoto	def.	(Japan) Yuki Ito	Decision (unanimous)	3	5:00	2025 Rizin Flyweight Grand Prix Reserve bout.
Intermission (Rizin.tv)
Heavyweight 120 kg	(Russia) Alexander Soldatkin	def.	(Poland) Marek Samociuk	Decision (unanimous)	3	5:00	2025 Rizin Heavyweight Grand Prix Final.
Bantamweight 61 kg	(United States) Danny Sabatello	def.	(Japan) Shoko Sato	Decision (split)	3	5:00	
Bantamweight 61 kg	(Japan) Genji Umeno	def.	(Japan) Ryusei Ashizawa	Decision (unanimous)	3	5:00	
Featherweight 66 kg	(Japan) Ryo Takagi	def.	(Japan) Kisa Miyake	Decision (unanimous)	3	5:00	
Lightweight 71 kg	(Japan) Yusuke Yachi	def.	(Ghana) Bilal Kai Haga	Submission (rear-naked choke)	2	2:09	
Featherweight 66 kg	(Japan) Hiroaki Suzuki	def.	(China) Huang Yuele	Decision (split)	3	5:00	
Flyweight 57 kg	(Japan) Daichi Tomizawa	def.	(Japan) Joe Hiramoto	Decision (split)	3	5:00	
Catchweight 100 kg	(Senegal) Thiatou Bambilor	def.	(Japan) Kosuke Kindaichi	Decision (unanimous)	3	5:00	
Featherweight 66 kg	(Japan) Takahiro Okuyama	def.	(Japan) Tetsuya Yamato	Submission (armbar)	1	4:10	
Opening Ceremony: Rizin MMA Special Rules (5min / 2R).
Lightweight 71 kg	(Japan) Kosuke Sugimura	def.	(Japan) Shogo Ota	Decision (unanimous)	2	5:00	
Bantamweight 61 kg	(Japan) Kushi Ishizaka	def.	(Japan) Mahiro Yamaki	Decision (unanimous)	2	5:00	
Flyweight 57 kg	(Japan) Daisuke Kobayashi	def.	(Japan) Syuto Sato	Decision (unanimous)	2	5:00	
Featherweight 66 kg	(Japan) Yuhei Tsuda	def.	(Japan) Jin Wakita	Decision (unanimous)	2	5:00	

== Rizin Landmark 12 ==
Rizin Landmark 12
- Promotion: Rizin Fighting Federation
- Date: November 3, 2025
- Venue: Glion Arena Kobe
- City: Kobe, Japan

Rizin Landmark 12 was a combat sports event held by Rizin Fighting Federation on November 3, 2025, at Glion Arena Kobe in Kobe, Japan.

=== Background ===
A featherweight bout between Kyohei Hagiwara and Kyoma Akimoto headlined the event.

A Rizin Super Atomweight Championship bout between current champion Seika Izawa and Saori Oshima served as the co-main event.

=== Results ===
Main card (Rizin.tv)
Weight Class				Method	Round	T.Time	Notes
Featherweight 66 kg	(Japan) Kyoma Akimoto	def.	(Japan) Kyohei Hagiwara	TKO (punches)	2	3:52	
Super Atomweight 49 kg	(Japan) Seika Izawa (c)	def.	(Japan) Saori Oshima	Decision (unanimous)	3	5:00	For the Rizin Super Atomweight Championship.
Featherweight 66 kg	(Japan) Kazumasa Majima	def.	(Japan) Shuya Kimura	Submission (rear-naked choke)	2	2:54	
Catchweight 50 kg	(Japan) Kate Oyama	def.	(South Korea) Lee Bo-mi	Decision (unanimous)	3	5:00	
Intermission (Rizin.tv)
Lightweight 71 kg	(Japan) Taisei Sakuraba	def.	(Japan) Sho Patrick Usami	Submission (kneebar)	3	1:33	
Bantamweight 61 kg	(Japan) Joji Goto	def.	(Japan) Taichi Nakajima	KO (punch)	1	1:49	
Heavyweight 120 kg	(Japan) Satoshi Kamiyama	def.	(Japan) Max Yoshida	TKO (punches and elbows)	1	1:10	
Catchweight 62 kg	(Japan) Yuto Hokamura	def.	(China) Li Yunfeng	Submission (heel hook)	1	1:34	
Lightweight 71 kg	(Kazakhstan) Nurkhan Zhumagazy	def.	(Japan) Hyuma Yasui	Submission (brabo choke)	1	1:00	
Bantamweight 61 kg	(Japan) Jinnosuke Kashimura	def.	(Japan) Hyuma Yasui	Decision (unanimous)	3	5:00	
Lightweight 71 kg	(South Korea) Ki Won-bin	def.	(Japan) Shutaro Debana	Decision (unanimous)	3	5:00	
Flyweight 57 kg	(Canada) Tony Laramie	def.	(Japan) Wataru Yamauchi	Decision (unanimous)	3	5:00	Yamauchi missed weight (57.3 kg).
Catchweight 51 kg	(Japan) King Rikuto	def.	(Japan) Yumeto Mizuno	TKO (punches)	1	2:06	Kickboxing bout.
Super Atomweight 49 kg	(Japan) Noeru Narita	def.	(Japan) Misaki Suda	Submission (armbar)	2	2:46	Rizin MMA Special Rules (5min / 2R).
Flyweight 57 kg	(Japan) Daichi Akahira	def.	(Japan) Shoma	Decision (unanimous)	3	3:00	Kickboxing bout.
Opening Ceremony: Kickboxing bouts (YouTube)
Bantamweight 61 kg	(Japan) Hyuga Miyagawa	def.	(Japan) Shinsuke Matsubara	Submission (rear-naked choke)	1	1:52	Rizin MMA Special Rules (5min / 2R).
Catchweight 63 kg	(Japan) Shinpei Hayashi	def.	(Japan) Motoki	Decision (unanimous)	3	3:00	
Catchweight 51 kg	(Japan) Nanoka Ito	def.	(Japan) Miichan	Decision (unanimous)	3	3:00	

== Rizin: Shiwasu no Cho Tsuwamono Matsuri ==
Rizin: Shiwasu no Cho Tsuwamono Matsuri
- Promotion: Rizin Fighting Federation
- Date: December 31, 2025
- Venue: Saitama Super Arena
- City: Saitama, Japan

Rizin: Shiwasu no Cho Tsuwamono Matsuri was a combat sports event that was held by Rizin Fighting Federation on December 31, 2025, at Saitama Super Arena in Saitama, Japan.

=== Background ===
A heavyweight bout between 2025 Rizin Heavyweight Grand Prix winner Alexander Soldatkin and former two-time Bellator MMA champion Ryan Bader for the inaugural Rizin Heavyweight Championship was expected to take place at this event. However, Bader withdrew due to multiple injuries in his hip and groin.

=== Results ===
Main card (Rizin.tv)
Weight Class				Method	Round	T.Time	Notes
Featherweight 66 kg	(Kyrgyzstan) Razhabali Shaydullaev (c)	def.	(Japan) Mikuru Asakura	TKO (punches)	1	2:54	For the Rizin Featherweight Championship.
Lightweight 71 kg	(Uzbekistan) Ilkhom Nozimov	def.	(Brazil) Roberto de Souza (c)	KO (knee)	1	0:13	For the Rizin Lightweight Championship.
Intermission (Rizin.tv)
Flyweight 57 kg	(Japan) Hiromasa Ougikubo	def.	(Japan) Yuki Motoya	Decision (unanimous)	3	5:00	2025 Rizin Flyweight Grand Prix Final. For the vacant Rizin Flyweight Championship.
Bantamweight 61 kg	(United States) Danny Sabatello	def.	(Japan) Naoki Inoue (c)	Decision (split)	3	5:00	For the Rizin Bantamweight Championship.
Super Atomweight 49 kg	(Japan) Seika Izawa (c)	def.	(Japan) Rena Kubota	Submission (guillotine choke)	2	1:58	For the Rizin Super Atomweight Championship.
Featherweight 66 kg	(Brazil) Kleber Koike Erbst	def.	(Azerbaijan) Vugar Karamov	Decision (unanimous)	3	5:00	
Intermission (Rizin.tv)
Bantamweight 61 kg	(Japan) Ryuya Fukuda	def.	(Japan) Tatsuya Ando	KO (punches)	2	3:02	
Featherweight 66 kg	(Japan) Kyoma Akimoto	def.	(Japan) Suguru Nii	KO (knee to the body)	1	3:45	
Featherweight 66 kg	(Kazakhstan) Karshyga Dautbek	vs.	(Japan) Yuta Kubo	No Contest (accidental eye poke)	1	3:15	Accidental eye poke rendered Dautbek unable to continue.
Flyweight 57 kg	(Japan) Makoto Takahashi	def.	(Japan) Hiroya Kondo	Decision (unanimous)	3	5:00	
Flyweight 57 kg	(Japan) Joji Goto	def.	(United States) Jose Torres	Decision (split)	3	5:00	
Flyweight 57 kg	(Japan) Tatsuki Shinotsuka	def.	(Japan) Daichi Tomizawa	KO (punches)	2	3:22	
Catchweight 73 kg	(Japan) Tatsuya Saika	def.	(United States) BeyNoah	KO (head kick)	1	0:32	
Bantamweight 61 kg	(Japan) Ryoma Shishimoto	def.	(Japan) Ryusei Ashizawa	Submission (armbar)	1	0:25	
Opening Ceremony: DELiGHTWORKS present RIZIN Koshien 2025 Final
Flyweight 57 kg	(Brazil) Enzo Massami Iamazato	def.	(Japan) Yuri Suda	Technical Submission (armbar)	1	3:15	

== See also ==
- List of current Rizin FF fighters
- 2025 in UFC
- 2025 in ONE Championship
- 2025 in Professional Fighters League
- 2025 in Cage Warriors
- 2025 in Absolute Championship Akhmat
- 2025 in Konfrontacja Sztuk Walki
- 2025 in Legacy Fighting Alliance
- 2025 in LUX Fight League
- 2025 in Oktagon MMA
- 2025 in Brave Combat Federation
- 2025 in UAE Warriors
