= Roberto de Souza =

Japanese mixed martial artist

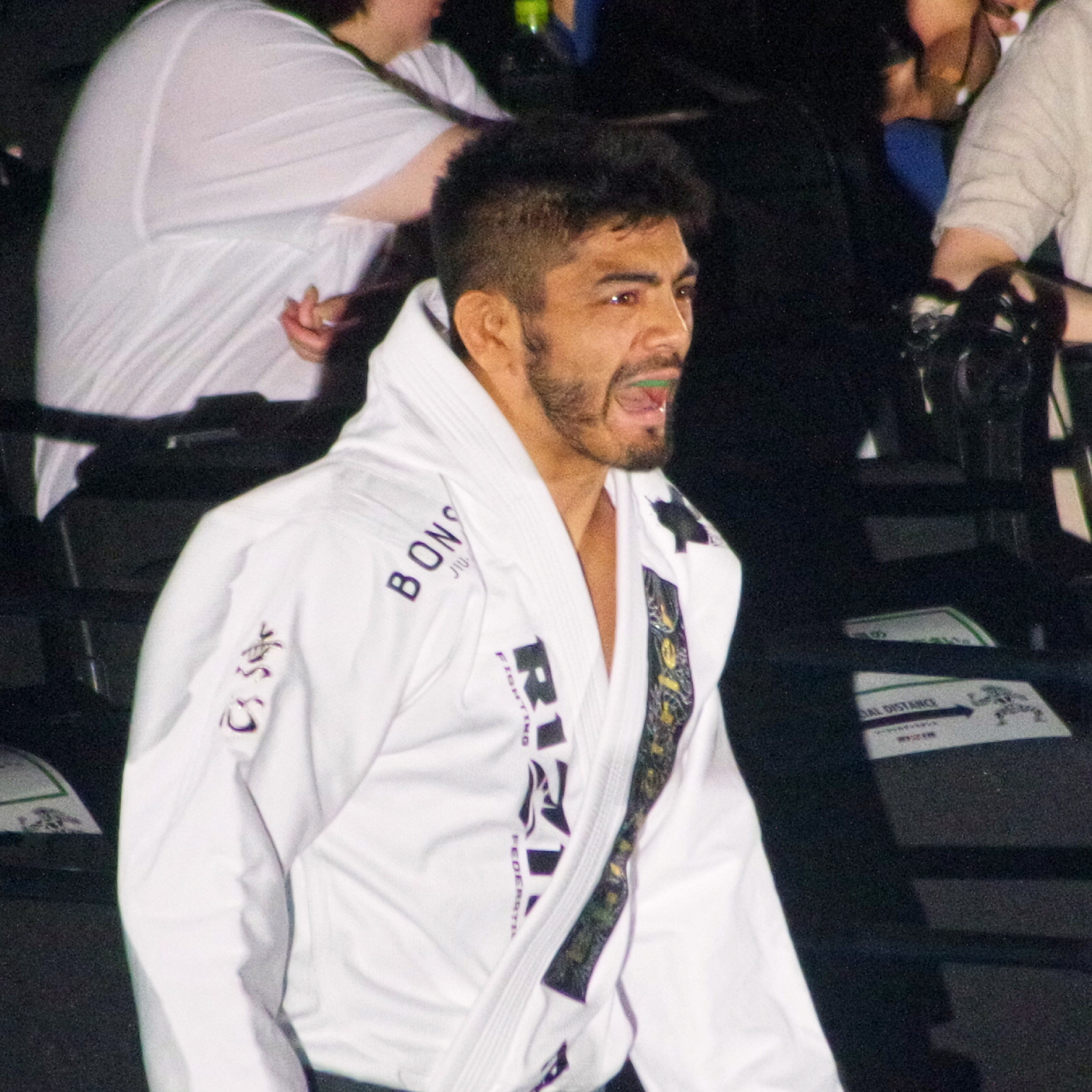
- Born: Roberto Satoshi de Souza; September 19, 1989 (age 37); São Paulo, Brazil
- Nationality: Japanese; Brazilian (expatriate)
- Height: 5 ft 11 in (1.80 m)
- Weight: 156 lb (71 kg; 11 st 2 lb)
- Division: Lightweight
- Reach: 73 in (185 cm)
- Style: Brazilian Jiu-Jitsu, Submission Wrestling, Judo
- Fighting out of: Iwata, Japan
- Team: Bonsai Jiu-Jitsu
- Rank: Black Belt in Brazilian jiu-jitsu
- Years active: 2013–present

Mixed martial arts record
- Total: 25
- Wins: 21
- By knockout: 6
- By submission: 13
- By decision: 2
- Losses: 4
- By knockout: 3
- By decision: 1

Other information
- Notable relatives: Marcos Yoshio de Souza (brother)
- Mixed martial arts record from Sherdog

Roberto de Souza

YouTube information
- Channel: ホベルト サトシ ソウザ Roberto Satoshi Souza
- Years active: 2021-present
- Genre: entertainment
- Subscribers: 26,800
- Views: 3.17 million
- Last updated: 4 August 2026

Roberto de Souza
Medal record

Men's Brazilian Jiu-Jitsu

Representing Brazil

World IBJJF Jiu-Jitsu Championship
Bronze medal – third place	2012 California	76kg
Bronze medal – third place	2014 California	76kg

Abu Dhabi World Professional Jiu-Jitsu Championship
Gold medal – first place	2012 Abu Dhabi	76kg
Gold medal – first place	2014 Abu Dhabi	76kg
Bronze medal – third place	2015 Abu Dhabi	76kg

European Jiu-Jitsu Championship
Gold medal – first place	2012 Lisbon	76kg

Asian Jiu-Jitsu Championship
Gold medal – first place	2014 Tokyo	76kg
Gold medal – first place	2015 Tokyo	76kg

Representing Japan

World IBJJF Jiu-Jitsu Championship
Silver medal – second place	2017 California	76kg

Abu Dhabi World Professional Jiu-Jitsu Championship
Silver medal – second place	2016 Abu Dhabi	76kg

Asian Jiu-Jitsu Championship
Gold medal – first place	2016 Tokyo	82kg

Roberto Satoshi de Souza (ホベルト・サトシ・ジ・ソウザ, Hoberuto Satoshi Ji Souza; born September 19, 1989) is a Japanese-Brazilian mixed martial artist who competes in the Lightweight division of Rizin Fighting Federation, where he is a former Rizin Lightweight champion.

== Background ==
Roberto Satoshi de Souza was born on September 19, 1989, in Sao Paulo, Brazil to a Brazilian father and Japanese mother and began practicing martial arts with his father at a young age, starting with Judo and later progressing to Jiu-Jitsu. He quickly gained success in the junior divisions of BJJ, winning multiple championships including the World Championship in both his weight category and the open weight category. However, after 2006, the World Jiu-Jitsu Championship was held in California, US and Roberto struggled to secure sponsorships to compete abroad, leading to a temporary absence from the sport. He returned in 2009 and had a successful run for the world title. Roberto later visited Japan to see his brother Mauricio, who had opened an academy there, and decided to stay permanently. To make ends meet, he worked in factories before eventually being able to make a living through competing and teaching Jiu-Jitsu. On May 1, 2011, Roberto received his black belt from his father, Adilson de Souza, who died from an illness shortly after the ceremony.

He is married to a fellow Japanese Brazilian, Yuri Suzuki de Souza, and has two daughters.

== Brazilian Jiu-Jitsu grappling ==
In July 2006, he won the Sao Paulo jiu-jitsu championship in two classes, blue belt medio class and absolute class. In September 2007, he came to Japan following his older brothers Mauricio Dai Souza and Marcos Yoshio Souza, and moved to Hamamatsu City, Shizuoka Prefecture at the age of 18. When he first came to Japan, he worked as a factory worker while practicing and teaching at a bull terrier martial arts gym with his two older brothers.

On December 2, 2007, Satoshi participated in the DEEP X 02 Real King Tournament in the 76 kg class, winning the championship after defeating Takayuki Muramatsu, Kei Ouchi, and Sotaro Yamada in successive rounds.

In June 2009 and 2010, Satoshi won the World Jiu-Jitsu Championship in the purple and brown belt Lightweight categories, respectively.

On October 10, 2010, the subject participated in the DEEP X 06 Brazilian Jiu-Jitsu Super Tournament in the 75 kg class, defeating three black belt holders, Kei Ochi, Tetsuya Kondo, and Koji Shimazaki to win the championship.

In May 2011, Satoshi was awarded a black belt in Brazilian Jiu-Jitsu by their father.

In April 2012, Satoshi won the gold medals at the Abu Dhabi World Professional Jiu-Jitsu Championship in the black belt Lightweight, defeating Davi Ramos and Lucas Lepri.

Facing Jake Shields on November 22, 2014, at Metamorphis 5, Satoshi drew with Shields as time expired, before returning at Metamoris 6 on May 9, 2015, where he faced Clark Gracie and drew once again due to time expiration.

In June 2017, the subject faced Lucas Lepri in the World Jiu-Jitsu Championship black belt lightweight final, but withdrew due to a shoulder injury and finished as runner-up.

On June 9, 2018, Satoshi participated in QUINTET FIGHT NIGHT in TOKYO as part of "TEAM HALEO", defeating Daisuke Nakamura, David Garmo, and Yoshihiko Matsumoto before going to a timed daw with Masahiro Iwasaki. On October 5, 2018, the subject participated in QUINTET.3 as part of "TEAM SAKURABA", drawing with Gordon Ryan of TEAM ALPHA MALE.

== Mixed martial arts career ==
He made his mixed martial arts debut on October 20, 2013, at the Real Fight MMA Championship 3 in China, before winning his sophomore performance against Doo Je Jung in December 2014 via rear-naked choke. On December 5, 2015, he faced Ryuki Ueyama in the first round of the REAL.3 super lightweight (74.2 kg) throne decision tournament, winning by arm-triangle choke. On March 12, 2016, he faced Yuta Kaneko in the semi-finals of the REAL.4 Super Lightweight Championship Tournament and won by TKO via ground and pound. On June 12, 2016, he faced Pat Ayuyu in the final of the REAL Super Lightweight Tournament, successfully winning the title and the tournament via first round armbar submission.

=== Rizin Fighting Federation ===
After winning two bouts under the Arzalet banner via first round rear-naked chokes, Satoshi made his Rizin FF debut on April 21, 2019, when he faced Satoru Kitaoka at Rizin 15, winning by TKO in the second round via ground and pound.

On July 28, 2019, he faced Mizuto Hirota at Rizin 17 and won by knockout in the first round. During his post-fight mic performance, he yelled, "This is not UFC, this is RIZIN! "

On October 12, 2019, he faced Johnny Case in the Lightweight Grand Prix Quarterfinal at Rizin 19. He received an eye-poke in his left eye, and was tapped out 75 seconds after the start of the match. It was the first loss of his career.

On August 9, 2020, he faced Yusuke Yaji at Rizin 22 and won by first round TKO stoppage.

Satoshi faced Kazuki Tokudome at Rizin 27 on March 21, 2021. After getting taken down, he quickly submitted Tokudome via triangle choke in the first round.

On June 13, 2021, he faced RIZIN Lightweight World Grand Prix Champion Tofiq Musayev for the inaugural Rizin Lightweight Championship at Rizin 28 . In the 1st round, he won the ippon with a triangular choke and succeeded in winning his first title. During the national anthem before the bout, he chose Kimigayo instead of the Brazilian national anthem.

On December 31, 2021, he rematched the challenger Yusuke Yaji in the RIZIN lightweight title match at Rizin 33. He made his first successful defense of the throne .

On April 17, 2022, in the RIZIN lightweight title match of Rizin 35, he rematched the challenger Johnny Case for the first time in about two and a half years, and won in the first round via reverse triangle armbar. Succeeded in his revenge and successfully defended the title for the second time.

Satoshi faced former Bellator Featherweight World Champion A. J. McKee in a non-title bout at Bellator MMA vs. Rizin on December 31, 2022. Although there were many submission attempts made by de Souza, McKee had more offense and won the bout by unanimous decision.

Satoshi faced Spike Carlyle in a non-title bout at Rizin 42 on May 6, 2023. He won the fight by unanimous decision.

Replacing an injured A.J. McKee, de Souza faced former Bellator Lightweight World Champion Patricky Pitbull in the Bellator Lightweight World Grand Prix Quarter-Final as part of Bellator MMA x Rizin 2 on July 30, 2023. He lost the bout by a leg kick technical knockout.

Satoshi fought Keita Nakamura in a non-title bout in the main event of RIZIN Landmark 9 on March 23, 2024. He won the fight by corner stoppage in the first round after dropping Nakamura with a head kick.

Souza defended the RIZIN FF lightweight title against Luiz Gustavo at RIZIN 48 on September 29, 2024. He won the bout via technical knockout 21 second into the first round.

Souza defended the RIZIN FF lightweight title against former Rizin Featherweight Champion Vugar Karamov at Rizin 49 on December 31, 2024. He won the bout via triangle choke submission in the first round.

Souza faced Ki Won-bin in a non-title bout at Rizin World Series in Korea on May 31, 2025, and won via technical submission in the first round.

Souza defended the RIZIN lightweight title against Yoshinori Horie at Rizin 51 on September 28, 2025. He won the bout via submission in the first round.

Souza faced Ilkhom Nozimov at Rizin: Shiwasu no Cho Tsuwamono Matsuri on December 31, 2025. He lost the title by KO in the first round.

Souza is scheduled to face Shunta Nomura on September 10, 2026 at Super Rizin 5.

== Championships and accomplishments ==
=== Mixed martial arts ===
- Rizin Fighting Federation
  - Rizin Lightweight Championship (One time)
    - Five successful title defenses
- Real Fight Championship
  - RFC Super Lightweight Champship

== Mixed martial arts record ==
Professional record breakdown
25 matches	21 wins	4 losses
By knockout	6	3
By submission	13	0
By decision	2	1

Res.	Record	Opponent	Method	Event	Date	Round	Time	Location	Notes
Win	21–4	Shunta Nomura	Decision (unanimous)	Super Rizin 5	September 10, 2026	3	5:00	Osaka, Japan	
Loss	20–4	Ilkhom Nozimov	KO (knee)	Rizin: Shiwasu no Cho Tsuwamono Matsuri	December 31, 2025	1	0:13	Saitama, Japan	Lost the Rizin Lightweight Championship.
Win	20–3	Yoshinori Horie	Submission (rear-naked choke)	Rizin 51	September 28, 2025	1	1:40	Nagoya, Japan	Defended the Rizin Lightweight Championship.
Win	19–3	Ki Won-bin	Technical Submission (rear-naked choke)	Rizin World Series in Korea	May 31, 2025	1	0:50	Incheon, South Korea	Non-title bout.
Win	18–3	Vugar Karamov	Submission (triangle choke)	Rizin 49	December 31, 2024	1	4:45	Saitama, Japan	Defended the Rizin Lightweight Championship.
Win	17–3	Luiz Gustavo	TKO (punches)	Rizin 48	September 29, 2024	1	0:21	Saitama, Japan	Defended the Rizin Lightweight Championship.
Win	16–3	Keita Nakamura	TKO (corner stoppage)	Rizin Landmark 9	March 23, 2024	1	1:43	Kobe, Japan	Non-title bout.
Loss	15–3	Patricky Pitbull	TKO (leg kick)	Bellator MMA x Rizin 2	July 30, 2023	3	0:49	Saitama, Japan	Catchweight (161 lb) bout. Bellator Lightweight World Grand Prix Quarterfinal.
Win	15–2	Spike Carlyle	Decision (unanimous)	Rizin 42	May 6, 2023	3	5:00	Tokyo, Japan	Non-title bout.
Loss	14–2	A. J. McKee	Decision (unanimous)	Bellator MMA vs. Rizin	December 31, 2022	3	5:00	Saitama, Japan	Non-title bout.
Win	14–1	Johnny Case	Submission (reverse triangle armbar)	Rizin 35	April 17, 2022	1	3:32	Chōfu, Japan	Defended the Rizin Lightweight Championship.
Win	13–1	Yusuke Yachi	Submission (triangle choke)	Rizin 33	December 31, 2021	2	3:30	Saitama, Japan	Defended the Rizin Lightweight Championship.
Win	12–1	Tofiq Musayev	Submission (triangle choke)	Rizin 28	June 13, 2021	1	1:12	Tokyo, Japan	Won the inaugural Rizin Lightweight Championship.
Win	11–1	Kazuki Tokudome	Submission (triangle choke)	Rizin 27	March 21, 2021	1	1:44	Nagoya, Japan	
Win	10–1	Yusuke Yachi	TKO (punches)	Rizin 22	August 9, 2020	1	1:52	Yokohama, Japan	
Loss	9–1	Johnny Case	TKO (punch)	Rizin 19	October 12, 2019	1	1:15	Osaka, Japan	2019 Rizin Lightweight Grand Prix Quarterfinal.
Win	9–0	Mizuto Hirota	KO (punches)	Rizin 17	July 28, 2019	1	3:05	Tokyo, Japan	
Win	8–0	Satoru Kitaoka	TKO (punches)	Rizin 15	April 21, 2019	2	3:56	Yokohama, Japan	Lightweight debut.
Win	7–0	Baek Seung-dae	Submission (rear-naked choke)	Arzalet Fighting 4	November 24, 2018	1	1:06	Seoul, South Korea	Catchweight (164 lb) bout.
Win	6–0	Thiago Oliveira	Submission (rear-naked choke)	Arzalet Fighting 2	October 21, 2017	1	3:00	Curitiba, Brazil	
Win	5–0	Pat Ayuyu	Submission (armbar)	Real Fight Championship 5	June 12, 2016	1	1:54	Tokyo, Japan	Won the RFC Super Lightweight Championship.
Win	4–0	Yuta Kaneko	TKO (punches)	Real Fight Championship 4	March 12, 2016	1	2:06	Tokyo, Japan	
Win	3–0	Ryuki Ueyama	Submission (arm-triangle choke)	Real Fight Championship 3	December 5, 2015	1	2:13	Yokohama, Japan	
Win	2–0	Jung Doo-je	Submission (rear-naked choke)	Real Fight Championship 1	December 23, 2014	1	1:05	Tokyo, Japan	
Win	1–0	Nuerla Murati	Submission (rear-naked choke)	Real Fight MMA Championship 3	October 20, 2013	1	2:37	Beijing, China	Super Lightweight debut.

== See also ==
- List of current Rizin FF fighters
- List of male mixed martial artists
