= 2024 in Rizin Fighting Federation =

Information
- First date: February 24, 2024
- Last date: December 31, 2024

Events
- Total events: 6

Fights
- Total fights: 107
- Title fights: 8

Chronology
2023 in Rizin Fighting Federation	2024 in Rizin Fighting Federation	2025 in Rizin Fighting Federation

The year 2024 was the tenth year in the history of the Rizin Fighting Federation, a mixed martial arts promotion based in Japan.

== List of events ==
Rizin Fighting Federation
#	Event	Date	Venue	Location	Attendance
1	Rizin Landmark 8	February 24, 2024	Saga Arena	Saga, Japan	7,758
2	Rizin Landmark 9	March 23, 2024	World Memorial Hall	Kobe, Japan	
3	Rizin 46	April 29, 2024	Ariake Arena	Tokyo, Japan	
4	Rizin 47	June 9, 2024	Yoyogi National Gymnasium	Tokyo, Japan	
5	Super Rizin 3	July 28, 2024	Saitama Super Arena	Saitama, Japan	
6	Rizin 48	September 29, 2024	Saitama Super Arena	Saitama, Japan	
7	Rizin Landmark 10	November 17, 2024	Nagoya International Exhibition Hall	Nagoya, Japan	
8	Rizin 49	December 31, 2024	Saitama Super Arena	Saitama, Japan	

== Title fights ==
Title fights in 2024
Weight class				Method	Round	Time	Event	Notes
Featherweight	Chihiro Suzuki (c)	def.	Masanori Kanehara	TKO (punches)	1	4:28	Rizin 46	(Note: For the Rizin Featherweight Championship.)
Bantamweight	Naoki Inoue	def.	Kim Soo-chul	TKO (punches)	1	3:55	Rizin 48	(Note: For the vacant Rizin Bantamweight Championship.)
Lightweight	Roberto de Souza (c)	def.	Luiz Gustavo	TKO (punches)	1	0:21	Rizin 48	(Note: For the Rizin Lightweight Championship.)
Lightweight	Roberto de Souza (c)	def.	Vugar Karamov	Submission (triangle choke)	1	4:45	Rizin 49	(Note: For the Rizin Lightweight Championship.)
Flyweight	Kyoji Horiguchi (c)	def.	Nkazimulo Zulu	Decision (unanimous)	3	5:00	Rizin 49	(Note: For the Rizin Flyweight Championship.)
Featherweight	Kleber Koike Erbst	def.	Chihiro Suzuki (c)	Decision (unanimous)	3	5:00	Rizin 49	(Note: For the Rizin Featherweight Championship.)

== Rizin Landmark 8 ==
Rizin Landmark 8 in Saga
- Promotion: Rizin Fighting Federation
- Date: February 24, 2024
- Venue: Saga Arena
- City: Saga, Japan
- Attendance: 7,758

Rizin Landmark 8 was a Combat sport event held by Rizin Fighting Federation on February 24, 2024, at the Saga Arena in Saga, Japan.

=== Background ===
The event marked the organization's first visit to Saga Prefecture.

A lightweight bout between Luiz Gustavo and Yoshinori Horie headlined the event.

A featherweight bout between former champion Vugar Karamov and former Rebel FC Featherweight champion Kazumasa Majima was expected to take place at the event. However, Karamov withdrew from the bout due to his inability to travel to Japan and was replaced by Masakazu Imanari.

A lightweight bout between former Shooto Pacific Rim Lightweight champion Yusuke Yachi and former HEAT Lightweight champion Kim Kyung-pyo was expected to take place at the event. However Kim withdrew from the bout due to knee injury and was replaced by Rikuto Shirakawa.

A super atomweight bout between former two-time champion Ayaka Hamasaki and former title challenger Claire Lopez was expected to take place at the event. However Hamasaki withdrew from the bout due to forearm fracture and was replaced by current DEEP Microweight champion Saori Oshima.

=== Results ===
Rizin Landmark 8
Weight Class				Method	Round	T.Time	Notes
Lightweight 71 kg	(Brazil) Luiz Gustavo	def.	(Japan) Yoshinori Horie	Decision (unanimous)	3	5:00	
Featherweight 66 kg	(Japan) Masakazu Imanari	def.	(Japan) Kazumasa Majima	Submission (armbar)	2	1:37	
Lightweight 71 kg	(Japan) Yusuke Yachi	def.	(Japan) Rikuto Shirakawa	Technical Submission (face crank)	2	5:00	
W.Super Atomweight 49 kg	(Japan) Saori Oshima	def.	(France) Claire Lopez	Submission (armbar)	2	3:18	
Intermission
Featherweight 66 kg	(Japan) Hiroaki Suzuki	def.	(Japan) Takahiro Ashida	TKO (soccer kicks and punches)	1	4:29	
Welterweight 77 kg	(Japan) Daichi Abe	def.	(Japan) Kota Ossman	KO (punch)	1	1:35	
Bantamweight 61 kg	(Japan) Shohei Nose	def	(Japan) Kenta Takizawa	TKO (elbows)	2	2:48	
Flyweight 57 kg	(Japan) Yuki Ito	def.	(Japan) Masatoshi Ueda	Decision (unanimous)	3	5:00	
Catchweight 58 kg	(Japan) Takumi Terada	def.	(Japan) Takekiyo Tominaga	TKO (three knockdowns)	1	1:54	Kickboxing rules.
Opening Ceremony
Catchweight 60 kg	(Japan) Ryuhei Sakai	def.	(Japan) Ryoga Fukuchi	Decision (split)	2	5:00	RIZIN MMA Special rules.
Bantamweight 61 kg	(Japan) Daiki Yahiro	def.	(Japan) Yuto Araki	Submission (rear-naked choke)	1	2:36	RIZIN MMA Special rules.
Catchweight 62.5 kg	(Japan) Reito Bravely	def.	(Japan) Kyohei Furumura	KO (punch)	1	1:49	Kickboxing rules.
Catchweight 62.5 kg	(Japan) Rikito	def.	(Japan) Hannya Hashimoto	Decision (unanimous)	3	3:00	Kickboxing rules.
Catchweight 53 kg	(Japan) Satoshi Katashima	def.	(Japan) Keito Ishigo	Decision (split)	3	3:00	Kickboxing rules.

== Rizin Landmark 9 ==
Rizin Landmark 9 in Kobe
- Promotion: Rizin Fighting Federation
- Date: March 23, 2024
- Venue: World Memorial Hall
- City: Kobe, Japan

Rizin Landmark 9 was a Combat sport event held by Rizin Fighting Federation on March 23, 2024, at the World Memorial Hall in Kobe, Japan.

=== Background ===
The event was originally referred to as Rizin 46. At the press conference on January 31, it was announced that the March event will now be referred to as Rizin Landmark 9 while RIZIN 46 will take place in April.

A lightweight non-title bout between current champion Roberto Satoshi Souza and UFC veteran Keita Nakamura headlined the event.

=== Results ===
Rizin Landmark 9
Weight Class				Method	Round	T.Time	Notes
Lightweight 71 kg	(Brazil) Roberto Satoshi Souza (c)	def.	(Japan) Keita Nakamura	TKO (corner stoppage)	1	1:43	Non-title bout.
Featherweight 66 kg	(Japan) Koji Takeda	def.	(Japan) Kyohei Hagiwara	Decision (unanimous)	3	5:00	
Bantamweight 61 kg	(Japan) Naoki Inoue	def.	(Japan) Shoko Sato	Decision (unanimous)	3	5:00	
W.Super Atomweight 49 kg	(Japan) Rena Kubota	def.	(South Korea) Shim Yu-ri	Decision (unanimous)	3	5:00	
Intermission
Flyweight 57 kg	(Japan) Yuya Shibata	def.	(Japan) Erson Yamamoto	Submission (kneebar)	1	1:45	
Bantamweight 61 kg	(Japan) Yuto Hokamura	def.	(Japan) Daiki Tsubota	Decision (unanimous)	3	5:00	
Heavyweight 120 kg	(Japan) Takakenshin	def.	(United States) Cody Jerabek	TKO (punches)	1	2:58	
Featherweight 66 kg	(Japan) Yuta Kubo	def.	(Japan) Ryogo Takahashi	Decision (split)	3	5:00	
Catchweight 74 kg	(Thailand) Buakaw Banchamek	ded.	(Brazil) Minoru Kimura	KO (punch)	2	1:10	Kickboxing rules.
Catchweight 70 kg	(Japan) Yuya	def.	(Japan) Masaya Jaki	TKO (referee stoppage)	2	2:25	Kickboxing rules.
Flyweight 57 kg	(Japan) Yusaku Nakamura	def.	(Kazakhstan) Arman Ashimov	Decision (unanimous)	3	5:00	Ashimov missed weight.
Opening Ceremony
Catchweight 53 kg	(Japan) Yuto Uemura	def.	(Japan) Aoi Noda	TKO (referee stoppage)	2	1:35	Kickboxing rules.
Catchweight 57.5 kg	(Japan) Shun Matsuyama	def.	(Japan) Shin Sakurai	KO (punch)	3	1:55	Kickboxing rules.
Catchweight 56.5 kg	(Japan) Daichi Akahira	def.	(Japan) Yuki Yoshioka	Decision (unanimous)	3	3:00	Kickboxing rules.

== Rizin 46 ==
Rizin 46
- Promotion: Rizin Fighting Federation
- Date: April 29, 2024
- Venue: Ariake Arena
- City: Tokyo, Japan

Rizin 46 was a combat sport event held by Rizin Fighting Federation on April 29, 2024, at the Ariake Arena in Tokyo, Japan.

=== Background ===
A Rizin Featherweight Championship bout between current champion Chihiro Suzuki and Masanori Kanehara headlined the event.

A bantamweight bout between former Rizin Featherweight Champion Juntaro Ushiku and 2016 Olympic silver medalist in Greco-Roman wrestling Shinobu Ota served as the co-main event.

=== Results ===
Rizin 46
Weight Class				Method	Round	T.Time	Notes
Featherweight 66 kg	(Japan) Chihiro Suzuki (c)	def.	(Japan) Masanori Kanehara	TKO (punches)	1	4:28	For the Rizin Featherweight Championship.
Bantamweight 61 kg	(Japan) Shinobu Ota	def.	(Japan) Juntaro Ushiku	Decision (unanimous)	3	5:00	
Bantamweight 61 kg	(South Korea) Kim Soo-chul	def.	(Japan) Taichi Nakajima	KO (punches)	2	0:06	
Flyweight 57 kg	(Japan) Makoto Takahashi	def.	(South Korea) Lee Jung-hyun	Submission (arm-triangle choke)	1	4:29	
Bantamweight 61 kg	(Japan) Kazuma Kuramoto	def.	(South Korea) Yang Ji-yong	Decision (split)	3	5:00	
Intermission
Lightweight 71 kg	(United States) BeyNoah	def.	(Japan) Yusaku Inoue	Decision (unanimous)	3	5:00	
Featherweight 66 kg	(Russia) Viktor Kolesnik	def.	(Japan) Yoshiki Nakahara	Decision (unanimous)	3	5:00	
Catchweight 58.9 kg	(Japan) Tatsuki Shinotsuka	def.	(United States) Justyn Martinez	KO (punch)	1	1:33	Bare Knuckle rules. Martinez is Mystery Fighter.
Featherweight 66 kg	(Uzbekistan) Ilkhom Nozimov	def.	(Japan) Sora Yamamoto	TKO (elbows and punches)	2	3:39	
Featherweight 66 kg	(Japan) Ryo Takagi	def.	(Japan) Taisei Nishitani	KO (punch)	1	4:04	

== Rizin 47 ==
Rizin 47
- Promotion: Rizin Fighting Federation
- Date: June 9, 2024
- Venue: Yoyogi National Stadium
- City: Tokyo, Japan

Rizin 47 was a Combat sport event held by Rizin Fighting Federation on June 9, 2024, at the Yoyogi National Stadium in Tokyo, Japan.

=== Background ===
The event was headlined by a bantamweight rematch between the Rizin Flyweight Champion (also former two-time Rizin and Bellator Bantamweight Champion) Kyoji Horiguchi and former Bellator Bantamweight Champion Sergio Pettis. The pair previously met at Bellator 272 in December 2021, where Pettis defended his title by fourth round knockout.

A featherweight bout between former Rizin Featherweight Champion (also former KSW Featherweight Champion) Kleber Koike Erbst and former Rizin and Bellator Bantamweight Champion Juan Archuleta served as the co-main event.

=== Results ===
Rizin 47
Weight Class				Method	Round	T.Time	Notes
Bantamweight 61 kg	(Japan) Kyoji Horiguchi	def.	(United States) Sergio Pettis	Decision (unanimous)	3	5:00	
Featherweight 66 kg	(Japan) Kleber Koike Erbst	def.	(United States) Juan Archuleta	Submission (inverted heel hook)	1	2:25	
Heavyweight 120 kg	(Poland) Przemysław Kowalczyk	def.	(Japan) Mikio Ueda	Submission (armbar)	1	2:08	
Featherweight 66 kg	(Kyrgyzstan) Razhabali Shaydullaev	def.	(Japan) Koji Takeda	Submission (rear-naked choke)	1	4:42	
Intermission
Lightweight 71 kg	(United States) Spike Carlyle	def.	(South Korea) Kim Kyung-pyo	Technical Submission (rear-naked choke)	3	1:11	
Featherweight 66 kg	(Kazakhstan) Karshyga Dautbek	def.	(Japan) Tetsuya Seki	KO (punch to the body)	1	3:11	
Lightweight 71 kg	(Japan) BeyNoah	def.	(United States) Johnny Case	Decision (unanimous)	3	5:00	Case missed weight (71.9 kg).
Catchweight 61 kg	(Japan) Genji Umeno	def.	(Japan) Uoi Fullswing	Decision (unanimous)	3	3:00	Kickboxing rules (Elbows allowed).
Lightweight 71 kg	(Japan) Sho Patrick Usami	def.	(Japan) Kazuki Tokudome	KO (punches)	1	2:29	

== Super Rizin 3 ==
Super Rizin 3
- Promotion: Rizin Fighting Federation
- Date: July 28, 2024
- Venue: Saitama Super Arena
- City: Saitama, Japan

Super Rizin 3 was a Combat sport event held by Rizin Fighting Federation on July 28, 2024, at the Saitama Super Arena in Saitama, Japan.

=== Background ===
The event was headlined by a featherweight grudge match between Mikuru Asakura and Ren Hiramoto. As an added bet, the loser of the bout was to retired from mixed martial arts.

Internationally, Super Rizin 3 was the first event in four years to feature English commentary in-person, and marked the promotional debut of Michael Schiavello (who previously did commentary for Rizin predecessor Dream).

=== Results ===
Super Rizin 3
Weight Class				Method	Round	T.Time	Notes
Featherweight 66 kg	(Japan) Ren Hiramoto	def.	(Japan) Mikuru Asakura	KO (punches)	1	2:18	
Catchweight 68 kg	(Philippines) Manny Pacquiao	vs.	(Japan) Rukiya Anpo	Draw (time limit)	3	3:00	Rizin Special standing bout rules.
Featherweight 66 kg	(Japan) Yuta Kubo	def.	(Japan) Yutaka Saito	TKO (front kick to the body)	2	4:19	
Flyweight 57 kg	(Japan) Hiromasa Ougikubo	def.	(Japan) Makoto Takahashi	Decision (unanimous)	3	5:00	
Intermission
Catchweight 59 kg	(Japan) Hideo Tokoro	def.	(Japan) Hiroya Kondo	TKO (punch and elbows)	1	3:20	
Bantamweight 61 kg	(Japan) Ryusei Ashizawa	def.	(Japan) Kouzi	Decision (unanimous)	3	5:00	
Catchweight 57.2 kg	(United States) John Dodson	def.	(Japan) Takaki Soya	Decision (unanimous)	5	2:00	Bare Knuckle rules.
W.Super Atomweight 49 kg	(Japan) Rena Kubota	def.	(Japan) Kate Oyama	TKO (punches)	2	4:18	
Featherweight 66 kg	(Japan) YA-MAN	def.	(Japan) Hiroaki Suzuki	KO (punches)	1	3:28	
W.Catchweight 57.2 kg	(Australia) Tai Emery	def.	(United States) Charisa Sigala	TKO (punch)	1	0:37	Bare Knuckle rules.
Featherweight 66 kg	(Japan) Kazumasa Majima	def.	(Japan) Suguru Nii	Submission (rear-naked choke)	2	3:11	

== Rizin 48 ==
Rizin 48
- Promotion: Rizin Fighting Federation
- Date: September 29, 2024
- Venue: Saitama Super Arena
- City: Saitama, Japan

Rizin 48 was a Combat sport event held by Rizin Fighting Federation on September 29, 2024, at the Saitama Super Arena in Saitama, Japan.

=== Background ===
A Rizin Lightweight Championship bout between current champion Roberto de Souza and Luiz Gustavo headlined the event. While a Rizin Bantamweight Championship bout for the vacant title between Naoki Inoue and former ONE Bantamweight Champion Kim Soo-chul took place at co-main event.

=== Results ===
Rizin 48
Weight Class				Method	Round	T.Time	Notes
Lightweight 70 kg	(Brazil) Roberto de Souza (c)	def.	(Brazil) Luiz Gustavo	TKO (punches)	1	0:21	For the Rizin Lightweight Championship.
Bantamweight 61 kg	(Japan) Naoki Inoue	def.	(South Korea) Kim Soo-chul	TKO (punches)	1	3:55	For the vacant Rizin Bantamweight Championship.
Bantamweight 61 kg	(Japan) Yuki Motoya	def.	(Japan) Shinobu Ota	Submission (rear-naked choke)	3	4:09	
Featherweight 66 kg	(Kyrgyzstan) Razhabali Shaydullaev	def.	(United States) Juan Archuleta	Submission (armbar)	1	3:12	
Intermission
Super Atomweight 49 kg	(Japan) Seika Izawa	def.	(Japan) Kanna Asakura	Decision (unanimous)	3	5:00	Non-title bout.
Bantamweight 61 kg	(Japan) Shoko Sato	def.	(Japan) Juntaro Ushiku	Decision (unanimous)	3	5:00	
Lightweight 70 kg	(Japan) Yusuke Yachi	def.	(Japan) Sho Patrick Usami	Decision (unanimous)	3	5:00	
Featherweight 66 kg	(Japan) Ryo Takagi	def.	(Japan) Kyohei Hagiwara	Submission (rear-naked choke)	1	2:39	
Bantamweight 61 kg	(Japan) Kyouma Akimoto	def.	(Japan) Yuto Hokamura	TKO (punches and knees)	1	3:16	
Flyweight 57 kg	(South Africa) Nkazimulo Zulu	def.	(Japan) Jo Arai	TKO (spinning wheel kick and punches)	1	4:12	
Featherweight 66 kg	(Kazakhstan) Karshyga Dautbek	def.	(Japan) Takeaki Kinoshita	KO (punch)	1	1:48	

== Rizin Landmark 10 ==
Rizin Landmark 10
- Promotion: Rizin Fighting Federation
- Date: November 17, 2024
- Venue: Nagoya International Exhibition Hall
- City: Nagoya, Japan

Rizin Landmark 10 was a Combat sport event held by Rizin Fighting Federation on November 17, 2024, at Nagoya International Exhibition Hall in Nagoya, Japan.

=== Background ===
A featherweight bout between former Rizin Featherweight Champion Vugar Karamov and Kazumasa Majima headlined the event.

=== Results ===
Rizin Landmark 10
Weight Class				Method	Round	T.Time	Notes
Featherweight 66 kg	(Azerbaijan) Vugar Karamov	def.	(Japan) Kazumasa Majima	TKO (punches and elbows)	1	0:28	
Super Atomweight 49 kg	(Japan) Ayaka Hamasaki	def.	(South Korea) Shim Yu-ri	Submission (kimura)	2	1:15	
Bantamweight 61 kg	(Japan) Ryusei Ashizawa	def.	(Japan) Shoji Maruyama	KO (knee to the body)	2	1:05	
Heavyweight 120 kg	(Japan) Tsuyoshi Sudario	def.	(Japan) Hisaki Kato	TKO (doctor stoppage)	3	1:11	
Featherweight 66 kg	(Japan) Kyoma Akimoto	def.	(Japan) Hiroaki Suzuki	Decision (unanimous)	3	5:00	
Intermission
Lightweight 70 kg	(South Korea) Kim Kyung-pyo	def.	(Japan) Daigo Kuramoto	TKO (elbows and punches)	1	3:59	
Flyweight 57 kg	(Japan) Yuki Ito	def.	(South Korea) Lee Jung-hyun	TKO (elbows)	3	2:59	
Flyweight 57 kg	(Japan) Hiroya Kondo	def.	(Japan) Yuya Shibata	Decision (unanimous)	3	5:00	
Flyweight 57 kg	(Canada) Tony Laramie	def.	(Japan) Yutaro Muramoto	Decision (unanimous)	3	5:00	
Bantamweight 61 kg	(Azerbaijan) Magerram Gasanzade	def.	(Japan) Rikuto Shirakawa	Decision (unanimous)	3	5:00	
Bantamweight 61 kg	(Brazil) Alan Yamaniha	def.	(Japan) Seigo Yamamoto	Submission (rear-naked choke)	2	3:07	
Flyweight 57 kg	(Russia) Alibek Gadzhammatov	def.	(Japan) Daichi Kitakata	TKO (knees and punches)	1	3:20	
Rizin MMA Special Rules (5min / 2R)
Bantamweight 61 kg	(Japan) Taito Kubota	def.	(Japan) Junya Hibino	TKO (punches)	2	0:36	
Heavyweight 120 kg	(Japan) Masashi Inada	vs.	(Japan) Katsuyoshi Sasaki	Submission (straight armbar)	1	1:38	
Featherweight 66 kg	(Japan) Sho Hiramatsu	def.	(Japan) Daisuke Tatsumi	TKO (doctor stoppage)	2	2:55	
Kickboxing bout
Catchweight 55 kg	(Japan) JIN	def.	(Japan) Toshizou	Decision (unanimous)	3	3:00	

== Rizin 49 ==
Rizin 49: Decade
- Promotion: Rizin Fighting Federation
- Date: December 31, 2024
- Venue: Saitama Super Arena
- City: Saitama, Japan

Rizin 49: Decade was a Combat sport event held by Rizin Fighting Federation on December 31, 2024, at the Saitama Super Arena in Saitama, Japan.

=== Background ===
A Rizin Featherweight Championship rematch between current champion Chihiro Suzuki and former champion (also former KSW Featherweight Champion) Kleber Koike Erbst headlined the event. The pairing previously met at Rizin 43 in June 2023, Koike Erbst was stripped of the title when he missed weight for his attempted title defense. Although Koike Erbst won by armbar in round one, but result was immediately overturned into a no contest due to the weight miss.

A Rizin Flyweight Championship bout between current champion Kyoji Horiguchi (also former Bellator and two-time Rizin Bantamweight Champion) and Nkazimulo Zulu took place at the co-main event. While, a Rizin Lightweight Championship bout between current champion Roberto de Souza and former featherweight champion Vugar Karamov completed the triad of title fights.

=== Results ===
Rizin 49
Weight Class				Method	Round	T.Time	Notes
Featherweight 66 kg	(Brazil) Kleber Koike Erbst	def.	(Japan) Chihiro Suzuki (c)	Decision (unanimous)	3	5:00	For the Rizin Featherweight Championship.
Flyweight 57 kg	(Japan) Kyoji Horiguchi (c)	def.	(South Africa) Nkazimulo Zulu	Decision (unanimous)	3	5:00	For the Rizin Flyweight Championship.
Lightweight 70 kg	(Brazil) Roberto de Souza (c)	def.	(Azerbaijan) Vugar Karamov	Submission (triangle choke)	1	4:45	For the Rizin Lightweight Championship.
Super Atomweight 49 kg	(Japan) Seika Izawa	def.	(Argentina) Lucia Apdelgarim	Submission (triangle armbar)	1	2:21	Non-title bout.
Bantamweight 61 kg	(Japan) Yuki Motoya	def.	(Japan) Kyoma Akimoto	Decision (unanimous)	3	5:00	
Intermission
Featherweight 66 kg	(Kyrgyzstan) Razhabali Shaydullaev	def.	(Japan) Yuta Kubo	TKO (punches)	2	2:30	
Featherweight 66 kg	(Kazakhstan) Karshyga Dautbek	def.	(Japan) YA-MAN	Decision (unanimous)	3	5:00	
Bantamweight 61 kg	(Japan) Ryuya Fukuda	def.	(Japan) Ryusei Ashizawa	KO (punches)	1	0:54	
Heavyweight 120 kg	(Japan) Mikio Ueda	def.	(South Korea) Kim Tae-in	KO (knee)	2	2:31	
Catchweight 59 kg	(United States) Jose Torres	def.	(Japan) Makoto Takahashi	Decision (split)	3	5:00	
Lightweight 71 kg	(Japan) Taisei Sakuraba	def.	(Japan) Yusuke Yachi	TKO (punches)	1	0:26	
Featherweight 66 kg	(Japan) Koji Takeda	def.	(Japan) Suguru Nii	Technical Decision (unanimous)	3	4:09	Accidental illegal knees rendered Takeda unable to continue.
Heavyweight 120 kg	(Japan) King Edokpolo	def.	(Japan) Takakenshin	KO (knee and punches)	1	3:22	
Bantamweight 61 kg	(Japan) Genji Umeno	def.	(Japan) Taiga Kawabe	Decision (unanimous)	3	5:00	
Opening Ceremony: Rizin Koshien Final
Bantamweight 61 kg	(Japan) Sanou Yokouchi	def.	(Japan) Kenshin Saito	Submission (rear-naked choke)	1	3:03	
Rizin Bangaichi
Catchweight 100 kg	(Japan) Rukiya Anpo	def.	(Iran) Sina Karimian	Decision (unanimous)	6	2:00	Rizin Special Standing bout.
Welterweight 77 kg	(Japan) Sho Patrick Usami	def.	(Japan) Issa Hosokawa	KO (punches to the body)	2	2:59	Kickboxing Open-Finger Gloves.
Catchweight 58 kg	(Japan) Tatsuki Shinotsuka	def.	(Japan) Aoi Noda	TKO (punch)	1	2:04	Kickboxing Open-Finger Gloves.
Catchweight 63 kg	(Japan) Daichi Tomizawa	def.	(Japan) Kota Miura	KO (knee)	1	1:53	Rizin MMA Special Rules (5min / 2R).
Featherweight 66 kg	(Japan) Taio Asahisa	def.	(Japan) Yura	Decision (unanimous)	3	3:00	Kickboxing bout.
Featherweight 66 kg	(Japan) Hyuma Yasui	def.	(Japan) Hiroaki Suzuki	Decision (unanimous)	3	5:00	
Featherweight 66 kg	(Japan) Hiroto Gomyo	def.	(Japan) Koki Akada	Decision (split)	3	5:00	

== See also ==
- List of current Rizin FF fighters
- 2024 in UFC
- 2024 in Bellator MMA
- 2024 in ONE Championship
- 2024 in Professional Fighters League
- 2024 in Absolute Championship Akhmat
- 2024 in Konfrontacja Sztuk Walki
- 2024 in Oktagon MMA
- 2024 in Legacy Fighting Alliance
- 2024 in LUX Fight League
- 2024 in Brave Combat Federation
- 2024 in Road FC
