= Makoto Takahashi (fighter) =

Japanese mixed martial artist (born 2000)

- Born: July 5, 2000 (age 26); Sendai, Miyagi, Japan
- Native name: 髙橋 誠
- Other names: Makoto Shinryu
- Height: 1.65 m (5 ft 5 in)
- Weight: 57 kg (126 lb)
- Division: Flyweight
- Style: Wrestling
- Team: Paraestra Matsudo
- Years active: 2016–present

Mixed martial arts record
- Total: 31
- Wins: 23
- By submission: 7
- By decision: 16
- Losses: 6
- By submission: 1
- By decision: 5
- Draws: 1
- No contests: 1

Other information
- Mixed martial arts record from Sherdog

Makoto Takahashi (髙橋 誠, Takahashi Makoto; born July 5, 2000), also known as Makoto Shinryu (神龍 誠, Shinryū Makoto), is a Japanese professional mixed martial artist who competes in the flyweight division of Rizin, where he is the former Rizin Flyweight Champion. A professional since 2016, he has also competed in Bellator MMA, Pancrase, Deep, where he is a former Deep Flyweight Champion, and the Cage Fury Fighting Championships (CFFC), where he is a former Cage Fury Flyweight Champion.

== Mixed martial arts career ==
=== Deep ===
After graduating, Takahashi turned professional and made his mixed martial arts debut at Pancrase 277 on April 24, 2016, winning by unanimous decision. He then rose to prominence with a seven-bout undefeated streak.

On April 28, 2018, Takahashi faced defending champion Ryuko Wada in a DEEP flyweight title match at DEEP 83 IMPACT. He lost his first bout by unanimous decision.

On June 29, 2019, Takahashi faced Yuya Shibata for the DEEP interim flyweight championship match. He won the bout by unanimous decision to win the interim title and become the youngest champion in DEEP history at the age of 18. (Note: In February 2020, Tatsumitsu Wada vacated the Deep flyweight title on Feb 2020. Takahashi was promoted to full champion status on March 1, 2020.)

=== Deep and Rizin ===
Making his Bellator and Rizin debut, Takahashi faced Yusaku Nakamura December 29, 2019, at Bellator 237. He won the bout by unanimous decision.

Takahashi fought Seiichiro Ito on August 10, 2020, at Rizin 23, which was his first appearance in the RIZIN main tournament. After a fierce match, he won the bout by guillotine choke in the 2nd round.

Takahashi faced interim champion Yamato Fujita on May 8, 2022, at DEEP 107 IMPACT's DEEP flyweight championship unification match. He won the bout with a ninja choke in the third round, successfully defending the title for the first time and unifying the title.

Takahashi faced Hideo Tokoro at Rizin 37 - Saitama on July 31, 2022. He won the fight by unanimous decision.

Takahashi faced Diego Paiva for the Cage Fury Flyweight Championship on November 10, 2022, at CFFC 114. He won the bout with a ninja choke in the 4th round, and succeeded in winning the CFFC championship. The finish of this fight was named Submission of the Year among all fights broadcast on UFC Fight Pass at the 2022 UFC Fight Pass Awards.

Takahashi faced Daichi Kitakata on April 1, 2023, at Rizin 41 – Osaka. He won the bout in the second round by arm-triangle choke.

Takahashi competed for the inaugural Bellator Flyweight World Championship at Bellator MMA x Rizin 2 on July 30, 2023, in Saitama, Japan where he faced Kyoji Horiguchi. The bout was declared a no contest after Horiguchi accidentally poked Takahashi in the eye which prevented him from continuing.

Takahashi rematched against Horiguchi, at Rizin 45, on December 31, 2023, this time for the inaugural Rizin Flyweight Championship. He lost the bout via submission in the second round.

Takahashi faced Lee Jung-hyun at Rizin 46 on April 29, 2024, submitting him via arm-triangle choke at the end of the first round.

Takahashi faced Hiromasa Ougikubo on July 28, 2024 at Super Rizin 3, and lost the bout via unanimous decision.

Takahashi faced Kenta on November 4, 2024, at DEEP 122 Impact. He won the bout by split decision.

Takahashi faced Jose Torres on December 31, 2024, at Rizin 49. He lost the bout by split decision.

Takahashi faced Yuki Ito on May 4, 2025, at Rizin: Otoko Matsuri. He won the bout by unanimous decision.

Takahashi faced Erson Yamamoto in the quarterfinals of the 2025 Rizin Flyweight Grand Prix, which were held at Super Rizin 4 on July 27, 2025. He won the fight by submission in the first round.

Takahashi faced Yuki Motoya in the tournament semifinals, held at Rizin 51 on September 28, 2025. He lost the fight by unanimous decision.

Takahashi faced Hiroya Kondo at Rizin: Shiwasu no Cho Tsuwamono Matsuri on December 31, 2025. He won the bout by unanimous decision.

==== Rizin Flyweight Champion ====
Takahashi faced Hiromasa Ougikubo for the Rizin Flyweight Championship on June 6, 2026, at Rizin Landmark 14. He won the title by unanimous decision.

== Championships and accomplishments ==
- Cage Fury Fighting Championships
  - Cage Fury Flyweight Championship (One time)
- DEEP
  - DEEP Flyweight Championship (One time)
- Rizin Fighting Federation
  - Rizin Flyweight Championship (One time, current)
- Cageside Press
  - 2022 Asian Prospect of the Year

== Mixed martial arts record ==
Professional record breakdown
31 matches	23 wins	6 losses
By submission	7	1
By decision	16	5
Draws	1	
No contests	1	

Res.	Record	Opponent	Method	Event	Date	Round	Time	Location	Notes
Loss	23–6–1 (1)	Tony Laramie	Decision (split)	Rizin 55	November 8, 2026	3	5:00	Funabashi, Japan	Lost the Rizin Flyweight Championship.
Win	23–5–1 (1)	Hiromasa Ougikubo	Decision (unanimous)	Rizin Landmark 14	June 6, 2026	3	5:00	Sendai, Japan	Won the Rizin Flyweight Championship.
Win	22–5–1 (1)	Nkazimulo Zulu	Submission (kimura)	Rizin Landmark 13	April 12, 2026	1	2:52	Fukuoka, Japan	
Win	21–5–1 (1)	Hiroya Kondo	Decision (unanimous)	Rizin: Shiwasu no Cho Tsuwamono Matsuri	December 31, 2025	3	5:00	Saitama, Japan	
Loss	20–5–1 (1)	Yuki Motoya	Decision (unanimous)	Rizin 51	September 28, 2025	3	5:00	Nagoya, Japan	2025 Rizin Flyweight Grand Prix Semifinal.
Win	20–4–1 (1)	Erson Yamamoto	Submission (guillotine choke)	Super Rizin 4	July 27, 2025	1	2:55	Saitama, Japan	2025 Rizin Flyweight Grand Prix Quarterfinal.
Win	19–4–1 (1)	Yuki Ito	Decision (unanimous)	Rizin: Otoko Matsuri	May 4, 2025	3	5:00	Tokyo, Japan	Catchweight (130 lb) bout.
Loss	18–4–1 (1)	Jose Torres	Decision (split)	Rizin 49	December 31, 2024	3	5:00	Saitama, Japan	Catchweight (130 lb) bout.
Win	18–3–1 (1)	Kenta Hayashi	Decision (split)	DEEP 122 Impact	November 4, 2024	3	5:00	Tokyo, Japan	
Loss	17–3–1 (1)	Hiromasa Ougikubo	Decision (unanimous)	Super Rizin 3	July 28, 2024	3	5:00	Saitama, Japan	
Win	17–2–1 (1)	Lee Jung-hyun	Submission (arm-triangle choke)	Rizin 46	April 29, 2024	1	4:29	Tokyo, Japan	
Loss	16–2–1 (1)	Kyoji Horiguchi	Submission (rear-naked choke)	Rizin 45	December 31, 2023	2	3:44	Saitama, Japan	For the inaugural Rizin Flyweight Championship.
NC	16–1–1 (1)	Kyoji Horiguchi	NC (accidental eye poke)	Bellator MMA x Rizin 2	July 30, 2023	1	0:25	Saitama, Japan	For the inaugural Bellator Flyweight World Championship. Accidental eye poke rendered Takahashi unable to continue.
Win	16–1–1	Daichi Kitakata	Technical Submission (arm-triangle choke)	Rizin 41	April 1, 2023	2	1:17	Osaka, Japan	
Win	15–1–1	Diego Paiva	Submission (guillotine choke)	Cage Fury FC 14	November 10, 2022	4	0:28	Tampa, Florida, United States	Won the vacant Cage Fury FC Flyweight Championship.
Win	14–1–1	Hideo Tokoro	Decision (unanimous)	Rizin 37	July 31, 2022	3	5:00	Saitama, Japan	
Win	13–1–1	Yamato Fujita	Submission (ninja choke)	DEEP 107 Impact	May 8, 2022	3	0:53	Tokyo, Japan	Defended and unified the Deep Flyweight Championship. Later vacated the title.
Win	12–1–1	Ryuya Fukuda	Decision (unanimous)	DEEP 104 Impact	October 23, 2021	3	5:00	Tokyo, Japan	Non-title bout.
Win	11–1–1	Seiichiro Ito	Submission (flying guillotine choke)	Rizin 23	August 10, 2020	2	4:30	Yokohama, Japan	Catchweight (130 lb) bout.
Win	10–1–1	Yusaku Nakamura	Decision (unanimous)	Bellator 237	December 29, 2019	3	5:00	Saitama, Japan	
Win	9–1–1	Yuya Shibata	Decision (unanimous)	DEEP 90 Impact	June 29, 2019	3	5:00	Tokyo, Japan	Won the interim Deep Flyweight Championship. Later promoted to undisputed champion.
Win	8–1–1	Chikara Shimabukuro	Decision (unanimous)	DEEP 88 Impact	March 9, 2019	2	5:00	Tokyo, Japan	
Win	7–1–1	Haruki Nakayama	Decision (unanimous)	DEEP 86 Impact	October 27, 2018	2	5:00	Tokyo, Japan	
Loss	6–1–1	Tatsumitsu Wada	Decision (unanimous)	DEEP 83 Impact	April 28, 2018	3	5:00	Tokyo, Japan	For the Deep Flyweight Championship.
Win	6–0–1	Kota Ishibashi	Decision (split)	DEEP 82 Impact	February 24, 2018	3	5:00	Tokyo, Japan	
Win	5–0–1	Hiroki Yamashita	Decision (unanimous)	Pancrase vs. DEEP: Osaka	December 24, 2017	3	5:00	Amagasaki, Japan	
Win	4–0–1	Yuto Nakamori	Decision (majority)	DEEP 79 Impact	September 16, 2017	2	5:00	Tokyo, Japan	
Draw	3–0–1	Yasutaka Ishigami	Draw (majority)	DEEP Cage Impact 2017	May 13, 2017	2	5:00	Tokyo, Japan	
Win	3–0	Takuya Maruoka	Decision (unanimous)	DEEP Cage Impact 2016: DEEP vs. WSOF-GC	December 17, 2016	2	5:00	Tokyo, Japan	
Win	2–0	Hidemasa Soga	Decision (unanimous)	DEEP 77 Impact	August 27, 2016	2	5:00	Tokyo, Japan	Flyweight debut.
Win	1–0	Shinichi Maeno	Decision (unanimous)	Pancrase 277	April 24, 2016	3	5:00	Tokyo, Japan	Bantamweight debut.

== See also ==
- List of male mixed martial artists
