= List of current Rizin Fighting Federation fighters =

Here is a list of current fighters in the Rizin Fighting Federation.

== Heavyweight (120 kg) ==
ISO	Name	Nickname	Result / next fight / status	MMA record	Rizin record	Last Rizin fight
(Japan) (Philippines)	Tsuyoshi Sudario		Loss - Rizin: Otoko Matsuri (Tokyo) - Jose Augusto	9–4	9–4	May 2025
(Japan)	Shoma Shibisai		Loss - Rizin: Otoko Matsuri (Tokyo) - Mikio Ueda	10–4 (1)	5–3	May 2025
(Japan)	Mikio Ueda		Win - Rizin: Otoko Matsuri (Tokyo) - Shoma Shibisai	5–2	4–2	May 2025
(Japan) (Philippines)	Takakenshin		Loss - Rizin 49 (Saitama) - King Edokpolo	1–4	1–4	Dec 2024
(Japan)	King Edokpolo		Win - Rizin 50 (Takamatsu) - Ryo Sakai	2–0	2–0	Mar 2025
(Japan)	Hidetaka Arato	Kaiju Kiler	Win - Grachan 72 (Toyonaka) - Shinnosuke Oba	11–1	1–0	Oct 2023

== Welterweight (77 kg) ==
ISO	Name	Nickname	Result / next fight / status	MMA record	Rizin record	Last Rizin fight
(Japan)	Daichi Abe		Loss - Deep 120 Impact (Tokyo) - Ibuki Shimada	13–8	4–2	Feb 2024
(Brazil) (Japan)	Igor Tanabe Guimarães	Fatninja	(Mar 23, 2024) - Missed weight - Out of Rizin Landmark 9 (Kobe) - Kiichi Kunimoto	5–0	3–0	Dec 2023
(Japan)	Keita Nakamura	K-Taro	Loss - Rizin Landmark 9 (Kobe) - Roberto Satoshi Souza	36–12–2 (1)	2–1	Mar 2024

== Lightweight (71 kg) ==
ISO	Name	Nickname	Result / next fight / status	MMA record	Rizin record	Last Rizin fight
(Brazil) (Japan)	Roberto Satoshi Souza (C)		Rizin World Series in Korea (Incheon) - Ki Won-bin (*Non-Title fight)	18–3	11–3	Dec 2024
(Japan)	Yusuke Yachi		Loss - Rizin 49 (Saitama) - Taisei Sakuraba	27–15	11–8	Dec 2024
(Brazil)	Luiz Gustavo	Killer	Loss - Rizin 50 (Takamatsu) - Shunta Nomura	14–4	6–4	Mar 2025
(United States)	Johnny Case	Hollywood	Rizin World Series in Korea (Incheon) - Juri Ohara	28–10–1	4–4	Jun 2024
(Japan)	Yoshinori Horie	Rising Star	Rizin Landmark 11 (Sapporo) - Yamato Nishikawa	13–5	4–2	Feb 2024
(United States)	BeyNoah	Black Panther	Win - Rizin 47 (Tokyo) - Johnny Case	3–3	3–3	Jun 2024
(Japan) (Canada)	Sho Patrick Usami	Savage	Rizin World Series in Korea (Incheon) - Kim Si-won	7–4	3–2	Sep 2024
(United States)	Spike Carlyle	The Alpha Ginger	Loss - Rizin 50 (Takamatsu) - Takeshi Izumi	15–7	2–3	Mar 2025
(Japan)	Juri Ohara	Iron Spider	Rizin World Series in Korea (Incheon) - Johnny Case	36–21–2 (1)	3–1	Sep 2022
(South Korea)	Kim Kyung-pyo	Red Horse	Win - Rizin Landmark 10 (Nagoya) - Daigo Kuramoto	14–5	3–1	Nov 2024
(Japan)	Akira Okada	AKIRA	Loss - Pancrase 341 (Tokyo) - Tatsuya Saika (*Title fight)	19–11–4	2–2	Jul 2023
(Japan)	Yusaku Inoue		Loss - Rizin 46 (Tokyo) - BeyNoah	11–5–1	1–1	Apr 2024
(Japan)	Takeshi Izumi		Win - Rizin 50 (Takamatsu) - Spike Carlyle	6–3	1–1	Mar 2025
(Japan)	Taisei Sakuraba		Loss - Rizin: Otoko Matsuri (Tokyo) - Daisuke Nakamura	1–1	1–1	May 2025
(Japan)	Shunta Nomura		Win - Rizin 50 (Takamatsu) - Luiz Gustavo	9–2	1–0	Mar 2025

== Featherweight (66 kg) ==
ISO	Name	Nickname	Result / next fight / status	MMA record	Rizin record	Last Rizin fight
(Kyrgyzstan)	Razhabali Shaydullaev (C)		Win - Rizin: Otoko Matsuri (Tokyo) - Kleber Koike Erbst	20-0	8-0	May 2025
(Japan)	Mikuru Asakura		Win - Rizin: Otoko Matsuri (Tokyo) - Chihiro Suzuki	18–5 (1)	12–4	May 2025
(Japan)	Kyohei Hagiwara		Win - Rizin: Otoko Matsuri (Tokyo) - Taisei Nishitani	9–10	8–8	May 2025
(Japan)	Koji Takeda		Rizin World Series in Korea (Incheon) - Ji Hyuk-min	17–7	7–7	Dec 2024
(Brazil) (Japan)	Kleber Koike Erbst		Loss - Rizin: Otoko Matsuri (Tokyo) - Razhabali Shaydullaev	34–8–1 (1)	9–3 (1)	May 2025
(Japan)	Chihiro Suzuki		Loss - Rizin: Otoko Matsuri (Tokyo) - Mikuru Asakura	13–6 (1)	8–4 (1)	May 2025
(Japan)	Hiroaki Suzuki	Kaibutsu-kun	Loss - Rizin 49 (Saitama) - Hyuma Yasui	4–6	4–6	Dec 2024
(Azerbaijan)	Vugar Karamov	Vugi	Rizin Landmark 11 (Sapporo) - Shuya Kimura	20–6	6–3	Dec 2024
(Japan)	Yutaka Saito		Loss - Super Rizin 3 (Saitama) - Yuta Kubo	21–9–2	4–5	Jul 2024
(Japan)	Kazumasa Majima		Loss - Rizin Landmark 10 (Nagoya) - Vugar Karamov	17–6	3–5	Nov 2024
(Japan)	Yuta Kubo	The Smiling Sniper	Loss - Rizin 49 (Saitama) - Razhabali Shaydullaev	5–2	5–2	Dec 2024
(Japan)	Ren Hiramoto		Win - Super Rizin 3 (Saitama) - Mikuru Asakura	4–3	4–3	Jul 2024
(Japan)	Takahiro Ashida		Loss - Deep Impact 124 (Tokyo) - Arata Mizuno	26–17–2	3–4	Feb 2024
(Japan)	Sora Yamamoto		Loss - Rizin 46 (Tokyo) - Ilkhom Nazimov	16–10–2	3–4	Apr 2024
(Japan)	Masanori Kanehara		Loss - Rizin 46 (Tokyo) - Chihiro Suzuki	31–15–5	4–2	Apr 2024
(United States)	Juan Archuleta	The Spaniard	Borroka 3 (Laughlin, Nevada) - Dennis Linton (*May. 31)	29–7	3–3	Sep 2024
(Japan)	Tetsuya Seki	Iron Arrow	Loss - Rizin 47 (Tokyo) - Karshyga Dautbek	16–10–1	3–3	Jun 2024
(Japan)	Suguru Nii	Kombaouji	Loss - Rizin 49 (Saitama) - Koji Takeda	18–11	2–4	Dec 2024
(Kazakhstan)	Karshyga Dautbek		Win - Rizin 50 (Takamatsu) - Chihiro Suzuki	18–3	4–1	Mar 2025
(Japan)	Yoshiki Nakahara		Rizin World Series in Korea (Incheon) - Song Young-jae	18–7	3–2	Apr 2024
(Japan)	Satoshi Yamasu	Dominator	Loss - Rizin 45 (Saitama) - Suguru Nii	13–8	2–3	Dec 2023
(Japan)	Kyoma Akimoto		Win - Rizin: Otoko Matsuri (Tokyo) - Ryo Takagi	8–1	3–1	May 2025
(Japan)	Masakazu Imanari	Ashikan Judan	Win - Rizin Landmark 8 (Saga) - Shohei Nose	40–22–2	2–2	Feb 2024
(Japan)	Ryo Takagi		Loss - Rizin: Otoko Matsuri (Tokyo) - Kyoma Akimoto	8–3	2–2	May 2025
(Japan)	YA-MAN	King of Street Fight	Loss - Rizin 49 (Saitama) - Karshyga Dautbek	2–2	2–2	Dec 2024
(Japan)	Kota Miura		Rizin World Series in Korea (Incheon) - Kwon Yong-cheol	2–2	2–2	Dec 2024
(Russia)	Viktor Kolesnik		Rizin Landmark 11 (Sapporo) - Keisuke Sasu	26–6–1	3–0	Apr 2024
(Japan)	Takeji Yokoyama		Loss - Rizin 50 (Takamatsu) - Shuya Kimura	6–2	1–2	Mar 2025
(Japan)	Taisei Nishitani		Loss - Rizin: Otoko Matsuri (Tokyo) - Kyohei Hagiwara	6–9	0–3	May 2025
(Uzbekistan)	Ilkhom Nazimov		Win - Rizin 46 (Tokyo) - Sora Yamamoto	11–3	2–0	Apr 2024
(Japan)	Shuya Kimura		Rizin Landmark 11 (Sapporo) - Vugar Karamov	5–1	1–1	Mar 2025
(Japan)	Hyuma Yasui		Win - Rizin 49 (Saitama) - Hiroaki Suzuki	4–0	1–0	Dec 2024

== Bantamweight (61 kg) ==
ISO	Name	Nickname	Result / next fight / status	MMA record	Rizin record	Last Rizin fight
(Japan)	Naoki Inoue (C)		Win - Rizin 50 (Takamatsu) - Yuki Motoya	19–4	9–2	Mar 2025
(Japan)	Yuki Motoya		Loss - Rizin 50 (Takamatsu) - Naoki Inoue	37–13 (1)	12–8 (1)	Mar 2025
(Japan)	Shinobu Ota		Loss - Rizin: Otoko Matsuri (Tokyo) - Danny Sabatello	7–5	6–5	May 2025
(Japan)	Kenta Takizawa		Loss - Deep Impact 124 (Tokyo) - Sho Hiramatsu	14–13	3–6	Feb 2024
(Japan)	Yuto Hokamura	Kintaro	Rizin World Series in Korea (Incheon) - Yang Ji-yong	15–14–2	3–6	Sep 2024
(Brazil) (Japan)	Alan Yamaniha	Hiro	Win - Rizin Landmark 10 (Nagoya) - Seigo Yamamoto	22–11–4	5–2	Nov 2024
(Japan)	Kazuma Kuramoto		Win - Rizin 46 (Tokyo) - Yang Ji-yong	11–4	4–3	Apr 2024
(Japan)	Juntaro Ushiku	Fighting Bull	Loss - Deep 125 Impact (Tokyo) - Ryuya Fukuda (*Title fight)	21–11	3–4	Sep 2024
(Japan)	Mamoru Uoi	Fullswing	Win - Rizin 50 (Takamatsu) - Koki Akada	25–15–5	3–4	Mar 2025
(Japan)	Rikuto Shirakawa	Dark	Loss - Rizin Landmark 10 (Nagoya) - Magerram Gasanzade	12–11–1	3–4	Nov 2024
(Japan)	Yushi		Loss - Rizin 45 (Saitama) - Joe Hiramoto	3–2	3–2	Dec 2023
(South Korea)	Kim Soo-chul		Rizin World Series in Korea (Incheon) - Yuto Hokamura	23–8–1 (1)	3–1	Sep 2024
(Japan)	Ryusei Ashizawa		Loss - Rizin 49 (Saitama) - Ryuya Fukuda	2–2	2–2	Dec 2024
(Japan)	Ryuya Fukuda		Win - Deep 125 Impact (Tokyo) - Juntaro Ushiku (*Title fight)	25–8–1	3–0	Dec 2024
(Japan)	Shoko Sato	Masamitsu	Rizin World Series in Korea (Incheon) - Kim Soo-chul	36–16–2 (1)	2–1	Sep 2024
(South Korea)	Yang Ji-yong		Rizin World Series in Korea (Incheon) - Shoko Sato	9–3	2–1	Apr 2024
(Japan)	Taichi Nakajima		Rizin Landmark 11 (Sapporo) - Kosuke Terashima	17–13–1	1–2	Apr 2024
(Japan)	Junya Hibino	Ebichu	Loss - Deep Impact 124 (Tokyo) - Shunsuke Miyabi	7–6	1–2	Nov 2024
(Japan)	Joji Goto		Rizin Landmark 11 (Sapporo) - Jinnosuke Kashimura	15–7	2–0	Jun 2023
(Japan)	Kouzi		Loss - Super Rizin 3 (Saitama) - Ryusei Ashizawa	1–1	1–1	Jul 2024
(Japan)	Ryo Okada		Loss - Rizin 44 (Saitama) - Taichi Nakajima	17–6–3	0–2	Sep 2023
(Azerbaijan)	Magerram Gasanzade		Rizin Landmark 11 (Sapporo) - Tatsuya Ando	11–1	1–0	Nov 2024
(Japan)	Shohei Nose		Win - Shooto Torao 35 (Fukuoka) - Kenji Kato	14–6–2	1–0	Feb 2024

== Flyweight (57 kg) ==
ISO	Name	Nickname	Result / next fight / status	MMA record	Rizin record	Last Rizin fight
(Japan)	Hiromasa Ougikubo		Win - Super Rizin 3 (Saitama) - Makoto Takahashi	27–8–2	9–5	Jul 2024
(Japan)	Erson Yamamoto	Badman	Win - Rizin: Otoko Matsuri (Tokyo) - Daichi Tomizawa	5–7	4–7	May 2025
(Japan)	Yuki Ito		Loss - Rizin: Otoko Matsuri (Tokyo) - Makoto Takahashi	18–6	8–2	May 2025
(Japan)	Hideo Tokoro		Win - Super Rizin 3 (Saitama) - Hiroya Kondo	36–33–2	4–5	Jul 2024
(Japan)	Makoto Takahashi	Shinryu	Win - Rizin: Otoko Matsuri (Tokyo) - Yuki Ito	19–4–1 (1)	5–3 (1)	May 2025
(Japan)	Yusaku Nakamura		Win - Rizin Landmark 9 (Kobe) - Arman Ashimov	19–10–1	4–4	Mar 2024
(Japan)	Takaki Soya		Win - Rizin: Otoko Matsuri (Tokyo) - John Dodson	13–6–1	4–2	May 2025
(Japan)	Hiroya Kondo		Win - Rizin: Otoko Matsuri (Tokyo) - Tatsuki Shinotsuka	11–13–1	3–3	May 2025
(Japan)	Yutaro Muramoto	Baaan!	Win - Deep 125 Impact (Tokyo) - Sho Sekihara	13–9–2	2–4	Nov 2024
(United States)	John Dodson		Loss - Rizin: Otoko Matsuri (Tokyo) - Takaki Soya	24–15	2–2	May 2025
(Japan)	Daichi Kitakata		Loss - Rizin Landmark 10 (Nagoya) - Alibek Gadzhammatov	20–13–1 (2)	1–3	Nov 2024
(Thailand)	Topnoi Kiwram	Lucky Left	Loss - Rizin Landmark 6 (Nagoya) - Yuki Ito	9–6	1–3	Oct 2023
(Azerbaijan)	Mehman Mamedov		Win - Rizin Landmark 7 (Baku) - Ferit Göktepe	7–6 (1)	2–1	Nov 2023
(Japan)	Joe Hiramoto		Win - Rizin: Otoko Matsuri (Tokyo) - Toki Tamaru	2–1	2–0	May 2025
(Brazil)	Rogério Bontorin		Win - Rizin Landmark 6 (Nagoya) - Yutaro Muramoto	17–5 (2)	1–1	Oct 2023
(South Africa)	Nkazimulo Zulu		Loss - Rizin 49 (Saitama) - Kyoji Horiguchi	16–7–1	1–1	Dec 2024
(Canada)	Tony Laramie		Loss - Rizin 50 (Takamatsu) - Shuya Kimura	10–3	1–1	Mar 2025
(Japan)	Yuya Shibata	Monkey	Loss - Rizin Landmark 10 (Nagoya) - Hiroya Kondo	19–8	1–1	Nov 2024
(Japan)	Jo Arai		Shooto 2025 Vol.4 (Tokyo) - Yuto Sekiguchi (*Title fight) (*May. 18)	13–12–1	0–2	Sep 2024
(Russia)	Alibek Gadzhammatov		Win - Rizin Landmark 10 (Nagoya) - Daichi Kitakata	5–0	1–0	Nov 2024

== Women's Strawweight (52,5 kg) ==
ISO	Name	Nickname	Result / next fight / status	MMA record	Rizin record	Last Rizin fight
(Japan)	Machi Fukuda		Rizin Landmark 11 (Sapporo) - Haruka Hasegawa	7–2	2–0	Mar 2025
(Japan)	Haruka Hasegawa	Salt	Rizin Landmark 11 (Sapporo) - Machi Fukuda	5–5	0–1	Jun 2023
(Japan)	Ayaka Watanabe		Loss - Shooto Colors Vol.3 (Tokyo) - Park Bo-hyun	3–3	0–1	Oct 2023

== Women's Super Atomweight (49 kg) ==
ISO	Name	Nickname	Result / next fight / status	MMA record	Rizin record	Last Rizin fight
(Japan)	Seika Izawa	Starflower	Win - Rizin 49 (Saitama) - Lucia Apdelgarim (*Non-Title fight)	15–0	9–0	Dec 2024
(Japan)	Rena Kubota	RENA	Win - Super Rizin 3 (Saitama) - Kate Oyama	15–5	14–4	Jul 2024
(Japan)	Ayaka Hamasaki		Win - Rizin Landmark 10 (Nagoya) - Shim Yu-ri	25–6	11–4	Nov 2024
(Japan)	Saori Oshima	Little Giant	Loss - Deep 125 Impact (Tokyo) - Lee Ye-ji	14–6	4–0	Feb 2024
(France)	Claire Lopez			8–7	1–2	Feb 2024
(Ukraine)	Anastasiya Svetkivska		Win - Rizin Landmark 7 (Baku) - Farida Abdueva	3–2	1–2	Nov 2023
(South Korea)	Shim Yu-ri		Rizin World Series in Korea (Incheon) - Kate Oyama	6–5	0–2	Nov 2024
(Japan)	Kate Oyama	Lotus	Rizin World Series in Korea (Incheon) - Shim Yu-ri	6–7	0–1	Jul 2024

== See also ==
- List of Rizin FF champions
- List of Rizin FF events
- 2025 in Rizin Fighting Federation
- List of current UFC fighters
- List of current ACA fighters
- List of current Brave CF fighters
- List of current Invicta FC fighters
- List of current KSW fighters
- List of current ONE fighters
- List of current PFL fighters
- List of current Road FC fighters
