= Victor Henry (fighter) =

American mixed martial arts fighter (born 1987)

- Born: Victor Westley Henry; May 4, 1987 (age 39); South Gate, California, U.S.
- Other names: La Mangosta
- Height: 5 ft 7 in (1.70 m)
- Weight: 135 lb (61 kg; 9 st 9 lb)
- Division: Bantamweight
- Reach: 68 in (173 cm)
- Fighting out of: South Gate, California, U.S.
- Team: UWF USA
- Trainer: Josh Barnett
- Years active: 2010–present

Mixed martial arts record
- Total: 33
- Wins: 25
- By knockout: 7
- By submission: 8
- By decision: 10
- Losses: 7
- By submission: 1
- By decision: 6
- No contests: 1

Other information
- Mixed martial arts record from Sherdog

Victor Westley Henry (born May 4, 1987) is an American mixed martial artist who competes in the Bantamweight division of the Ultimate Fighting Championship.

== Background ==
Growing up in a diverse but mostly black community as an individual, Henry always stood out. His mother's emphasis on staying out of trouble led him to school commitments and athletics. Despite a brief stint with baseball and soccer, it was a newspaper article about a nearby taekwondo gym that caught his mother's attention. Martial arts soon became a way for Henry to channel his energy and focus. He earned his black belt and then ventured into jiu-jitsu, with dreams of becoming a personal or medical trainer for professional sports teams. However, as he delved deeper into martial arts, he discovered a passion for MMA. Under the guidance of trainer Jimmie Romero, Henry's skills flourished, and he realized he had the potential to become a fighter. It was through Romero that he met his future mentor and supporter, Josh Barnett, during a seminar. Henry's eagerness to learn and improve his wrestling skills caught Barnett's attention, solidifying a partnership that would become a turning point in his journey as a fighter. Henry trained at Combat Submission Wrestling in Fullerton, where he honed his skills.

=== Catch wrestling ===
Besides MMA, he has also competed in catch wrestling. Henry won his weight class and the openweight division at the 2018 Billy Robinson Invitational. He then competed at The Snake Pit's 2018 Catch Wrestling World Championships, where he was the runner-up in the lightweight division. Henry won his weight class and the openweight division at the 2021 King of Catch tournament.

== Mixed martial arts career ==
=== Early career ===
In August 2010, Henry started his MMA career with a debut win in Pomona, California, securing a submission victory via rear-naked choke against Dillion Croushorn. They continued to excel, notching wins in Pomona in October 2010 and January 2012, where they showcased their skills with a guillotine choke victory over Bobby Sanchez in a catchweight (140 lb) match at Respect in the Cage 16. Their success continued with unanimous decision wins in May and July 2013, demonstrating their adaptability in various scenarios. Unfortunately, they faced a setback in April 2014 when they were defeated by Joe Murphy via split decision in Costa Mesa, California.

July 2014 brought a redemption moment in Tokyo, Japan, where they earned a TKO victory over Hideo Tokoro at Grandslam MMA: Way of the Cage, getting Henry back on the winning track.

=== Pancrase ===
With a quick return to America, Henry became the CS Bantamweight Champion in Tacoma, Washington, with a armbar win over Cory Vom Baur at CageSport 32. Returning to Japan, Henry's ascension continued in 2015, with victories over Masakatsu Ueda via kneebar submission victory at Grandslam MMA 2 and Taichi Nakajima, in his Pancrase debut at Pancrase 267 on May 31, 2015 via split decision, and Hidekazu Fukushima at Pancrase 270 via guillotine choke.

However, the road to success faced a setback, losing to Shintaro Ishiwatari in a unanimous decision at Pancrase 273 in Tokyo, Japan, for the Bantamweight King of Pancrase title. In the following years, the fighter's journey included a mixture of wins and losses, with unanimous decision win over Alan Yoshihiro Yamaniha at Pancrase 277 followed by split decision loss to Rafael Silva at Pancrase 282 and unanimous decision loss against Masakatsu Ueda at Pancrase 285.

In February 2018, the fighter returned by achieving a TKO victory over future UFC fighter Anderson dos Santos at KOTC: Energetic Pursuit. Henry continued his winning streak in August 2018, finishing Takafumi Otsuka via body kick knockout at Deep: 85 Impact.

Henry returned to America to secure a split decision win against Kyler Phillips at CXF 15: Rage in the Cage before traveling to Russia to defeat Denis Lavrentyev via unanimous decision at RCC 5.

=== Rizin Fighting Federation ===
In March 2019, the fighter claimed the DEEP Bantamweight Championship with a majority decision victory over Yuki Motoya at DEEP 88 Impact, claiming his first major title in Japan. After a brief stopover in Russia to finish Nikita Chistyakov via TKO stoppage at the end of the first round at RCC 6, Henry debuted in Rizin Fighting Federation with a reverse triangle armbar submission victory against Trent Girdham at Rizin 18 in Nagoya, Japan.

In his sophomore performance, Henry gained a TKO win via punches over Masanori Kanehara at Rizin 21 in Hamamatsu, Japan.

Due to the ongoing pandemic, Henry could not enter Japan and therefore was forced to take bouts outside of the country, with this decision resulting in a setback as he suffered a unanimous decision loss to Denis Lavrentyev at Parus FC in Dubai, United Arab Emirates, in a match for the Parus FC Bantamweight Championship.

However, the fighter made a strong comeback in October 2021, securing a submission victory with a rear-naked choke against Albert Morales at LXF 6 with this win earning him the LOXP Bantamweight Championship.

=== Ultimate Fighting Championship ===
Henry was signed to UFC as a replacement for Trevin Jones against Raoni Barcelos on December 18, 2021, at UFC Fight Night 199. The pairing was then cancelled just hours before taking place due to COVID-19 protocols, and rescheduled to meet on January 22, 2022, at UFC 270. Henry won the fight via unanimous decision.

Henry took on Raphael Assunção at UFC Fight Night 212 on October 15, 2022, losing the fight via unanimous decision.

Henry squared off against Tony Gravely on March 11, 2023, at UFC Fight Night 221. He won the fight via split decision.

Henry was scheduled to face Javid Basharat on September 23, 2023, at UFC Fight Night 228. However, Henry withdrew for unknown reasons and the bout was rescheduled for UFC 294 on October 21, 2023. The fight ended in no-contest after an unintentional groin kick by Basharat rendered Henry unable to continue.

Henry faced Rani Yahya on April 27, 2024, at UFC on ESPN 55. After landing two knockdowns, Henry won the bout by technical knockout in the third round.

Henry faced Charles Jourdain on November 2, 2024 at UFC Fight Night 246. He lost the fight via a guillotine choke submission in the second round, which was Henry's first career loss by finish.

Henry faced Pedro Falcão on April 5, 2025 at UFC on ESPN 65. He won the fight by unanimous decision.

Henry was scheduled to face Bryce Mitchell on June 6, 2026, at UFC Fight Night 278. In turn, Henry pulled out on May 28 and was replaced by Santiago Luna.

== Championships and accomplishments ==
=== Catch wrestling ===
- The Snake Pit
  - 2018 Catch Wrestling World Championships - runner-up, lightweight (68 kg)
- Other championships
  - Billy Robinson Invitational 2018 - champion, weight class and openweight
  - King of Catch 2021 - champion, weight class and openweight

=== Mixed martial arts ===
- Ultimate Fighting Championships
  - UFC.com Awards
    - Ranked #5 Upset of the Year vs. Raoni Barcelos
- DEEP
  - DEEP Bantamweight Championship (One time)
- Lights Out Xtreme Fighting
  - LOXF Bantamweight Championship (One time)
- CageSport
  - CS Bantamweight Championship (One time)

== Mixed martial arts record ==
Professional record breakdown
33 matches	25 wins	7 losses
By knockout	7	0
By submission	8	1
By decision	10	6
No contests	1	

Res.	Record	Opponent	Method	Event	Date	Round	Time	Location	Notes
Win	25–7 (1)	Pedro Falcão	Decision (unanimous)	UFC on ESPN: Emmett vs. Murphy	April 5, 2025	3	5:00	Las Vegas, Nevada, United States	
Loss	24–7 (1)	Charles Jourdain	Submission (guillotine choke)	UFC Fight Night: Moreno vs. Albazi	November 2, 2024	2	3:43	Edmonton, Alberta, Canada	
Win	24–6 (1)	Rani Yahya	TKO (head kick and punches)	UFC on ESPN: Nicolau vs. Perez	April 27, 2024	3	2:36	Las Vegas, Nevada, United States	
NC	23–6 (1)	Javid Basharat	NC (accidental groin kick)	UFC 294	October 21, 2023	2	0:15	Abu Dhabi, United Arab Emirates	Accidental groin kick rendered Henry unable to continue.
Win	23–6	Tony Gravely	Decision (split)	UFC Fight Night: Yan vs. Dvalishvili	March 11, 2023	3	5:00	Las Vegas, Nevada, United States	
Loss	22–6	Raphael Assunção	Decision (unanimous)	UFC Fight Night: Grasso vs. Araújo	October 15, 2022	3	5:00	Las Vegas, Nevada, United States	
Win	22–5	Raoni Barcelos	Decision (unanimous)	UFC 270	January 22, 2022	3	5:00	Anaheim, California, United States	
Win	21–5	Albert Morales	Submission (rear-naked choke)	Lights Out Xtreme Fighting 6	October 30, 2021	2	1:46	Burbank, California, United States	Won the LOXF Bantamweight Championship.
Loss	20–5	Denis Lavrentyev	Decision (unanimous)	Modern Fighting Pankration: Parus FC	November 7, 2020	3	5:00	Dubai, United Arab Emirates	For the Parus FC Bantamweight Championship.
Win	20–4	Masanori Kanehara	TKO (punches)	Rizin 21	February 22, 2020	2	0:45	Hamamatsu, Japan	
Win	19–4	Trent Girdham	Submission (reverse triangle armbar)	Rizin 18	August 18, 2019	3	2:14	Nagoya, Japan	
Win	18–4	Nikita Chistyakov	TKO (punches)	RCC 6	May 4, 2019	1	4:50	Chelyabinsk, Russia	
Win	17–4	Yuki Motoya	Decision (majority)	DEEP 88 Impact	March 9, 2019	3	5:00	Tokyo, Japan	Won the DEEP Bantamweight Championship.
Win	16–4	Denis Lavrentyev	Decision (unanimous)	RCC 5	December 15, 2018	3	5:00	Ekaterinburg, Russia	
Win	15–4	Kyler Phillips	Decision (split)	California Xtreme Fighting 15	October 20, 2018	3	5:00	Burbank, California, United States	
Win	14–4	Takafumi Otsuka	KO (body kick)	DEEP 85 Impact	August 26, 2018	3	1:36	Tokyo, Japan	
Win	13–4	Anderson dos Santos	TKO (doctor stoppage)	KOTC: Energetic Pursuit	February 24, 2018	2	5:00	Ontario, California, United States	
Loss	12–4	Masakatsu Ueda	Decision (unanimous)	Pancrase 285	March 12, 2017	3	5:00	Tokyo, Japan	
Loss	12–3	Rafael Silva	Decision (split)	Pancrase 282	November 13, 2016	3	5:00	Tokyo, Japan	
Win	12–2	Alan Yoshihiro Yamaniha	Decision (unanimous)	Pancrase 277	April 24, 2016	3	5:00	Tokyo, Japan	
Loss	11–2	Shintaro Ishiwatari	Decision (unanimous)	Pancrase 273	December 13, 2015	5	5:00	Tokyo, Japan	For the Pancrase Bantamweight Championship.
Win	11–1	Hidekazu Fukushima	Submission (guillotine choke)	Pancrase 270	October 4, 2015	1	4:32	Tokyo, Japan	
Win	10–1	Taichi Nakajima	Decision (split)	Pancrase 267	May 31, 2015	3	5:00	Tokyo, Japan	
Win	9–1	Masakatsu Ueda	Submission (kneebar)	Grandslam MMA 2	February 8, 2015	3	3:22	Tokyo, Japan	
Win	8–1	Cory Vom Baur	Submission (armbar)	CageSport 32	October 4, 2014	1	4:43	Tacoma, Washington, United States	Won the CS Bantamweight Championship.
Win	7–1	Hideo Tokoro	TKO (punches)	Grandslam MMA 1	July 13, 2014	2	1:52	Tokyo, Japan	
Loss	6–1	Joe Murphy	Decision (split)	Fight Club OC: Thursday Night Fights 20	April 17, 2014	3	5:00	Costa Mesa, California, United States	
Win	6–0	Jeff Martin	Submission (armbar)	BAMMA Badbeat 10	August 9, 2013	1	4:22	Commerce, California, United States	Submission of the Night.
Win	5–0	Kevin Michel	Decision (unanimous)	KOTC: Validation	July 11, 2013	3	5:00	Highland, California, United States	
Win	4–0	Bronson Casarez	Decision (unanimous)	Fight Club OC: Rumble on the Range 4	May 16, 2013	3	3:00	Burbank, California, United States	Catchweight (132 lb) bout.
Win	3–0	Bobby Sanchez	Submission (guillotine choke)	Respect in the Cage 16	January 21, 2012	1	1:34	Pomona, California, United States	Catchweight (140 lb) bout.
Win	2–0	Gary Mikayelyan	TKO (punches)	Respect in the Cage 8	October 9, 2010	N/A	N/A	Pomona, California, United States	
Win	1–0	Dillion Croushorn	Submission (rear-naked choke)	Respect in the Cage 7	August 21, 2010	2	2:36	Pomona, California, United States	Bantamweight debut.

== See also ==
- List of current UFC fighters
- List of male mixed martial artists
