= Javid Basharat =

British mixed martial artist

- Born: 7 September 1995 (age 31); Paktia, Afghanistan
- Other names: The Snow Leopard
- Height: 5 ft 9 in (1.75 m)
- Weight: 135 lb (61 kg; 9 st 9 lb)
- Division: Bantamweight
- Reach: 69 in (175 cm)
- Fighting out of: London, England
- Team: Xtreme Couture
- Years active: 2016–present

Mixed martial arts record
- Total: 19
- Wins: 16
- By knockout: 5
- By submission: 6
- By decision: 5
- Losses: 2
- By knockout: 1
- By decision: 1
- No contests: 1

Other information
- Notable relatives: Farid Basharat (brother)
- Mixed martial arts record from Sherdog

Javid Basharat (Pashto: جاوید بشارت ; born 7 September 1995) is an Afghan-born English mixed martial artist who competes in the Bantamweight division of the Professional Fighters League (PFL). He has also competed in the Ultimate Fighting Championship (UFC).

== Background ==
Javid and his younger brother Farid, who is also currently a UFC fighter, arrived in England from Afghanistan with their mother as refugees at the age of five, where they rejoined their father.

Basharat's journey in combat sports began with taekwondo at the age of 13, inspired by Afghanistan's Rohullah Nikpai's historic bronze medal win in the 2008 Summer Olympics in Beijing. His parents enrolled him in taekwondo for self-defense, recognizing his youthful energy and penchant for sparring with his brother. Although he initially honed his skills in England, Basharat hadn't yet heard of the UFC and was more familiar with the world of boxing. He was exposed to mixed martial arts at London Shootfighters.

== Mixed martial arts career ==
=== Early career ===
Basharat maintained an undefeated record, fighting mostly on the English regional scene, starting out with his debut TKO win over Gino Kroes at "Rise of Champions 2" in April 2016. He continued with victories via submissions and TKOs in the next 9 bouts, claiming the CON Bantamweight Championship in 2018 and defending it successfully.

Basharat was invited to compete on Dana White's Contender Series Season 5, where he faced Israeli fighter Oron Kahlon. Kahlon missed weight by four pounds and was fined 20% of his purse. At the promotional face-off, Basharat rejected a handshake due to the missed weight. Kahlon then called Basharat a "terrorist", sparking controversy. Basharat dominated the fight, finishing Kahlon with a guillotine choke in the third round to earn a UFC contract.

=== Ultimate Fighting Championship ===
In his UFC debut, Basharat faced Trevin Jones at UFC Fight Night 203 on 11 March 2022. He won the bout via unanimous decision.

Basharat faced Tony Gravely at UFC Fight Night 210 on 17 September 2022. He won the bout via unanimous decision.

Basharat faced Mateus Mendonça at UFC Fight Night 217 on 14 January 2023. He won the bout via unanimous decision.

Basharat was scheduled to face Victor Henry on 23 September 2023, at UFC Fight Night 228. However, Henry withdrew for unknown reasons and the bout was rescheduled for UFC 294 on 21 October 2023. The fight ended in no-contest after an unintentional groin kick by Basharat rendered Henry unable to continue.

Basharat faced Aiemann Zahabi on 2 March 2024, at UFC Fight Night 238. He lost the bout by unanimous decision.

Basharat was scheduled to face Chris Gutiérrez on 3 August 2024 at UFC on ABC 7. The bout was moved one week later to 10 August at UFC on ESPN 61. One week before the event, Basharat withdrew due to an injury and was replaced with promotional newcomer Quang Le.

Basharat faced former LFA Bantamweight Champion Ricky Simón on 22 February 2025 at UFC Fight Night 252. He lost the fight by knockout in the first round.

Basharat was scheduled to face Said Nurmagomedov on 7 February 2026 at UFC Fight Night 266. However, Nurmagomedov was forced to pull out due to visa issues and was replaced by promotional newcomer Gianni Vazquez on 2 days notice. At the weigh-ins, Vázquez weighed in at 141 pounds, five pounds over the bantamweight non-title fight limit, so he was fined 25 percent of his purse which went to Basharat. Basharat won the fight by unanimous decision.

On February 10, 2026, it was reported that Basharat's contract expired with the promotion, following winning his most recent bout.

=== Professional Fighters League ===
On June 24, 2026, it was reported that Basharat has officially signed with the Professional Fighters League.

Basharat made his PFL debut against Movsar Ibragimov on August 22, 2026, at PFL Tampa. He won the bout via unanimous decision.

== Championships and accomplishments ==
- Contenders Ltd
  - CON Bantamweight Championship (One time)
    - One successful title defence

== Mixed martial arts record ==
Professional record breakdown
19 matches	16 wins	2 losses
By knockout	5	1
By submission	6	0
By decision	5	1
No contests	1	

Res.	Record	Opponent	Method	Event	Date	Round	Time	Location	Notes
Win	16–2 (1)	Movsar Ibragimov	Decision (unanimous)	PFL Tampa: Cyborg vs. Vieira	August 22, 2026	3	5:00	Tampa, Florida, United States	
Win	15–2 (1)	Gianni Vázquez	Decision (unanimous)	UFC Fight Night: Bautista vs. Oliveira	7 February 2026	3	5:00	Las Vegas, Nevada, United States	Catchweight (141 lb) bout; Vázquez missed weight.
Loss	14–2 (1)	Ricky Simón	KO (punches)	UFC Fight Night: Cejudo vs. Song	22 February 2025	1	3:58	Seattle, Washington, United States	
Loss	14–1 (1)	Aiemann Zahabi	Decision (unanimous)	UFC Fight Night: Rozenstruik vs. Gaziev	2 March 2024	3	5:00	Las Vegas, Nevada, United States	
NC	14–0 (1)	Victor Henry	NC (accidental groin kick)	UFC 294	21 October 2023	2	0:15	Abu Dhabi, United Arab Emirates	Accidental groin kick rendered Henry unable to continue.
Win	14–0	Mateus Mendonça	Decision (unanimous)	UFC Fight Night: Strickland vs. Imavov	14 January 2023	3	5:00	Las Vegas, Nevada, United States	
Win	13–0	Tony Gravely	Decision (unanimous)	UFC Fight Night: Sandhagen vs. Song	17 September 2022	3	5:00	Las Vegas, Nevada, United States	
Win	12–0	Trevin Jones	Decision (unanimous)	UFC Fight Night: Santos vs. Ankalaev	12 March 2022	3	5:00	Las Vegas, Nevada, United States	
Win	11–0	Oron Kahlon	Submission (guillotine choke)	Dana White's Contender Series 45	26 October 2021	3	4:12	Las Vegas, Nevada, United States	Catchweight (139 lb) bout; Kahlon missed weight.
Win	10–0	Alexander Bezkorovayny	Submission (brabo choke)	Oktagon 19	5 December 2020	2	4:44	Brno, Czech Republic	
Win	9–0	Nicolas Savio	TKO (doctor stoppage)	Contenders Norwich 29	15 February 2020	1	N/A	Norwich, England	Defended the CON Bantamweight Championship.
Win	8–0	Wisam Mamoka	TKO (punches)	FightStar Championship 18	6 July 2019	1	0:51	London, England	Return to Bantamweight.
Win	7–0	John Spencer	TKO (punches)	UCMMA 59	11 May 2019	1	1:50	London, England	Featherweight debut.
Win	6–0	Ricardo Morais	Submission (rear-naked choke)	UCMMA 57	November 10, 2018	1	3:01	London, England	
Win	5–0	Julien Bouteix	Submission (rear-naked choke)	Contenders Norwich 23	April 28, 2018	1	3:22	Norwich, England	Won the CON Bantamweight Championship.
Win	4–0	Tony Hall	Submission (guillotine choke)	BAMMA 31	15 September 2017	2	1:42	London, England	
Win	3–0	Oleksandr Bilobrovaka	TKO (punches)	Celtic Gladiator 12	20 May 2017	1	1:33	Grays, England	
Win	2–0	Ionut Raducanu	Submission (heel hook)	UCMMA 48	6 September 2016	1	N/A	Romford, England	
Win	1–0	Gino Kroes	TKO (elbows)	Rise of Champions 2	23 April 2016	1	1:58	Romford, England	Bantamweight debut.

== See also ==
- List of current PFL fighters
- List of male mixed martial artists
