= Kyoji Horiguchi =

Japanese mixed martial artist

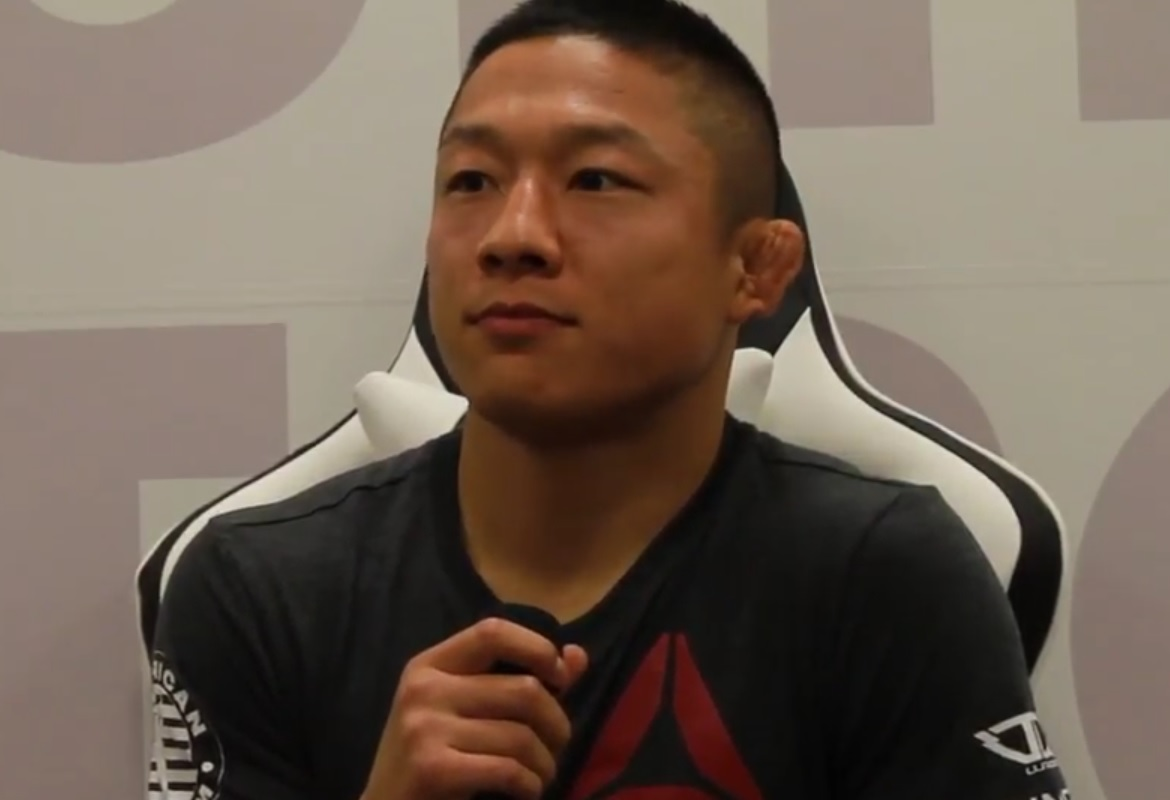
- Born: October 12, 1990 (age 36); Takasaki, Gunma, Japan
- Native name: 堀口恭司
- Other names: The Supernova (former), The Typhoon
- Nickname: Karate Kid
- Height: 5 ft 5 in (1.65 m)
- Weight: 126 lb (57 kg; 9 st 0 lb)
- Division: Bantamweight; Flyweight
- Reach: 66 in (168 cm)
- Style: Shotokan Karate, Kickboxing, Shootfighting
- Fighting out of: Coconut Creek, Florida, U.S.
- Team: KRAZY BEE (2009–2015); American Top Team (2015–present)
- Trainer: Norifumi Yamamoto; Mike Brown
- Rank: A-Class Shootist; 2nd degree black belt in Shotokan Karate
- Years active: 2010–present

Mixed martial arts record
- Total: 44
- Wins: 37
- By knockout: 15
- By submission: 6
- By decision: 16
- Losses: 6
- By knockout: 3
- By submission: 1
- By decision: 2
- No contests: 1

Other information
- Website: https://horiguchikyoji.com/
- Mixed martial arts record from Sherdog

YouTube information
- Channel: Kyoji Horiguchi
- Subscribers: 351 thousand
- Views: 85 million
- Last updated: February 8, 2026

Kyoji Horiguchi (Japanese: 堀口 恭司, Horiguchi Kyōji; born October 12, 1990) is a Japanese mixed martial artist currently competing in the flyweight division of the Ultimate Fighting Championship. He formerly competed in the Flyweight and Bantamweight divisions of Rizin FF, where he was the inaugural Flyweight Champion and the inaugural and two-time Bantamweight Champion. He also competed in the Bantamweight division of Bellator MMA, where he was the Bantamweight World Champion. As of October 24, 2026, he is #7 in the Meta UFC flyweight rankings.

A professional since 2010, Horiguchi competed from 2013 to 2016 in his first stint with the Ultimate Fighting Championship where he was a UFC Flyweight Championship challenger. He also competed in Shooto, where he was the Bantamweight Champion. He graduated from Sakushin Gakuin High School in Utsunomiya, Tochigi, Japan.

== Background ==
Horiguchi began training in karate at the age of five and was talented, as he soon began competing in full-contact competitions and went on to become a regional champion. At the age of 16, Horiguchi viewed a PRIDE Fighting Championships event and became drawn to mixed martial arts. Horiguchi began training in the sport at Norifumi Yamamoto's Krazy Bee Gym after graduating high school when he was 18 years old. Horiguchi said seeing Yamamoto knockout bigger men was what drew him to the fighter.

== Mixed martial arts career ==
=== Shooto ===
Horiguchi made his professional MMA debut in Shooto in 2010, winning a decision over Ranki Kawana. Prior to this, Horiguchi was Bantamweight fighter, Norifumi Yamamoto's sparring partner. Just two fights later he would win the Shooto 2010 Rookie Tournament, finishing Seiji Akao by TKO early in the second round.

His biggest victory up to that time would come over the 2009 Rookie Tournament runner-up, Yuta Nezu. Horiguchi's knockout power was on display early, knocking out Nezu in the first round. His nickname is The Typhoon.

Horiguchi took on the former Shooto Bantamweight Champion, Masakatsu Ueda on January 8, 2012. Ueda controlled most of the bout with his superior grappling, nearly submitting Horiguchi numerous times. He lost by a majority decision.

Horiguchi captured the Shooto Bantamweight Championship on March 16, 2013, when he defeated Hiromasa Ougikubo submitting him in the second round by rear-naked choke.

On June 22, Horiguchi fought Pancrase Bantamweight Champion, Shintaro Ishiwatari, at VTJ 2nd, where Horiguchi acted as a Shooto representative. The two engaged in a competitive, back and forth fight. Many outlets had Ishiwatari leading on the scorecards heading into the final round. Horiguchi rallied early in the fifth round, landing a barrage of punches on Ishiwatari to force the stoppage and defend his title.

=== Ultimate Fighting Championship ===
Horiguchi made his promotional debut against Dustin Pague on October 19, 2013, at UFC 166. He was victorious in his debut, winning the fight via TKO in the second round.

Horiguchi was expected to face Chris Cariaso in a Flyweight bout on February 1, 2014, at UFC 169. However, Horiguchi pulled out of the bout citing injury and was replaced by WEC veteran Danny Martinez.

Horiguchi faced Darrell Montague on May 10, 2014, at UFC Fight Night 40. He won the fight via unanimous decision.

A rescheduled bout with Chris Cariaso was expected to take place on September 20, 2014, at UFC Fight Night 52. However, Cariaso was pulled from the bout with Horiguchi in favor of a matchup with current flyweight champion Demetrious Johnson at UFC 178. Horiguchi instead faced Jon Delos Reyes. He won the fight via TKO in the first round.

Horoguchi faced Louis Gaudinot on January 3, 2015, at UFC 182. He won the fight by unanimous decision.

Horiguchi faced Flyweight champion Demetrious Johnson on April 25, 2015, in the main event at UFC 186. Despite doing well during the first round, Horiguchi lost the otherwise one-sided fight via an armbar submission at 4:59 of the fifth round, resulting in the latest finish in UFC history.

Horiguchi faced Chico Camus at UFC Fight Night 75 on September 27, 2015. He won the fight by unanimous decision.

Horiguchi next faced Neil Seery on May 8, 2016, at UFC Fight Night 87. He won the fight via unanimous decision.

Horiguchi was expected to face Ali Bagautinov on October 15, 2016, at UFC Fight Night 97. However, the promotion announced on October 6 that they had cancelled the event entirely. In turn, the pairing was quickly rescheduled and took place on November 19, 2016, at UFC Fight Night 99. He won the fight via unanimous decision.

It was announced on February 17, 2017, that Horiguchi chose not to renew his contract with the UFC.

=== Rizin Fighting Federation ===
In joining RIZIN, Horiguchi says he felt more at home and enjoyed the shows RIZIN put on built around him.

On April 16, 2017, Horiguchi made his debut in Rizin Fighting Federation, where he defeated Yuki Motoya by unanimous decision.

Horiguichi next faced Hideo Tokoro in the first round of the Rizin Bantamweight Grand Prix on July 30, 2017, at Rizin 6. He won the fight via knockout in the first round.

Horiguchi competed in the rest of the Bantamweight Grand Prix in December 2017, fighting three times over two days. In the quarter-finals, he faced Gabriel Oliviera on December 29, 2017, at Rizin World Grand Prix 2017: 2nd Round. He won the fight via TKO in the first round. He advanced to the next round, which was held on December 31, 2017, at Rizin World Grand Prix 2017: Final Round. He faced Manel Kape in the semi-finals and won via arm-triangle choke submission in the third round. In the final, he faced Shintaro Ishiwatari and won via knockout early into the second round to become the inaugural RIZIN Bantamweight Champion.

Horiguchi faced fellow UFC veteran Ian McCall in the main event at Rizin 10 on May 6, 2018. He defeated McCall just 9 seconds into the first round via KO. This was the second fastest stoppage in Rizin history.

After a 9-second knockout victory, Horiguchi made a quick turnaround to face fellow Japanese champion Hiromasa Ougikubo in a long-awaited rematch. Ogikubo, the current Shooto bantamweight champion, had not lost since he last faced Horiguchi in 2013. Horiguchi won the bout via unanimous decision.

On September 30, 2018, Horiguchi fought Japanese Kickboxer Tenshin Nasukawa at Rizin 13 under Rizin Kickboxing rules, and lost by unanimous decision.

Horiguchi faced the reigning Bellator Bantamweight champion Darrion Caldwell for the vacant Rizin Bantamweight Championship at Rizin 14 on December 31, 2018. He won the fight by submission via a guillotine choke.

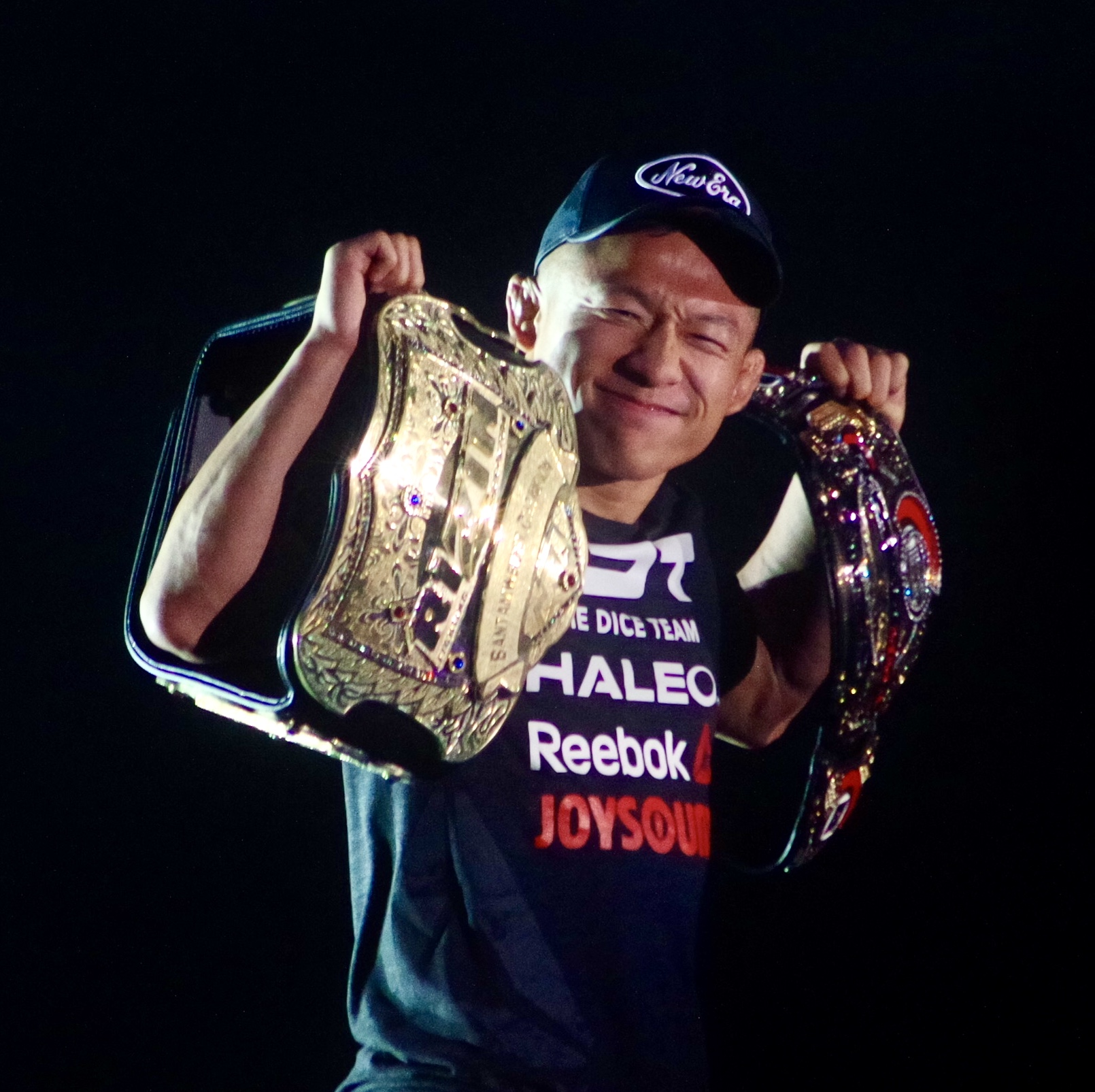
Horiguchi with Bellator and Rizin belts in 2019.

Horiguchi next faced Ben Nguyen in a 132 pound catchweight bout on April 21, 2019, at Rizin 15. He won the fight via TKO in the first round.

Horiguchi headlined Rizin 18 on August 18, 2019, against Kai Asakura in a non-title bout. He lost the fight via technical knockout in the first round.

Horiguchi was expected to defend his Rizin FF Bantamweight Championship title against Kai Asakura in a rematch at Rizin 20 on December 31, 2019. However, Horiguchi pulled out of the fight in mid-November citing a knee injury that is expected to keep him out of action for approximately 10 – 12 months. In turn, his bantamweight title has been vacated.

=== Bellator MMA ===
In April 2019, it was announced that Horiguchi would face Darrion Caldwell for the Bellator Bantamweight title on June 14, 2019, at Bellator 222. The pair previously fought in December 2018 in the Rizin promotion with Horiguchi winning by submission. Scott Coker, president of Bellator MMA disclosed to the media that Horiguchi's contract features a rematch clause. Should Horiguchi win the rematch, he will be obligated to defend the Bellator belt once a year. Horiguchi won the bout and title by unanimous decision. However, due to the injury suffered in October 2019, Horiguchi vacated his Bellator Bantamweight championship in late November 2019.

After undergoing a successful knee surgery, Horiguchi is set to make his return to mixed martial arts, following a 15 month hiatus from the sport. He rematched Kai Asakura during Rizin 26 – Saitama. Going into the rematch with Asakura, Horiguchi said it was his goal to dispel any rumors about ACL injuries finishing an athlete's career. Horiguchi said he is also feeling almost completely healed leading into the fight. “I'm about 100% recovered. I had to start from zero after the surgery and built back the muscles that have gotten weak. But the hard work and long rehab has paid off and I am back.” Horiguchi won the fight by a first-round TKO.

In September 2021, Horiguchi was announced to be a Bellator contracted fighter, however due to longstanding relationship between Bellator and Rizin, Horiguchi will remain the Rizin Bantamweight Champion, and the plan, once COVID travel restrictions ease, is for him to still fight in Japan on occasion.

Horiguchi competed for the Bellator Bantamweight World Championship against champion Sergio Pettis on December 3, 2021, at Bellator 272. Despite having controlled most of the bout beforehand, Horiguchi lost the fight via knockout in round four.

In the first round bout of the $1 million Bellator Bantamweight World Grand Prix Tournament, Horiguchi faced Patchy Mix on April 23, 2022, at Bellator 279. He lost the bout via unanimous decision.

=== Return to Rizin and Flyweight ===
Horiguchi faced Yuto Hokamura at Rizin 38 on September 25, 2022. After surviving an early knockdown, Horiguchi won the bout via a technical submission in the second round.

Moving down to Flyweight, Horiguchi faced Hiromasa Ougikubo at Bellator MMA vs. Rizin on December 31, 2022. Vacating the RIZIN Bantamweight Championship before the bout as he intends to fight at flyweight going into the future, Horiguchi dominated Ougikubo in his return to flyweight after 5 years on the way to a unanimous decision victory.

Horiguchi was scheduled to face Ray Borg on April 22, 2023, at Bellator 295. However, the day of the weigh-ins, due to weight-management complications for Borg, the bout was scrapped.

Horiguchi next competed for the inaugural Bellator Flyweight World Championship at Bellator MMA x Rizin 2 on July 30, 2023, in Saitama, Japan where he faced Makoto "Shinryu" Takahashi. The bout was declared a no contest after Horiguchi accidentally poked Takahashi in the eye which prevented him from continuing.

Horiguchi rematched Makoto Takahashi at Rizin 45, on December 31, 2023, this time for the inaugural Rizin Flyweight World Championship, and won the bout via rear-naked choke in the second round.

Horiguchi faced Sergio Pettis in a rematch at Bantamweight on June 9, 2024 at RIZIN 47. Horiguchi won the fight via unanimous decision.

Horiguchi made his first defense of the Rizin Flyweight World Championship against Nkazimulo Zulu on December 31, 2024, at Rizin 49. He won the bout via unanimous decision.

On March 30, 2025, Horiguchi announced that he had vacated the Rizin Flyweight World Championship and that he would be returning to the UFC.

=== Return to the UFC ===
On March 28, 2025, it was reported that Horiguchi had re-signed with the UFC.

Horiguchi was scheduled to have his first bout in the UFC since November 2016 against Tagir Ulanbekov on June 21, 2025, at UFC on ABC 8. However, Horiguchi withdrew from the bout for unknown reasons and was replaced by Azat Maksum. The bout was re-scheduled and took place on November 22, 2025, at UFC Fight Night 265. Horiguchi won the fight via a rear-naked choke submission in the third round. This fight earned him his first Performance of the Night award.

Horiguchi faced Amir Albazi on February 7, 2026, at UFC Fight Night 266. He won the fight by unanimous decision.

Horiguchi faced Manel Kape in a rematch on June 20, 2026 in the main event at UFC Fight Night 279. He lost the fight by technical knockout in the third round.

Horiguchi faced Asu Almabayev on November 21, 2026 at UFC Fight Night 294. He won the fight by unanimous decision.

== Championships and accomplishments ==
=== Mixed martial arts ===
- Ultimate Fighting Championship
  - Performance of the Night (One time) vs. Tagir Ulanbekov
  - Tied (Deiveson Figueiredo & Tatsuro Taira) for the sixth longest win streak in UFC Flyweight division history (5)
  - Tied (Tim Elliott, Joseph Benavidez & Joshua Van) for most decision wins in UFC Flyweight division history (7)
- Rizin Fighting Federation
  - RIZIN Flyweight Championship (One time, current)
    - One successful title defense
  - RIZIN Bantamweight Championship (Two times)
  - 2017 RIZIN Bantamweight Grand Prix Championship
- Bellator MMA
  - Bellator Bantamweight World Championship (One time)
- Shooto
  - Shooto Bantamweight Championship (One time; former)
    - One successful title defense
  - Shooto 2010 Rookie Tournament winner
- MMA Sucka
  - 2018 Fighter of the Year
- MMA Fighting
  - 2025 Promo of the Year at UFC Fight Night: Tsarukyan vs. Hooker

== Mixed martial arts record ==
Professional record breakdown
44 matches	37 wins	6 losses
By knockout	15	3
By submission	6	1
By decision	16	2
No contests	1	

Res.	Record	Opponent	Method	Event	Date	Round	Time	Location	Notes
Win	37–6 (1)	Asu Almabayev	Decision (unanimous)	UFC Fight Night: Procházka vs. Stirling	November 21, 2026	3	5:00	Al Rayyan, Qatar	
Loss	36–6 (1)	Manel Kape	TKO (punches)	UFC Fight Night: Kape vs. Horiguchi	June 20, 2026	3	2:42	Las Vegas, Nevada, United States	
Win	36–5 (1)	Amir Albazi	Decision (unanimous)	UFC Fight Night: Bautista vs. Oliveira	February 7, 2026	3	5:00	Las Vegas, Nevada, United States	
Win	35–5 (1)	Tagir Ulanbekov	Technical Submission (rear-naked choke)	UFC Fight Night: Tsarukyan vs. Hooker	November 22, 2025	3	2:18	Al Rayyan, Qatar	Performance of the Night.
Win	34–5 (1)	Nkazimulo Zulu	Decision (unanimous)	Rizin 49	December 31, 2024	3	5:00	Saitama, Japan	Defended the Rizin Flyweight Championship. Later vacated the title on March 30, 2025.
Win	33–5 (1)	Sergio Pettis	Decision (unanimous)	Rizin 47	June 9, 2024	3	5:00	Tokyo, Japan	Bantamweight bout.
Win	32–5 (1)	Makoto Takahashi	Submission (rear-naked choke)	Rizin 45	December 31, 2023	2	3:44	Saitama, Japan	Won the inaugural Rizin Flyweight Championship.
NC	31–5 (1)	Makoto Takahashi	NC (accidental eye poke)	Bellator MMA vs. Rizin 2	July 30, 2023	1	0:25	Saitama, Japan	For the inaugural Bellator Flyweight World Championship. Accidental eye poke rendered Takahashi unable to continue.
Win	31–5	Hiromasa Ougikubo	Decision (unanimous)	Bellator MMA vs. Rizin	December 31, 2022	3	5:00	Saitama, Japan	Return to Flyweight.
Win	30–5	Yuto Hokamura	Technical Submission (arm-triangle choke)	Rizin 38	September 25, 2022	2	2:59	Saitama, Japan	Non-title bout.
Loss	29–5	Patchy Mix	Decision (unanimous)	Bellator 279	April 23, 2022	5	5:00	Honolulu, Hawaii, United States	Bellator Bantamweight World Grand Prix Quarterfinal.
Loss	29–4	Sergio Pettis	KO (spinning backfist)	Bellator 272	December 3, 2021	4	3:24	Uncasville, Connecticut, United States	For the Bellator Bantamweight World Championship.
Win	29–3	Kai Asakura	TKO (punches)	Rizin 26	December 31, 2020	1	2:48	Saitama, Japan	Won the Rizin Bantamweight Championship. Later vacated the title in December 2022.
Loss	28–3	Kai Asakura	KO (punches)	Rizin 18	August 18, 2019	1	1:07	Nagoya, Japan	Non-title bout.
Win	28–2	Darrion Caldwell	Decision (unanimous)	Bellator 222	June 14, 2019	5	5:00	New York City, New York, United States	Won the Bellator Bantamweight World Championship. Later vacated the title in November 2019 due to injury.
Win	27–2	Ben Nguyen	KO (punches)	Rizin 15	April 21, 2019	1	2:53	Yokohama, Japan	Catchweight (132 lb) bout.
Win	26–2	Darrion Caldwell	Submission (guillotine choke)	Rizin 14	December 31, 2018	3	1:19	Saitama, Japan	Won the inaugural Rizin Bantamweight Championship. Later vacated the title in November 2019 due to injury.
Win	25–2	Hiromasa Ougikubo	Decision (unanimous)	Rizin 11	July 29, 2018	2	5:00	Saitama, Japan	Catchweight (132 lb) bout.
Win	24–2	Ian McCall	KO (punch)	Rizin 10	May 6, 2018	1	0:09	Fukuoka, Japan	
Win	23–2	Shintaro Ishiwatari	KO (punches)	Rizin World Grand Prix 2017: Final Round	December 31, 2017	2	0:14	Saitama, Japan	Won the 2017 Rizin Bantamweight Grand Prix.
Win	22–2	Manel Kape	Submission (arm-triangle choke)	Rizin World Grand Prix 2017: Final Round	December 31, 2017	3	4:27	Saitama, Japan	2017 Rizin Bantamweight Grand Prix Semifinal.
Win	21–2	Gabriel Oliveira	TKO (punches)	Rizin World Grand Prix 2017: 2nd Round	December 29, 2017	1	4:30	Saitama, Japan	2017 Rizin Bantamweight Grand Prix Quarterfinal.
Win	20–2	Hideo Tokoro	KO (punches)	Rizin World Grand Prix 2017: 1st Round	July 30, 2017	1	1:49	Saitama, Japan	Return to Bantamweight. 2017 Rizin Bantamweight Grand Prix First Round.
Win	19–2	Yuki Motoya	Decision (unanimous)	Rizin 5	April 16, 2017	2	5:00	Yokohama, Japan	Catchweight (128 lb) bout.
Win	18–2	Ali Bagautinov	Decision (unanimous)	UFC Fight Night: Mousasi vs. Hall 2	November 19, 2016	3	5:00	Belfast, Northern Ireland	
Win	17–2	Neil Seery	Decision (unanimous)	UFC Fight Night: Overeem vs. Arlovski	May 8, 2016	3	5:00	Rotterdam, Netherlands	
Win	16–2	Chico Camus	Decision (unanimous)	UFC Fight Night: Barnett vs. Nelson	September 27, 2015	3	5:00	Saitama, Japan	
Loss	15–2	Demetrious Johnson	Submission (armbar)	UFC 186	April 25, 2015	5	4:59	Montreal, Quebec, Canada	For the UFC Flyweight Championship.
Win	15–1	Louis Gaudinot	Decision (unanimous)	UFC 182	January 3, 2015	3	5:00	Las Vegas, Nevada, United States	
Win	14–1	Jon delos Reyes	TKO (punches)	UFC Fight Night: Hunt vs. Nelson	September 20, 2014	1	3:48	Saitama, Japan	
Win	13–1	Darrell Montague	Decision (unanimous)	UFC Fight Night: Brown vs. Silva	May 10, 2014	3	5:00	Cincinnati, Ohio, United States	Flyweight debut.
Win	12–1	Dustin Pague	TKO (punches)	UFC 166	October 19, 2013	2	3:51	Houston, Texas, United States	
Win	11–1	Shintaro Ishiwatari	TKO (punches)	Vale Tudo Japan 2nd	June 22, 2013	5	0:41	Tokyo, Japan	Defended the Shooto Bantamweight Championship.
Win	10–1	Hiromasa Ougikubo	Submission (rear-naked choke)	Shooto: 2nd Round 2013	March 16, 2013	2	1:35	Tokyo, Japan	Won the Shooto Bantamweight Championship.
Win	9–1	Ian Loveland	Decision (unanimous)	Vale Tudo Japan 1st	December 24, 2012	3	5:00	Tokyo, Japan	
Win	8–1	Manabu Inoue	Decision (unanimous)	Shooto: 8th Round 2012	July 16, 2012	3	5:00	Tokyo, Japan	
Win	7–1	Tetsu Suzuki	TKO (punches)	Shooto: 3rd Round 2012	March 10, 2012	1	2:06	Tokyo, Japan	
Loss	6–1	Masakatsu Ueda	Decision (majority)	Shooto: Survivor Tournament Final	January 8, 2012	3	5:00	Tokyo, Japan	
Win	6–0	Naohiro Mizuno	KO (punches)	Shooto: Shootor's Legacy 4	September 23, 2011	2	3:26	Tokyo, Japan	
Win	5–0	Yuta Nezu	KO (punch)	Shooto: Shootor's Legacy 3	July 18, 2011	1	3:17	Tokyo, Japan	
Win	4–0	Takahiro Hosoi	TKO (punches)	Shooto: Shooto Tradition 2011	April 29, 2011	1	1:06	Tokyo, Japan	
Win	3–0	Seiji Akao	TKO (punches)	Shooto: The Rookie Tournament 2010 Final	December 18, 2010	2	0:43	Tokyo, Japan	Won the 2010 Shooto Rookie Tournament.
Win	2–0	Keita Ishibashi	TKO (doctor stoppage)	Shooto: Gig Tokyo 5	August 7, 2010	1	2:23	Tokyo, Japan	
Win	1–0	Ranki Kawana	Decision (unanimous)	Shooto: Kitazawa Shooto Vol. 3	May 9, 2010	2	5:00	Tokyo, Japan	Bantamweight debut.

== Kickboxing record ==
0 wins (0 KOs), 1 losses
Result	Record	Opponent	Method	Event	Date	Round	Time	Location	Notes
Loss	0–1	Tenshin Nasukawa	Decision (unanimous)	Rizin 13	September 30, 2018	3	3:00	Saitama, Japan	
Legend Win Loss Draw/No contest

== See also ==
- List of current UFC fighters
- List of male mixed martial artists
- Double champions in MMA
