= Takafumi Otsuka =

Japanese mixed martial artist

Takafumi Otsuka 大塚隆史
- Born: August 22, 1986 (age 40); Japan
- Nationality: Japanese
- Height: 5 ft 6 in (168 cm)
- Weight: 135 lb (61 kg; 9 st 9 lb)
- Division: Bantamweight; Featherweight; Lightweight
- Team: AACC; T-Grip Tokyo
- Years active: 2006–present

Mixed martial arts record
- Total: 50
- Wins: 29
- By knockout: 5
- By submission: 5
- By decision: 19
- Losses: 19
- By knockout: 2
- By submission: 4
- By decision: 13
- Draws: 2

Other information
- Mixed martial arts record from Sherdog

Takafumi Otsuka Japanese: 大塚隆史 (born August 22, 1986) is a Japanese mixed martial artist. He competed in the bantamweight, featherweight and lightweight division. A professional mixed martial artist since 2006, Otsuka is a two-time DEEP Bantamweight Champion and a one-time DEEP Featherweight Champion.

== Mixed martial arts career ==
=== Early career ===
Otsuka made his professional MMA debut in October 2006 and lost the bout via submission in the second round.

=== Deep ===
Although Otsuka fought for various promotions over the first ten years of his career, he primarily competed for the Deep promotion in Japan with over 25 bouts held there.

Otsuka challenged Dokonjonosuke Mishima for the DEEP Featherweight Championship at Deep: 43 Impact on August 23, 2009. He won the fight and claimed the title via unanimous decision.

Otsuka made his first title defense attempt against Yoshiro Maeda at Deep 57: Impact on February 18, 2012. However, he lost the title via second-round submission.

In April 2014, Otsuka faced Kenji Osawa for the vacant DEEP Bantamweight Championship at Deep: 66 Impact. He won the bout and title via unanimous decision.

=== Rizin FF ===
In July 2017, Otsuka made his debut for Rizin Fighting Federation. He faced Anthony Birchak in the first round of the Rizin Bantamweight Grand Prix on July 30, 2017 at Rizin 6 and won the fight via split decision.

=== Shooto ===
Otsuka made his promotional debut in Shooto against Tatsuya Ando at Shooto 1123 on November 23, 2020. He won the fight via technical knockout after Ando injured his knee.

Otsuka then challenged Ryo Okada for the Shooto Featherweight Championship at Shooto 0320 on March 20, 2021. He lost the fight via unanimous decision.

=== Rizin Bantamweight Grand Prix 2021 ===
Otsuka faced Hiroki Yamashita in the opening round of the Bantamweight Grand Prix at Rizin 29 on May 30, 2021. He won the bout via unanimous decision.

Otsuka was scheduled to face Hiromasa Ougikubo in the quarterfinals on September 19, 2021 at Rizin 30. He lost the fight by unanimous decision.

== Championships and Accomplishments ==
- Deep
  - Deep Bantamweight Championship (Two times)
    - Three Successful Title Defenses
  - Deep Featherweight Championship (One time)

== Mixed martial arts record ==
Professional record breakdown
50 matches	29 wins	19 losses
By knockout	5	2
By submission	5	4
By decision	19	13
Draws	2	

Res.	Record	Opponent	Method	Event	Date	Round	Time	Location	Notes
Loss	29–19–2	Hiromasa Ougikubo	Decision (unanimous)	Rizin 30	September 19, 2021	3	5:00	Saitama, Japan	2021 Rizin Bantamweight Grand Prix Quarterfinal.
Win	29–18–2	Hiroki Yamashita	Decision (unanimous)	Rizin 29	June 27, 2021	3	5:00	Osaka, Japan	2021 Rizin Bantamweight Grand Prix Opening Round.
Loss	28–18–2	Ryo Okada	Decision (unanimous)	Shooto 0320	March 20, 2021	3	5:00	Tokyo, Japan	For the Shooto Featherweight Championship.
Win	28–17–2	Tatsuya Ando	TKO (knee injury)	Shooto 1123	November 23, 2020	1	2:12	Tokyo, Japan	Featherweight bout.
Loss	27–17–2	Yuki Motoya	Decision (unanimous)	Deep: 94 Impact	March 1, 2020	3	5:00	Tokyo, Japan	
Win	27–16–2	Yuki Takano	Decision (unanimous)	Deep: 93 Impact	December 15, 2019	3	5:00	Tokyo, Japan	
Win	26–16–2	Rikuto Shirakawa	TKO (shoulder injury)	Deep: 91 Impact	September 8, 2019	1	0:26	Tokyo, Japan	
Loss	25–16–2	Trevin Jones	Submission (rear-naked choke)	Deep: 89 Impact	May 12, 2019	2	1:40	Tokyo, Japan	
Win	25–15–2	Seiji Akao	Decision (unanimous)	Deep: 87 Impact	December 22, 2018	3	5:00	Tokyo, Japan	
Loss	24–15–2	Victor Henry	KO (kick to the body)	Deep: 85 Impact	August 26, 2018	3	1:36	Tokyo, Japan	
Loss	24–14–2	Shintaro Ishiwatari	Decision (unanimous)	Rizin World Grand Prix 2017: Final Round	December 31, 2017	3	15:00	Saitama, Japan	2017 Rizin Bantamweight Grand Prix Semifinal.
Win	24–13–2	Khalid Taha	Submission (guillotine choke)	Rizin World Grand Prix 2017: 2nd Round	December 29, 2017	3	7:22	Saitama, Japan	2017 Rizin Bantamweight Grand Prix Quarterfinal.
Win	23–13–2	Anthony Birchak	Decision (split)	Rizin World Grand Prix 2017: Opening Round - Part 1	July 30, 2017	2	5:00	Saitama, Japan	2017 Rizin Bantamweight Grand Prix Opening Round.
Win	22–13–2	Koichi Ishizuka	Decision (split)	Deep: 77 Impact x DEEP JEWELS 13	May 13, 2017	3	5:00	Tokyo, Japan	Defended the DEEP Bantamweight Championship.
Win	21–13–2	Baataryn Azjavkhlan	Submission (rear-naked choke)	Deep: 77 Impact x DEEP JEWELS 13	August 27, 2016	3	5:00	Tokyo, Japan	
Win	20–13–2	Daisuke Endo	Decision (unanimous)	Deep: 75 Impact: 15th Anniversary	February 27, 2016	3	5:00	Tokyo, Japan	
Draw	19–13–2	Ken Saotome	Technical Draw (accidental clash of heads)	Deep: 74 Impact	December 20, 2015	1	0:30	Tokyo, Japan	
Win	19–13–1	Toshiaki Kitada	Decision (unanimous)	Deep: 72 Impact	May 16, 2015	3	5:00	Tokyo, Japan	Defended the DEEP Bantamweight Championship.
Loss	18–13–1	Shintaro Ishiwatari	TKO (punch)	Deep: Dream Impact 2014: Omisoka Special	December 31, 2014	1	3:30	Saitama, Japan	
Win	18–12–1	Toshinori Tsunemura	Submission (guillotine choke)	Deep: 69 Impact	October 26, 2014	3	4:46	Tokyo, Japan	Defended the DEEP Bantamweight Championship.
Win	17–12–1	Kenji Osawa	Decision (unanimous)	Deep: 66 Impact	April 29, 2014	3	5:00	Tokyo, Japan	Won the vacant DEEP Bantamweight Championship.
Win	16–12–1	Toshiaki Kitada	Decision (unanimous)	Deep: Cage Impact 2013	November 24, 2013	3	5:00	Tokyo, Japan	
Loss	15–12–1	Yoon Jun Lee	Decision (unanimous)	Road FC 12: Road Fighting Championship 12	June 22, 2013	3	5:00	Wonju, Gwandong, South Korea	
Win	15–11–1	Makoto Kamaya	Decision (unanimous)	Deep: 62 Impact	April 26, 2013	3	5:00	Tokyo, Japan	
Win	14–11–1	Seiji Akao	Decision (unanimous)	Deep: Cage Impact 2012 in Tokyo: 2nd Round	December 8, 2012	2	5:00	Tokyo, Japan	
Win	13–11–1	Naohiro Mizuno	Decision (unanimous)	Deep: 60 Impact	October 19, 2012	2	5:00	Tokyo, Japan	
Loss	12–11–1	Tatsumitsu Wada	Decision (majority)	Deep: Cage Impact 2012 in Tokyo: Over Again	April 7, 2012	3	5:00	Tokyo, Japan	
Loss	12–10–1	Yoshiro Maeda	Submission (rear-naked choke)	Deep: 57 Impact	February 18, 2012	2	3:13	Tokyo, Japan	Lost the DEEP Bantamweight Championship.
Loss	12–9–1	Bibiano Fernandes	Technical Submission (rear-naked choke)	Dream 17	September 24, 2011	1	0:41	Saitama, Saitama, Japan	
Win	12–8–1	Hiroshi Nakamura	Decision (unanimous)	Deep: 54 Impact	June 24, 2011	3	5:00	Tokyo, Japan	Won the vacant DEEP Bantamweight Championship.
Loss	11–8–1	Kenji Osawa	Decision (split)	Dream: Fight for Japan!	May 29, 2011	2	5:00	Saitama, Saitama, Japan	
Win	11–7–1	Tomohiko Hori	Decision (unanimous)	Deep: 51 Impact	December 11, 2010	3	5:00	Tokyo, Japan	
Loss	10–7–1	Yoshiro Maeda	Decision (majority)	Deep: 50 Impact	October 24, 2010	3	5:00	Tokyo, Japan	
Loss	10–6–1	Koichiro Matsumoto	Decision (split)	Deep: 48 Impact	July 3, 2010	3	5:00	Tokyo, Japan	Lost the DEEP Featherweight Championship.
Loss	10–5–1	Kazuyuki Miyata	Decision (split)	Dream 14	May 29, 2010	3	5:00	Saitama, Saitama, Japan	
Win	10–4–1	Takeshi Yamazaki	Decision (unanimous)	Deep: 46 Impact	February 28, 2010	3	5:00	Tokyo, Japan	
Win	9–4–1	Dokonjonosuke Mishima	Decision (unanimous)	Deep: 43 Impact	August 23, 2009	3	5:00	Tokyo, Japan	Won the DEEP Featherweight Championship.
Loss	8–4–1	Bibiano Fernandes	Decision (unanimous)	Dream 7: Featherweight Grand Prix 2009 First Round	March 8, 2009	2	5:00	Saitama, Saitama, Japan	
Win	8–3–1	Shoji Maruyama	Decision (unanimous)	Deep: 39 Impact	December 10, 2008	3	5:00	Tokyo, Japan	
Win	7–3–1	Masanori Kanehara	Decision (split)	Deep: 38 Impact	October 23, 2008	2	5:00	Tokyo, Japan	
Loss	6–3–1	Rafael dos Anjos	Decision (split)	Fury FC 6: High Voltage	July 12, 2008	3	5:00	Rio de Janeiro, Brazil	
Win	6–2–1	Isamu Sugiuchi	TKO (slam and punches)	Deep: clubDeep Tokyo	May 24, 2008	1	3:51	Tokyo, Japan	
Win	5–2–1	Shun Takahashi	Submission (rear-naked choke)	Smoker's: The Smoker's Party 1	February 29, 2008	1	1:39	Tokyo, Japan	
Win	4–2–1	Rodrigo Ruiz	TKO (punches)	Fury FC 5: Final Conflict	December 6, 2007	2	3:12	São Paulo, Brazil	
Draw	3–2–1	Seiji Ozuka	Draw	Deep: 31 Impact	August 5, 2007	2	5:00	Tokyo, Japan	
Win	3–2	Motomare Takahashi	Submission (rear-naked choke)	Deep: clubDeep Tokyo	June 16, 2007	1	2:42	Tokyo, Japan	
Win	2–2	Leandro Issa	TKO (punches)	Fury FC 3: Reloaded	May 19, 2007	3	N/A	São Paulo, Brazil	
Win	1–2	Luiz Andrade I	Decision (unanimous)	MARS 6: Rapid Fire	December 22, 2006	2	5:00	Yokohama, Japan	
Loss	0–2	Toshiaki Kitada	Decision (unanimous)	Deep: clubDeep Tokyo: Future King Tournament 2006	December 9, 2006	1	5:00	Tokyo, Japan	
Loss	0–1	Tashiro Nishiuchi	Submission (rear-naked choke)	MARS: Bodog Fight	October 4, 2006	2	3:05	Tokyo, Japan	

== See also ==
- List of male mixed martial artists
