= Raoni Barcelos =

Brazilian mixed martial artist (born 1987)

- Born: Raoni Mendonca Barcelos; May 1, 1987 (age 39); Rio de Janeiro, Brazil
- Height: 5 ft 7 in (1.70 m)
- Weight: 135 lb (61 kg; 9 st 9 lb)
- Division: Bantamweight (2018–present); Featherweight (2012–2018)
- Reach: 67 in (170 cm)
- Style: Wrestling, Brazilian Jiu-Jitsu
- Fighting out of: Rio de Janeiro, Brazil
- Team: Laerte Barcelos Team; Rizzo RVT (2008–2022); Top Brother (2022–present)
- Rank: Black belt in Brazilian Jiu-Jitsu under Laerte Barcelos
- Years active: 2012–present

Mixed martial arts record
- Total: 28
- Wins: 22
- By knockout: 8
- By submission: 3
- By decision: 11
- Losses: 6
- By knockout: 2
- By submission: 1
- By decision: 3

Other information
- Mixed martial arts record from Sherdog

Raoni Mendonca Barcelos (born May 1, 1987) is a Brazilian professional mixed martial artist, former amateur wrestler and grappler. He currently competes in the Bantamweight division of the Ultimate Fighting Championship (UFC). Prior to signing with the UFC, Barcelos was a one-time Resurrection Fighting Alliance (RFA) featherweight champion, and a five-time Brazilian national wrestling champion. As of October 17, 2026, he is #15 in the Meta UFC bantamweight rankings.

== Background ==
Barcelos was born in Rio de Janeiro Brazil. He started grappling at the age of five under influence of his father, Laerte Barcelos, who was a Freestyle wrestler in the 1980s, competing for the Brazilian National Wrestling Team, as well as holding a 7th degree coral belt in jiu-jitsu. Barcelos won numerous major titles in his youth, including becoming 5-time national wrestling champion of Brazil, 2-time South-American wrestling champion, and winning 4 world titles in jiu-jitsu at the lower belt classes. After competing a few years for the Brazilian National Wrestling Team, Barcelos transitioned to mixed martial arts (MMA) in 2012 at the age of 25.

== Mixed martial arts career ==
=== Early career ===
Barcelos started fighting professionally in 2012. He fought under numerous organizations, notably Web Fight Combat, Shooto Brazil, and the Resurrection Fighting Alliance (RFA), where he was the former RFA featherweight champion.

=== Ultimate Fighting Championship ===
Bacelos was scheduled to make his debut at UFC on October 28, 2017, replacing injured Augusto Mendes. at UFC Fight Night 119 against Boston Salmon. Subsequently, Salmon pulled out of the fight on October 20 citing his own injury. As a result, Barcelos was removed from the card as well.

Barcelos's finally came on July 14, 2018, at UFC Fight Night 133, against Kurt Holobaugh. He won the fight via knockout. This fight earned him the Fight of the Night award.

His next fight came on November 30, 2018, at The Ultimate Fighter: Heavy Hitters against Chris Gutiérrez. He won the fight via technical submission.

Barcelos was scheduled to face Said Nurmagomedov on May 11, 2019, at UFC 237. However, Nurmagomedov withdrew from the bout for undisclosed reason and he was replaced by Carlos Huachin. He won the fight via knockout.

The bout with Nurmagomedov eventually took place on December 21, 2019, at UFC Fight Night 165. Barcelos won the fight via unanimous decision.

Barcelos was expected to face Cody Stamann on March 28, 2020, at UFC on ESPN: Ngannou vs. Rozenstruik. Due to the COVID-19 pandemic, the event was eventually postponed .

Barcelos faced Khalid Taha on November 7, 2020, at UFC on ESPN 17. He won the fight via unanimous decision. This fight earned him the Fight of the Night award.

Barcelos was expected to face Merab Dvalishvili on December 5, 2020, at UFC on ESPN 19. However, Barcelos was removed from the contest due to a medical suspension related to his latest bout on November 7.

Barcelos was scheduled to face Raphael Assunção on February 27, 2021, at UFC Fight Night 186. However, Assunção pulled out of the fight in early February for undisclosed reasons. UFC newcomer Marcelos Rojo was named as the replacement. Subsequently, Barcelos was removed from the fight on February 22 after testing positive for COVID-19.

Barcelos faced Timur Valiev on June 26, 2021, at UFC Fight Night 190. Despite knocking Valiev down several times, he lost the fight via majority decision. This fight earned him the Fight of the Night award.

Barcelos was scheduled to face Trevin Jones on December 18, 2021, at UFC Fight Night 199. However Jones withdrew from the fight for undisclosed reasons and he was replaced by Victor Henry. The pairing was then cancelled just hours before taking place due to COVID-19 protocols, and rescheduled to meet on January 22, 2022, at UFC 270. Barcelos lost the fight via unanimous decision.

Barcelos faced Trevin Jones on October 1, 2022, at UFC Fight Night 211. Barcelos won the fight by unanimous decision (30–25, 30–27, 30–27) in a one-sided fight.

Barcelos faced Umar Nurmagomedov on January 14, 2022, at UFC Fight Night 217. He lost the fight via knockout in the first round.

Barcelos was scheduled to face Miles Johns on June 17, 2023, at UFC on ESPN 47. However, Johns withdrew due to injury and the bout was scrapped.

Barcelos, as a replacement for Said Nurmagomedov, was rescheduled against Kyler Phillips on August 5, 2023 at UFC on ESPN 50. He lost the bout via unanimous decision.

Barcelos faced Cristian Quiñónez on February 24, 2024, at UFC Fight Night 237. He won the bout by rear-naked choke submission in the third round.

Barcelos faced undefeated prospect Payton Talbott on January 18, 2025 at UFC 311. He won the fight by unanimous decision.

Barcelos faced former UFC Bantamweight Champion Cody Garbrandt on June 14, 2025, at UFC on ESPN 69. He won the fight by unanimous decision.

Barcelos faced Ricky Simón on November 8, 2025 at UFC Fight Night 264. He won the fight by unanimous decision.

Barcelos faced Montel Jackson on April 25, 2026 at UFC Fight Night 274. He won the fight via split decision. 9 out of 10 media outlets scored the bout for Barcelos.

Barcelos faced Raul Rosas Jr. in the main event on September 26, 2026, at UFC Fight Night 289. In the fifth round, he lost the bout by a slam knockout and was stretchered out of the octagon after losing consciousness from the takedown. Despite losing, this fight earned him the Fight of the Night award.

== Championships and accomplishments ==
=== Mixed martial arts ===
- Ultimate Fighting Championship
  - Fight of the Night (Four times) vs. Kurt Holobaugh, Khalid Taha, Timur Valiev and Raul Rosas Jr.
  - Third most takedowns landed in UFC Bantamweight division history (39)
  - Tied (Rani Yahya) for second most submission attempts in UFC Bantamweight division history (14)
  - UFC.com Awards
    - 2018: Ranked #9 Newcomer of the Year
- Resurrection Fighting Alliance
  - RFA Featherweight Championship (One time; former)
    - Two successful title defenses
- Shooto Brazil
  - Shooto Brazil Featherweight Championship (one time; former)
- MMA Junkie
  - 2025 Upset of the Year vs. Payton Talbott at UFC 311
- theScore
  - 2025 Upset of the Year vs. Payton Talbott at UFC 311
- Cageside Press
  - 2025 Upset of the Year vs. Payton Talbott

=== Wrestling ===
- 5-time Brazilian Wrestling Champion
- 2-time South-American Wrestling Champion

=== Brazilian Jiu-Jitsu ===
Lineage: Mitsuyo Maeda > Carlos Gracie > Reyson Gracie > Osvaldo Alves > Laerte Barcelos > Raoni Barcelos

- Brazilian Nogi Champion (2009 black)
- World Champion – IBJJF (2002 blue, 2003 blue, 2006 purple)
- World Cup Champion – CBJJO (2005)
- Brazilian National Champion (2004 & 2005 blue, 2006 purple)
- Portuguese National Champion (2010)
- Brazilian National Silver Medallist (2002, 2003)

== Mixed martial arts record ==
Professional record breakdown
28 matches	22 wins	6 losses
By knockout	8	2
By submission	3	1
By decision	11	3

Res.	Record	Opponent	Method	Event	Date	Round	Time	Location	Notes
Loss	22–6	Raul Rosas Jr.	KO (slam)	UFC Fight Night: Rosas Jr. vs. Barcelos	26 September 2026	5	1:38	Las Vegas, Nevada, United States	Fight of the Night.
Win	22–5	Montel Jackson	Decision (split)	UFC Fight Night: Sterling vs. Zalal	25 April 2026	3	5:00	Las Vegas, Nevada, United States	
Win	21–5	Ricky Simón	Decision (unanimous)	UFC Fight Night: Bonfim vs. Brown	8 November 2025	3	5:00	Las Vegas, Nevada, United States	
Win	20–5	Cody Garbrandt	Decision (unanimous)	UFC on ESPN: Usman vs. Buckley	14 June 2025	3	5:00	Atlanta, Georgia, United States	
Win	19–5	Payton Talbott	Decision (unanimous)	UFC 311	18 January 2025	3	5:00	Inglewood, California, United States	
Win	18–5	Cristian Quiñónez	Submission (rear-naked choke)	UFC Fight Night: Moreno vs. Royval 2	24 February 2024	3	2:04	Mexico City, Mexico	
Loss	17–5	Kyler Phillips	Decision (unanimous)	UFC on ESPN: Sandhagen vs. Font	5 August 2023	3	5:00	Nashville, Tennessee, United States	
Loss	17–4	Umar Nurmagomedov	KO (body kick and punch)	UFC Fight Night: Strickland vs. Imavov	14 January 2023	1	4:40	Las Vegas, Nevada, United States	
Win	17–3	Trevin Jones	Decision (unanimous)	UFC Fight Night: Dern vs. Yan	1 October 2022	3	5:00	Las Vegas, Nevada, United States	
Loss	16–3	Victor Henry	Decision (unanimous)	UFC 270	22 January 2022	3	5:00	Anaheim, California, United States	
Loss	16–2	Timur Valiev	Decision (majority)	UFC Fight Night: Gane vs. Volkov	26 June 2021	3	5:00	Las Vegas, Nevada, United States	Fight of the Night.
Win	16–1	Khalid Taha	Decision (unanimous)	UFC on ESPN: Santos vs. Teixeira	7 November 2020	3	5:00	Las Vegas, Nevada, United States	Fight of the Night.
Win	15–1	Said Nurmagomedov	Decision (unanimous)	UFC Fight Night: Edgar vs. The Korean Zombie	21 December 2019	3	5:00	Busan, South Korea	
Win	14–1	Carlos Huachin	TKO (elbows and punches)	UFC 237	11 May 2019	2	4:49	Rio de Janeiro, Brazil	
Win	13–1	Chris Gutiérrez	Submission (rear-naked choke)	The Ultimate Fighter: Heavy Hitters Finale	30 November 2018	2	4:12	Las Vegas, Nevada, United States	Bantamweight debut.
Win	12–1	Kurt Holobaugh	KO (punches)	UFC Fight Night: dos Santos vs. Ivanov	14 July 2018	3	1:29	Boise, Idaho, United States	Fight of the Night.
Win	11–1	Dan Moret	KO (punches)	RFA 45	28 October 2016	2	0:51	Prior Lake, Minnesota, United States	Defended the RFA Featherweight Championship.
Win	10–1	Bobby Moffett	Decision (unanimous)	RFA 39	17 June 2016	5	5:00	Hammond, Indiana, United States	Defended the RFA Featherweight Championship.
Win	9–1	Ricky Musgrave	Decision (unanimous)	RFA 29	21 August 2015	5	5:00	Sioux Falls, South Dakota, United States	Won the vacant RFA Featherweight Championship.
Win	8–1	Jamal Parks	KO (punches)	RFA 23	6 February 2015	1	2:31	Costa Mesa, California, United States	
Loss	7–1	Mark Dickman	Submission (rear-naked choke)	RFA 14	11 April 2014	2	2:06	Cheyenne, Wyoming, United States	
Win	7–0	Tyler Toner	Decision (unanimous)	RFA 11	22 November 2013	3	5:00	Broomfield, Colorado, United States	
Win	6–0	Erinaldo dos Santos Rodrigues	KO (flying knee and punches)	Webfight Combat 2	7 July 2013	1	3:25	Rio de Janeiro, Brazil	
Win	5–0	João Herdy Jr.	TKO (punches)	Webfight Combat 1	27 January 2013	2	0:00	Rio de Janeiro, Brazil	
Win	4–0	Jorge Rodrigues Silva	Decision (unanimous)	Shooto Brazil 34	21 September 2012	3	5:00	Brasília, Brazil	Won the vacant Shooto Brazil Featherweight Championship.
Win	3–0	Fabricio Batista	TKO (punches)	Shooto Brazil 32	14 July 2012	1	0:21	Rio de Janeiro, Brazil	
Win	2–0	Gilmar Silva Milhorance	Submission (guillotine choke)	Shooto Brazil 29	26 April 2012	1	1:16	Rio de Janeiro, Brazil	
Win	1–0	Vitor Riso	TKO (doctor stoppage)	Shooto Brazil 28	10 March 2012	1	5:00	Rio de Janeiro, Brazil	

== See also ==
- List of current UFC fighters
- List of male mixed martial artists
