= Shintaro Ishiwatari =

Japanese martial artist

- Born: February 21, 1985 (age 41); Osaka, Osaka, Japan
- Native name: 石渡 伸太郎
- Nationality: Japanese
- Height: 5 ft 7 in (1.70 m)
- Weight: 134.5 lb (61.0 kg; 9.61 st)
- Division: Featherweight; Bantamweight
- Stance: Southpaw
- Fighting out of: Tokyo, Japan
- Team: CAVE
- Rank: Black belt in Judo
- Years active: 2006–2021

Mixed martial arts record
- Total: 39
- Wins: 26
- By knockout: 9
- By submission: 2
- By decision: 15
- Losses: 9
- By knockout: 5
- By submission: 1
- By decision: 3
- Draws: 4

Other information
- Mixed martial arts record from Sherdog

Shintaro Ishiwatari (Japanese: 石渡伸太郎, Ishiwatari Shintarō; born February 21, 1985) is a retired Japanese mixed martial artist and former Pancrase Bantamweight Champion. A professional competitor since 2006, he has also competed in Shooto, RIZIN, Vale Tudo Japan, DEEP, and World Victory Road.

== Mixed martial arts career ==
=== Shooto ===
Ishiwatari made his professional MMA debut for the Shooto organization in March 2006. He fought almost exclusively for this company for four years up to 2010 and - including a fight for World Victory Road - amassed a record of 7 wins, 3 losses and 3 draws during this time.

=== Pancrase ===
Ishiwatari debuted for the Pancrase organization in 2011. In that year he won the Bantamweight King of Pancrase and remains the champion today. As of October 2017, he has a record of 12 wins, 1 loss and 1 draw with the organization.

=== Rizin Fighting Federation ===
In 2017, Ishiwatari entered into the 2017 RIZIN Bantamweight Grand Prix. He faced Akhmed Musakaev in the first round on October 15, 2017, at Rizin World Grand Prix 2017: Opening Round - Part 2. He won the fight by unanimous decision to advance.

Ishiwatari competed in the rest of the Bantamweight Grand Prix in December 2017, fighting three times over two days. In the quarter-finals, he faced Kevin Petshi on December 29, 2017, at Rizin World Grand Prix 2017: 2nd Round. He won the fight via knockout in the first round. He advanced to the next round, which was held on December 31, 2017, at Rizin World Grand Prix 2017: Final Round. He faced Takafumi Otsuka in the semi-finals and won via unanimous decision. In the final, he faced Kyoji Horiguchi and lost via knockout early into the second round.

After the Grand Prix, Ishiwatari faced Ulka Sasaki at Rizin 17 on July 28, 2019. He won the fight via north–south choke in the second round.

Ishiwatari faced Hiromasa Ougikubo in a bout that served as a title eliminator at Rizin 20 on December 31, 2019. Ishiwatari lost the back-and-forth bout via split decision.

==== Rizin Bantamweight Grand Prix 2021 ====
Ishiwatari faced Naoki Inoue in the opening round of the Bantamweight Grand Prix at Rizin 28 on June 13, 2021. He lost the bout via soccer kick knockout in the first round.

After suffering the loss in the Grand Prix, Ishiwatari announced that he was retiring from MMA, mainly due to neck injuries.

== Championships and accomplishments ==
=== Mixed martial arts ===
- Pancrase
  - Bantamweight King of Pancrase (One time)
    - Five successful title defenses
- Rizin Fighting Federation
  - 2017 RIZIN Bantamweight Grand Prix Runner Up

== Mixed martial arts record ==
Professional record breakdown
39 matches	26 wins	9 losses
By knockout	9	5
By submission	2	1
By decision	15	3
Draws	4	

Res.	Record	Opponent	Method	Event	Date	Round	Time	Location	Notes
Loss	26–9–4	Naoki Inoue	KO (punches and soccer kick)	Rizin 28	June 13, 2021	1	2:01	Tokyo, Japan	2021 Rizin Bantamweight Grand Prix Opening round.
Loss	26–8–4	Hiromasa Ougikubo	Decision (split)	Rizin 20	December 31, 2019	3	5:00	Saitama, Japan	Rizin Bantamweight title eliminator.
Win	26–7–4	Ulka Sasaki	Submission (north-south choke)	Rizin 17	July 28, 2019	2	3:58	Saitama, Japan	
Loss	25–7–4	Kyoji Horiguchi	KO (punches)	Rizin World Grand Prix 2017: Final Round	December 31, 2017	2	0:14	Saitama, Japan	2017 Rizin Bantamweight Grand Prix Final.
Win	25–6–4	Takafumi Otsuka	Decision (unanimous)	Rizin World Grand Prix 2017: Final Round	December 31, 2017	3	5:00	Saitama, Japan	2017 Rizin Bantamweight Grand Prix Semifinal.
Win	24–6–4	Kevin Petshi	KO (punch)	Rizin World Grand Prix 2017: 2nd Round	December 29, 2017	1	4:31	Saitama, Japan	2017 Rizin Bantamweight Grand Prix Quarterfinal.
Win	23–6–4	Akhmed Musakaev	Decision (unanimous)	Rizin World Grand Prix 2017: Opening Round - Part 2	October 15, 2017	3	5:00	Fukuoka, Japan	2017 Rizin Bantamweight Grand Prix Opening round.
Win	22–6–4	Rafael Silva	Decision (unanimous)	Pancrase 287	May 28, 2017	3	5:00	Tokyo, Japan	Defended the Pancrase Bantamweight Championship.
Win	21–6–4	Jonathan Brookins	Decision (unanimous)	Pancrase 279	July 24, 2016	3	5:00	Tokyo, Japan	Defended the Pancrase Bantamweight Championship.
Win	20–6–4	Victor Henry	Decision (unanimous)	Pancrase 273	December 13, 2015	5	5:00	Tokyo, Japan	Defended the Pancrase Bantamweight Championship.
Win	19–6–4	Takafumi Otsuka	TKO (corner stoppage)	DEEP: DREAM Impact 2014: Omisoka Special	December 31, 2014	1	3:30	Saitama, Japan	
Loss	18–6–4	Jonathan Brookins	Decision (unanimous)	Pancrase 262	November 1, 2014	3	5:00	Tokyo, Japan	Non-title bout.
Win	18–5–4	Trevor Ward	TKO (corner stoppage)	Pancrase 258	May 11, 2014	1	5:00	Tokyo, Japan	Defended the Pancrase Bantamweight Championship.
Win	17–5–4	Yo Saito	Decision (unanimous)	Pancrase 256	February 2, 2014	3	5:00	Tokyo, Japan	Defended the Pancrase Bantamweight Championship.
Win	16–5–4	Alan Yoshihiro Yamaniwa	Decision (majority)	Pancrase 255	December 8, 2013	3	5:00	Tokyo, Japan	Non-title bout.
Loss	15–5–4	Kyoji Horiguchi	TKO (head kicks and punches)	Vale Tudo Japan: VTJ 2nd	June 22, 2013	5	0:41	Tokyo, Japan	
Win	15–4–4	Nobuhiro Yoshitake	KO (soccer kick)	Pancrase 246	March 17, 2013	1	3:36	Tokyo, Japan	Non-title bout.
Win	14–4–4	Caol Uno	Decision (unanimous)	Shooto: 10th Round	September 30, 2012	3	5:00	Tokyo, Japan	
Win	13–4–4	Nobutaka Hiyoshi	Decision (unanimous)	Pancrase: Progress Tour 7	June 1, 2012	2	5:00	Tokyo, Japan	Non-title bout.
Win	12–4–4	Manabu Inoue	Decision (majority)	Pancrase: Impressive Tour 13	December 3, 2011	3	5:00	Tokyo, Japan	Won the Pancrase Bantamweight Championship.
Win	11–4–4	Motonobu Tezuka	Decision (split)	Pancrase: Impressive Tour 8	August 7, 2011	3	5:00	Tokyo, Japan	Pancrase Bantamweight title eliminator.
Draw	10–4–4	Tashiro Nishiuchi	Draw (split)	Pancrase: Impressive Tour 4	May 3, 2011	3	5:00	Tokyo, Japan	
Win	10–4–3	Tashiro Nishiuchi	Decision (unanimous)	Pancrase: Impressive Tour 3	March 11, 2011	3	5:00	Tokyo, Japan	
Loss	9–4–3	Taiyo Nakahara	Decision (split)	World Victory Road Presents: Sengoku Raiden Championships 15	October 30, 2010	2	5:00	Tokyo, Japan	2010 SRC Asia Bantamweight Tournament Quarterfinals.
Win	9–3–3	Lee Kil-woo	Submission (guillotine choke)	Sengoku Raiden Championship 14	August 7, 2010	1	2:20	Tokyo, Japan	2010 SRC Asia Bantamweight Tournament Second Round.
Win	8–3–3	Nobuhiro Yamauchi	TKO (punches)	SRC ASIA vol.1	July 7, 2010	1	3:13	Tokyo, Japan	Bantamweight debut. 2010 SRC Asia Bantamweight Tournament First round.
Win	7–3–3	Wataru Miki	Decision (majority)	Shooto: The Way of Shooto 3: Like a Tiger, Like a Dragon	May 30, 2010	2	5:00	Tokyo, Japan	
Loss	6–3–3	Taiki Tsuchiya	KO (punches)	Shooto: Shooting Disco 9: Superman	June 6, 2009	1	0:20	Tokyo, Japan	
Loss	6–2–3	Jung Chan-sung	Submission (rear-naked choke)	World Victory Road Presents: Sengoku 7	March 20, 2009	1	4:29	Tokyo, Japan	2009 Sengoku Featherweight Grand Prix First round.
Draw	6–1–3	Michihiro Omigawa	Draw (unanimous)	Shooto: Shooto Tradition 5	January 18, 2009	2	5:00	Tokyo, Japan	
Win	6–1–2	Tenkei Oda	TKO (punches)	Shooto: Shooto Tradition 3	September 28, 2008	1	4:08	Tokyo, Japan	
Win	5–1–2	Kazuhiro Ito	KO (slam)	Shooto: Shooting Disco 4: Born in the Fighting	February 23, 2008	1	2:17	Tokyo, Japan	
Win	4–1–2	Hayate Usui	Decision (unanimous)	Shooto: Back To Our Roots 6	November 8, 2007	2	5:00	Tokyo, Japan	
Draw	3–1–2	Hiroshi Nakamura	Draw (majority)	Shooto: Shooting Disco 2: The Heat Rises Tonight	August 5, 2007	2	5:00	Tokyo, Japan	
Win	3–1–1	Toshihiko Yokoyama	TKO (punches)	Shooto: Shooting Disco 1: Saturday Night Hero	June 2, 2007	1	2:45	Tokyo, Japan	
Win	2–1–1	Tomonori Taniguchi	TKO (doctor stoppage)	Shooto: It's Strong Being a Man	March 4, 2007	1	3:41	Tokyo, Japan	
Win	1–1–1	Masatoshi Kobayashi	Decision (majority)	Shooto: 11/10 in Korakuen Hall	November 10, 2006	2	5:00	Tokyo, Japan	
Draw	0–1–1	Keisuke Yamada	Draw (unanimous)	Shooto 2006: 10/1 in Kitazawa Town Hall	October 1, 2006	2	5:00	Tokyo, Japan	
Loss	0–1	Daisuke Ishizawa	TKO (doctor stoppage)	Shooto: 3/3 in Kitazawa Town Hall	March 3, 2006	2	2:01	Tokyo, Japan	

== See also ==
- List of male mixed martial artists
