= Khalid Taha =

German MMA fighter

- Born: February 15, 1992 (age 34); Warendorf, Germany
- Other names: The Warrior
- Nationality: German
- Height: 5 ft 7 in (1.70 m)
- Weight: 135 lb (61 kg; 9 st 9 lb)
- Division: Lightweight; Featherweight; Bantamweight
- Reach: 69 in (175 cm)
- Fighting out of: Warendorf, Germany
- Team: Arena Dortmund
- Rank: Green belt in Taekwondo
- Years active: 2013–present

Mixed martial arts record
- Total: 23
- Wins: 16
- By knockout: 12
- By submission: 2
- By decision: 2
- Losses: 6
- By knockout: 2
- By submission: 1
- By decision: 3
- No contests: 1

Other information
- Mixed martial arts record from Sherdog

Khalid Taha (born February 15, 1992) is a German mixed martial artist currently competing in the bantamweight division of the Oktagon MMA. A professional since 2013, he has fought in the Ultimate Fighting Championship and Rizin Fighting Federation.

== Mixed martial arts career ==
=== Early career ===
Taha started fighting MMA professionally in 2013. He has fought under numerous organizations, notably German MMA Championship, Fair Fighting Championship and Rizin Fighting Federation.

=== Ultimate Fighting Championship ===
Taha made his UFC debut on July 22, 2018, at UFC Fight Night: Shogun vs. Smith against Nad Narimani. He lost the fight via unanimous decision.

Taha was scheduled to face Boston Salmon on November 30, 2018, at The Ultimate Fighter: Heavy Hitters Finale. However, Taha was pulled from the event due to a torn ACL and the bout was cancelled. The pairing was rescheduled at UFC 236 on April 13, 2019. He won the fight via technical knockout in round one.

Taha was scheduled to face Bruno Gustavo da Silva on September 7, 2019, at UFC 242. However, on August 21, it was reported that the bout was moved to UFC 243. Taha won the fight via a submission in round three. On December 23, 2019, Taha received one year USADA suspension for tested positive for furosemide (diuretics) in an in-competition urine sample provided on Oct. 6 2019 where Taha took a medicine for reducing inflammation and swelling in his eyes which contained furosemide. He became eligible to compete again on October 6, 2020.

Taha was expected to face Jack Shore on November 7, 2020, at UFC on ESPN: Santos vs. Teixeira. However, Shore was removed from the bout in late-October due to undisclosed reasons and replaced by Raoni Barcelos. Taha lost the fight via unanimous decision. This fight earned him the Fight of the Night award.

Taha faced Sergey Morozov on July 17, 2021, at UFC on ESPN 26. He lost the fight via unanimous decision.

Taha was scheduled to face Mario Bautista on February 19, 2022, at UFC Fight Night 201. However, Taha had to pull out off the bout due to undisclosed reasons.

Taha was scheduled to face Taylor Lapilus on September 3, 2022, at UFC Fight Night 209.; but on August 23, Lapilus forfeited from the event due to a broken hand, and he was replaced by Cristian Quiñónez. He lost the fight via technical knockout in round one.

After the loss, it was announced that Taha was no longer on the UFC roster.

=== Oktagon MMA ===
After this win at the Germany promotion National Fighting Championship, Taha made his Oktagon debut against Jose Zarauz on April 5, 2025, at Oktagon 69. He won the fight via technical knockout in round two.

Taha was scheduled to face Max Holzer in the main event on September 13, 2025, at Oktagon 75. However on August 30, Holzer withdrew from the event due to health issues and was replaced by Édgar Delgado Jimenez. He won the fight via knockout in round three.

== Championships and accomplishments ==
=== Mixed martial arts ===
- Ultimate Fighting Championship
  - Fight of the Night (One time) vs. Raoni Barcelos

== Personal life ==
Taha is of Lebanese descent.

== Mixed martial arts record ==
Professional record breakdown
23 matches	16 wins	6 losses
By knockout	12	2
By submission	2	1
By decision	2	3
No contests	1	

Res.	Record	Opponent	Method	Event	Date	Round	Time	Location	Notes
Loss	16–6 (1)	Max Holzer	TKO (knee to the body and punches)	Oktagon 88	May 16, 2026	1	3:14	Hanover, Germany	
Win	16–5 (1)	Édgar Delgado Jimenez	KO (punches)	Oktagon 75	September 13, 2025	3	0:38	Hanover, Germany	Performance of the Night.
Win	15–5 (1)	Jose Zarauz	TKO (punches and elbows)	Oktagon 69	April 5, 2025	2	4:04	Dortmund, Germany	Catchweight (150.4 lb) bout; Zarauz missed weight.
Win	14–5 (1)	William Valentim	TKO (punches)	National FC 13	March 25, 2023	1	2:26	Dortmund, Germany	Return to Featherweight.
Loss	13–5 (1)	Cristian Quiñónez	TKO (punches)	UFC Fight Night: Gane vs. Tuivasa	September 3, 2022	1	3:15	Paris, France	
Loss	13–4 (1)	Sergey Morozov	Decision (unanimous)	UFC on ESPN: Makhachev vs. Moisés	July 17, 2021	3	5:00	Las Vegas, Nevada, United States	
Loss	13–3 (1)	Raoni Barcelos	Decision (unanimous)	UFC on ESPN: Santos vs. Teixeira	November 7, 2020	3	5:00	Las Vegas, Nevada, United States	Fight of the Night.
NC	13–2 (1)	Bruno Gustavo da Silva	NC (overturned)	UFC 243	October 6, 2019	3	3:00	Melbourne, Australia	Catchweight (137 lb) bout; Taha missed weight. Originally a submission (arm-triangle choke) win for Taha; overturned after he tested positive for furosemide.
Win	13–2	Boston Salmon	TKO (punches)	UFC 236	April 13, 2019	1	0:25	Atlanta, Georgia, United States	Return to Bantamweight.
Loss	12–2	Nad Narimani	Decision (unanimous)	UFC Fight Night: Shogun vs. Smith	July 22, 2018	3	5:00	Hamburg, Germany	
Win	12–1	Hamza Kooheji	Submission (rear-naked choke)	Brave CF 12	May 11, 2017	2	N/A	Jakarta, Indonesia	Return to Featherweight.
Loss	11–1	Takafumi Otsuka	Submission (guillotine choke)	Rizin World Grand Prix 2017: 2nd Round	December 29, 2017	3	3:23	Saitama, Japan	2017 Rizin Bantamweight Grand Prix Quarterfinal.
Win	11–0	Keita Ishibashi	KO (knees and punches)	Rizin World Grand Prix 2017: Opening Round - Part 1	July 30, 2017	1	4:52	Saitama, Japan	2017 Rizin Bantamweight Grand Prix First Round.
Win	10–0	Timo-Juhani Hirvikangas	Decision (split)	GMC 9	November 19, 2016	3	5:00	Castrop-Rauxel, Germany	
Win	9–0	Michail Chrisopoulos	KO (punch)	Fair FC 5	November 19, 2016	1	1:20	Eindhoven, Netherlands	
Win	8–0	Nijat Valujev	TKO (punches)	Fair FC: Top Ten Champions	March 12, 2016	1	2:26	Herne, Germany	
Win	7–0	Daniel Makin	TKO (punches)	Fair FC 4	November 28, 2015	1	2:20	Eindhoven, Netherlands	
Win	6–0	Omer Cankardesler	Decision (unanimous)	Fair FC 3	March 28, 2015	3	5:00	Rheinberg, Germany	Won the Fair FC Bantamweight Championship.
Win	5–0	Ali Selcuk Ayin	TKO (submission to punches)	GMC 5	September 13, 2014	1	4:59	Herne, Germany	
Win	4–0	Manuel Bilić	Submission (rear-naked choke)	Fair FC 1	February 8, 2014	2	4:24	Herne, Germany	Bantamweight debut.
Win	3–0	Florin Gârdan	TKO (knees)	RNC: Martial Arts Gala	November 30, 2013	2	4:43	Frankenthal, Germany	Featherweight debut.
Win	2–0	John Isac	TKO (punches)	GMC 4	July 6, 2013	2	0:20	Herne, Germany	
Win	1–0	Muhammed Celebi	TKO (punches)	MMA Bundesliga 2	April 6, 2013	2	2:43	Herne, Germany	Lightweight debut.

== See also ==
- List of male mixed martial artists
