= UFC on ESPN: Santos vs. Teixeira =

UFC mixed martial arts event in 2020

- The poster for UFC on ESPN: Santos vs. Teixeira
- Promotion: Ultimate Fighting Championship
- Date: November 7, 2020
- Venue: UFC Apex
- City: Enterprise, Nevada, United States
- Attendance: None (behind closed doors)

Event chronology
UFC Fight Night: Hall vs. Silva	UFC on ESPN: Santos vs. Teixeira	UFC Fight Night: Felder vs. dos Anjos

UFC on ESPN: Santos vs. Teixeira (also known as UFC on ESPN 17 and UFC Vegas 13) was a mixed martial arts event produced by the Ultimate Fighting Championship that took place on November 7, 2020 at the UFC Apex facility in Enterprise, Nevada, part of the Las Vegas Metropolitan Area, United States.

== Background ==
A light heavyweight bout between former UFC Light Heavyweight Championship challengers Thiago Santos and Glover Teixeira headlined this event. They were initially scheduled to headline UFC Fight Night: Waterson vs. Hill. However, the pairing was rescheduled for UFC on ESPN: Holm vs. Aldana after Teixeira tested positive for COVID-19 a week prior to the fight. On September 15, the bout was postponed again as Santos tested positive for the disease.

A middleweight bout between Ian Heinisch and Brendan Allen was previously scheduled to take place earlier this year at UFC on ESPN: Poirier vs. Hooker. However, Heinisch pulled out due to injury and the matchup was scrapped. The pairing was rescheduled and expected to take place at this event. On the day of the event, the UFC announced the bout was once again cancelled due to a positive COVID-19 test involving Heinisch.

A strawweight bout between former UFC Women's Strawweight Championship challenger Cláudia Gadelha and Yan Xiaonan was expected to take place at UFC 253, but a knee injury sustained by Gadelha ruled her out of the bout. The pairing was rescheduled for this event instead.

A lightweight bout between Carlos Diego Ferreira and Drew Dober was initially scheduled to take place in May at UFC Fight Night: Hermansson vs. Weidman. However, the event was cancelled due to the COVID-19 pandemic. The pairing was then rescheduled for this event. In turn, Ferreira pulled out on October 22 due to an illness and the bout was scrapped.

A heavyweight bout between former UFC Heavyweight Champion Andrei Arlovski and Tanner Boser was briefly scheduled for UFC on ESPN: Holm vs. Aldana, but was later moved to this event due to Arlovski being ill.

A heavyweight bout between Marcos Rogério de Lima and Alexander Romanov was initially scheduled to take place a month earlier at UFC Fight Night: Overeem vs. Sakai. However, Lima pulled out after testing positive for COVID-19. The pairing took place at this event.

Philipe Lins was expected to face Don'Tale Mayes in a heavyweight bout at the event. However, it was announced on October 14 that Lins had a knee injury and pulled out of the event. Mayes was then expected to face Roque Martinez a week later at UFC Fight Night: Felder vs. dos Anjos.

A featherweight bout between Jeremy Stephens and Arnold Allen was scheduled to take place at the event. However, Stephens was forced to withdraw from the event in late October citing injury. A replacement could not be found and Allen was also removed.

A bantamweight bout between Khalid Taha and Jack Shore was expected to take place at the event. However, Shore was removed from the bout in late October due to undisclosed reasons and replaced by Raoni Barcelos.

Felipe Colares pulled out of a scheduled bantamweight bout against Gustavo Lopez during fight week as he tested positive for COVID-19. He was replaced by returning veteran Anthony Birchak.

Another bout affected by the COVID-19 pandemic was a bantamweight contest between Sarah Moras and Vanessa Melo, as Moras tested positive for the disease and the pairing was postponed to take place at UFC on ABC: Holloway vs. Kattar.

== Results ==
Main card (ESPN2 / ESPN+)
Weight class				Method	Round	Time	Notes
Light Heavyweight	Glover Teixeira	def.	Thiago Santos	Submission (rear-naked choke)	3	1:49
Heavyweight	Andrei Arlovski	def.	Tanner Boser	Decision (unanimous) (29–28, 29–28, 29–28)	3	5:00
Bantamweight	Raoni Barcelos	def.	Khalid Taha	Decision (unanimous) (30–27, 30–27, 30–27)	3	5:00
Featherweight	Giga Chikadze	def.	Jamey Simmons	TKO (head kick and punches)	1	3:51
Women's Strawweight	Yan Xiaonan	def.	Cláudia Gadelha	Decision (unanimous) (29–28, 29–28, 29–28)	3	5:00
Preliminary card (ESPN+)
Middleweight	Trevin Giles	def.	Bevon Lewis	TKO (punches)	3	1:26
Heavyweight	Alexander Romanov	def.	Marcos Rogério de Lima	Technical Submission (forearm choke)	1	4:48
Featherweight	Darren Elkins	def.	Luiz Eduardo Garagorri	Submission (rear-naked choke)	3	2:22
Welterweight	Max Griffin	def.	Ramiz Brahimaj	TKO (doctor stoppage)	3	2:03
Bantamweight	Gustavo Lopez	def.	Anthony Birchak	Submission (rear-naked choke)	1	2:43

== Bonus awards ==
The following fighters received $50,000 bonuses.

- Fight of the Night: Raoni Barcelos vs. Khalid Taha
- Performance of the Night: Giga Chikadze and Alexandr Romanov

== See also ==
- List of UFC events
- List of current UFC fighters
- 2020 in UFC
