= Anthony Birchak =

American mixed martial arts fighter

- Born: May 16, 1986 (age 40); Tucson, Arizona, U.S.
- Other names: El Toro
- Height: 5 ft 8 in (1.73 m)
- Weight: 145.1 lb (65.8 kg; 10.36 st)
- Division: Bantamweight; Featherweight
- Reach: 69.0 in (175 cm)
- Fighting out of: Tucson, Arizona, U.S.
- Team: Torotech MMA; Luta Elite Mma
- Rank: Black belt in Brazilian Jiu-Jitsu under Casey Halstead
- Wrestling: NCAA Division II Wrestling
- Years active: 2009–present

Mixed martial arts record
- Total: 24
- Wins: 16
- By knockout: 5
- By submission: 8
- By decision: 3
- Losses: 8
- By knockout: 2
- By submission: 3
- By decision: 3

Other information
- Mixed martial arts record from Sherdog

Anthony Birchak (born May 16, 1986) is an American mixed martial artist who competes in the Bantamweight division. A professional competitor since 2009. he formerly competed for the Ultimate Fighting Championship (UFC), Legacy Fighting Alliance, Bellator, Rizin and the MFC.

== Background ==
Birchak is Mexican American and was born and raised in Tucson, Arizona. Birchak was a highly decorated amateur wrestler at Sahuarita High School. Birchak attended Pima Community College and Grand Canyon University where he majored in Visual Communications. His wife Mercedes White acts as his manager. Together they have launched a mixed martial arts school TOROTech MMA.

== Mixed martial arts career ==
=== Early career ===
Birchak made his professional mixed martial arts debut in 2009 competing primarily in regional promotions across the Southwestern United States, before making an appearance at Bellator 41 where he earned a submission victory over Tyler Bialecki. After seven more fights and two titles later on the regional and Canadian circuit, where he compiled a record of 11–1, Birchak signed with the UFC in the summer of 2014.

=== Ultimate Fighting Championship ===
Birchak was expected to make his promotional debut against Joe Soto on August 30, 2014, at UFC 177. However, on the day of the weigh-ins, event headliner Renan Barão had to be admitted to the hospital as a result of his attempts to cut weight. Soto was tabbed as his replacement against T.J. Dillashaw. Subsequently, Birchak was removed from the card entirely.

Birchak faced Ian Entwistle on December 13, 2014, at UFC on Fox 13. Birchak lost the bout via submission in the first round.

A rescheduled bout with Joe Soto took place on June 6, 2015, at UFC Fight Night 68. Birchak won the fight via knockout in the first round.

Birchak next faced Thomas Almeida on November 7, 2015, at UFC Fight Night 77. He lost the fight via knockout in the first round.

Birchak next faced Dileno Lopes on July 7, 2016, at UFC Fight Night 90. He won the fight via split decision.

Despite winning his last fight, Birchak never received a new contract offer from the UFC and was released from the promotion in February 2017.

=== Post-UFC career ===
==== Rizin FF ====
Birchak quickly signed with Rizin Fighting Federation after his UFC release. He made his debut against Tatsuya Kawajiri on April 16, 2017, at Rizin FF 5. He lost the bout via unanimous decision.

Birchak next faced Takafumi Otsuka in the first round of the Rizin Bantamweight Grand Prix on July 30, 2017, at Rizin 6. He lost the fight via split decision.

==== Combate Americas ====
Birchak faced Adam Martinez at Combate Americas Mexico vs. USA on October 13, 2018. He won the fight via TKO only 51 seconds into the fight.

==== LFA ====
Birchak was expected to headline LFA 72 against Nohelin Hernandez on July 26, 2019. However, Hernandez stepped in to replace Sean O'Malley at UFC 239 and was replaced by Raphael Montini de Lima. Birchak won the fight in the first round via submission.

==== Combate Americas ====
After the victory in the LFA, Birchak was expected to face Erik Aguilar Radleim at Combate Americas' event on October 11, 2019. However, Radleim pulled out due to visa issues and was replaced by Jose Luis Calvo.

==== Return to UFC ====
Birchak faced Gustavo Lopez, replacing Felipe Colares, on November 7, 2020, at UFC on ESPN: Santos vs. Teixeira. He lost the fight via a submission in round one.

Birchak was scheduled to face Johnny Eduardo on March 20, 2021, at UFC on ESPN 21. However, on March 15 Eduardo withdrew from the bout due to visa issues. It is unclear if a replacement would be sought by the promotion.

Birchak faced off against Tony Gravely, replacing Nate Maness on April 17, 2021, at UFC on ESPN 22. He lost the fight via TKO in the second round.

After the loss he was released by the UFC.

== Championships and accomplishments ==
- Maximum Fighting Championship
  - MFC Bantamweight Championship (One time)

== Mixed martial arts record ==
Professional record breakdown
| 22 matches | 14 wins | 8 losses |
| By knockout | 5 | 2 |
| By submission | 6 | 3 |
| By decision | 3 | 3 |

| Res. | Record | Opponent | Method | Event | Date | Round | Time | Location | Notes |
|---|---|---|---|---|---|---|---|---|---|
| | | Dumar Roa | | Combat FC 7 | July 11, 2026 | | | El Paso, Texas, United States | Lightweight debut. |
| Loss | 16–8 | Tony Gravely | TKO (punch) | UFC on ESPN: Whittaker vs. Gastelum | April 17, 2021 | 2 | 1:31 | Las Vegas, Nevada, United States | |
| Loss | 16–7 | Gustavo Lopez | Submission (rear-naked choke) | UFC on ESPN: Santos vs. Teixeira | November 7, 2020 | 1 | 2:43 | Las Vegas, Nevada, United States | |
| Win | 16–6 | Erik Radleim | Submission (rear-naked choke) | Combate Americas: Tucson | Oct 11, 2019 | 1 | 1:40 | Tucson, Arizona, United States | |
| Win | 15–6 | Raphael Montini de Lima | Submission (rear-naked choke) | LFA 72 | July 26, 2019 | 1 | 1:34 | Phoenix, Arizona, United States | |
| Win | 14–6 | Adam Martinez | TKO (punches) | Combate 26 | October 13, 2018 | 1 | 0:51 | Tucson, Arizona, United States | |
| Loss | 13–6 | Moon Jae-hoon | Decision (split) | Rizin World Grand Prix 2017: 2nd Round | December 29, 2017 | 3 | 5:00 | Saitama, Japan | 2017 Rizin Bantamweight Grand Prix Reserve bout. |
| Loss | 13–5 | Takafumi Otsuka | Decision (split) | Rizin World Grand Prix 2017: Opening Round - Part 1 | July 30, 2017 | 2 | 5:00 | Saitama, Japan | Return to Bantamweight. 2017 Rizin Bantamweight Grand Prix Round of 16. |
| Loss | 13–4 | Tatsuya Kawajiri | Decision (unanimous) | Rizin 2017 in Yokohama: Sakura | April 16, 2017 | 2 | 5:00 | Yokohama, Japan | Featherweight debut. |
| Win | 13–3 | Dileno Lopes | Decision (split) | UFC Fight Night: dos Anjos vs. Alvarez | July 7, 2016 | 3 | 5:00 | Las Vegas, Nevada, United States | |
| Loss | 12–3 | Thomas Almeida | KO (punch) | UFC Fight Night: Belfort vs. Henderson 3 | November 7, 2015 | 1 | 4:22 | São Paulo, Brazil | |
| Win | 12–2 | Joe Soto | KO (punches) | UFC Fight Night: Boetsch vs. Henderson | June 6, 2015 | 1 | 1:37 | New Orleans, Louisiana, United States | |
| Loss | 11–2 | Ian Entwistle | Submission (heel hook) | UFC on Fox: dos Santos vs. Miocic | December 13, 2014 | 1 | 1:04 | Phoenix, Arizona, United States | |
| Win | 11–1 | Tito Jones | Submission (rear-naked choke) | Maximum FC 38 | October 4, 2013 | 2 | 3:30 | Edmonton, Alberta, Canada | Won the MFC Bantamweight Championship. |
| Win | 10–1 | Ryan Benoit | Decision (unanimous) | Maximum FC 37 | May 10, 2013 | 3 | 5:00 | Edmonton, Alberta, Canada | |
| Win | 9–1 | Matt Leyva | TKO (punches) | Jackson's MMA Series 10 | December 1, 2012 | 1 | 1:22 | Albuquerque, New Mexico, United States | |
| Win | 8–1 | Roman Salazar | TKO (punches) | Coalition of Combat: Clash of the Titans | June 2, 2012 | 3 | 1:38 | Phoenix, Arizona, United States | |
| Win | 7–1 | John Green | TKO (punches) | Xtreme Combat Promotions: Burlington Beatdown | April 28, 2012 | 2 | 2:14 | Winooski, Vermont, United States | |
| Loss | 6–1 | Jorge Clay | Submission (rear-naked choke) | Amazon Forest Combat 1 | September 14, 2011 | 1 | 1:29 | Manaus, Brazil | |
| Win | 6–0 | Carlos Ortega | Decision (unanimous) | Rage in the Cage 153 | July 16, 2011 | 3 | 3:00 | Chandler, Arizona, United States | |
| Win | 5–0 | Tyler Bialecki | Submission (brabo choke) | Bellator 41 | April 16, 2011 | 1 | 4:06 | Atlantic City, New Jersey, United States | |
| Win | 4–0 | Austin Apollos | Submission (arm-triangle choke) | Rage in the Cage 150 | March 19, 2011 | 1 | 2:36 | Chandler, Arizona, United States | |
| Win | 3–0 | Matt Betzold | Submission (triangle choke) | World Fighting Federation | October 16, 2010 | 2 | 1:12 | Tucson, Arizona, United States | |
| Win | 2–0 | Gio Arvizu | Submission (armbar) | World Fighting Federation | April 24, 2010 | 1 | 1:30 | Tucson, Arizona, United States | |
| Win | 1–0 | Michael Poe | Submission (choke) | Ringside Ultimo Fighting | July 4, 2009 | 1 | 1:18 | Nogales, Arizona, United States | Bantamweight debut. |

== See also ==
- List of male mixed martial artists
