= 2017 in Rizin Fighting Federation =

Rizin Fighting Federation in 2017

Information
- First date: April 16, 2017
- Last date: December 31, 2017

Events
- Total events: 5

Fights

Chronology
2016 in Rizin Fighting Federation	2017 in Rizin Fighting Federation	2018 in Rizin Fighting Federation

The year 2017 was the third year in the history of the Rizin Fighting Federation, a mixed martial arts promotion based in Japan. The year began with Rizin 2017 in Yokohama: Sakura on April 16, 2017.

Rizin events are broadcast through a television agreement with Fuji Television. In North America and Europe, Rizin events became available on FITE TV.

== Background ==
Nobuyuki Sakakibara announced that Rizin will do 5 events in 2017: April, July, October, and the usual December 29 and 31 show.

He also announced that they will do 2 Grand Prix this year. One is men, other is women. He stated the women grand prix will be at Atomweight due to the fact Rena Kubota will be in the grand prix. Kyoji Horiguchi will compete in the men tournament which take place at Bantamweight 61 kg.

Rizin's Bantamweight grand prix will begin on July 30 at the Saitama Super Arena, with the first four opening rounds bouts of the tournament bracket. The remaining four opening bouts will take place in the autumn. Similar to the last year GP, the quarterfinals are scheduled for Dec. 29. The semifinals and finals will be held on the same night, Dec. 31, at Saitama Super Arena.

=== 16-Man bantamweight 61 kg GP participants ===
- (Japan) Kyoji Horiguchi
- (Japan) Hideo Tokoro
- (Japan) Erson Yamamoto
- (Japan) Takafumi Otsuka
- (Japan) Keita Ishibashi
- (Germany) Khalid Taha
- (United States) Anthony Birchak
- (Japan) Shintaro Ishiwatari
- (Portugal) Manel Kape
- (Russia) Akhmed Musakaev
- (South Korea) Jae Hoon Moon
- (France) Kevin Petshi
- (United States) Ian McCall
- (Brazil) Gabriel Oliviera

=== 8-female super atomweight 49 kg GP participants ===
- (Japan) Rena Kubota
- (Japan) Kanna Asakura
- (United States) Andy Nguyen
- (Japan) Miyuu Yamamoto
- (Brazil) Maria Oliveira
- (Poland) Sylwia Juśkiewicz
- (United States) Alyssa Garcia
- (Spain) Irene Cabello Rivera

== List of events ==
#	Event	Date	Venue	Location	Attendance
1	Rizin 2017 in Yokohama: Sakura	April 16, 2017	Yokohama Arena	Yokohama, Japan	12,729
2	Rizin World Grand Prix 2017: opening round part 1	July 30, 2017	Saitama Super Arena	Saitama, Japan	17,730
3	Rizin World Grand Prix 2017: opening round part 2	October 15, 2017	Marine Messe Fukuoka	Fukuoka, Japan	7,732
4	Rizin World Grand Prix 2017: 2nd round	December 29, 2017	Saitama Super Arena	Saitama, Japan	15,539
5	Rizin World Grand Prix 2017: final round	December 31, 2017	Saitama Super Arena	Saitama, Japan	18,316

== Rizin Bantamweight Grand Prix 2017 bracket ==
1st Round; Rizin WGP opening round part 1 & part 2
(United States) Ian McCall
BYE
(Japan) Erson Yamamoto	1:10
(Portugal) Manel Kape	TKO
(Japan) Kyoji Horiguchi	KO
(Japan) Hideo Tokoro	1:49
(Brazil) Gabriel Oliviera
BYE
(Japan) Keita Ishibashi	4:51
(Germany) Khalid Taha	KO
(Japan) Takafumi Otsuka	DEC
(United States) Anthony Birchak	15:00
(South Korea) Jae Hoon Moon	15:00
(France) Kevin Petshi	DEC
(Japan) Shintaro Ishiwatari	DEC
(Russia) Akhmed Musakaev	15:00

2nd Round
(United States) Ian McCall	1:48
(Portugal) Manel Kape	TKO
(Japan) Kyoji Horiguchi	KO
(Brazil) Gabriel Oliviera	4:30
(Germany) Khalid Taha	12:22
(Japan) Takafumi Otsuka	SUB
(France) Kevin Petshi	4:30
(Japan) Shintaro Ishiwatari	KO

Semifinals
(Portugal) Manel Kape	14:28
(Japan) Kyoji Horiguchi	SUB
(Japan) Takafumi Otsuka	15:00
(Japan) Shintaro Ishiwatari	DEC

Final
(Japan) Kyoji Horiguchi	TKO
(Japan) Shintaro Ishiwatari	5:14

== Rizin Women's Super Atomweight Grand Prix 2017 bracket ==
1st Round; Rizin World Grand Prix 2017: opening round part 2
(Japan) Rena Kubota	KO
(United States) Andy Nguyen	3:23
(Japan) Miyuu Yamamoto	7:25
(Spain) Irene Cabello Rivera	SUB
(United States) Alyssa Garcia	15:00
(Brazil) Maria Oliveira	DEC
(Japan) Kanna Asakura	DEC
(Poland) Sylwia Juśkiewicz	15:00

Semifinals
(Japan) Rena Kubota	TKO
(Spain) Irene Cabello Rivera	4:38
(Brazil) Maria Oliveira	8:40
(Japan) Kanna Asakura	SUB

Final
(Japan) Rena Kubota	4:33
(Japan) Kanna Asakura	SUB

== Rizin flyweight KB tournament ==
Semi-finals
(Japan) Tenshin Nasukawa	KO
(Japan) Yuta Hamamoto	4:58
(Japan) Mitsuhisa Sunabe	6:46
(Japan) Yamato Fujita	KO

Final
(Japan) Tenshin Nasukawa	TKO
(Japan) Yamato Fujita	1:27

== Rizin 2017 in Yokohama: Sakura ==
Rizin 2017 at Yokohama: Sakura
- Promotion: Rizin Fighting Federation
- Date: April 16, 2017
- Venue: Yokohama Arena
- City: Yokohama, Japan

Event chronology
Rizin 4 World Grand-Prix 2016: Final Round	Rizin 2017 at Yokohama: Sakura	Rizin Fighting Federation 6

Rizin 2017 in Yokohama: Sakura was a mixed martial arts event held by the Rizin Fighting Federation on April 16, 2017 at the Yokohama Arena in Yokohama, Japan.

=== Results ===
Fight Card
Weight Class				Method	Round	Time	Notes
Featherweight 66 kg	(Japan) Tatsuya Kawajiri	def.	(United States) Anthony Birchak	Decision (unanimous)	2	15:00	
Openweight	(Iran) Amir Aliakbari	def.	(Brazil) Gerônimo Dos Santos	TKO (punches)	1	3:34	
Flyweight 58 kg	(Japan) Kyoji Horiguchi	def.	(Japan) Yuki Motoya	Decision (unanimous)	2	15:00	
Female Atomweight 48 kg	(Japan) Rena Kubota	def.	(Hungary) Dóra Perjés	KO (punch to the body)	1	2:49	
Flyweight 57 kg	(Japan) Tenshin Nasukawa	def.	(Italy) Francesco Ghigliotti	KO (head kick)	1	1:07	
Heavyweight 120 kg	(Japan) Satoshi Ishii	def.	(United States) Heath Herring	Decision (unanimous)	2	15:00	
Female Catchweight 90 kg	(Japan) Reina Miura	def.	(Germany) Jazzy Gabert	Submission (armbar)	2	9:54	
Lightweight 70 kg	(Japan) Yusuke Yachi	def.	(United States) Daron Cruickshank	KO (punch)	1	5:10	
Female Atomweight 48 kg	(Japan) Saori Ishioka	def.	(Switzerland) Bestare Kicaj	Submission (Rear Naked Choke)	1	2:12	
Female Atomweight 48 kg	(Japan) Kanna Asakura	def.	(Bulgaria) Aleksandra Toncheva	Decision (unanimous)	3	15:00	
Flyweight 58 kg	(Japan) Seiichiro Ito	def.	(Japan) Kizaemon Saiga	Decision (unanimous)	2	15:00	

== Rizin World Grand Prix 2017: opening round part 1 ==
Rizin Fighting World Grand Prix 2017 opening round - Natsu no Jin
- Promotion: Rizin Fighting Federation
- Date: July 30, 2017
- Venue: Saitama Super Arena
- City: Saitama, Japan

Event chronology
Rizin FF 5 - Sakura	Rizin Fighting World Grand Prix 2017 opening round - Natsu no Jin	Rizin FF 7: RIZIN World Grand Prix 2017 opening round part 2

Rizin World Grand Prix 2017 opening round part 1 was a mixed martial arts event held by the Rizin Fighting Federation on July 30, 2017 at the Saitama Super Arena in Saitama, Japan.

=== Results ===
Fight Card
Weight Class				Method	Round	Time	Notes
Bantamweight 61 kg	(Japan) Kyoji Horiguchi	def.	(Japan) Hideo Tokoro	KO (punches)	1	1:49	Bantamweight Grand Prix 1st round
Heavyweight 120 kg	(Iran) Amir Aliakbari	def.	(United States) Tyler King	TKO (punches)	1	1:39	
Female Openweight	(Brazil) Gabrielle Garcia	vs.	(Russia) Oksana Gagloeva	No contest (accidental eye poke)	1	0:15	
Female Openweight	(Japan) Reina Miura	def.	(Tonga) Lei'D Tapa	Decision (unanimous)	3	5:00	
Flyweight 57 kg	(Japan) Tenshin Nasukawa	def.	(Japan) Kizaemon Saiga	KO (punch)	1	1:36	Mix Rules
Lightweight 70 kg	(Japan) Yusuke Yachi	def.	(Japan) Satoru Kitaoka	TKO (punches)	2	4:46	
Atomweight 49 kg	(Japan) Miyuu Yamamoto	def.	(United States) Cassie Robb	Decision (unanimous)	3	15:00	
Bantamweight 61 kg	(Japan) Takafumi Otsuka	def.	(United States) Anthony Birchak	Decision (split)	2	15:00	Bantamweight Grand Prix 1st round
Bantamweight 61 kg	(Germany) Khalid Taha	def.	(Japan) Keita Ishibashi	KO (Grounded Knees and Punches)	1	4:51	Bantamweight Grand Prix 1st round
Female Flyweight 57 kg	(United States) Shinju Nozawa-Auclair	def.	(United States) Sheena Brandenburg	Submission (armbar)	1	1:40	
Light Heavyweight 93 kg	(Sweden) Karl Abrektsson	def.	(Lithuania) Teodoras Aukstuolis	Submission (Arm-Triangle Choke)	1	8:02	

== Rizin World Grand Prix 2017: opening round part 2 ==
Rizin Fighting World Grand Prix 2017: opening round - Aki no Jin
- Promotion: Rizin Fighting Federation
- Date: October 15, 2017
- Venue: Marine Messe Fukuoka
- City: Fukuoka, Japan

Event chronology
Rizin World Grand Prix 2017: opening round part 1	Rizin Fighting World Grand Prix 2017: opening round - Aki no Jin

Rizin World Grand Prix 2017: opening round part 2 was a mixed martial arts event held by the Rizin Fighting Federation on October 15, 2017 at the Marine Messe Fukuoka in Fukuoka, Japan.

=== Background ===
Dan Henderson supposed to face fellow MMA legend Kazushi Sakuraba in a grappling match however, Henderson suffered a neck injury and Frank Shamrock step in as a replacement.

Kanna Asakura fought Saori Ishioka at DEEP JEWELS 17 in a Super Atomweight Grand Prix Qualification bout. Asakura won by Unanimous Decision.

Andy Nguyen missed weight.

=== Results ===
Fight Card
Weight Class				Method	Round	Time	Notes
Super Atomweight 49 kg	(Japan) Rena Kubota	def.	(United States) Andy Nguyen	KO (punch to the body)	1	3:23	Women's Super Atomweight Grand Prix 1st round
Flyweight 57 kg	(Japan) Tenshin Nasukawa	def.	(Japan) Yamato Fujita	Decision (unanimous)	3	5:00	
Middleweight 84 kg	(Japan) Kazushi Sakuraba	vs.	(United States) Frank Shamrock	Draw	1	10:00	Grappling Match
Lightweight 70 kg	(Japan) Akiyo Nishiura	def.	(Netherlands) Andy Souwer	Decision (unanimous)	2	15:00	
Catchweight 75 kg	(Japan) Reina Miura	def.	(United States) Crystal Stokes	Decision (unanimous)	3	15:00	
Catchweight 63 kg	(Brazil) Gabriel Oliveira	def.	(Japan) Tatsuya Kawajiri	KO (Knee)	2	1:00	
Bantamweight 61 kg	(Japan) Shintaro Ishiwatari	def.	(Russia) Akhmed Musakaev	Decision (unanimous)	3	15:00	Bantamweight Grand Prix 1st round
Bantamweight 61 kg	(France) Kevin Petshi	def.	(South Korea) Jae Hoon Moon	Decision (split)	3	15:00	Bantamweight Grand Prix 1st round
Bantamweight 61 kg	(Portugal) Manel Kape	def.	(Japan) Erson Yamamoto	TKO (Head Kick and Punch)	1	1:10	Bantamweight Grand Prix 1st round
Openweight	(Guam) Roque Martinez	def.	(France) Jerome Le Banner	Submission (Scarf Hold Chest Choke)	1	2:10	
Super Atomweight 49 kg	(Brazil) Maria Oliveira	def.	(United States) Alyssa Garcia	Decision (unanimous)	3	15:00	Women's Super Atomweight Grand Prix 1st round
Super Atomweight 49 kg	(Japan) Kanna Asakura	def.	(Poland) Sylwia Juśkiewicz	Decision (unanimous)	3	15:00	Women's Super Atomweight Grand Prix 1st round
Super Atomweight 49 kg	(Spain) Irene Cabello Rivera	def.	(Japan) Miyuu Yamamoto	Submission (armbar)	2	7:25	Women's Super Atomweight Grand Prix 1st round
Catchweight 51 kg	(Japan) Jin Mandokoro	def.	(Japan) Issei Ishii	Decision (majority)	3	9:00	Kickboxing
Catchweight 62 kg	(Japan) Yuki	vs.	(Japan) Kurogi Darvish	Draw (majority)	3	9:00	Kickboxing
Catchweight 58 kg	(Japan) Yoshihisa Morimoto	def.	(Japan) Ryota Renseigym	TKO (punches)	3	7:57	Kickboxing

== Rizin World Grand Prix 2017: 2nd round ==
Rizin World Grand Prix 2017: 2nd round
- Promotion: Rizin Fighting Federation
- Date: December 29, 2017
- Venue: Saitama Super Arena
- City: Saitama, Japan

Event chronology
Rizin FF 7: RIZIN World Grand Prix 2017 opening round part 2	Rizin World Grand Prix 2017: 2nd round	Rizin Jiu-Jitsu Open Tournament 2017

Rizin World Grand Prix 2017: 2nd round was a mixed martial arts event held by the Rizin Fighting Federation on December 29, 2017 at the Saitama Super Arena in Saitama, Japan.

=== Background ===
Seiichiro Ito was to face Kai Asakura at this event but had to withdraw due to a nasal fractures. He was replaced by Kizaemon Saiga.

Gabrielle Garcia was scheduled to face Shinobu Kandori at this event. However, Garcia missed weight by over 26 pounds and the bout was canceled.

=== Results ===
Fight Card
Weight Class				Method	Round	Time	Notes
Bantamweight 61 kg	(Japan) Kyoji Horiguchi	def.	(Brazil) Gabriel Oliviera	TKO (punches)	1	4:30	Bantamweight Grand Prix quarter-finals
Bantamweight 61 kg	(Portugal) Manel Kape	def.	(United States) Ian McCall	TKO (doctor Stoppage)	1	1:48	Bantamweight Grand Prix quarter-finals
Bantamweight 61 kg	(Japan) Shintaro Ishiwatari	def.	(France) Kevin Petshi	KO (punch)	1	4:30	Bantamweight Grand Prix quarter-finals
Bantamweight 61 kg	(Japan) Takafumi Otsuka	def.	(Germany) Khalid Taha	Submission (Guillotine Choke)	3	12:22	Bantamweight Grand Prix quarter-finals
Light Heavyweight 93 kg	(Czech Republic) Jiří Procházka	def.	(Sweden) Karl Albrektsson	TKO (punches)	1	9:57	
Women's Lightweight 70 kg	(Belgium) Cindy Dandois	def.	(Japan) Reina Miura	Decision (split)	3	15:00	
Featherweight 66 kg	(Japan) Hiroyuki Takaya	def.	(Mongolia) Baataryn Azjavkhlan	Decision (unanimous)	2	15:00	
Bantamweight 61 kg	(South Korea) Jae Hoon Moon	def.	(United States) Anthony Birchak	Decision (split)	3	15:00	Bantamweight Grand Prix reserve bout
Catchweight 62.5 kg	(Japan) Kai Asakura	def.	(Japan) Kizaemon Saiga	TKO (Punches and Knee)	2	7:36	
Women's Flyweight 57 kg	(Japan) Kana Watanabe	def.	(Japan) Shizuka Sugiyama	Decision (unanimous)	3	15:00	
Catchweight 75 kg	(Japan) Kiichi Kunimoto	def.	(Japan) Satoru Kitaoka	Decision (unanimous)	2	15:00	

== Rizin Fan Expo 2017 ==
Rizin Fan Expo 2017
- Promotion: Rizin Fighting Federation
- Date: December 30, 2017
- Venue: Saitama Super Arena
- City: Saitama, Japan

Event chronology
Rizin World Grand Prix 2017: 2nd Round	Rizin Fan Expo 2017	Rizin World Grand Prix 2017: Final Round

Rizin Fan Expo 2017 was an Expo event held by the Rizin Fighting Federation on December 29–30–31,2017 at the Saitama Super Arena in Saitama, Japan.

=== Background ===
This expo featured the Rizin 2017 jiu-jitsu tournament, a Grappling tournament, a high school Sambo tournament, an amateur Kickboxing tournament and an amateur Mixed martial arts tournament.

== Rizin World Grand Prix 2017: final round ==
Rizin World Grand Prix 2017: final round
- Promotion: Rizin Fighting Federation
- Date: December 31, 2017
- Venue: Saitama Super Arena
- City: Saitama, Japan

Rizin World Grand Prix 2017: final round was a mixed martial arts event held by the Rizin Fighting Federation on December 31, 2017, at the Saitama Super Arena in Saitama, Japan.

=== Background ===
This event included the semi-finals and final of the Rizin Bantamweight Grand Prix. The quarter-finals were held two days previous at Rizin World Grand Prix 2017: 2nd round. Also on the card are the semi-finals and final of the Women's Super Atomweight Grand Prix.

=== Results ===
Fight Card
Weight Class				Method	Round	Time	Notes
Bantamweight 61 kg	(Japan) Kyoji Horiguchi	def.	(Japan) Shintaro Ishiwatari	KO (punches)	2	5:14	Bantamweight Grand Prix final
Super Atomweight 49 kg	(Japan) Kanna Asakura	def.	(Japan) Rena Kubota	Submission (rear-naked choke)	1	4:33	Women's Super Atomweight Grand Prix final
Flyweight 57 kg	(Japan) Tenshin Nasukawa	def.	(Japan) Yamato Fujita	TKO (3 knockdowns)	1	1:27	Flyweight KB Tournament Final
Heavyweight 120 kg	(Croatia) Mirko Cro Cop	def.	(Japan) Tsuyoshi Kohsaka	TKO (punches)	1	1:02	
Women's Flyweight 57 kg	(United States) Shinju Nozawa-Auclair	def.	(United States) Chelsea LaGrasse	Submission (armbar)	1	4:47	
Catchweight 72 kg	(Japan) Yusuke Yachi	def.	(Japan) Takanori Gomi	Submission (triangle choke)	1	2:36	
Super Atomweight 49 kg	(Japan) Kanna Asakura	def.	(Brazil) Maria Oliveira	Submission (armbar)	2	8:40	Women's Super Atomweight Grand Prix semi-finals
Super Atomweight 49 kg	(Japan) Rena Kubota	def.	(Spain) Irene Cabello Rivera	TKO (punches)	1	4:38	Women's Super Atomweight Grand Prix semi-finals
Flyweight 57 kg	(Japan) Yamato Fujita	def.	(Japan) Mitsuhisa Sunabe	KO (punch)	3	6:46	Flyweight KB Tournament Semi-Finals
Flyweight 57 kg	(Japan) Tenshin Nasukawa	def.	(Japan) Yuta Hamamoto	KO (flying knee)	2	4:58	Flyweight KB Tournament Semi-Finals
Bantamweight 61 kg	(Japan) Shintaro Ishiwatari	def.	(Japan) Takafumi Otsuka	Decision (unanimous)	3	15:00	Bantamweight Grand Prix semi-finals
Bantamweight 61 kg	(Japan) Kyoji Horiguchi	def.	(Portugal) Manel Kape	Submission (arm-triangle choke)	3	14:28	Bantamweight Grand Prix semi-finals
