= Trevin Jones =

Guamanian mixed martial artist (born 1990)

- Born: Trevin Jones; August 4, 1990 (age 36); New Orleans, Louisiana, United States
- Other names: 5 Star
- Height: 5 ft 6 in (1.68 m)
- Weight: 135 lb (61 kg; 9 st 9 lb)
- Division: Bantamweight
- Reach: 70.0 in (178 cm)
- Stance: Southpaw
- Fighting out of: Tamuning, Guam
- Team: Tha Yard fitness
- Rank: Black belt in Brazilian Jiu-Jitsu
- Years active: 2011–present

Mixed martial arts record
- Total: 28
- Wins: 14
- By knockout: 3
- By submission: 4
- By decision: 7
- Losses: 13
- By submission: 3
- By decision: 10
- No contests: 1

Other information
- Mixed martial arts record from Sherdog

Trevin Jones (born August 4, 1990) is a Guamanian mixed martial artist who formerly competed in the Bantamweight division of the Ultimate Fighting Championship.(UFC)

== Background ==
Jones started his MMA career when he first enrolled in an amateur fight after just six months of jujitsu. Originally from New Orleans, he moved with his family to the island of Guam when he was 13 to be closer to his uncle who was serving in the Marine Corps.

== Mixed martial arts career ==
=== Early career ===
With his first pro fight in Pacific Xtreme Combat in 2011 against homegrown fighter Kyle Aguon, Jones fought all off his early career for the PXC promotion, during that time fighting Aguon two more times, taking a loss before beating him out for the Bantamweight belt in 2016.

After winning the belt, Jones had fought challengers from around the world, fighting for organizations such as ACA and Japanese DEEP. During this time, he had a pair of split decision losses against Rodrigo Praia and Young Jin Hwang, results that Jones hotly contests, after which he won by guillotine choke against Mehdi Baidulaev at ACA 91 and rear-naked against Japanese veteran Takafumi Otsuka at Deep: 89 Impact.

=== Ultimate Fighting Championship ===
Jones, as a replacement for Mark Striegl on two days notice, faced Timur Valiev on August 22, 2020, at UFC on ESPN: Munhoz vs. Edgar. Jones won the fight via TKO in the second round, completing a comeback after almost getting finished in the first round. This win earned him the Performance of the Night award. On October 7, it was announced that the Nevada State Athletic Commission (NSAC) issued a four and a half month suspension for Trevin Jones, after he tested positive for marijuana in a drug test related to his fight. They also announced that Jones' victory was overturned to a no contest due to the violation. He was fined $1,800 and before he is relicensed in Las Vegas, Jones will also have to pay a prosecution fee of $145.36.

Jones was expected to face Randy Costa on March 6, 2021, at UFC 259. However, Costa withdrew from the bout in mid-February citing injury and was replaced by Mario Bautista. He won the fight via technical knockout in round two.

Jones was scheduled to face Tony Kelley on July 24, 2021, at UFC on ESPN: Sandhagen vs. Dillashaw. However on July 4, Kelly withdrew from the bout for unknown reasons. As a result, Jones was scheduled to face Aaron Phillips. However on July 18, Phillips had to withdraw from the bout and Jones was moved to UFC on ESPN: Hall vs. Strickland on July 30, 2021, against Ronnie Lawrence. In turn, the bout was cancelled when Lawrence failed to show up for the weigh-ins due to health concerns.

Jones, as a replacement for Jesse Strader, was scheduled to face Mana Martinez at UFC on ESPN: Cannonier vs. Gastelum on August 21, 2021. In turn, Martinez pulled out of the fight and was replaced by Saidyokub Kakhramonov. Jones lost the fight via technical submission due to a guillotine choke in round three.

Jones was scheduled to face Raoni Barcelos on December 18, 2021, at UFC Fight Night 199. However Jones withdrew from the fight for undisclosed reasons and he was replaced by Victor Henry.

Jones faced Javid Basharat on March 12, 2022, at UFC Fight Night 203. He lost the bout via unanimous decision.

Jones faced Raoni Barcelos on October 1, 2022, at UFC Fight Night 211. Jones lost the fight by unanimous decision (30-25, 30-27, 30-27) in a one-sided fight.

Jones faced Cody Garbrandt, replacing injured Julio Arce, on March 4, 2023, at UFC 285. He lost the fight via unanimous decision.

On June 5, 2023, news surfaced that Jones had fought out his contract and the organization opted not to renew it.

=== Post UFC ===
Jones faced Wilson Reis on September 8, 2023 at Cage Warriors 159, winning the bout via split decision.

Jones faced Roberto Hernandez on December 15, 2023 at Cage Warriors 165, losing via unanimous decision.

== Championships and accomplishments ==
=== Mixed martial arts ===
- Ultimate Fighting Championship
  - Performance of the Night (One time) vs. Timur Valiev
- Pacific Xtreme Combat
  - PXC Bantamweight Championship (One time)
- MMA Junkie
  - 2020 Comeback of the Year vs. Timur Valiev

== Mixed martial arts record ==
Professional record breakdown
28 matches	14 wins	13 losses
By knockout	3	0
By submission	4	3
By decision	7	10
No contests	1	

Res.	Record	Opponent	Method	Event	Date	Round	Time	Location	Notes
Loss	14–13 (1)	Jay Perrin	Decision (unanimous)	Cage Titans: Revolution	February 21, 2026	3	5:00	Boston, Massachusetts, United States	
Loss	14–12 (1)	Andrew Cruz	Submission (rear-naked choke)	Front Street Fights 29	August 10, 2024	4	4:41	Boise, Idaho, United States	Featherweight debut. For the FSF Featherweight Championship.
Loss	14–11 (1)	Roberto Hernandez	Decision (unanimous)	Cage Warriors 165	December 15, 2023	3	5:00	San Diego, California, United States	
Win	14–10 (1)	Wilson Reis	Decision (split)	Cage Warriors 159	September 8, 2023	3	5:00	San Diego, California, United States	
Loss	13–10 (1)	Cody Garbrandt	Decision (unanimous)	UFC 285	March 4, 2023	3	5:00	Las Vegas, Nevada, United States	
Loss	13–9 (1)	Raoni Barcelos	Decision (unanimous)	UFC Fight Night: Dern vs. Yan	October 1, 2022	3	5:00	Las Vegas, Nevada, United States	
Loss	13–8 (1)	Javid Basharat	Decision (unanimous)	UFC Fight Night: Santos vs. Ankalaev	March 12, 2022	3	5:00	Las Vegas, Nevada, United States	
Loss	13–7 (1)	Saidyokub Kakhramonov	Technical submission (guillotine choke)	UFC on ESPN: Cannonier vs. Gastelum	August 21, 2021	3	4:39	Las Vegas, Nevada, United States	Catchweight (138.5 lb) bout; Kakhramonov missed weight.
Win	13–6 (1)	Mario Bautista	TKO (punches)	UFC 259	March 6, 2021	2	0:40	Las Vegas, Nevada, United States	
NC	12–6 (1)	Timur Valiev	NC (overturned)	UFC on ESPN: Munhoz vs. Edgar	August 22, 2020	2	1:59	Las Vegas, Nevada, United States	Catchweight (140 lb) bout. Performance of the Night. Originally a TKO (punches) win for Jones; overturned after he tested positive for marijuana.
Win	12–6	Takafumi Otsuka	Submission (rear-naked choke)	Deep: 89 Impact	May 12, 2019	2	1:40	Tokyo, Japan	
Win	11–6	Mehdi Baidulaev	Submission (guillotine choke)	ACA 91: Agujev vs. Silvério	January 26, 2019	1	4:37	Grozny, Russia	
Loss	10–6	Rodrigo Praia	Decision (split)	ACB 88: Barnatt vs. Celiński	June 16, 2018	3	5:00	Brisbane, Australia	
Loss	10–5	Hwang Young-jin	Decision (split)	Top FC 18	May 25, 2018	3	5:00	Seoul, South Korea	For the vacant Top FC Bantamweight Championship.
Win	10–4	So Jae-hyun	TKO (punches)	Top FC 16	December 9, 2017	3	0:57	Incheon, South Korea	
Win	9–4	Kyle Aguon	Decision (split)	Pacific Xtreme Combat 55	November 18, 2016	3	5:00	Mangilao, Guam	Won the vacant PXC Bantamweight Championship.
Win	8–4	Jeremiah Labiano	KO (punches)	Pacific Xtreme Combat 52	March 18, 2016	1	N/A	Mangilao, Guam	
Win	7–4	Mark Abelardo	Decision (unanimous)	Pacific Xtreme Combat 49	August 7, 2015	3	5:00	Mangilao, Guam	
Loss	6–4	Kwak Kwan-ho	Decision (split)	Pacific Xtreme Combat 47	March 13, 2015	3	5:00	Mangilao, Guam	
Win	6–3	Toby Misech	Decision (split)	Pacific Xtreme Combat 45	October 24, 2014	3	5:00	Mangilao, Guam	
Win	5–3	Ricky Camp	Decision (split)	Pacific Xtreme Combat 42	February 28, 2014	3	5:00	Mangilao, Guam	
Loss	4–3	Alvin Cacdac	Submission (rear-naked choke)	Pacific Xtreme Combat 40	October 25, 2013	2	0:38	Mangilao, Guam	
Win	4–2	Troy Bantiag	Decision (unanimous)	Pacific Xtreme Combat 37	May 18, 2013	3	5:00	Pasig City, Philippines	
Loss	3–2	Kyle Aguon	Decision (unanimous)	Pacific Xtreme Combat 36	March 8, 2013	3	5:00	Mangilao, Guam	
Win	3–1	Guzman Pia-Yas	Submission (rear-naked choke)	Pacific Xtreme Combat 31	July 14, 2012	1	1:40	Pasig City, Philippines	
Win	2–1	Josh Duenas	Submission (rear-naked choke)	Pacific Xtreme Combat 30	March 3, 2012	1	N/A	Mangilao, Guam	
Loss	1–1	Justin Cruz	Decision (unanimous)	Pacific Xtreme Combat 27	October 29, 2011	5	5:00	Mangilao, Guam	
Win	1–0	Kyle Aguon	Decision (unanimous)	Pacific Xtreme Combat 23	April 29, 2011	3	5:00	Tumon, Guam	Bantamweight debut.

== See also ==
- List of male mixed martial artists
