= Jeong Eun Park =

Korean mixed martial artist

- Born: September 17, 1996 (age 30); Namyangju, South Korea
- Native name: 박정은
- Other names: Female Fedor; Little Wolf
- Nationality: Korean
- Height: 5 ft 2 in (1.57 m)
- Weight: 106.5 lb (48 kg; 7 st 9 lb)
- Division: Atomweight; Strawweight
- Style: Kickboxing, Sambo
- Stance: Orthodox
- Fighting out of: Namyangju, South Korea
- Team: Team Strong Wolf
- Years active: 2015–present

Kickboxing record
- Total: 1
- Wins: 1
- By knockout: 0

Mixed martial arts record
- Total: 19
- Wins: 11
- By knockout: 6
- By submission: 2
- By decision: 3
- Losses: 7
- By knockout: 0
- By submission: 0
- By decision: 7
- Draws: 1

Other information
- Mixed martial arts record from Sherdog

Jeong Eun Park (박정은, born September 17, 1996), is a South Korean mixed martial artist and kickboxer. She currently competes in the atomweight division of Jewels and Road Fighting Championship.

== Mixed martial arts career ==
Park began her mixed martial arts career as an amateur in 2011 though the Road Fighting Championship 'Central League', aimed at developing amateurs. As the 'Central League' had only began to organize women's bouts at the time, Park fought as a strawweight, as her preferred atomweight class wasn't available at the time. In the four years prior to her professional debut, Park amassed a 3—3 record in amateur mixed martial arts, a 5—3 record in combat sambo and a 9—1 record in amateur kickboxing.

Park made her professional mixed martial arts debut against the 24-fight veteran Emi Fujino at Goobne Chicken Road FC 023 on May 2, 2015, in front of an audience of 7000. She stepped in on two-weeks' notice as a replacement for Hyo Kyung Song, who was forced to withdraw with an injury. Park lost the fight by majority decision. She was at the time the youngest female fighter in the history of Road FC.

Park faced the future Pancrase and Shooto champion Satomi Takano at Road FC 025 on August 22, 2015. She lost the fight by majority decision.

Park faced the debuting Xiaoni Liu at Road FC 028 on January 31, 2016. Despite the difficulty she encountered in the standup portion of the bout, Park was able to take her opponent down in the second round and won the fight by an arm triangle choke submission.

Park faced Hisae Watanabe in her first overseas fight at 'Vale Tudo Japan in Osaka' on June 19, 2016. The fight was ruled a draw by majority decision. Two of the judges handed in an even 20—20 scorecard, while the third ringside official scored the fight 20—18 in favor of Park.

Park was expected to face Sharma Devaiah at Road FC 037 XX on March 11, 2017. It was the first all women's fight card in the promotion's history. Devaiah withdrew prior to the bout for undisclosed reasons and was replaced by the debuting Na Young Park. Jeong Eun Park won the fight by a second-round technical knockout.

Park faced another debuting fighter in fellow countrywoman Si Woo Park at Road FC 042 x Chungju World Martial Arts Festival on September 23, 2017. She won the fight by unanimous decision.

Park faced the DEEP JEWELS Atomweight champion Mina Kurobe in a non-title bout at DEEP 81 Impact on December 23, 2017. She lost the fight by unanimous decision.

Park faced Tomo Maesawa in the main event of Deep Jewels 21 on September 16, 2018. She lost the fight by unanimous decision, with scores of 29—29, 29—28 and 30—27.

Park challenged the ROAD FC Women's Atomweight champion Seo Hee Ham at Xiaomi Road FC 051 XX on December 18, 2018. Park justified her role as a significant underdog, as she lost the fight by a clear unanimous decision.

Park was expected to face Yu Ri Shim, who was at the time riding a three-fight winning streak, at Road FC 054 on June 15, 2019. Shim was hospitalized with a bruised kidney after receiving a kick during sparring on June 5 and was replaced by Eun Hye Kim who stepped in on ten's day notice. Park won the fight by a first-round arm triangle submission.

Park faced Emi Sato at Deep Jewels 26 on October 21, 2019. She was able to take her opponent down early in the opening round and won the fight by a first-round technical knockout after transitioning to back mount, which left Sato unable to defend herself.

Park faced Yu Ri Shim at Road FC 057 XX on December 14, 2019. She won the fight by a second-round technical knockout. The two faced each other in an immediate rematch, with the vacant ROAD FC Women's Atomweight Championship on the line, at ROAD FC 59 on September 4, 2021. Neither faced any other opponent in the interim, due to a forced break in competition caused by the COVID-19 pandemic. Park failed to replicate her earlier success however, as she lost the fight by split decision.

Park faced Yoon Ha Hong at Road FC 61 on July 23, 2022. Hong failed to make the atomweight limit at the official weigh-ins, as she weighed-in 1.6 lbs over the agreed upon limit. Park won the fight by a first-round technical knockout.

Park faced the one-time Jewels Atomweight title challenger Moeri Suda at Deep Jewels 41 on May 28, 2023. She won the fight by a first-round technical knockout. Park was ranked as the sixth-best atomweight in the world by Fight Matrix following this victory.

Park was expected to face HIME at Deep Jewels 44 on March 24, 2024. She was forced to withdraw from the bout on March 18, due to an injury sustained in training.

On December 23, 2023, the reigning ROAD FC Women's Atomweight champion Yu Ri Shim vacated the belt, citing "personal reasons". The promotion promoted Park to interim status on that same day. Park was expected to face Yu Jin Shin for the ROAD FC Women's Atomweight Championship at Road FC 70 on October 27, 2024. Shin suffered a ruptured finger ligament on October 15 and was forced to withdraw from the contest. She was replaced by the debuting Ako, who stepped in on two weeks notice. Park needed just 55 seconds to stop her opponent with a series of punches.

Park was once expected to face the undefeated Yu Jin Shin for the ROAD FC Women's Atomweight Championship at Road FC 71 on December 29, 2024. She was forced to withdraw from the contest due to an orbital fracture she suffered during training. Park's hiatus was prolonged by a back disk injury.

Park returned from a two-year hiatus to face Seo Young Park for the vacant Road FC Women's Atomweight Championship at Road FC 77 on May 30, 2026. She won the fight by unanimous decision.

== Kickboxing career ==
Park made her professional kickboxing debut against Mariya Suzuki at HEAT 45 on July 28, 2019. She won the fight by split decision.

== Championships and accomplishments ==
=== Sambo ===
- Sambo Union of Asia and Oceania
  - 2013 Asian Championships for Combat Sambo Runner-up (-52 kg)
- Korean National Sports Festival
  - 2015 National Sports Festival Sambo Championship Winner (-62 kg)

=== Mixed martial arts ===
- Road Fighting Championship
  - 2019 Female Athlete of the Year Award
  - Road FC Women's Atomweight Championship

== Mixed martial arts record ==
Professional record breakdown
19 matches	11 wins	7 losses
By knockout	6	0
By submission	2	0
By decision	3	7
Draws	1	

Res.	Record	Opponent	Method	Event	Date	Round	Time	Location	Notes
Win	11–7–1	Seo Young Park	Decision (unanimous)	Road FC 77	May 30, 2026	3	5:00	Seoul, South Korea	Won the vacant Road FC Women's Atomweight Championship
Win	10–7–1	Ako	TKO (punches)	Road FC 70	October 27, 2024	1	0:55	Wonju, South Korea	110 lbs catchweight bout
Win	9–7–1	Moeri Suda	TKO (punches)	Deep Jewels 41	May 28, 2023	1	4:27	Tokyo, Japan	
Win	8–7–1	Yoon Ha Hong	TKO (punches)	Road FC 61	July 23, 2022	1	2:28	Wonju, South Korea	
Loss	7–7–1	Yu Ri Shim	Decision (split)	ROAD FC 59	September 4, 2021	3	5:00	Wonju, South Korea	For the vacant Road FC Women's Atomweight Championship
Win	7–6–1	Yu Ri Shim	TKO (punches)	Road FC 057 XX	December 14, 2019	2	1:09	Seoul, South Korea	
Win	6–6–1	Emi Sato	TKO (punches)	Deep Jewels 26	October 22, 2019	1	2:36	Tokyo, Japan	
Win	5–6–1	Eun Hye Kim	Technical submission (arm triangle choke)	Road FC 054	June 15, 2019	1	2:51	Wonju, South Korea	Return to atomweight
Loss	4–6–1	Yulia Litvinceva	Decision (unanimous)	CKF: ATT 2019 Action	January 19, 2019	3	5:00	Zhuhai, China	Return to strawweight
Loss	4–5–1	Seo Hee Ham	Decision (unanimous)	Road FC 051 XX	December 15, 2018	3	5:00	Seoul, South Korea	For the Road FC Women's Atomweight Championship
Loss	4–4–1	Tomo Maesawa	Decision (unanimous)	Deep Jewels 21	September 16, 2018	3	5:00	Tokyo, Japan	
Win	4–3–1	Emi Tomimatsu	Decision (unanimous)	Deep Jewels 20	June 9, 2018	3	5:00	Tokyo, Japan	
Loss	3–3–1	Mina Kurobe	Decision (unanimous)	DEEP 81 Impact	December 23, 2017	3	5:00	Tokyo, Japan	
Win	3–2–1	Si Woo Park	Decision (unanimous)	Road FC 042 x Chungju World Martial Arts Festival	September 23, 2017	2	5:00	Chungju, South Korea	
Win	2–2–1	Na Young Park	TKO (punches)	Road FC 037 XX	March 11, 2017	2	2:07	Seoul, South Korea	
Draw	1–2–1	Hisae Watanabe	Decision (majority)	VTJ in Osaka	June 19, 2016	2	5:00	Osaka, Japan	
Win	1–2	Xiaoni Liu	Technical submission (arm triangle choke)	Road FC 028	January 31, 2016	2	2:24	Seoul, South Korea	
Loss	0–2	Satomi Takano	Decision (majority)	Road FC 025	August 22, 2015	2	5:00	Wonju, South Korea	Atomweight debut
Loss	0–1	Emi Fujino	Decision (majority)	Road FC 023	May 2, 2015	2	5:00	Seoul, South Korea	Strawweight debut

== Kickboxing record ==
Kickboxing record
1 Win (0 (T)KOs), 0 Losses, 0 Draws, 0 No Contests
Date	Result	Opponent	Event	Location	Method	Round	Time
2019-07-28	Win	(Japan) Mariya Suzuki	HEAT 45	Nagoya, Japan	Decision (Split)	3	3:00
Legend: Win Loss Draw/No contest Notes

== See also ==
- List of female mixed martial artists
- List of female kickboxers
