= 2015 in Road FC =

Mixed martial arts events

Information
- Promotion: Road Fighting Championship
- First date: February 1, 2015
- Last date: December 26, 2015

Events
- Total events: 7

Fights
- Total fights: 101
- Title fights: 6

Chronology
| 2014 in Road FC | 2015 in Road FC | 2016 in Road FC |

The year 2015 was the 6th year in the history of the Road Fighting Championship, an MMA promotion based in South Korea. 2015 started with Road FC 021: Champions day and ended with Road FC 027: In China.

== List of events ==
| # | Event Title | Main Event | Date | Arena | Location |
|---|---|---|---|---|---|
| 7 | Road FC 027: In China | Choi vs. Luo | December 26, 2015 | Shanghai Oriental Sports Center | (China) Shanghai |
| 6 | Road FC 026 | Song vs. Jo | October 9, 2015 | Jangchung Arena | (South Korea) Seoul |
| 5 | Road FC 025 | Lee vs. Choi | August 22, 2015 | Wonju Chiak Gymnasium | (South Korea) Wonju, Gangwon |
| 4 | Road FC 024: In Japan | Fukuda vs. Jeon | July 25, 2015 | Ariake Coliseum | (Japan) Tokyo |
| 3 | Road FC 023 | Lee vs. Moon | May 2, 2015 | Jangchung Arena | (South Korea) Seoul |
| 2 | Road FC 022 | Kwon vs. Lee | March 21, 2015 | Jangchung Arena | (South Korea) Seoul |
| 1 | Road FC 021: Champions day | Choi vs. Seo | February 1, 2015 | Jangchung Arena | (South Korea) Seoul |

== Road FC 027: In China ==
Road FC 027: In China

Information
- Promotion: Road Fighting Championship
- Date: February 1, 2015
- Venue: Shanghai Oriental Sports Center
- City: (China) Shanghai

Event chronology
| Road FC 026 | Road FC 027: In China | Road FC 028 |

Xiaomi Road FC 027: In China was an MMA event held by Road FC on December 26, 2015, at the Shanghai Oriental Sports Center in Shanghai, China.

=== Results ===
Part 2
| Weight class | | | | Method | Round | Time | Notes |
|---|---|---|---|---|---|---|---|
| Openweight | (South Korea) Hong Man Choi | def. | (China) Quanchao Luo | TKO (retirement) | 1 | 3:14 | (Note: Road FC Openweight tournament quarter-finals) |
| Lightweight | (China) Lipeng Zhang | def. | (South Korea) Young Gi Hong | Submission (rear naked choke) | 1 | 1:33 |
| Openweight | (China) Aorigele | def. | (South Korea) Jae Hoon Kim | TKO (punches) | 1 | 0:24 | (Note: Road FC Openweight tournament quarter-finals) |
| Light heavyweight | (China) Zilong Zhao | def. | (Japan) Minowaman | TKO (punches) | 1 | 1:24 |
| Bantamweight | (China) Zhikang Zhao | def. | (South Korea) Mu Song Choi | Decision (2-1) | 2 | 5:00 |
| Lightweight | (Mongolia) Nandin Erdene | def. | (China) Yincang Bao | Decision (3-0) | 2 | 5:00 |
Part 1
| Weight class | | | | Method | Round | Time | Notes |
| Openweight | (United States) Mighty Mo | def. | (South Korea) Mu Bae Choi | TKO (punches) | 1 | 3:43 | (Note: Road FC Openweight tournament quarter-finals) |
| Openweight | (South Korea) Hyun Man Myung | def. | (China) Lingyu Liang | KO (punch) | 1 | 0:13 | (Note: Road FC Openweight tournament quarter-finals) |
| Featherweight | (China) Nannan He | def. | (Japan) Daisaku Tanaka | TKO (punches) | 1 | 1:52 |
| Women's Atomweight | (China) Xiaonan Yan | def. | (South Korea) Ye Hyun Nam | Decision (3-0) | 2 | 5:00 |
| Featherweight | (South Korea) Jong Chan Choi | def. | (China) Yibugele | Decision (3-0) | 2 | 5:00 |

== Road FC 026 ==
Road FC 026

Information
- Promotion: Road Fighting Championship
- Date: October 9, 2015
- Venue: Jangchung Gymnasium
- City: (South Korea) Seoul

Event chronology
| Road FC 025 | Road FC 026 | Road FC 027: In China |

360GAME Road FC 026 was an MMA event held by Road FC on October 9, 2015, at the Jangchung Gymnasium in Seoul, South Korea.

=== Results ===
Main card
| Weight class | | | | Method | Round | Time | Notes |
|---|---|---|---|---|---|---|---|
| Flyweight | (South Korea) Min Jong Song (ic) | def. | (South Korea) Nam Jin Jo (c) | Decision (3-0) | 4 | 5:00 | (Note: For the Unification Road FC Flyweight Championship) |
| Heavyweight | (United States) Mighty Mo | def. | (South Korea) Mu Bae Choi | KO (punch) | 1 | 0:37 |
| Openweight | (South Korea) Hyun Man Myung | def. | (Japan) Jairo Kusunoki | TKO (punches) | 1 | 0:35 |
| Featherweight | (South Korea) Young Gi Hong | def. | (China) Nannan He | Decision (3-0) | 3 | 5:00 |
| Lightweight | (Japan) Shinji Sasaki | def. | (South Korea) Jong Chan Choi | Submission (key lock) | 3 | 1:25 |
| Bantamweight | (South Korea) Yi Moon Han | def. | (China) Ye Yuan | Decision (1-0) | 2 | 5:00 |
| Lightweight | (South Korea) Seung Yeon Kim | def. | (South Korea) Doo Je Jung | KO (punch) | 1 | 0:30 |
Young Guns 025
| Weight class | | | | Method | Round | Time | Notes |
| Featherweight | (United States) Tyrone Henderson | def. | (South Korea) Sang Jun Seok | TKO (punches) | 2 | 4:06 |
| Welterweight | (South Korea) Chul Yoon | def. | (Brazil) Karim Bouraarassi | TKO (punches) | 2 | 4:06 |
| Bantamweight | (South Korea) Mu Song Choi | def. | (South Korea) Dae Young Jang | Decision (2-1) | 2 | 5:00 |
| -80 kg Catchweight | (South Korea) In Jae La | def. | (Japan) Kiyoshi Kuwabara | TKO (punches) | 2 | 0:14 |
| Featherweight | (South Korea) Jae Woong Yang | def. | (Japan) Toji Ueno | Decision (3-0) | 2 | 5:00 |
| -67 kg Catchweight | (South Korea) Mi Nam Kim | def. | (South Korea) Kwang Seok Jung | Decision (3-0) | 2 | 5:00 |
| Bantamweight | (South Korea) Ik Hwan Jang | def. | (South Korea) Do Yoon Hwang | TKO (punches) | 1 | 2:11 |
| Featherweight | (South Korea) Tae Ho Jin | def. | (South Korea) Dong Soo Seo | Submission (armbar) | 1 | 4:30 |

== Road FC 025 ==
Road FC 025

Information
- Promotion: Road Fighting Championship
- Date: August 22, 2015
- Venue: Jangchung Gymnasium
- City: (South Korea) Wonju, Gangwon

Event chronology
| Road FC 024: In Japan | Road FC 025 | Road FC 026 |

360GAME Road FC 025 was an MMA event held by Road FC on August 22, 2015, at the Wonju Chiak Gymnasium in Wonju, Gangwon, South Korea.

=== Results ===
Main card
| Weight class | | | | Method | Round | Time | Notes |
|---|---|---|---|---|---|---|---|
| Featherweight | (South Korea) Yoon Jun Lee | def. | (South Korea) Mu Gyeom Choi | Decision (3-0) | 3 | 5:00 |
| Featherweight | (South Korea) Soo Chul Kim | def. | (Brazil) Marlon Sandro | Decision (0-0) | 3 | 5:00 |
| Middleweight | (South Korea) Nae Chul Kim | def. | (China) Xin Dong | TKO (punches) | 2 | 1:14 |
| Bantamweight | (Japan) Yuta Nezu | def. | (South Korea) Hyung Geun Park | TKO (punches) | 1 | 0:21 |
| Welterweight | (South Korea) Seok Mo Kim | def. | (Turkey) Onur Teker | TKO (punches) | 1 | 1:55 |
| Women's Atomweight | (Japan) Satomi Takano | def. | (South Korea) Jeong Eun Park | Decision (2-0) | 2 | 5:00 |
| -64.5 kg Catchweight | (South Korea) Min Seok Kwon | def. | (China) Ze Wu | TKO (punches) | 1 | 2:44 |
Young Guns 024
| Weight class | | | | Method | Round | Time | Notes |
| -67.5 kg Catchweight | (South Korea) Won Gi Kim | def. | (South Korea) Doo Je Jung | DQ (stamping kick) | 1 | 0:35 |
| Lightweight | (South Korea) Won Bin Ki | def. | (South Korea) Choong Il Park | TKO (punches) | 1 | 1:18 |
| Lightweight | (South Korea) Kyung Pyo Kim | def. | (South Korea) Young Jun Cho | Decision (3-0) | 2 | 5:00 |
| Flyweight | (South Korea) Jae Nam Yoo | def. | (Turkey) Kaan Kazgan | TKO (retirement) | 1 | 5:00 |
| Lightweight | (South Korea) Chan Sol Park | def. | (South Korea) Yi Sak Kim (A) | Decision (3-0) | 2 | 5:00 |
| Flyweight | (South Korea) Jong Hyun Kwak | def. | (South Korea) Jun Hoe Jung | Decision (3-0) | 2 | 5:00 |
| Middleweight | (South Korea) Young Jun Jeon | def. | (South Korea) In Yong Choi | KO (punch) | 1 | 3:27 |
| -72 kg Catchweight | (South Korea) Hae Jin Park | def. | (South Korea) Jong Chan Choi | Decision (3-0) | 2 | 5:00 |
| Flyweight | (South Korea) Woo Jae Kim | def. | (South Korea) Won Jun Lee | Decision (2-1) | 2 | 5:00 |

== Road FC 024: In Japan ==
Road FC 024: In Japan

Information
- Promotion: Road Fighting Championship
- Date: July 25, 2015
- Venue: Ariake Coliseum
- City: (Japan) Tokyo

Event chronology
| Road FC 023 | Road FC 024: In Japan | Road FC 025 |

360GAME Road FC 024: In Japan was an MMA event held by Road FC on July 25, 2015, at the Ariake Coliseum in Tokyo, Japan.

=== Results ===
Main card
| Weight class | | | | Method | Round | Time | Notes |
|---|---|---|---|---|---|---|---|
| Middleweight | (Japan) Riki Fukuda | def. | (South Korea) Uh Jin Jeon | TKO (punches) | 1 | 2:51 | (Note: For the vacant Road FC Middleweight Championship) |
| Heavyweight | (Brazil) Carlos Toyota | def. | (South Korea) Hong Man Choi | KO (punch) | 1 | 1:29 |
| Heavyweight | (South Korea) Mu Bae Choi | def. | (Japan) Yusuke Kawaguchi | TKO (punches) | 2 | 4:51 |
| Middleweight | (Japan) Minowaman | def. | (South Korea) Dae Sung Kim | Decision (3-0) | 3 | 5:00 |
| Bantamweight | (South Korea) Soo Chul Kim | def. | (Japan) Taiyo Nakahara | Submission (guillotine choke) | 1 | 4:36 |
| -88 kg Catchweight | (South Korea) Dong Sik Yoon | def. | (Japan) Daiju Takase | Decision (2-1) | 3 | 5:00 |
| Women's -45 kg Catchweight | (Japan) Satoko Shinashi | def. | (South Korea) Ye Ji Lee | TKO (punches) | 2 | 4:50 |
| Lightweight | (South Korea) Kwang Hee Lee | def. | (Japan) Juri Ohara | TKO (punches) | 1 | 3:54 |
Young Guns 023
| Weight class | | | | Method | Round | Time | Notes |
| Featherweight | (South Korea) Young Gi Hong | def. | (Japan) Hirokazu Konno | Decision (3-0) | 2 | 5:00 |
| Featherweight | (South Korea) Min Woo Kim | def. | (Japan) Shoko Sato | Decision (3-0) | 2 | 5:00 |
| Featherweight | (Japan) Toru Harai | def. | (South Korea) Ho Jun Kim | Submission (rear naked choke) | 2 | 3:40 |
| Flyweight | (Japan) Go Minamide | def. | (South Korea) Hyo Ryeong Kim | Decision (3-0) | 2 | 5:00 |
| Featherweight | (South Korea) Seung Min Baek | def. | (Japan) Akira Enomoto | TKO (punches) | 1 | 0:42 |
| Middleweight | (Japan) Hiroki Ozaki | def. | (Japan) Yuta Nakamura | Decision (3-0) | 2 | 5:00 |
| Featherweight | (Japan) Kazushi Sugiyama | def. | (Japan) Daiki Takashima | TKO (punches) | 1 | 2:44 |
| Featherweight | (Japan) Sho Kogane | def. | (Japan) Hayato Sawai | Submission (rear naked choke) | 1 | 2:43 |
| Bantamweight | (Japan) Sho Oba | def. | (Japan) Katsuya Nagamine | Decision (3-0) | 2 | 5:00 |
| Flyweight | (Japan) Yuki Suzuki | def. | (Japan) Takehito Tanabe | TKO (punches) | 1 | 2:50 |

== Road FC 023 ==
Road FC 023

Information
- Promotion: Road Fighting Championship
- Date: May 2, 2015
- Venue: Jangchung Gymnasium
- City: (South Korea) Seoul

Event chronology
| Road FC 022 | Road FC 023 | Road FC 024: In Japan |

Goobne Chicken Road FC 023 was an MMA event held by Road FC on May 2, 2015, at the Jangchung Gymnasium in Seoul, South Korea.

=== Results ===
Main card
| Weight class | | | | Method | Round | Time | Notes |
|---|---|---|---|---|---|---|---|
| Bantamweight | (South Korea) Yoon Jun Lee (c) | def. | (South Korea) Je Hoon Moon | Decision (3-0) | 3 | 5:00 | (Note: For the Road FC Bantamweight Championship) |
| Heavyweight | (South Korea) Mu Bae Choi | def. | (Brazil) Lucas Tani | TKO (punches) | 1 | 1:46 |
| Woman's -63 kg Catchweight | (South Korea) Ji Yeon Kim | def. | (Netherlands) Hatice Ozyurt | Submission (armbar) | 2 | 1:14 |
| Women's Strawweight | (Japan) Emi Fujino | def. | (South Korea) Jeong Eun Park | Decision (2-0) | 2 | 5:00 |
| Lightweight | (South Korea) Seung Yeon Kim | def. | (Mongolia) Nandin-Erdene | KO (knee) | 1 | 3:58 |
| -84 kg Catchweight | (Brazil) Karim Bouraarassi | def. | (South Korea) Chang Seob Lee | TKO (punches) | 1 | 0:18 |
Young Guns 022
| Weight class | | | | Method | Round | Time | Notes |
| Welterweight | (South Korea) In Ho Cha | def. | (South Korea) Gyu Seok Son | TKO (punches) | 2 | 2:25 |
| Welterweight | (South Korea) Seok Mo Kim | def. | (Japan) Yutaro Kawaguchi | TKO (punches) | 1 | 4:26 |
| Featherweight | (South Korea) Sung Ho Hong | def. | (South Korea) Young Sam Jung | Decision (2-1) | 2 | 5:00 |
| Lightweight | (South Korea) Jin Ho Son | def. | (South Korea) Jong Chan Choi | Decision (3-0) | 2 | 5:00 |
| Middleweight | (South Korea) In Jae La | def. | (South Korea) Hyun Min Kim | Decision (3-0) | 2 | 5:00 |
| Bantamweight | (South Korea) Dae Young Jang | def. | (South Korea) Seok Chan Jung | TKO (punches) | 1 | 0:49 |
| Flyweight | (South Korea) Jong Hyun Kwak | def. | (South Korea) Jong Tae Hong | Decision (3-0) | 2 | 5:00 |
| Welterweight | (South Korea) Jin Soo Seo | def. | (South Korea) Yoon Jin Lee | TKO (punches) | 1 | 4:01 |

== Road FC 022 ==
Road FC 022

Information
- Promotion: Road Fighting Championship
- Date: March 21, 2015
- Venue: Jangchung Gymnasium
- City: (South Korea) Seoul

Event chronology
| Road FC 021: Champions day | Road FC 022 | Road FC 023 |

Goobne Chicken Road FC 022 was an MMA event held by Road FC on March 21, 2015, at the Jangchung Gymnasium in Seoul, South Korea.

=== Results ===
Main card
| Weight class | | | | Method | Round | Time | Notes |
|---|---|---|---|---|---|---|---|
| Lightweight | (South Korea) A Sol Kwon (c) | def. | (South Korea) Kwang Hee Lee | TKO (doctor stop) | 3 | 1:12 | (Note: For the Road FC Lightweight Championship) |
| Middleweight | (Japan) Riki Fukuda | def. | (South Korea) Dool Hee Lee | TKO (punches) | 2 | 3:57 |
| Middleweight | (South Korea) Uh Jin Jeon | def. | (South Korea) Jung Kyo Park | Decision (3-0) | 3 | 5:00 |
| Bantamweight | (South Korea) Young Seung Cho | def. | (Japan) Issei Tamura | Submission (rear naked choke) | 2 | 3:57 |
| Heavyweight | (Brazil) Lucas Tani | def. | (South Korea) Gun Oh Shim | Submission (armbar) | 1 | 1:45 |
| Welterweight | (Japan) Kiyoshi Kuwabara | def. | (South Korea) Seok Mo Kim | TKO (punches) | 1 | 0:17 |
Young Guns 021
| Weight class | | | | Method | Round | Time | Notes |
| -68 kg Catchweight | (South Korea) Hyung Soo Kim | def. | (South Korea) Brian Choi | Decision (3-0) | 2 | 5:00 |
| Welterweight | (South Korea) Jong Mok Kim | def. | (South Korea) Jin Kyu Lee | TKO (punches) | 1 | 2:44 |
| Bantamweight | (South Korea) Jae Ho Lee | def. | (Japan) Daisaku Tanaka | Submission (rear naked choke) | 1 | 4:02 |
| Bantamweight | (South Korea) Jung Gi Hong | def. | (South Korea) Mu Song Choi | Submission (rear naked choke) | 2 | 3:54 |
| Flyweight | (South Korea) Kyu Hwa Kim | def. | (South Korea) Jong Hyun Kwak | Submission (rear naked choke) | 1 | 4:25 |
| Lightweight | (South Korea) Yoon Jae Jung | def. | (South Korea) Sang Il Lee | TKO (punches) | 1 | 4:37 |
| Flyweight | (South Korea) Jong Heon Chae | def. | (South Korea) Jin Min Kim | Submission (rear naked choke) | 2 | 1:20 |

== Road FC 021: Champions Day ==
Road FC 021: Champions day

Information
- Promotion: Road Fighting Championship
- Date: February 1, 2015
- Venue: Jangchung Gymnasium
- City: (South Korea) Seoul

Event chronology
| Road FC 020 | Road FC 021: Champions day | Road FC 022 |

Goobne Chicken Road FC 021: Champions Day was an MMA event held by Road FC on February 1, 2015, at the Jangchung Gymnasium in Seoul, South Korea.

=== Results ===
Main card
| Weight class | | | | Method | Round | Time | Notes |
|---|---|---|---|---|---|---|---|
| Featherweight | (South Korea) Mu Gyeom Choi (c) | def. | (South Korea) Doo Won Seo | Decision (2-1) | 4 | 5:00 | (Note: For the Road FC Featherweight Championship) |
| Flyweight | (South Korea) Min Jong Song | def. | (Japan) Takeshi Kasugai | Decision (3-0) | 4 | 5:00 | (Note: For the Interim Road FC Flyweight Championship) |
| Bantamweight | (South Korea) Soo Chul Kim | def. | (Brazil) Wagner Campos | TKO (punches) | 1 | 2:18 |
| Lightweight | (Japan) Shinji Sasaki | def. | (South Korea) Chang Hyun Kim | Decision (3-0) | 3 | 5:00 |
| Women's Atomweight | (South Korea) Ji Hye Park | def. | (Japan) Miyuki Irie | TKO (punches) | 2 | 3:31 |
| Featherweight | (United States) Tyrone Henderson | def. | (South Korea) Young Gi Hong | Submission (modified kimura lock) | 1 | 3:42 |
Young Guns 020
| Weight class | | | | Method | Round | Time | Notes |
| Featherweight | (South Korea) Won Gi Kim | def. | (South Korea) Seok Chan Jung | Submission (armbar) | 2 | 4:25 |
| Lightweight | (South Korea) Kyung Pyo Kim | def. | (South Korea) Je Il Jung | TKO (punches) | 1 | 1:39 |
| Featherweight | (South Korea) Dae Young Jang | def. | (South Korea) Min Ho Kim | TKO (punches) | 1 | 2:32 |
| Welterweight | (South Korea) Jae Sung Oh | def. | (Japan) Shota Fujii | Decision (2-1) | 2 | 5:00 |
| -60 kg Catchweight | (South Korea) Jong Heon Chae | def. | (South Korea) Woo Jae Kim | Submission (rear naked choke) | 1 | 4:16 |
| Welterweight | (South Korea) Jae Woong Yang | def. | (South Korea) Yi Sak Kim (A) | Decision (2-1) | 2 | 5:00 |
| Welterweight | (South Korea) Ik Hwan Jang | def. | (South Korea) Jae Sung Park | Decision (3-0) | 2 | 5:00 |
| Flyweight | (South Korea) Ho Young Yoon | def. | (South Korea) Jae Kyung Kim | Decision (3-0) | 2 | 5:00 |

== See also ==
- List of Road FC events
- List of Road FC champions
- List of current Road FC fighters
- List of current mixed martial arts champions
