= Alateng Heili =

Chinese mixed martial arts fighter

- Born: December 14, 1991 (age 34); Alxa, Inner Mongolia, China
- Other names: The Mongolian Knight
- Height: 5 ft 6 in (1.68 m)
- Weight: 135 lb (61 kg; 9 st 9 lb)
- Division: Flyweight; Bantamweight
- Reach: 66.5 in (169 cm)
- Style: Freestyle wrestling
- Fighting out of: Inner Mongolia, China
- Team: UFC PI Shanghai; Fight Ready (2021–present)
- Years active: 2013–present

Mixed martial arts record
- Total: 31
- Wins: 18
- By knockout: 5
- By submission: 3
- By decision: 10
- Losses: 11
- By knockout: 3
- By submission: 1
- By decision: 7
- Draws: 2

Other information
- Mixed martial arts record from Sherdog

Alateng Heili (Chinese: 阿拉腾黑力; born December 14, 1991) is a Chinese mixed martial artist who competes in the Bantamweight division of the Ultimate Fighting Championship.

== Background ==
Following his father's footsteps, Alateng started wrestling in school. Eventually he was spotted by a talent scout and was invited to join a team in Beijing, where he started to develop an interest in mixed martial arts.

== Mixed martial arts career ==
=== Early career ===
Starting his career in 2013, Heili compiled a 12–7–1 record in various Asian organizations, most notably fighting in Road FC, which one of the fights being against future Rizin champ, Kai Asakura. Asakura won the fight after 29 seconds, hitting Heili with a short left hook, followed by a knee strike. Asakura suffered his first career loss to Je Hoon Moon during Road FC 39, losing by way of TKO.

=== Ultimate Fighting Championship ===
Alatang made his debut on August 31, 2019, at UFC Fight Night 157 against Danaa Batgerel. He won the fight via unanimous decision. This fight earned him the Fight of the Night award.

Alateng faced Ryan Benoit on December 21, 2019, at UFC Fight Night 165. He won the fight via split decision.

Alateng was expected to face Casey Kenney on September 27, 2020 at UFC 253. However, for unknown reasons, it was moved to UFC on ESPN 16 on October 4, 2020. He lost the fight via unanimous decision.

Alateng faced Gustavo Lopez on September 18, 2021, at UFC Fight Night 192. The fight ended up with a draw.

Alateng faced Kevin Croom at UFC on ESPN 34 on April 16, 2022. He won the fight via technical knockout early into the first round.

Alateng faced Chad Anheilger on September 10, 2022, at UFC 279. He won the fight via unanimous decision.

Alateng was scheduled to face Rani Yahya on October 14, 2023, at UFC Fight Night 230. However, Yahya withdrew from the bout for undisclosed reasons. In turn, Alateng replaced Montel Jackson to face Chris Gutiérrez at the same event. He lost the fight via unanimous decision.

Alateng was scheduled to face Victor Hugo on April 6, 2024 at UFC Fight Night 240. However, Alateng pulled out due to illness on fight week and promotional newcomer Pedro Falcão stepped in as a replacement on three days' notice.

Alateng faced Kleydson Rodrigues on May 18, 2024, at UFC Fight Night 241. He won the fight by unanimous decision.

Alateng faced Da'Mon Blackshear on April 26, 2025 at UFC on ESPN 66. He lost the fight by unanimous decision.

Alateng faced John Castañeda on September 26, 2026 at UFC Fight Night 289. He won the fight by split decision.

Replacing Adrian Yañez on short notice, Alateng faced Juan Díaz on November 14, 2026 at UFC 334. At the weigh-ins, Díaz weighed in at 136.4 pounds, 0.4 pounds over the bantamweight non-title fight limit. The fight proceeded at catchweight and Díaz was fined 20 percent of his individual purse which went to Alateng. He lost the fight by unanimous decision.

== Championships and accomplishments ==
=== Mixed martial arts ===
- Ultimate Fighting Championship
  - Fight of the Night (One time) vs. Danaa Batgerel

== Mixed martial arts record ==
Professional record breakdown
31 matches	18 wins	11 losses
By knockout	5	3
By submission	3	1
By decision	10	7
Draws	2	

Res.	Record	Opponent	Method	Event	Date	Round	Time	Location	Notes
Loss	18–11–2	Juan Díaz	Decision (unanimous)	UFC 334	November 14, 2026	3	5:00	New York City, New York, United States	Catchweight (136.4 lb) bout; Díaz missed weight.
Win	18–10–2	John Castañeda	Decision (split)	UFC Fight Night: Rosas Jr. vs. Barcelos	September 26, 2026	3	5:00	Las Vegas, Nevada, United States	
Loss	17–10–2	Da'Mon Blackshear	Decision (unanimous)	UFC on ESPN: Machado Garry vs. Prates	April 26, 2025	3	5:00	Kansas City, Missouri, United States	
Win	17–9–2	Kleydson Rodrigues	Decision (unanimous)	UFC Fight Night: Barboza vs. Murphy	May 18, 2024	3	5:00	Las Vegas, Nevada, United States	
Loss	16–9–2	Chris Gutiérrez	Decision (unanimous)	UFC Fight Night: Yusuff vs. Barboza	October 14, 2023	3	5:00	Las Vegas, Nevada, United States	
Win	16–8–2	Chad Anheliger	Decision (unanimous)	UFC 279	September 10, 2022	3	5:00	Las Vegas, Nevada, United States	
Win	15–8–2	Kevin Croom	TKO (punches)	UFC on ESPN: Luque vs. Muhammad 2	April 16, 2022	1	0:47	Las Vegas, Nevada, United States	
Draw	14–8–2	Gustavo Lopez	Draw (unanimous)	UFC Fight Night: Smith vs. Spann	September 18, 2021	3	5:00	Las Vegas, Nevada, United States	Alateng was deducted one point in round 3 due to repeatedly grabbing the cage.
Loss	14–8–1	Casey Kenney	Decision (unanimous)	UFC on ESPN: Holm vs. Aldana	October 4, 2020	3	5:00	Abu Dhabi, United Arab Emirates	
Win	14–7–1	Ryan Benoit	Decision (split)	UFC Fight Night: Edgar vs. Korean Zombie	December 21, 2019	3	5:00	Busan, South Korea	
Win	13–7–1	Danaa Batgerel	Decision (unanimous)	UFC Fight Night: Andrade vs. Zhang	August 31, 2019	3	5:00	Shenzhen, China	Fight of the Night.
Win	12–7–1	Kwak Jong-hyun	TKO (punches)	Road FC 47	May 12, 2018	2	2:40	Beijing, China	Catchweight (138 lb) bout.
Win	11–7–1	Jang Ik-hwan	TKO (punches)	Road FC 46	March 10, 2018	1	3:06	Seoul, South Korea	Return to Bantamweight.
Loss	10–7–1	Kai Asakura	KO (knee and punches)	Road FC 37	March 11, 2017	1	0:29	Seoul, South Korea	
Draw	10–6–1	Jo Nam-jin	Draw (unanimous)	Road FC 34	November 19, 2016	3	5:00	Shijiazhuang, China	Flyweight debut.
Win	10–6	Choi Mu-song	Decision (unanimous)	Road FC 31	May 14, 2016	3	5:00	Seoul, South Korea	
Win	9–6	Fumiya Sasaki	TKO (punches)	Road FC 30	April 16, 2016	1	1:34	Beijing, China	
Win	8–6	Kana Hyatt	Decision (unanimous)	Kunlun Fight 38	February 21, 2016	3	5:00	Pattaya, Thailand	
Win	7–6	Kwon Min-seok	Decision (split)	Road FC 28	January 31, 2016	3	5:00	Seoul, South Korea	
Win	6–6	Emil Abbasov	Decision (unanimous)	WLF E.P.I.C. 1	January 13, 2016	3	5:00	Zhengzhou, China	
Win	5–6	Jessie Rafols	Submission (guillotine choke)	Kunlun Fight 31	September 28, 2015	2	N/A	Bangkok, Thailand	
Loss	4–6	Jo Nam-jin	Decision (unanimous)	WBK 4	June 5, 2015	3	5:00	Ningbo, China	
Win	4–5	Stephen Langdown	TKO (punches and soccer kicks)	One Championship 27: Warrior's Quest	May 22, 2015	2	0:51	Kallang, Singapore	
Loss	3–5	Altynbek Bazhimov	Submission (armbar)	Kunlun Fight: Cage Series 2	April 4, 2015	1	2:53	Almaty, Kazakhstan	
Loss	3–4	Zhikang Zhao	Decision (unanimous)	Chinese Kung Fu Championships	December 23, 2014	3	3:00	Qian'an, China	Featherweight bout.
Loss	3–3	Denis Purić	TKO (punches)	Kunlun Fight 13	November 16, 2014	2	2:05	Hohhot, China	
Win	3–2	Chao Huang	Submission (rear-naked choke)	Chinese Kung Fu Championships	November 11, 2014	2	1:44	Qian'an, China	
Loss	2–2	Baasankhuu Damnlanpurev	TKO (punches)	Ranik Ultimate Fighting Federation 13	June 7, 2014	2	2:03	Shanghai, China	Return to Bantamweight.
Win	2–1	Tom Ni	Submission (rear-naked choke)	Ranik Ultimate Fighting Federation 12	March 29, 2014	1	N/A	Shanghai, China	Featherweight debut.
Loss	1–1	Song Yadong	Decision (unanimous)	Ranik Ultimate Fighting Federation 11	November 30, 2013	3	5:00	Shanghai, China	
Win	1–0	Lee Woong-hee	Decision (unanimous)	Real Fight MMA Championship 3	October 20, 2013	2	5:00	Beijing, China	Bantamweight debut.

== See also ==
- List of current UFC fighters
- List of male mixed martial artists
