= Yan Xiaonan =

Chinese mixed martial artist (born 1989)

- Born: June 16, 1989 (age 37); Shenyang, Liaoning, China
- Native name: 闫晓楠
- Other names: Fury
- Height: 5 ft 5 in (1.65 m)
- Weight: 115 lb (52 kg; 8 st 3 lb)
- Division: Strawweight (2010–present); Flyweight (2009–2010)
- Reach: 63 in (160 cm)
- Fighting out of: Beijing, China
- Team: China Top Team; Extreme Sanda; Team Alpha Male (2021–present)
- Teachers: Sanda: Zhao Xuejun; BJJ: Ruy Menezes
- Rank: Blue belt in Brazilian Jiu-Jitsu under Urijah Faber
- Years active: 2009–present

Mixed martial arts record
- Total: 26
- Wins: 19
- By knockout: 8
- By submission: 1
- By decision: 10
- Losses: 6
- By knockout: 2
- By submission: 1
- By decision: 3
- No contests: 1

Other information
- Mixed martial arts record from Sherdog

Yan Xiaonan (born June 16, 1989) is a Chinese professional mixed martial artist. She currently competes in the women's Strawweight division of the Ultimate Fighting Championship (UFC). As of October 24, 2026, she is #11 in the Meta UFC women's strawweight rankings.

== Background ==
Yan's background is in Sanda. Yan attended Xi'an Sports University and was introduced to an MMA program by her coach Zhao Xuejun in 2009. At the Xi'an Sports University, Yan continued her practice in Sanda. It wasn't until 2015 that Yan switched over to MMA.

== Mixed martial arts career ==
=== Early career ===
Yan began training martial arts at the age of 13. She started her professional MMA career in 2009 and she has fought in various promotions, most notably Road Fighting Championship. She amassed a record of 9–1 (1 NC), before signing with the UFC.

=== Ultimate Fighting Championship ===
Yan was the first Chinese female fighter signed by UFC.

Yan made her UFC debut on November 25, 2017, against Kailin Curran at UFC Fight Night 122. She won the fight via unanimous decision.

Her next fight came on June 23, 2018, at UFC Fight Night 132 against Nadia Kassem; however she was replaced by Viviane Pereira due to injury. She won the fight via unanimous decision.

Yan faced Syuri Kondo on November 24, 2018, at UFC Fight Night 141. She won the fight via unanimous decision.

Yan was expected to face Felice Herrig on June 8, 2019, at UFC 238. However, on April 30, 2019, it was reported that Herrig suffered from a torn ACL and withdrew from the event. Herrig was replaced by Angela Hill. Yan won the fight by unanimous decision.

Yan was scheduled to face Ashley Yoder on October 26, 2019, at UFC Fight Night 162. However, Yan pulled out of the fight in late-September citing a foot injury. She was replaced by Randa Markos.

Yan faced Karolina Kowalkiewicz on February 22, 2020, at UFC Fight Night 168. She won the fight by unanimous decision.

Yan talked of difficulty leading up to the Kowalkiewicz fight due to the outbreak of the COVID-19 pandemic in China. She and her team moved her camp to Thailand to train for the fight.

Yan was scheduled to face Cláudia Gadelha on September 27, 2020 at UFC 253, but a knee injury sustained by Gadelha ruled her out of the bout. The pair was rescheduled to UFC on ESPN: Santos vs. Teixeira on November 7, 2020, instead. As opposed to her last camp where Yan was forced to move around three times, Yan says that the pandemic situation in China is completely under control and the fight camp for Gadelha was normal. She won the fight by unanimous decision.

Yan faced former UFC Women's Strawweight champion Carla Esparza on May 22, 2021, at UFC Fight Night 188. For her camp with Esparza, Yan has spent her camp splitting time between the UFC Performance Institute in Shanghai and Las Vegas. She lost the bout via TKO after being dominated on the ground throughout the bout.

Yan faced Marina Rodriguez on March 5, 2022, at UFC 272. She lost the fight via split decision.

Yan faced Mackenzie Dern at UFC Fight Night 211. She won the bout via majority decision.

As the first bout of her new six-fight contract, Yan faced former UFC Women's Strawweight champion Jéssica Andrade on May 6, 2023, at UFC 288. She won the fight via knockout in the first round.

Yan faced Zhang Weili for the UFC Women's Strawweight Championship on April 13, 2024, at UFC 300. She lost the bout by unanimous decision.

Yan faced Tabatha Ricci on November 23, 2024, at UFC Fight Night 248. She won the fight by unanimous decision.

Yan faced Virna Jandiroba on April 12, 2025 at UFC 314. She lost the fight by unanimous decision.

Yan faced Denise Gomes on August 30, 2026, at UFC Fight Night 286. She lost the fight by knockout at the end of the first round.

== Championships and accomplishments ==
- Ultimate Fighting Championship
  - Performance of the Night (One time) vs. Jéssica Andrade
  - Tied (Carla Esparza, Tatiana Suarez & Loopy Godínez) for the second longest win streak in UFC Women's Strawweight division history (6)
  - Seventh most significant strikes landed in UFC Women's Strawweight division history (821)
  - Most significant head strikes landed in a UFC Women's Strawweight bout (115) (vs. Syuri Kondo)
  - UFC.com Awards
    - 2024: Ranked #9 Fight of the Year vs. Zhang Weili

== Mixed martial arts record ==
Professional record breakdown
26 matches	19 wins	6 losses
By knockout	8	2
By submission	1	1
By decision	10	3
No contests	1	

Res.	Record	Opponent	Method	Event	Date	Round	Time	Location	Notes
Loss	19–6 (1)	Denise Gomes	KO (elbow and punches)	UFC Fight Night: Nurmagomedov vs. Song	August 29, 2026	1	4:49	Shanghai, China	
Loss	19–5 (1)	Virna Jandiroba	Decision (unanimous)	UFC 314	April 12, 2025	3	5:00	Miami, Florida, United States	
Win	19–4 (1)	Tabatha Ricci	Decision (unanimous)	UFC Fight Night: Yan vs. Figueiredo	November 23, 2024	3	5:00	Macau SAR, China	
Loss	18–4 (1)	Zhang Weili	Decision (unanimous)	UFC 300	April 13, 2024	5	5:00	Las Vegas, Nevada, United States	For the UFC Women's Strawweight Championship.
Win	18–3 (1)	Jéssica Andrade	KO (punches)	UFC 288	May 6, 2023	1	2:20	Newark, New Jersey, United States	Performance of the Night.
Win	17–3 (1)	Mackenzie Dern	Decision (majority)	UFC Fight Night: Dern vs. Yan	October 1, 2022	5	5:00	Las Vegas, Nevada, United States	
Loss	16–3 (1)	Marina Rodriguez	Decision (split)	UFC 272	March 5, 2022	3	5:00	Las Vegas, Nevada, United States	
Loss	16–2 (1)	Carla Esparza	TKO (punches)	UFC Fight Night: Font vs. Garbrandt	May 22, 2021	2	2:58	Las Vegas, Nevada, United States	
Win	16–1 (1)	Cláudia Gadelha	Decision (unanimous)	UFC on ESPN: Santos vs. Teixeira	November 7, 2020	3	5:00	Las Vegas, Nevada, United States	
Win	15–1 (1)	Karolina Kowalkiewicz	Decision (unanimous)	UFC Fight Night: Felder vs. Hooker	February 23, 2020	3	5:00	Auckland, New Zealand	
Win	14–1 (1)	Angela Hill	Decision (unanimous)	UFC 238	June 8, 2019	3	5:00	Chicago, Illinois, United States	
Win	13–1 (1)	Syuri Kondo	Decision (unanimous)	UFC Fight Night: Blaydes vs. Ngannou 2	November 24, 2018	3	5:00	Beijing, China	
Win	12–1 (1)	Viviane Pereira	Decision (unanimous)	UFC Fight Night: Cowboy vs. Edwards	June 23, 2018	3	5:00	Kallang, Singapore	
Win	11–1 (1)	Kailin Curran	Decision (unanimous)	UFC Fight Night: Bisping vs. Gastelum	November 25, 2017	3	5:00	Shanghai, China	
NC	10–1 (1)	Emi Fujino	NC (accidental clash of heads)	Road FC 34	November 19, 2016	1	2:48	Shijiazhuang, China	Accidental clash of heads rendered Fujino unable to continue.
Win	10–1	Luo Xuanzhen	Submission (armbar)	Zhenghan Wind Cup 2016	June 26, 2016	1	N/A	Beijing, China	
Win	9–1	Lim Seo-hee	TKO (side kick and punch)	Road FC 30	April 16, 2016	1	3:28	Beijing, China	
Win	8–1	Omnia Gamal	TKO (punches)	International Wushu FC: Changbai Mountain Heroes List	January 31, 2016	1	0:23	Jilin, China	
Win	7–1	Nam Ye-hyun	Decision (unanimous)	Road FC 27	December 26, 2015	2	5:00	Shanghai, China	
Win	6–1	Bayarmaa Munkhgerel	KO (punch)	Zhong Wu Fight Night 2015	October 30, 2015	1	2:34	Beijing, China	
Win	5–1	Dolores Meek	TKO (punches)	URCC 26	July 15, 2015	1	3:25	Angeles City, Philippines	
Win	4–1	Wang Xiaoying	TKO (punches)	Xian Sports University: Ultimate Wrestle	October 30, 2010	2	0:29	Guangzhou, China	
Loss	3–1	Karina Hallinan	Submission (rear-naked choke)	Martial Combat 10	September 16, 2010	1	3:29	Sentosa, Singapore	Flyweight bout.
Win	3–0	Gina Iniong	Decision (unanimous)	Martial Combat 6	July 15, 2010	3	5:00	Sentosa, Singapore	Strawweight debut.
Win	2–0	Jin Tang	TKO (stomps and punches)	Xian Sports University: Ultimate Wrestle	November 21, 2009	1	0:29	Guangzhou, China	
Win	1–0	Unknown Fighter	TKO (punches)	Xian Sports University: Ultimate Wrestle	November 8, 2008	1	N/A	Guangzhou, China	Flyweight debut.

== See also ==
- List of current UFC fighters
- List of female mixed martial artists
