= 2016 in Road FC =

Mixed martial arts events

Information
- Promotion: Road Fighting Championship
- First date: January 31, 2016
- Last date: December 10, 2016

Events
- Total events: 8

Fights
- Total fights: 98
- Title fights: 7

Chronology
2015 in Road FC	2016 in Road FC	2017 in Road FC

The year 2016 was the 7th year in the history of the Road Fighting Championship, an MMA promotion based in South Korea. 2016 started with Road FC 028 and ended with Road FC 035.

== List of events ==
#	Event title	Main event	Date	Arena	Location
8	Road FC 035	Kwon vs. Sasaki	December 10, 2016	Jangchung Gymnasium	(South Korea) Seoul
7	Road FC 034	Choi vs. Kazgan	November 19, 2016	Hebei Gymnasium	(China) Shijiazhuang
6	Road FC 033	Mo vs. Choi	September 24, 2016	Jangchung Gymnasium	(South Korea) Seoul
5	Road FC 032	Aorigele vs. Sapp	July 2, 2016	Hunan International Conference & Exhibition Center	(China) Changsha
4	Road FC 031	Lee vs. Roop	May 14, 2016	Jangchung Gymnasium	(South Korea) Seoul
3	Road FC 030: in China	Choi vs. Aorigele	April 16, 2016	Workers' Stadium	(China) Beijing
2	Road FC 029	Choi vs. Sandro	March 12, 2016	Wonju Chiak Gymnasium	(South Korea) Wonju, Gangwon
1	Road FC 028	Cha vs. Fukuda	January 31, 2016	Jangchung Gymnasium	(South Korea) Seoul

== Road FC 035 ==
Road FC 035

Information
- Promotion: Road Fighting Championship
- Date: December 10, 2016
- Venue: Jangchung Gymnasium
- City: (South Korea) Seoul

Event chronology
Road FC 034	Road FC 035	Road FC 036

Xiaomi Road FC 035 was an MMA event held by Road FC on December 10, 2016, at the Jangchung Gymnasium in Seoul, South Korea.

=== Results ===
Main card
Weight class				Method	Round	Time	Notes
Welterweight	(Japan) Tetsuo Kondo	def.	(South Korea) Bo Sung Kim	TKO (injury to eye)	1	2:35	(Note: Road FC Special Welterweight Division Match)
Lightweight	(South Korea) A Sol Kwon (c)	def.	(Japan) Shinji Sasaki	TKO (punches)	1	3:37	(Note: For the Road FC Lightweight Championship)
Openweight	(United States) Mighty Mo (c)	def.	(Brazil) Carlos Toyota	KO (punch)	1	1:10	(Note: For the Road FC Openweight Championship)
Middleweight	(South Korea) Jung Hwan Cha (c)	def.	(South Korea) Young Choi	TKO (punches)	4	2:40	(Note: For the Road FC Middletweight Championship)
Bantamweight	(South Korea) Soo Chul Kim	def.	(Japan) Shunichi Shimizu	Submission (armbar)	2	3:49
Lightweight	(Brazil) Bruno Miranda	def.	(South Korea) Seung Yeon Kim	TKO (punches)	1	2:59
Lightweight	(Mongolia) Nandin-Erdene	def.	(South Korea) Won Sik Park	TKO (punches)	1	1:03
Welterweight	(South Korea) Eun Soo Lee	def.	(China) Peng Yang	TKO (punches)	1	2:30
Young Guns 031
Weight class				Method	Round	Time	Notes
Featherweight	(South Korea) Hyung Geun Park	def.	(South Korea) Hyung Soo Kim	Decision (1-1)	2	5:00
Lightweight	(South Korea) Dae Sung Park	def.	(South Korea) Kyung Pyo Kim	Decision (2-1)	2	5:00
Featherweight	(South Korea) Se Young Kim	def.	(China) Junkai Yang	Submission (rear naked choke)	1	4:32
Featherweight	(South Korea) Jung Young Lee	def.	(South Korea) Ho Jun Kim	Decision (2-1)	2	5:00
Flyweight	(Japan) Deyu Wang	def.	(South Korea) Yeon Soo Kang	KO (head kick)	1	1:18
Light heavyweight	(South Korea) Kyu Hyung Kim	def.	(Japan) Hisanari Tamaki	Decision (3-0)	2	5:00
Flyweight	(South Korea) Woo Jae Kim	def.	(South Korea) Dong Hyuk Ko	Decision (3-0)	2	5:00

== Road FC 034 ==
Road FC 034

Information
- Promotion: Road Fighting Championship
- Date: November 19, 2016
- Venue: Hebei Gymnasium
- City: (China) Shijiazhuang

Event chronology
Road FC 033	Road FC 034	Road FC 035

Xiaomi Road FC 034 was an MMA event held by Road FC on November 19, 2016, at the Hebei Gymnasium in Shijiazhuang, China.

=== Results ===
Main card
Weight class				Method	Round	Time	Notes
Featherweight	(South Korea) Mu Gyeom Choi (c)	def.	(Turkey) Murat Kazgan	TKO (retirement)	1	5:00	(Note: For the Road FC Featherweight Championship)
Openweight	(China) Aorigele	def.	(Japan) Yusuke Kawaguchi	TKO (punches)	1	2:38
Woman's Strawweight	(China) Xiaonan Yan	vs.	(Japan) Emi Fujino	NC (Fujino cut by clash of heads)	1	2:13
Welterweight	(Russia) Elnur Agaev	def.	(China) Kenan Song	Decision (3-0)	3	5:00
Openweight	(South Korea) Gun Oh Shim	def.	(China) Zhenlin Hou	Decision (3-0)	2	5:00
-100 kg Catchweight	(South Korea) Dae Sung Kim	def.	(China) Jianjun Zhang	Submission (rear naked choke)	1	3:19
Flyweight	(China) Alateng Heili	vs.	(South Korea) Nam Jin Jo	Draw (0-0)	3	5:00
Welterweight	(China) Xin Dong	vs.	(South Korea) In Jae La	Draw (0-0)	3	5:00
Young Guns 030
Weight class				Method	Round	Time	Notes
Flyweight	(China) Haobin Ma	def.	(South Korea) Hyo Ryong Kim	Decision (3-0)	2	5:00
Featherweight	(South Korea) Jung Gi Hong	def.	(China) Burigede Alateng	Decision (3-0)	2	5:00
Lightweight	(Mongolia) Amartuvshin Khuukhenkhuu	def.	(Brazil) Rodrigo Caporal	Decision (3-0)	2	5:00	(Note: China Trials For Road FC $1 Million Lightweight Tournament)
Lightweight	(China) Habiti Tuerxunbieke	def.	(China) Liu Xiaoyang	Submission (armbar)	2	3:15	(Note: China Trials For Road FC $1 Million Lightweight Tournament)
Lightweight	(China) Zhenyue Huang	def.	(China) Changzhao Yu	Decision (3-0)	2	5:00	(Note: China Trials For Road FC $1 Million Lightweight Tournament)
Lightweight	(China) Lianru Shang	def.	(China) Bahetihan Nuerdebieke	TKO (punches)	1	1:22	(Note: China Trials For Road FC $1 Million Lightweight Tournament)

== Road FC 033 ==
Road FC 033

Information
- Promotion: Road Fighting Championship
- Date: September 24, 2016
- Venue: Jangchung Gymnasium
- City: (South Korea) Seoul

Event chronology
Road FC 032	Road FC 033	Road FC 034

Xiaomi Road FC 033 was an MMA event held by Road FC on September 24, 2016, at the Jangchung Arena in Seoul, South Korea.

=== Results ===
Main card
Weight class				Method	Round	Time	Notes
Openweight	(United States) Mighty Mo	def.	(South Korea) Hong Man Choi	KO (punch)	1	4:06	(Note: For the inaugural Road FC Openweight Championship)
Featherweight	(Japan) Hiroto Uesako	def.	(South Korea) Young Gi Hong	TKO (Knee & punches)	1	0:31
-72.5 kg Catchweight	(Japan) Shinji Sasaki	def.	(Brazil) Bruno Miranda	Submission (triangle choke)	2	4:50
Bantamweight	(South Korea) Min Woo Kim	def.	(Japan) Yuta Nezu	TKO (punches)	1	0:19
Lightweight	(South Korea) Won Sik Park	def.	(Japan) Ukyo Abe	TKO (punches)	1	0:41
Lightweight	(Mongolia) Nandin-Erdene	def.	(South Korea) Won Bin Ki	TKO (punches)	1	1:17
Woman's -54 kg Catchweight	(China) Heqin Lin	vs.	(South Korea) Hae In Kim	Draw (0-1)	2	5:00
Middleweight	(South Korea) Nae Chul Kim	def.	(South Korea) Jung Kyo Park	Decision (3-0)	3	5:00
Young Guns 029
Weight class				Method	Round	Time	Notes
-63 kg Catchweight	(South Korea) Dae Young Jang	def.	(South Korea) Yong Geun Kim	Decision (3-0)	2	5:00
-64 kg Catchweight	(South Korea) Ik Hwan Jang	def.	(China) Junkai Yang	TKO (body kick)	1	3:12
Featherweight	(South Korea) Se Young Kim	def.	(South Korea) Hoo Sun Lee	Decision (3-0)	2	5:00
Featherweight	(South Korea) Jung Young Lee	def.	(South Korea) Kyung Yui Cho	Submission (armbar)	1	0:18
Middleweight	(South Korea) Ji Hoon Kim	def.	(South Korea) Jae Sung Oh	Decision (2-1)	2	5:00
Flyweight	(South Korea) Kyu Hwa Kim	def.	(South Korea) Tae Kyun Kim	Decision (3-0)	2	5:00
Welterweight	(United Kingdom) Stuart Gooch	def.	(South Korea) Won Jun Choi	Submission (rear naked choke)	2	2:19

==== Tournament Pair Assignment for selecting the first Champion in Road FC Open-weight Division ====
Quarter-finals; Road FC 027 (2015-12-26)
(South Korea) Hyun Man Myung	TKO
(China) Lingyu Liang	1R
(United States) Mighty Mo	TKO
(South Korea) Mu Bae Choi	1R
(China) Aorigele	TKO
(South Korea) Jae Hoon Kim	1R
(South Korea) Hong Man Choi	TKO
(China) Quanchao Luo	1R

Semi-finals; Road FC 030 (2016-04-16)
(South Korea) Hyun Man Myung	3R
(United States) Mighty Mo	SUB
(China) Aorigele	1R
(South Korea) Hong Man Choi	KO

Final; Road FC 033 (2016-09-24)
(United States) Mighty Mo	KO
(South Korea) Hong Man Choi	1R

== Road FC 032 ==
Road FC 032

Information
- Promotion: Road Fighting Championship
- Date: July 2, 2016
- Venue: Hunan International Convention & Exhibition Center
- City: (China) Changsha

Event chronology
Road FC 031	Road FC 032	Road FC 033

Xiaomi Road FC 032 was an MMA event held by Road FC on July 2, 2016, at the Hunan International Conference & Exhibition Center in Changsha, China.

=== Results ===
Part 2
Weight class				Method	Round	Time	Notes
Openweight	(China) Aorigele	def.	(United States) Bob Sapp	TKO (punches)	1	0:35
Woman's -56 kg Catchweight	(China) Heqin Lin	def.	(Japan) Nori Date	Decision (3-0)	2	5:00
Featherweight	(South Korea) Soo Chul Kim	def.	(China) Zhumabek Tursyn	TKO (punches)	1	2:51
Woman's -46.5 kg Catchweight	(South Korea) Ye Ji Lee	def.	(Japan) Hana Date	Decision (2-0)	2	5:00
Heavyweight	(China) Zhenlin Hou	def.	(South Korea) Byung In Kwak	TKO (punches)	1	2:16
Part 1
Weight class				Method	Round	Time	Notes
Lightweight	(China) Albert Cheng	def.	(South Korea) Hyung Seok Lee	Decision (3-0)	2	5:00
Flyweight	(Japan) Kai Asakura	def.	(China) Liu Xiaoyang	Submission (rear naked choke)	1	1:53
Bantamweight	(South Korea) Ok Myung Kim	def.	(China) Jianwei He	Decision (3-0)	2	5:00
Featherweight	(China) Zhenyue Huang	def.	(South Korea) Doo Seok Oh	Decision (3-0)	2	5:00

== Road FC 031 ==
Road FC 031

Information
- Promotion: Road Fighting Championship
- Date: May 14, 2016
- Venue: Jangchung Gymnasium
- City: (South Korea) Seoul

Event chronology
Road FC 030	Road FC 031	Road FC 032

Xiaomi Road FC 031 was an MMA event held by Road FC on May 14, 2016, at the Jangchung Gymnasium in Seoul, South Korea.

=== Results ===
Main card
Weight class				Method	Round	Time	Notes
Featherweight	(South Korea) Yoon Jun Lee	def.	(United States) George Roop	TKO (Leg Injury)	1	1:15
Openweight	(Japan) Kiyoshi Kuwabara	def.	(South Korea) A Sol Kwon	KO (punch)	1	0:18
Middleweight	(South Korea) Young Choi	def.	(South Korea) Dong Sik Yoon	KO (punch)	2	2:38
-69 kg Catchweight	(Brazil) Bruno Miranda	def.	(South Korea) Doo Je Jung	Submission (guillotine choke)	1	1:06
Woman's Strawweight	(Japan) Emi Fujino	def.	(South Korea) Yoon Ha Hong	Submission (rear naked choke)	1	0:47
Bantamweight	(China) Alateng Heili	def.	(South Korea) Mu Song Choi	Decision (3-0)	2	5:00
Young Guns 028
Weight class				Method	Round	Time	Notes
Lightweight	(South Korea) Kyung Pyo Kim	def.	(China) jietebusibai Haolan	Submission (rear naked choke)	2	2:00
Featherweight	(South Korea) Kyung Chul Min	def.	(South Korea) Won Gi Kim	TKO (punches)	2	1:40
Lightweight	(South Korea) Won Bin Ki	def.	(South Korea) Byung Ha Lim	TKO (punches)	1	3:07
Featherweight	(South Korea) Young Sam Jung	def.	(South Korea) Jae Woong Yang	Decision (2-1)	2	5:00
Lightweight	(South Korea) Je Il Jung	def.	(South Korea) Young Jun Cho	Decision (3-0)	2	5:00
Flyweight	(South Korea) Deyu Wang	def.	(South Korea) Noh Myung Park	Submission (rear naked choke)	1	4:01

== Road FC 030: in China ==
Road FC 030

Information
- Promotion: Road Fighting Championship
- Date: March 12, 2016
- Venue: Worker's Stadium
- City: (China) Beijing

Event chronology
Road FC 029	Road FC 030	Road FC 031

Xiaomi Road FC 030 : in China was an MMA event held by Road FC on April 16, 2016, at the Workers' Stadium in Beijing, China.

=== Results ===
Part 2
Weight class				Method	Round	Time	Notes
Openweight	(South Korea) Hong Man Choi	def.	(China) Aorigele	KO (punch)	1	1:36	(Note: Road FC Openweight tournament semi-finals)
Woman's Strawweight	(China) Xiaonan Yan	def.	(South Korea) So Hee Lim	TKO (side kick & punch)	1	4:48
Openweight	(United States) Mighty Mo	def.	(South Korea) Hyun Man Myung	Submission (neck crank)	3	1:12	(Note: Road FC Openweight tournament semi-finals)
Bantamweight	(China) Alateng Heili	def.	(Japan) Fumiya Sasaki	TKO (punches)	1	4:04
Featherweight	(Russia) Alexey Polpudnikov	def.	(China) Nannan He	Submission (rear naked choke)	1	2:05
Part 1
Weight class				Method	Round	Time	Notes
Lightweight	(China) Albert Cheng	def.	(Japan) Yuki Ishihara	Decision (3-0)	2	5:00
Featherweight	(China) Junkai Yang	def.	(South Korea) Doo Seok Oh	TKO (punches)	1	0:18
Bantamweight	(South Korea) Ik Hwan Jang	def.	(China) Xiaoliang Zheng	Submission (armbar)	2	0:36
Featherweight	(South Korea) Se Young Kim	def.	(China) Lianru Shang	Decision (3-0)	2	5:00

== Road FC 029 ==
Road FC 029

Information
- Promotion: Road Fighting Championship
- Date: March 12, 2016
- Venue: Wonju Chiak Gymnasium
- City: (South Korea) Wonju, Gangwon

Event chronology
Road FC 028	Road FC 029	Road FC 030

Xiaomi Road FC 029 was an MMA event held by Road FC on March 12, 2016, at the Wonju Chiak Gymnasium in Wonju, Gangwon, South Korea.

=== Results ===
Main card
Weight class				Method	Round	Time	Notes
Featherweight	(South Korea) Mu Gyeom Choi (c)	def.	(Brazil) Marlon Sandro	Decision (3-0)	3	5:00	(Note: For the Road FC Featherweight Championship)
Bantamweight	(South Korea) Soo Chul Kim	def.	(United States) Marcus Brimage	Decision (3-0)	3	5:00
Openweight	(Brazil) Carlos Toyota	def.	(South Korea) Gun Oh Shim	TKO (punches)	1	0:17
Bantamweight	(South Korea) Min Woo Kim	def.	(South Korea) Je Hoon Moon	Decision (3-0)	3	5:00
Women's -46 kg Catchweight	(South Korea) Ye Ji Lee	def.	(Japan) Natsuki Shimomakise	Submission (armbar)	1	4:19
-72 kg Catchweight	(South Korea) Shinji Sasaki	def.	(South Korea) Won Sik Park	TKO (punches)	1	0:40
Young Guns 027
Weight class				Method	Round	Time	Notes
Welterweight	(Russia) Gennadiy Kovalev	def.	(South Korea) In Ho Cha	TKO (punches)	1	2:15
Flyweight	(South Korea) Yeon Soo Kang]	def.	(South Korea) Bon Hyuk Gu	Decision (3-0)	2	5:00
Welterweight	(Mongolia) Batmunkh Burenzorig	def.	(South Korea) Won Jun Choi	Decision (3-0)	2	5:00
Middleweight	(South Korea) In Jae La	def.	(South Korea) Young Jun Jeon	Decision (3-0)	2	5:00
Featherweight	(South Korea) Hoo Sun Lee	def.	(South Korea) Jong Tae Hong	KO (punch)	1	0:41
Flyweight	(South Korea) Tae Kyun Kim	def.	(South Korea) Gi Won Ko	Decision (3-0)	2	5:00
Welterweight	(South Korea) Hyun Min Kim	vs.	(South Korea) Jin Kyu Lee	NC (Kim's eye injury)	1	3:41

== Road FC 028 ==
Road FC 028

Information
- Promotion: Road Fighting Championship
- Date: January 31, 2016
- Venue: Jangchung Gymnasium
- City: (South Korea) Seoul

Event chronology
Road FC 027	Road FC 028	Road FC 029

Xiaomi Road FC 028 was an MMA event held by Road FC on January 31, 2016, at the Jangchung Gymnasium in Seoul, South Korea.

=== Results ===
Main card
Weight class				Method	Round	Time	Notes
Middleweight	(South Korea) Jung Hwan Cha	def.	(Japan) Riki Fukuda (c)	KO (punch)	2	2:36	(Note: For the Road FC Middleweight Championship)
Bantamweight	(South Korea) Je Hoon Moon	def.	(Japan) Yuta Nezu	Decision (2-1)	3	5:00
Bantamweight	(China) Alateng Heili	def.	(South Korea) Min Seok Kwon	Decision (2-1)	3	5:00
Women's Atomweight	(South Korea) Jeong Eun Park	def.	(China) Xiaoni Liu	Submission (arm triangle choke)	2	2:24
Featherweight	(South Korea) Hyung Soo Kim	def.	(South Korea) Byung Ok Cho	Decision (3-0)	2	5:00
Young Guns 026
Weight class				Method	Round	Time	Notes
Featherweight	(South Korea) Tae Un Ha	def.	(China) Bo Yan	Submission (arm triangle choke)	1	0:48
Lightweight	(South Korea) Chan Sol Park	def.	(China) Kai Lu	Decision (3-0)	2	5:00
Middleweight	(South Korea) Won Jun Choi	def.	(South Korea) In Yong Choi	TKO (punches)	1	1:05
Bantamweight	(South Korea) Jin Soo Seo	def.	(South Korea) Ho Young Yoon	Decision (3-0)	2	5:00
Featherweight	(South Korea) Soo Wan Park	def.	(South Korea) Yo Seob Park	Decision (3-0)	2	5:00
Bantamweight	(South Korea) Yoon Jin Lee	def.	(South Korea) Yong Geun Kim	Decision (3-0)	2	5:00

== See also ==
- List of Road FC events
- List of Road FC champions
- List of current Road FC fighters
- List of current mixed martial arts champions
