= List of Road FC champions =

List of Road FC (Road Fighting Championship) champions is a list of fighters who have won Road FC championships.

== Current champions ==
Men
Division	Champion	Since	Defenses
Heavyweight	(South Korea) Tae In Kim	April 13, 2024	1
Light Heavyweight	(South Korea) Tae In Kim	December 18, 2022	0
Middleweight	(South Korea) In Su Hwang	July 3, 2021	1
Welterweight	(South Korea) Tae Young Yoon	December 7, 2025	0
Lightweight	(Bahrain) Kamil Magomedov	June 28, 2025	0
Featherweight	(Kyrgyzstan) Yryskeldi Duysheev	December 7, 2025	0
Bantamweight	(South Korea) Soo Chul Kim	March 15, 2026	0
Bantamweight	(South Korea) Hyun Woo Kim (interim)	August 29, 2026	0
Flyweight	Vacant	November 1, 2026	N/A

Women
Division	Champion	Since	Defenses
Atomweight	(South Korea) Jeong Eun Park	May 30, 2026	0

== Men's championship history ==
=== Openweight championship ===
no weight limit

No.	Name	Event	Date	Reign (total)	Defenses
1	(American Samoa) Mighty Mo def. Hong Man Choi	Road FC 033; Seoul, South Korea	September 24, 2016	723 days	1. def. Carlos Toyota at Road FC 035 on December 10, 2016; 2. def. Dong Kook Kang at Road FC 040 on July 15, 2017
Mo vacated the title in 2018

=== Heavyweight championship ===
~ 120 kg (264.6 lb)

No.	Name	Event	Date	Reign (total)	Defenses
1	(South Korea) Tae In Kim def. Taisei Sekino	Road FC 068; Seoul, South Korea	April 13, 2024	933 days (incumbent)	1. def. Taisei Sekino at Road FC 076 on March 16, 2026

=== Light Heavyweight championship ===
~ 93 kg (205.3 lb)

No.	Name	Event	Date	Reign (total)	Defenses
1	(South Korea) Tae In Kim def. Daniel Gomez	Road FC 062; Seoul, South Korea	December 18, 2022	1415 days (incumbent)	

=== Middleweight championship ===
~ 84 kg (185.2 lb)

No.	Name	Event	Date	Reign (total)	Defenses
1	(Japan) Shungo Oyama def. Hye Suk Son	Road FC 006; Seoul, South Korea	February 5, 2012	294 days	
2	(South Korea) Eun Soo Lee def. Shungo Oyama	Road FC 010; Busan, South Korea	November 24, 2012	585 days	
Lee vacated the title in July 2014 after dropping down to welterweight.
3	(Japan) Riki Fukuda def. Uh Jin Jeon	Road FC 024; Tokyo, Japan	July 25, 2015	190 days	
4	(South Korea) Jung Hwan Cha	Road FC 028; Seoul, South Korea	January 31, 2016	890 days	1. def. Young Choi at Road FC 035 on December 10, 2016
-	(South Korea) Young Choi def. Hoon Kim for interim title	Road FC 043; Seoul, South Korea	October 28, 2017	254 days	
Cha was stripped of the title in July 2018 due to injury. Choi was promoted to undisputed status.
5	(South Korea) Young Choi		July 9, 2018	20 days	
6	(South Korea) In Jae La def. Young Choi	Road FC 048; Wonju, South Korea	July 28, 2018	323 days	
7	(South Korea) Hae Jun Yang def. In Jae La	Road FC 054; Wonju, South Korea	June 15, 2019	683 days	
Title was left vacant in April 2021, following Yang's retirement.
8	(South Korea) In Su Hwang def. Il Hak Oh	Road FC 058; Changwon, South Korea	July 3, 2021	1948 days (incumbent)	1. def. interim champion Dong Hwan Lim at Road FC 072 on March 16, 2025
-	(South Korea) Dong Hwan Lim def. In Jae La for interim title	Road FC 071; Wonju, South Korea	December 29, 2024	—	

=== Welterweight championship ===
~ 77 kg (169.8 lb)

No.	Name	Event	Date	Reign (total)	Defenses
1	(South Korea) Tae Young Yoon def. Quemuel Ottoni	Road FC 075; Seoul, South Korea	December 7, 2025	330 days (incumbent)	

=== Lightweight championship ===
~ 70 kg (154.3 lb). From 2023 to 2025, the championship is awarded to fighters who won the Lightweight Grand Prix.

No.	Name	Event	Date	Reign (total)	Defenses
1	(South Korea) Yui Chul Nam def. Takasuke Kume	Road FC 011; Seoul, South Korea	April 13, 2013	295 days	1. def. Takasuke Kume at Road FC 013 on October 12, 2013
Nam vacated the title in February 2014 after signing with Ultimate Fighting Championship.
2	(South Korea) A Sol Kwon def. Takasuke Kume	Road FC 017; Seoul, South Korea	August 17, 2014	1735 days	1. def. Kwang Hee Lee at Road FC 022 on March 21, 2015; 2. def. Shinji Sasaki at Road FC 035 on December 10, 2016
3	(France) Mansour Barnaoui	Road FC 053; Jeju, South Korea	May 18, 2019	594 days	
Barnaoui terminated his contract and relinquished his title in January 2021, due to the unfavourable circumstances of COVID-19.
4	(South Korea) Si Won Park def. Seung Mo Park	Road FC 061; Wonju, South Korea	July 23, 2022	335 days	1. def. Je Woo Yeo at Road FC 062 on December 18, 2022
Park relinquished the championship at the start of the 2023 Road FC Lightweight Grand Prix on June 23.
5	(Russia) Artur Soloviev def. Nandin-Erdene Munguntsooj	Road FC 066; Wonju, South Korea	October 29, 2023	307 days	
Soloviev relinquished the championship at the start of the 2024 Road FC Lightweight Grand Prix on August 31 to participate in the event.
6	(Bahrain) Kamil Magomedov def. Nandin-Erdene Munguntsooj	Road FC 073; Seoul, South Korea	June 28, 2025	492 days (incumbent)	

=== Featherweight championship ===
~ 66 kg (145.5 lb)

No.	Name	Event	Date	Reign (total)	Defenses
1	(South Korea) Mu Gyeom Choi def. Bae Yong Kwon	Road FC 014; Seoul, South Korea	February 9, 2014	1728 days	1. def. Doo Won Seo at Road FC 021 on February 1, 2015; 2. def. Marlon Sandro at Road FC 029 on March 12, 2016; 3. def. Murat Kazgan at Road FC 034 on November 19, 2016
2	(South Korea) Jung Young Lee	Road FC 050; Seoul, South Korea	November 3, 2018	1036 days	1. def. Hae Jin Park at Road FC 055 on September 8, 2019
Lee was stripped of the title due to inactivity.
3	(South Korea) Hae Jin Park def. Soo Chul Kim	Road FC 059; Wonju, South Korea	September 4, 2021	252 days	
4	(South Korea) Soo Chul Kim	Road FC 060; Daegu, South Korea	May 14, 2022	93 days	
Kim vacated the title in August 2022 after signing with Rizin FF.
5	(South Korea) Hae Jin Park (2) def. Seung Mo Park	Road FC 062; Seoul, South Korea	December 18, 2022	187 days	
Park relinquished the championship at the start of the 2023 Road FC Lightweight Grand Prix on June 23 to participate in the event.
6	(Kyrgyzstan) Yryskeldi Duysheev def. Shin Haraguchi	Road FC 075; Seoul, South Korea	December 7, 2025	330 days (incumbent)	

=== Bantamweight championship ===
~ 61 kg (134.5 lb 2010–2023, 2026-present), ~63 kg (138.9 lb 2023–2025). From 2023 to 2025, the championship is awarded to fighters who won the Bantamweight Grand Prix.

No.	Name	Event	Date	Reign (total)	Defenses
1	(South Korea) Kyung Ho Kang def. Andrew Leone	Road FC 008; Wonju, South Korea	Jule 16, 2012	16 days	
Kang vacated the title in July 2012 after signing with Ultimate Fighting Championship.
2	(South Korea) Kil Woo Lee def. Min Jong Song	Road FC 012; Wonju, South Korea	June 22, 2013	540 days	
3	(South Korea) Yoon Jun Lee def. Kil Woo Lee	Road FC 020; Seoul, South Korea	December 14, 2014	593 days	1. def. Je Hoon Moon at Road FC 023 on May 2, 2015
Lee vacated the title in July 2016 suffering cerebral infarction.
4	(South Korea) Soo Chul Kim def. Min Woo Kim	Road FC 038; Seoul, South Korea	April 15, 2017	253 days	
Kim vacated the title in December 2017 due to retirement.
5	(South Korea) Min Woo Kim def. Ik Hwan Jang	Road FC 052; Seoul, South Korea	February 23, 2019	927 days	1. def. Ik Hwan Jang at Road FC 056 on Nov 9, 2019
Kim vacated the title in May 2022 to participate in Road to UFC.
6	(South Korea) Je Hoon Moon def. Ik Hwan Jang	Road FC 062; Seoul, South Korea	December 18, 2022	188 days	
Moon vacated the title on June 24, 2023, due to retirement.
7	(South Korea) Soo Chul Kim (2) def. Akira Haraguchi	Road FC 038; Seoul, South Korea	October 29, 2023	307 days	
Kim relinquished the championship at the start of the 2024 Road FC Bantamweight Grand Prix on August 31 to participate in the event.
8	(South Korea) Soo Chul Kim (3) def. Ji Yong Yang	Road FC 076; Seoul, South Korea	March 15, 2026	232 days (incumbent)	
-	(South Korea) Hyun Woo Kim def. Ji Yong Yang for interim title	Road FC 078; Seoul, South Korea	August 29, 2026	65 days (incumbent)	

=== Flyweight championship ===
~ 57 kg (125.7 lb)

No.	Name	Event	Date	Reign (total)	Defenses
1	(South Korea) Nam Jin Jo def. Min Jong Song	Road FC 016; Gumi, South Korea	July 27, 2014	439 days	
-	(South Korea) Min Jong Song def. Takeshi Kasugai for interim title	Road FC 021; Seoul, South Korea	February 1, 2015	250 days	
2	(South Korea) Min Jong Song def. Nam Jin Jo	Road FC 026; Seoul, South Korea	October 9, 2015	1271 days	
Title was left vacant on April 2, 2019, when Song didn't renew his contract with Road FC and signed with One FC.
3	(South Korea) Jung Hyun Lee def. Dong Hyuk Ko	Road FC 072; Seoul, South Korea	March 16, 2025	595 days	1. def. Ye Jun Pyun at Road FC 074 on Sep 27, 2025
Lee vacated the title on November 1, 2026 to fulfill his mandatory military service.

== Women's championship history ==
=== Women's Atomweight championship ===
~ 48 kg (105.8 lb)

No.	Name	Event	Date	Reign (total)	Defenses
1	(South Korea) Seo Hee Ham def. Mina Kurobe	Road FC 039; Seoul, South Korea	June 10, 2017	741 days	1. def. Jinh Yu Frey at Road FC 045 on Dec. 23, 2017; 2. def. Jeong Eun Park at Road FC 051 on Dec. 15, 2018
Ham vacated the title in June 2019 after signing with Rizin FF.
2	(South Korea) Yu Ri Shim def. Jeong Eun Park	Road FC 59; Wonju, South Korea	September 4, 2021	840 days	
Shim vacated the title on December 23, 2023, citing "personal reasons".
-	(South Korea) Jeong Eun Park	Promoted to interim status by the promotion	December 23, 2023	-	
3	(South Korea) Jeong Eun Park def. Seo Young Park	Road FC 77; Seoul, South Korea	May 30, 2026	156 days (incumbent)	

== Tournament winners ==
Road FC held its first tournament in the middleweight division in 2012. Since then, it has held tournaments in the bantamweight, featherweight, lightweight and openweight divisions, which have all led to a championship.

Event	Date	Division	Winner	Runner-up
Road FC 006: Final 4	Feb 5, 2012	Middleweight	(Japan) Shungo Oyama	(South Korea) Hye Seok Son
Road FC 008: Final 4 Bitter Rivals	Jun 16, 2012	Bantamweight	(South Korea) Kyung Ho Kang	(United States) Andrew Leone
Road FC 011	Apr 13, 2013	Lightweight	(South Korea) Yui Chul Nam	(Japan) Takasuke Kume
Road FC 012	Jun 22, 2013	Bantamweight	(South Korea) Kil Woo Lee	(South Korea) Min Jong Song
Road FC 014	Feb 9, 2014	Featherweight	(South Korea) Mu Gyeom Choi	(South Korea) Bae Yong Kwon
Road FC 033	Sep 21, 2016	Openweight	(American Samoa) Mighty Mo	(South Korea) Hong Man Choi
Road FC 052	Feb 23, 2019	Lightweight	(France) Mansour Barnaoui	(Russia) Shamil Zavurov
Road FC 066	Oct 29, 2023	Lightweight	(Russia) Artur Soloviev	(Mongolia) Nandin-Erdene Munguntsooj
Road FC 066	Oct 29, 2023	Bantamweight	(South Korea) Soo Chul Kim	(Japan) Akira Haraguchi
Road FC 073	Jun 28, 2025	Lightweight	(Bahrain) Kamil Magomedov	(Mongolia) Nandin-Erdene Munguntsooj
Road FC 076	Mar 15, 2026	Bantamweight	(South Korea) Soo Chul Kim	(South Korea) Ji Yong Yang

== See also ==
- List of current mixed martial arts champions
- List of Road FC events
- List of current Road FC fighters
- List of Deep champions
- List of Deep Jewels Champions
- List of Pancrase champions
- List of Strikeforce champions
- List of UFC champions
- List of WEC champions
- List of Pride champions
- Mixed martial arts weight classes
