= 2017 in Road FC =

Mixed martial arts events

Information
- Promotion: Road Fighting Championship
- First date: February 11, 2017
- Last date: December 23, 2017

Events
- Total events: 10

Fights
- Total fights: 130
- Title fights: 5

Chronology
| 2016 in Road FC | 2017 in Road FC | 2018 in Road FC |

The year 2017 was the 8th year in the history of the Road Fighting Championship, a mixed martial arts promotion based in South Korea. 2017 started with Road FC 036 and ended with Road FC 045 XX.

== List of events ==
| # | Event title | Main event | Date | Arena | Location |
|---|---|---|---|---|---|
| 10 | Road FC 045 XX | Ham vs. Yu Frey | December 23, 2017 | Convention Centre, Grand Hilton Seoul | (South Korea) Seoul |
| 9 | Road FC 044 | Aorigele vs. Fujita | November 11, 2017 | Hebei Gymnasium | (China) Shijiazhuang, Hebei |
| 8 | Road FC 043 | Choi vs. Kim | October 28, 2017 | Jangchung Gymnasium | (South Korea) Seoul |
| 7 | Road FC 042 x Chungju World Martial Arts Festival | Aorigele vs. Masuda | September 23, 2017 | Chungju World Martial Arts Festival Stadium | (South Korea) Chungju, Chungcheongbuk-do |
| 6 | Road FC 041 | Myung vs. Barnett | August 12, 2017 | Wonju Gymnasium | (South Korea) Wonju, Gangwon-do |
| 5 | Road FC 040 | Mo vs. Kang | July 15, 2017 | Jangchung Gymnasium | (South Korea) Seoul |
| 4 | Road FC 039 | Ham vs. Kurobe | June 10, 2017 | Jangchung Gymnasium | (South Korea) Seoul |
| 3 | Road FC 038 | Kim vs. Kim | April 15, 2017 | Jangchung Gymnasium | (South Korea) Seoul |
| 2 | Road FC 037 XX | Kang vs. Raika | March 11, 2017 | Convention Centre, Grand Hilton Seoul | (South Korea) Seoul |
| 1 | Road FC 036 | Fukuda vs. Kim | February 11, 2017 | Jangchung Gymnasium | (South Korea) Seoul |

== Road FC 045 XX ==
Road FC 045 XX

Information
- Promotion: Road Fighting Championship
- Date: December 23, 2017
- Venue: Convention Centre, Grand Hilton Seoul
- City: (South Korea) Seoul

Event chronology
| Road FC 044 | Road FC 045 XX | Road FC 046 |

Xiaomi Road FC 045 XX was an MMA event held by Road FC on December 23, 2017 at the Convention Centre, Grand Hilton Seoul in Seoul, South Korea. The 2nd event 'Road FC 045 XX' of the all-female MMA league Road FC XX was held on the main card.

=== Results ===
Road FC 045 XX
| Weight class | | | | Method | Round | Time | Notes |
|---|---|---|---|---|---|---|---|
| Women's Atomweight | (South Korea) Seo Hee Ham (c) | def. | (United States) Jinh Yu Frey | TKO (punches) | 1 | 4:40 | (Note: For the Road FC Women's Atomweight Championship) |
| Women's Openweight | (South Korea) Young Ji Kim | def. | (Japan) Yoshiko Hirano | Decision (unanimous) | 2 | 5:00 |
| Women's -50 kg Catchweight | (South Korea) So Hee Lim | def. | (Japan) Miki Araki | Decision (unanimous) | 2 | 5:00 |
| Women's Openweight | (United States) Destanie Yarbrough | def. | (Kyrgyzstan) Begimzhan Kasymova | Decision (unanimous) | 2 | 5:00 |
| Women's Bantamweight | (Hong Kong) Ramona Pascual | def. | (South Korea) Seo Woo Jin | Decision (unanimous) | 2 | 5:00 |
Young Guns 038
| Weight class | | | | Method | Round | Time | Notes |
| -71.5 kg Catchweight | (Kyrgyzstan) Rafael Fiziev | def. | (Mongolia) M. Nandin-Erdene | TKO (head kick & punches) | 1 | 0:58 |
| -72 kg Catchweight | (South Korea) Won Bin Ki | def. | (China) Yinchang Bao | Submission (rear naked choke) | 1 | 2:09 |
| Openweight | (United States) Chris Barnett | def. | (South Korea) Gun Oh Shim | TKO (punches) | 2 | 3:33 |
| Middleweight | (South Korea) In Soo Hwang | def. | (South Korea) Jung Kyo Park | TKO (punches) | 1 | 0:11 |
| Bantamweight | (South Korea) Yi Sak Kim (B) | def. | (South Korea) Dong Soo Seo | Decision (unanimous) | 2 | 5:00 |

== Road FC 044 ==
Road FC 044

Information
- Promotion: Road Fighting Championship
- Date: November 11, 2017
- Venue: Hebei Gymnasium
- City: (China) Shijiazhuang, Hebei

Event chronology
| Road FC 043 | Road FC 044 | Road FC 045 XX |

Xiaomi Road FC 044 was an MMA event held by Road FC on November 11, 2017 at the Hebei Gymnasium in Shijiazhuang, Hebei, China.

=== Results ===
Part 2
| Weight class | | | | Method | Round | Time | Notes |
|---|---|---|---|---|---|---|---|
| Openweight | (China) Aorigele | def. | (Japan) Kazuyuki Fujita | TKO (punches) | 1 | 2:01 |
| Lightweight | (Russia) Shamil Zavurov | def. | (Mongolia) Khuukhenkhuu Amartuvshin | Decision (3-0) | 3 | 5:00 | (Note: Road FC $1 Million Lightweight Tournament Quarter-finals) |
| Lightweight | (Japan) Kota Shimoishi | def. | (China) Yincang Bao | Submission (armbar) | 2 | 4:49 | (Note: Road FC $1 Million Lightweight Tournament Quarter-finals) |
| Lightweight | (Brazil) Ronys Torres | def. | (Brazil) Tom Santos | Submission (armbar) | 1 | 4:17 | (Note: Road FC $1 Million Lightweight Tournament Quarter-finals) |
| Lightweight | (France) Mansour Barnaoui | def. | (Mongolia) Nandin-Erdene | Submission (rear naked choke) | 1 | 2:03 | (Note: Road FC $1 Million Lightweight Tournament Quarter-finals) |
Part 1
| Weight class | | | | Method | Round | Time | Notes |
| -71 kg Catchweight | (China) Shayilan Nuerdanbieke | def. | (Japan) Shunya Imai | TKO (punches) | 1 | 3:39 |
| Openweight | (China) Lahan Wu | def. | (China) Yinchuan Wang | TKO (doctor stop) | 1 | 2:44 |
| Openweight | (China) Anding Ma | def. | (Japan) Kiyoshi Kuwabara | Decision (3-0) | 2 | 5:00 |
| Women's Strawweight | (Japan) Emi Fujino | def. | (Brazil) Aline Sattelmayer | Decision (2-1) | 2 | 5:00 |
| Bantamweight | (China) Ze Wu | def. | (China) Xiaolong Wu | TKO (punches) | 1 | 3:09 |
| Bantamweight | (Japan) Yuta Nezu | vs. | (Mongolia) Baasankhuu Damlanpurev | Draw | 2 | 5:00 |
| Lightweight | (China) Zhenyue Huang | def. | (Japan) Keisuke Iwata | TKO (punches) | 2 | 4:01 |

== Road FC 043 ==
Road FC 043

Information
- Promotion: Road Fighting Championship
- Date: October 28
- Venue: Jangchung Gymnasium
- City: (South Korea) Seoul

Event chronology
| Road FC 042 | Road FC 043 | Road FC 044 |

Xiaomi Road FC 043 was an MMA event held by Road FC on October 28, 2017 at the Jangchung Gymnasium in Seoul, South Korea.

=== Results ===
Main card
| Weight class | | | | Method | Round | Time | Notes |
|---|---|---|---|---|---|---|---|
| Middleweight | (South Korea) Young Choi | def. | (South Korea) Hoon Kim | Decision (3-0) | 3 | 5:00 | (Note: For the Interim Road FC Middleweight Championship) |
| Featherweight | (South Korea) Kil Woo Lee | def. | (Japan) Mikuru Asakura | Decision (3-0) | 3 | 5:00 |
| Lightweight | (South Korea) Yui Chul Nam | def. | (South Korea) Doo Je Jung | TKO (punches) | 1 | 2:49 |
| Lightweight | (South Korea) Seung Yeon Kim | def. | (Russia) Alexander Merezhko | TKO (punches) | 2 | 4:20 | (Note: Reserve Bout for the Road FC $1 Million Lightweight Tournament) |
| Lightweight | (Russia) Arman Tsarukyan | def. | (South Korea) Kyung Pyo Kim | Decision (3-0) | 3 | 5:00 |
| Featherweight | (South Korea) Jung Young Lee | def. | (Brazil) Marcio Cesar | TKO (doctor stoppage) | 2 | 1:44 |
Young Guns 037
| Weight class | | | | Method | Round | Time | Notes |
| Featherweight | (Russia) Evgeniy Ryazanov | def. | (South Korea) Kyung Chul Min | Decision (3-0) | 2 | 5:00 |
| Women's Strawweight | (South Korea) Yoon Ha Hong | def. | (South Korea) Yuri Shim | Decision (3-0) | 2 | 5:00 |
| Flyweight | (South Korea) Sung Jae Kim | def. | (South Korea) Won Hee Jung | Decision (3-0) | 2 | 5:00 |
| Middleweight | (South Korea) In Su Hwang | def. | (Czech Republic) Zdenek Polivka | TKO (punches) | 1 | 2:17 |
| Flyweight | (South Korea) Gi Won Go | def. | (South Korea) Dong Hyeok Ko | Decision (2-1) | 2 | 5:00 |
| Heavyweight | (South Korea) Won Jun Choi | def. | (South Korea) Ho Jun Lee | TKO (punches) | 1 | 1:56 |
| Featherweight | (South Korea) Tae Sung Kim | def. | (South Korea) Kyung Min Min | Submission (rear naked choke) | 2 | 3:32 |

== Road FC 042 x Chungju World Martial Arts Festival ==
Road FC 042 x Chungju World Martial Arts Festival

Information
- Promotion: Road Fighting Championship
- Date: September 23, 2017
- Venue: Chungju World Martial Arts Festival Stadium
- City: (South Korea) Chungju, Chungcheongbuk-do.

Event chronology
| Road FC 041 | Road FC 042 x Chungju World Martial Arts Festival | Road FC 043 |

Xiaomi Road FC 042 x Chungju World Martial Arts Festival was an MMA event held by Road FC on September 23, 2017 at the Chungju World Martial Arts Festival Stadium in Chungju, Chungcheongbuk-do, South Korea.

=== Results ===
Main card
| Weight class | | | | Method | Round | Time | Notes |
|---|---|---|---|---|---|---|---|
| Openweight | (China) Aorigele | def. | (Japan) Yusuke Masuda | TKO (punches) | 3 | 1:52 |
| Middleweight | (Japan) Minowaman | def. | (South Korea) Dong Sik Yoon | TKO (injury) | 2 | 2:26 |
| Openweight | (South Korea) Gun Oh Shim | def. | (South Korea) Chang Hee Kim | TKO (punches) | 2 | 1:18 |
| Lightweight | (South Korea) Dong Guk Shin | def. | (Japan) Shunya Imai | TKO (kick & punches) | 1 | 2:28 |
| Bantamweight | (South Korea) Ik Hwan Jang | def. | (Azerbaijan) Emil Abbasov | TKO (ground & pound) | 2 | 4:05 |
Young Guns 036
| Weight class | | | | Method | Round | Time | Notes |
| -86 kg Catchweight | (Russia) Magomed Mutaev | def. | (South Korea) Eun Soo Kim | Submission (guillotine choke) | 1 | 2:11 |
| Woman's Atomweight | (South Korea) Jeong Eun Park | def. | (South Korea) Si Woo Park | Decision (3-0) | 2 | 5:00 |
| Bantamweight | (South Korea) Seung Min Shin | def. | (China) Jianwei He | Decision (3-0) | 2 | 5:00 |
| Flyweight | (South Korea) Sung Jae Kim | vs. | (South Korea) Soo Wan Park | Draw (1-0) | 2 | 5:00 |
| Welterweight | (South Korea) Byung Ha Lim | def. | (South Korea) Yong Joo Lim | Submission (kimura) | 1 | 1:04 |
| Lightweight | (South Korea) Tae Ho Jin | def. | (South Korea) Young Jun Cho | TKO (punches) | 1 | 1:29 |
| Bantamweight | (South Korea) Jin Park | def. | (South Korea) Sung Jun Park | Decision (3-0) | 2 | 5:00 |

== Road FC 041 ==
Road FC 041

Information
- Promotion: Road Fighting Championship
- Date: August 12, 2017
- Venue: Wonju Gymnasium
- City: (South Korea) Wonju, Gangwon-do

Event chronology
| Road FC 040 | Road FC 041 | Road FC 042 |

Xiaomi Road FC 041 was an MMA event held by Road FC on August 12, 2017 at the Wonju Gymnasium in Wonju, Gangwon-do, South Korea.

=== Results ===
Main card
| Weight class | | | | Method | Round | Time | Notes |
|---|---|---|---|---|---|---|---|
| Openweight | (South Korea) Hyun Man Myung | def. | (United States) Chris Barnett | KO (punch) | 2 | 1:48 |
| Woman's Atomweight | (Japan) Tomo Maesawa | def. | (South Korea) Ye Ji Lee | Decision (2-0) | 2 | 5:00 |
| Openweight | (United States) Jake Heun | def. | (South Korea) Mu Bae Choi | Decision (3-0) | 3 | 5:00 |
| Lightweight | (Brazil) Bruno Miranda | def. | (South Korea) Won Bin Ki | TKO (Punches) | 1 | 4:36 | (Note: Reserve Bout for the Road FC $1 Million Lightweight Tournament) |
| Bantamweight | (South Korea) Dae Young Jang | def. | (South Korea) Hyung Geun Park | Submission (rear naked choke) | 2 | 2:12 |
| Middleweight | (South Korea) Jung Kyo Park | def. | (South Korea) Ji Hoon Kim | TKO (punches) | 1 | 3:36 |
Young Guns 035
| Weight class | | | | Method | Round | Time | Notes |
| -60 kg Catchweight | (South Korea) Jae Nam Yoo | def. | (Japan) Tatsuhito Satsuma | Submission (rear naked choke) | 1 | 2:33 |
| Featherweight | (South Korea) Seung Min Shin | def. | (South Korea) Kyung Chul Min | KO (punches) | 1 | 0:26 |
| Women's -50 kg Catchweight | (South Korea) Yuri Shim | def. | (South Korea) Hyun Joo Baek | Technical Submission (rear naked choke) | 2 | 1:13 |
| Flyweight | (South Korea) Won Hee Jung | def. | (South Korea) Yeon Soo Kang | KO (punch) | 1 | 1:12 |
| Middleweight | (South Korea) In Soo Hwang | def. | (South Korea) Jong Hwan Lee | KO (punch) | 1 | 2:44 |
| Flyweight | (South Korea) Jin Yong Kim | def. | (South Korea) Hyo Ryong Kim | Decision (3-0) | 2 | 5:00 |
| Bantamweight | (South Korea) Jong Tae Hong | def. | (South Korea) Sung Soo Lee | TKO (punches) | 2 | 4:49 |

== Road FC 040 ==
Road FC 040

Information
- Promotion: Road Fighting Championship
- Date: July 15, 2017
- Venue: Jangchung Gymnasium
- City: (South Korea) Seoul

Event chronology
| Road FC 039 | Road FC 040 | Road FC 041 |

Xiaomi Road FC 040 was an MMA event held by Road FC on July 15, 2017 at the Jangchung Gymnasium in Seoul, South Korea.

=== Results ===
Part 2
| Weight class | | | | Method | Round | Time | Notes |
|---|---|---|---|---|---|---|---|
| Openweight | (United States) Mighty Mo (c) | def. | (South Korea) Dong Kook Kang | TKO (ground & pound) | 2 | 2:25 | (Note: For the Road FC Openweight Championship) |
| Lightweight | (Mongolia) Khuukhenkhuu Amartuvshin | def. | (Japan) Shinji Sasaki | KO (punch) | 1 | 1:22 | (Note: Road FC $1 Million Lightweight Tournament Opening Round) |
| Lightweight | (Brazil) Tom Santos | def. | (South Korea) Yui Chul Nam | TKO (punches) | 1 | 0:07 | (Note: Road FC $1 Million Lightweight Tournament Opening Round) |
| Lightweight | (Brazil) Ronys Torres | def. | (Russia) Elnur Agaev | Submission (keylock) | 1 | 2:19 | (Note: Road FC $1 Million Lightweight Tournament Opening Round) |
| Lightweight | (Japan) Kota Shimoishi | def. | (South Korea) Dae Seong Park | Submission (rear naked choke) | 3 | 3:07 | (Note: Road FC $1 Million Lightweight Tournament Opening Round) |
| Lightweight | (Mongolia) Nandin-Erdene | def. | (Brazil) Toninho Furia | TKO (punches) | 1 | 3:25 | (Note: Road FC $1 Million Lightweight Tournament Opening Round) |
| Lightweight | (France) Mansour Barnaoui | def. | (South Korea) Chang Hyun Kim | Submission (rear naked choke) | 1 | 4:28 | (Note: Road FC $1 Million Lightweight Tournament Opening Round) |
| Lightweight | (Russia) Shamil Zavurov | def. | (United States) Leo Kuntz | Decision (unanimous) | 3 | 5:00 | (Note: Road FC $1 Million Lightweight Tournament Opening Round) |
| Lightweight | (China) Yincang Bao | def. | (Philippines) Reydon Romero | TKO (ground & pound) | 2 | 3:14 | (Note: Road FC $1 Million Lightweight Tournament Opening Round) |
Part 1
| Weight class | | | | Method | Round | Time | Notes |
| Middleweight | (South Korea) Hoon Kim | def. | (Japan) Riki Fukuda | TKO (punches) | 2 | 2:38 |
| Women's Flyweight | (Japan) Emiko Raika | def. | (South Korea) Hae In Kim | Decision (2-1) | 2 | 5:00 |
| Lightweight | (Russia) Alexander Merezhko | def. | (South Korea) Doo Je Jung | Submission (rear naked choke) | 1 | 4:06 | (Note: Reserve Bout for the Road FC $1 Million Lightweight Tournament) |
| Lightweight | (South Korea) Hae Jin Park | def. | (South Korea) Hyung Seok Lee | KO (punch) | 2 | 4:59 | (Note: Reserve Bout for the Road FC $1 Million Lightweight Tournament) |
| Lightweight | (South Korea) Dong Hwan Lim | def. | (South Korea) Ji Hoon Kim | Decision (3-0) | 2 | 5:00 | (Note: Reserve Bout for the Road FC $1 Million Lightweight Tournament) |

== Road FC 039 ==
Road FC 039

Information
- Promotion: Road Fighting Championship
- Date: June 10, 2017
- Venue: Jangchung Gymnasium
- City: (South Korea) Seoul

Event chronology
| Road FC 038 | Road FC 039 | Road FC 040 |

Xiaomi Road FC 039 was an MMA event held by Road FC on June 10, 2017 at the Jangchung Gymnasium in Seoul, South Korea.

=== Results ===
Main card
| Weight class | | | | Method | Round | Time | Notes |
|---|---|---|---|---|---|---|---|
| Woman's Atomweight | (South Korea) Seo Hee Ham | def. | (Japan) Mina Kurobe | TKO (punches) | 3 | 4:13 | (Note: For the inaugural Road FC Women's Atomweight Championship) |
| Openweight | (China) Aorigele | vs. | (South Korea) Hyun Man Myung | NC (accidental kick to the groin) | 1 | 0:09 |
| Women's Openweight | (Japan) Yoshiko Hirano | def. | (South Korea) Sun Yoo Cheon | Submission (kimura) | 1 | 4:49 |
| Flyweight | (South Korea) Je Hoon Moon | def. | (Japan) Kai Asakura | KO (punches) | 3 | 3:28 |
| Lightweight | (Kyrgyzstan) Rafael Fiziev | def. | (South Korea) Seung Yeon Kim | KO (knee and punches) | 1 | 4:24 | (Note: International Trials for Road FC $1 Million Lightweight Tournament) |
| Openweight | (South Korea) Yoon Jae Shim | vs. | (South Korea) Chang Hee Kim | NC (jaw injury) | 1 | 0:25 |
Young Guns 034
| Weight class | | | | Method | Round | Time | Notes |
| -80 kg Catchweight | (South Korea) In Jae La | def. | (South Korea) In Ho Cha | Decision (3-0) | 2 | 5:00 |
| Featherweight | (South Korea) Se Young Kim | def. | (South Korea) Jung Young Lee | Decision (3-0) | 2 | 5:00 |
| Lightweight | (China) Yincang Bao | def. | (China) Mingwu Wang | Submission (rear naked choke) | 1 | 1:41 | (Note: China Trials for Road FC $1 Million Lightweight Tournament) |
| Women's Atomweight | (Japan) Mika Arai | def. | (South Korea) Yun Ha Hong | Decision (3-0) | 2 | 5:00 |
| Bantamweight | (South Korea) Young Geun Kim | def. | (South Korea) Woo Been Kim | Submission (armbar) | 1 | 3:18 |
| Lightweight | (South Korea) Yo Han Kim | def. | (South Korea) Byeong Ha Lim | Decision (2-1) | 2 | 5:00 |
| Welterweight | (South Korea) Jin Kyu Lee | def. | (United Kingdom) Stuart Gooch | Decision (2-1) | 2 | 5:00 |

== Road FC 038 ==
Road FC 038

Information
- Promotion: Road Fighting Championship
- Date: April 15, 2017
- Venue: Jangchung Gymnasium
- City: (South Korea) Seoul

Event chronology
| Road FC 037 XX | Road FC 038 | Road FC 039 |

Xiaomi Road FC 038 was an MMA event held by Road FC on April 15, 2017 at the Jangchung Gymnasium in Seoul, South Korea.

=== Results ===
Main card
| Weight class | | | | Method | Round | Time | Notes |
|---|---|---|---|---|---|---|---|
| Bantamweight | (South Korea) Soo Chul Kim | def. | (South Korea) Min Woo Kim | Decision (3-0) | 3 | 5:00 | (Note: For the vacant Road FC Bantamweight Championship) |
| Openweight | (South Korea) Hyun Man Myung | def. | (United States) Chris Barnett | TKO (doctor stoppage) | 1 | 2:17 |
| Lightweight | (Brazil) Tom Santos | def. | (South Korea) Yui Chul Nam | TKO (punches) | 2 | 3:12 | (Note: International Trials for Road FC $1 Million Lightweight Tournament) |
| Lightweight | (Mongolia) Nandin-Erdene | def. | (Brazil) Bruno Miranda | TKO (punches) | 1 | 0:55 | (Note: International Trials for Road FC $1 Million Lightweight Tournament) |
| Lightweight | (France) Mansour Barnaoui | def. | (South Korea) Won Bin Ki | Submission (rear naked choke) | 1 | 4:46 | (Note: International Trials for Road FC $1 Million Lightweight Tournament) |
| Middleweight | (South Korea) Dae Sung Kim | def. | (Japan) Kiyoshi Kuwabara | TKO (punches) | 1 | 2:33 |
Young Guns 033
| Weight class | | | | Method | Round | Time | Notes |
| Bantamweight | (South Korea) Dae Young Jang | def. | (South Korea) Hyung Geun Park | Decision (2-1) | 2 | 5:00 |
| Lightweight | (Mongolia) Khuukhenkhuu Amartuvshin | def. | (China) Lianru Shang | TKO (pounding) | 1 | 0:40 | (Note: China Trials for Road FC $1 Million Lightweight Tournament) |
| Flyweight | (South Korea) Won Hee Jeong | def. | (South Korea) Jae Nam Yoo | TKO (punches) | 1 | 2:54 |
| Lightweight | (South Korea) Gyeong Eui Cho | def. | (South Korea) Jong Chan Choi | Decision (3-0) | 2 | 5:00 |
| Lightweight | (South Korea) Dong Gook Shin | def. | (South Korea) Byeong Ha Lim | TKO (knees & punches) | 1 | 0:53 |
| Bantamweight | (South Korea) Seong Bin Hong | def. | (South Korea) Yoon Jin Lee | TKO (arm injury) | 1 | 1:57 |

== Road FC 037 XX ==
Road FC 037 XX

Information
- Promotion: Road Fighting Championship
- Date: March 11, 2017
- Venue: Convention Centre, Grand Hilton Seoul
- City: (South Korea) Seoul

Event chronology
| Road FC 036 | Road FC 037 XX | Road FC 038 |

Xiaomi Road FC 037 XX was an MMA event held by Road FC on March 11, 2017 at the Convention Centre, Grand Hilton Seoul in Seoul, South Korea. The 1st event 'Road FC 037 XX' of the all-female MMA league Road FC XX was held on the main card. Road FC XX(pronounced “double x”, as in female chromosomes) is the official name for the league that showcased all-female fight cards on Road FC events. Road FC XX celebrates the rise in popularity in women's MMA, as well as the increasing number of talented female fighters in South Korea and abroad.

=== Results ===
Road FC 037 XX
| Weight class | | | | Method | Round | Time | Notes |
|---|---|---|---|---|---|---|---|
| Women's Flyweight | (Japan) Emiko Raika | def. | (South Korea) Jin Hee Kang | Decision (3-0) | 3 | 5:00 |
| Women's -46.5 kg Catchweight | (South Korea) Ye Ji Lee | def. | (Japan) Satoko Shinashi | Decision (3-0) | 3 | 5:00 |
| Women's -49.5 kg Catchweight | (South Korea) Jeong Eun Park | def. | (South Korea) Na Young Park | TKO (punches) | 2 | 2:07 |
| Women's Atomweight | (South Korea) So Hee Lim | def. | (Japan) Hana Date | Decision (3-0) | 2 | 5:00 |
| Women's Strawweight | (Japan) Emi Fujino | def. | (Russia) Natalya Denisova | Submission (rear naked choke) | 2 | 1:25 |
| Women's Strawweight | (South Korea) Yuri Shim | def. | (Japan) Shiho Harada | Decision (3-0) | 2 | 5:00 |
| Women's -50.5 kg Catchweight | (China) Xiangjie Wang | def. | (South Korea) Yoon Ha Hong | Decision (2-0) | 2 | 5:00 |
Young Guns 032
| Weight class | | | | Method | Round | Time | Notes |
| Bantamweight | (South Korea) Ik Hwan Jang | def. | (Japan) Yuta Nezu | Decision (3-0) | 3 | 5:00 |
| Flyweight | (Japan) Kai Asakura | def. | (China) Alateng Heili | TKO (knee) | 1 | 0:29 |
| Middleweight | (South Korea) Young Jun Jeon | def. | (South Korea) Ju Won Kim | TKO (ground & pound) | 1 | 1:39 |
| Featherweight | (South Korea) Seung Min Shin | def. | (China) Junkai Yang | Decision (3-0) | 2 | 5:00 |
| Featherweight | (Japan) Mikuru Asakura | def. | (South Korea) Doo Seok Oh | TKO (kick & punches) | 1 | 4:06 |
| Flyweight | (South Korea) Tae Kyun Kim | def. | (China) Deyu Wang | Decision (2-1) | 2 | 5:00 |
| Flyweight | (South Korea) Ho Young Yoon | def. | (South Korea) Gi Won Go | Decision (3-0) | 2 | 5:00 |
| Middleweight | (South Korea) Dong Hwan Lim | def. | (South Korea) In Yong Choi | Decision (2-0) | 2 | 5:00 |

== Road FC 036 ==
Road FC 036

Information
- Promotion: Road Fighting Championship
- Date: February 11, 2017
- Venue: Jangchung Gymnasium
- City: (South Korea) Seoul

Event chronology
| Road FC 035 | Road FC 036 | Road FC 037 XX |

Xiaomi Road FC 036 was an MMA event held by Road FC on February 11, 2017 at the Jangchung Gymnasium in Seoul, South Korea.

=== Results ===
Part 2
| Weight class | | | | Method | Round | Time | Notes |
|---|---|---|---|---|---|---|---|
| Middleweight | (Japan) Riki Fukuda | def. | (South Korea) Nae Chul Kim | Decision (3-0) | 3 | 5:00 | (Note: Road FC Middleweight Contenders Bout) |
| Lightweight | (Japan) Shinji Sasaki | def. | (China) Albert Cheng | Decision (3-0) | 3 | 5:00 | (Note: International Trials for Road FC $1 Million Lightweight Tournament) |
| Lightweight | (United States) Leo Kuntz | def. | (South Korea) Young Gi Hong | Submission (rear naked choke) | 3 | 1:47 | (Note: International Trials for Road FC $1 Million Lightweight Tournament) |
| Lightweight | (South Korea) Dae Sung Park | def. | (Brazil) Rodrigo Capora | Decision (3-0) | 3 | 5:00 | (Note: International Trials for Road FC $1 Million Lightweight Tournament) |
| Openweight | (Japan) Yoshiko Hirano | def. | (South Korea) Sun Yoo Cheon | KO (punch) | 1 | 2:01 | (Note: Road FC $1 Million Lightweight Tournament Opening Round) |
| Lightweight | (Russia) Shamil Zavurov | def. | (South Korea) Won Gi Kim | Decision (3-0) | 3 | 5:00 | (Note: Road FC $1 Million Lightweight Tournament Opening Round) |
Part 1
| Weight class | | | | Method | Round | Time | Notes |
| Flyweight | (Japan) Taiyo Nakahara | def. | (South Korea) Je Hoon Moon | Decision (3-0) | 3 | 5:00 |
| Lightweight | (Brazil) Toninho Furia | def. | (South Korea) Hyung Seok Lee | Decision (3-0) | 3 | 5:00 | (Note: International Trials for Road FC $1 Million Lightweight Tournament) |
| Lightweight | (South Korea) Chang Hyun Kim | def. | (United States) Andy Main | Decision (3-0) | 3 | 5:00 | (Note: International Trials for Road FC $1 Million Lightweight Tournament) |
| Lightweight | (Brazil) Ronys Torres | def. | (Kazakhstan) Ermek Tlauov | Submission (guillotine choke) | 1 | 4:50 | (Note: International Trials for Road FC $1 Million Lightweight Tournament) |
| Lightweight | (South Korea) Hae Jin Park | def. | (South Korea) Young Seung Cho | Decision (3-0) | 3 | 5:00 | (Note: Reserve Fight for Road FC $1 Million Lightweight Tournament) |
| Lightweight | (South Korea) Won Bin Ki | def. | (South Korea) Je Il Jung | TKO (punches) | 1 | 0:59 | (Note: Reserve Fight for Road FC $1 Million Lightweight Tournament) |
Opening Matches
| Weight class | | | | Method | Round | Time | Notes |
| Lightweight | (South Korea) Kyung Chul Min | def. | (South Korea) Young Jun Cho | KO (punch) | 1 | 4:33 |
| Flyweight | (South Korea) Jin Soo Seo | def. | (South Korea) Soo Wan Park | TKO (ground & pound) | 1 | 1:45 |
| Bantamweight | (South Korea) Dong Soo Seo | def. | (South Korea) Sung Soo Lee | Decision (3-0) | 2 | 5:00 |

== See also ==
- List of Road FC events
- List of Road FC champions
- List of current Road FC fighters
- List of current mixed martial arts champions
