= Emi Fujino =

Japanese mixed martial artist

- Born: November 17, 1980 (age 45); Toyohashi, Aichi Prefecture, Japan
- Other names: Kamikaze Angel
- Height: 5 ft 3 in (1.60 m)
- Weight: 114 lb (52 kg)
- Division: Bantamweight (2004–2005); Flyweight (2007–2008); Strawweight (2007–present)
- Style: Catch wrestling, Kickboxing
- Fighting out of: Japan
- Team: Wajutsu Keishukai GODS
- Rank: Purple belt in Brazilian Jiu-Jitsu

Kickboxing record
- Total: 5
- Wins: 2
- By knockout: 1
- Losses: 3
- By knockout: 1

Mixed martial arts record
- Total: 50
- Wins: 31
- By knockout: 3
- By submission: 11
- By decision: 17
- Losses: 17
- By knockout: 3
- By decision: 14
- Draws: 1
- No contests: 1

Other information
- Website: Official blog
- Mixed martial arts record from Sherdog
- Last updated on: August 30, 2015

Emi Fujino (藤野 恵実, Fujino Emi; born on November 17, 1980) is a Japanese mixed martial artist, kickboxer and professional wrestler, occasionally nicknamed Kamikaze Angel (特攻天女, tokkō tennyo).

== Background ==
Fujino was born on November 17, 1980 in Aichi Prefecture, Japan. After graduating from college, she started training in Japanese style of catch wrestling and other combat sports for dieting purposes.

== Mixed martial arts career ==
=== Early career ===
Fujino made her professional MMA debut at Smackgirl-F: Next Cinderella Tournament 2nd stage & SG-F7 on March 20, 2004, defeating Seri Saito by unanimous decision. Fujino obtained her second victory by defeating Eri Takahashi with an armbar submission in the second round on April 18, 2004 at Cross Section. On November 29, 2006 at Smackgirl 2006: Legend of Extreme Women, Fujino got her third straight win, defeating Mai Ichii via unanimous decision.

Fujino's fourth bout was a first round straight armbar submission victory over Madoka Okada at Smackgirl 2007: Will The Queen Paint The Shinjuku Skies Red? on March 11, 2007. Continuing her winning streak, Fujino defeated Anna Saito via submission (rear naked choke) in the first round on May 27, 2007 at the event K-Grace. Fujino defeated Yukiko Seki via unanimous decision at Smackgirl 2007: Queens' Hottest Summer on September 6, 2007. At Cage Force EX: eastern bound on November 11, 2007, Fujino got her seventh consecutive victory when she faced and defeated Yuko Yamazaki via unanimous decision. In her next fight, Fujino defeated Mei Yamaguchi by split decision on December 26, 2007 at Smackgirl 7th Anniversary: Starting Over.

Ending Fujino's winning streak and breaking her undefeated record, women's MMA legend Megumi Yabushita defeated Fujino by unanimous decision on July 21, 2008 at Demolition 080721.

=== Valkyrie ===
Debuting with promotion Valkyrie at the promotion's first event Valkyrie 01, Fujino was defeated by veteran Tomomi Sunaba via unanimous decision on November 8, 2008.

In a rematch of their 2007 bout, Mei Yamaguchi defeated Fujino by unanimous decision during Valkyrie women's featherweight tournament at Valkyrie 02 on April 25, 2009.

In her fourth consecutive loss, Fujino was defeated via majority decision by Kyoko Takabayashi on April 11, 2010 at Valkyrie 05. Fujino rebounded with a victory over Anna Saito in a rematch of their 2007 fight at Valkyrie 08 on November 28, 2010. Fujino choked Saito unconscious with a rear-naked choke in less than thirty seconds. Fujino faced Megumi Fujii at World Victory Road Presents: Soul of Fight on December 30, 2010 and was defeated by unanimous decision.

=== Jewels ===
Fujino made her Jewels debut against Celine Haga at Jewels 17th Ring on December 17, 2011. She won the fight by unanimous decision.

Fujino faced Mika Nagano at Jewels 18th Ring on March 3, 2012. She won the fight by unanimous decision. Fujino challenged Jewels champion Ayaka Hamasaki in a title fight at Jewels 22nd Ring on December 15, 2012 in Tokyo. She was defeated by unanimous decision.

On May 19, 2013, Fujino made her Pancrase debut at Pancrase 247. She was scheduled to face Monica Lovato, but Lovato suffered an injury and Fujino instead faced Amber Brown. She defeated Brown by submission due to a neck crank in the second round. Fujino next faced Hyo Kyung Song at Deep Jewels 1 on August 31, 2013. She defeated Song by submission due to a rear-naked choke in the second round. In a rematch at Deep Jewels 2 on November 4, 2013, Fujino faced Mizuki Inoue in the opening round of the Deep Jewels lightweight title tournament. She was defeated by unanimous decision.

In her North American MMA debut, Fujino faced Jessica Aguilar on June 21, 2014 at World Series of Fighting 10: Branch vs. Taylor. She lost the fight via unanimous decision.

=== Deep Jewels and Road FC ===
Returning to Japan, Fujino was scheduled to fight Ayaka Miura at Deep - Jewels 6 on November 3, 2014. She won the fight by unanimous decision.

Fujino was scheduled to face Emi Tomimatsu at Deep - Dream Impact 2014: Omisoka Special on December 31, 2014. She won the fight by unanimous decision.

Fujino made her Road FC debut against Jeong Eun Park at Road FC 023 on May 2, 2015. She beat Park by majority decision.

Fujino fought a rematch with Mizuki Inoue at Deep - Jewels 9 on August 29, 2015, for the Deep Jewels Strawweight Championship. Inoue successfully defended her title, winning the fight by unanimous decision.

Fujino faced Nori Date at Deep - Jewels 10 on November 23, 2015. She won the fight by first-round submission, locking in a rear naked choke after just 47 seconds.

Fujino was scheduled to fight the future UFC strawweight champion Zhang Weili at Rebels 45 on August 7, 2016. Weili won the fight by a second-round TKO.

Fujino faced another future UFC strawweight, Yan Xiaonan, at Road FC 034 on November 19, 2016. Midway through the first round, an inadvertent clash of heads rendered Fujino unable to continue. The fight was accordingly called a no contest.

Fujino was scheduled to face Natalia Denisova Road FC 037 on March 11, 2017. She won the bout with a second-round rear naked choke.

Back in Japan, Fujino faced Hyun Ju Baek at Deep 79 Impact on September 16, 2017. She won the fight by a first-round rear naked choke.

Fujino was scheduled to fight Aline Sattelmayer at Road FC 044 on November 11, 2017. She won the fight by unanimous decision.

=== Pancrase ===
In early 2018, Fujino signed with Pancrase. She was scheduled to make her promotional return against Sharon Jacobson at Pancrase 296 on May 20, 2018. She won the fight by unanimous decision.

Fujino was scheduled to face the former Pancrase strawweight champion Viviane Araújo at Pancrase 298 on August 5, 2018. Araújo won the bout by a third-round TKO.

Fujino was scheduled to face Kseniia Guseva at Pancrase 304 on April 14, 2019. She won the fight by unanimous decision.

Fujino fought Edna Oliveira Ajala at Pancrase 308 on September 29, 2019. Fujino was awarded a TKO victory at the end of the second round, as Ajala had to withdraw with a wrist injury.

Fujino faced Hyun Ji Jang for the Pancrase Women's Strawweight Championship at Pancrase 311 on December 11, 2019. She won the fight with a third-round rear-naked choke submission.

=== Rizin FF ===
Fujino was scheduled to face Ayaka Hamasaki on September 19, 2021 at Rizin 30. She lost the fight by unanimous decision.

=== Loss of Pancrase title ===
Fujino faced Karen in her first title defence of the Pancrase Women's Strawweight Championship at Pancrase 326 on March 21, 2022. After being taken down in the 4th round and elbowed from mount, a cut was opened leading to excessive bleeding that resulted in the referee stopping the bout.

Fujino was booked to face Song Hye Yun at Pancrase 329 on September 11, 2022. However the bout was scrapped after Song had visa issues and postponed till next month. The bout was supposed to take place at Pancrase 28th Neo-Blood Tournament Finals on October 9, 2022, but for unknown reasons Fujino faced Ayaka Watanabe instead of Song Hye Yun. She won the fight via unanimous decision.

Fujino faced Edna Trakinas at Pancrase 333 on April 30, 2023, losing the bout via unanimous decision.

Fujino faced Shiho Mori on July 23, 2023 at Shooto 2023 Vol.5, submitting her via rear-naked choke in the first round.

Fujino faced Momoka Hoshuyama on September 24, 2023, at Shooto 2023 Vol. 6, winning the bout via majority decision.

Fujino faced Megumi Sugimoto on November 19, 2023 at Shooto 2023 Vol. 7, with the bout resulting in a majority draw.

== Professional wrestling career ==
Fujino debuted in her professional wrestling career with promotion Ice Ribbon on August 15, 2009 in a match against Emi Sakura. In her last match, she went to a time limit draw with Mai Ichii on May 3, 2010.

== Kickboxing and Shoot boxing career ==
On November 18, 2009 at shoot boxing event Takeshi Road -bushido- The Fifth, Fujino started her kickboxing career with a TKO defeat at the hands of Girls S-Cup winner Rena Kubota after Kubota broke Fujino's nose and rendered her unable to come out for the third round.

Debuting with kickboxing promotion J-Network with the J-Girls brand, in a result considered an upset, Fujino was defeated by 16-year-old Mizuki Inoue via unanimous decision at J-Girls Catch The Stone 9 on July 25, 2010. On October 17, 2010 at J-Girls Catch The Stone 11, Fujino defeated Nozomi Satake by unanimous decision.

On August 19, 2011, Fujino entered the 2011 Shoot Boxing Girls S-Cup tournament. She faced Seo Hee Ham in the opening round and was defeated by majority decision.

Fujino returned to J-Girls on November 18, 2012 at J-Girls 2012: Platinum's In The Ring Final and knocked out Ruri in 44 seconds.

== Championships and accomplishments ==
- Shooto
  - Shooto Women's Strawweight Championship (one time; current)
- Pancrase
  - Pancrase Women's Strawweight Championship (one time; former)

== Mixed martial arts record ==
Professional record breakdown
50 matches	31 wins	17 losses
By knockout	3	3
By submission	11	0
By decision	17	14
Draws	1	
No contests	1	

Res.	Record	Opponent	Method	Event	Date	Round	Time	Location	Notes
Loss	31–17–1 (1)	Shizuka Sugiyama	Decision (unanimous)	Pancrase 366	September 23, 2026	3	5:00	Tachikawa, Japan	Catchweight (119 lb) bout.
Win	31–16–1 (1)	Mika Arai	Decision (unanimous)	Shooto Colors Vol.6	January 18, 2026	3	5:00	Tokyo, Japan	Catchweight (117 lb) bout.
Loss	30–16–1 (1)	Miki Motono	Decision (unanimous)	Pancrase 352	March 8, 2025	3	5:00	Yokohama, Japan	
Loss	30–15–1 (1)	Haruka Hasegawa	Decision (unanimous)	Pancrase 347	September 29, 2024	5	5:00	Tokyo, Japan	For the Pancrase Women's Strawweight Championship.
Win	30–14–1 (1)	Megumi Sugimoto	TKO (punches)	Shooto 2024 Vol.4	May 19, 2024	3	3:43	Tokyo, Japan	Won the inaugural Shooto Women's Strawweight Championship.
Win	29–14–1 (1)	Haruka Yoshinari	TKO (punches)	Shooto 2024 Vol.2	January 28, 2024	2	3:09	Tokyo, Japan	
Draw	28–14–1 (1)	Megumi Sugimoto	Draw (majority)	Shooto 2023 Vol.7	November 19, 2023	2	5:00	Tokyo, Japan	
Win	28–14 (1)	Momoka Hoshuyama	Decision (majority)	Shooto 2023 Vol.6	September 24, 2023	2	5:00	Tokyo, Japan	
Win	27–14 (1)	Shiho Mori	Submission (rear-naked choke)	Shooto 2023 Vol.5	July 23, 2023	1	3:06	Tokyo, Japan	
Loss	26–14 (1)	Edna Oliveira	Decision (unanimous)	Pancrase 333	April 30, 2023	3	5:00	Tachikawa, Japan	
Win	26–13 (1)	Ayaka Watanabe	Decision (unanimous)	Pancrase: 28th Neo-Blood Tournament Finals	October 10, 2022	3	5:00	Tokyo, Japan	
Loss	25–13 (1)	Karen Pravajra	TKO (doctor stoppage)	Pancrase 326	March 21, 2022	4	3:18	Tokyo, Japan	Lost the Pancrase Women's Strawweight Championship.
Loss	25–12 (1)	Ayaka Hamasaki	Decision (unanimous)	Rizin 30	September 19, 2021	3	5:00	Saitama, Japan	Non-title bout.
Win	25–11 (1)	Hyun Ji Jang	Submission (rear-naked choke)	Pancrase 311	December 11, 2019	3	3:20	Tokyo, Japan	Won the vacant Pancrase Women's Strawweight Championship.
Win	24–11 (1)	Edna Oliveira Ajala	TKO (wrist injury)	Pancrase 308	September 29, 2019	2	5:00	Tokyo, Japan	
Win	23–11 (1)	Kseniia Guseva	Decision (unanimous)	Pancrase 304	April 14, 2019	3	5:00	Tokyo, Japan	
Loss	22–11 (1)	Viviane Araújo	TKO (doctor stoppage)	Pancrase 298	August 5, 2018	3	0:19	Tokyo, Japan	For the vacant Pancrase Women's Strawweight Championship.
Win	22–10 (1)	Sharon Jacobson	Decision (unanimous)	Pancrase 296	May 20, 2018	3	5:00	Tokyo, Japan	
Win	21–10 (1)	Aline Sattelmayer	Decision (unanimous)	Road FC 044	November 11, 2017	2	5:00	Shijiazhuang, Hebei, China	
Win	20–10 (1)	Hyun Ju Baek	Submission (rear naked choke)	Deep 79 Impact	September 16, 2017	1	1:50	Tokyo, Japan	
Win	19–10 (1)	Natalia Denisova	Submission (rear naked choke)	Road FC 037	March 11, 2017	2	1:25	Seoul, South Korea	
NC	18–10 (1)	Yan Xiaonan	NC (cut caused by accidental headbutt)	Road FC 034	November 19, 2016	1	2:48	Seoul, South Korea	A cut caused by an inadvertent clash of heads rendered Fujino unable to continue.
Loss	18–10	Zhang Weili	TKO (doctor stoppage)	Rebels: Rebels 45	August 7, 2016	2	2:51	Tokyo, Japan	
Win	18–9	Yoon Ha Hong	Submission (rear naked choke)	Road FC 031	May 14, 2016	1	0:47	Seoul, South Korea	
Win	17–9	Nori Date	Decision (unanimous)	Deep - Jewels 10	November 23, 2015	3	5:00	Tokyo, Japan	
Loss	16–9	Mizuki Inoue	Decision (unanimous)	Deep - Jewels 9	August 29, 2015	3	5:00	Tokyo, Japan	For the Deep Jewels Strawweight Championship.
Win	16–8	Jeong Eun Park	Decision (majority)	Road FC 023	May 2, 2015	2	5:00	Seoul, South Korea	
Win	15–8	Emi Tomimatsu	Decision (unanimous)	Deep - Dream Impact 2014: Omisoka Special	December 31, 2014	3	5:00	Saitama, Japan	
Win	14–8	Ayaka Miura	Decision (unanimous)	Deep - Jewels 6	November 3, 2014	3	5:00	Tokyo, Japan	
Loss	13–8	Jessica Aguilar	Decision (unanimous)	WSOF 10	June 21, 2014	5	5:00	Las Vegas, Nevada, United States	For the WSOF Women's Strawweight Championship.
Loss	13–7	Mizuki Inoue	Decision (unanimous)	Deep - Jewels 2	November 4, 2013	2	5:00	Tokyo, Japan	Deep Jewels Lightweight Grand Prix semi-final.
Win	13–6	Hyo Kyung Song	Submission (rear-naked choke)	Deep - Jewels 1	August 31, 2013	2	3:34	Tokyo, Japan	
Win	12–6	Amber Brown	Submission (neck crank)	Pancrase 247	May 19, 2013	2	4:18	Tokyo, Japan	
Loss	11–6	Ayaka Hamasaki	Decision (unanimous)	Jewels 22nd Ring	December 15, 2012	3	5:00	Tokyo, Japan	For the Jewels Lightweight (115 lbs) Queen Championship.
Win	11–5	Mika Nagano	Decision (unanimous)	Jewels 18th Ring	March 3, 2012	2	5:00	Tokyo, Japan	
Win	10–5	Celine Haga	Decision (unanimous)	Jewels 17th Ring	December 17, 2011	2	5:00	Tokyo, Japan	
Loss	9–5	Megumi Fujii	Decision (unanimous)	World Victory Road Presents: Soul of Fight	December 30, 2010	3	5:00	Tokyo, Japan	
Win	9–4	Anna Saito	Technical Submission (rear naked choke)	Valkyrie 08	November 28, 2010	1	0:28	Tokyo, Japan	
Loss	8–4	Kyoko Takabayashi	Decision (majority)	Valkyrie 05	April 11, 2010	3	3:00	Tokyo, Japan	
Loss	8–3	Mei Yamaguchi	Decision (unanimous)	Valkyrie 02	April 25, 2009	3	3:00	Tokyo, Japan	
Loss	8–2	Tomomi Sunaba	Decision (unanimous)	Valkyrie 01	November 8, 2008	3	3:00	Tokyo, Japan	
Loss	8–1	Megumi Yabushita	Decision (unanimous)	GCM - Demolition 080721	July 21, 2008	3	3:00	Tokyo, Japan	
Win	8–0	Mei Yamaguchi	Decision (split)	Smackgirl 7th Anniversary: Starting Over	December 26, 2007	2	5:00	Tokyo, Japan	
Win	7–0	Yuko Yamazaki	Decision (unanimous)	GCM - Cage Force EX Eastern Bound	November 11, 2007	2	5:00	Tokyo, Japan	
Win	6–0	Yukiko Seki	Decision (unanimous)	Smackgirl 2007: Queens' Hottest Summer	September 6, 2007	2	5:00	Tokyo, Japan	
Win	5–0	Anna Saito	Submission (rear naked choke)	K - GRACE 1	May 27, 2007	1	2:06	Tokyo, Japan	
Win	4–0	Madoka Okada	Submission (straight armbar)	Smackgirl 2007: Will The Queen Paint The Shinjuku Skies Red?	March 11, 2007	1	2:34	Tokyo, Japan	
Win	3–0	Mai Ichii	Decision (unanimous)	Smackgirl 2006: Legend of Extreme Women	November 29, 2006	2	5:00	Tokyo, Japan	
Win	2–0	Eri Takahashi	Submission (armbar)	GCM - Cross Section 1	April 18, 2004	2	1:56	Tokyo, Japan	
Win	1–0	Seri Saito	Decision (unanimous)	Smackgirl-F: Next Cinderella Tournament 2nd stage & SG-F7	March 20, 2004	2	5:00	Tokyo, Japan	

== Kickboxing and Shoot boxing record ==
Professional kickboxing and shoot boxing record
2 Wins (1 KO), 3 Losses
Date	Result	Opponent	Event	Location	Method	Round	Time
2012-11-18	Win	(Japan) Ruri	J-Girls 2012: Platinum's In The Ring Final	Tokyo, Japan	KO (punches)	1	0:44
2011-08-19	Loss	(South Korea) Seo Hee Ham	2011 Shoot Boxing Girls S-Cup	Tokyo, Japan	Decision (unanimous)	3	2:00
2010-10-17	Win	(Japan) Nozomi Satake	J-Girls: Catch the Stone 11	Tokyo, Japan	Decision (unanimous)	3	2:00
2010-07-25	Loss	(Japan) Mizuki Inoue	J-Girls: Catch The Stone 9	Tokyo, Japan	Decision (unanimous)	3	2:00
2009-11-18	Loss	(Japan) Rena Kubota	Shoot Boxing 2009 - Bushido 5th	Tokyo, Japan	TKO (doctors stoppage)	2	2:00
Legend: Win Loss Draw/No contest Notes

== See also ==
- List of female mixed martial artists
- List of female kickboxers
