= Road Fighting Championship =

MMA promoter based in South Korea

- Current season, competition or edition: 2023 in Road FC
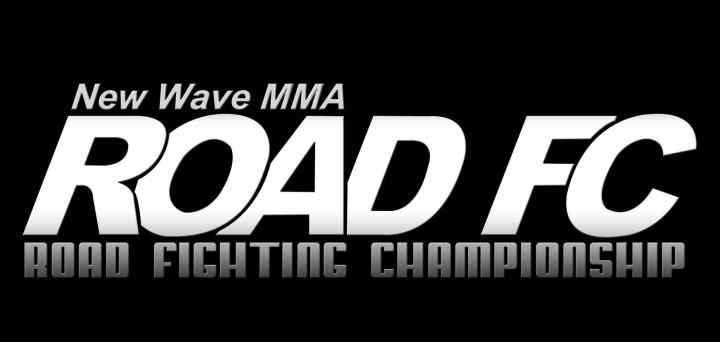
- Sport: Mixed martial arts promotion
- Founded: 2010; 16 years ago
- Owner: Jung Mun-Hong
- President: Kim Dae-Hwan; Park Sang-Min
- Headquarters: Wonju, South Korea
- Website: http://www.roadfc.com

Road Fighting Championship (Road FC; Korean: 로드FC) is a South Korean-based mixed martial arts (MMA) promotion which was officially launched in 2010. Prior to December 2016, Road FC had held 52 events in three countries - South Korea, Japan, and China.

== About ==
Road FC was established in 2010 to promote the sport of MMA which embodies the Asian spirit of martial arts. Over 300 athletes from South Korea, Brazil, North America, Europe, Japan, China, Southeast Asia, and the Middle East have signed agreements with Road FC. Events are being broadcast in more than 50 countries around the world, on dozens of television stations and internet platforms.

Road FC initiated its global strategy in 2015.

Road FC recognizes Asia as the global center of martial arts. In Asia, many combat sports have been born and become world-famous, such as Korea's Olympic sport Taekwondo and China's mammoth national Sanda competition. In the past, Asia was also the global center of MMA and kickboxing, where notable promotions such as Pride and K-1 once drew Asian crowds of 50 to 90 thousand spectators live, and broadcast live around the world. As these organizations subsided, Road FC was launched to take up the mantle in Korea.

== History ==
Road FC was founded in 2010 by Mun-Hong Jung. It is the largest MMA organization in South Korea following the closure of Spirit MC in 2009, and with expansion into Japan and China, one of the largest in Asia.

The first event, Road FC 001: The Resurrection of Champions, was held on October 23, 2010, in Seoul, South Korea.

In 2012 Road FC organized an amateur MMA competition system to encourage growth, experience, and support for the sport of MMA in Korea. The amateur and semi-pro Central and Into Leagues provide a structured, safe, and competitive atmosphere for beginning fighters. They gain experience before transitioning into professional competition. The Young Guns undercard series features amateurs transitioning into professionals, foreign fighters new to Road FC, and fighters who are trying to make a comeback.

In 2015, Road FC expanded into the Japan market with Road FC 24 in Japan on July 25 at the Ariake Arena in Tokyo. Also in 2015, it held its first event with Road FC 27 in China in Shanghai on December 26, starting a 3-year broadcast deal with China's state broadcaster CCTV. The event was the first live MMA event to be aired on CCTV5 and garnered a viewership of 35 million.

On March 11, 2017, the first event Road FC 037 XX of a female MMA league Road FC XX was held at the Convention Centre, Grand Hilton Seoul in Seoul, South Korea. And, On December 23, Road FC's final event of the year 2017, Road FC 045 XX, took place in Seoul, South Korea. Following it, the 2017 Road FC Awards Ceremony was held. It was the first time a year end awards ceremony had been held in conjunction with an event, and the first time to be aired live on television, on MBC Sports+. Incoming CEO Da Hwan Kim was formally introduced after Founder Jung Mun Hong Jung had stepped down from the position on November 29. Kim was one of South Korea's well-known MMA and combat sports commentators. He was a long-time MMA fighter and coach, who also won the Wardog Middleweight Championship by KO. Having experience in the MMA industry, Kim was a well-credentialed specialist to provide insight on fighters and matches.

On January 13, 2018, the sports industry in China attracted attention with the announcement of the "2018 China Top 100 Most Sponsored Sports Events Award Ceremony" in Beijing. Road FC ranks as the 15th overall "2018 China Top 100 Most Sponsored Sports Event". In 2017, Road FC was first honored with the award as the 65th most sponsored sports event, and the climb of 50 places in 2018 is a large achievement. Among the sponsors who have supported and committed to Road FC are recognizable companies and brands such as Xiaomi, Netease, Panda TV, COK, Red Bull, Master Kong Foods, Orion Foods, Zheng Guanzhuang Health, Chang Fujing Health, Pang Da Auto, Jackie Chan Wine, and Lehua Real Estate.

== Broadcasts ==
In South Korea, events are broadcast live and on delay and replay on SPOTV since 2018, the South Korean non-'free-to-air' television network which is well known for its sports broadcasting, and online on YouTube, Daum.

=== Broadcasters by year ===
#	Duration of broadcasting	broadcaster	Broadcasting team	
#	Duration of broadcasting	broadcaster	Commentator	Caster
5	2018 ~ (Road FC 047 ~ )	SPOTV	Gyo Deok Lee	Chan Woong Park
4	2017 ~ 2018 (Road FC 035 ~ Road FC 046)	MBC Sports+ & MBC Sports+2	Dong Gi Lee, Chang Wook Cheon	Byung Moon Jeong, Soo Hwan Kim
3	2013 ~ 2016 (Road FC 012 ~ Road FC 034)	Super action	Dae Hwan Kim	Soo Hwan Kim
2	2011 ~ 2013 (Road FC 002 ~ Road FC 011)	XTM	Dae Hwan Kim	Sang Yong Choi
1	2010 (Road FC 001)	K-STAR	Ji Hoon Kim	Seung Heon Seong

In China, events are broadcast live and on delay and replay on CCTV-5, the predominant state television broadcaster in the People's Republic of China, and online on Yy.com. In Mongolia, events are broadcast live and on delay and replay on MBN. In Japan, events are broadcast live and on delay and replay on Niconico, Tokyo MX, and AbemaTV. In Southeast Asia(Hong Kong, Indonesia, Malaysia and Brunei, Philippines, Singapore, Thailand, etc.), events are broadcast on KIX and SportsFix (Malaysia only). Internationally, events are streamed through Road FC's Official YouTube Channel.

== Rules ==
Road FC uses the global MMA rule set.

=== Rounds ===
Non-championship bouts are two or three rounds of five minutes per round with one minute breaks in between rounds. Championship bouts are three rounds of five minutes per round with one minute breaks in between rounds.

=== Judging ===
As part of the increasing global expansion strategy, Road FC has created the "Unlimited Points System".

This new judging criterion is merit-based to provide a more accurate account of a fighter's performance than the "10 point must" system. It rewards aggressive fighters while penalizing those who repeatedly stall or avoid action. The "Unlimited Points System" delivers more action that has been requested by fans.

In this system, points be awarded for specific action and activity. One point be given for a clear strike, takedown, near submission, full mont or back mount position, clear control on the ground, and aggression. Five points be awarded for a knock down.

Penalties be assessed by the referee. A yellow card for fouls incur a five-point deduction. A blue card worth a two-point deduction be introduced for the purpose of eliminating stalling and avoidance, standing and on the ground.

=== Cage ===
The Road FC stages bouts in an eight-sided enclosure named "Case".

The Road FC cage is an octagonal structure with walls of metal chain-link fence coated with black vinyl. The standard octagon has a diameter of 9 m (30 ft) with a 1.8 m (5.9 ft) high fence. The cage sits atop a platform, raising it 1.2 m (3.9 ft) from the ground. It has foam padding around the top of the fence and between each of the eight sections. It also has two entry-exit gates opposite each other. The mat, painted with sponsorship logos and art, is replaced for each event.

=== Attire ===
All competitors fight in approved shorts, without shoes. Tops are only approved for female competitors. Required safety equipment include padded gloves, mouthguard, and protective cups held in place.

=== Match outcome ===
Matches may end via:

- Submission: a fighter clearly taps the mat or his opponent, verbally submits, or clearly communicates being in pain (such as by yelling) to a degree that causes the referee to stop the fight. Also, a technical submission may be called when a fighter either loses consciousness or is on the verge of or suffers serious injury while in a hold.
- Knockout: a fighter is put into a state of unconsciousness resulting from any legal strike.
- Technical Knockout (TKO): If the referee decides a fighter cannot continue, the fight is ruled as a technical knockout. Technical knockouts can be classified into three categories:
  - referee stoppage (the referee ends the fight because one fighter is deemed unable to intelligently defend himself)
  - doctor stoppage (a ring side doctor decides that it is unsafe for one fighter to continue the bout, due to excessive bleeding or physical injuries)
  - corner stoppage (a fighter's cornerman signals defeat for his own fighter)
- Judges' Decision: Depending on scoring, a match may end as:
  - unanimous decision (all three judges score a win for fighter A)
  - majority decision (two judges score a win for fighter A, one judge scores a draw)
  - split decision (two judges score a win for fighter A, one judge scores a win for fighter B)
  - technical decision (a fighter is rendered unable to continue as a result of an unintentional illegal element or move, resulting in a decision based on the finished and unfinished rounds if the number of rounds to be judged is sufficient)
  - unanimous draw (all three judges score a draw)
  - majority draw (two judges score a draw, one judge scoring a win)
  - split draw (one judge scores a win for fighter A, one judge scores a win for fighter B, and one judge scores a draw)
  - technical draw (the bout ends in a manner similar to that of a technical decision, with the judges' scores resulting in a draw)
- Disqualification: a fighter intentionally executes an illegal move that is considered by the referee or opponent to be injurious or significant enough to negatively alter the opponent's performance should the fight continue, resulting in the opponent's victory.
- Forfeit: a fighter fails to compete or intentionally and prematurely ends the bout for a reason besides injury, resulting in the opponent's victory.
- No Contest: a fighter is rendered unable to continue or compete effectively as a result of an unintentional illegal element or move and there is not a sufficient number of finished rounds to be judged to make a technical decision viable, or both fighters are rendered unable to continue or compete effectively. Also, a fight may be ruled a no contest if the original outcome of the bout is changed due to unsatisfactory or illegal circumstances, such as a premature stoppage or a fighter's testing positive for banned substances.

=== Fouls ===
1. Biting
2. Eye-gouging
3. Fish-hooking
4. Groin attacks
5. Small joint manipulation
6. Hair pulling
7. Putting a finger into any orifice or into any cut or laceration on an opponent (see Fish-hooking)
8. Throat strikes of any kind, including, without limitation, grabbing the trachea
9. Clawing, pinching or twisting the flesh
10. Intentionally attempting to break an opponent's bone
11. Spiking an opponent to the canvas on the head or neck (see Piledriver)
12. Throwing an opponent out of the ring or fenced area
13. Holding the shorts or gloves of an opponent
14. Spitting at an opponent
15. Engaging in unsportsmanlike conduct that causes an injury to an opponent
16. Holding the ropes or the fence
17. Using abusive language in the ring or fenced area
18. Attacking an opponent on or during the break
19. Attacking an opponent who is under the care of the referee
20. Attacking an opponent after the bell (horn) has sounded the end of a round
21. Flagrantly disregarding the instructions of the referee
22. Timidity, including, without limitation, avoiding contact with an opponent, intentionally or consistently dropping the mouthpiece or faking an injury
23. Interference by the corner
24. Using any foreign substance that could give an unfair advantage
25. Head-butting
26. Striking to the spine or the back of the head (see Rabbit punch)
27. Attacking with an elbow

==== Fouls against a grounded opponent ====
1. Kicking the head of a grounded opponent (see soccer kick)
2. Kneeing the head of a grounded opponent
3. Stomping a grounded opponent

== Weight divisions/Current champions ==
=== Weight divisions ===
Road FC currently uses ten different weight classes, and weights allow a weighing scale error of over 0.5 kg (1.1 lb).

Weight class name	Upper limit		Gender
Weight class name	in kilograms (kg)	in pounds(lb)	Gender
Atomweight	48	105.8	Women
Strawweight	52	114.6	Women
Flyweight	57	125.7	Men / Women
Bantamweight	61	134.5	Men / Women
Featherweight	66	145.5	Men / Women
Lightweight	70	154.3	Men
Welterweight	77	169.8	Men
Middleweight	84	185.2	Men
Light Heavyweight	93	205	Men
Heavyweight	over 93	over 205	Men
Openweight	No weight restrictions		Men / Women

=== Current champions ===
Road FC has so far produced champions in seven weight classes for men and one weight class for women.

Division	Gender	Champion	Since	Reign (total)	Defenses	Next challenger/title fight
Atomweight	Women	Vacant			0	
Flyweight	Men	Vacant			0	
Bantamweight	Men	Vacant			0	
Featherweight	Men	(South Korea) Hae Jin Park	12. 18. 2022	1370	0	(TBD)
Lightweight	Men	(South Korea) Si Won Park	07. 23. 2022	1518	1	(TBD)
Middleweight	Men	(South Korea) In Su Hwang	07. 03. 2021	1903	0	(TBD)
Light Heavyweight	Men	(South Korea) Tae In Kim	12. 18. 2022	1370	0	(TBD)
Openweight	Men	Vacant			0	

=== Production team ===
Road FC CEO is former UFC and Road FC Commentator, Dae Hwan Kim, and the Road FC chairman is Road FC founder and former Road FC CEO, Moon Hong Jung.

Matches are made by matchmaker and operations manager, Young Bok Kwon.

The referees is composed of Sang Joon Park (head referee), Seung Yeol Shin, Tae Wook Lim, Deok Young Jang, Chul Kim, Gi Deok Song, Ho Won Jeong, Mi Ri Kwon.

The Broadcasting team for the television broadcast is composed of Dong Gi Lee (commentator), Chang Wook Chun (commentator), Byung Moon Jeong (caster), Soo Hwan Kim (caster).

The Announce team consists of cage announcers Yong Moon Shin, Jeff Houston and the cage side announcer is Lenne Hardt.

Seul Gi Choi, Ji Woo Lim, Eun Hye Lee are the ROAD girls.

== Affiliated organizations ==
Road FC is affiliated with the following organizations:

- (South Korea) Kaiser
- (Japan) ACF
- (Japan) Deep
- (Japan) Gladiator
- (Japan) Grachan
- (Japan) Rings/The Outsider
- (Japan) Wardog Cage Fight
- (Japan) ZST
- (China) Superstar Fight
- (China) WBK
- (China) CMSL
- (China) CFK
- (United States) Invicta FC
- (Taiwan) Rro FC

== Ring Girls ==
- Min Seo Gong
- Na Na Kim
- Ha Yool Kim
- Je-i Min
- A-Young Min
- Seung Ji Maeng
- Si Hyun Park
- Jin-A Park
- Ha Park
- Ga Yeon Song
- Hyo Kyung Song
- Serena
- Ke Yang
- Ji Yoon Wang
- Ha Na Yoo
- Seo Hyun Lee
- A-Rin Lee
- Eun Hye Lee (Present)
- Ye Bin Lee
- Ji Woo Lim (Present)
- Ji Hye Lim
- Da Ha Joo
- Bo Mi Chae
- Seol Hwa Chol
- Seul Gi Choi (Present)
- Ji Eun Han

== See also ==
- List of Road FC champions
- List of Road FC events
- List of notable Road FC fighters
- List of current Road FC fighters
- List of current mixed martial arts champions
- Mixed martial arts weight classes
