= Soo Chul Kim =

South Korean mixed martial artist (born 1991)

Kim Soo-chul
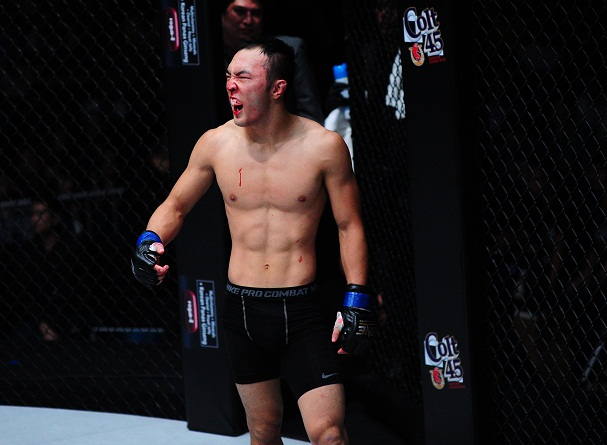
- Kim in 2012
- Born: Kim Soo-chul; December 10, 1991 (age 34); Wonju, Gangwon-do, South Korea
- Height: 5 ft 7 in (170 cm)
- Weight: 139 lb (63 kg; 9 st 13 lb)
- Division: Bantamweight (2010-2017, 2022-present); Featherweight (2010, 2011, 2021-2022)
- Reach: 67 in (170 cm)
- Fighting out of: Wonju, South Korea
- Team: Road Gym Wonju
- Rank: 1st degree black belt in Brazilian jiu-jitsu under Roan Carneiro
- Years active: 2010–2017, 2021-present

Mixed martial arts record
- Total: 36
- Wins: 24
- By knockout: 8
- By submission: 6
- By decision: 10
- Losses: 10
- By knockout: 1
- By submission: 3
- By decision: 6
- Draws: 1
- No contests: 1

Amateur record
- Total: 1
- Wins: 1
- By submission: 1
- Losses: 0

Other information
- Occupation: Physical educator, sports scientist, and practical skills professor at Seoul Hoseo Art Occupational Training College
- Spouse: Lee Go-eun
- Children: 1
- Mixed martial arts record from Sherdog

Kim Soo-chul (Korean: 김수철; born December 10, 1991), anglicized as Soo Chul Kim, is a South Korean professional mixed martial artist, and submission grappler. He currently competes in the Bantamweight division of Road FC, where he is the former Road FC Bantamweight Champion, and Road FC Featherweight Champion. He is the first fighter in Road FC history to win a championship in two different weight divisions. He formerly competed in the Bantamweight (Note: before the ONE Championship Bantamweight division changed its weight limit to 145 lbs at ONE: Dynasty of Champions (Changsha), the division’s bantamweight bouts were held at a limit of 135 lbs, including the inaugural title fight against Kim Soo-chul and Leandro Issa.) division of ONE FC, where he was the inaugural ONE FC Bantamweight Champion. He also competed for RIZIN, Bellator MMA, and Rising On, where he was their featherweight champion.

== Background and early life ==
Kim was born on December 10, 1991, in Wonju, Gangwon-do, South Korea. He started training in Taekwondo and Boxing around the age of 15, while attending Wonju Technical High School.

== Mixed martial arts career ==
=== Amateur career ===
Before turning professional in 2010 at the age of 19, Kim had one amateur mixed martial arts fight. He faced Jang Hwa-seung at Neo Fight - Challengers 2, on July 25, 2009. He won the fight by submission in the first round via armbar.

=== Early career ===
Kim made his professional MMA debut at Rising On 3 - Dynamic, facing Yasuhiro Kanayama. He won the fight in the first round due to an armbar, and he won the promotion’s vacant featherweight championship.

Soo faced Kim Hyo-ryeong, at Road FC 001: The Resurrection of Champions, on October 23 of 2010. He won the fight in the first round by submission, via guillotine choke.

Kim fought So Jae-hyun at Road FC 002: Alive, on April 16, 2011. He won the fight by unanimous decision.

Kim faced Andrew Leone at PRO Fighting 5 - Still Standing, on July 17, 2011. He lost the fight in the first round via submission, due to a guillotine choke.

Soo faced Kenta Nakamura at Road FC 003: Explosion, on July 24, 2011. He won via unanimous decision.

=== Inaugural ONE FC stint ===
Chul made his ONE FC debut against Leandro Issa at ONE FC: Champion vs. Champion, on September 3, 2011. He lost the fight via unanimous decision.

Kim faced Gustavo Falciroli at ONE FC: Battle of Heroes, on February 11 of 2012. He lost the fight in the first round via rear-naked choke submission.

=== Second stint at Road FC ===
Soo fought Moon Jae-hoon at Road FC 007: Recharged, on March 24, 2012. He lost the fight, by unanimous decision.

Kim faced Shōkō Satō at Road FC 008: Final 4 Bitter Rivals, on June 16 of 2012, in his hometown of Wonju. He won the fight in the fourth round via TKO, due to a doctor’s stoppage.

=== Return to ONE FC ===
Kim returned to ONE FC, facing Kevin Belingon at ONE FC: Pride of a Nation, on August 31, 2012. He won the fight via unanimous decision.

==== ONE FC Bantamweight Championship ====
Chul faced Leandro Issa in a rematch for the inaugural ONE FC Bantamweight Championship at ONE FC: Rise of Kings, on October 6, 2012. He won the fight in the second round via TKO to punches, and thus became the inaugural champion.

==== Losing the title ====
Kim made his first defense of the ONE FC bantamweight title by facing former DREAM two-division champion and multiple-time BJJ world champion Bibiano Fernandes, in ONE FC: Total Domination, on October 18 of 2013. He lost the fight via unanimous decision, losing the title in the process.

=== Third stint at Road FC ===
Kim returned to Road FC for a third time, fighting Motonobu Tezuka at Road FC 014, on February 9, 2014. He won the fight via TKO to punches in the first round.

Soo fought Issei Tamura at Road FC 015, on May 31 of 2014, in his hometown of Wonju. He won the fight via submission due to a guillotine choke in the first round.

Kim faced Wagner Campos at Road FC 021, on February 1, 2015. He won the fight via TKO to a flying knee and punches in the first round.

Soo fought Taiyo Nakahara at Road FC 024, on July 25, 2025. He won the fight via submission due to a guillotine choke in the first round.

Kim faced Marlon Sandro at Road FC 025, on August 22 of 2015. Soo and Marlon fought to a unanimous draw.

==== RIZIN debut ====
Kim faced Maike Linhares in his RIZIN debut at RIZIN World Grand Prix 2015: Part 2 - Iza, on December 31, 2015. He won the fight via unanimous decision.

Kim faced Marcus Brimage at Road FC 029, on March 12, 2016. He won the fight via unanimous decision.

Soo fought Zhumabek Tursyn at Road FC 032, on July 2, 2016. He won the fight via TKO due to punches in the second round.

Kim faced Shunichi Shimizu at Road FC 035, on December 10, 2016. He won the fight via submission due to an armbar in the second round.

==== ROAD FC Bantamweight Championship and retirement ====
Soo fought Kim Min-woo for the vacant ROAD FC Bantamweight Championship at Road FC 038, on April 15, 2017. He won the fight via unanimous decision, winning the title in the process. Kim emotionally celebrated with his parents, thanking them for being there for him, and he vowed to take care of them. At the 2017 Road FC Awards, he was named fighter of the year. Shortly after the induction, he retired, due to diagnosis of panic disorder. He relinquished the bantamweight title.

=== Return to MMA and fourth stint in Road FC ===
Kim was announced to return to MMA in the featherweight division of Road FC, facing Park Hae-jin for the vacant ROAD FC Featherweight Championship at Road FC 059, on September 4 of 2021. He lost the fight in the first round due to a guillotine choke, snapping a 8-fight winning streak inside the promotion.

Kim was set to face Park Hae-jin in an immediate rematch for the ROAD FC Featherweight Championship at Road FC 060, on May 14, 2022. He won the fight in the second round via TKO due to a head kick and punches, winning the featherweight title in the process. Kim was recognized as ROAD FC’s first ever double champion, as he held the bantamweight and featherweight straps.

=== Departure from Road FC and second stint in RIZIN ===
Kim signed to RIZIN in August 2022, and he later vacated the featherweight title of ROAD FC.

Kim faced former Shooto two-division champion Hiromasa Ougikubo at RIZIN 38, on September 25, 2022. He won the fight via unanimous decision.

Soo faced former Bellator Bantamweight World Champion and 4-division KOTC champion Juan Archuleta at Bellator MMA vs. RIZIN, on December 31, 2022. He lost the fight via split decision.

==== Fifth stint in Road FC ====
Kim faced Aleksey Indenko at Road FC 064 on June 24, 2023. He won the fight via submission in the first round, due to a guillotine choke.

Kim fought Bruno Azevedo at Road FC 065, on August 26 of 2023. He won by unanimous decision.

Kim faced Akira Haraguchi at Road FC 066, on October 29, 2023. He won the fight in the second round via KO, due to punches.

=== Stints between ROAD FC and RIZIN ===
Chul fought Taichi Nakajima at RIZIN 46, on April 29, 2024. He won the fight in the second round, via KO due to punches.

Kim faced Naoki Inoue at RIZIN 48 for the vacant RIZIN Bantamweight Championship, on September 29, 2024. He lost the fight in the first round via TKO, due to doctor’s stoppage.

Chul fought Kim Hyun-woo at Road FC 070, on October 27, 2024. He won the fight via unanimous decision.

Kim fought Yang Ji-yong at Road FC 071, on December 29 of 2024. Originally ruled as a KO win for Yang in the first round, the fight was overturned to a no contest, following a review of the footage showing an illegal headbutt. Chul faced a Orbital bone fracture. He later had a surgery on his orbital bone, receiving two titanium plates in his surgery and recovering fully across 2025 and 2026.

Kim faced Shōkō Satō in a rematch at RIZIN World Series in Korea, on May 31, 2025. He lost the fight via unanimous decision.

Kim faced Yang Ji-yong in a stoked and hyped rematch at Road FC 076, on March 15, 2026. Originally a 3-round tournament final for the ROAD FC Global Bantamweight Tournament Championship, the fight went an extra round. Kim won the fight via unanimous decision, and won the tournament championship.

== Championships and accomplishments ==
- Road Fighting Championship (ROAD FC)
  - ROAD FC Bantamweight Championship (Two time; current)
  - ROAD FC Featherweight Championship (One time; former)
  - 2024 ROAD FC Global Bantamweight Tournament Championship
  - 2023 ROAD FC Global Bantamweight Tournament Championship
- ONE Fighting Championship (ONE FC)
  - ONE FC Bantamweight Championship (One time; inaugural)
- Rising On Fighting Championship (ROFC)
  - Rising On Featherweight Championship (One time; former)

== Mixed martial arts record ==
Professional record breakdown
36 matches	24 wins	10 losses
By knockout	8	1
By submission	6	3
By decision	10	6
Draws	1	
No contests	1	

Res.	Record	Opponent	Method	Event	Date	Round	Time	Location	Notes
Loss	24–10–1 (1)	Ryuya Fukuda	Decision (unanimous)	Rizin 55	November 8, 2026	3	5:00	Funabashi, Japan	
Win	24–9–1 (1)	Yang Ji-yong	Decision (unanimous)	Road FC 76	March 15, 2026	4	5:00	Seoul, South Korea	Won the 2024 Road FC Bantamweight Tournament.
Loss	23–9–1 (1)	Shōkō Satō	Decision (unanimous)	Rizin World Series in Korea	May 31, 2025	3	5:00	Incheon, South Korea	
NC	23–8–1 (1)	Yang Ji-yong	NC (overturned)	Road FC 71	December 29, 2024	1	1:02	Wonju, South Korea	2024 Road FC Bantamweight Tournament Final. Originally a KO (punches) win for Yang; overturned after reviewing showed an accidental clash of heads.
Win	23–8–1	Kim Hyun-woo	Decision (unanimous)	Road FC 70	October 27, 2024	3	5:00	Wonju, South Korea	2024 Road FC Bantamweight Tournament Semifinal.
Loss	22–8–1	Naoki Inoue	TKO (punches)	Rizin 48	September 29, 2024	1	3:55	Saitama, Japan	For the vacant Rizin Bantamweight Championship.
Win	22–7–1	Taichi Nakajima	KO (punches)	Rizin 46	April 29, 2024	2	0:06	Tokyo, Japan	
Win	21–7–1	Akira Haraguchi	KO (punches)	Road FC 66	October 29, 2023	2	4:25	Wonju, South Korea	Won the 2023 Road FC Bantamweight Grand Prix.
Win	20–7–1	Bruno Azevedo	Decision (unanimous)	Road FC 65	August 26, 2023	3	5:00	Anyang, South Korea	2023 Road FC Bantamweight Grand Prix Semifinal.
Win	19–7–1	Aleksey Indenko	Submission (guillotine choke)	Road FC 64	June 24, 2023	1	0:55	Wonju, South Korea	2023 Road FC Bantamweight Grand Prix Quarterfinal.
Loss	18–7–1	Juan Archuleta	Decision (split)	Bellator MMA vs. Rizin	December 31, 2022	3	5:00	Saitama, Japan	
Win	18–6–1	Hiromasa Ougikubo	Decision (unanimous)	Rizin 38	September 25, 2022	3	5:00	Saitama, Japan	Return to Bantamweight.
Win	17–6–1	Park Hae-jin	KO (head kick and punches)	Road FC 60	May 13, 2022	2	0:09	Daejeon, South Korea	Won the Road FC Featherweight Championship.
Loss	16–6–1	Park Hae-jin	Submission (guillotine choke)	Road FC 59	September 4, 2021	1	4:50	Wonju, South Korea	Return to Featherweight. For the vacant Road FC Featherweight Championship.
Win	16–5–1	Kim Min-woo	Decision (unanimous)	Road FC 38	April 15, 2017	3	5:00	Seoul, South Korea	Won the vacant Road FC Bantamweight Championship.
Win	15–5–1	Shunichi Shimizu	Submission (armbar)	Road FC 35	December 10, 2016	2	3:49	Seoul, South Korea	
Win	14–5–1	Zhumabek Tursyn	TKO (punches)	Road FC 32	July 2, 2016	1	2:53	Changsha, China	Featherweight bout.
Win	13–5–1	Marcus Brimage	Decision (unanimous)	Road FC 29	March 12, 2016	1	2:53	Seoul, South Korea	
Win	12–5–1	Maike Linhares	Decision (unanimous)	Rizin World Grand Prix 2015: Part 2 - Iza	December 31, 2015	3	5:00	Saitama, Japan	
Draw	11–5–1	Marlon Sandro	Draw (unanimous)	Road FC 025	August 22, 2015	3	5:00	Wonju, South Korea	Featherweight bout.
Win	11–5	Taiyo Nakahara	Submission (guillotine choke)	Road FC 24	July 25, 2015	1	4:38	Tokyo, Japan	
Win	10–5	Wagner Campos	TKO (flying knee and punches)	Road FC 21	February 1, 2015	1	2:18	Seoul, South Korea	
Win	9–5	Issei Tamura	Submission (rear-naked choke)	Road FC 15	May 31, 2015	1	2:41	Wonju, South Korea	
Win	8–5	Motonobu Tezuka	TKO (punches)	Road FC 14	February 9, 2014	1	1:58	Seoul, South Korea	
Loss	7–5	Bibiano Fernandes	Decision (unanimous)	ONE FC: Total Domination	October 18, 2013	5	5:00	Kallang, Singapore	Lost the ONE Bantamweight Championship.
Win	7–4	Leandro Issa	TKO (punches)	ONE FC: Rise of Kings	October 6, 2012	2	0:15	Kallang, Singapore	Won the inaugural ONE Bantamweight Championship.
Win	6–4	Kevin Belingon	Decision (unanimous)	ONE FC: Pride of a Nation	August 31, 2012	3	5:00	Quezon City, Philippines	
Win	5–4	Shōkō Satō	TKO (doctor stoppage)	Road FC 8	June 16, 2012	4	1:27	Wonju, South Korea	
Loss	4–4	Moon Jae-hoon	Decision (unanimous)	Road FC 7	March 24, 2012	3	5:00	Seoul, South Korea	
Loss	4–3	Gustavo Falciroli	Submission (rear-naked choke)	ONE FC: Battle of Heroes	February 11, 2012	1	1:12	Jakarta, Indonesia	
Loss	4-2	Leandro Issa	Decision (unanimous)	ONE FC: Champion vs. Champion	September 3, 2011	3	5:00	Kallang, Singapore	
Win	4–1	Kenta Nakamura	Decision (unanimous)	Road FC 3	July 24, 2011	3	5:00	Seoul, South Korea	
Loss	3–1	Andrew Leone	Submission (guillotine choke)	PRO Fighting 5	July 17, 2011	1	0:28	Taipei, Taiwan	
Win	3–0	So Jae-hyun	Decision (unanimous)	Road FC 2	April 16, 2011	3	5:00	Seoul, South Korea	
Win	2–0	Kim Hyo-ryeong	Submission (guillotine choke)	Road FC 1	October 23, 2010	1	3:10	Seoul, South Korea	Bantamweight debut.
Win	1–0	Yasuhiro Kanayama	Submission (armbar)	Rising On 3	August 8, 2010	1	4:43	Takaishi, Japan	Featherweight debut. Won the ROFC Featherweight Championship.

== See also ==
- List of ONE Championship champions
- List of Road FC champions
- List of current Rizin Fighting Federation fighters
- List of Road FC fighters
- List of male mixed martial artists
