= List of Road FC fighters =

Road FC has many Korean fighters of note, and an international roster of fighters from Japan, Brazil, China, USA and more. In 2015, it signed former UFC fighter and TUF China veteran Lipeng Zhang to a multi-fight contract.

== Champions ==
=== Current champions ===
- (United States) Mighty Mo (openweight champion)
- (South Korea) Jung Hwan Cha (middleweight champion)
- (South Korea) Young Choi (middleweight interim champion)
- (South Korea) A Sol Kwon (lightweight champion)
- (South Korea) Mu Gyeom Choi (featherweight champion)
- (South Korea) Min Jong Song (flyweight champion)
- (South Korea) Seo Hee Ham (women's atomweight champion)

Road FC Current Champion

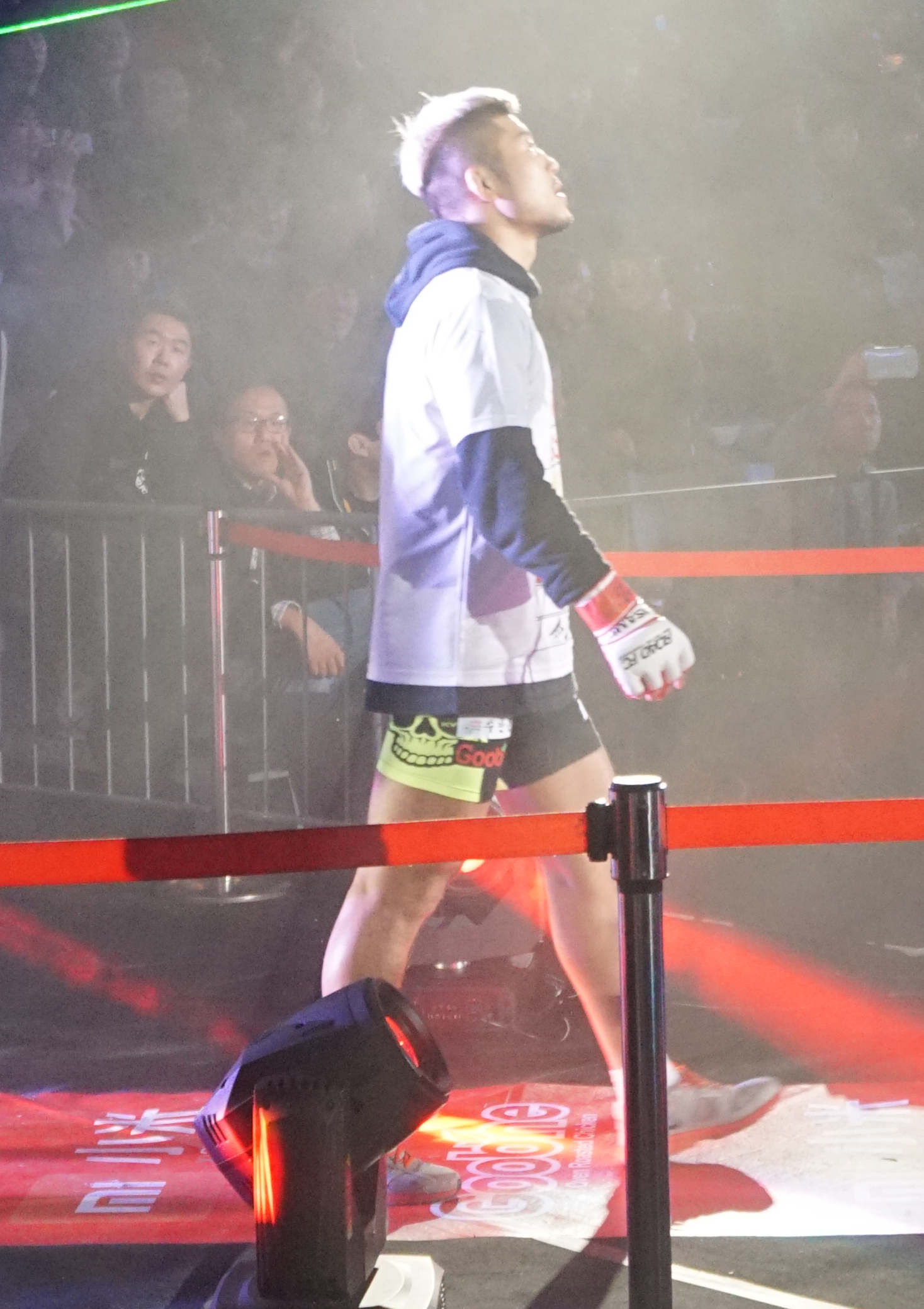
Lightweight
A Sol Kwon

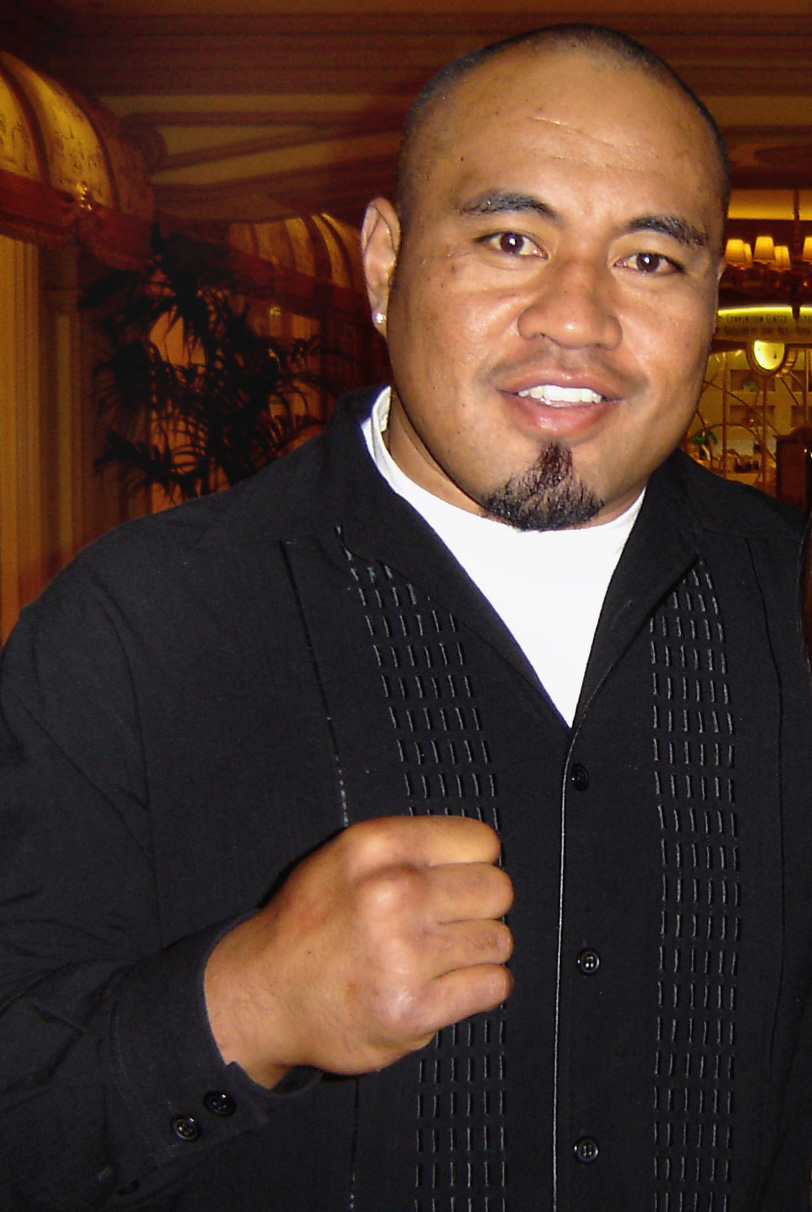
Openweight
Mighty Mo

=== Former champions ===
- (Japan) Riki Fukuda (former middleweight champion)
- (South Korea) Eun Soo Lee (former middleweight champion)
- (Japan) Shungo Oyama (former middleweight champion)
- (South Korea) Yui Chul Nam (former lightweight champion)
- (South Korea) Soo Chul Kim (former bantamweight champion)
- (South Korea) Yoon Jun Lee (former bantamweight champion)
- (South Korea) Kil Woo Lee (former bantamweight champion)
- (South Korea) Kyung Ho Kang (former bantamweight champion)
- (South Korea) Nam Jin Jo (former flyweight champion)

Road FC Former Champion

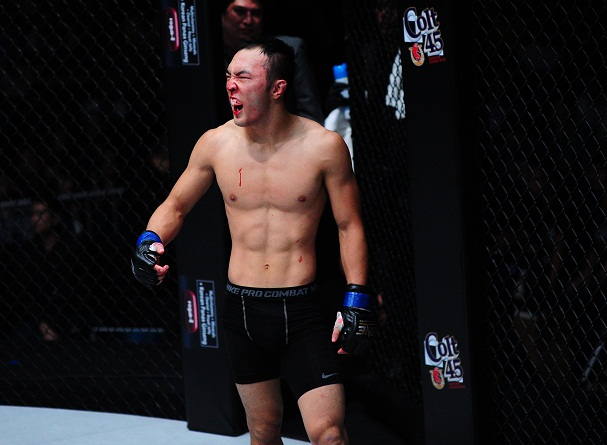
Bantamweight
Su Chul Kim

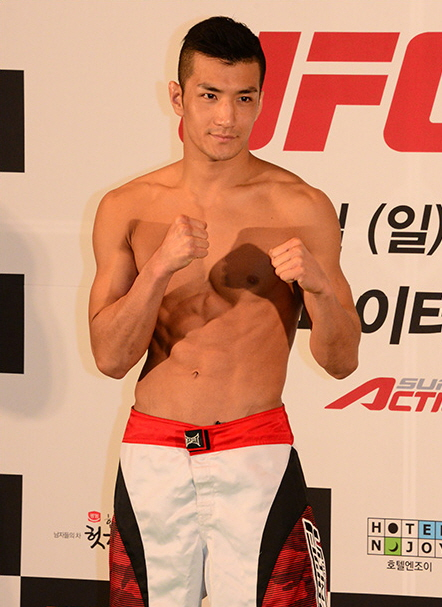
Bantamweight
Kyung Ho Kang

== South Korea ==
- (South Korea) Dong Sik Yoon
- (South Korea) Mu Bae Choi
- (South Korea) Hong Man Choi
- (South Korea) Tae Hyun Bang

South korea

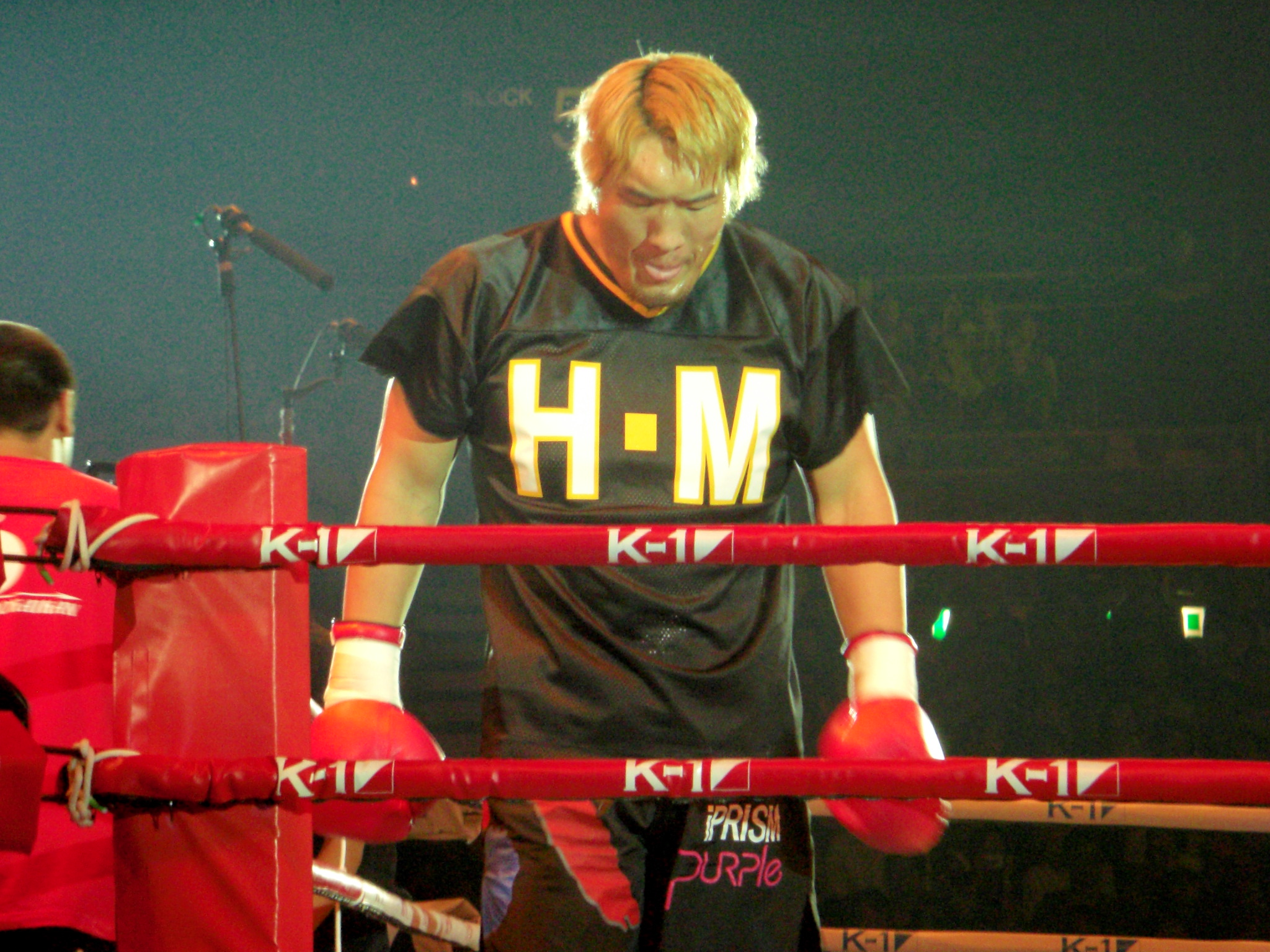
Openweight
Hong Man Choi

== Japan ==
- (Japan) Daiju Takase
- (Japan) Emi Fujino
- (Japan) Takasuke Kume
- (Japan) Issei Tamura
- (Japan) Ikuhisa Minowa
- (Japan) Kazuyuki Fujita
- (Japan) Michihiro Omigawa
- (Japan) Satoko Shinashi
- (Japan) Yusuke Kawaguchi
- (Japan) Takafumi Otsuka
- (Japan) Ryo Kawamura
- (Japan) Takayo Hashi
- (Japan) Mikihito Yamagami

Japan

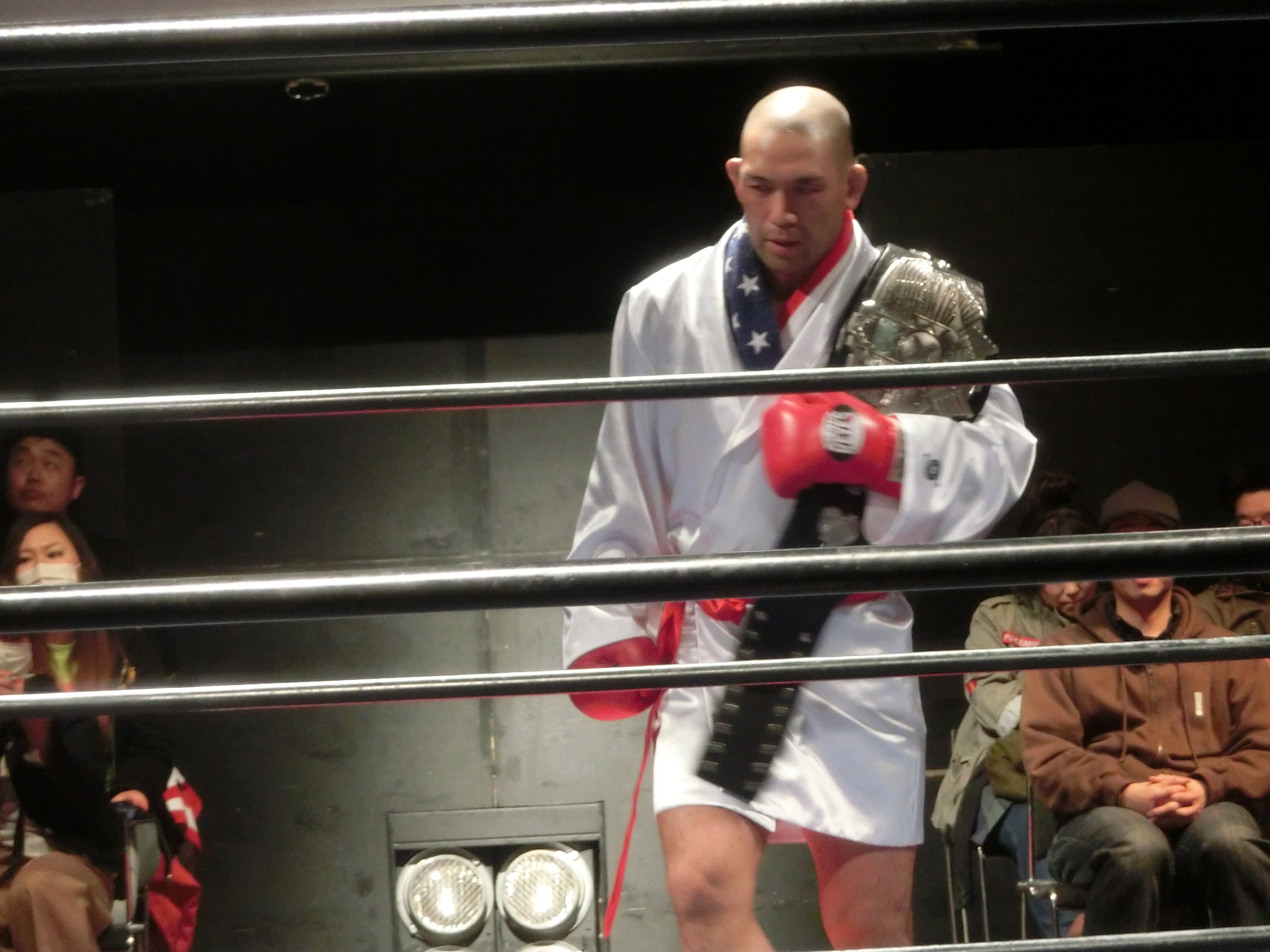
Middleweight
Ryo Kawamura

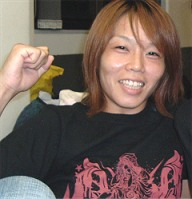
Women's Bantamweight
Takayo Hashi

== China ==
- (China) Jumabieke Tuerxun
- (China) Lipeng Zhang

== Brazil ==
- (Brazil) Gabi Garcia
- (Brazil) Marcos Vinicius
- (Brazil) Marlon Sandro
- (Brazil) Roan Carneiro
- (Brazil) Luis Ramos

== United States ==
- (United States) George Roop
- (United States) Jeff Monson
- (United States) Jinh Yu Frey
- (United States) Marcus Brimage

United States

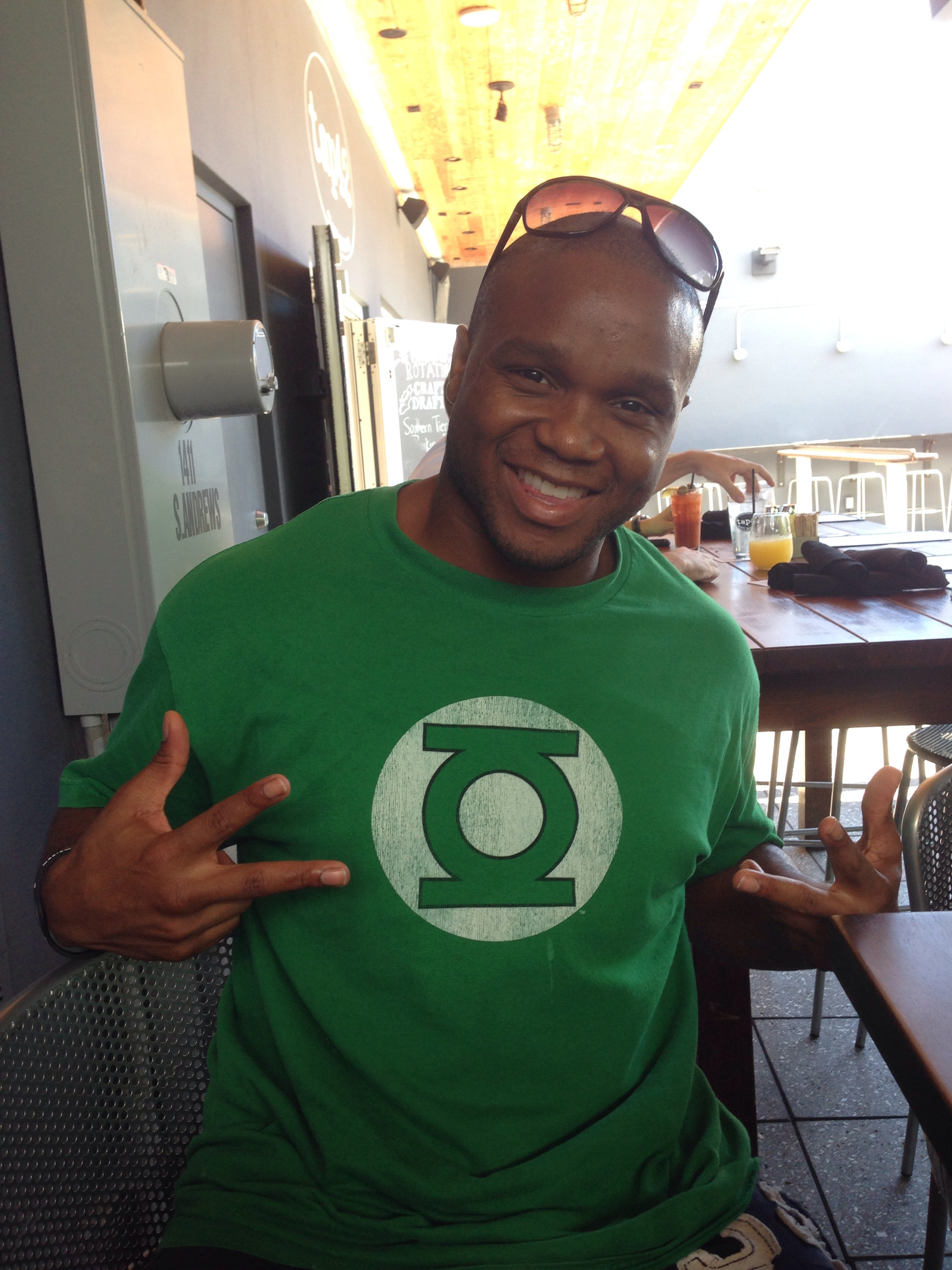
Bantamweight
Marcus Brimage

== Netherlands ==
- (Netherlands) Gilbert Yvel
- (Netherlands) Melvin Manhoef

Netherlands

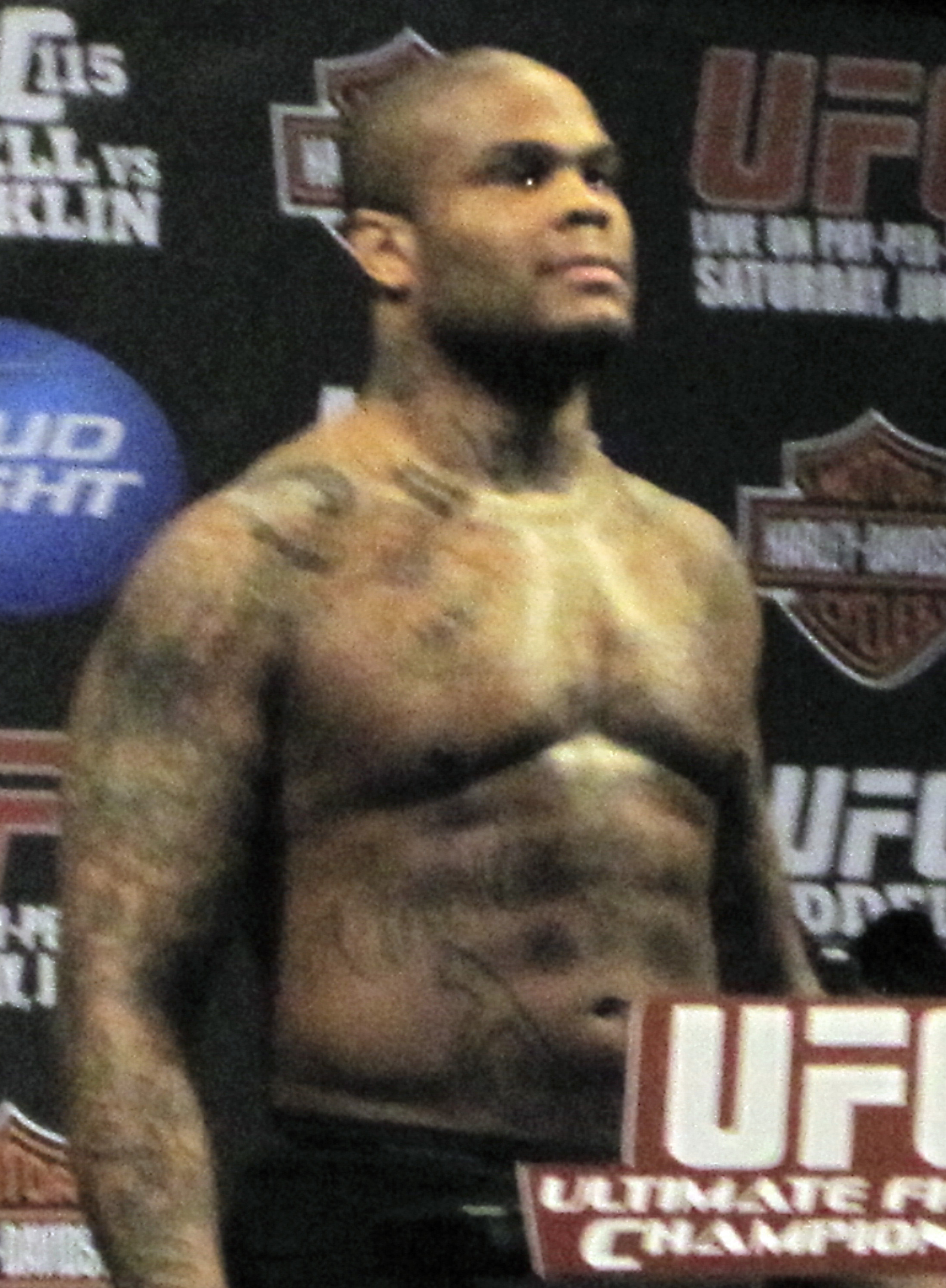
Openweight
Gilbert Yvel

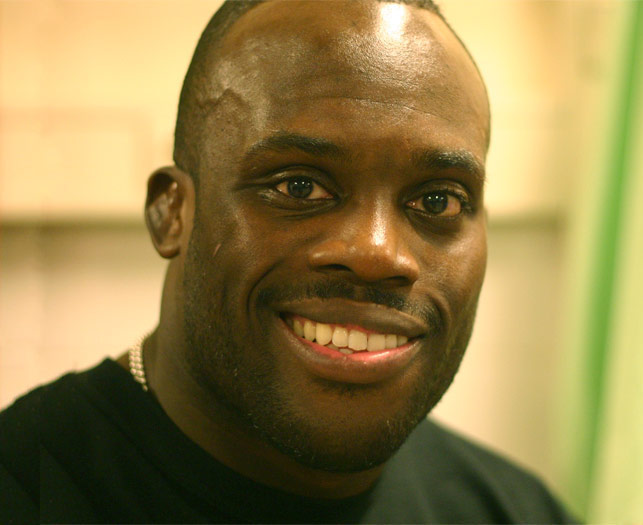
Middleweight
Melvin Manhoef

== Other countries ==
- (Canada) Denis Kang
- (France) Jérôme Le Banner
- (Romania) Alexandru Lungu
- (Norway) Joachim Hansen
- (Russia) Shamil Zavurov
- (South Africa) Vuyisile Colossa
- (Cameroon) Sokoudjou

Other countries

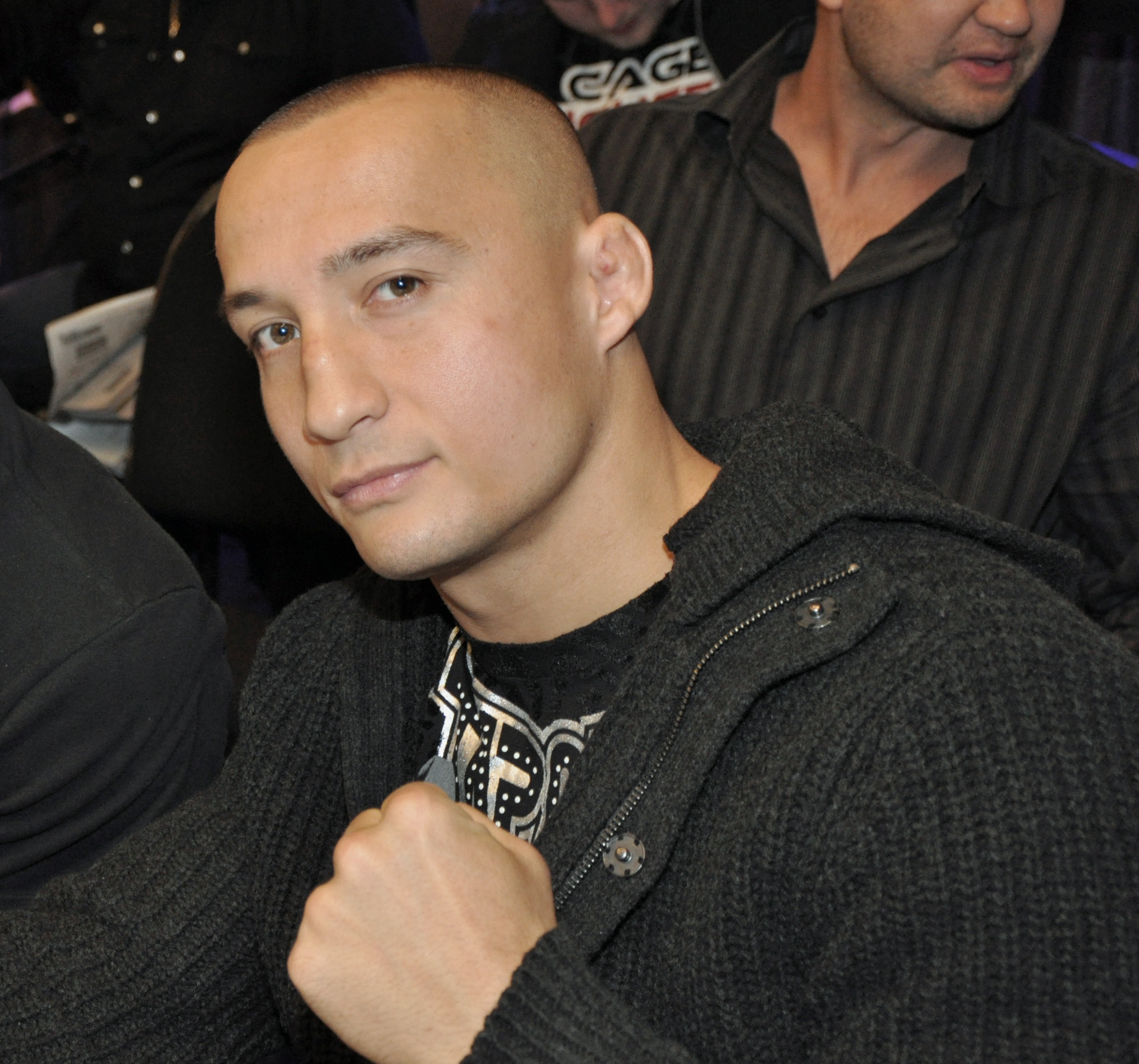
Middleweight
Denis Kang

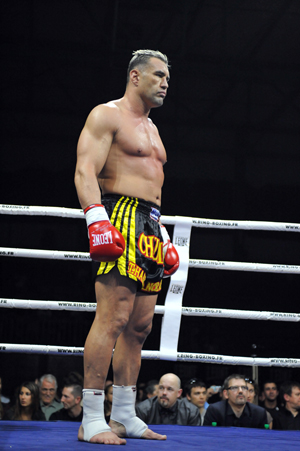
Openweight
Jérôme Le Banner

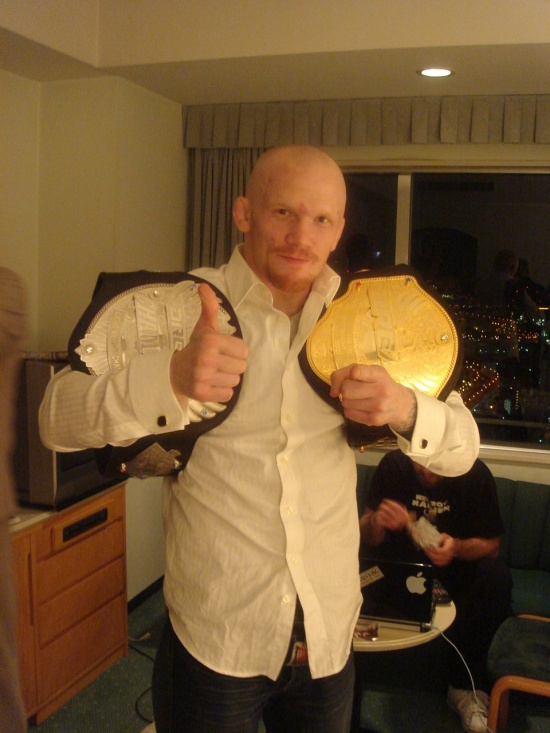
Featherweight
Joachim Hansen

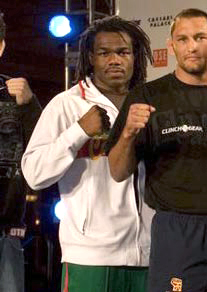
Light heavyweight
Sokoudjou

== See also ==
- List of Road FC champions
- List of Road FC events
- List of current Road FC fighters
- List of current Bellator fighters
- List of current Invicta FC fighters
- List of current Rizin FF fighters
- List of current ONE fighters
- List of current UFC fighters
