= List of Road FC events =

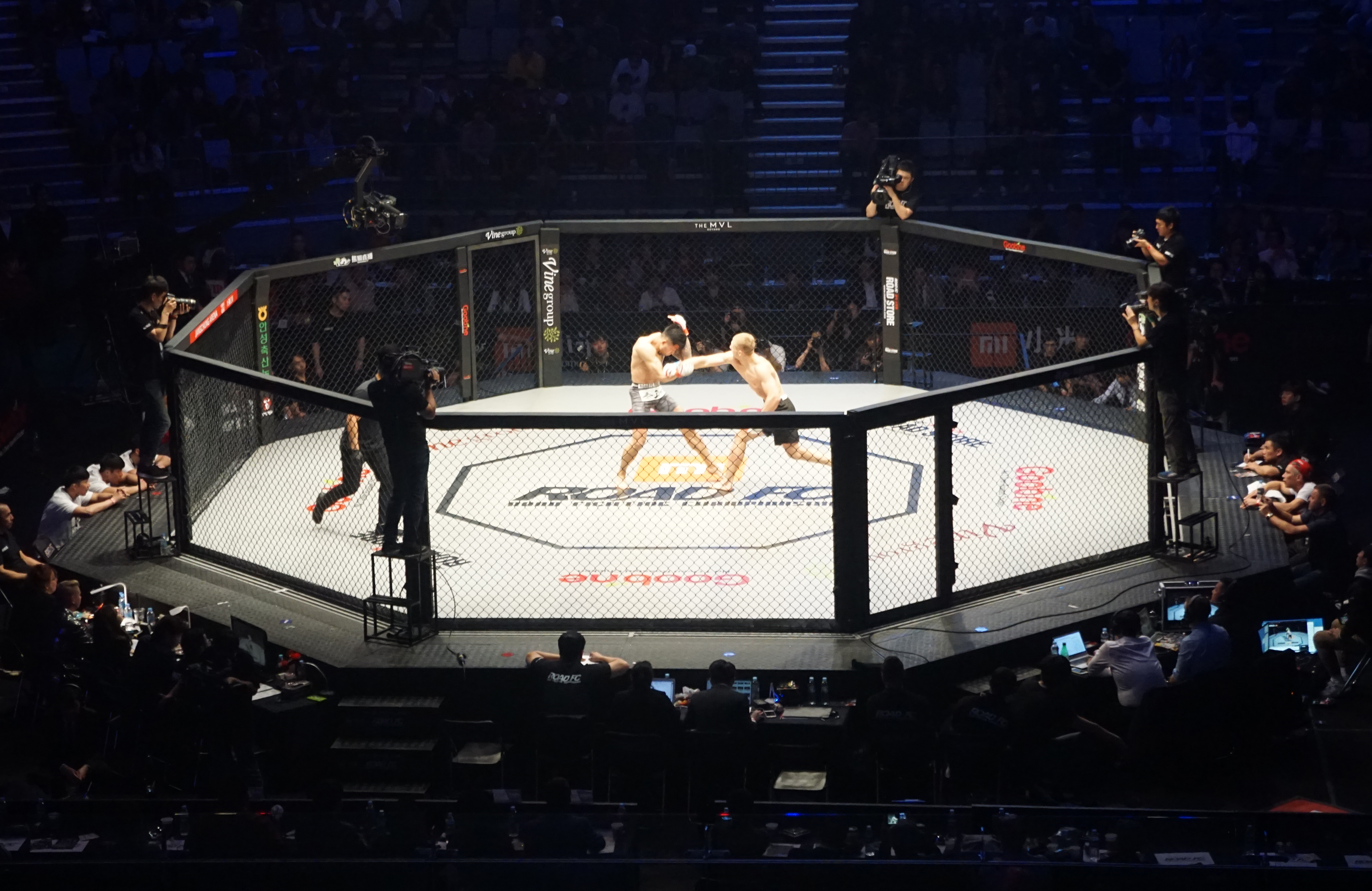
All Road events see fighters compete inside the Cage.

This is a list of events held and scheduled by the Road Fighting Championship (Road FC), a mixed martial arts promotion based in the South Korea. Road FC's first event, Road FC 001: The Resurrection of Champions, took place on October 23, 2010. Each Road FC event contains several fights. Traditionally, every event starts off with a preliminary card (young guns series) followed by a main card, with the last fight being known as the main event.

== Past events ==
#	Event	Main event	Date	Venue	Location	Reference
80	ROAFC FC 69	Park vs. Debana	August 31, 2024	Wonju Gymnasium	(South Korea) Wonju	
79	ROAFC FC 68	Kim vs. Sekino	April 13, 2024	Jangchung Gymnasium	(South Korea) Seoul	
78	ROAFC FC 67	Heo vs. Sekino	December 16, 2023	Swiss Grand Hotel	(South Korea) Seoul	
77	ROAFC FC 66	Kim vs. Haraguchi	October 29, 2023	Chiak Gymnasium	(South Korea) Wonju	
76	ROAFC FC 65	Kim vs. Azevedo	August 26, 2023	Anyang Gymnasium	(South Korea) Anyang	
75	ROAFC FC 64	Kim vs. Indenko	June 24, 2023	Wonju Gymnasium	(South Korea) Wonju	
74	ROAFC FC 63	Hwang vs. Myung	February 25, 2023	Goyang Gymnasium	(South Korea) Goyang	
73	ROAFC FC 62	Si Won Park vs. Je Woo Yeo	December 18, 2022	Swiss Grand Hotel	(South Korea) Seoul	
72	ARC 8	Sergei Choi vs. Kil Soo Lee	November 13, 2022	Lotte World Afreeca Colosseum	(South Korea) Seoul	
71	ROAD FC 61	Park Si-Won vs. Park Seung-Mo	July 23, 2022	Wonju Gymnasium	(South Korea) Wonju	
70	ROAD FC 60	Kwon A-Sol vs. Seol Young Ho	May 13, 2022	Daegu Gymnasium	(South Korea) Daegu	
69	ARC 7	Seol vs. Song	January 18, 2021	Lotte World Afreeca Colosseum	(South Korea) Seoul	
68	ARC 6	Lee vs. Choi	October 30, 2021	Lotte World Afreeca Colosseum	(South Korea) Seoul	
67	ROAD FC 59	Kim vs. Kim	September 4, 2021	Wonju Gymnasium	(South Korea) Wonju	
66	ROAD FC 58	Hwang vs. Oh	July 3, 2021	Changwon Gymnasium	(South Korea) Changwon	
65	ARC 5	Lee vs. Su	June 12, 2021	Lotte World Afreeca Colosseum	(South Korea) Seoul	
64	ARC 4	Oh vs. Park	March 27, 2021	Lotte World Afreeca Colosseum	(South Korea) Seoul	
63	ARC 003	Park vs. Oh	October 17, 2020	Hot6ix Afreeca Colosseum, Lotte World Tower	(South Korea) Seoul	
62	ARC 002	Nandin-Erdene vs. Kim	July 18, 2020	Hot6ix Afreeca Colosseum, Lotte World Tower	(South Korea) Seoul	
61	ARC 001	Heo vs. Bae	May 23, 2020	Hot6ix Afreeca Colosseum, Lotte World Tower	(South Korea) Seoul	
60	Road FC 057 XX	Park vs. Shim	December 14, 2019	Grand Hilton Seoul	Seoul, South Korea	
59	Road FC 056	Zavurov vs. Kwon	November 9, 2019	Jinnam Gymnasium	South Jeolla Province, South Korea	
58	Road FC 055	Lee vs. Park	September 8, 2019	Daegu Gymnasium	Daegu, South Korea	
57	Road FC 054	La vs. Yang	June 15, 2019	Wonju Gymnasium	Wonju, Gangwon-do, South Korea	
56	Road FC 053	Kwon vs. Barnaoui	May 18, 2019	Jeju Halla Gymnasium	Jeju, South Korea	
55	Road FC 052	Zavurov vs. Barnaoui	February 23, 2019	Jangchung Gymnasium	Seoul, South Korea	
54	Road FC 051 XX	Ham vs. Park	December 15, 2018	Convention Centre, Grand Hilton Seoul	Seoul, South Korea	
53	Road FC 050	Choi vs. Lee	November 3, 2018	Daejeon Chungmu Gymnasium	Deajeon, South Korea	
52	Road FC 049: in Paradise	Lee vs. Mizuno	August 18, 2018	Grand Walkerhill Seoul	Seoul, South Korea	
51	Road FC 048	Choi vs. La	July 28, 2018	Wonju Gymnasium	Wonju, Gangwon-do, South Korea	
50	Road FC 047	Aorigele vs. Kim	May 12, 2018	Cadillac Arena	Beijing, China	
49	Road FC 046	Lee vs. Kim	March 10, 2018	Jangchung Gymnasium	Seoul, South Korea	
48	Road FC 045 XX	Ham vs. Yu Frey	December 23, 2017	Convention Centre, Grand Hilton Seoul	Seoul, South Korea	
47	Road FC 044	Aorigele vs. Fujita	November 11, 2017	Hebei Gymnasium	Shijiazhuang, China	
46	Road FC 043	Choi vs. Kim	October 28, 2017	Jangchung Gymnasium	Seoul, South Korea	
45	Road FC 042 x Chungju World Martial Arts Festival	Aorigele vs. Masuda	September 23, 2017	Chungju World Martial Arts Festival Stadium	Chungju, South Korea	
44	Road FC 041	Myung vs. Barnett	August 12, 2017	Wonju Gymnasium	Wonju, South Korea	
43	Road FC 040	Mo vs. Kang	July 15, 2017	Jangchung Gymnasium	Seoul, South Korea	
42	Road FC 039	Ham vs. Kurobe	June 10, 2017	Jangchung Gymnasium	Seoul, South Korea	
41	Road FC 038	Kim vs. Kim	April 15, 2017	Jangchung Gymnasium	Seoul, South Korea	
40	Road FC 037 XX	Raika vs. Kang	March 11, 2017	Convention Centre, Grand Hilton Seoul	Seoul, South Korea	
39	Road FC 036	Fukuda vs. Kim	February 11, 2017	Jangchung Gymnasium	Seoul, South Korea	
38	Road FC 035	Kwon vs. Sasaki	December 10, 2016	Jangchung Gymnasium	Seoul, South Korea	
37	Road FC 034	Choi vs. Kazgan	November 19, 2016	Hebei Gymnasium	Shijiazhuang, China	
36	Road FC 033	Mo vs. Choi	September 24, 2016	Jangchung Gymnasium	Seoul, South Korea	
35	Road FC 032	Aorigele vs. Sapp	July 2, 2016	Hunan International Convention & Exhibition Centre	Changsha, China	
34	Road FC 031	Lee vs. Roop	May 14, 2016	Jangchung Gymnasium	Seoul, South Korea	
33	Road FC 030: In China	Choi vs. Aorigele	April 16, 2016	Beijing Workers' Gymnasium	Beijing, China	
32	Road FC 029	Choi vs. Sandro	March 12, 2016	Wonju Chiak Gymnasium	Wonju, South Korea	
31	Road FC 028	Cha vs. Fukuda	January 31, 2016	Jangchung Gymnasium	Seoul, South Korea	
30	Road FC 027: In China	Choi vs. Luo	December 26, 2015	Shanghai Oriental Sports Center	Shanghai, China	
29	Road FC 026	Song vs. Jo	October 9, 2015	Jangchung Gymnasium	Seoul, South Korea	
28	Road FC 025	Lee vs. Choi	August 22, 2015	Wonju Chiak Gymnasium	Wonju, South Korea	
27	Road FC 024: In Japan	Fukuda vs. Jeon	July 25, 2015	Ariake Coliseum	Tokyo, Japan	
26	Road FC 023	Lee vs. Moon	May 2, 2015	Jangchung Gymnasium	Seoul, South Korea	
25	Road FC 022	Kwon vs. Lee	March 21, 2015	Jangchung Gymnasium	Seoul, South Korea	
24	Road FC 021: Champions Day	Choi vs. Seo	February 1, 2015	Jangchung Gymnasium	Seoul, South Korea	
23	Road FC 020	Lee vs. Lee	December 14, 2014	Olympic Hall, Olympic Park	Seoul, South Korea	
22	Road FC 019	Fukuda vs. Lee	November 9, 2014	Olympic Hall, Olympic Park	Seoul, South Korea	
21	Road FC 018	Kim vs. Lamos	August 30, 2014	Convention Centre, Grand Hilton Seoul	Seoul, South Korea	
20	Road FC 017	Kwon vs. Kume	August 17, 2014	Olympic Hall	Seoul, South Korea	
19	Road FC 016	Jo vs. Song	July 27, 2014	Gumi Indoor Gymnasium	Gumi, South Korea	
18	Road FC 015	Seo vs. Hansen	May 31, 2014	Wonju Chiak Gymnasium	Wonju, South Korea	
17	Road FC Korea 003: Korea vs. Brazil	Kwon vs. Diniz	April 6, 2014	The-K Hotel Seoul	Seoul, South Korea	
16	Road FC Korea 002: Korea vs. Japan	Lee vs. Terashima	March 9, 2014	Convention Centre, Grand Hilton Seoul	Seoul, South Korea	
15	Road FC 014	Choi vs. Kwon	February 9, 2014	Olympic Hall, Olympic Park	Seoul, South Korea	
14	Road FC Korea 001	Fukuda vs. Kim	January 18, 2014	Convention Centre, Grand Hilton Seoul	Seoul, South Korea	
13	Road FC 013	Nam vs. Kume	October 12, 2013	Gumi Indoor Gymnasium	Gumi, South Korea	
12	Road FC 012	Lee vs. Song	June 22, 2013	Wonju Chiak Gymnasium	Wonju, South Korea	
11	Road FC 011	Nam vs. Kume	April 13, 2013	Olympic Hall, Olympic Park	Seoul, South Korea	
10	Road FC 010: In Busan	Lee vs. Oyama	November 24, 2012	Auditorium, BEXCO	Busan, South Korea	
9	Road FC 009: Beat Down	Manhoef vs. Kim	September 15, 2012	Wonju Chiak Gymnasium	Wonju, South Korea	
8	Road FC 008: Final 4 Bitter Rivals	Kang vs. Leone	June 16, 2012	Wonju Chiak Gymnasium	Wonju, South Korea	
7	Road FC 007: Recharged	Kang vs. Sato	March 24, 2012	Jangchung Gymnasium	Seoul, South Korea	
6	Road FC 006: Final 4	Oyama vs. Son	February 5, 2012	Jangchung Gymnasium	Seoul, South Korea	
5	Road FC 005: Night of Champions	Oyama vs. Kang	December 3, 2011	Jangchung Gymnasium	Seoul, South Korea	
4	Road FC 004: Young Guns	Lee vs. Kim	October 3, 2011	Convention Centre, Grand Hilton Seoul	Seoul, South Korea	
3	Road FC 003: Explosion	Wi vs. Kang	July 24, 2011	Convention Centre, Grand Hilton Seoul	Seoul, South Korea	
2	Road FC 002: Alive	Kang vs. Lee	April 16, 2011	Convention Centre, Grand Hilton Seoul	Seoul, South Korea	
1	Road FC 001: The Resurrection of Champions	Nam vs. Okazawa	October 23, 2010	Event Hall, Seoul Fashion Center	Seoul, South Korea	

== Number of events by year ==
As of Road FC 057 x Road FC XX.

== See also ==
- List of Road FC champions
- List of current Road FC fighters
