= 2012 in Road FC =

Mixed martial arts events

Information
- Promotion: Road Fighting Championship
- First date: February 5, 2012
- Last date: November 24, 2012

Events
- Total events: 5

Fights
- Total fights: 62
- Title fights: 3

Chronology
2011 in Road FC	2012 in Road FC	2013 in Road FC

The year 2012 was the 3rd year in the history of the Road Fighting Championship, an MMA promotion based in South Korea. 2012 started with Road FC 006: Final 4 and ended with Road FC 010: In Busan.

== List of events ==
#	Event Title	Main Event	Date	Arena	Location
5	Road FC 010: In Busan	Lee vs. Oyama	November 24, 2012	Auditorium, BEXCO	(South Korea) Busan
4	Road FC 009: Beat Down	Manhoef vs. Kim	September 15, 2012	Wonju Chiak Gymnasium	(South Korea) Wonju, Gangwon
3	Road FC 008: Final 4 Bitter Rivals	Kang vs. Leone	June 16, 2012	Wonju Chiak Gymnasium	(South Korea) Wonju, Gangwon
2	Road FC 007: Recharged	Kang vs. Sato	March 24, 2012	Jangchung Gymnasium	(South Korea) Seoul
1	Road FC 006: Final 4	Oyama vs. Son	February 5, 2012	Jangchung Gymnasium	(South Korea) Seoul

== Road FC 010: In Busan ==
Road FC 010: In Busan

Information
- Promotion: Road Fighting Championship
- Date: November 24, 2012
- Venue: Auditorium, BEXCO
- City: (South Korea) Busan

Event chronology
Road FC 009: Beat Down	Road FC 010: In Busan	Road FC 011

Road FC 010: In Busan was an MMA event held by the Road FC on November 24, 2012 at the Auditorium, BEXCO in Busan, South Korea.

=== Results ===
Main card
Weight class				Method	Round	Time	Notes
Middleweight	(South Korea) Eun Soo Lee	def.	(Japan) Shungo Oyama (c)	TKO (punches)	1	2:48	(Note: For the Road FC Middleweight Championship)
-97.5 kg Catchweight	(Russia) Jeff Monson	def.	(South Korea) Dong Kuk Kang	Decision (3-0)	3	5:00
Lightweight	(South Korea) Yui Chul Nam	def.	(South Africa) Vuyisile Colossa	Decision (2-1)	3	5:00	(Note: Road FC Lightweight tournament semi-finals)
Lightweight	(Japan) Takasuke Kume	def.	(South Korea) Chul Yoon	Submission (rear naked choke)	1	2:19	(Note: Road FC Lightweight tournament semi-finals)
Light Heavyweight	(South Korea) Jin Soo Yuk	def.	(Japan) Kaname Oowaki	TKO (punches)	2	0:23
Middleweight	(South Korea) Jung Kyo Park	def.	(South Korea) Kyung Kwan Ryu	Submission (kimura lock)	1	2:33
Young Guns 006
Weight class				Method	Round	Time	Notes
Middleweight	(South Korea) Il Chul Park	def.	(South Korea) Hye Seok Son	Decision (3-0)	2	5:00
Featherweight	(South Korea) Yoon Heo	def.	(South Korea) Young Sam Jung	TKO (punches)	1	2:33
Bantamweight	(South Korea) Je Hoon Moon	def.	(South Korea) Sung Jae Kim	Decision (3-0)	2	5:00
Featherweight	(South Korea) Mu Gyeom Choi	def.	(South Korea) Min Joo Jung	Decision (3-0)	2	5:00
Bantamweight	(South Korea) Jun Hoe Jung	def.	(South Korea) Yi Moon Han	Decision (3-0)	2	5:00
Bantamweight	(Brazil) Alan Yoshihiro	def.	(South Korea) Hyun Sung Kim	Submission (rear naked choke)	2	2:12
Bantamweight	(South Korea) Jung Gi Hong	def.	(South Korea) Young Jun Kim	TKO (punches)	2	2:56
Featherweight	(South Korea) Ok Myung Kim	def.	(South Korea) Jae Hak Yoo	Submission (rear naked choke)	1	1:01

== Road FC 009: Beat Down ==
Road FC 009: Beat Down

Information
- Promotion: Road Fighting Championship
- Date: September 15, 2012
- Venue: Wonju Chiak Gymnasium
- City: (South Korea) Wonju, Gangwon

Event chronology
Road FC 008: Final 4 Bitter Rivals	Road FC 009: Beat Down	Road FC 010: In Busan

Road FC 009: Beat Down was an MMA event held by the Road FC on September 15, 2012 at the Wonju Chiak Gymnasium in Wonju, Gangwon, South Korea.

=== Results ===
Main card
Weight class				Method	Round	Time	Notes
Middleweight	(Netherlands) Melvin Manhoef	def.	(South Korea) Jae Young Kim	Decision (2-1)	3	5:00
-85.5 kg Catchweight	(Japan) Minowaman	def.	(South Korea) Jin Soo Yuk	Submission (kimura lock)	1	4:59
Lightweight	(South Korea) Yui Chul Nam	def.	(Japan) Masahiro Toryu	TKO (punches)	1	3:32	(Note: Road FC Lightweight tournament quarter-finals)
Lightweight	(Japan) Takasuke Kume	def.	(South Korea) Chang Hyun Kim	Submission (rear naked choke)	1	3:27	(Note: Road FC Lightweight tournament quarter-finals)
Lightweight	(South Africa) Vuyisile Colossa	def.	(South Korea) Seok Mo Kim	TKO (kness & punches)	1	4:31	(Note: Road FC Lightweight tournament quarter-finals)
Lightweight	(South Korea) Yong Jae Lee	def.	(South Korea) Won Gi Kim	TKO (body kick & punches)	3	2:33	(Note: Road FC Lightweight tournament quarter-finals)
Young Guns 005
Weight class				Method	Round	Time	Notes
Featherweight	(South Korea) Young Bok Kil	def.	(South Korea) Jung Won Lee	Decision (3-0)	2	5:00
Featherweight	(South Korea) Young Sam Jung	def.	(South Korea) Tae Ho Jin	Decision (3-0)	2	5:00
Lightweight	(South Korea) Hwi Kyu Kim	def.	(South Korea) Jong Hwa Lee	Decision (3-0)	2	5:00
Bantamweight	(South Korea) Myung Sik Kwak	def.	(South Korea) Gwang Soo Park	Submission (rear naked choke)	1	2:59
Middleweight	(South Korea) Il Chul Park	def.	(South Korea) Young Woo Yoo	Decision (3-0)	2	5:00

== Road FC 008: Final 4 Bitter Rivals ==
Road FC 008: Final 4 Bitter Rivals

Information
- Promotion: Road Fighting Championship
- Date: June 16, 2012
- Venue: Wonju Chiak Gymnasium
- City: (South Korea) Wonju, Gangwon

Event chronology
Road FC 007: Recharged	Road FC 008: Final 4 Bitter Rivals	Road FC 009: Beat Down

Road FC 008: Final 4 Bitter Rivals was an MMA event held by the Road FC on June 16, 2012 at the Wonju Chiak Gymnasium in Wonju, Gangwon, South Korea.

=== Results ===
Main card
Weight class				Method	Round	Time	Notes
Bantamweight	(South Korea) Kyung Ho Kang	def.	(United States) Andrew Leone	Submission (rear naked choke)	2	1:19	(Note: For the inaugural Road FC Bantamweight Championship)
Middleweight	(Canada) Denis Kang	def.	(South Korea) Jung Won Lee	KO (punch)	1	4:57
Openweight	(South Korea) Jong Dae Kim	def.	(United States) Bob Sapp	TKO (punches)	2	1:58
Featherweight	(South Korea) Doo Won Seo	def.	(Japan) Toru Harai	Decision (2-0)	3	5:00
Bantamweight	(South Korea) Soo Chul Kim	def.	(Japan) Shoko Sato	TKO (doctor stop)	4	1:27	(Note: Reserve Fight for the Road FC Bantamweight tournament)
Bantamweight	(South Korea) Kyung Ho Kang	def.	(South Korea) Je Hoon Moon	Submission (rear naked choke)	2	4:27	(Note: Road FC Bantamweight tournament semi-finals)
Bantamweight	(United States) Andrew Leone	def.	(South Korea) Min Jong Song	Decision (2-1)	3	5:00	(Note: Road FC Bantamweight tournament semi-finals)
Young Guns 004
Weight class				Method	Round	Time	Notes
Featherweight	(South Korea) Young Sam Jung	def.	(Brazil) Francisco Costa	TKO (punches)	2	2:18
Middleweight	(South Korea) Hee Seung Kim	def.	(South Korea) Eun Soo Kim	Submission (rear naked choke)	1	4:33
Light heavyweight	(South Korea) Nae Chul Kim	def.	(South Korea) Il Chul Park	Decision (3-0)	2	5:00
Lightweight	(South Korea) Jun Hee Moon	def.	(South Korea) Seok Mo Kim	Submission (gogoplata)	1	4:57	(Note: Skirmish for the Road FC Lightweight tournament)
Lightweight	(South Korea) Yong Jae Lee	def.	(South Korea) Hyung Seok Lee	TKO (punches)	1	4:16	(Note: Skirmish for the Road FC Lightweight tournament)
Lightweight	(South Korea) Won Gi Kim	def.	(South Korea) Sung Jin Hong	Decision (3-0)	2	5:00	(Note: Skirmish for the Road FC Lightweight tournament)

==== Tournament Pair Assignment for selecting the first Champion in Road FC Bantamweight Division ====
Quarter-finals; Road FC 006 (2012-02-05); Road FC 007 (2012-03-24)
(South Korea) Andrew Leone	DEC
(South Korea) Kyung Ho Kang	3-0
(South Korea) Min Jong Song	DEC
(South Korea) Jae Hyun So	3-0
(South Korea) Je Hoon Moon	DEC
(South Korea) Soo Chul Kim	3-0
(Japan) Kyung Ho Kang	SUB
(Canada) Shoko Sato	2R

Semi-finals; Road FC 008 (2012-06-16)
(South Korea) Andrew Leone	DEC
(South Korea) Min Jong Song	2-1
(South Korea) Je Hoon Moon	2R
(Japan) Kyung Ho Kang	SUB

Final; Road FC 008 (2012-06-16)
(South Korea) Andrew Leone	2R
(Japan) Kyung Ho Kang	SUB

== Road FC 007: Recharged ==
Road FC 007: Recharged

Information
- Promotion: Road Fighting Championship
- Date: March 24, 2012
- Venue: Jangchung Gymnasium
- City: (South Korea) Seoul

Event chronology
Road FC 006: Final 4	Road FC 007: Recharged	Road FC 008: Final 4 Bitter Rivals

Road FC 007: Recharged was an MMA event held by the Road FC on March 24, 2012 at the Jangchung Gymnasium in Seoul, South Korea.

=== Results ===
Main card
Weight class				Method	Round	Time	Notes
Bantamweight	(South Korea) Kyung Ho Kang	def.	(Japan) Shoko Sato	Submission (armbar)	2	2:38	(Note: Road FC Bantamweight tournament quarter-finals)
Bantamweight	(South Korea) Je Hoon Moon	def.	(South Korea) Soo Chul Kim	Decision (3-0)	3	5:00	(Note: Road FC Bantamweight tournament quarter-finals)
-80 kg Catchweight	(Brazil) Roan Carneiro	def.	(South Korea) Jung Hwan Cha	Technical Submission (armbar)	1	4:41
Lightweight	(Japan) Takasuke Kume	def.	(South Korea) Hyung Seok Lee	Submission (armbar)	2	0:54
Bantamweight	(South Korea) Min Jong Song	def.	(South Korea) Jae Hyun So	Decision (3-0)	3	5:00	(Note: Road FC Bantamweight tournament quarter-finals)
Light Heavyweight	(Canada) Tommy Kang	def.	(South Korea) Gyu Seok Son	KO (punch)	2	2:23
Young Guns 003
Weight class				Method	Round	Time	Notes
Light Heavyweight	(South Korea) Nae Chul Kim	def.	(South Korea) Jae Hyun Choi	TKO (knee)	2	2:02
Lightweight	(South Korea) Seok Mo Kim	def.	(South Korea) Hyung Ryul Kim	TKO (punches)	1	0:38	(Note: Skirmish for the Road FC Lightweight tournament)
Lightweight	(South Korea) Won Gi Kim	vs.	(South Korea) Sung Jin Hong	Draw (1-1)	2	5:00	(Note: Skirmish for the Road FC Lightweight tournament)
Lightweight	(South Korea) Jun Hee Moon	def.	(South Korea) Sang Hyun Lee	Submission (triangle choke)	2	0:48	(Note: Skirmish for the Road FC Lightweight tournament)
Lightweight	(South Korea) Hwi Kyu Kim	def.	(South Korea) Sang Il Lee	Decision (3-0)	2	5:00	(Note: Skirmish for the Road FC Lightweight tournament)
Lightweight	(South Korea) Yong Jae Lee	def.	(South Korea) Mu Gyeom Choi	Decision (3-0)	2	5:00	(Note: Skirmish for the Road FC Lightweight tournament)

== Road FC 006: Final 4 ==
Road FC 006: Final 4

Information
- Promotion: Road Fighting Championship
- Date: February 5, 2012
- Venue: Jangchung Gymnasium
- City: (South Korea) Seoul

Event chronology
Road FC 005: Night of Champions	Road FC 006: Final 4	Road FC 007: Recharged

ROAD FC 006: Final 4 was an MMA event held by the Road FC on February 5, 2012 at the Jangchung Gymnasium in Seoul, South Korea.

=== Results ===
Main card
Weight class				Method	Round	Time	Notes
Middleweight	(Japan) Shungo Oyama	def.	(South Korea) Hye Seok Son	TKO (punches)	1	2:10	(Note: For the inaugural Road FC Middleweight Championship)
Bantamweight	(South Korea) Yi Moon Han	def.	(South Korea) Jung Won Lee	Decision (3-0)	3	5:00
Bantamweight	(United States) Andrew Leone	def.	(South Korea) Kyung Ho Kang	Technical Decision (3-0)	3	5:00	(Note: Road FC Bantamweight tournament quarter-finals)
Middleweight	(South Korea) Jae Young Kim	def.	(South Korea) Hee Seung Kim	Submission (north-south choke)	3	4:33	(Note: Reserve Fight for the Road FC Middleweight tournament)
Middleweight	(Japan) Shungo Oyama	def.	(South Korea) Jong Dae Kim	Submission (heel hook)	1	1:44	(Note: Road FC Middleweight tournament semi-finals)
Middleweight	(South Korea) Hye Seok Son	def.	(South Korea) Eun Soo Lee	TKO (punches)	2	0:28	(Note: Road FC Middleweight tournament semi-finals)
Young Guns 002
Weight class				Method	Round	Time	Notes
-90 kg Catchweight	(South Korea) Eun Soo Kim	def.	(South Korea) Sang Soo Lee	TKO (punches)	1	2:42
Lightweight	(South Korea) Seok Mo Kim	def.	(South Korea) Jung Min Kang	TKO (leg kick)	2	2:38
Featherweight	(South Korea) Hyung Seok Lee	def.	(South Korea) Choong Il Jeon	Submission (guillotine choke)	2	3:31
Bantamweight	(South Korea) Jae Hyeon So	def.	(South Korea) Myung Sik Kwak	Decision (3-0)	2	5:00	(Note: Road FC Bantamweight tournament 1/8)
Bantamweight	(South Korea) Dae Hwan Kim B	def.	(South Korea) Gwang Soo Park	Decision (3-0)	2	5:00	(Note: Road FC Bantamweight tournament 1/8)
Bantamweight	(South Korea) Je Hoon Moon	def.	(South Korea) Jin Seok Jeong	TKO (punches)	1	0:39	(Note: Road FC Bantamweight tournament 1/8)

==== Tournament Pair Assignment for selecting the first Champion in Road FC Middleweight Division ====
Quarter-finals; Road FC 004 (2011-10-03); Road FC 005 (2011-12-03)
(South Korea) Hye Seok Son	TKO
(South Korea) Jung Kyo Park	1R
(South Korea) Eun Soo Lee	DEC
(South Korea) Jae Yeong Kim	3-0
(South Korea) Jong Dae Kim	TKO
(South Korea) Dool Hee Lee	1R
(Japan) Shungo Oyama	TKO
(Canada) Denis Kang	1R

Semi-finals; Road FC 006 (2012-02-05)
(South Korea) Hye Seok Son	TKO
(South Korea) Eun Soo Lee	2R
(South Korea) Jong Dae Kim	1R
(Japan) Shungo Oyama	SUB

Final; Road FC 006 (2012-02-05)
(South Korea) Hye Seok Son	1R
(Japan) Shungo Oyama	TKO

== See also ==
- List of Road FC events
- List of Road FC champions
- List of current Road FC fighters
- List of current mixed martial arts champions
