= 2013 in Road FC =

Mixed martial arts events

Information
- Promotion: Road Fighting Championship
- First date: April 13, 2013
- Last date: October 12, 2013

Events
- Total events: 3

Fights
- Total fights: 31
- Title fights: 3

Chronology
2012 in Road FC	2013 in Road FC	2014 in Road FC

The year 2013 was the 4th year in the history of the Road Fighting Championship, an MMA promotion based in South Korea. 2013 started with Road FC 011 and ended with Road FC 013.

== List of events ==
#	Event Title	Main event	Date	Arena	Location
3	Road FC 013	Nam vs. Kume	October 12, 2013	Gumi Indoor Gymnasium	(South Korea) Gumi, Gyeongbuk
2	Road FC 012	Lee vs. Song	June 22, 2013	Wonju Chiak Gymnasium	(South Korea) Wonju, Gangwon
1	Road FC 011	Nam vs. Kume	April 13, 2013	Olympic Hall, Olympic Park	(South Korea) Seoul

== Road FC 013 ==
Road FC 013

Information
- Promotion: Road Fighting Championship
- Date: October 12, 2013
- Venue: Gumi Indoor Gymnasium
- City: (South Korea) Gumi, Gyeongbuk

Event chronology
Road FC 012	Road FC 013	Road FC 014

Road FC 013 was an MMA event held by the Road FC on October 12, 2013 at the Gumi Indoor Gymnasium in Gumi, South Korea.

=== Results ===
Main card
Weight class				Method	Round	Time	Notes
Lightweight	(South Korea) Yui Chul Nam (c)	def.	(Japan) Takasuke Kume	Decision (3-0)	3	5:00	(Note: For the Road FC Lightweight Championship)
Welterweight	(Brazil) Andrews Nakahara	def.	(South Korea) Jung Hwan Cha	Decision (3-0)	3	5:00
Middleweight	(Japan) Minowaman	def.	(South Korea) Hoon Kim	KO (punch)	1	3:38
Bantamweight	(South Korea) Min Jong Song	def.	(Japan) Issei Tamura	Submission (rear naked choke)	3	4:03
Lightweight	(Japan) Koji Nakamura	def.	(South Korea) A Sol Kwon	KO (head kick & punch)	2	3:08
Young Guns 009
Weight class				Method	Round	Time	Notes
Featherweight	(South Korea) Bae Yong Kwon	def.	(Japan) Kosuke Umeda	TKO (flying knee & punches)	1	1:41	(Note: Road FC Featherweight tournament semi-finals)
Featherweight	(South Korea) Young Bok Kil	vs.	(South Korea) Mu Gyeom Choi	Cancelled bout (kil missed weight)	-	-	(Note: Road FC Featherweight tournament semi-finals)
Bantamweight	(South Korea) Yoon Jun Lee	def.	(Japan) Makoto Kamaya	Decision (3-0)	2	5:00
Featherweight	(South Korea) Yoon Heo	def.	(South Korea) Byung Ok Cho	Decision (3-0)	2	5:00
Middleweight	(South Korea) Uh Jin Jeon	def.	(South Korea) Jae Woong Yoon	TKO (punches)	1	0:21
Bantamweight	(South Korea) Yi Moon Han	def.	(South Korea) Hyo Ryong Kim	Decision (3-0)	2	5:00
Flyweight	(South Korea) Sung Jae Kim	def.	(South Korea) Kyu Hwa Kim	KO (flying knee)	2	3:06

== Road FC 012 ==
Road FC 012

Information
- Promotion: Road Fighting Championship
- Date: June 22, 2013
- Venue: Wonju Chiak Gymnasium
- City: (South Korea) Wonju, Gangwon

Event chronology
Road FC 011	Road FC 012	Road FC 013

Road FC 012 was an MMA event held by the Road FC on June 22, 2013 at the Wonju Chiak Gymnasium in Wonju, Gangwon, South Korea.

=== Results ===
Main card
Weight class				Method	Round	Time	Notes
Bantamweight	(South Korea) Kil Woo Lee	def.	(Japan) Min Jong Song	Decision (2-1)	3	5:00	(Note: For the Road FC Bantamweight Championship)
Welterweight	(South Korea) Myung Ho Bae	def.	(Brazil) Andrews Nakahara	Decision (1-0)	3	5:00
Featherweight	(South Korea) Bae Yong Kwon	def.	(Japan) Michihiro Omigawa	Decision (2-1)	2	5:00	(Note: Road FC Featherweight tournament quarter-finals)
Woman's Featherweight	(Norway) Celine Haga	def.	(Japan) Masako Yoshida	Submission (rear naked choke)	1	4:02
Middleweight	(South Korea) Dool Hee Lee	def.	(Japan) Ryo Kawamura	Decision (2-1)	3	5:00
Light Heavyweight	(Japan) Ryuta Noji	def.	(South Korea) Ji Hoon Kim	TKO (punches)	2	3:01
Young Guns 008
Weight class				Method	Round	Time	Notes
Bantamweight	(South Korea) Yoon Jun Lee	def.	(Japan) Takafumi Otsuka	Decision (3-0)	3	5:00
Featherweight	(South Korea) Chang Hyun Kim	vs.	(Japan) Kosuke Umeda	Cancelled bout (kim missed weight)	-	-	(Note: Road FC Featherweight tournament quarter-finals)
Featherweight	(South Korea) Young Bok Kil	def.	(South Korea) Won Gi Kim	Decision (3-0)	2	5:00	(Note: Road FC Featherweight tournament quarter-finals)
Featherweight	(South Korea) Mu Gyeom Choi	def.	(Netherlands) Hubert Geven	Decision (3-0)	2	5:00	(Note: Road FC Featherweight tournament quarter-finals)
Bantamweight	(South Korea) Byung Ok Cho	def.	(South Korea) Chang Hyun Song	Decision (3-0)	2	5:00	(Note: Road FC Bantamweight tournament quarter-finals)
Bantamweight	(South Korea) Yi Moon Han	def.	(South Korea) Sung Jae Kim	Decision (2-1)	3	5:00

==== Tournament Pair Assignment for selecting the second Champion in Road FC Bantamweight Division ====
Quarter-finals; Road FC 012 (2013-06-22)
(South Korea) Je Hoon Moon	DEC
(Japan) Shoko Sato	2-1
(South Korea) Kil Woo Lee	DEC
(South Korea) Jung Gi Hong	3-0
(South Korea) Min Jong Song	DEC
(Japan) Alan Yoshihiro	3-0
(South Korea) Yoon Jun Lee	TKO
(South Korea) Ho Jun Kim	1R

Semi-finals; Road FC 013 (2013-10-12)
(South Korea) Je Hoon Moon	KO
(Japan) Kil Woo Lee	1R
(South Korea) Min Jong Song	SUB
(South Korea) Yoon Jun Lee	1R

Final; Road FC 014 (2014-02-09)
(South Korea) Kil Woo Lee	DEC
(South Korea) Min Jong Song	2-1

== Road FC 011 ==
Road FC 011

Information
- Promotion: Road Fighting Championship
- Date: April 13, 2013
- Venue: Olympic Hall, Olympic Park
- City: (South Korea) Seoul

Event chronology
Road FC 010	Road FC 011	Road FC 012

Road FC 011 was an MMA event held by the Road FC on April 13, 2013 at the OlympicHall, OlympicPark in Seoul, South Korea.

=== Results ===
Main card
Weight class				Method	Round	Time	Notes
Lightweight	(South Korea) Yui Chul Nam	def.	(Japan) Takasuke Kume	Decision (3-0)	4	5:00	(Note: For the inaugural Road FC Lightweight Championship)
Featherweight	(Norway) Joachim Hansen	def.	(South Korea) Doo Won Seo	Submission (arm-triangle choke)	2	3:18
Light heavyweight	(Cameroon) Sokoudjou	def.	(South Korea) Seung Bae Wi	Decision (3-0)	3	5:00
Middleweight	(South Korea) Hye Seok Son	def.	(Japan) Minowaman	TKO (punches)	3	0:55
Welterweight	(South Korea) Jung Hwan Cha	def.	(Brazil) Luis Ramos	Decision (3-0)	3	5:00
Lightweight	(Turkey) Murat Kazgan	def.	(South Korea) Hyung Seok Lee	Submission (guillotine choke)	1	0:55
Young Guns 007
Weight class				Method	Round	Time	Notes
Bantamweight	(South Korea) Min Jong Song	def.	(South Korea) Yoon Jun Lee	Submission (guillotine choke)	1	3:03	(Note: Road FC Bantamweight tournament semi-finals)
Bantamweight	(South Korea) Kil Woo Lee	def.	(South Korea) Je Hoon Moon	KO (punch)	1	2:32	(Note: Road FC Bantamweight tournament semi-finals)
Bantamweight	(South Korea) Yoon Jun Lee	def.	(South Korea) Ho Joon Kim	TKO (punches)	1	0:50	(Note: Road FC Bantamweight tournament quarter-finals)
Bantamweight	(South Korea) Min Jong Song	def.	(Japan) Alan Yoshihiro Yamaniha	Decision (3-0)	2	5:00	(Note: Road FC Bantamweight tournament quarter-finals)
Bantamweight	(South Korea) Kil Woo Lee	def.	(South Korea) Jung Gi Hong	Decision (3-0)	2	5:00	(Note: Road FC Bantamweight tournament quarter-finals)
Bantamweight	(South Korea) Je Hoon Moon	def.	(Japan) Shoko Sato	Decision (2-1)	2	5:00	(Note: Road FC Bantamweight tournament quarter-finals)
Bantamweight	(South Korea) Min Woo Kim	def.	(South Korea) Sung Jae Kim	Decision (3-0)	2	5:00	(Note: Reserve Fight for the Road FC Bantamweight Tournament)

==== Tournament Pair Assignment for selecting the first Champion in Road FC Lightweight Division ====
Quarter-finals
Road FC 009 (2012-09-15)

Semi-finals

Road FC 010 (2011-12-24)

Final
Road FC 011 (2013-04-13)

(South Korea) Yong Jae Lee
TKO

(South Korea) Won Ki Kim
3R

(South Korea) Chul Yoon_{1}
1R

(Japan) Takasuke Kume
SUB

(Japan) Takasuke Kume
SUB

(South Korea) Chang Hyun Kim
1R

(Japan) Takasuke Kume
3-0_{2}

(South Korea) Yui Chul Nam
DEC

(South Africa) Vuyisile Colossa
TKO

(South Korea) Seok Mo Kim
1R

(South Africa) Vuyisile Colossa
2-1

(South Korea) Yui Chul Nam
DEC

(South Korea) Yui Chul Nam
TKO

(Japan) Masahiro Toryu
1R

_{1. Participating as a substitute because of the injury of Yong Jae Lee}
^{2. Extended round}

== See also ==
- List of Road FC events
- List of Road FC champions
- List of current Road FC fighters
- List of current mixed martial arts champions
