= 2014 in Road FC =

Mixed martial arts events

Information
- Promotion: Road Fighting Championship
- First date: January 18, 2014
- Last date: December 14, 2014

Events
- Total events: 10

Fights
- Total fights: 108
- Title fights: 4

Chronology
2013 in Road FC	2014 in Road FC	2015 in Road FC

The year 2014 was the 5th year in the history of the Road Fighting Championship, an MMA promotion based in South Korea. 2014 started with Road FC Korea 001 and ended with Road FC 020.

== List of events ==
#	Event title	Main event	Date	Arena	Location
10	Road FC 020	Lee vs. Lee	December 14, 2014	Olympic Hall, Olympic Park	(South Korea) Seoul
9	Road FC 019	Fukuda vs. Lee	November 9, 2014	Olympic Hall, Olympic Park	(South Korea) Seoul
8	Road FC 018	Kim vs. Ramos	August 30, 2014	Convention Centre, Grand Hilton Seoul	(South Korea) Seoul
7	Road FC 017	Kwon vs. Kume	August 17, 2014	Olympic Hall, Olympic Park	(South Korea) Seoul
6	Road FC 016	Jo vs. Song	July 26, 2014	Gumi Indoor Gymnasium	(South Korea) Gumi, Gyeongbuk
5	Road FC 015	Seo vs. Hansen	May 31, 2014	Wonju Chiak Gymnasium	(South Korea) Wonju, Gangwon
4	Road FC Korea 003: Korea vs. Brazil	Kwon vs. Diniz	April 6, 2014	The-K Hotel Seoul	(South Korea) Seoul
3	Road FC Korea 002: Korea vs. Japan	Lee vs. Terashima	March 9, 2014	Convention Centre, Grand Hilton Seoul	(South Korea) Seoul
2	Road FC 014	Choi vs. Kwon	February 9, 2014	Olympic Hall, Olympic Park	(South Korea) Seoul
1	Road FC Korea 001	Fukuda vs. Kim	January 18, 2014	Convention Centre, Grand Hilton Seoul	(South Korea) Seoul

== Road FC 020 ==
Road FC 020

Information
- Promotion: Road Fighting Championship
- Date: December 14, 2014
- Venue: Olympic Hall, Olympic Park
- City: (South Korea) Seoul

Event chronology
Road FC 019	Road FC 020	Road FC 021

Road FC 020 was an MMA event held by Road FC on December 14, 2014, at the Olympic Hall, Olympic Park in Seoul, South Korea.

=== Results ===
Main card
Weight class				Method	Round	Time	Notes
Bantamweight	(South Korea) Yoon Jun Lee	def.	(South Korea) Kil Woo Lee (c)	TKO (head kick & punches)	1	3:40	(Note: For the Road FC Bantamweight Championship)
Woman's Atomweight	(Japan) Satomi Takano	def.	(South Korea) Ga Yeon Song	Submission(inverted triangle kimura)	1	4:21
Bantamweight	(South Korea) Je Hoon Moon	def.	(South Korea) Min Woo Kim	Decision (2-0)	3	5:00
Bantamweight	(South Korea) Hyung Geun Park	def.	(South Korea) Yi Moon Han	KO (punch)	2	0:43
-80 kg Catchweight	(South Korea) Dae Hwan Kim	def.	(Brazil) Douglas Kobayashi	KO (punch)	1	1:58
Young Guns 019
Weight class				Method	Round	Time	Notes
Flyweight	(South Korea) Min Woo Kim	def.	(Japan) Mikihito Yamagami	Decision (3-0)	2	5:00
Featherweight	(South Korea) Young Seung Cho	def.	(South Korea) Ji Hyung Kim	KO (punch)	1	1:41
Lightweight	(South Korea) Yi Sak Kim (A)	def.	(South Korea) Choong Il Park	TKO (punches)	1	3:31
Bantamweight	(South Korea) Jun Hoe Jung	def.	(South Korea) Jin Seok Jung	Decision (3-0)	2	5:00
Bantamweight	(South Korea) Mu Song Choi	def.	(South Korea) Dae Myung Kim	Decision (3-0)	2	5:00
Lightweight	(Mongolia) Nandin-Erdene	def.	(South Korea) Jun Young Ahn	TKO (knees)	1	3:01
Featherweight	(South Korea) Sang Hyun Lee	def.	(South Korea) Won Bin Ki	TKO (punches)	2	4:14

== Road FC 019 ==
Road FC 019

Information
- Promotion: Road Fighting Championship
- Date: November 9, 2014
- Venue: Olympic Hall, Olympic Park
- City: (South Korea) Seoul

Event chronology
Road FC 018	Road FC 019	Road FC 020

Road FC 019 was an MMA event held by Road FC on November 9, 2014, at the Olympic Hall, Olympic Park in Seoul, South Korea.

=== Results ===
Main card
Weight class				Method	Round	Time	Notes
Middleweight	(Japan) Riki Fukuda	vs.	(South Korea) Dool Hee Lee	NC (Accidental Knee to Groin)	2	1:29
Middleweight	(South Korea) Dong Sik Yoon	def.	(Brazil) Amilcar Alves	Submission (3-0)	3	5:00
Welterweight	(South Korea) Jung Hwan Cha	def.	(Brazil) Alexandre Barros	Submission (3-0)	3	5:00
Woman's Strawweight	(Japan) Emi Tomimatsu	def.	(South Korea) Hyo Kyung Song	Submission (2-1)	2	5:00
Lightweight	(South Korea) Kwang Hee Lee	def.	(South Korea) Gi Bum Moon	TKO (punches)	2	3:15
Middleweight	(South Korea) Uh Jin Jeon	def.	(South Korea) Dae Sung Kim	Submission (rear naked choke)	2	4:32
Heavyweight	(South Korea) Gun Oh Shim	def.	(United States) Frederick Sloan	Submission (key lock)	2	0:15
Young Guns 018
Weight class				Method	Round	Time	Notes
Featherweight	(South Korea) Young Gi Hong	def.	(South Korea) Seung Min Baek	TKO (punches)	1	2:34
Featherweight	(United States) Tyrone Henderson	def.	(South Korea) Jin Soo Yoon	Submission (guillotine choke)	2	5:00
Featherweight	(South Korea) Tae Yoon Ha	def.	(South Korea) Yoon Heo	Decision (2-1)	2	5:00
Featherweight	(South Korea) Sang Jun Seok	def.	(Japan) Takashi Matsuoka	Submission (armbar)	1	2:15
Welterweight	(South Korea) Jae Sung Oh	def.	(United Kingdom) Stuart Gooch	Decision (3-0)	2	5:00
Flyweight	(South Korea) Woo Jae Kim	def.	(South Korea) Kwang Seok Jung	Decision (3-0)	1	0:24
Featherweight	(South Korea) Joong Kyung Lee	def.	(South Korea) Jun Young Park	Submission (rear naked choke)	1	0:24

== Road FC 018 ==
Road FC 018

Information
- Promotion: Road Fighting Championship
- Date: August 30, 2014
- Venue: Convention Centre, Grand Hilton Seoul
- City: (South Korea) Seoul

Event chronology
Road FC 017	Road FC 018	Road FC 019

Road FC 018 was an MMA event held by Road FC on August 30, 2014, at the Convention Hall, Convention Centre, Grand Hilton Seoul in Seoul, South Korea.

=== Results ===
Main card
Weight class				Method	Round	Time	Notes
Welterweight	(South Korea) Hoon Kim	vs.	(Brazil) Luis Ramos	Draw (0-1, 28-29/28-28/27-27)	3	5:00
Woman's Atomweight	(South Korea) Seo Hee Ham	def.	(Ukraine) Alyona Rassohyna	Decision (3-0)	2	5:00
Bantamweight	(South Korea) Je Hoon Moon	def.	(Brazil) Marcos Vina	TKO (body kick & punches)	1	2:30
Woman's -67 kg Catchweight	(South Korea) Ji Yeon Kim	def.	(Japan) Yukimi Kamikaze	Submission (rear naked choke)	1	1:19
Featherweight	(Japan) Nobuhito Irei	def.	(South Korea) Duk Young Jang	Decision (2-1)	2	5:00
Lightweight	(South Korea) Chang Hyun Kim	def.	(South Korea) Seok Mo Kim	Submission (triangle armbar)	1	1:48
Young Guns 017
Weight class				Method	Round	Time	Notes
-72 kg Catchweight	(South Korea) Won Gi Kim	def.	(South Korea) Jun Young Ahn	Decision (3-0)	2	5:00
-67 kg Catchweight	(South Korea) Byung Ok Cho	def.	(South Korea) Young Jun Cho	Decision (3-0)	2	5:00
Welterweight	(South Korea) Gyu Seok Son	def.	(South Korea) Jung Min Bae	TKO (punches)	1	1:00
Lightweight	(South Korea) Sung Jun Yoon	def.	(South Korea) Jin Ho Son	Submission (armbar)	1	4:16
Bantamweight	(South Korea) Yong Geun Kim	def.	(South Korea) Jong Han Kang	Submission (armbar)	1	0:52
Lightweight	(South Korea) Chan Sol Park	def.	(South Korea) Myung Gu Yeo	Decision (3-0)	2	5:00

== Road FC 017 ==
Road FC 017

Information
- Promotion: Road Fighting Championship
- Date: January 18, 2014
- Venue: Olympic Hall, Olympic Park
- City: (South Korea) Seoul

Event chronology
Road FC 016	Road FC 017	Road FC 018

Road FC 017 was an MMA event held by Road FC on August 17, 2014, at the Olympic Hall, Olympic Park in Seoul, South Korea.

=== Results ===
Main card
Weight class				Method	Round	Time	Notes
Woman's -47.5 kg Catchweight	(South Korea) Ga Yeon Song	def.	(Japan) Emi Yamamoto	TKO (punches)	1	2:23	(Note: Road FC Special Woman's -47.5 kg Catchweight Division Match)
Lightweight	(South Korea) A Sol Kwon	def.	(Japan) Takasuke Kume	Decision (2-1)	3	5:00	(Note: For the vacant Road FC Lightweight Championship)
-62 kg Catchweight	(South Korea) Yoon Jun Lee	def.	(Brazil) Thiago Silva	TKO (body kick & punches)	1	1:38
-88 kg Catchweight	(South Korea) Jung Kyo Park	def.	(South Korea) Dae Sung Kim	TKO (punches)	3	3:10
Light Heavyweight	(South Korea) Nae Chul Kim	def.	(South Korea) Yang Rae Yoo	Decision (3-0)	3	5:00
Young Guns 016
Weight class				Method	Round	Time	Notes
Bantamweight	(South Korea) Jong Hoon Kim	def.	(South Korea) Jung Gi Hong	Decision (2-1)	2	5:00
Flyweight	(South Korea) Jong Hyun Kwak	def.	(South Korea) Tae Kyun Kim	Decision (3-0)	2	5:00
Bantamweight	(South Korea) Sung Jin Hong	def.	(South Korea) Jung Min Park	Submission (rear naked choke)	1	3:02
Featherweight	(South Korea) Mu Song Choi	def.	(South Korea) Jin Soo Seo	Decision (3-0)	2	5:00

== Road FC 016 ==
Road FC 016

Information
- Promotion: Road Fighting Championship
- Date: July 26, 2014
- Venue: Gumi Indoor Gymnasium
- City: (South Korea) Gumi, Gyeongbuk

Event chronology
Road FC 015	Road FC 016	Road FC 017

Road FC 016 was an MMA event held by Road FC on July 26, 2014, at the Gumi Indoor Gymnasium in Gumi, Gyeongbuk, South Korea.

=== Results ===
Main card
Weight class				Method	Round	Time	Notes
Flyweight	(South Korea) Nam Jin Jo	def.	(South Korea) Min Jong Song	Decision (2-1)	3	5:00	(Note: For the Road FC Flyweight Championship)
Middleweight	(Japan) Riki Fukuda	def.	(South Korea) Dong Sik Yoon	TKO (punches)	1	3:36
Lightweight	(Brazil) Bruno Miranda	def.	(South Korea) Kwang Hee Lee	KO (knee)	1	4:29
Woman's -54 kg Catchweight	(South Korea) Hyo Kyung Song	def.	(Japan) Hazuki Kimura	TKO (punches)	2	2:10
Featherweight	(South Korea) Hyung Geun Park	def.	(South Korea) Byung Hee Lim	Decision (3-0)	2	5:00
Young Gun 015
Weight class				Method	Round	Time	Notes
-92 kg Catchweight	(Japan) Daiju Takase	def.	(South Korea) Seung Bae Wi	TKO (punches)	1	4:34
Lightweight	(South Korea) Young Jun Cho	def.	(South Korea) Chan Hyun Jeon	Decision (3-0)	2	5:00
Lightweight	(South Korea) Tae Woo Yoo	def.	(South Korea) Kyung Kwan Ryu	Submission (rear naked choke)	1	2:53
Flyweight	(South Korea) Kyu Hwa Kim	def.	(South Korea) Jin Min Kim	Decision (3-0)	2	5:00
Middleweight	(South Korea) Dae Sung Kim	def.	(South Korea) Bo Kyung Seol	Decision (3-0)	2	5:00

== Road FC 015 ==
Road FC 015

Information
- Promotion: Road Fighting Championship
- Date: May 31, 2014
- Venue: Wonju Chiak Gymnasium
- City: (South Korea) Wonju, Gangwon

Event chronology
Road FC Korea 003: Korea vs. Brazil	Road FC 015	Road FC 016

Road FC 015 was an MMA event held by Road FC on May 31, 2014, at the Wonju Chiak Gymnasium in Wonju, Gangwon, South Korea.

=== Results ===
Main card
Weight class				Method	Round	Time	Notes
Featherweight	(South Korea) Doo Won Seo	def.	(Norway) Joachim Hansen	KO (punch)	1	0:15
Middleweight	(South Korea) Jung Kyo Park	def.	(Japan) Minowaman	KO (punch)	1	4:42
Bantamweight	(South Korea) Soo Chul Kim	def.	(Japan) Issei Tamura	Submission (rear naked choke)	1	2:41
Featherweight	(South Korea) Young Bok Kil	def.	(Japan) Kosuke Umeda	KO (punch)	1	4:19
Heavyweight	(South Korea) Hyun Woo Park	def.	(South Korea) Jae Hoon Kim	TKO (punches)	1	2:44
Young Guns 014
Weight class				Method	Round	Time	Notes
Bantamweight	(South Korea) Young Seung Cho	def.	(South Korea) Ho Jun Kim	Decision (2-1)	2	5:00
Flyweight	(South Korea) Seok Yong Kim	def.	(South Korea) Jong Hyun Kwak	TKO (punches)	2	2:19
Middleweight	(South Korea) Dae Sung Kim	def.	(South Korea) Chan Ho Lee	KO (punch)	1	3:03
Featherweight	(South Korea) Ho Taek Oh	vs.	(United States) Tyrone Henderson	Draw (1-0 or 0-1)	2	5:00
Bantamweight	(South Korea) Sung Mok Kang	def.	(South Korea) Jae Hak Yoo	TKO (punches)	2	2:18

== Road FC Korea 003: Korea vs. Brazil ==
Road FC Korea 003: Korea vs. Brazil

Information
- Promotion: Road Fighting Championship
- Date: April 6, 2014
- Venue: The-K Hotel Seoul
- City: (South Korea) Seoul

Event chronology
Road FC Korea 002: Korea vs. Japan	Road FC Korea 003: Korea vs. Brazil	Road FC 015

Road FC Korea 003: Korea vs. Brazil was an MMA event held by Road FC on April 6, 2014, at the K Hotel Seoul in Seoul, South Korea.

=== Results ===
Main card
Weight class				Method	Round	Time	Notes
Lightweight	(South Korea) A Sol Kwon	def.	(Brazil) Giovani Diniz	Technical Submission (rear naked choke)	3	2:47
Bantamweight	(Brazil) Thiago Silva	def.	(South Korea) Je Hoon Moon	Submission (arm triangle choke)	3	1:03
Lightweight	(Brazil) Bruno Miranda	def.	(South Korea) Won Gi Kim	TKO (punches)	2	1:20
Woman's Atomweight	(South Korea) Seo Hee Ham	def.	(United States) Shino VanHoose	Decision (3-0)	2	5:00
Bantamweight	(Japan) Ryohei Tsujikawa	def.	(South Korea) Yong Seok Ko	Submission (armbar)	1	4:43
Young Guns 013
Weight class				Method	Round	Time	Notes
Featherweight	(South Korea) Hyung Seok Lee	def.	(South Korea) Byung Ok Cho	Submission (rear naked choke)	1	4:58
Lightweight	(South Korea) Dae Sung Park	def.	(South Korea) Tae Woo Yoo	TKO (punches)	1	4:24
Bantamweight	(South Korea) Jong Hoon Kim	def.	(South Korea) Sung Soo Lee	Submission (armbar)	1	3:38
Welterweight	(South Korea) Gyu Seok Son	def.	(South Korea) Sung Jun Yoon	Submission (rear naked choke)	1	2:57
Flyweight	(South Korea) Kyu Hwa Kim	def.	(South Korea) Jae Kyung Kim	Decision (3-0)	2	5:00

== Road FC Korea 002: Korea vs. Japan ==
Road FC Korea 002: Korea vs. Japan

Information
- Promotion: Road Fighting Championship
- Date: March 9, 2014
- Venue: Convention Centre, Grand Hilton Seoul
- City: (South Korea) Seoul

Event chronology
Road FC 013	Road FC Korea 002: Korea vs. Japan	Road FC Korea 003: Korea vs. Brazil

Road FC Korea 001 was an MMA event held by Road FC on March 9, 2014, at the Convention Hall, Convention Centre, Grand Hilton Seoul in Seoul, South Korea.

=== Results ===
Main card
Weight class				Method	Round	Time	Notes
Bantamweight	(South Korea) Yoon Jun Lee	def.	(Japan) Kosuke Terashima	Decision (3-0)	3	5:00
Lightweight	(South Korea) Hyung Seok Lee	def.	(United Kingdom) Ben Buchan	Submission (rear naked choke)	2	4:27
Bantamweight	(South Korea) Yi Moon Han	def.	(Japan) Ryo Takagi	Submission (rear naked choke)	3	4:41
Woman's Bantamweight	(South Korea) Ji Yeon Kim	vs.	(Japan) Takayo Hashi	Draw (0-0)	2	5:00
Featherweight	(South Korea) Min Woo Kim	def.	(South Korea) Chang Hyun Song	Submission (rear naked choke)	2	1:35
Young Guns 012
Weight class				Method	Round	Time	Notes
Featherweight	(South Korea) Gi Bum Moon	def.	(South Korea) Hyung Ryul Kim	TKO (punches)	1	4:30
Welterweight	(South Korea) Je Il Jung	def.	(South Korea) Jae Sung Oh	Decision (3-0)	2	5:00
Flyweight	(South Korea) Jong Hyun Kwak	def.	(South Korea) Woo Jae Kim	Decision (3-0)	2	5:00
Flyweight	(South Korea) Seok Yong Kim	def.	(South Korea) Jin Min Kim	Submission (rear naked choke)	1	4:51

== Road FC 014 ==
Road FC 014

Information
- Promotion: Road Fighting Championship
- Date: February 9, 2014
- Venue: Olympic Hall, Olympic Park
- City: (South Korea) Seoul

Event chronology
Road FC 014	Road FC 014	Road FC Korea 002: Korea vs. Japan

Road FC 014 was an MMA event held by Road FC on February 9, 2014, at the Olympic Hall, Olympic Park in Seoul, South Korea.

=== Results ===
Main card
Weight class				Method	Round	Time	Notes
Lightweight	(South Korea) Hyung Bin Yoon	def.	(Japan) Takaya Tsukuda	TKO (punches)	1	4:18	(Note: Road FC Special Lightweight Division Match)
Featherweight	(South Korea) Mu Gyeom Choi	def.	(South Korea) Bae Yong Kwon	Decision (2-1)	4	5:00	(Note: For the inaugural Road FC Featherweight Championship)
Lightweight	(Japan) Takasuke Kume	def.	(Brazil) Eduardo Simoes	Decision (3-0)	3	5:00
Bantamweight	(South Korea) Soo Chul Kim	def.	(Japan) Motonobu Tezuka	TKO (punches)	1	1:58
Flyweight	(South Korea) Nam Jin Jo	def.	(Japan) Mikihito Yamagami	Decision (3-0)	3	5:00
Light Heavyweight	(South Korea) Nae Chul Kim	def.	(Japan) Ryuta Noji	TKO (punches)	2	4:28
Young Guns 011
Weight class				Method	Round	Time	Notes
Featherweight	(South Korea) Hyung Seok Lee	def.	(South Korea) Yi Sak Kim (A)	Decision (3-0)	2	5:00
Bantamweight	(South Korea) Ho Jun Kim	def.	(South Korea) Dae Myung Kim	TKO (punches)	2	4:57
Featherweight	(South Korea) Jung Young Lee	def.	(South Korea) Se Yoon Kwon	Submission (armbar)	2	3:21
Bantamweight	(South Korea) Young Seung Cho	def.	(South Korea) Tae Ho Jin	Decision (3-0)	2	5:00
-75 kg Catchweight	(South Korea) Ye Won Nam	def.	(Mongolia) Nandin-Erdene	Submission (rear naked choke)	1	4:24

==== Tournament Pair Assignment for selecting the first Champion in Road FC Featherweight Division ====
Quarter-finals; Road FC 012 (2013-06-22)
(South Korea) Mu Gyeom Choi	DEC
(Netherlands) Hubert Geven	3-0
(South Korea) Young Bok Kil	DEC
(South Korea) Won Gi Kim	3-0
(Japan) Kosuke Umeda	BYE
(South Korea) Chang Hyun Kim	misses weight
(South Korea) Bae Yong Kwon	DEC
(Japan) Michihiro Omigawa	2-1

Semi-finals; Road FC 013 (2013-10-12)
(South Korea) Mu Gyeom Choi	BYE
(Japan) Young Bok Kil	misses weight
(Japan) Kosuke Umeda	1R
(South Korea) Bae Yong Kwon	TKO

Final; Road FC 014 (2014-02-09)
(Japan) Mu Gyeom Choi	DEC
(South Korea) Bae Yong Kwon	2-1_{1}

_{1. Extended Round}

== Road FC Korea 001 ==
Road FC Korea 001

Information
- Promotion: Road Fighting Championship
- Date: January 18, 2014
- Venue: Convention Centre, Grand Hilton Seoul
- City: (South Korea) Seoul

Event chronology
Road FC 013	Road FC Korea 001	Road FC 014

Road FC Korea 001 was an MMA event held by Road FC on January 18, 2014, at the Convention Centre, Grand Hilton Seoul in Seoul, South Korea.

=== Results ===
Main card
Weight class				Method	Round	Time	Notes
Middleweight	(Japan) Riki Fukuda	def.	(South Korea) Hee Seung Kim	TKO (punches)	2	2:09
Lightweight	(South Korea) A Sol Kwon	def.	(Iran) Mostafa Abdollahi	Submission (rear naked choke)	1	3:31
Featherweight	(South Korea) Yoon Jun Lee	def.	(South Korea) Won Ki Kim	TKO (knee strike & punches)	1	0:57
Lightweight	(South Korea) Doo Je Jung	def.	(South Korea) Yong Jae Lee	TKO (punches)	1	3:12
Middleweight	(South Korea) Sang Il Ahn	def.	(South Korea) Uh Jin Jeon	TKO (knee strikes)	3	1:35
Young Guns 010
Weight class				Method	Round	Time	Notes
Bantamweight	(South Korea) Min Woo Kim	def.	(South Korea) Dong Jin Lee	KO (head kick)	1	2:34
Bantamweight	(South Korea) Gwang Soo Park	def.	(South Korea) Kyu Hwa Kim	Decision (3-0)	2	5:00
Featherweight	(South Korea) Dae Sung Park	def.	(South Korea) Ho Taek Oh	Decision (3-0)	2	5:00
Flyweight	(South Korea) Hyo Ryong Kim	def.	(South Korea) In Haeng Cho	TKO (elbow & punches)	1	2:15
Lightweight	(South Korea) Kyung Gwan Ryu	def.	(South Korea) Myung Gu Yeo	Decision (3-0)	2	5:00
Welterweight	(Mongolia) Nandin-Erdene	def.	(South Korea) Byung Hyun Lee	TKO (punches)	1	0:24

== See also ==
- List of Road FC events
- List of Road FC champions
- List of current Road FC fighters
- List of current mixed martial arts champions
