= 2010 in Road FC =

Mixed martial arts events

Information
- Promotion: Road Fighting Championship
- First date: October 23, 2010
- Last date: October 23, 2010

Events
- Total events: 1

Fights
- Total fights: 10

Chronology
2010 in Road FC	2011 in Road FC

The year 2010 was the 1st year in the history of the Road FC, an MMA promotion based in South Korea. 2010 started with Road FC 001: The Resurrection of Champions.

== List of events ==
#	Event Title	Main event	Date	Arena	Location
1	Road FC 001: The Resurrection of Champions	Nam vs. Okazawa	October 23, 2010	Event Hall, Seoul Fashion Center	(South Korea) Seoul

== Road FC 001: The Resurrection of Champions ==
Road FC 001: The Resurrection of Champions

Information
- Promotion: Road Fighting Championship
- Date: October 23, 2010
- Venue: Event Hall, Seoul Fashion Center
- City: (South Korea) Seoul

Event chronology
Road FC 001: The Resurrection of Champions	Road FC 002: Alive

Road FC 001: The Resurrection of Championsun was an MMA event held by the Road FC on October 23, 2010, at the Seoul Fashion Center Event Hall in Seoul, South Korea.

=== Results ===
Main card
Weight class				Method	Round	Time	Notes
Lightweight	(South Korea) Yui Chul Nam	def.	(Japan) Kota Okazawa	TKO (punches)	1	4:00
Featherweight	(South Korea) Doo Won Seo	def.	(Japan) Akihito Hara	TKO (punches)	1	2:07
Lightweight	(Japan) Daisuke Hanazawa	def.	(South Korea) Tae Hyun Bang	Submission (rear naked choke)	1	2:54
Featherweight	(South Korea) Jong Woo Park	def.	(South Korea) Seung Yoon Lee	TKO (doctor stop)	2	4:12
Middleweight	(South Korea) Seung Bae Wi	def.	(Japan) Shuji Morikawa	TKO (punches)	1	2:20
Lightweight	(South Korea) Duk Young Jang	def.	(Japan) Yuki Yamasawa	Submission (armbar)	2	1:37
Lightweight	(South Korea) Woo Sung Yoo	def.	(Japan) Keigo Hirayama	Submission (guillotine choke)	1	1:56
Featherweight	(South Korea) Young Bok Kil	def.	(United States) Jaral Bowman	Submission (arm triangle choke)	2	4:06
Bantamweight	(South Korea) Soo Chul Kim	def.	(South Korea) Hyo Ryong Kim	Submission (guillotine choke)	1	1:50
Lightweight	(South Korea) Sang Il Lee	def.	(South Korea) Je Hoon Yoo	Decision (3-0)	3	5:00

== See also ==
- List of Road FC events
- List of Road FC champions
- List of current Road FC fighters
- List of current mixed martial arts champions
