= 2011 in Road FC =

Mixed martial arts events

Information
- Promotion: Road Fighting Championship
- First date: April 16, 2011
- Last date: December 3, 2011

Events
- Total events: 4

Fights
- Total fights: 42

Chronology
| 2010 in Road FC | 2011 in Road FC | 2012 in Road FC |

The year 2011 was the 2nd year in the history of the Road Fighting Championship, an MMA promotion based in South Korea. 2011 started with Road FC 002: Alive and ended with Road FC 005: Night of Champions.

== List of events ==
| # | Event Title | Main Event | Date | Arena | Location |
|---|---|---|---|---|---|
| 4 | Road FC 005: Night of Champions | Oyama vs. Kang | December 3, 2011 | Jangchung Gymnasium | (South Korea) Seoul |
| 3 | Road FC 004: Young Guns | Lee vs. Kim | October 3, 2011 | Convention Centre, Grand Hilton Seoul | (South Korea) Seoul |
| 2 | Road FC 003: Explosion | Wi vs. Kang | July 24, 2011 | Convention Centre, Grand Hilton Seoul | (South Korea) Seoul |
| 1 | Road FC 002: Alive | Kang vs. Lee | April 16, 2011 | Jangchung Gymnasium | (South Korea) Seoul |

== Road FC 005: Night of Champions ==
Road FC 005: Night of Champions

Information
- Promotion: Road Fighting Championship
- Date: April 16, 2011
- Venue: Jangchung Gymnasium
- City: (South Korea) Seoul

Event chronology
| Road FC 004: Young Guns | Road FC 005: Night of Champions | Road FC 006: Final 4 |

ROAD FC 005: Night of Champions was an MMA event held by the Road FC on December 3, 2011, at the Jangchung Gymnasium in Seoul, South Korea.

=== Results ===
Main card
| Weight class | | | | Method | Round | Time | Notes |
|---|---|---|---|---|---|---|---|
| Middleweight | (Japan) Shungo Oyama | def. | (Canada) Denis Kang | TKO (knees) | 1 | 4:30 | (Note: Road FC Middleweight tournament quarter-finals) |
| Lightweight | (South Korea) Yui Chul Nam | def. | (South Africa) Vuyisile Colossa | Decision (3-0) | 1 | 2:54 |
| Bantamweight | (South Korea) Kyung Ho Kang | def. | (South Korea) Min Jong Song | Submission (armbar) | 1 | 4:24 |
| Featherweight | (South Korea) Bae Yong Kwon | def. | (South Korea) Brian Choi | Decision (3-0) | 3 | 5:00 |
| Lightweight | (South Korea) Jae Sun Lee | def. | (Japan) Akihiko Mori | Decision (3-0) | 3 | 5:00 |
| Middleweight | (South Korea) Jong Dae Kim | def. | (South Korea) Dool Hee Lee | TKO (punches) | 1 | 0:18 | (Note: Road FC Middleweight tournament quarter-finals) |
Young Guns 001
| Weight class | | | | Method | Round | Time | Notes |
| -82 kg Catchweight | (South Korea) In Ho Cha | def. | (South Korea) Chul Yoon | TKO (punches) | 2 | 3:10 |
| Bantamweight | (South Korea) Jae Hyun So | def. | (South Korea) Kyung Ho Park | Submission (rear naked choke) | 1 | 3:38 |
| -68 kg Catchweight | (South Korea) Young Sam Jung | def. | (South Korea) Dean Maraj | Submission (armbar) | 1 | 0:39 |
| Bantamweight | (South Korea) Gwang Soo Park | def. | (South Korea) Jae Ho Lee | TKO (punches) | 1 | 1:04 |
| Middleweight | (South Korea) Hee Seung Kim | def. | (United States) Andrew Dugger | TKO (punches) | 1 | 4:50 |
| Bantamweight | (South Korea) Min Woo Kim | def. | (South Korea) Ho Jun Kim | Decision (3-0) | 2 | 5:00 |

== Road FC 004: Young Guns ==
Road FC 004: Young Guns

Information
- Promotion: Road Fighting Championship
- Date: October 3, 2011
- Venue: Convention Centre, Grand Hilton Seoul
- City: (South Korea) Seoul

Event chronology
| Road FC 003: Explosion | Road FC 004: Young Guns | Road FC 005: Night of Champions |

ROAD FC 004: Young Guns was an MMA event held by the Road FC on October 3, 2011, at the Grand Hilton Seoul Convention Centre in Seoul, South Korea.

=== Results ===
Main card
| Weight class | | | | Method | Round | Time | Notes |
|---|---|---|---|---|---|---|---|
| Middleweight | (South Korea) Eun Soo Lee | def. | (South Korea) Jae Young Kim | Decision (3-0) | 3 | 5:00 | (Note: Road FC Middleweight tournament quarter-finals) |
| -68 kg Catchweight | (South Korea) Doo Won Seo | def. | (Japan) Yasuhiro Motomura | TKO (punches) | 1 | 2:54 |
| Lightweight | (South Korea) Yui Chul Nam | def. | (Japan) Tomoyoshi Iwamiya | Decision (3-0) | 3 | 5:00 |
| Middleweight | (South Korea) Hye Seok Son | def. | (South Korea) Jung Kyo Park | TKO (punches) | 1 | 0:29 | (Note: Road FC Middleweight tournament quarter-finals) |
| Middleweight | (South Korea) Jong Dae Kim | def. | (South Korea) In Ho Cha | Decision (3-0) | 3 | 5:00 |
Preliminary Card
| Weight class | | | | Method | Round | Time | Notes |
| -67 kg Catchweight | (South Korea) Tae Ho Jin | def. | (South Korea) Young Sam Jung | Submission (rear naked choke) | 1 | 3:10 |
| Lightweight | (South Korea) Gyo Pyung Hwang | def. | (South Korea) Dae Gun Kim | Decision (3-0) | 2 | 5:00 |
| Bantamweight | (South Korea) Kyung Ho Park | def. | (South Korea) Jae Ho Lee | TKO (punches) | 2 | 1:18 |
| Lightweight | (South Korea) Hyung Seok Lee | def. | (South Korea) Jun Young Ahn | Submission (armbar) | 3 | 3:03 |

== Road FC 003: Explosion ==
Road FC 002: Alive

Information
- Promotion: Road Fighting Championship
- Date: July 24, 2011
- Venue: Grand Hilton Seoul Convention Centre
- City: (South Korea) Seoul

Event chronology
| Road FC 002: Alive | Road FC 002: Alive | Road FC 004: Young Guns |

ROAD FC 003: Explosion was an MMA event held by the Road FC on July 24, 2011, at the Grand Hilton Seoul Convention Centre in Seoul, South Korea.

=== Results ===
Main card
| Weight class | | | | Method | Round | Time | Notes |
|---|---|---|---|---|---|---|---|
| Light heavyweight | (South Korea) Seung Bae Wi | def. | (Canada) Denis Kang | TKO (Knees) | 2 | 3:18 |
| Bantamweight | (South Korea) Kyung Ho Kang | def. | (South Korea) Kil Woo Lee | TKO (corner stoppage) | 1 | 0:52 |
| Light heavyweight | (South Korea) Jae Young Kim | def. | (South Korea) Sang Soo Lee | KO (punch) | 3 | 2:15 |
| Bantamweight | (South Korea) Soo Chul Kim | def. | (Japan) Kenta Nakamura | Decision (3-0) | 3 | 5:00 |
| Middleweight | (South Korea) Han Geun Lee | def. | (South Korea) Jong Dae Kim | KO (punch) | 1 | 3:36 |
| Lightweight | (South Korea) Chang Hyun Kim | def. | (South Korea) Woo Sung Yoo | Submission (rear naked choke) | 3 | 2:40 |
| -80 kg Catchweight | (South Korea) Dong Hyun Kim (B) | def. | (South Korea) In Ho Cha | KO (punch) | 1 | 3:35 |
| Middleweight | (South Korea) Sang Il Ahn | def. | (South Korea) Jung Kyo Park | DQ (Ahn Kicked in Groin) | 2 | 1:17 |
| Bantamweight | (South Korea) Min Jong Song | def. | (South Korea) Jae Hyun So | TKO (punches) | 1 | 3:11 |
| heavyweight | (South Korea) Gyu Seok Son | def. | (South Korea) Won Ho Seo | TKO (doctor Stop) | 2 | 5:00 |

== Road FC 002: Alive ==
Road FC 002: Alive

Information
- Promotion: Road Fighting Championship
- Date: April 16, 2011
- Venue: Seoul Fashion Center
- City: (South Korea) Seoul

Event chronology
| Road FC 001: The Resurrection of Champions | Road FC 002: Alive | Road FC 003: Explosion |

ROAD FC 002: Alive was an MMA event held by the Road FC on April 16, 2011, at the Seoul Fashion Center in Seoul, South Korea.

=== Results ===
Main card
| Weight class | | | | Method | Round | Time | Notes |
|---|---|---|---|---|---|---|---|
| Light heavyweight | (Canada) Denis Kang | def. | (South Korea) Eun Soo Lee | Decision (3-0) | 3 | 5:00 |
| Featherweight | (South Korea) Doo Won Seo | def. | (Japan) Satoshi Nishino | TKO (doctor Stop) | 1 | 0:53 |
| Lightweight | (Japan) Koji Ando | def. | (South Korea) Woo Sung Yoo | Decision (3-0) | 3 | 5:00 |
| Featherweight | (South Korea) Bae Yong Kwon | def. | (South Korea) Kyung Ho Kang | Submission (triangle armbar) | 1 | 4:05 |
| Bantamweight | (South Korea) Soo Chul Kim | def. | (South Korea) Jae Hyun So | Decision (3-0) | 3 | 5:00 |
| Welterweight | (South Korea) Jung Hwan Cha | def. | (South Korea) Jung Kyo Park | Decision (3-0) | 3 | 5:00 |
| Bantamweight | (Japan) Shoko Sato | def. | (South Korea) Young Bok Kil | Decision (3-0) | 3 | 5:00 |
| Light heavyweight | (South Korea) Ji Hoon Kim | def. | (Japan) Junpei Hamada | Decision (3-0) | 3 | 5:00 |
| Lightweight | (South Korea) Seok Mo Kim | def. | (South Korea) Hwi Kyu Kim | Submission (kimura) | 1 | 2:36 |
| Bantamweight | (South Korea) Min Jong Song | def. | (South Korea) Je Hoon Moon | Decision (3-0) | 3 | 5:00 |

== See also ==
- List of Road FC events
- List of Road FC champions
- List of current Road FC fighters
- List of current mixed martial arts champions
