= Yui Chul Nam =

South Korean mixed martial artist (born 1981)

- Born: July 16, 1981 (age 45); Seoul, South Korea
- Native name: 남의철
- Other names: The Korean Bulldozer
- Nationality: South Korean
- Height: 5 ft 9 in (1.75 m)
- Weight: 155 lb (70 kg; 11 st 1 lb)
- Division: Lightweight (155 lb)
- Reach: 69.0 in (175 cm)
- Style: Taekwondo, Judo, BJJ
- Fighting out of: South Korea
- Team: Free
- Rank: Black belt in Taekwondo; Black belt in Judo; Black belt in Brazilian Jiu-Jitsu
- Years active: 2006 - present

Mixed martial arts record
- Total: 32
- Wins: 21
- By knockout: 10
- By submission: 1
- By decision: 10
- Losses: 10
- By knockout: 4
- By submission: 1
- By decision: 5
- Draws: 1

Other information
- Mixed martial arts record from Sherdog

- Korean name
- Hangul: 남의철
- Hanja: 南宜澈
- RR: Nam Uicheol
- MR: Nam Ŭich'ŏl

Yui Chul Nam (Korean: 남의철, born July 16, 1981, Korean name is Nam Yui-Chul) is a South Korean mixed martial artist. He formerly competed in the UFC's lightweight division after fighting in the Korean promotion Road FC.

== Mixed martial arts career ==
=== Background and early career ===
Nam began his professional mixed martial arts career in 2006, competing for many regional promotions (including M-1 Global, Legend Fighting Championship and ROAD FC) throughout Asia. Nam was able to compile a record of 17-4-1 before signing with the UFC in December 2013.

=== Ultimate Fighting Championship ===
Nam made his promotional debut against Kazuki Tokudome on March 1, 2014 at The Ultimate Fighter: China Finale. Nam won the bout via split decision. Their performance earned both participants Fight of the Night honors.

Nam faced returning UFC veteran Phillipe Nover in a featherweight bout on May 16, 2015 at UFC Fight Night 66. He lost the fight via split decision.

Nam faced Mike De La Torre on November 28, 2015 at UFC Fight Night 79. He lost the fight via split decision and was subsequently released from the promotion.

== Championships and accomplishments ==
=== Mixed martial arts ===
- Spirit Martial Challenge
  - Spirit MC welterweight(-155 lb) title (one time)
- ROAD Fighting Championship
  - ROAD FC lightweight title (one time)
  - ROAD FC lightweight tournament winner (2013)
- Ultimate Fighting Championship
  - Fight of the Night (One time)

== Mixed martial arts record ==
Professional record breakdown
32 matches	21 wins	10 losses
By knockout	10	4
By submission	1	1
By decision	10	5
Draws	1	

Res.	Record	Opponent	Method	Event	Date	Round	Time	Location	Notes
Loss	21–10–1	Ji Hyuk-min	KO (punches)	Black Combat 16	January 31, 2026	2	0:39	Incheon, South Korea	
Win	21–9–1	Shutaro Miyahira	TKO (punches)	Black Combat Rise 7	August 21, 2025	3	2:11	Osan, South Korea	Return to Featherweight.
Loss	20–9–1	Park Eoh-jin	KO (punches)	Black Combat 12	September 28, 2024	1	4:11	Seoul, South Korea	Lightweight bout.
Win	20–8–1	Shin Dong-guk	Decision (unanimous)	Road FC 057	December 14, 2019	3	5:00	Seoul, South Korea	Welterweight debut.
Win	19–8–1	Jung Doo-je	TKO (punches)	Road FC 043	October 28, 2017	1	2:49	Seoul, South Korea	
Loss	18–8–1	Tom Santos	KO (punches)	Road FC 040	July 15, 2017	1	0:07	Seoul, South Korea	2017 Road FC Lightweight Tournament Round of 16.
Loss	18–7–1	Tom Santos	TKO (punches)	Road FC 038	April 15, 2017	2	2:30	Seoul, South Korea	Return to Lightweight.
Loss	18–6–1	Mike De La Torre	Decision (split)	UFC Fight Night: Henderson vs. Masvidal	November 28, 2015	3	5:00	Seoul, South Korea	
Loss	18–5–1	Phillipe Nover	Decision (split)	UFC Fight Night: Edgar vs. Faber	May 16, 2015	3	5:00	Pasay, Philippines	Featherweight debut.
Win	18–4–1	Kazuki Tokudome	Decision (split)	The Ultimate Fighter China Finale: Kim vs. Hathaway	March 1, 2014	3	5:00	Macau, SAR, China	Fight of the Night.
Win	17–4–1	Takasuke Kume	Decision (unanimous)	Road FC 013	October 12, 2013	3	5:00	Gumi, South Korea	Defended the Road FC Lightweight Championship.
Win	16–4–1	Takasuke Kume	Decision (unanimous)	Road FC 011	April 13, 2013	4	5:00	Seoul, South Korea	Won the Road FC Lightweight Championship.
Win	15–4–1	Vuyisile Colossa	Decision (split)	Road FC 010	November 24, 2012	3	5:00	Busan, South Korea	2012 Road FC Lightweight Tournament Semifinal.
Win	14–4–1	Masahiro Toryu	KO (punches)	Road FC 009: Beatdown	September 15, 2012	1	1:32	Wonju, South Korea	2012 Road FC Lightweight Tournament Quarterfinal.
Loss	13–4–1	Jadamba Narantungalag	Submission (guillotine choke)	Legend FC 8	March 30, 2012	2	0:58	Hong Kong, SAR, China	For the Legend FC Lightweight Championship.
Win	13–3–1	Vuyisile Colossa	Decision (unanimous)	Road FC 005	December 3, 2011	3	5:00	Seoul, South Korea	
Win	12–3–1	Tomoyoshi Iwamiya	Decision (unanimous)	Road FC 004	October 3, 2011	3	5:00	Seoul, South Korea	
Win	11–3–1	Rob Hill	TKO (punches)	Legend FC 5	July 16, 2011	2	1:12	Macau, SAR, China	
Loss	10–3–1	Adrian Pang	Decision (split)	Legend FC 4	January 27, 2011	3	5:00	Hong Kong, SAR, China	Catchweight (154 lb) bout.
Win	10–2–1	Kota Okazawa	KO (punch)	Road FC 001	October 23, 2010	1	4:00	Seoul, South Korea	
Draw	9–2–1	Adrian Pang	Draw	Legend FC 1	January 11, 2010	3	5:00	Hong Kong, SAR, China	Fight of the Night.
Win	9–2	Hacran Dias	Decision (unanimous)	M-1 Challenge 17: Korea	July 4, 2009	3	5:00	Seoul, South Korea	
Loss	8–2	Dave Jansen	Decision (unanimous)	M-1 Challenge 14: Japan	April 29, 2009	2	5:00	Tokyo, Japan	
Loss	8–1	Mikhail Malyutin	Decision (majority)	M-1 Challenge 9: Russia	November 21, 2008	2	5:00	Saint Petersburg, Russia	
Win	8–0	Kim Se-young	TKO (punches)	Spirit MC 18	August 31, 2008	1	0:52	Seoul, South Korea	
Win	7–0	Yu Woo-sung	TKO (punches)	Spirit MC 10	November 4, 2006	2	0:22	Seoul, South Korea	Won the Spirit MC Welterweight Championship (155 lb).
Win	6–0	Choi Haeng-ki	Submission (rear-naked choke)	Spirit MC 10	November 4, 2006	2	1:55	Seoul, South Korea	
Win	5–0	Choi Yeong-gwang	Decision (majority)	Spirit MC 9	October 8, 2006	3	5:00	Seoul, South Korea	
Win	4–0	Jeon Chung-il	Decision (unanimous)	Spirit MC 8	April 22, 2006	3	5:00	Seoul, South Korea	Won the 2006 Spirit MC Welterweight Tournament.
Win	3–0	Choi Yeong-gwang	TKO (punches)	Spirit MC 8	April 22, 2006	1	0:23	Seoul, South Korea	2006 Spirit MC Welterweight Tournament Semifinal.
Win	2–0	Jang Duk-young	TKO (punches)	Spirit MC: Interleague 3	February 11, 2006	1	1:33	Seoul, South Korea	2006 Spirit MC Welterweight Tournament Quarterfinal.
Win	1–0	Jun Seong-yeop	KO (punch)	Spirit MC: Interleague 3	February 11, 2006	1	2:32	Seoul, South Korea	Lightweight debut. 2006 Spirit MC Welterweight Tournament Round of 16.

== See also ==
- List of current UFC fighters
- List of male mixed martial artists
