= Takasuke Kume =

Japanese mixed martial artist (born 1985)

Takasuke Kume 久米鷹介
- Born: April 28, 1985 (age 41); Nagoya, Aichi, Japan
- Other names: Da Jaguar
- Nationality: Japanese
- Height: 5 ft 7 in (1.70 m)
- Weight: 155 lb (70 kg; 11.1 st)
- Division: Lightweight (155 lb); Welterweight (170 lb)
- Style: Judo
- Fighting out of: Nagoya, Aichi, Japan
- Team: Alive
- Years active: 2007–present

Mixed martial arts record
- Total: 38
- Wins: 26
- By knockout: 3
- By submission: 14
- By decision: 9
- Losses: 8
- By knockout: 2
- By decision: 6
- Draws: 4

Other information
- Mixed martial arts record from Sherdog

Takasuke Kume (Japanese: 久米 鷹介, Kume Takasuke; born April 28, 1985) is a Japanese mixed martial artist who competes in the lightweight division.

== Mixed martial arts career ==
=== Shooto ===
Kume started his professional career in 2007. He fought mainly for Shooto, but also fought for Pancrase and Heat early in his career.

Kume faced Takuya Sato on December 13, 2008, at Shooto: The Rookie Tournament 2008 Final. While the fight was officially ruled a draw (19–19, 19–19, 19–19), Kume lost an extra round (10–9, 10–9, 10–9) and Sato was crowned the 2008 Shooto 167-pound rookie champion.

Kume faced Yoichiro Sato on August 7, 2010, at Shooto: Gig Tokyo 5 for the Shooto Pacific Rim 167-pound title. He lost via unanimous decision after three rounds.

Kume faced UFC veteran Shane Nelson on February 12, 2012, at Shooto: Gig Central 24 – Love and Courage. He won via submission due to a rear-naked choke in the second round.

In 2012, Kume signed with ROAD FC to compete in the lightweight tournament.

=== Road Fighting Championship ===
Kume faced Chang Hyun Kim on September 15, 2012, at Road FC 9: Beatdown in the lightweight tournament quarterfinal. He won via submission due to a rear-naked choke in the first round.

In the semifinal on November 24, 2012, at Road FC 10: Monson vs. Kang, Kume faced Chul Yoon. Once again he won via submission due to a rear-naked choke in round one.

In the final on April 13, 2013, at Road FC 11, Kume faced Yui Chul Nam. The fight went to an extra (fourth) round after the judges were unable to decide a winner. Kume lost the extra round via unanimous decision and Nam became the first-ever Road FC lightweight champion.

Kume was given an immediate rematch with Nam for the title on October 12, 2013, at Road FC 13. He lost via unanimous decision after three rounds.

=== Pancrase ===
On April 24, 2016, he fought against Eiji Ishikawa, who was ranked 9th in the lightweight ranking, at PANCRASE 277, which was the first bout in about a year since he underwent surgery for retinal detachment. He won the 2–1 split decision.

On September 11, 2016, he fought against the champion Kazuki Tokudome in the PANCRASE 280 Lightweight King of Pancrase title match . After overwhelming Tokudome with a stand hit from 1R, he finally won the TKO with a pound and succeeded in winning the title.

On December 10, 2017, he rematched with Kazuki Tokudome, who ranked first in the lightweight ranking, in the PANCRASE 292 Lightweight King of Pancrase title match. 81 seconds after the start of the bout, he won a KO with a left hook and succeeded in defending for the first time .

Kume fought against former UFC fighter Anton Kuivanen at PANCRASE 297 on July 1, 2018 . He received a punch just before the end of 2R and suffered the first knockout loss in his career.

Kume was scheduled to rematch Anton Kuivanen for the lightweight King of Pancrase title match on 2019 April 14 at PANCRASE 304. However, Kuivanen ruptured his left biceps, leading him to be replaced by HEAT lightweight champion Tom Santos. In 3R, he won a very single triangle choke from the mount position and succeeded in defending for the second time.

On October 13, 2019, at ONE Championship: Century Part 2 Pancrase x Shooto battle, Kume fought against Shooto champion Mitsufumi Matsumoto . He took advantage of the ground control in the 1st and 3rd rounds, and won the 3–0 decision .

On December 12, 2021, he played against the provisional champion, Tatsuya Saiga, in the PANCRASE 325 Lightweight King of Pancrase Championships. In the first round, he was knocked down by the right uppercut counter, but in the 2nd round, he won a come-from-behind victory by armbar, and succeeded in defending the title and unifying the title for the third time.

=== Rizin ===
On September 27, 2020, he played against Satoru Kitaoka in Rizin 24, which was his first participation in RIZIN, and won a 2–1 decision .

Kume faced top Japanese lightweight prospect Koji Takeda at Rizin 27 on March 21, 2021. In an action packed bout, Kume lost the bout via unanimous decision.

On April 30, 2023, he fought against the interim champion Akira Okada in the lightweight King of Pancrase throne unification match at PANCRASE 333, losing a split decision and failing to unify the throne, holding it for about 7 years and 7 months.

== Championships and accomplishments ==
=== Mixed martial arts ===
- Road Fighting Championship
  - Road FC lightweight tournament finalist
- Pancrase
  - Pancrase Lightweight Championship (one time, current)

== Mixed martial arts record ==
Professional record breakdown
38 matches	26 wins	8 losses
By knockout	3	2
By submission	14	0
By decision	9	6
Draws	4	

Res.	Record	Opponent	Method	Event	Date	Round	Time	Location	Notes
Loss	26–8–4	Tatsuya Saika	KO (punches)	Pancrase 347	September 29, 2024	2	0:27	Tachikawa, Japan	For the vacant Pancrase Lightweight Championship.
Win	26–7–4	Yusuke Kasuya	Decision (unanimous)	Pancrase 342	April 29, 2024	3	5:00	Tachikawa, Japan	
Loss	25–7–4	Akira Okada	Decision (split)	Pancrase 333	April 30, 2023	5	5:00	Tachikawa, Japan	Lost the Pancrase Lightweight Championship.
Win	25–6–4	Tatsuya Saika	Submission (armbar)	Pancrase 325	December 11, 2021	2	2:28	Tokyo, Japan	Defended and unified the Pancrase Lightweight Championship.
Loss	24–6–4	Koji Takeda	Decision (unanimous)	Rizin 27	March 21, 2021	3	5:00	Nagoya, Japan	
Win	24–5–4	Satoru Kitaoka	Decision (split)	Rizin 24	September 27, 2020	3	5:00	Saitama, Japan	
Win	23–5–4	Koshi Matsumoto	Decision (unanimous)	ONE Championship: Century Part 2	October 13, 2019	3	5:00	Tokyo, Japan	
Win	22–5–4	Tom Santos	Submission (triangle choke)	Pancrase 304	April 14, 2019	3	1:08	Tokyo, Japan	Defended the Pancrase Lightweight Championship.
Loss	21–5–4	Anton Kuivanen	TKO (punches)	Pancrase 297	July 1, 2018	2	4:56	Tokyo, Japan	Non-title bout.
Win	21–4–4	Kazuki Tokudome	KO (punch)	Pancrase 292	December 10, 2017	1	1:21	Tokyo, Japan	Defended the Pancrase Lightweight Championship.
Win	20–4–4	Matija Blazicevic	Submission (rear-naked choke)	Pancrase 286	April 23, 2017	2	1:05	Tokyo, Japan	
Win	19–4–4	Kazuki Tokudome	TKO (ground & pound)	Pancrase 280	September 11, 2016	1	4:45	Tokyo, Japan	Won the Pancrase Lightweight Championship.
Win	18–4–4	Eiji Ishikawa	Decision (split)	Pancrase 277	April 24, 2016	3	5:00	Tokyo, Japan	
Win	17–4–4	Taisuke Okuno	Decision (unanimous)	Pancrase 266	April 26, 2015	3	5:00	Tokyo, Japan	
Loss	16–4–4	A Sol Kwon	Decision (majority)	Road FC 17	August 17, 2014	3	5:00	Seoul, South Korea	For the Road FC Lightweight title.
Win	16–3–4	Eduardo Simoes	Decision (unanimous)	Road FC 14	February 9, 2014	3	5:00	Seoul, South Korea	
Loss	15–3–4	Yui Chul Nam	Decision (unanimous)	Road FC 13	October 12, 2013	3	5:00	Gumi, South Korea	For the Road FC Lightweight title.
Loss	15–2–4	Yui Chul Nam	Decision (unanimous)	Road FC 11	April 13, 2013	4	5:00	Seoul, South Korea	Road FC Lightweight tournament final. For the inaugural Road FC Lightweight title.
Win	15–1–4	Chul Yoon	Submission (rear-naked choke)	Road FC 10: Monson vs. Kang	November 24, 2012	1	2:19	Busan, South Korea	Road FC Lightweight tournament semifinal.
Win	14–1–4	Chang Hyun Kim	Submission (rear-naked choke)	Road FC 9: Beatdown	September 15, 2012	1	3:27	Wonju, South Korea	Road FC Lightweight tournament quarterfinal.
Win	13–1–4	Koji Nakamura	Submission (triangle choke)	Pancrase: Progress Tour 7	June 2, 2012	2	1:58	Tokyo, Japan	
Win	12–1–4	Hyung Seok Lee	Submission (armbar)	Road FC 7: Recharged	March 24, 2012	2	0:54	Seoul, South Korea	
Win	11–1–4	Shane Nelson	Submission (rear-naked choke)	Shooto: Gig Central 24 – Love and Courage	February 12, 2012	2	1:54	Nagoya, Aichi, Japan	
Win	10–1–4	Daisuke Hanazawa	Submission (rear-naked choke)	Pancrase: Impressive Tour 12	November 27, 2011	3	4:01	Osaka, Japan	
Win	9–1–4	Masahiro Toryu	Submission (rear-naked choke)	Pancrase: Impressive Tour 7	July 31, 2011	1	1:44	Osaka, Japan	
Win	8–1–4	Jung Min Kang	Submission (kimura)	Shooto: Gig Central 22	April 17, 2011	2	1:23	Nagoya, Aichi, Japan	
Win	7–1–4	Daniel Digby	Submission (rear-naked choke)	Shooto Australia - Superfight Australia 9	November 5, 2010	1	4:13	Joondalup, Australia	
Loss	6–1–4	Yoichiro Sato	Decision (unanimous)	Shooto: Gig Tokyo 5	August 7, 2010	3	5:00	Tokyo, Japan	For Shooto Pacific Rim 167 lb title.
Win	6–0–4	Akihiro Yamazaki	Decision (unanimous)	Shooto: Gig Central 20	June 13, 2010	3	5:00	Nagoya, Aichi, Japan	
Win	5–0–4	Kenta Takagi	Decision (unanimous)	Shooto: Gig Central 19	October 25, 2009	2	5:00	Nagoya, Aichi, Japan	
Draw	4–0–4	Taisuke Okuno	Draw	Shooto: Gig Central 18	August 30, 2009	2	5:00	Nagoya, Aichi, Japan	
Win	4–0–3	Hirosumi Sugiura	Decision (split)	Shooto: Gig Central 17	April 12, 2009	2	5:00	Nagoya, Aichi, Japan	
Draw	3–0–3	Takuya Sato	Draw	Shooto: The Rookie Tournament 2008 Final	December 13, 2008	2	5:00	Tokyo, Japan	For 2008 Shooto rookie title (167 lb).
Draw	3–0–2	Yoichiro Sato	Draw	Shooto: Gig Central 15	August 3, 2008	2	5:00	Nagoya, Aichi, Japan	
Win	3–0–1	Yoshifumi Dogaki	TKO (doctor stoppage)	Shooto: Gig Central 14	March 16, 2008	1	3:38	Nagoya, Aichi, Japan	
Win	2–0–1	Takuya Sato	Submission (rear-naked choke)	Shooto: Gig Central 13	October 8, 2007	1	1:11	Nagoya, Aichi, Japan	
Win	1–0–1	Yasushi Tsujimoto	Submission (rear-naked choke)	Heat 4	August 11, 2007	2	3:07	Nagoya, Aichi, Japan	
Draw	0–0–1	Tomokazu Yuasa	Draw	Shooto: Gig Central 12	March 25, 2007	2	5:00	Nagoya, Aichi, Japan	
