= 2022 in Road FC =

Mixed martial arts events

Road Fighting Championship

Information
- First date: January 18, 2022

Events

Fights

Chronology
2021 in Road FC	Road Fighting Championship	2023 in Road FC

The year 2022 was the 13th year in the history of the Road Fighting Championship, a mixed martial arts promotion based in South Korea. 2022 starts with ARC 7.

== List of events ==
List of events in 2022
#	Event title	Main event	Date	Arena	Location
1	ARC 7	Seol vs. Song	January 18, 2022	Lotte World Afreeca Colosseum, Lotte World Tower	Seoul, South Korea
2	ROAD FC 60	Kim vs. Park	May 12, 2022	Daegu Gymnasium	Daegu, South Korea
3	ROAD FC 61	Park vs. Park	July 23, 2022	Wonju Gymnasium	Wonju, South Korea
4	ARC 8	Lee vs. Choi	November 13, 2022	Lotte World Afreeca Colosseum, Lotte World Tower	Seoul, South Korea
5	ROAD FC 62	Park vs. Yeo	December 18, 2022	Swiss Grand Hotel	Seoul, South Korea

== ARC 7 ==
ARC 7

Information
- Promotion: Road Fighting Championship
- Date: January 18, 2022
- Venue: Lotte World Afreeca Colosseum
- City: Seoul, South Korea

Event chronology
ARC 6	ARC 7	ROAD FC 60

AfreecaTV ROAD Championship ARC 7 was a mixed martial arts event scheduled to be held by Road FC on January 18, 2022, at the Lotte World Afreeca Colosseum, Lotte World Tower in Seoul, South Korea.

=== Background ===
An openweight bout between debuting Young Ho Seol and Uchiha Song was scheduled as the event headliner. An openweight bout was scheduled for the event co-feature as well, which saw Dong Hyun Bae face Ho Yeon Jung.

A 63 kg catchweight bout between Ji Hoon Son and Kil Soo Lee was scheduled as the featured fight of the evening.

=== Results ===
ARC 7
Weight Class				Method	Round	T.Time	Notes
Openweight	(South Korea) Yeon Ho Seol	def.	(South Korea) Uchiha Song	Decision (Unanimous)	3	3:00	
Openweight	(South Korea) Dong Hyun Bae	def.	(South Korea) Ho Yeon Jung	TKO (Punches)	2	2:29	
Catchweight 63 kg	(South Korea) Su Lee Gil	def.	(South Korea) Ji Hoon Son	Decision (Unanimous)	3	3:00	
Catchweight 75 kg	(South Korea) Seong Won Lee	def.	(South Korea) Jun Mo Lee	TKO (Punch)	1	1:23	
Lightweight 70 kg	(South Korea) Ji Woong Choi	def.	(South Korea) Min Woo Kwon	TKO (Referee Stoppage)			
Lightweight 70 kg	(South Korea) Sergey Lim	def.	(South Korea) Jong Heon Kim	Submission (Kneebar)	2	1:21	
Catchweight 68 kg	(South Korea) Jin Guk Kim	def.	(South Korea) Jung Hyun Lee	Submission (Von Flue choke)	2	1:47	
Bantamweight 61 kg	(South Korea) Shin Woo Lee	def.	(South Korea) Jae Hoon Lee	Decision (Split)	3	3:00	

== Road FC 60 ==
Road FC 60

Information
- Promotion: Road Fighting Championship
- Date: May 13, 2022
- Venue: Daegu Gymnasium
- City: Daegu, South Korea

ROAD FC 60 will be a mixed martial arts event scheduled to be held by Road FC on April 30, 2022, at the Lotte World Afreeca Colosseum, Daegu Gymnasium in Daegu, South Korea.

=== Background ===
A ROAD FC Featherweight title bout between the reigning champion Hae Jin Park and title challenger Soo Chul Kim was booked as the event headliner.

A ROAD FC Bantamweight title bout for the vacant title between Ik Hwan Jang and Je Hoon Moon was scheduled as the co-main event.

A special three-round boxing exhibition bout between A Sol Kwon and Young Ho Seol was booked for the event.

=== Fight Card ===
Road FC 60
Weight Class				Method	Round	Time	Notes
Featherweight 66 kg	(South Korea) Soo Chul Kim	def.	(South Korea) Hae Jin Park (c)	TKO (Head Kick and Punches)	2	0:09	For the Road FC Featherweight Championship
Catchweight 84.8 kg	(South Korea) Young Ho Seol	def.	(South Korea) A Sol Kwon	Decision (Unanimous)	3	3:00	Boxing exhibition bout
Flyweight 57 kg	(South Korea) Jung Hyun Lee	def.	(Japan) Seigo Yamamoto	TKO (Punch)	1	3:12	
Bantamweight 61 kg	(South Korea) Ji Yong Yang	def.	(South Korea) Hyun Woo Kim	Submission (Guillotine Choke)	3	2:03	
Catchweight 73 kg	(South Korea) Je Woo Yeo	def.	(Mongolia) Nandin-Erdene Munguntsooj	Decision (Unanimous)	3	5:00	
Middleweight 84 kg	(South Korea) Tae Young Yoon	def.	(South Korea) Dong Hwan Lim	Decision (Unanimous)	3	5:00	
Lead Card
Lightweight 70 kg	(South Korea) Kyung Bin Jang	def.	(South Korea) Ji Hwan Yang	Decision (Unanimous)	2	5:00	
W.Strawweight 52 kg	(South Korea) Seo Young Park	def.	(South Korea) Nayeon Ko	Decision (Unanimous)	2	5:00	
Bantamweight 61 kg	(South Korea) Jung Hyun Lee	def.	(South Korea) Shin Woo Lee	Decision (Split)	2	5:00	
Catchweight 58 kg	(South Korea) Jae Bok Jung	def.	(South Korea) Young Chan Choi	KO (Punches)	2	0:31	
Flyweight 57 kg	(South Korea) Jin Woo Park	def.	(South Korea) Jun Seok Kim	TKO (Punches)	1	1:54	
Bantamweight 61 kg	(South Korea) Jin Guk Kim	def.	(South Korea) Min Kyu Cho	Submission (Rear-Naked Choke)	1	3:46	
Lightweight 70 kg	(South Korea) Min Hyun Kim	def.	(South Korea) Jun Won Wi	Decision (Split)	2	5:00	
Flyweight 57 kg	(South Korea) Jae Min Son	def.	(South Korea) Dong Hyun Jeon	Decision (Split)	2	5:00	

== Road FC 61 ==
Road FC 61

Information
- Promotion: Road Fighting Championship
- Date: July 23, 2022
- Venue: Wonju Gymnasium
- City: Wonju, South Korea

Road FC 61 was a mixed martial arts event scheduled to be held by Road FC on July 23, 2022, at the Wonju Gymnasium in Wonju, South Korea.

=== Background ===
A Road FC Lightweight Championship bout for the vacant title between Si Won Park and Seung Mo Park was booked as the event headliner. A flyweight bout between Jung Hyun Lee and Taiki Akiba served as the co-main event.

=== Fight card ===
Road FC 61
Weight Class				Method	Round	Time	Notes
Lightweight 70 kg	(South Korea) Si Won Park	def.	(South Korea) Seung Mo Park	TKO (Knee and Punches)	1	4:01	For the vacant Road FC Lightweight Championship
Flyweight 57 kg	(South Korea) Jung Hyun Lee	def.	(Japan) Taiki Akiba	Decision (Unanimous)	3	5:00	
Catchweight 76 kg	(Mongolia) Nandin-Erdene Munguntsooj	def.	(South Korea) Dong Guk Shin	TKO (Punch)	3	2:40	
W.Atomweight 48 kg	(South Korea) Jeong Eun Park	def.	(South Korea) Yoon Ha Hong	TKO (Punches)	1	2:58	
Openweight	(South Korea) Gun Oh Shim	def.	(South Korea) Dong Hyun Bae	Submission (Americana)	1	1:11	
Light Heavyweight 93 kg	(South Korea) Tae In Kim	def.	(South Korea) Jung Kyo Park	TKO (Submission to Punches)	1	0:25	
Part 1
Bantamweight 61 kg	(South Korea) Jae Min Son	def.	(South Korea) Jae Nam Yoo	Decision (Split)	2	5:00	
Catchweight 75 kg	(South Korea) Ji Un Choi	def.	(South Korea) Jung Gyu Lee	TKO (Head Kick and Punches)	2	1:57	
Middleweight 84 kg	(South Korea) Jin Seob Jung	def.	(South Korea) Uchiha Song	TKO (Knees to the Body and Punches)	1	1:38	
Catchweight 63 kg	(South Korea) Jae Sung Park	def.	(South Korea) Jung Hyun Lee	Decision (Unanimous)	2	5:00	
Featherweight 66 kg	(South Korea) Min Hyung Han	def.	(South Korea) Min Soo Park	Decision (Split)	2	5:00	
Flyweight 57 kg	(South Korea) Jae Hoon Lee	def.	(South Korea) Young Chan Choi	Decision (Unanimous)	2	5:00	

== ARC 8 ==
ARC 8

Information
- Promotion: Road Fighting Championship
- Date: November 13, 2022
- Venue: Lotte World Afreeca Colosseum
- City: Seoul, South Korea

ARC 8 was a mixed martial arts event scheduled to be held by Road FC on November 13, 2022, at the Lotte World Afreeca Colosseum in Seoul, South Korea.

=== Background ===
The event was headlined by a 139 lbs catchweight bout between Sergei Choi and Kil Soo Lee.

=== Fight card ===
ARC 8
Weight Class				Method	Round	Time	Notes
Catchweight 63 kg	(South Korea) Sergei Choi	def.	(South Korea) Kil Soo Lee	Decision (Unanimous)	3	3:00	
Catchweight 90 kg	(South Korea) Dong Hwan Lim	def.	(South Korea) Seung Ho Jung	Decision (Unanimous)	3	3:00	
Catchweight 55 kg	(South Korea) Yoo Jung Kim	def.	(South Korea) Eun Jung Lee	Submission (Rear-Naked Choke)	3	2:08	
Catchweight 75 kg	(South Korea) Sang Kwon Han	def.	(South Korea) Min Hyung Kim	Decision (Unanimous)	3	3:00	
Featherweight 65 kg	(South Korea) Jin Guk Kim	def.	(South Korea) Shin Woo Lee	TKO (Punches)	1	1:58	
Featherweight 65 kg	(South Korea) Jun Seok Kim	def.	(South Korea) Jung Won Wi	Decision (Unanimous)	3	3:00	
Middleweight 83 kg	(South Korea) Woo Young Han	def.	(South Korea) Kyung Jin Ko	Decision (Unanimous)	3	3:00	

== ROAD FC 62 ==
ROAD FC 62

Information
- Promotion: Road Fighting Championship
- Date: December 18, 2022
- Venue: Swiss Grand Hotel
- City: Seoul, South Korea

ROAD FC 62 was a mixed martial arts event scheduled to be held by Road FC on December 18, 2022, at the Swiss Grand Hotel in Seoul, South Korea.

=== Background ===
A ROAD FC lightweight championship bout between champion Si Won Park and title challenger Je Woo Yeo headlined the event, while a 161 lbs catchweight bout between A Sol Kwon and Koji Nakamura served as the co-main event.

=== Fight card ===
ROAD FC 62
Weight Class				Method	Round	Time	Notes
Lightweight 70 kg	(South Korea) Si Won Park (c)	def.	(South Korea) Je Woo Yeo	Decision (Unanimous)	3	5:00	For the ROAD FC Lightweight Championship
Catchweight 73 kg	(Japan) Koji Nakamura	def.	(South Korea) A Sol Kwon	Decision (Unanimous)	3	5:00	
Bantamweight 61 kg	(South Korea) Je Hoon Moon	def.	(South Korea) Ik Hwan Jang	Decision (Unanimous)	3	5:00	For the vacant ROAD FC Bantamweight Championship
Lightweight 70 kg	(South Korea) Hae Jin Park (c)	def.	(South Korea) Seung Mo Park	Technical Submission (Arm-Triangle Choke)	2	4:40	For the ROAD FC Featherweight Championship
Light Heavyweight 93 kg	(South Korea) Tae In Kim	def.	(Brazil) Daniel Gomes	KO (Punch and Knee)	1	0:13	For the inaugural ROAD FC Light Heavyweight Championship
Middleweight 84 kg	(South Korea) Tae Young Yoon	def.	(South Korea) Young Chul Lee	KO (Head Kick)	1	3:31	
Prelims
Bantamweight 61 kg	(Russia) Vitaliy Mironyuk	def.	(South Korea) Jin Guk Kim	Submission (Baseball Choke)	1	4:21	
Bantamweight 61 kg	(South Korea) Yoon Seo Shin	def.	(South Korea) Sang Kwon Han	Submission (Rear-Naked Choke)	2	3:11	
Flyweight 57 kg	(South Korea) Jae Min Son	def.	(South Korea) Jae Bok Jung	KO (Knee to the Body)	2	1:21	
Catchweight 60 kg	(South Korea) Dong Soo Seo	def.	(South Korea) Young Chan Choi	Decision (Unanimous)	3	5:00	
Catchweight 50 kg	(South Korea) Yoo Jung Kim	def.	(South Korea) Seo Young Park	Submission (Rear-Naked Choke)	1	2:53	
Bantamweight 61 kg	(South Korea) Min Hyuk Cha	def.	(South Korea) Tae Sun Hong	Decision (Unanimous)	2	5:00	
Featherweight 66 kg	(South Korea) Jung Hyun Lee	def.	(South Korea) Min Hyung Han	Decision (Unanimous)	2	5:00	

== See also ==
- List of Road FC events
- List of Road FC champions
- List of current Road FC fighters
- List of current mixed martial arts champions
- 2022 in UFC
- 2022 in Bellator MMA
- 2022 in ONE Championship
- 2022 in Absolute Championship Akhmat
- 2022 in Konfrontacja Sztuk Walki
- 2022 in Rizin Fighting Federation
- 2022 in LUX Fight League
- 2022 in AMC Fight Nights
- 2022 in Brave Combat Federation
- 2022 Professional Fighters League season
- 2022 in Eagle Fighting Championship
- 2022 in Legacy Fighting Alliance
