= 2019 in Road FC =

Mixed martial arts events

Information
- Promotion: Road Fighting Championship
- First date: February 23, 2019

Events

Fights

Chronology
| 2018 in Road FC | 2019 in Road FC | 2020 in Road FC |

The year 2019 was the 10th year in the history of the Road Fighting Championship, a mixed martial arts promotion based in South Korea. 2019 starts with Road FC 052.

== Road FC $1 Million Dollar Lightweight Tournament 'Road To A-Sol' Bracket ==
1st Round; Road FC 040 (2017-7-15)
(China) Yincang Bao | TKO
(Philippines) Reydon Romero | 2
(Japan) Kota Shimoishi | SUB
(South Korea) Dae Seong Park | 3
(Brazil) Toninho Furia | 1
(Mongolia) Nandin Erdene | TKO
(South Korea) Chang Hyun Kim | 1
(France) Mansour Barnaoui | SUB
(Russia) Shamil Zavurov | DEC
(United States) Leo Kuntz | 3
(Japan) Shinji Sasaki | 1
(Mongolia) Khuukhenkhuu Amartuvshin | KO
(Brazil) Tom Santos | TKO
(South Korea) Yui Chul Nam | 1
(Brazil) Ronys Torres | SUB
(Russia) Elnur Agaev | 1

2nd Round; Road FC 044 (2017-11-11)
(China) Yincang Bao | 2
(Japan) Kota Shimoishi | SUB
(Mongolia) Nandin Erdene | 1
(France) Mansour Barnaoui | SUB
(Russia) Shamil Zavurov | DEC
(Mongolia) Khuukhenkhuu Amartuvshin | 3
(Brazil) Tom Santos | 1
(Brazil) Ronys Torres | SUB

Semi-finals; Road FC 046 (2018-03-10)
(Japan) Kota Shimoishi | 2
(France) Mansour Barnaoui | SUB
(Russia) Shamil Zavurov | DEC
(Brazil) Ronys Torres | 3

Final; Road FC 052 (2019-02-23)
(France) Mansour Barnaoui | KO
(Russia) Shamil Zavurov | 3

Championship; Road FC 053 (2019-05-18)
(France) Mansour Barnaoui | SUB
(South Korea) A Sol Kwon (c) | 1

== List of events ==
List of events in 2019
| # | Event Title | Main Event | Date | Arena | Location |
|---|---|---|---|---|---|
| 6 | Road FC 057 XX | Park vs. Shim | December 14, 2019 | Convention Centre, Grand Hilton Seoul | (South Korea) Seoul |
| 5 | Road FC 056 | Zavurov vs. Kwon | November 9, 2019 | Jinnam Gymnasium | (South Korea) Yeosu, South Jeolla Province |
| 4 | Road FC 055 | Lee vs. Park | September 8, 2019 | Daegu Gymnasium | (South Korea) Daegu |
| 3 | Road FC 054 | La vs. Yang | June 15, 2019 | Wonju Gymnasium | (South Korea) Wonju, Gangwon province |
| 2 | Road FC 053 | Kwon vs. Barnaoui | May 18, 2019 | Halla Gymnasium | (South Korea) Jeju |
| 1 | Road FC 052 | Zavurov vs. Barnaoui | February 23, 2019 | Jangchung Gymnasium | (South Korea) Seoul |

== Title fights ==
Title fights in 2019
| # | Weight Class | | | | Method | Round | Time | Event | Notes |
|---|---|---|---|---|---|---|---|---|---|
| 4 | 61.5 kg Bantamweight | (South Korea) Min Woo Kim (c) | def. | (South Korea) Ik Hwan Jang | Ext.R Decision (Unanimous) | 4/3 | 5:00 | Road FC 56 | For the Road FC Bantamweight Championship |
| 3 | 65.5 kg Featherweight · | (South Korea) Jeong Yeong Lee (c) | def. | (South Korea) Hae Jin Park | KO (Punches) | 1/3 | 0:10 | Road FC 55 | For the Road FC Featherweight Championship |
| 2 | 80.0 kg Middleweight | (South Korea) Hae Jun Yang | def. | (South Korea) In Jae La (c) | TKO (Punches) | 2/3 | 3:57 | Road FC 53 | For the Road FC Middleweight Championship |
| 1 | 61.5 kg Bantamweight | (South Korea) Min Woo Kim | def. | (South Korea) Je Hoon Moon | Submission (Triangle Choke) | 1/3 | 2:15 | Road FC 52 | For the vacant Road FC Bantamweight Championship |

== Road FC 057 XX ==
Road FC 057 XX

Information
- Promotion: Road Fighting Championship
- Date: December 14, 2019
- Venue: Convention Centre, Grand Hilton Seoul
- City: (South Korea) Seoul

Event chronology
| Road FC 056 | Road FC 057 XX | Road FC 058 |

Goobne mall Road FC 057 XX is a mixed martial arts event scheduled to be held by Road FC on December 14, 2019, at the Convention Centre, Grand Hilton Seoul in Seoul, South Korea.

=== Fight card ===
Road FC 057 XX
| Weight class | | | | Method | Round | Time | Notes |
|---|---|---|---|---|---|---|---|
| Women's -48.0 kg Atomweight | (South Korea) Jeong Eun Park | def. | (South Korea) Yuri Shim | TKO (Punches) | 2/3 | 1:09 |
| Women's -50.0 kg Catchweight | (China) Shi Ming | def. | (South Korea) Su Yeon Lee | Decision (Unanimous) | 2/2 | 5:00 |
| Women's -60.0 kg Catchweight | (Japan) Yukari Nabe | def. | (United States) Rowan Pilger | Decision (Unanimous) | 2/2 | 5:00 |
| Women's -49.0 kg Catchweight | (South Korea) Yun Ha Hong | def. | (Japan) Emi Tomimatsu | Decision (Unanimous) | 2/2 | 5:00 |
| Women's -57.0 kg Flyweight (Kickboxing) | (South Korea) Ha Jung Park | vs. | (South Korea) Hyun Ju Oh | | /2 | | (Note: Kick Boxing Bout) |
| Women's -48.0 kg Atomweight | (South Korea) Yu Jin Shin | def. | (South Korea) Hye In Kim | Decision (Split) | 2/2 | 5:00 |
Road FC 057
| Weight class | | | | Method | Round | Time | Notes |
| -77.0 kg Welterweight | (South Korea) Yui Chul Nam | def. | (South Korea) Dong Guk Shin | Decision (Unanimous) | 3/3 | 5:00 |
| -70.0 kg Lightweight (Grappling) | (South Korea) Su Chul Kim | vs. | (Japan) Takumi Nakayama | | /1 | | (Note: Grappling Bout) |
| -70.0 kg Lightweight (Grappling) | (South Korea) Yun Jun Lee | vs. | (Japan) Shunichi Shimizu | | /1 | | (Note: Grappling Bout) |
| -84.0 kg Middleweight | (South Korea) In Jae La | def. | (South Korea) Eun Soo Lee | Decision (Unanimous) | 2/2 | 5:00 |
| -65.5 kg Featherweight | (South Korea) Hyung Geun Park | def. | (United States) Mike Galitello | Decision (Unanimous) | 2/2 | 5:00 |
| -70.0 kg Lightweight | (Mongolia) Nandin Erdene | def. | (South Korea) Yun Jae Jung | TKO (Punches) | 1/2 | 4:26 |
| -77.0 kg Welterweight | (South Korea) San Kim | def. | (South Korea) Ji Un Choi | Submission (Armbar) | 1/2 | 0:54 |
| -65.5 kg Featherweight | (South Korea) Tae Sung Kim | def. | (South Korea) Doo Seok Oh | Submission (Rear-Naked Choke) | 2/2 | 4:55 |

== Road FC 056 ==
Road FC 056

Information
- Promotion: Road Fighting Championship
- Date: November 9, 2019
- Venue: Jinnam Gymnasium
- City: (South Korea) Yeosu, South Jeolla Province

Event chronology
| Road FC 055 | Road FC 056 | Road FC 057 XX |

Goobne mall Road FC 056 was a mixed martial arts event held by Road Fighting Championship on November 9, 2019 at the Jinnam Gymnasium in Yeosu, South Jeolla Province, South Korea.

=== Fight card ===
Main card
| Weight class | | | | Method | Round | Time | Notes |
|---|---|---|---|---|---|---|---|
| Lightweight | (Russia) Shamil Zavurov | def. | (South Korea) A Sol Kwon | Decision (Unanimous) | 3/3 | 5:00 |
| Bantamweight | (South Korea) Min Woo Kim (c) | def. | (South Korea) Ik Hwan Jang | Ext.R Decision (Unanimous) | 4/3 | 5:00 | (Note: For the Road FC Bantamweight Championship) |
| Middleweight | (Brazil) Henrique Shiguemoto | def. | (South Korea) Won Jun Choi | TKO (Punches) | 1/3 | 0:29 |
| Middleweight | (South Korea) In Soo Hwang | def. | (South Korea) Eun Soo Kim | KO (Punch) | 1/3 | 3:51 |
| Featherweight | (South Korea) Se Young Kim | def. | (South Korea) Dae Young Jang | Decision (Unanimous) | 2/2 | 5:00 |
| Bantamweight | (Kyrgyzstan) Alexey Fedoseev | def. | (South Korea) Gi Won Go | Decision (Unanimous) | 2/2 | 5:00 |
Young guns 045
| Weight class | | | | Method | Round | Time | Notes |
| Bantamweight | (South Korea) Seok Han Park | def. | (Japan) Seigo Yamamoto | TKO (Punches) | 1/2 | 2:45 |
| Featherweight | (South Korea) Chan Soo Park | def. | (South Korea) Ui Jong Kim | Decision (Unanimous) | 2/2 | 5:00 |
| Women's -63 kg Catchweight | (South Korea) Ha Jung Park | def. | (South Korea) Na Young Park | TKO (Punches) | 1/2 | 0:40 |
| Openweight | (South Korea) Il Hak Oh | def. | (South Korea) Ho Jun Lee | Decision (Unanimous) | 2/2 | 5:00 |
| Women's Strawweight | (South Korea) Ji Soo Park | def. | (South Korea) Eun Jung Lee | TKO (Punches) | 1/2 | 0:25 |
| Lightweight | (South Korea) Ji Hyuk Choi | def. | (South Korea) Seok Chan Jung | TKO (Injury by Knee) | 1/2 | 5:00 |

== Road FC 055 ==
Road FC 055

Information
- Promotion: Road Fighting Championship
- Date: September 8, 2019
- Venue: Daegu Gymnasium
- City: Daegu, South Korea

Event chronology
| Road FC 054 | Road FC 055 | Road FC 056 |

Goobne mall Road FC 056 was a mixed martial arts event held by Road Fighting Championship on September 8, 2019 at the Daegu Gymnasium in Daegu, South Korea.

=== Background ===
The event featured the first title defense for Road FC Featherweight Champion Jeong-Yeong Lee against fellow countryman Hae-Jin Park as the Road FC 55 headliner.

=== Results ===
Main card
| Weight class | | | | Method | Round | Time | Notes |
|---|---|---|---|---|---|---|---|
| Featherweight | (South Korea) Jeong Yeong Lee (c) | def. | (South Korea) Hae-Jin Park | KO (Punches) | 1/3 | 0:10 | (Note: For the Road FC Featherweight Championship) |
| Openweight | (United States) Chris Barnett | def. | (South Korea) Gun Oh Shim | TKO (Punches) | 1/3 | 3:44 |
| Lightweight | (Mongolia) Nandin Erdene | def. | (South Korea) Young Ki Hong | TKO (Punches) | 1/3 | 0:29 |
| Flyweight | (South Korea) Won Hee Jeong | def. | (Russia) Emil Abasov | KO (Punch) | 1/3 | 3:51 |
| Women's -53 kg Catchweight | (South Korea) Yun Ha Hong | def. | (South Korea) Kyo Lin Kim | Decision (Unanimous) | 2/2 | 5:00 |
| Weltererweight | (South Korea) Yun Jae Jung | def. | (South Korea) Hyung Seok Lee | Decision (Unanimous) | 2/2 | 5:00 |
Young guns 044
| Weight class | | | | Method | Round | Time | Notes |
| Flyweight | (South Korea) Ho Young Yun | def. | (Japan) Takagi Yamato | Submission (Rear-Naked Choke) | 2/2 | 0:29 |
| Featherweight | (South Korea) Je Woo Yeo | def. | (South Korea) Ji Seung Shin | Decision (Unanimous) | 2/2 | 5:00 |
| Bantamweight | (South Korea) Jae Hwan Shin | def. | (South Korea) Jin Kuk Kim | Decision (Unanimous) | 2/2 | 5:00 |
| Openweight | (South Korea) Il Hak Oh | def. | (South Korea) Ho Jun Lee | Decision (Unanimous) | 2/2 | 5:00 |
| Lightweight | (South Korea) Woo Hyuk Choi | def. | (Kyrgyzstan) Shoiatbek Bazarbaev | Decision (Unanimous) | 2/2 | 5:00 |
| Bantamweight | (South Korea) Jeong Hyeon Lee | def. | (South Korea) Chang-Hwan Hwang | Decision (Unanimous) | 2/2 | 5:00 |
| Featherweight | (South Korea) Tae Sung Kim | def. | (South Korea) Ji Hwan Yang | Decision (Unanimous) | 2/2 | 5:00 |

== Road FC 054 ==
Road FC 054

Information
- Promotion: Road Fighting Championship
- Date: June 15, 2019
- Venue: Wonju Gymnasium
- City: (South Korea) Wonju, Gangwon-do

Event chronology
| Road FC 053 | Road FC 054 | Road FC 055 |

Goobne mall Road FC 054 was a mixed martial arts event scheduled to be held by Road FC on June 15, 2019, at the Wonju Gymnasium in Wonju, Gangwon-do, South Korea.

=== Fight card ===
Main card
| Weight class | | | | Method | Round | Time | Notes |
|---|---|---|---|---|---|---|---|
| Middleweight | (South Korea) Hae Jun Yang | def. | (South Korea) In Jae La (c) | TKO (ground & pound) | 2/3 | 8:57 | (Note: For Road FC Middleweight Championship) |
| Featherweight | (South Korea) Se Young Kim | def. | (Russia) Evgeniy Ryazanov | Decision (unanimous) | 3/3 | 5:00 |
| Middleweight | (South Korea) Won Jun Choi | def. | (South Korea) In Soo Hwang | TKO (punches) | 1/3 | 0:05 |
| Bantamweight | (South Korea) Jae Nam Yoo | def. | (South Korea) Tae Gyun Kim | Submission (rear naked choke) | 1/3 | 3:05 |
| Openweight | (South Korea) Gun Oh Shim | def. | (South Korea) Gi Hoon Ryu | TKO (punches) | 1/3 | 0:54 |
| Bantamweight | (South Korea) Ik Hwan Jang | def. | (South Korea) Sang Jin Jung | Decision (unanimous) | 2/2 | 5:00 |
Young guns 043
| Weight class | | | | Method | Round | Time | Notes |
| Women's Atomweight | (South Korea) Jeong Eun Park | def. | (South Korea) Eun Hye Kim | Submission (arm triangle choke) | 2/2 | 2:51 |
| Featherweight | (South Korea) Doo Seok Oh | def. | (South Korea) Chan Soo Park | Decision (split) | 2/2 | 5:00 |
| Bantamweight | (South Korea) Jae Sung Park | def. | (South Korea) Yeong Han Kim | Submission (guillotine choke) | 2/2 | 2:42 |
| Lightweight | (South Korea) Jung Hyuk Jang | def. | (South Korea) Woo Hyuk Choi | Decision (unanimous) | 2/2 | 5:00 |
| Women's Bantamweight | (United States) Rowan Pilger | def. | (South Korea) Ha Jung Park | Submission (armbar) | 2/2 | 2:25 |
| Bantamweight | (South Korea) Sung Jun Park | def. | (South Korea) Jin Guk Kim | Decision (split) | 2/2 | 5:00 |

== Road FC 053 ==
Road FC 053

Information
- Promotion: Road Fighting Championship
- Date: May 18, 2019
- Venue: Halla Gymnasium
- City: (South Korea) Jeju

Event chronology
| Road FC 052 | Road FC 053 | Road FC 054 |

Goobne mall Road FC 053 was a mixed martial arts event scheduled to be held by Road FC on May 18, 2019, at the Halla Gymnasium in Jeju, South Korea.

=== Fight card ===
Main card
| Weight class | | | | Method | Round | Time | Notes |
|---|---|---|---|---|---|---|---|
| Lightweight | (France) Mansour Barnaoui | def. | (South Korea) A Sol Kwon (c) | Submission (rear naked choke) | 1/3 | 3:44 | (Note: Road FC $1 Million Lightweight (Championship) Tournament finals) |
| Openweight | (China) Aorigele | def. | (South Korea) Jae Hyuk Heo | KO (punch) | 1/3 | 0:50 |
| Lightweight | (South Korea) Dong Guk Shin | def. | (Japan) Tamotsu Hayashi | TKO (punches) | 1/3 | 2:50 |
| -90 kg Catchweight | (South Korea) Tae In Kim | def. | (South Korea) Dong Hwan Lim | TKO (ground & pound) | 1/3 | 0:45 |
| Featherweight | (South Korea) Ji Ho Yang | def. | (South Korea) Hyung Geun Park | Decision (unanimous) | 2/2 | 5:00 |
Young guns 042
| Weight class | | | | Method | Round | Time | Notes |
| Bantamweight | (South Korea) Seok Han Park | def. | (Japan) Kenta Kubo | Submission (rear naked choke) | 2/2 | 4:25 |
| Flyweight | (South Korea) Gi Won Ko | def. | (South Korea) Chang Hwan Hwang | Decision (unanimous) | 2/2 | 5:00 |
| Welterweight | (South Korea) Tae Young Yoon | def. | (South Korea) Byung Ha Lim | TKO (punches) | 2/2 | 1:27 |
| Women's Bantamweight | (United States) Rowan Pilger | def. | (South Korea) Hee Jo Yang | Decision (unanimous) | 2/2 | 5:00 |
| -68 kg Catchweight | (South Korea) Ji Seung Shin | def. | (South Korea) Young Min Ji | Decision (unanimous) | 2/2 | 5:00 |

== Road FC 052 ==
Road FC 052

Information
- Promotion: Road Fighting Championship
- Date: February 23, 2019
- Venue: Jangchung Gymnasium
- City: (South Korea) Seoul

Event chronology
| Road FC 051 XX | Road FC 052 | Road FC 053 |

Goobne mall Road FC 052 was a mixed martial arts MMA event held by Road FC on February 23, 2019, at the Jangchung Gymnasium in Seoul, South Korea.

=== Background ===
The event featured the ROAD FC $1 Million Lightweight Tournament finals between Shamil Zavurov and Mansour Barnaoui to earn a shot at reigning lightweight champion A-Sol Kwon and the US$1 million prize.

=== Fight card ===
Main card
| Weight class | | | | Method | Round | Time | Notes |
|---|---|---|---|---|---|---|---|
| -70.0 kg Lightweight | (France) Mansour Barnaoui | def. | (Russia) Shamil Zavurov | KO (flying knee) | 3/3 | 0:30 | (Note: Road FC $1 Million Lightweight Tournament final) |
| -61.5 kg Bantamweight | (South Korea) Min Woo Kim | def. | (South Korea) Je Hoon Moon | Submission (triangle choke) | 1/3 | 2:15 | (Note: For the vacant Road FC Bantamweight Championship) |
| -70.0 kg Lightweight | (Brazil) Bruno Miranda | def. | (South Korea) Young Gi Hong | TKO (puches) | 1/3 | 2:45 |
| -61.5 kg Bantamweight | (South Korea) Ik Hwan Jang | def. | (South Korea) Dae Young Jang | Decision (unanimous) | 3/3 | 5:00 |
| -80.0 kg Catchweight | (South Korea) Seung Yeon Kim | def. | (South Korea) No Joo Gi | KO (punch) | 1/3 | 0:07 |
| Openweight | (Brazil) Michel Pereira | def. | (South Korea) Dae Sung Kim | TKO (knee) | 2/3 | 1:02 |
Young guns 041
| Weight class | | | | Method | Round | Time | Notes |
| -80.0 kg Middleweight | (South Korea) Hae Jun Yang | def. | (South Korea) Dong Hwan Lim | Submission (scarf hold armlock) | 1/2 | 2:40 |
| -64.0 kg Catchweight | (South Korea) Sang Jin Jung | def. | (South Korea) Seung Min Shin | TKO (knee) | 2/2 | 1:15 |
| -65.5 kg Featherweight | (South Korea) Tae Sung Kim | def. | (South Korea) Jung Gi Hong | TKO (kick) | 2/2 | 3:52 |
| -61.5 kg Bantamweight | (South Korea) Chang Hwan Hwang | def. | (South Korea) Sung Soo Lee | TKO (puches) | 2/2 | 3:56 |
| -60.0 kg Catchweight | (South Korea) Soo Wan Park | def. | (South Korea) Jung Hyun Lee | Decision (split) | 2/2 | 5:00 |

== See also ==
- List of Road FC events
- List of Road FC champions
- List of current Road FC fighters
- List of current mixed martial arts champions
