= 2020 in Road FC =

Mixed martial arts events

Information
- Promotion: Road Fighting Championship
- First date: May 23, 2020

Events

Fights

Chronology
2019 in Road FC	2020 in Road FC	2021 in Road FC

The year 2020 was the 11th year in the history of the Road Fighting Championship, a mixed martial arts promotion based in South Korea. 2020 starts with ARC 001.

== List of events ==
List of events in 2020
#	Event title	Main event	Date	Arena	Location
3	ARC 003	Park vs. Oh	October 17, 2020	Hot6ix Afreeca Colosseum, Lotte World Tower	(South Korea) Seoul
2	ARC 002	Nandin-Erdene vs. Kim	July 18, 2020	Hot6ix Afreeca Colosseum, Lotte World Tower	(South Korea) Seoul
1	ARC 001	Heo vs. Bae	May 23, 2020	Hot6ix Afreeca Colosseum, Lotte World Tower	(South Korea) Seoul

== Title fights ==
Title fights in 2020
#	Weight Class	Method	Round	Time	Event	Notes

== ARC 003 ==
ARC 003

Information
- Promotion: Road Fighting Championship
- Date: October 17, 2020
- Venue: Hot6ix Afreeca Colosseum
- City: (South Korea) Seoul

Event chronology
ARC 002	ARC 003	ARC 004

AfreecaTV ROAD Championship ARC 003 is a mixed martial arts event scheduled to be held by Road FC on August 29, 2020, at the Hot6ix Afreeca Colosseum, Lotte World Tower in Seoul, South Korea.

=== Fight card ===
Main card
Weight class				Method	Round	Time	Notes
-93.0 kg Catchweight	(South Korea) Jung Kyo Park	vs.	(South Korea) Il Hak Oh
Openweight	(South Korea) Dong Hyun Bae	vs.	(South Korea) Gi Hoon Ryu
-72.0 kg Catchweight	(South Korea) Chan Soo Park	vs.	(South Korea) Si Won Park
-65.5 kg Featherweight	(South Korea) Ji Yong Yang	vs.	(South Korea) Ji Ho Yang
-65.5 kg Featherweight	(South Korea) Yong Geun Kim	vs.	(South Korea) Jae Sung Parkh
Women's -52 kg Strawweight	(South Korea) Yoo Jin Shin	vs.	(South Korea) Yoo Jung Kim
-90.0 kg Catchweight	(South Korea) No Joo Gi	vs.	(South Korea) Seung Ho Jung
-61.5 kg Bantamweight	(South Korea) Yoon Joon Kim	vs.	(South Korea) Shin Hee Min

== ARC 002 ==
ARC 002

Information
- Promotion: Road Fighting Championship
- Date: July 18, 2020
- Venue: Hot6ix Afreeca Colosseum
- City: (South Korea) Seoul

Event chronology
ARC 001	ARC 002	ARC 003

AfreecaTV ROAD Championship ARC 002 is a mixed martial arts event scheduled to be held by Road FC on July 18, 2020, at the Hot6ix Afreeca Colosseum, Lotte World Tower in Seoul, South Korea.

=== Fight card ===
Main card
Weight class				Method	Round	Time	Notes
-75.0 kg Catchweight	(Mongolia) Nandin-Erdene	def.	(South Korea) Se Young Kim	TKO (Punches)	2	1:54
-77.0 kg Lightweight	(Kyrgyzstan) Shoiatbek Bazarbaev	def.	(South Korea) Dong Guk Shin	Decision (Split)	3	3:00
-75.0 kg Catchweight	(South Korea) Chan Soo Park	def.	(South Korea) Kyung Yui Cho	Decision (Unanimous)	3	3:00
-61.5 kg Bantamweight	(South Korea) Jung Hyun Lee	def.	(South Korea) Jae Nam Yoo	Decision (Unanimous)	3	3:00
-61.5 kg Bantamweight	(South Korea) Sergei Choi	def.	(South Korea) Chang Hwan Hwang	TKO (Punches)	1	0:47
-77.0 kg Lightweight	(South Korea) Si Won Park	def.	(Mongolia) Chingun Shinkoiwa	Submission (Rear Naked Choke)	2	2:17
Women's -53.0 kg Catchweight	(South Korea) Yoo Jin Shin	def.	(South Korea) Ji Soo Park	TKO (Punches)	1	2:20
-68.0 kg Catchweight	(South Korea) Ji Yong Yang	def.	(South Korea) Yi Sak Kim	Decision (Unanimous)	3	3:00

== ARC 001 ==
ARC 001

Information
- Promotion: Road Fighting Championship
- Date: May 23, 2020
- Venue: Hot6ix Afreeca Colosseum
- City: (South Korea) Seoul

Event chronology
Road FC 057 XX	ARC 001	ARC 002

AfreecaTV ROAD Championship ARC 001 is a mixed martial arts event scheduled to be held by Road FC on May 23, 2020, at the Hot6ix Afreeca Colosseum, Lotte World Tower in Seoul, South Korea.

=== Fight card ===
Main card
Weight class				Method	Round	Time	Notes
Openweight	(South Korea) Dong Hyun Bae	def.	(South Korea) Jae hyuk Heo	TKO (Punches)	3	1:03
-75.0 kg Catchweight	(Mongolia) Nandin Erdene	def.	(South Korea) Se Young Kim	TKO (Punches)	1	0:40
-70.0 kg Lightweight	(South Korea) Seung Mo Park	def.	(South Korea) Sung Soo Lee	Decision (Split)	3	3:00
-80.0 kg Bantamweight	(South Korea) Yoon Seo Shin	def.	(South Korea) San Kim	Decision (Unanimous)	3	3:00
-61.5 kg Bantamweight	(South Korea) Young Min Ji	def.	(South Korea) Yoon Joong Kim	Decision (Unanimous)	3	3:00
-61.5 kg Bantamweight	(South Korea) Jung Hyun Lee	def.	(South Korea) Dong Hyuk Ko	TKO (Punches)	3	3:00
-70.0 kg Lightweight	(South Korea) Si Won Park	def.	(South Korea) Kyung Min Min	Submission (Rear-naked Choke)	3	2:15
Women's -57.0 kg Flyweight	(South Korea) Eun Jung Lee	def.	(South Korea) Hyun Joo Baek	Decision (Split)	3	3:00
-61.5 kg Bantamweight	(Uzbekistan) Davron Kholmatov	def.	(South Korea) Seung Hyuk Hong	TKO (Punches)	1	1:20
-61.5 kg Bantamweight	(South Korea) Shin Hee Min	def.	(South Korea) Ha Jun Kim	TKO (Flying Knee & Punches)	1	2:55

== See also ==
- List of Road FC events
- List of Road FC champions
- List of current Road FC fighters
- List of current mixed martial arts champions
