= 2023 in Road FC =

Mixed martial arts events

Road Fighting Championship

Information
- First date: February 25, 2023
- Last date: December 16, 2023

Events
- Total events: 5

Fights

Chronology
| 2022 in Road FC | Road Fighting Championship | 2024 in Road FC |

The year 2023 is the 14th year in the history of the Road Fighting Championship, a mixed martial arts promotion based in South Korea. 2023 starts with ROAD FC 63.

== List of events ==
List of events in 2023
| # | Event title | Main event | Date | Arena | Location |
|---|---|---|---|---|---|
| 1 | ROAD FC 63 | Hwang vs. Myung | February 25, 2023 | Goyang Gymnasium | Goyang, South Korea |
| 2 | ROAD FC 64 | Kim vs. Indenko | June 24, 2023 | Wonju Gymnasium | Wonju, South Korea |
| 3 | ROAD FC 65 | Kim vs. Azevedo | August 26, 2023 | Anyang Gymnasium | Anyang, South Korea |
| 4 | ROAD FC 66 | Kim vs. Haraguchi | October 29, 2023 | Chiak Gymnasium | Wonju, South Korea |
| 5 | ROAD FC 67 | Heo vs. Sekino | December 16, 2023 | Swiss Grand Hotel | Seoul, South Korea |

== 2023 Grands Prix ==
Road FC President Jung Mun-hong recently revealed that the promotion will run Grand Prix across lightweight (70kg) and bantamweight (63kg) classes, The quarter-finals start on June 24 at Road FC 64, the semi-finals will take place in August and the finals in October. The winning prize is expected to be between 100 million South Korean won and 300 million South Korean won.

=== 2023 Road FC Lightweight Grand Prix ===
Quarter-finals
(South Korea) Han Sang-kwon | 1r.
(Cameroon) Max Sugimoto | DQ
(South Korea) Yoon Tae-young | 1r.
(Russia) Artur Soloviev | TKO
(Mongolia) Nandin-Erdene Munguntsooj | TKO
(Brazil) Filipe Jesus | 1r.
(South Korea) Park Hae-jin | 3r.
(Japan) Shutaro Debano | UD

Semi-finals
(Cameroon) Max Sugimoto | 1r.
(Russia) Artur Soloviev | TKO
(Mongolia) Nandin-Erdene Munguntsooj | TKO
(Japan) Shutaro Debano | 1r.

Final
(Russia) Artur Soloviev | KO
(Mongolia) Nandin-Erdene Munguntsooj | 1r.

=== 2023 Road FC Bantamweight Grand Prix ===
Quarter-finals
(South Korea) Kim Soo-chul | SUB
(Russia) Aleksey Indenko | 1r.
(South Korea) Park Hyung-geun | 3r.
(Brazil) Bruno Azevedo | SUB
(South Korea) Moon Je-hoon | 3r.
(Japan) Akira Haraguchi | UD
(South Korea) Yang Ji-yong | 1r.
(Kyrgyzstan) Razhab Shaydullaev | SUB

Semi-finals
(South Korea) Kim Soo-chul | UD
(Brazil) Bruno Azevedo | 3r.
(Japan) Akira Haraguchi | DQ
(Kyrgyzstan) Razhab Shaydullaev* | –

Final
(South Korea) Kim Soo-chul | UD
(Japan) Akira Haraguchi | 2r.

*Razhab Shaydullaev was disqualified after missing the weight limit in the semi-finals.

== Road FC 63 ==
Road FC 63

Information
- Promotion: Road Fighting Championship
- Date: February 25, 2023
- Venue: Goyang Gymnasium
- City: Goyang, South Korea

Road FC 63 was a mixed martial arts event scheduled to be held by Road FC on February 25, 2023, at the Goyang Gymnasium in Goyang, South Korea.

=== Background ===
An openweight kickboxing bout between Hwang In-su and Myung Hyun-man was booked as the event headliner.

=== Results ===
Road FC 63
| Weight Class | | | | Method | Round | Time | Notes |
|---|---|---|---|---|---|---|---|
| Openweight | (South Korea) Hwang In-su | def. | (South Korea) Myung Hyun-man | TKO (Retirement) | 3 | 0:48 | Kickboxing rules |
| Bantamweight 63 kg | (South Korea) Yang Ji-yong | def. | (Japan) Koki Hirasawa | KO (Punch) | 1 | 1:47 | |
| Openweight | (South Korea) Shim Gun-oh | def. | (Mongolia) Tserendash Azjargal | Disqualification (Groin Kick) | 2 | 0:12 | |
| Lightweight 70 kg | (South Korea) Wi Jeong-won | def. | (South Korea) Lee Jae-won | TKO (Retirement) | 1 | 5:00 | |
| Heavyweight 120 kg | (Japan) Taisei Sekino | def. | (South Korea) Bae Dong-hyun | TKO (Punches) | 1 | 4:11 | |
Part 1
| Middleweight 84 kg | (South Korea) Lim Dong-hwan | def. | (South Korea) Jung Ho-yeon | TKO (Punches) | 1 | 2:28 | |
| Middleweight 84 kg | (South Korea) Jung Seung-ho | def. | (South Korea) Ko Kyung-jin | TKO (Punches) | 1 | 2:53 | |
| Bantamweight 63 kg | (South Korea) Hong Tae-sun | def. | (South Korea) Han Ji-hoon | Submission (Rear-Naked Choke) | 2 | 2:51 | |
| Bantamweight 63 kg | (South Korea) Lee Jung-hyun | def. | (South Korea) Jang Jin-pyo | Decision (Unanimous) | 2 | 5:00 | |
| Bantamweight 63 kg | (South Korea) Kim Jun-seok | def. | (South Korea) Cha Min-hyuk | Decision (Unanimous) | 2 | 5:00 | |

== Road FC 64 ==
Road FC 64

Information
- Promotion: Road Fighting Championship
- Date: June 24, 2023
- Venue: Wonju Gymnasium
- City: Wonju, South Korea

Road FC 64 was a mixed martial arts event scheduled to be held by Road FC on June 24, 2023, at the Wonju Gymnasium in Wonju, South Korea.

=== Background ===
A quarter-final bout for 2023 Road FC Bantamweight Grand Prix between former ONE Bantamweight World Champion Kim Soo-chul and Alexey Indenko was booked as the event headliner.

=== Fight card ===
Road FC 64
| Weight Class | | | | Method | Round | Time | Notes |
|---|---|---|---|---|---|---|---|
| Bantamweight 63 kg | (South Korea) Kim Soo-chul | def. | (Russia) Alexey Indenko | Submission (Guillotine Choke) | 1 | 0:55 | 2023 Road FC Bantamweight Grand Prix Quarter-Final bout |
| Bantamweight 63 kg | (Japan) Akira Haraguchi | def. | (South Korea) Moon Je-hoon | Decision (Unanimous) | 3 | 5:00 | 2023 Road FC Bantamweight Grand Prix Quarter-Final bout |
| Lightweight 70 kg | (Mongolia) Nandin Erdene | def. | (Brazil) Filipe Jesus | TKO (Punches) | 1 | 1:43 | 2023 Road FC Lightweight Grand Prix Quarter-Final bout |
| Bantamweight 63 kg | (Kyrgyzstan) Razhab Shaydullaev | def. | (South Korea) Yang Ji-yong | Submission (Rear-Naked Choke) | 1 | 4:00 | 2023 Road FC Bantamweight Grand Prix Quarter-Final bout |
| Lightweight 70 kg | (Japan) Shutaro Debano | def. | (South Korea) Park Hae-jin | Decision (Unanimous) | 3 | 5:00 | 2023 Road FC Lightweight Grand Prix Quarter-Final bout |
| Lightweight 70 kg | (Russia) Artur Soloviev | def. | (South Korea) Yoon Tae-young | KO (Punch) | 1 | 4:15 | 2023 Road FC Lightweight Grand Prix Quarter-Final bout |
| Bantamweight 63 kg | (Brazil) Bruno Azevedo | def. | (South Korea) Park Hyung-geun | Submission (Rear-Naked Choke) | 3 | 1:28 | 2023 Road FC Bantamweight Grand Prix Quarter-Final bout |
Part 1
| Lightweight 70 kg | (Cameroon) Max Sugimoto | def. | (South Korea) Han Sang-kwon | Disqualification (Illegal Knee) | 1 | 2:58 | 2023 Road FC Lightweight Grand Prix Quarter-Final bout |
| Bantamweight 63 kg | (Mongolia) Baatarchuluun Gantogtokh | def. | (South Korea) Cha Min-hyuk | KO (Punch) | 1 | 3:42 | 2023 Road FC Bantamweight Grand Prix Quarter-Final Reserve bout |
| Lightweight 70 kg | (South Korea) Shin Dong-Guk | def. | (South Korea) Yeo Je-woo | TKO (Punches) | 2 | 2:51 | 2023 Road FC Lightweight Grand Prix Quarter-Final Reserve bout |
| Women's Catchweight 49 kg | (South Korea) Park Seo-young | def. | (South Korea) Baek Hyeon-ju | Decision (Unanimous) | 2 | 5:00 | |
| Lightweight 70 kg | (South Korea) Kim Min-hyung | def. | (South Korea) Park Hyeon-bin | Submission (Rear-Naked Choke) | 1 | 3:22 | |

== Road FC 65 ==
Road FC 65

Information
- Promotion: Road Fighting Championship
- Date: August 26, 2023
- Venue: Anyang Gymnasium
- City: Anyang, South Korea

Road FC 65 was a mixed martial arts event scheduled to be held by Road FC on August 26, 2023, at the Anyang Gymnasium in Anyang, South Korea.

=== Background ===
A semi-final bout for 2023 Road FC Bantamweight Grand Prix between former ONE Bantamweight World Champion Kim Soo-chul and Bruno Azevedo was booked as the event headliner.

=== Fight card ===
Road FC 65
| Weight Class | | | | Method | Round | Time | Notes |
|---|---|---|---|---|---|---|---|
| Bantamweight 63 kg | (South Korea) Kim Soo-chul | def. | (Brazil) Bruno Azevedo | Decision (unanimous) | 3 | 5:00 | 2023 Road FC Bantamweight Grand Prix Semi-Final bout |
| Bantamweight 63 kg | (South Korea) Yang Ji-yong | def. | (South Korea) Moon Je-hoon | Decision (split) | 3 | 5:00 | Moon retirement match. |
| Lightweight 70 kg | (Mongolia) Nandin Erdene | def. | (Japan) Shutaro Debano | TKO (punches) | 1 | 4:33 | 2023 Road FC Lightweight Grand Prix Semi-Final bout |
| Lightweight 70 kg | (Russia) Artur Soloviev | def. | (Cameroon) Max Sugimoto | TKO (punches) | 1 | 1:53 | 2023 Road FC Lightweight Grand Prix Semi-Final bout |
| Lightweight 70 kg | (South Korea) Shin Dong-guk | def. | (South Korea) Han Sang-kwon | KO (punches) | 1 | 4:05 | 2023 Road FC Lightweight Grand Prix Semi-Final Reserve bout |
Part 1
| Openweight | (Japan) Taisei Sekino | def. | (South Korea) Oh Il-hak | TKO (punches) | 2 | 2:35 | |
| Catchweight 87 kg | (South Korea) Jung Seung-ho | def. | (South Korea) Kim Young-hoon | KO (front kick and punches) | 2 | 4:59 | |
| Bantamweight 63 kg | (South Korea) Han Yoon-soo | def. | (South Korea) Son Jae-min | KO (punch) | 2 | 1:50 | |
| Flyweight 57 kg | (South Korea) Jung Jae-bok | def. | (South Korea) Jang Chan-woo | Submission (heel hook) | 1 | 2:12 | |
| Catchweight 66 kg | (South Korea) Lee Sin-woo | def. | (South Korea) Lee Sun-joo | Decision (unanimous) | 2 | 5:00 | |
| Lightweight 70 kg | (South Korea) Han Woo-young | def. | (South Korea) Kwon Min-woo | KO (punches) | 1 | 2:02 | |

== Road FC 66 ==
Road FC 66

Information
- Promotion: Road Fighting Championship
- Date: October 29, 2023
- Venue: Chiak Gymnasium
- City: Wonju, South Korea

Road FC 66 was a mixed martial arts event scheduled to be held by Road FC on October 29, 2023, at the Chiak Gymnasium in Wonju, South Korea.

=== Fight card ===
Road FC 66
| Weight Class | | | | Method | Round | Time | Notes |
|---|---|---|---|---|---|---|---|
| Bantamweight 63 kg | (South Korea) Kim Soo-chul | def. | (Japan) Akira Haraguchi | KO (punches) | 2 | 4:25 | 2023 Road FC Bantamweight Grand Prix Final bout |
| Lightweight 70 kg | (Russia) Artur Soloviev | def. | (Mongolia) Nandin Erdene | KO (punches) | 1 | 1:32 | 2023 Road FC Lightweight Grand Prix Final bout |
| Bantamweight 63 kg | (South Korea) Yang Ji-yong | def. | (Japan) Kento Takahashi | Decision (unanimous) | 3 | 5:00 | |
| Openweight | (South Korea) Kim Myung-hwan | def. | (South Korea) Shim Gun-oh | KO (punches) | 1 | 4:18 | |
Part 1
| Bantamweight 63 kg | (South Korea) Yoo Jae-nam | def. | (South Korea) Han Yoon-soo | Decision (unanimous) | 2 | 5:00 | |
| Lightweight 70 kg | (South Korea) Kim San | def. | (South Korea) Kim Min-hyung | Submission (triangle choke) | 2 | 1:27 | |
| Bantamweight 63 kg | (South Korea) Park Jae-seong | def. | (South Korea) Cha Min-hyuk | TKO (punches) | 2 | 2:11 | |
| Bantamweight 63 kg | (South Korea) Han Min-hyoung | def. | (South Korea) Kim Jun-seok | Decision (split) | 2 | 5:00 | |
| Flyweight 57 kg | (South Korea) Ko Dong-hyeok | def. | (South Korea) Choi Young-chan | Submission (rear-naked choke) | 1 | 2:48 | |
| Catchweight 66 kg | (South Korea) Choi Eun-seok | def. | (South Korea) Lee Seon-ju | Decision (unanimous) | 2 | 5:00 | |

== Road FC 67 ==
Road FC 67

Information
- Promotion: Road Fighting Championship
- Date: December 16, 2023
- Venue: Swiss Grand Hotel
- City: Seoul, South Korea

Road FC 67 will be a mixed martial arts event scheduled to be held by Road FC on December 16, 2023, at the Swiss Grand Hotel in Seoul, South Korea.

=== Fight card ===
Road FC 67
| Weight Class | | | | Method | Round | Time | Notes |
|---|---|---|---|---|---|---|---|
| Openweight | (Japan) Taisei Sekino | def. | (South Korea) Heo Jae-hyeok | TKO (punches) | 1 | 0:58 | |
| Bantamweight 63 kg | (South Korea) Yang Ji-yong | def. | (South Korea) Park Jae-seong | KO (punches) | 1 | 0:08 | |
| Flyweight 57 kg | (South Korea) Lee Jung-hyun | def. | (South Korea) Lee Gil-soo | KO (head kick) | 1 | 4:40 | |
| Catchweight 64 kg | (South Korea) Ko Dong-hyuk | def. | (South Korea) Choi Sergei | Submission (rear-naked choke) | 3 | 2=27 | |
| Women's Catchweight 58 kg | (South Korea) Lee Su-yeon | def. | (South Korea) Lee Eun-jung | Decision (unanimous) | 2 | 5:00 | |
| Lightweight 70 kg | (South Korea) Kim San | def. | (South Korea) Shin Dong-guk | Decision (unanimous) | 3 | 5:00 | |

== See also ==
- List of Road FC events
- List of Road FC champions
- List of current Road FC fighters
- List of current mixed martial arts champions
- 2023 in UFC
- 2023 in Bellator MMA
- 2023 in ONE Championship
- 2023 in Absolute Championship Akhmat
- 2023 in Konfrontacja Sztuk Walki
- 2023 in Rizin Fighting Federation
- 2023 in Brave Combat Federation
- 2023 in Legacy Fighting Alliance
