= 2021 in Road FC =

Mixed martial arts events

Information
- Promotion: Road Fighting Championship
- First date: March 27, 2021

Events

Fights

Chronology
2020 in Road FC	2021 in Road FC	2022 in Road FC

The year 2021 was the 12th year in the history of the Road Fighting Championship, a mixed martial arts promotion based in South Korea. 2021 starts with ARC 004.

== Road FC 2021 Awards ==
The following fighters won the Road FC year-end awards for 2021:

- Road FC Fighter of the Year 2021: In Soo Hwang
- Road FC Submission of the Year 2021: Hae Jin Park against Soo Chul Kim (ROAD FC 59)
- Road FC Knockout of the Year 2021: Park Seung-Mo against Nandin-Erdene Munguntsooj and Shin Dong-Guk ( ARC 4 and ROAD FC 59)
- Road FC Rookie of the Year 2021: Jung Hyun Lee and Hyun Woo Kim

== List of events ==
List of events in 2021
#	Event title	Main event	Date	Arena	Location
1	ARC 4	Oh vs. Park	March 27, 2021	Lotte World Afreeca Colosseum, Lotte World Tower	Seoul, South Korea
2	ARC 5	Lee vs. Su	June 12, 2021	Lotte World Afreeca Colosseum, Lotte World Tower	Seoul, South Korea
3	ROAD FC 58	Hwang vs. Oh	July 3, 2021	Changwon Gymnasium	Changwon, South Korea
4	ROAD FC 59	Kim vs. Kim	September 4, 2021	Wonju Gymnasium	Wonju, South Korea
5	ARC 6	Lee vs. Choi	October 30, 2021	Lotte World Afreeca Colosseum, Lotte World Tower	Seoul, South Korea

== ARC 4 ==
ARC 003

Information
- Promotion: Road Fighting Championship
- Date: March 27, 2021
- Venue: Lotte World Afreeca Colosseum
- City: Seoul, South Korea

Event chronology
ARC 002	ARC 003	ROAD FC 58

AfreecaTV ROAD Championship ARC 4 was a mixed martial arts event scheduled to be held by Road FC on March 27, 2021, at the Lotte World Afreeca Colosseum, Lotte World Tower in Seoul, South Korea.

=== Background ===
The main event featured rising heavyweight prospect Il Hak Oh fighting Jung Kyo Park.

=== Results ===
ARC 4
Weight Class				Method	Round	Time	Notes
Catchweight 95 kg	(South Korea) Jung Kyo Park	def.	(South Korea) Il Hak Oh	Submission (Guillotine Choke)	3	1:23	
Catchweight 75 kg	(South Korea) Seung Mo Park	def.	(Mongolia) Nandin-Erdene Munguntsooj	TKO (Punches)	1	0:28	
Catchweight 60 kg	(South Korea) Jung Hyun Lee	def.	(South Korea) Jin Woo Park	KO (Punch)	2	1:06	
Lightweight 70 kg	(South Korea) Doo Seok Oh	def.	(South Korea) Yoon Seo Shin	Decision (Unanimous)	3	3:00	
Welterweight 77 kg	(South Korea) Je Woo Yeo	def.	(South Korea) San Kim	Decision (Unanimous)	3	3:00	
Lightweight 70 kg	(South Korea) Ji Ho Yang	def.	(Mongolia) Chingun Shinkoiwa	Decision (Unanimous)	3	3:00	
Bantamweight 61 kg	(South Korea) Hyun Woo Kim	def.	(South Korea) Min Soo Cho	TKO (Punches)	2	0:49	
Featherweight 66 kg	(South Korea) Yoon Joong Kim	def.	(South Korea) Min Gyu Lee	Decision (Unanimous)	3	3:00	

== ARC 5 ==
ARC 5

Information
- Promotion: Road Fighting Championship
- Date: June 12, 2021
- Venue: Lotte World Afreeca Colosseum, Lotte World Tower
- City: Seoul, South Korea

Event chronology
ARC 004	ARC 5	ROAD FC 58

ARC 5 was a Combat sport event held by Road Fighting Championship on June 12, 2021, in Seoul, South Korea.

=== Background ===
Two undefeated lightweight prospects, Jung Hyun Lee and Jo Min Su were scheduled to fight in the main event.

In the co-main event, Jae Hyuk Heo was scheduled to fight Gi Hoon Ryu in an openweight bout.

=== Results ===
ARC 5
Weight Class				Method	Round	T.Time	Notes
Catchweight 60kg	(South Korea) Jung Hyun Lee	def.	(South Korea) Jo Min Su	Decision (Unanimous)	3	3:00	
Openweight	(South Korea) Gi Hoon Ryu	def.	(South Korea) Jae Hyuk Heo	KO (Punch)	1	1:39	
Featherweight 66kg	(South Korea) Young Hwan Kim	def.	(South Korea) Dong Hyun Bae	Decision (Unanimous)	1	5:00	Judo Bout
Featherweight 66kg	(South Korea) Hyun Woo Kim	def.	(South Korea) Young Min Ji	Decision (Unanimous)	3	3:00	
Lightweight 70kg	(South Korea) Ji Un Choi	def.	(South Korea) Kyung Bin Jang	TKO (Doctor Stoppage)	3	0:38	
Welterweight 77kg	(South Korea) Tae Young Yoon	def.	(South Korea) Sang Kwon Han	Submission (Guillotine choke)	1	0:45	
W.Strawweight 52kg	(South Korea) Yoo Jung Kim	def.	(South Korea) Hyeon Ju Baeg	Decision (Unanimous)	3	3:00	
Featherweight 66kg	(South Korea) Dong Hyuk Ko	def.	(South Korea) Jin Guk Kim	Decision (Unanimous)	3	3:00	

== ROAD FC 58 ==
ROAD FC 58

Information
- Promotion: Road Fighting Championship
- Date: July 3, 2021
- Venue: Changwon Gymnasium
- City: Changwon, South Korea

Event chronology
ARC 005	ROAD FC 58	ROAD FC 59

ROAD FC 58 was a Combat sport event held by Road Fighting Championship on July 3, 2021, in Changwon, South Korea.

=== Background ===
It was announced that In Soo Hwang and Il Hak Oh would fight for the vacant ROAD FC Middleweight title.

The event featured an openweight bout between the South Korean actor Geum Kwang San and Jae Hoon Kim.

One-time Road FC featherweight title challenger Hae Jin Park was scheduled to meet Doo Seok Oh in the event's featured bout.

Won Jun Choi was scheduled to face Dong Hwan Lim at middleweight.

Two undefeated lightweights, Si Won Park and Tae Sung Kim, were scheduled to fight at this event.

Three additional fights were announced on June 2: a flyweight bout between Seo Dong Soo and Kim Woo Jae, a bantamweight bout between Yang Ji Yong and Lee Jung Hyun, as well as a featherweight bout between Lee Seong Ju and Park Jin.

=== Results ===
ROAD FC 58
Weight Class				Method	Round	T.Time	Notes
Middleweight 84kg	(South Korea) In Soo Hwang	def.	(South Korea) Il Hak Oh	TKO (Punches)	2	0:34	For the vacant ROAD FC Middleweight title
Openweight	(South Korea) Jae Hoon Kim	def.	(South Korea) Geum Kwang San	TKO (Punches)	1	2:06	
Middleweight 84kg	(South Korea) Won Jun Choi	def.	(South Korea) Dong Hwan Lim	Submission (Shoulder Press)	1	3:01	
Featherweight 66kg	(South Korea) Hae Jin Park	def.	(South Korea) Doo Seok Oh	Submission (Kneebar)	1	0:59	
Lightweight 70kg	(South Korea) Si Won Park	def.	(South Korea) Tae Sung Kim	KO (Punch)	1	1:16	
Preliminary Card
Bantamweight 61kg	(South Korea) Yang Ji Yong	def.	(South Korea) Lee Jung Hyun	Decision (Unanimous)	2	5:00	
Featherweight 66kg	(South Korea) Park Jin	def.	(South Korea) Lee Seong Ju	Decision (Unanimous)	2	5:00	
Catchweight 60kg	(South Korea) Sergei Choi	def.	(South Korea) Young Han Kim	Decision (Unanimous)	2	5:00	
Flyweight 57kg	(South Korea) Kim Woo Jae	def.	(South Korea) Seo Dong Soo	TKO (Punches)	2	1:45	

== ROAD FC 59 ==
ROAD FC 59

Information
- Promotion: Road Fighting Championship
- Date: September 4, 2021
- Venue: Wonju Gymnasium
- City: Wonju, South Korea

Event chronology
ROAD FC 58	ROAD FC 59	ARC 6

ROAD FC 59 was a Combat sport event held by Road Fighting Championship on September 4, 2021, in Wonju, South Korea.

=== Background ===
A featherweight bout between Hae Jin Park and Soo Chul Kim for the vacant ROAD FC Featherweight title was scheduled as the event headliner.

A fight for the vacant ROAD FC Women's Atomweight title between Jeong Eun Park and Shin Yu-Ri was scheduled as the co-main event.

A lightweight bout between Park Seung-Mo and Shin Dong-Guk was expected to take place at this event.

The undefeated flyweights, Jung Hyun Lee and Davron Kholmatov, were scheduled to face each other.

Six-fight Road FC veteran Gi-Won Ko was scheduled to face the eight-fight veteran Dae-Yeong Jang in a bantamweight bout.

=== Results ===
ROAD FC 59
Weight Class				Method	Round	T.Time	Notes
Featherweight 66kg	(South Korea) Hae Jin Park	def.	(South Korea) Soo Chul Kim	Submission (Guillotine Choke)	1	4:50	For the vacant ROAD FC Featherweight title.
Women's Atomweight 48kg	(South Korea) Shim Yu-Ri	def.	(South Korea) Jeong Eun Park	Decision (Split)	3	5:00	For the vacant ROAD FC Women's Atomweight title.
Lightweight 70kg	(South Korea) Park Seung-Mo	def.	(South Korea) Shin Dong-Guk	TKO (Punches)	1	0:25	
Openweight	(South Korea) Bae Dong-Hyun	def.	(South Korea) Ryu Ki-Hoon	TKO (Punches)	1	2:50	
Flyweight 57kg	(South Korea) Jung Hyun Lee	def.	(South Korea) Young Han Kim	KO (Punches)	1	2:53	
Preliminary Card
Bantamweight 61kg	(South Korea) Gi-Won Ko	def.	(South Korea) Dae-Yeong Jang	KO (Punches)	1	0:24	
Catchweight 72kg	(South Korea) Yeo Je-Woo	def.	(Kyrgyzstan) Shoiatbek Bazarbaev	KO (Punch)	1	2:10	
Bantamweight 61kg	(South Korea) Yoo Jae-Nam	def.	(South Korea) Ko Dong-Hyeok	KO (Punch)	1	0:20	
Catchweight 63	(South Korea) Kim Hyun-Woo	def.	(South Korea) Park-Jae-Seong	TKO (Punches)	1	1:41	
W.Flyweight 57kg	(South Korea) Shin Yu-Jin	def.	(South Korea) Lee Eun-Jung	Submission (Rear-Naked Choke)	1	4:50	
Lightweight 70kg	(South Korea) Lee Min-Gyu	def.	(South Korea) Shin Yoon Seo	TKO (Head Kick and Punches)	1	4:19	
Catchweight 63kg	(South Korea) Park Min-Su	def.	(South Korea) Le Sin-Woo	TKO (Punches)	2	0:38	

== ARC 6 ==
ARC 6

Information
- Promotion: Road Fighting Championship
- Date: October 30, 2021
- Venue: Lotte World Afreeca Colosseum, Lotte World Tower
- City: Seoul, South Korea

Event chronology
ROAD FC 59	ARC 6	Arc 7

ARC 6 was a Combat sport event held by Road Fighting Championship on October 30, 2021, at the Lotte World Afreeca Colosseum, Lotte World Tower in Seoul, South Korea.

=== Background ===
The event was headlined by a 60kg catchweight bout between Jung Hyun Lee and Sergei Choi.

=== Results ===
ARC 6
Weight Class				Method	Round	T.Time	Notes
Catchweight 60kg	(South Korea) Jung Hyun Lee	def.	(South Korea) Sergei Choi	Decision (Unanimous)	3	3:00	
Catchweight 72kg	(South Korea) Kyung Bin Jang	def.	(South Korea) Ji Ho Yang	Decision (Unanimous)	3	3:00	
Catchweight 86kg	(South Korea) Tae Young Yoon	def.	(South Korea) Seung Ho Jung	Decision (Unanimous)	3	3:00	
Welterweight 77kg	(South Korea) San Kim	def.	(South Korea) Sang Kwon Han	Submission (Triangle Choke)	3	0:50	
W.Strawweight 52kg	(South Korea) Eun Jung Lee	def.	(South Korea) Seo Young Park	Decision (Unanimous)	3	3:00	
Bantamweight 61kg	(South Korea) Jin Woo Park	def.	(South Korea) Min Soo Cho	TKO (Punches)	2	2:00	
Catchweight 68kg	(South Korea) Min Soo Park	def.	(South Korea) Min Woo Kwon	Decision (Unanimous)	3	3:00	
Catchweight 69kg	(South Korea) Min Hyung Han	def.	(South Korea) Hyung Woo Yoo	TKO (Punches)	1	1:15	

== See also ==
- List of Road FC events
- List of Road FC champions
- List of current Road FC fighters
- List of current mixed martial arts champions
