= 2018 in Road FC =

Mixed martial arts events

Information
- Promotion: Road Fighting Championship
- First date: March 10, 2018

Events
- Total events: 6

Fights
- Total fights: 65
- Title fights: 3

Chronology
2017 in Road FC	2018 in Road FC	2019 in Road FC

The year 2018 was the 9th year in the history of the Road Fighting Championship, a mixed martial arts promotion based in South Korea. 2018 started with Road FC 046 and ended with Road FC 051 XX.

== List of events ==
#	Event Title	Main Event	Date	Arena	Location
6	Road FC 051 XX	Ham vs. Park	December 15, 2018	Convention Centre, Grand Hilton Seoul	(South Korea) Seoul
5	Road FC 050	Choi vs. Lee	November 3, 2018	Chungmu Gymnasium	(South Korea) Daejeon
4	Road FC 049: in Paradise	Lee vs. Mizuno	August 18, 2018	Grand Walkerhill Seoul	(South Korea) Seoul
3	Road FC 048	Choi vs. La	July 28, 2018	Wonju Gymnasium	(South Korea) Wonju
2	Road FC 047	Aorigele vs. Kim	May 12, 2018	Cadillac Arena	(China) Beijing
1	Road FC 046	Lee vs. Kim	March 10, 2018	Jangchung Gymnasium	(South Korea) Seoul

== Road FC 051 XX ==
Road FC 051 XX

Information
- Promotion: Road Fighting Championship
- Date: December 15, 2018
- Venue: Convention Centre, Grand Hilton Seoul
- City: (South Korea) Seoul

Event chronology
Road FC 050	Road FC 051 XX	Road FC 052

Xiaomi Road FC 051 XX was an MMA event held by Road FC on December 15, 2018 at the Convention Centre, Grand Hilton Seoul in Seoul, South Korea. The 3rd event 'Road FC 045 XX' of the all-female MMA league Road FC XX was held on the main card. The event streamed live on DAZN in the United States.

=== Fight card ===
Road FC 051 XX
Weight class				Method	Round	Time	Notes
Women's Atomweight	(South Korea) Seo Hee Ham (c)	def.	(South Korea) Jeong Eun Park	Decision (unanimous)	3	5:00	(Note: For the Road FC Women's Atomweight Championship)
Women's Atomweight	(South Korea) Soo Yeon Lee	def.	(South Korea) Ye Ji Lee	Decision (split)	2	5:00
Women's Atomweight	(South Korea) Yuri Shim	def.	(China) Ming Shi	TKO (knees)	2	4:08
Women's Openweight	(United States) Rowan Pilger	def.	(South Korea) Young Ji Kim	Decision (unanimous)	2	5:00
Women's Atomweight	(South Korea) Yoon Ha Hong	def.	(South Korea) Hyun Joo Baek	TKO (punches)	1	1:44
Road FC 051
Weight class				Method	Round	Time	Notes
Middleweight	(Brazil) Michel Pereira	def.	(South Korea) Won Jun Choi	KO (punch)	1	0:41
Bantamweight	(South Korea) Hyung Geun Park	def.	(South Korea) Seung Min Shin	Decision (unanimous)	2	5:00
-72 kg Catchweight	(Mongolia) M. Nandin-Erdene	def.	(South Korea) Je Woo Yeo	KO (punch)	1	2:42
Lightweight	(South Korea) Jung Hyuk Jang	vs.	(Czech Republic) Max Handanagič	Draw (unanimous)	2	5:00
Bantamweight	(South Korea) Tae In Kim	def.	(South Korea) Ji Hoon Kim	KO (punch)	2	0:50

== Road FC 050 ==
Road FC 050

Information
- Promotion: Road Fighting Championship
- Date: November 3, 2018
- Venue: Chungmu Gymnasium
- City: (South Korea) Daejeon

Event chronology
Road FC 049	Road FC 050	Road FC 051 XX

Xiaomi Road FC 050 was an MMA event held by Road FC on November 3, 2018 at the Chungmu Gymnasium in Daejeon, South Korea. The event streamed live on DAZN in the United States.

=== Fight card ===
Main card
Weight class				Method	Round	Time	Notes
Featherweight	(South Korea) Jung Young Lee	def.	(South Korea) Mu Gyeom Choi (c)	Decision (unanimous)	3	5:00	(Note: For the Road FC Featherweight Championship)
Openweight	(Japan) Kazuyuki Fujita	def.	(South Korea) Mu Bae Choi	TKO (punches)	1	1:55
Lightweight	(South Korea) Young Gi Hong	def.	(Japan) Koji Nakamura	Decision (unanimous)	3	5:00
Bantamweight	(South Korea) Jae Nam Yoo	def.	(South Korea) Yi Moon Han	Submission (guillotine choke)	2	4:51
-50 kg Catchweight	(South Korea) Yuri Shim	def.	(South Korea) So Hee Lim	Decision (unanimous)	2	5:00
Openweight	(South Korea) Gun Oh Shim	def.	(South Korea) Jae Hyuk Heo	Decision (unanimous)	1	0:23
Young Guns 040
Weight class				Method	Round	Time	Notes
Middleweight	(South Korea) Dong Hwan Lim	def.	(South Korea) Jung Kyo Park	Submission (standing guillotine choke)	2	2:41
Flyweight	(Japan) Yuki Ito	def.	(South Korea) Tae Kyun Kim	TKO (ground and pound)	1	4:58
Featherweight	(South Korea) Chan Soo Park	def.	(South Korea) Yong Geun Kim	Decision (unanimous)	2	5:00
Bantamweight	(South Korea) Sung Jae Kim	def.	(South Korea) Chang Hwan Hwang	TKO (ground and pound)	2	2:41
Flyweight	(South Korea) Gi Won Ko	def.	(South Korea) Young Han Kim	Decision (unanimous)	2	0:22
Flyweight	(South Korea) Woo Jae Kim	def.	(South Korea) Won Hee Jung	Decision (unanimous)	2	5:00

== Road FC 049: in Paradise ==
Road FC 049

Information
- Promotion: Road Fighting Championship
- Date: August 18, 2018
- Venue: Grand Walkerhill Seoul
- City: (South Korea) Seoul

Event chronology
Road FC 048	Road FC 049	Road FC 050

Xiaomi Road FC 049 in Paradise is an MMA event scheduled to be held by Road FC on August 18, 2018 at the Grand Walkerhill Seoul, Seoul

=== Fight card ===
Main card
Weight class				Method	Round	Time	Notes
Middleweight	(Japan) Tatsuya Mizuno	def.	(South Korea) Eun Soo Lee	Submission (rear naked choke)	1	2:32
Openweight	(South Korea) Mu Bae Choi	def.	(China) Anding Ma	TKO (ground & pound)	1	4:09
Openweight	(Japan) Kazuyuki Fujita	def.	(United States) Justin Morton	Submission (north-south choke)	2	1:19
Women's Strawweight	(China) Ming Shi	def.	(Japan) Shiho Harada	Decision (split)	2	5:00
Featherweight	(South Korea) Hae Jin Park	def.	(Russia) Evgeniy Ryazanov	Submission (rear naked choke)	1	2:23
Lightweight	(China) Zhenyue Huang	def.	(Thailand) Thirayut Khaorat	KO (punch)	1	0:51

== Road FC 048 ==
Road FC 048

Information
- Promotion: Road Fighting Championship
- Date: July 28, 2018
- Venue: Wonju Gymnasium
- City: (South Korea) Wonju, Gangwon-do

Event chronology
Road FC 047	Road FC 048	Road FC 049

Xiaomi Road FC 048 was an MMA event held by Road FC on July 28, 2018 at the Jangchung Gymnasium in Seoul, South Korea.

=== Fight card ===
Main card
Weight class				Method	Round	Time	Notes
Middleweight	(South Korea) In Jae La	def.	(South Korea) Young Choi (c)	Decision (unanimous)	3	5:00	(Note: For the Road FC Middleweight Championship)
Middleweight	(Brazil) Michel Pereira	def.	(South Korea) Hae Jun Yang	TKO (knees & punches)	3	1:48
Women's Atomweight	(Japan) Mika Arai	def.	(South Korea) Ye Ji Lee	Decision (unanimous)	2	5:00
Middleweight	(South Korea) Won Jun Choi	def.	(South Korea) Uh Jin Jeon	Decision (unanimous)	3	5:00
Lightweight	(Japan) Tamotsu Hayashi	def.	(South Korea) Dong Guk Shin	Decision (technical)	2	3:27
Middleweight	(South Korea) Jong Hwan Lee	def.	(South Korea) Dae Sung Kim	Decision (unanimous)	3	5:00
Young Guns 039
Weight class				Method	Round	Time	Notes
Bantamweight	(South Korea) Yi Moon Han	def.	(South Korea) Jae Nam Yoo	Submission (toe hold)	2	2:50
Lightweight	(South Korea) Hyung Soo Kim	def.	(South Korea) Chang Guen Jeon	Decision (unanimous)	3	5:00
Flyweight	(South Korea) Soo Wan Park	def.	(South Korea) Jong Hyun Kwak	Decision (split)	2	5:00
Bantamweight	(Mongolia) Baasankhuu Damlanpurev	def.	(South Korea) Dong Hyuk Ko	Decision (majority)	2	5:00
Bantamweight	(Kyrgyzstan) B. Uulu Toichubaev	def.	(South Korea) Sang Jin Jung	Decision (unanimous)	2	5:00
Featherweight	(South Korea) Seung Min Baek	def.	(South Korea) Do Hyung Kwon	TKO (knees)	2	1:47
Bantamweight	(South Korea) Tae Young Ahn	def.	(South Korea) Jae Sung Park	Submission (triangle Choke)	1	1:34
Openweight	(South Korea) Ik Tae Jin	def.	(South Korea) Han Yong Lee	KO (punch)	1	4:50

== Road FC 047 ==
Road FC 047

Information
- Promotion: Road Fighting Championship
- Date: May 12, 2018
- Venue: Cadillac Arena
- City: (China) Beijing

Event chronology
Road FC 046	Road FC 047	Road FC 048

Xiaomi Road FC 047 was an MMA event held by Road FC on May 12, 2018 at the Cadillac Arena in Beijing, China.

=== Results ===
Part 2
Weight class				Method	Round	Time	Notes
Openweight	(China) Aorigele	def.	(South Korea) Jae Hun Kim	TKO (punches)	3	0:33	(Note: Road FC 2018 Openweight Grand Prix Opening Round)
Openweight	(Netherlands) Gilbert Yvel	def.	(United States) Mighty Mo	Technical Submission (armbar)	1	3:43	(Note: Road FC 2018 Openweight Grand Prix Opening Round)
Women's Openweight	(Brazil) Gabi Garcia	def.	(Russia) Veronika Futina	Submission (rear-naked choke)	1	3:49
Openweight	(England) Oli Thompson	def.	(China) Chaolong Deng	TKO (ground body knees)	2	3:49	(Note: Road FC 2018 Openweight Grand Prix Opening Round)
Openweight	(United States) Chris Barnett	def.	(Romania) Alexandru Lungu	TKO (ground & pounds)	1	2:34	(Note: Road FC 2018 Openweight Grand Prix Opening Round)
Part 1
Weight class				Method	Round	Time	Notes
Openweight	(Japan) Kazuyuki Fujita	def.	(China) Handong Kong	TKO (retirement)	2	4:46	(Note: Reserve Bout for Road FC 2018 Openweight Grand Prix)
-62.5 kg Catchweight	(China) Alateng Heili	def.	(South Korea) Jong Hyun Kwak	TKO (punches)	2	2:40
-72 kg Catchweight	(China) Yincang Bao	def.	(Japan) Shinji Sasaki	Decision (unanimous)	3	5:00
Women's Bantamweight	(China) Yingchao Jing	def.	(Japan) Marina Kumagai	Decision (unanimous)	2	5:00
Lightweight	(South Korea) Won Bin Ki	def.	(Thailand) Thirayut Khaorat	Decision (unanimous)	3	5:00
-72 kg Catchweight	(Brazil) Bruno Miranda	def.	(China) Baoshe Riguleng	Decision (unanimous)	3	5:00

== Road FC 046 ==
Road FC 046

Information
- Promotion: Road Fighting Championship
- Date: March 10, 2018
- Venue: Jangchung Gymnasium
- City: (South Korea) Seoul

Event chronology
Road FC 045 x Road FC XX	Road FC 046	Road FC 047

Xiaomi Road FC 046 was an MMA event held by Road FC on March 10, 2018 at the Jangchung Gymnasium in Seoul, South Korea.

=== Results ===
Part 2
Weight class				Method	Round	Time	Notes
Featherweight	(South Korea) Jung Young Lee	def.	(South Korea) Se Young Kim	TKO (punches)	1	3:30	(Note: Road FC Featherweight Contenders Bout)
Lightweight	(France) Mansour Barnaoui	def.	(Japan) Kota Shimoishi	Submission (rear naked choke)	3	1:47	(Note: Road FC $1 Million Lightweight Tournament Semi-finals)
Lightweight	(Russia) Shamil Zavurov	def.	(Brazil) Ronys Torres	Decision (unanimous)	3	5:00	(Note: Road FC $1 Million Lightweight Tournament Semi-finals)
-75 kg Catchweight	(South Korea) Young Gi Hong	def.	(South Korea) Tae Woong Eom	Submission (armbar)	2	4:54
Bantamweight	(South Korea) Hyung Geun Park	vs.	(South Korea) Jin Hyuk Moon	Draw (Split)	2	5:00
Openweight	(South Korea) Jae Hyuk Heo	def.	(South Korea) Jae Hoon Kim	TKO (ground & pound)	1	4:20
Bantamweight	(China) Alateng Heili	def.	(South Korea) Ik Hwan Jang	TKO (punches)	1	3:06
Part 1
Weight class				Method	Round	Time	Notes
Middleweight	(South Korea) In Soo Hwang	def.	(South Korea) Nae Chul Kim	TKO (punches)	1	0:50
Openweight	(China) Anding Ma	def.	(Japan) Junpei Hamada	Decision (unanimous)	3	5:00
Featherweight	(South Korea) Hae Jin Park	def.	(South Korea) Byeong Ok Cho	Decision (unanimous)	2	5:00
Lightweight	(South Korea) Kyeong Chil Min	def.	(China) Zhenyue Huang	Decision (unanimous)	2	5:00
Middleweight	(South Korea) In Jae La	def.	(South Korea) Dong Hwan Lim	Decision (unanimous)	2	5:00

== See also ==
- List of Road FC events
- List of Road FC champions
- List of current Road FC fighters
- List of current mixed martial arts champions
