= 2016–17 KBL season =

KBL League
- Season: 2016–17
- Dates: 14 October 2016 – 30 March 2017

The 2016–17 KBL season was the 21st season of the Korean Basketball League (KBL), the highest level of basketball in South Korea. Anyang KGC won its second KBL championship.

== Clubs ==
| Team | City | Arena | Capacity | Founded | Joined |
|---|---|---|---|---|---|
| Anyang KGC | Anyang | Anyang Gymnasium | 6,690 | 1992 | 1997 |
| Busan KT Sonicboom | Busan | Sajik Arena | 14,099 | 1997 | 1997 |
| Changwon LG Sakers | Changwon | Changwon Gymnasium | 6,000 | 1994 | 1997 |
| Goyang Orion Orions | Goyang | Goyang Gymnasium | 6,216 | 1995 | 1997 |
| Incheon Electroland Elephants | Incheon | Samsan World Gymnasium | 7,220 | 1994 | 1997 |
| Jeonju KCC Egis | Jeonju | Jeonju Gymnasium | 4,730 | 1977 | 1997 |
| Seoul Samsung Thunders | Seoul | Jamsil Arena | 11,069 | 1978 | 1997 |
| Seoul SK Knights | Seoul | Jamsil Students' Gymnasium | 6,229 | 1997 | 1997 |
| Ulsan Hyundai Mobis Phoebus | Ulsan | Dongchun Gymnasium | 5,831 | 1986 | 1997 |
| Wonju DB Promy | Wonju | Wonju Gymnasium | 4,600 | 1996 | 1997 |

== Regular season ==
| Pos | Team | Pld | W | L | Pts | Qualification |
|---|---|---|---|---|---|---|
| 1 | Anyang KGC | 54 | 39 | 15 | 0.722 | Qualification to Semi-Finals |
| 2 | Goyang Orion Orions | 54 | 36 | 18 | 0.667 | Qualification to Semi-Finals |
| 3 | Seoul Samsung Thunders | 54 | 34 | 20 | 0.630 | Qualification to Quarter-Finals |
| 4 | Ulsan Hyundai Mobis Phoebus | 54 | 28 | 26 | 0.519 | Qualification to Quarter-Finals |
| 5 | Wonju DB Promy | 54 | 26 | 28 | 0.481 | Qualification to Quarter-Finals |
| 6 | Incheon Electroland Elephants | 54 | 26 | 28 | 0.481 | Qualification to Quarter-Finals |
| 7 | Seoul SK Knights | 54 | 23 | 31 | 0.426 | |
| 8 | Changwon LG Sakers | 54 | 23 | 31 | 0.426 | |
| 9 | Busan KT Sonicboom | 54 | 18 | 36 | 0.333 | |
| 10 | Jeonju KCC Egis | 54 | 17 | 37 | 0.315 | |

== Playoffs ==
Quarter-finals
4 Ulsan Hyundai Mobis Phoebus | 3
5 Wonju DB Promy | 0
3 Seoul Samsung Thunders | 3
6 Incheon Electroland Elephants | 2

Semi-finals
1 Anyang KGC | 3
4 Ulsan Hyundai Mobis Phoebus | 0
2 Goyang Orion Orions | 2
3 Seoul Samsung Thunders | 3

Final
1 Anyang KGC | 4
3 Seoul Samsung Thunders | 2
