= Mansour Barnaoui =

Tunisian-French mixed martial arts fighter

- Born: منصور برناوي; September 20, 1992 (age 34); Tunis, Tunisia
- Other names: The Afro-Samurai
- Height: 6 ft 0 in (1.83 m)
- Weight: 155 lb (70 kg; 11 st 1 lb)
- Division: Lightweight
- Fighting out of: Paris, France
- Team: Team Magnum
- Years active: 2011–present

Mixed martial arts record
- Total: 29
- Wins: 22
- By knockout: 6
- By submission: 15
- By decision: 1
- Losses: 7
- By decision: 7

Other information
- Mixed martial arts record from Sherdog

Mansour Barnaoui (born September 20, 1992) is a Tunisian-French mixed martial artist who competes in the Lightweight division of PFL.

== Background ==
Residing nowadays in Malakoff, Hauts-de-Seine, Mansour was born in Tunis, Tunisia, immigrating to France as an infant, where he lived in difficult circumstances and sharing a small apartment with his three brothers and his mother. Faradji, friend and manager of Mansour, met Barnaoui when he lived in the same building as him and saw him staying around his home with friends, after they were unable to afford to register at the nearby wrestling room in Vanves. Faradji went to the town hall of Malakoff to ask for slots in a municipal hall, and after he was granted access, a few weeks later, the small band of Malakoff could finally train at the municipal gymnasium and the Magnum club was born. Aziz Mahi, Barnaoui's trainer in France, welcomed him to his gymnasium in the suburbs of Paris when he was only 14 years old. He quickly understood that he had the makings of a champion and went from grappling, to boxing, to pankration and then to train MMA

When he was younger, Barnaoui would skateboard and emulate Yamakasi parkour, earning the nickname Tarzan from the neighborhood grown-ups. Likewise, due to his immigration status, Mansour is not a French citizen due to the nature of his arrival to France. This means that all of his MMA contracts need to be signed outside of the country.

== Mixed martial arts career ==
=== Early career ===
A longtime product of Team Magnum MMA in Paris, France, the ‘Afro-Samurai’ got his start in the hybrid-MMA promotion 100% Fight, back before full-rules mixed martial arts had been legalized in the country. A 6-0 run early in his pro career was halted by a loss to future UFC top contender Kevin Lee during Instinct MMA 4 in Canada. After rebounding with a first round TKO stoppage at SHC 7, Cage Warriors approached Barnaoui and offered him a fight against Conor McGregor. The organizers were offering the fight between the two on the condition that Mansour signed a two-year contract with them. However, Mansour chose to instead sign with M-1 Global as the promotion was offering 10,000 and 15,000 euros per fight compared to the 2000 to 3000 euros at the Cage Warriors.

A few days before his first fight for M-1 on April 9, 2013 at M-1 Challenge 38, against future UFC champion Islam Makhachev, Mansour's father died. However, he decided to still fight and lost a hard-fought bout via unanimous decision.

Rebounding against Zulfikar Usmanov at M-1 Challenge 41, he submitted Usmanov via rear-naked choke in the third round. The Tunisian continued his momentum by winning a belt in another European organization, BAMMA, winning the BAMMA World Lightweight Championship and defending it against UFC vets Curt Warburton and Colin Fletcher.

Returning to M-1, Barnaoui won the M-1 Lightweight Championship against Maxim Divnich at M-1 Challenge 57, defeating Divnich via TKO stoppage after dropping him with a knee at the end of the first round and finishing him with ground and pound. Dropping down to Featherweight for the first and only time in his career for a chance for the M-1 Featherweight Championship against Ivan Buchinger at M-1 Challenge 62, Mansour lost the bout via unanimous decision.

=== Konfrontacja Sztuk Walki ===
On May 27, 2016, at KSW 35, he fought for the vacant KSW Lightweight Championship belt against future UFC fighter Mateusz Gamrot. He lost the bout via unanimous decision.

In his next bout for the promotion, Barnaoui faced Łukasz Chlewicki on December 3, 2016, at KSW 37. He won the bout via doctor stoppage in the first round.

=== Road FC ===
In the International Trials, he defeated Won Bin Ki at Road FC 038 by the way of first-round rear-naked choke, earning a spot in the Road Fighting Championship's 16-man Road FC $1 Million Dollar Lightweight Tournament.

In the opening round, Barnaoui faced Chang Hyun Kim at Road FC 040 on July 15, 2017, winning by the way of first round rear-naked choke. In the quarterfinals, he faced Nandin-Erdene Munguntsooj at Road FC 044 on November 11, 2017, where earned another submission victory via rear-naked choke, this time in the second round. In the semifinals, Barnanoui faced Kota Shimoishi at Road FC 046 on March 10, 2018, where he submitted Shimoishi with a rear-naked choke in the third round to earn his way into the tournament final. In the final at Road FC 052 on February 23, 2019, Barnaoui faced Khabib's cousin, Shamil Zavurov, knocking him out with a highlight flying knee in the third round.

On May 18, 2019, at Road FC 053. Barnaoui won the $1 million dollar prize and the Road FC Lightweight Championship against A Sol Kwon, submitting Kwon in the first round via rear-naked choke.

During the next three years in the pandemic, the snowboarding enthusiast escaped to the mountains whenever he could and due to the pandemic restrictions shutting down his base camp at the Jacques-Duclos gymnasium in Malakoff, he went to train in Dubai, one of the few accessible places with open rooms. He also trained in Thailand and spent six months in Las Vegas, at the 10th Planet and Xtreme Couture, where he was able to train against many talented fighters from the top promotions.

=== Bellator MMA ===
In June 2022, Barnaoui signed an exclusive multi-fight deal with Bellator MMA.

Barnaoui made his promotional debut headlining Bellator 287 on October 29, 2022, against Adam Piccolotti. He won the bout in a very dominant fashion, finishing Piccolotti in the second round via rear-naked choke.

==== Bellator Lightweight World Grand Prix ====
On January 11, 2023, Barnaoui was announced as one of the 8 participants in the $1 million Bellator Lightweight World Grand Prix. Barnaoui was scheduled to face Sidney Outlaw on May 12, 2023, at Bellator 296. However at the end of February, Outlaw tested positive for banned substances and was suspended, resulting in him being replaced by the alternate, Brent Primus. Barnaoui lost the back-and-forth bout by unanimous decision.

==== Post Grand Prix ====
Barnaoui faced Jay-Jay Wilson on September 23, 2023, at Bellator 299. He lost the fight by unanimous decision.

Barnaoui faced Yusuke Yachi on May 17, 2024 at Bellator Champions Series 2. He won the fight by a brado choke submission in the first round.

Barnaoui faced Alfie Davis on November 29, 2024, at PFL 10. He won the fight via a rear-naked choke submission in the third round.

Barnaoui was scheduled to face Archie Colgan in the main event on May 23, 2025, at PFL Europe Paris. However in early May, the organization announced that the event was cancelled. The bout was re-scheduled and took place as a title eliminator on June 20, 2025, at PFL 6. Barnaoui lost the bout via unanimous decision.

== Championships and accomplishments ==
- Road Fighting Championship
  - Road FC Lightweight Championship (One time)
  - Road FC $1 Million Dollar Lightweight Tournament 'Road To A-Sol'
- M-1 Global
  - M-1 Lightweight Championship (One time)
- BAMMA
  - BAMMA World Lightweight Championship (One time)
    - One successful title defense
- 100% Fight
  - 100% Fight Lightweight Championship (One time)

== Mixed martial arts record ==
Professional record breakdown
29 matches	22 wins	7 losses
By knockout	6	0
By submission	15	0
By decision	1	7

Res.	Record	Opponent	Method	Event	Date	Round	Time	Location	Notes
Loss	22–7	Archie Colgan	Decision (unanimous)	PFL 6 (2025)	June 20, 2025	3	5:00	Wichita, Kansas, United States	Bellator Lightweight title eliminator.
Win	22–6	Alfie Davis	Submission (rear-naked choke)	PFL 10 (2024)	November 29, 2024	3	3:41	Riyadh, Saudi Arabia	
Win	21–6	Yusuke Yachi	Submission (brabo choke)	Bellator Champions Series 2	May 17, 2024	1	4:08	Paris, France	
Loss	20–6	Jay Jay Wilson	Decision (unanimous)	Bellator 299	September 23, 2023	3	5:00	Dublin, Ireland	
Loss	20–5	Brent Primus	Decision (unanimous)	Bellator 296	May 12, 2023	5	5:00	Paris, France	Bellator Lightweight World Grand Prix Quarterfinal.
Win	20–4	Adam Piccolotti	Submission (rear-naked choke)	Bellator 287	October 29, 2022	2	2:51	Milan, Italy	
Win	19–4	Kwon A-sol	Submission (rear-naked choke)	Road FC 053	May 18, 2019	1	3:44	Jeju, South Korea	Won the Road FC $1 Million Lightweight Championship.
Win	18–4	Shamil Zavurov	KO (flying knee)	Road FC 052	February 23, 2019	3	0:30	Seoul, South Korea	Won the Road FC Lightweight Tournament.
Win	17–4	Kota Shimoishi	Submission (rear-naked choke)	Road FC 046	March 10, 2018	3	1:47	Seoul, South Korea	Road FC Lightweight Tournament Semifinal.
Win	16–4	Nandin-Erdene Munguntsooj	Submission (rear-naked choke)	Road FC 044	November 11, 2017	2	2:02	Shijiazhuang, China	Road FC Lightweight Tournament Quarterfinal.
Win	15–4	Kim Chang-hyun	Submission (rear-naked choke)	Road FC 040	July 15, 2017	1	4:28	Seoul, South Korea	Road FC Lightweight Tournament Round of 16.
Win	14–4	Ki Won-bin	Submission (rear-naked choke)	Road FC 038	April 15, 2017	1	4:46	Seoul, South Korea	
Win	13–4	Łukasz Chlewicki	TKO (doctor stoppage)	KSW 37	December 3, 2016	1	3:09	Kraków, Poland	
Loss	12–4	Mateusz Gamrot	Decision (unanimous)	KSW 35	May 27, 2016	3	5:00	Gdańsk/Sopot, Poland	For the vacant KSW Lightweight Championship. Fight of the Night.
Loss	12–3	Ivan Buchinger	Decision (unanimous)	M-1 Challenge 62	October 10, 2015	5	5:00	Sochi, Russia	For the M-1 Global Featherweight Championship.
Win	12–2	Maxim Divnich	TKO (knee and punches)	M-1 Challenge 57	May 2, 2015	1	4:47	Orenburg, Russia	Won the M-1 Global Lightweight Championship.
Win	11–2	Colin Fletcher	Submission (rear-naked choke)	BAMMA 14	December 14, 2013	1	4:00	Birmingham, England	Defended the BAMMA World Lightweight Championship.
Win	10–2	Curt Warburton	TKO (punches)	BAMMA 13	September 14, 2013	1	4:08	Birmingham, England	Won the vacant BAMMA World Lightweight Championship.
Win	9–2	Zulfikar Usmanov	Submission (rear-naked choke)	M-1 Challenge 41	August 21, 2013	3	4:19	Saint Petersburg, Russia	
Loss	8–2	Islam Makhachev	Decision (unanimous)	M-1 Challenge 38	April 9, 2013	3	5:00	Saint Petersburg, Russia	
Win	8–1	Ivan Musardo	TKO (punches)	SHC 7	March 9, 2013	1	2:03	Geneva, Switzerland	
Loss	7–1	Kevin Lee	Decision (unanimous)	Instinct MMA: Instinct Fighting 4	June 29, 2012	3	5:00	Montreal, Quebec, Canada	
Win	7–0	Brad Wheeler	Submission (rear-naked choke)	Cage Warriors: Fight Night 4	March 16, 2012	3	4:26	Dubai, United Arab Emirates	
Win	6–0	Araik Margarian	Submission (rear-naked choke)	100% Fight 7	November 12, 2011	2	4:03	Aubervilliers, France	
Win	5–0	Yves Landu	Decision (split)	100% Fight 5	May 28, 2011	3	5:00	Paris, France	
Win	4–0	Julien Boussuge	TKO (knees)	100% Fight 5	May 28, 2011	2	3:51	Paris, France	
Win	3–0	Chabane Chaibeddra	Submission (north-south choke)	100% Fight: Contenders 10	February 19, 2011	2	2:07	Paris, France	
Win	2–0	Gregoire Lambert	Submission (north-south choke)	100% Fight: Contenders 10	February 19, 2011	1	3:25	Paris, France	
Win	1–0	Gaetan Hurtel	Submission (rear-naked choke)	100% Fight: Contenders 10	February 19, 2011	2	4:00	Paris, France	

== See also ==
- List of current Bellator MMA fighters
- List of male mixed martial artists
