= Shamil Zavurov =

Russian mixed martial arts fighter

- Born: Shamil Magomedovich Zavurov; July 4, 1984 (age 42); Kirovaul, Dagestan ASSR, Russian SFSR, Soviet Union
- Native name: Шамиль Завуров
- Other names: Lion of Dagestan
- Nationality: Russian
- Height: 1.73 m (5 ft 8 in)
- Weight: 155 lb (70 kg; 11.1 st)
- Division: Welterweight (2004–2012); Lightweight (2012–2021)
- Reach: 68 in (173 cm)
- Style: Combat sambo
- Fighting out of: St. Petersburg, Leningrad; Derbent, Dagestan
- Team: RusFighters Sport Club; Champion Club Derbent; Fight Nights Gym; Akhmat Fight Club
- Trainer: Abdulmanap Nurmagomedov
- Rank: 1st International Master of Sports in Sambo; Master of Sports in Freestyle Wrestling
- Years active: 2004–2021

Mixed martial arts record
- Total: 48
- Wins: 40
- By knockout: 13
- By submission: 5
- By decision: 22
- Losses: 7
- By knockout: 3
- By submission: 2
- By decision: 2
- Draws: 1

Other information
- Notable relatives: Frodo Khasbulaev, cousin Khabib Nurmagomedov, second cousin
- Mixed martial arts record from Sherdog

Shamil Magomedovich Zavurov (Russian: Шамиль Магомедович Завуров; born July 4, 1984) is a Russian former professional mixed martial artist, who competed in the Welterweight and Lightweight divisions. A professional MMA competitor since 2004, he is the former M-1 Global World Welterweight champion.

== Early life ==
Zavurov attended high school in Makhachkala, the capital of Dagestan, where he began training in freestyle wrestling under Mairbek Yusupov (member of the 1977-78 USSR team who went on to coach Dagestan’s freestyle wrestling team). Post-school, he studied at the Dagestan State Pedagogical University, graduating from the Faculty of Physical Culture and Sports and also studied law at the Dagestan Institute of Finance and Law. He continued working on his martial arts training, taking up Combat Sambo, and also started a family – he is married with two sons and a daughter. He likes to employ the techniques of Georges St-Pierre, whom he is a fan of. Zavurov is undefeated in combat sambo (153-0)

== Mixed martial arts career ==
Shamil Zavurov has achieved a great deal of success in combat sports. In addition to more than 50 victories in amateur and semi-professional MMA, he has triumphed more than 50 times in Combat Sambo bouts, in the process winning three world championships (2004, 2005, and 2007). He has also won international tournaments in Wushu Sanda (2003) and wrestling and was the 2002 Dagestani champion in Wushu Sanda in the youth division. In 2005 and 2007, he won Russian national championships and was twice the CIS champion in hand-to-hand combat.

The hardest fight in Zavurov's career was his unanimous decision victory over Seydina Seck in which his arm was broken and he sustained torn ligaments – these injuries still cause him pain. Zavurov still wonders about the only defeat of his career, a split decision loss to Rashid Magomedov, which was controversial in that commentators and viewers disagreed with the judges' decision. It was Zavurov's first fight in more than a year, his return after a serious injury he sustained after being drafted into the army.

In fighting in the Eastern European M-1 Welterweight tournament, Zavurov defeated Radik Iboyan with a second round technical knockout and won a hard-fought semi-final against Ramazan Abdulzhalilov that went the full distance. In the tournament final, Zavurov defeated Magomedrasul Khasbulaev with a "text-book rear-naked-choke submission." Since winning the tournament, Zavurov has compiled four further victories in a single three-week period, against Vladimir Katyihin, Vasily Novikov, Vener Galiev, and Jaroslav Poborsky.

=== M-1 Global ===
Shamil Zavurov was expecting to face Tom "Da Tank" Gallicchio, the Americas selection champion, for the title but Gallicchio was removed following "an infringement of contractual obligations". Gallicchio was replaced by Abner Lloveras, the Western European M-1 Global tournament victor. Zavurov defeated Lloveras via fourth-round TKO to become the inaugural M-1 Global Welterweight Champion.

In the event’s second championship bout, Russian Shamil Zavurov edged 2010 World Victory Road welterweight grand prix runner-up Yasubey Enomoto in a five-round affair.

Zavurov was scheduled to rematch his lone defeat as he was to defend his title against Rashid Magomedov at M-1 Challenge XXX on December 9, 2011. The match, however, has been postponed and Zavurov instead faced Yasubey Enomoto in a rematch. He lost the back-and-forth battle via submission in the fifth round.

Zavurov faced Alexander Yakovlev on March 16, 2012 at M-1 Challenge 31, with the fight ending in a draw (judges scorecards: 29–28 Zavurov, 28–28, 28–28)

=== Bellator Fighting Championships ===
Zavurov signed with Bellator MMA and was reported to take part in Bellator MMA: Season Eight. However, for reasons unexplained, did not take part in any event of the season.

=== World Fighting Championship Akhmat ===
Zavurov faced Brazilian Rodrigo Caporal in the quarterfinal at WFCA 16 on March 12, 2016. He won the fight via unanimous decision.

Zavurov faced to Luciano Palhano at WFCA 22 on May 22, 2016. He won the fight via unanimous decision.

Zavurov faced Chechen super star Khusein Khaliev at WCFA 23 Lightweight Grand Prix on October 4, 2016. He lost the fight via knockout in the second round.

=== Road Fighting Championship ===
In early 2017, Zavurov entered Road Fighting Championship's Road FC $1 Million Dollar Lightweight Tournament. In the International Trials, he face Won Ki Kim at Road FC 036 on February 11, 2017. He won the fight by unanimous decision to enter the tournament.

In the opening round, Zavurov faced Leo Kuntz at Road FC 040 on July 15, 2017. He again won by unanimous decision. In the quarterfinals, he faced Khuukhenkhuu Amartuvshin Road FC 044 on November 11, 2017. He won the fight by unanimous decision. In the semifinals, Zavurov faced Ronys Torres at Road FC 046 on March 10, 2018. He again won by unanimous decision to make it to the tournament final. He lost to Mansour Barnaoui at Road FC 052 on February 23, 2019.

=== Gorilla Fighting Championship ===
After the Road FC tournament, Zavurov was scheduled to fight Matias Juarez at GFC 11 on May 3, 2019. However, the bout was cancelled. Then, Zavurov was booked to face Phil Baroni at GFC 14 on July 13, 2019. In turn, Baroni withdrew from the fight and was replaced by his formerly scheduled opponent Juarez. Zavurov won the fight via unanimous decision.

Zavurov was then scheduled to face Ivica Trušček at GFC 17 on September 27, 2019. Trušček withdrew from the bout due to an unknown reason.

=== Return to Road FC ===
He then returned to the Road FC, facing A Sol Kwon at Road FC 56 on November 9, 2019. He won the fight via unanimous decision.

=== Return to GFC ===
Zavurov's bout with Trušček was rebooked to take place at GFC 20 on November 23, 2019. Zavurov won the bout via technical knockout in the third round.

After a year away from competition, Zavurov then faced Renato Gomes at UAE Warriors 15 on January 15, 2021. Zavurov knocked Gomes down in the first round enroute to decision victory.

Zavurov faced Ricardo Tirloni at Eagle Fighting Championship 37 on June 18, 2021. He won the bout via TKO due to ground and pound in the second round.

Zavurov faced Nariman Abbasov on September 17, 2021 at AMC Fight Nights: Abdulmanap Nurmagomedov Memory Tournament. He got knocked out in the first round and retired after the bout.

== Championships and accomplishments ==
=== Mixed martial arts ===
- M-1 Global
  - M-1 Selection 2010 Eastern Europe Welterweight
  - M-1 Global Welterweight Championship (One time; former)
    - Two successful title defenses
  - Euro-Asia Champion (One time)
    - One successful title defense
- Octagon Fighting Sensation
  - OFS Welterweight Championship (one time; former)
    - One successful title defense

=== Sambo ===
- Federation International Amateur de Sambo
  - Combat Sambo World champion (Three-time)
- All-Russian Sambo Federation
  - Russian Combat Sambo National Championships 21st (2010)

== Mixed martial arts record ==
Professional record breakdown
48 matches	40 wins	7 losses
By knockout	13	3
By submission	5	2
By decision	22	2
Draws	1	

Res.	Record	Opponent	Method	Event	Date	Round	Time	Location	Notes
Loss	40–7–1	Nariman Abbasov	KO (punches)	AMC Fight Nights: Abdulmanap Nurmagomedov Memory Tournament	September 17, 2021	1	4:13	Moscow, Russia	For the AMC Fight Nights Lightweight Championship.
Win	40–6–1	Ricardo Tirloni	TKO (punches)	Eagle Fighting Championship 37	June 18, 2021	2	2:12	Almaty, Kazakhstan	
Win	39–6–1	Renato Gomes	Decision (unanimous)	UAE Warriors 15 & EFC 32	January 15, 2021	3	5:00	Abu Dhabi, United Arab Emirates	Catchweight (160 lbs) bout.
Win	38–6–1	Ivica Trušček	TKO	GFC 20	November 23, 2019	3	3:13	Tashkent, Uzbekistan	
Win	37–6–1	A-Sol Kwon	Decision (unanimous)	Road FC 56	November 9, 2019	3	5:00	Yeosu, South Korea	
Win	36–6–1	Matias Juarez	Decision (unanimous)	GFC 14	July 13, 2019	3	5:00	Kaspiysk, Russia	
Loss	35–6–1	Mansour Barnaoui	KO (flying knee)	Road FC 052	February 23, 2019	3	0:30	Seoul, South Korea	Road FC $1 Million Lightweight Tournament Final.
Win	35–5–1	Ronys Torres	Decision (unanimous)	Road FC 046	March 10, 2018	3	5:00	Seoul, South Korea	Road FC $1 Million Lightweight Tournament Semifinals.
Win	34–5–1	Khuukhenkhuu Amartuvshin	Decision (unanimous)	Road FC 044	November 11, 2017	3	5:00	Shijiazhuang, Hebei, China	Road FC $1 Million Lightweight Tournament Quarterfinals.
Win	33–5–1	Leo Kuntz	Decision (unanimous)	Road FC 040	July 15, 2017	3	5:00	Seoul, South Korea	Road FC $1 Million Lightweight Tournament Opening Round.
Win	32–5–1	Jorge Rodrigues	Decision (unanimous)	WFCA 38: Battle in Grozny	May 21, 2017	3	5:00	Grozny, Russia	
Win	31–5–1	Won Ki Kim	Decision (unanimous)	Road FC 036	February 11, 2017	3	5:00	Seoul, South Korea	International Trials for Road FC $1 Million Lightweight Tournament.
Win	30–5–1	Bagautdin Abasov	Decision (unanimous)	OFS 10: The Heroes Return	December 10, 2016	3	5:00	Yaroslavl, Russia	Defended the OFS Welterweight Championship.
Loss	29–5–1	Khusein Khaliev	KO (knee)	WFCA 23: Final	October 4, 2016	2	3:05	Grozny, Chechnya, Russia	Akhmat GP Final.
Win	29–4–1	Luciano Palhano	Decision (unanimous)	WFCA 22: Grand Prix Akhmat	May 22, 2016	3	5:00	Grozny, Chechnya, Russia	Akhmat GP Semifinal.
Win	28–4–1	Rodrigo Caporal	Decision (unanimous)	WFCA 16: Grand Prix Akhmat	March 12, 2016	3	5:00	Grozny, Chechnya, Russia	Akhmat GP Quarterfinal.
Loss	27–4–1	Yasubey Enomoto	Submission (guillotine choke)	World FC Akhmat: Grozny Fights 9	October 4, 2015	3	2:28	Grozny, Chechnya, Russia	
Win	27–3–1	Hermes França	KO (punch)	World FC Akhmat: Grozny Fights 3	June 13, 2015	1	0:42	Grozny, Chechnya, Russia	
Win	26–3–1	Sergey Faley	Decision (unanimous)	Octagon Fighting Sensation 3	February 28, 2015	3	5:00	Yaroslavl, Yaroslavl Oblast, Russia	Won OFS Welterweight Championship.
Win	25–3–1	Luiz Ricardo Simon	KO (punches)	New Stream	October 31, 2014	2	1:12	Moscow, Moscow Oblast, Russia	
Win	24–3–1	Davlat Alimov	TKO (punches)	Octagon Fighting Sensation 1	May 11, 2014	3	1:18	Yaroslavl, Yaroslavl Oblast, Russia	
Win	23–3–1	Renat Lyatifov	Decision (unanimous)	MMA Star in the Ring - Shamil vs. Renat	March 1, 2014	3	5:00	Makhachkala, Republic of Dagestan, Russia	
Win	22–3–1	Harun Kina	Decision (unanimous)	Fight Nights - Battle on Terek 1	October 4, 2013	3	5:00	Grozny, Chechnya, Russia	
Loss	21–3–1	Yasubey Enomoto	Decision (unanimous)	Fight Nights - Battle of Moscow 12	June 21, 2013	3	5:00	Moscow, Moscow Oblast, Russia	Welterweight bout.
Win	21–2–1	Eduardo Pachu	TKO (punches)	Fight Nights - Battle of Moscow 11	April 20, 2013	1	3:24	Moscow, Moscow Oblast, Russia	
Win	20–2–1	Juha-Pekka Vainikainen	Decision (unanimous)	Battle of the Stars 1	December 22, 2012	3	5:00	Kaspiysk, Dagestan, Russia	
Win	19–2–1	Anatoly Safronov	TKO (kick to the body and punches)	League S-70: Russian Championship Third Round	April 6, 2012	1	1:34	Moscow, Russia	
Draw	18–2–1	Alexander Yakovlev	Draw (majority)	M-1 Challenge 31	March 16, 2012	3	5:00	St. Petersburg, Russia	
Loss	18–2	Yasubey Enomoto	Submission (guillotine choke)	M-1 Challenge 30: Zavurov vs. Enomoto	December 9, 2011	5	4:10	Costa Mesa, California, United States	Lost the M-1 Global Welterweight Championship.
Win	18–1	Zhanybek Amatov	TKO (leg injury)	Fight Nights: Battle of Moscow 4	July 7, 2011	2	1:34	Moscow, Russia	Defended the Euro-Asia Welterweight Championship.
Win	17–1	Yasubey Enomoto	Decision (unanimous)	M-1 Challenge 25: Zavurov vs. Enomoto	April 28, 2011	5	5:00	St. Petersburg, Russia	Defended the M-1 Global Welterweight Championship.
Win	16–1	Yuri Izotov	Decision (unanimous)	Lipetsk Mix Federation: Russian Cities Tournament	March 18, 2011	3	5:00	Lipetsk, Russia	
Win	15–1	Tom Gallicchio	TKO (punches)	M-1 Challenge 23: Guram vs. Grishin	March 5, 2011	2	1:11	Moscow, Russia	Defended the M-1 Global Welterweight Championship.
Win	14–1	Abner Lloveras	TKO (punches)	M-1 Challenge 22: Narkun vs. Vasilevsky	December 10, 2010	4	4:22	Moscow, Russia	Won the inaugural M-1 Global Welterweight Championship.
Win	13–1	Jaroslav Poborsky	TKO (punches)	Heroes Gate 2	October 21, 2010	1	2:50	Prague, Czech Republic	
Win	12–1	Vener Galiev	Decision (unanimous)	Fight Nights: Battle of Moscow 2	October 16, 2010	2	5:00	Moscow, Russia	Won Euro-Asia Welterweight Championship.
Win	11–1	Vasily Novikov	Submission (rear-naked choke)	Fight Nights: Battle of Moscow 2	October 16, 2010	1	2:53	Moscow, Russia	
Win	10–1	Vladimir Katyihin	Decision (unanimous)	ProFC: Union Nation Cup 8	October 1, 2010	2	5:00	Odesa, Ukraine	
Win	9–1	Frodo Khasbulaev	Submission (rear-naked choke)	M-1 Selection 2010: Eastern Europe Finals	July 22, 2010	1	3:16	Moscow, Russia	2010 M-1 Eastern Europe Welterweight Selection Final.
Win	8–1	Ramazan Abdulzhalilov	Decision (unanimous)	M-1 Selection 2010: Eastern Europe Round 3	May 28, 2010	3	5:00	Kyiv, Ukraine	
Win	7–1	Radik Iboyan	TKO (punches)	M-1 Selection 2010: Eastern Europe Round 2	April 10, 2010	2	3:54	Kyiv, Ukraine	
Win	6–1	Seydina Seck	Decision (unanimous)	Saturn & RusFighters: Battle of Gladiators	February 13, 2010	3	5:00	Omsk, Russia	
Loss	5–1	Rashid Magomedov	Decision (split)	M-1 Challenge: 2009 Selections 9	November 3, 2009	3	5:00	St. Petersburg, Russia	
Win	5–0	Aleksey Gonchar	Submission (armbar)	CSFU: Champions League	September 13, 2008	2	3:50	Poltava, Ukraine	
Win	4–0	Hamiz Mamedov	Decision (unanimous)	Mission of Peace: Martial Arts Festival	May 23, 2008	3	3:00	Ekaterinburg, Russia	
Win	3–0	Mukhamed Aushev	KO (punches)	Combat Fighting Federation: International MMA Tournament	December 9, 2007	3	2:59	Tyumen, Russia	
Win	2–0	Vitaly Gogishvilli	Submission (rear-naked choke)	Mixfight Georgia: Georgia vs. Russia	October 15, 2005	1	2:05	Tbilisi, Georgia	
Win	1–0	Magomed Kurmagomedov	Submission (armbar)	Extreme FC: Octagon 3	February 27, 2004	2	1:20	Odesa, Ukraine	

Except where otherwise indicated, details provided in the record box are taken from Sherdog
