= Bellator 287 =

MMA event

Bellator 287: Piccolotti vs. Barnaoui
- The poster for Bellator 287: Piccolotti vs. Barnaoui
- Promotion: Bellator MMA
- Date: October 29, 2022
- Venue: Allianz Cloud Arena
- City: Milan, Italy

Event chronology
Bellator 286: Pitbull vs. Borics	Bellator 287: Piccolotti vs. Barnaoui	Bellator 288: Nemkov vs. Anderson 2

Bellator 287: Piccolotti vs. Barnaoui (also known as Bellator Milan) was a mixed martial arts event produced by Bellator MMA, that took place on October 29, 2022, at the Allianz Cloud Arena in Milan, Italy.

== Background ==
The event marked the promotion's fifth visit to Milan and first since Bellator Milan 3 in October 2020.

A lightweight bout between Adam Piccolotti and promotional newcomer Mansour Barnaoui headlined the event.

A middleweight bout between Steven Hill and Walter Pugliesi was booked for this event, but Pugliesi was forced to pull out due to personal issues and was replaced by Andrea Fusi in a catchweight bout at 82 kg.

A heavyweight bout between Denis Stojnić and Oleg Popov was scheduled for this event, however the bout was called citing "Covid-19 protocols". Days later, Stojnić was arrested as part of mass arrests of individuals involved in an organized crime ring.

== Results ==
Main Card (Showtime)
Weight class				Method	Round	Time	Notes
Lightweight	Mansour Barnaoui	def.	Adam Piccolotti	Submission (rear-naked choke)	2	2:51
Middleweight	Fabian Edwards	def.	Charlie Ward	Decision (unanimous) (29–28, 30–27, 30–27)	3	5:00
Lightweight	Tim Wilde	def.	Saul Rogers	Decision (split) (29–28, 28–29, 29–28)	3	5:00
Featherweight	Justin Gonzalez	def.	Andrew Fisher	Decision (unanimous) (30–27, 30–27, 30–27)	3	5:00
Preliminary card (YouTube/Pluto TV)
Lightweight	Daniele Scatizzi	def.	Davy Gallon	Decision (unanimous) (29-28, 29-28, 29-28)	3	5:00
Middleweight	Costello van Steenis	def.	Kamil Oniszczuk	Submission (brabo choke)	2	3:02
Lightweight	Alfie Davis	def.	Thibault Gouti	Decision (unanimous) (30-27, 30-27, 30-27)	3	5:00
Women's Strawweight	Chiara Penco	def.	Manuela Marconetto	Decision (split) (29-28, 28-29, 30-27)	3	5:00
Featherweight	Yves Landu	def.	Walter Cogliandro	Decision (unanimous) (30-26, 30-27, 30-27)	3	5:00
Light Heavyweight	Simon Biyong	def.	Dragos Zubco	TKO (punches)	2	3:36
Welterweight	Nicolò Solli	def.	Bourama Camara	Decision (split) (29–28, 28–29, 29–28)	3	5:00
Light Heavyweight	Luke Trainer	def.	Lucas Alsina	Submission (rear-naked choke)	1	1:54
Catchweight (181 lb)	Steven Hill	def.	Andrea Fusi	Decision (unanimous) (30-27, 29-27, 30-26)	3	5:00
Bantamweight	Sarvarjon Khamidov	def.	José Maria Tomé	TKO (body kick and punches)	1	1:01
Preliminary card (Dark bouts)
Featherweight	Edoardo Caiazza	def.	Alex Bertinazzi	TKO (punches)	1	4:09
Bantamweight	Luca Iovine	def.	Percy Herrera	Submission (rear-naked choke)	1	3:40
Bantamweight	Ayoub Nacer	def.	Cherif Ba Pape	KO (punches)	1	0:12

== See also ==
- 2022 in Bellator MMA
- List of Bellator MMA events
- List of current Bellator fighters
