= Chris Barnett =

American mixed martial arts fighter

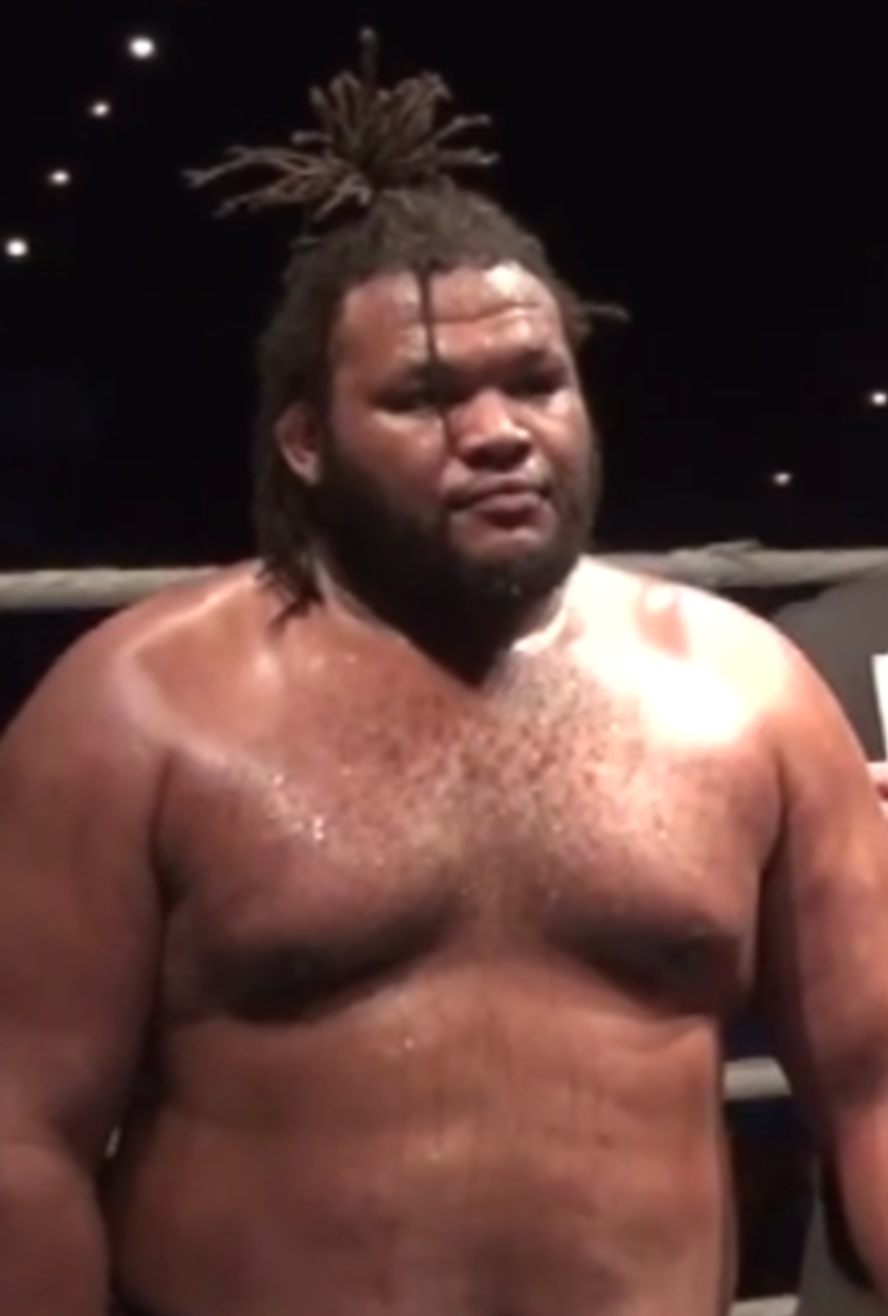
- Barnett in 2017
- Born: Christopher James Barnett; June 14, 1986 (age 40); Zaragoza, Spain
- Other names: Beastboy; Huggy Bear; El Maño
- Nationality: American
- Height: 5 ft 9 in (175 cm)
- Weight: 264 lb (120 kg; 18 st 12 lb)
- Division: Heavyweight (present); Super Heavyweight
- Reach: 75 in (191 cm)
- Fighting out of: Athens, Georgia, U.S.
- Team: Barnett Taekwondo Academy
- Rank: 3rd dan black belt in Taekwondo
- Years active: 2009–present

Professional boxing record
- Total: 6
- Wins: 2
- By knockout: 1
- Losses: 4
- By knockout: 1

Mixed martial arts record
- Total: 33
- Wins: 23
- By knockout: 18
- By decision: 5
- Losses: 10
- By knockout: 4
- By submission: 1
- By decision: 5

Other information
- Boxing record from BoxRec
- Mixed martial arts record from Sherdog

Christopher James Barnett (born June 14, 1986) is an American professional mixed martial artist who competed in the Heavyweight division of the Ultimate Fighting Championship (UFC).

== Background ==
Barnett was born in Zaragoza, Spain, where his father was stationed as a United States Air Force captain. Around the age of four, the family returned to the United States and after bouncing around they settled in Georgia. Both of his parents are black belts in Taekwondo, and he started training the martial art around the age of five. Barnett went to Campbellsville University and University of South Florida and graduated with a bachelor's degree. At Campbellsville, Barnett competed in Wrestling on a scholarship and began training in Judo. Barnett received an invitation to try out mixed martial arts after showing his moves in a dance battle, and started training immediately.

== Mixed martial arts career ==
=== Early career ===
Starting his professional career in 2009, Barnett fought primarily in Xtreme Fighting Championships and started 5–0 with four knockouts. He also fought in other notable Asian organizations, such as Rizin Fighting Federation, Road Fighting Championship, and Inoki Genome Federation.

=== Ultimate Fighting Championship ===
After 12 years, Barnett finally got a call from the UFC to replace Askar Mozharov on short notice against Ben Rothwell at UFC Fight Night 188 on May 22, 2021. He lost the bout by submission in the second round.

In September 2021, news surfaced that Barnett had tested positive for marijuana stemming from his UFC debut, and he was suspended for 4.5 months, becoming eligible to return on October 6, 2021.

In his next fight, Barnett fought Gian Villante in Villante's retirement fight at UFC 268 on November 6, 2021, in Madison Square Garden. He won the fight by technical knockout in the second round via spinning wheel kick and punches. The win earned him the Performance of the Night bonus award.

Barnett next faced promotional newcomer Martin Buday at UFC Fight Night 206 on April 16, 2022. Barnett lost the fight via technical unanimous decision after being rendered unable to continue due to an unintentional elbow to the back of the head in the third round.

Barnett most recently faced Jake Collier on September 10, 2022, at UFC 279. At the weigh-ins, Barnett weighed in at 267.5 pounds, 1.5 pounds over the non-title heavyweight limit. Barnett was fined 20% of his purse, which went to his opponent Collier. Barnett suffered a knockdown and heavy ground and pound in the first, however he rallied and won the fight via TKO in the second round.

Barnett was scheduled to face Chase Sherman on April 8, 2023, at UFC 287. However, Barnett pulled out due to undisclosed reasons in early April and was replaced by Karl Williams.

Barnett was scheduled to face Mohammed Usman on March 23, 2024, at UFC on ESPN 53. However, Barnett withdrew for unknown reasons and was replaced by Mick Parkin.

Barnett was scheduled to face Waldo Cortes-Acosta on October 12, 2024 at UFC Fight Night 244. However, Cortes-Acosta withdrew from the fight for unknown reasons and was replaced by Junior Tafa. Subsequently, Barnett withdrew after being unable to travel due to Hurricane Milton and was replaced by UFC newcomer Sean Sharaf.

Replacing an injured Justin Tafa, Barnett was scheduled to face Kennedy Nzechukwu on October 26, 2024 at UFC 308. Barnett lost the fight by technical knockout in the first round.

Barnett faced Hamdy Abdelwahab on October 25, 2025 at UFC 321. He lost the fight by unanimous decision.

On November 10, 2025, it was reported that Barnett was removed from the UFC roster.

== Karate Combat ==
Barnett officially signed with Karate Combat on November 26, 2025, with the promotion announcing that he would make his debut on December 5 at KC 58 against Johnathan “Big Baby” Miller in a heavyweight bout. The fight ended quickly, as Barnett secured a takedown within the opening minute, slamming Miller’s head into the ramp and earning a TKO victory in just 61 seconds.

== Personal life ==
Barnett's wife died in May 2022 after a battle with encephalitis. Barnett and his late wife have a daughter and a son.

== Championships and accomplishments ==
- Ultimate Fighting Championship
  - Performance of the Night (One time) vs. Gian Villante
  - UFC.com Awards
    - 2021: Ranked #8 Knockout of the Year vs. Gian Villante
- Island Fights
  - IF Super Heavyweight Championship (one time)
    - One successful title defense
- Yahoo! Sports
  - 2021 Knockout of the Year vs. Gian Villante at UFC 268

== Mixed martial arts record ==
Professional record breakdown
33 matches	23 wins	10 losses
By knockout	18	4
By submission	0	1
By decision	5	5

Res.	Record	Opponent	Method	Event	Date	Round	Time	Location	Notes
Loss	23–10	Hamdy Abdelwahab	Decision (unanimous)	UFC 321	October 25, 2025	3	5:00	Abu Dhabi, United Arab Emirates	Abdelwahab was deducted one point in round 1 due to an illegal elbow to the back of the head.
Loss	23–9	Kennedy Nzechukwu	TKO (knee to the body and punches)	UFC 308	October 26, 2024	1	4:27	Abu Dhabi, United Arab Emirates	
Win	23–8	Jake Collier	TKO (punches)	UFC 279	September 10, 2022	2	2:24	Las Vegas, Nevada, United States	Catchweight (267.5 lb) bout; Barnett missed weight.
Loss	22–8	Martin Buday	Technical Decision (unanimous)	UFC on ESPN: Luque vs. Muhammad 2	April 16, 2022	3	1:37	Las Vegas, Nevada, United States	An inadvertent elbow to the back of head rendered Barnett unable to continue.
Win	22–7	Gian Villante	TKO (spinning wheel kick and punches)	UFC 268	November 6, 2021	2	2:23	New York City, New York, United States	Performance of the Night.
Loss	21–7	Ben Rothwell	Submission (guillotine choke)	UFC Fight Night: Font vs. Garbrandt	May 22, 2021	2	2:07	Las Vegas, Nevada, United States	Return to Heavyweight.
Win	21–6	Ahmed Tijani Shehu	TKO (punches)	UAE Warriors 13	September 25, 2020	1	0:58	Abu Dhabi, United Arab Emirates	
Win	20–6	Rashaun Jackson	Decision (split)	Island Fights 60	October 10, 2019	3	5:00	Columbus, Georgia, United States	Heavyweight bout.
Win	19–6	Shim Yoon-jae	TKO (punch)	Road FC 055	September 8, 2019	1	3:44	Daegu, South Korea	
Win	18–6	Robert Neal	Decision (unanimous)	Island Fights 52	February 7, 2019	3	5:00	Pensacola, Florida, United States	Heavyweight bout.
Win	17–6	Alexandru Lungu	TKO (punches)	Road FC 047	May 12, 2018	1	2:34	Beijing, China	
Win	16–6	Shim Yoon-jae	TKO (spinning back kick)	Road FC 045	December 23, 2017	2	3:33	Seoul, South Korea	
Loss	15–6	Alex Nicholson	KO (elbow)	Island Fights 42	October 14, 2017	1	0:40	Pensacola, Florida, United States	Heavyweight bout.
Loss	15–5	Myung Hyun-man	KO (punch)	Road FC 041	August 12, 2017	2	1:53	Wanju, South Korea	
Loss	15–4	Myung Hyun-man	TKO (doctor stoppage)	Road FC 038	April 15, 2017	1	2:17	Seoul, South Korea	
Win	15–3	Frank Tate	Decision (split)	Island Fights 39	November 18, 2016	3	5:00	Pensacola, Florida, United States	Heavyweight bout.
Loss	14–3	Kirill Sidelnikov	Decision (split)	Rizin 1	April 17, 2016	3	5:00	Nagoya, Japan	
Win	14–2	Shinichi Suzukawa	TKO (punches)	Inoki Bom-Ba-Ye 2015	December 31, 2015	1	1:44	Sumida, Japan	
Loss	13–2	Oli Thompson	Decision (unanimous)	Inoki Genome Fight 4	August 29, 2015	2	5:00	Sumida, Japan	
Win	13–1	Emil Zahariev	KO (spinning back kick to the body)	Inoki Genome Fight 3	April 11, 2015	2	2:58	Sumida, Japan	
Win	12–1	Shinichi Suzukawa	TKO (punches)	Inoki Bom-Ba-Ye 2014	December 31, 2014	1	1:57	Sumida, Japan	
Win	11–1	Jon Hill	TKO (punches)	Island Fights 30	September 20, 2014	1	0:30	Pensacola, Florida, United States	Defended the Island Fights Super Heavyweight Championship.
Win	10–1	Travis Wiuff	TKO (punches)	Inoki Genome Fight 2	August 23, 2014	2	0:27	Sumida, Japan	
Win	9–1	Richard White	TKO (punches)	Island Fights 28	May 9, 2014	1	4:57	Pensacola, Florida, United States	Won the vacant Island Fights Super Heavyweight Championship.
Win	8–1	Demoreo Dennis	TKO (punches)	Island Fights 27	February 8, 2014	2	1:13	Pensacola, Florida, United States	Super Heavyweight debut.
Win	7–1	Walt Harris	Decision (unanimous)	World Extreme Fighting 46	April 22, 2011	3	5:00	Orlando, Florida, United States	
Win	6–1	Mario Rinaldi	TKO (punches)	Xtreme FC 13	December 3, 2010	2	1:44	Tampa, Florida, United States	
Loss	5–1	Eric Prindle	Decision (majority)	Martial Combat 12	October 16, 2010	3	5:00	Sentosa, Singapore	
Win	5–0	Jay White	KO (punches)	Xtreme FC 11	July 9, 2010	1	4:39	Tampa, Florida, United States	
Win	4–0	Joel Wyatt	TKO (punches)	World Cagefighting Championships 2	May 28, 2010	2	0:43	Allentown, Pennsylvania, United States	
Win	3–0	Kenny Garner	TKO (punches)	Xtreme FC 10	March 19, 2010	3	1:36	Tampa, Florida, United States	
Win	2–0	Daniel Perez	TKO (punches)	Xtreme FC 9	September 5, 2009	2	0:47	Tampa, Florida, United States	
Win	1–0	Johnathan Ivey	Decision (unanimous)	Xtreme FC 8	April 25, 2009	3	5:00	Knoxville, Tennessee, United States	Heavyweight debut.

== Karate Combat record ==
Professional record breakdown
1 match	1 win	0 losses
By knockout	1	0

Res.	Record	Opponent	Method	Event	Date	Round	Time	Location	Notes
Win	1–0	Johnathan Miller	TKO (slam and punches)	Karate Combat 58	5 December 2025	1	1:01	Doral, Florida, United States	

== Submission grappling record ==
1 Matches, 0 Wins, 1 Losses, 0 Draws
Result	Rec.	Opponent	Method	Event	Date	Division	Location
Loss	0–1	(Cuba) Yoel Romero	Submission (Kimura)	Dean Toole Promotions	June 15, 2019	Openweight	(United States) Pensacola, Florida

== Professional boxing record ==
6 fights	2 wins	4 losses
By knockout	1	1
By decision	1	3

No.	Result	Record	Opponent	Type	Round, time	Date	Location	Notes
6	Win	2–4	Demarcus Kemp	UD	4, 3:00	Aug 13, 2016	Pensacola Bay Center, Pensacola, Florida, U.S.	
5	Loss	1–4	Kenny Lacy	UD	4	Jun 1, 2012	A La Carte Event Pavilion, Tampa, Florida, U.S.	
4	Loss	1–3	Trevor Bryan	KO	2 (4), 2:04	Feb 10, 2012	Community Center, Palm Bay, Florida, U.S.	
3	Loss	1–2	Pedro Julio Rodriguez	UD	4	Nov 11, 2011	A La Carte Event Pavilion, Tampa, Florida, U.S.	
2	Loss	1–1	Nathaniel James	UD	4	Nov 4, 2011	Ritz Theatre, Tampa, Florida, U.S.	
1	Win	1–0	Michael Greeson	KO	2 (4), 2:12	Aug 12, 2011	DoubleTree Westshore Hotel, Tampa, Florida, U.S.	

== See also ==
- List of male mixed martial artists
