= Wonju Gymnasium =

Sports venue in Wonju, South Korea

Coordinates: 37°20′20.9″N 127°56′31.1″E

- Hangul: 원주종합체육관; Hanja: 原州綜合體育館
- Interactive map of Wonju Gymnasium
- Full name: Wonju General Gymnasium
- Location: Wonju, South Korea
- Owner: Wonju
- Operator: Wonju Cultural and Sports Office
- Capacity: 4,600 seats
- Surface: 23,034 m^{2} floor area

Construction
- Opened: August 10, 2013
- Cost: ₩5,000,000,000

Tenant
- Wonju DB Promy

Wonju Gymnasium is an arena in Wonju, South Korea. It is the home arena of the Wonju DB Promy of the Korean Basketball League. The complex includes above-ground and basement parking space as well as the team's training facilities and clubhouse, which is connected to the arena via a special underground walkway.

Prior to the opening of the Wonju Gymnasium, Wonju DB Promy had played at the outdated and much-maligned Chiak Gymnasium and did not have its own dedicated training ground and facilities. Its players had to work out at local neighborhood gyms. The lack of funding from the pre-Dongbu Insurance era meant that the Chiak Gymnasium was never renovated to meet modern-day standards despite drawing some of the biggest game-day crowds among the KBL teams. The Wonju municipal government agreed to invest ₩5 billion into the construction of a new purpose-built arena. It opened in time for the 2013–14 season.

== Events ==
In addition to basketball, Wonju Gymnasium has been used for concerts and other large-scale events during the off-season. It hosted the 4th APAN Star Awards, the 2026 LCK season Road to MSI esports tournament, and several Road Fighting Championship events.

During the COVID-19 pandemic, the arena doubled as a testing site for local residents.
