= List of current Road Fighting Championship fighters =

Here is a list of current fighters in the Road FC (Road Fighting Championship).

Each fight record has four categories: wins, losses, draws, and no-contests (NC). All fight records in this article are displayed in that order, with fights resulting in a no-contest listed in parentheses. Records below are retrieved from Tapology’s website.

== Fighters ==
=== Openweight ===
ISO	Name	Nickname	Record (win-loss-draw (nc))		
ISO	Name	Nickname	Total	Road FC	Year of Last Road FC fight
(South Korea)	Shim Gun-oh		7–5 (1)	7–5 (1)	2023
(South Korea)	Oh Il-hak		4–2	4–2	2023
(South Korea)	Bae Dong-hyun		5–4	3–3	2023
(Japan)	Taisei Sekino		6–5	3–0	2023

=== Light Heavyweight ===
ISO	Name	Nickname	Record (win-loss-draw (nc))		
ISO	Name	Nickname	Total	Road FC	Year of Last Road FC fight
(South Korea)	Kim Tae-in (C)		5–0	5–0	2024

=== Middleweight (84kg, 185 Ib) ===
ISO	Name	Nickname	Record (win-loss-draw (nc))		
ISO	Name	Nickname	Total	Road FC	Year of Last Road FC fight
(South Korea)	Hwang In-su (C)		6–1	6–1	2021
(South Korea)	Lim Dong-hwan		5–6	5–5	2023
(South Korea)	Choi Won-jun		5–4	5–4	2023

=== Lightweight (70kg, 154 Ib) ===
ISO	Name	Nickname	Record (win-loss-draw (nc))		
ISO	Name	Nickname	Total	Road FC	Year of Last Road FC fight
(South Korea)	Park Si-won (C)		8–0	6–0	2022
(South Korea) (Mongolia)	Nandin Erdene	Oka	17–9	15–7	2023
(South Korea)	Shin Dong-guk		5–6	5–6	2023
(South Korea)	Yeo Je-woo		5–3	4–3	2023
(South Korea)	Yoon Tae-young		5–1	5–1	2023
(South Korea)	Kim San		4–2	4–2	2023
(South Korea)	Kim Min-hyung		4–3	2–1	2023
(South Korea)	Han Woo-young		2–0	2–0	2023
(South Korea)	Park Hyeon-bin		0–1	0–1	2023

=== Featherweight ===
ISO	Name	Nickname	Record (win-loss-draw (nc))		
ISO	Name	Nickname	Total	Road FC	Year of Last Road FC fight
(South Korea)	Park Hae-jin (C)		10–3	8–3	2023

=== Bantamweight (63kg, 139 Ib) ===
ISO	Name	Nickname	Record (win-loss-draw (nc))		
ISO	Name	Nickname	Total	Road FC	Year of Last Road FC fight
(South Korea)	Kim Soo-chul		21–7–1	16–2–1	2023
(South Korea)	Yoo Jae-nam		9–10	7–4	2023
(South Korea)	Yang Ji-yong		8–1	6–1	2023
(South Korea)	Park Jae-seong		4–5	3–4	2023
(South Korea)	Han Min-hyoung		4–2	3–2	2023
(South Korea)	Choi Sergei		3–2	3–2	2023
(South Korea)	Son Jae-min		3–1	3–1	2023
(South Korea)	Kim Jun-seok		3–2	2–2	2023
(South Korea)	Cha Min-hyuk		1–3	1–3	2023
(South Korea)	Han Yoon-soo		2–2	1–1	2023
(South Korea)	Hong Tae-sun		1–1	1–1	2023

=== Flyweight (57kg, 126 Ib) ===
ISO	Name	Nickname	Record (win-loss-draw (nc))		
ISO	Name	Nickname	Total	Road FC	Year of Last Road FC fight
(South Korea)	Lee Jung-hyun	Doraemon	9–1	9–0	2023
(South Korea)	Jung Jae-bok		2–1	2–1	2023
(South Korea)	Lee Gil-soo		1–2	1–2	2023

=== Women's Strawweight ===
ISO	Name	Nickname	Record (win-loss-draw (nc))		
ISO	Name	Nickname	Total	Road FC	Year of Last Road FC fight
(South Korea)	Shin Yu-jin		4–0	4–0	2021
(South Korea)	Park Seo-young		2–4	2–2	2023

== See also ==
- List of Road FC champions
- List of Road FC events
- 2023 in Road FC
- List of current UFC fighters
- List of current ACA fighters
- List of current Bellator fighters
- List of current Brave CF fighters
- List of current GFL fighters
- List of current Invicta FC fighters
- List of current KSW fighters
- List of current ONE fighters
- List of current PFL fighters
- List of current Rizin FF fighters
