= George Roop =

American mixed martial arts fighter

- Born: November 10, 1981 (age 44); Tucson, Arizona, United States
- Height: 6 ft 1 in (1.85 m)
- Weight: 135 lb (61 kg; 9.6 st)
- Division: Bantamweight; Featherweight; Lightweight
- Reach: 72.0 in (183 cm)
- Fighting out of: Tucson, Arizona
- Team: APEX MMA
- Years active: 2006–2017

Mixed martial arts record
- Total: 29
- Wins: 15
- By knockout: 4
- By submission: 4
- By decision: 7
- Losses: 13
- By knockout: 5
- By submission: 4
- By decision: 4
- Draws: 1

Other information
- Mixed martial arts record from Sherdog

George H. Roop (born November 10, 1981) is a retired mixed martial artist. He was a cast member of Spike TV's The Ultimate Fighter: Team Nogueira vs. Team Mir, winning his preliminary and first round fights. He fought as a bantamweight in the UFC and most recently fought under the Road FC banner. He holds notable victories over former WEC Bantamweight champion Brian Bowles and UFC featherweight contender Chan Sung Jung.

== Background ==
Roop is from Tucson, Arizona and began competing in martial arts from a young age, winning Tae Kwon Do and judo tournaments while following the UFC in its early days. He later attended Canyon Del Oro High School, where he was a quarterback on the football team and participated in wrestling in the 112 lbs. division, and had also wrestled in middle school. He attended Pima Community College but elected not to wrestle. He met former UFC fighters Drew Fickett and Efraín Escudero while attending PCC.

== Mixed martial arts ==
Roop developed his mixed martial skills at The Ultima Martial Arts and Primero Jiu-Jitsu in Tucson, Arizona. Roop's main experience comes from fighting in an Arizona-based promotion, Rage in the Cage, where he was the featherweight champion. He has fought as a lightweight, featherweight and bantamweight.

Roop was originally a fighter for the team, The Ultima Martial Arts. When the Ultimate Fighter ended, Roop moved out to Las Vegas, Nevada and began his training with Xtreme Couture. After Shawn Tompkins left Xtreme Couture, Roop followed him and started fighting for Team Tompkins. Now, he fights out of APEX MMA in Tucson, AZ.

=== The Ultimate Fighter ===
Roop defeated Rolando Delgado by decision in the preliminary round. This meant that he earned a shot in the TUF house. Roop was selected last overall in the team selections, by Team Mir. George's fight with John Polakowski was the last lightweight, first round fight. Right before the fight Roop broke his hand, during his team's practice. Roop won the fight by decision after two rounds. Frank Mir said it was the fight of the show. While Dana White stated "Sometimes fights that need a third round don't make it, even when they should."

In the semi-finals, Roop fought Phillipe Nover and lost in round one by submission.

=== Ultimate Fighting Championship ===
Roop lost his UFC debut against former The Ultimate Fighter: Team Nogueira vs. Team Mir castmate Shane Nelson. Roop lost the fight via split decision. Roop had his next fight at UFC 98: Evans vs. Machida where he defeated Dave Kaplan via split decision.

In his third UFC fight, Roop stepped in on very short notice to take on George Sotiropoulos at UFC 101. Roop lost the fight in the second round after Sotiropoulos applied a kimura forcing Roop to tap instantly. Roop was let go, along with Thales Leites and Tamdan McCrory, after going 1-2 in the promotion.

=== After release from the UFC ===
After being released from the Ultimate Fighting Championships, Roop returned to the Rage in the Cage promotion to fight Matt Dell for the featherweight title. The fight took place on November 14 with Roop winning all three rounds on every judges scorecard to capture the title.

=== World Extreme Cagefighting ===
Roop was signed by the WEC after going only 1-0 since being released from the UFC. He was set to make his debut against Jesse Moreng on January 10, 2010 at WEC 46, but Moreng was forced off the card with an injury. Roop instead went down two weight classes to bantamweight and faced Eddie Wineland. Wineland defeated Roop via unanimous decision.

Roop faced Leonard Garcia on March 6, 2010 at WEC 47 after he replaced Diego Nunes who was forced off the card with an injury. The bout ended in a rare split draw but earned Fight of the Night honors.

Roop next faced Chan Sung Jung on September 30, 2010 at WEC 51. A significant underdog going into the fight, Roop won via KO due to a vicious head kick to the chin in the second round, earning him the Knockout of the Night bonus and giving Jung his first ever stoppage loss.

=== Return to Ultimate Fighting Championship ===
On October 28, 2010, World Extreme Cagefighting merged with the Ultimate Fighting Championship. As part of the merger, all WEC fighters were transferred to the UFC.

Roop fought former Team Tompkins teammate & training partner, Mark Hominick on January 22, 2011 at UFC: Fight For The Troops 2. Roop was knocked down multiple times and at just 1:28 of the first round Roop lost via TKO due to strikes.

Roop then faced Josh Grispi on June 4, 2011 at The Ultimate Fighter 13 Finale. Although the underdog, he dominated the fight and finished Grispi with a body shot for the TKO finish in the third round.

Roop faced world ranked Featherweight Hatsu Hioki on October 29, 2011 at UFC 137. Roop lost via split decision.

Roop next faced Cub Swanson on January 28, 2012 at UFC on Fox: Evans vs. Davis. He lost the fight via TKO in the second round.

Roop was expected to face Antonio Carvalho on July 21, 2012 at UFC 149. However, Roop was forced out of the bout with an injury and replaced by Daniel Pineda.

Roop was expected to return to Bantamweight and face Yuri Alcantara on January 19, 2013 at UFC on FX: Belfort vs. Bisping, replacing an injured Johnny Eduardo. However, Roop was forced out of the bout with an injury and replaced by promotional newcomer Pedro Nobre.

In his next fight, Roop faced Reuben Duran on March 16, 2013 at UFC 158. He won the fight via unanimous decision.

Roop faced Brian Bowles on May 25, 2013 at UFC 160. He won the fight via TKO in the second round.

Roop was expected to face Francisco Rivera on October 19, 2013 at UFC 166. However, the pairing was shifted to November 6, 2013 at UFC Fight Night 31. He lost the fight via TKO in the second round.

Roop faced Dustin Kimura on April 16, 2014 at The Ultimate Fighter Nations Finale. He won the fight via unanimous decision.

Roop faced promotional newcomer Rob Font on July 5, 2014 at UFC 175. He lost the fight via knockout in the first round.

Roop faced Takeya Mizugaki on September 27, 2015 at UFC Fight Night 75. He lost the fight by unanimous decision.

On February 9, 2016, Roop was released from the UFC

=== Road FC ===
Roop signed a multi-fight deal with Road FC on March 22, 2016 and made his debut in Road FC 031 on May 14, 2016. During the fight Roop attempted to strike his opponent, Yoon Jun Lee, with a front kick and suffered a broken leg resulting in a TKO loss.

== Personal life ==
Roop is the father of 6 children. The eldest child, Julian died in 2009 at the age of seven.

During his long tenure under Zuffa promotions, he reinvested his salaries into licenses for growing medical cannabis and creating a cannabis production facility in his native Tucson.

== Championships and accomplishments ==
- World Extreme Cagefighting
  - Fight of the Night (One time) vs. Leonard Garcia
  - Knockout of the Night (One time) vs. Chan Sung Jung

== Mixed martial arts record ==
Professional record breakdown
29 matches	15 wins	13 losses
By knockout	4	5
By submission	4	4
By decision	7	4
Draws	1	

Res.	Record	Opponent	Method	Event	Date	Round	Time	Location	Notes
Loss	15–13–1	Yoon Jun Lee	TKO (broken leg)	Road FC 31	May 14, 2016	1	1:15	Seoul, South Korea	
Loss	15–12–1	Takeya Mizugaki	Decision (unanimous)	UFC Fight Night: Barnett vs. Nelson	September 27, 2015	3	5:00	Saitama, Japan	
Loss	15–11–1	Rob Font	KO (punch)	UFC 175	July 5, 2014	1	2:19	Las Vegas, Nevada, United States	
Win	15–10–1	Dustin Kimura	Decision (unanimous)	The Ultimate Fighter Nations Finale: Bisping vs. Kennedy	April 16, 2014	3	5:00	Quebec City, Quebec, Canada	
Loss	14–10–1	Francisco Rivera	TKO (punches)	UFC: Fight for the Troops 3	November 6, 2013	2	2:20	Fort Campbell, Kentucky, United States	
Win	14–9–1	Brian Bowles	TKO (punches)	UFC 160	May 25, 2013	2	1:43	Las Vegas, Nevada, United States	
Win	13–9–1	Reuben Duran	Decision (unanimous)	UFC 158	March 16, 2013	3	5:00	Montreal, Quebec, Canada	Return to Bantamweight.
Loss	12–9–1	Cub Swanson	TKO (punches)	UFC on Fox: Evans vs. Davis	January 28, 2012	2	2:22	Chicago, Illinois, United States	
Loss	12–8–1	Hatsu Hioki	Decision (split)	UFC 137	October 29, 2011	3	5:00	Las Vegas, Nevada, United States	
Win	12–7–1	Josh Grispi	TKO (body punch)	The Ultimate Fighter: Team Lesnar vs. Team dos Santos Finale	June 4, 2011	3	3:14	Las Vegas, Nevada, United States	
Loss	11–7–1	Mark Hominick	TKO (punches)	UFC: Fight for the Troops 2	January 22, 2011	1	1:28	Fort Hood, Texas, United States	
Win	11–6–1	Chan Sung Jung	KO (head kick)	WEC 51	September 30, 2010	2	1:30	Broomfield, Colorado, United States	Knockout of the Night.
Draw	10–6–1	Leonard Garcia	Draw (split)	WEC 47	March 6, 2010	3	5:00	Columbus, Ohio, United States	Return to Featherweight. Fight of the Night.
Loss	10–6	Eddie Wineland	Decision (unanimous)	WEC 46	January 10, 2010	3	5:00	Sacramento, California, United States	Bantamweight debut.
Win	10–5	Matt Dell	Decision (unanimous)	Rage in the Cage 137	November 14, 2009	3	5:00	Tucson, Arizona, United States	Featherweight debut.
Loss	9–5	George Sotiropoulos	Submission (kimura)	UFC 101	August 8, 2009	2	1:59	Philadelphia, Pennsylvania, United States	
Win	9–4	Dave Kaplan	Decision (split)	UFC 98	May 23, 2009	3	5:00	Las Vegas, Nevada, United States	
Loss	8–4	Shane Nelson	Decision (split)	The Ultimate Fighter: Team Nogueira vs. Team Mir Finale	December 13, 2008	3	5:00	Las Vegas, Nevada, United States	
Win	8–3	Nick Buschman	TKO (punches)	WFC: Armageddon	March 12, 2008	1	0:24	Denver, Colorado, United States	
Win	7–3	Tito Jones	Decision (unanimous)	Rage in the Cage 101	October 6, 2007	3	3:00	Fountain Hills, Arizona, United States	
Win	6–3	Andrew Belvado	Submission (rear-naked choke)	Cage Supremacy 2	July 22, 2007	1	1:01	Tucson, Arizona, United States	
Loss	5–3	Austin Pascucci	Submission (armbar)	Rage in the Cage 96	June 15, 2007	1	2:08	Tucson, Arizona, United States	
Loss	5–2	Ray Robinson	Submission (armbar)	Rage in the Cage 93	March 20, 2007	1	2:29	Phoenix, Arizona, United States	
Win	5–1	Matt Dell	Decision (split)	Rage in the Cage 91	February 24, 2007	3	3:00	Phoenix, Arizona, United States	
Win	4–1	Carlos Ortega	Decision (unanimous)	Rage in the Cage 88	November 11, 2006	3	3:00	Tucson, Arizona, United States	
Win	3–1	Louie Rosa	Submission (punches)	Rage in the Cage 86	August 15, 2006	2	2:15	San Carlos, Arizona, United States	
Loss	2–1	Nick Hedrick	Submission (guillotine choke)	Rage in the Cage 85	August 5, 2006	1	1:42	Phoenix, Arizona, United States	
Win	2–0	Jason Sterling	Submission (rear-naked choke)	Rage in the Cage 84	July 1, 2006	1	0:37	Phoenix, Arizona, United States	
Win	1–0	Austin Pascucci	Submission (armbar)	Rage in the Cage 82	May 26, 2006	2	2:42	Tucson, Arizona, United States	

== See also ==
- List of current UFC fighters
- List of male mixed martial artists
