= Pima Community College =

Public college in Pima County, Arizona, US

Coordinates: 32°13′37″N 111°01′05″W

- Type: Public community college
- Established: 1969; 57 years ago
- Academic affiliations: Space-grant
- Chancellor: Jeffrey P. Nasse
- Faculty: 239 full-time, 505 part-time instructional and educational support faculty
- Students: 17,739
- Location: Tucson, Arizona, US
- Campus: Five campuses, four education centers
- Colors: Orange, blue, and white
- Nickname: Aztecs
- Website: www.pima.edu

Pima Community College (PCC) is a public community college in Tucson, Arizona, United States. It serves the Tucson metropolitan area with a community college district consisting of five campuses, four education centers, and several adult education learning centers. It provides traditional and online instruction for over 144 programs. The college also offers workforce training, non-credit personal interest classes and post-baccalaureate certificates. PCC is one of the largest multi-campus community colleges in the United States, with a relative ranking varying between fourth and tenth largest. PCC is accredited by the Higher Learning Commission.

== History ==
Voters in Pima County approved the creation of a junior college district in 1966 and the first classes were held in 1969 at a temporary campus in an airplane hangar at the Tucson International Airport, Tucson Medical Center, Villa Maria, and Marana. The college was originally named Pima College, but the name was changed to Pima Community College in 1972 to better reflect the mission of the college.

In 2008, PCC's board of governors began receiving anonymous complaints of sexual harassment by PCC chancellor Roy Flores. The board took no formal action until 2011 and Flores resigned in 2012 citing health problems. The search for his replacement had been troubled. In February 2013, PCC discovered that the search consultant failed to disclose an issue with a finalist for the job; the consultant was fired and the job search extended.

One month after the chancellor search was extended, the interim chancellor resigned in the wake of a scathing report issued by PCC's regional accreditor, the Higher Learning Commission (HLC). The report documented not only the ignored complaints of sexual harassment but also a hostile work environment and numerous administrative and financial problems. The report discussed problems with admissions standards which PCC changed in 2011, problems the college has admitted. As a result of the problems Pima had been on probation with the HLC; however, on February 26, 2015, the probation was rescinded. Pima was placed "On Notice" for deficiencies. That was removed in February 2017 and the college has been fully accredited since then.

PCC also received media attention in early 2011 for being the former school of 2011 Tucson shooting perpetrator Jared Lee Loughner. While he was at PCC, some of his teachers complained to the administration about his disruptions and bizarre behavior, as they thought them a sign of mental illness and feared what he might do. The college suspended Loughner.

== Campuses and learning centers ==
The original campus for Pima College was located at the site which is now the West Campus. Before the campus opened, classes were taught at a variety of locations around Tucson. From 1971 to the present, the college district has expanded to meet the growing educational needs of the Tucson area. The campuses and learning center provides traditional classroom, distance learning, and hands-on learning opportunities. There are six campuses in the Tucson metropolitan area:

- Community campus (closed in 2019)
- Desert Vista campus
- Downtown campus
- East campus
- Northwest campus
- West campus

Additionally, there are four Learning/Education Centers:

- Davis-Monthan Air Force Base Education Center
- Green Valley Community Learning Center
- Northeast Education Center (closed in 2011)
- Southeast Education Center

=== Community campus ===
The Pima Community College Community campus was opened in 1975 to meet non-traditional educational needs, including distance learning, non-degree activity classes, and adult education. In 1997, the campus moved to Bonita Avenue and Commerce Park Loop, near St. Mary's Road and Interstate 10. The campus was home to the teacher education program. Many of its services were moved to the Northwest, West, and Downtown campuses when the PCC Community campus was closed in 2019.

=== Desert Vista campus ===
First established as the South Education Center in 1986, the Desert Vista campus moved to its present location in 1993. The campus is located at Valencia Viejo, a site once occupied by the Hohokam people, between Irvington Road and Valencia Road on Calle Santa Cruz, west of Interstate 19. The campus supports the nearby Aviation Technology Center at Tucson International Airport and supplies workforce training to the business community at the Center for Training and Development.

=== Downtown campus ===
Opened in 1974, the Downtown Campus is situated between Speedway Blvd. and Drachman Street on Stone Avenue, close to downtown Tucson and east of Interstate 10. It has traditional academic, occupational, technical, and trade programs. In 2018, the historic Tucson Inn was purchased by the district and added to the campus.

=== East campus ===
In 1976, the college established the East Learning Center, which became East campus in 1981 with the construction of a new facility located on 58 acres (23 ha) of land at Irvington Road and Fred Enke Drive, near Davis-Monthan Air Force Base. Its programs include veterinary technology and emergency medical technology.

The College East Campus Observatory was established in 1989 by Professor David G. Iadevaia. It includes the Pima College – East Campus observatory and teaching planetarium. After many years in temporary, makeshift facilities, the observatory has a permanent home which was designed by Iadevaia. The observatory is an important part of astronomy education, not only for registered students but also for the public.

=== Northwest campus ===
In 2003, the Northwest Community Learning Center (established in 1998) became the Northwest campus, the newest PCC campus. The 50-acre (20 ha) campus is located on Shannon Road, between Ina and Magee roads in north Tucson. The campus is home to the hotel/restaurant management and therapeutic massage programs.

=== West campus ===
The oldest Pima Community College campus, West campus is located on 267 acres (108.1 ha) of land between Anklam Road and Speedway Blvd., west of Interstate 10. The campus was opened in 1970. Facilities located at West Campus include the Center for Archaeological Field Training, the Center for the Arts in addition to the offices of The Pima Post newspaper and Cababi literary magazine. The campus is home to the college's programs in health-related professions. West Campus is home to Sand Script, a student literary magazine.

=== Learning centers ===
The learning centers provide administrative functions and teach classes and these centers are:

- Davis-Monthan Air Force Base Education Center, meeting the needs of active duty military at Davis-Monthan Air Force Base and members of the general public.
- Green Valley Community Learning Center, south of Tucson along Interstate 19, serving the community in Green Valley, Arizona.

Adult learning centers for basic education, ESOL instruction, citizenship classes, and GED preparation are at these locations:

- Eastside Learning Center on south Alvernon Way
- El Pueblo Liberty Learning Center on Irvington Road, east of Interstate 19
- El Rio Learning Center on west Speedway Boulevard
- Lindsey Center on south Third Avenue

=== Partnership with the Catholic University of America ===
In 2019, a partnership with the Catholic University of America in Washington, D.C. was announced whereby students could earn an associate degree from Pima and a bachelor's degree in business management from CUA. The program is administered by CUA's Metropolitan School of Professional Studies and taught by professors at CUA's Busch School of Business.

Under the program, first year students enter Pima and take a blend of courses from the two institutions, including foundational courses in philosophy and theology. Over the course of the program, two-thirds of courses will be taken remotely and one-third will be taken in dedicated space on the Pima campus. Between 20 and 25 students will initially be admitted to the program, which has a total four year cost of $32,000, far less than the cost of in-state tuition at a four-year Arizona public college. At the time of launch, it was hoped to grow the program to include 100 students per cohort in three years. Financial aid is available through both institutions. Local businesses in Tucson are involved in fundraising to support the program.

The Catholic University of America's officials recognized that most Hispanics in the United States are Catholics but historically have not had access to Catholic higher education in their areas. An analysis by CUA found that of "the 25 U.S. cities with the largest total increases in the Hispanic population, nine have no Catholic college or university in close proximity." In 2017, CUA began exploring partnerships with existing institutions in the Southwest instead of opening a new campus. Several cities with large populations of Hispanics and Catholics were considered when then-Tucson Mayor Jonathan Rothschild heard of CUA's desire to open a satellite campus. He called the university's provost and then connected the provost with the bishop and over 300 local business leaders and other members of the community.

The two colleges worked with local business leaders and with Education Design Lab and Extension Engine to develop the curriculum for the program. Local business leaders serve as adjunct professors. The program is for first generation Americans and other under-represented socio-economic groups.

== Organization and administration ==
PCC is governed by a five-member board of governors, whose members serve six-year elected terms. Board members are elected based on county electoral district.

== Governance and leadership ==
The governing board of the Pima County Community College District has five members elected by the voters from geographical districts within Pima County. The chancellor of PCC serves as its chief executive officer with each campus led by a president and each administrative area run by a vice chancellor.

== Academics ==
PCC offers many community-related programs to support the needs of the Tucson metropolitan area. It provides GED and adult literacy classes, art and theater, senior facilities, and summer camps. PCC has an extensive small-business development center.

PCC is accredited by the Higher Learning Commission of the North Central Association of Colleges and Schools. Additionally, many medical programs including nursing or veterinary technology have additional specialized accreditation by the Arizona and United States Departments of Education. PCC's Aviation Technology Program, through Davis-Monthan Air Force Base, is approved by the Federal Aviation Administration.

Pima Community College hosts the Aztec Middle College, a program operated by the Tucson Unified School District; it offers credit recovery and concurrent earning of high school and college credits to older students on four Pima College campuses.

=== Degrees and certificates ===
PCC awards these degrees:

- Associate of Arts (AA)
- Associate of Business (AB)
- Associate of Science (AS)
- Associate of Fine Arts (AFA)
- Associate of Applied Arts (AAA)
- Associate of General Studies (AGS)

It also awards certificates in many disciplines.

=== AGEC ===
In 1999, Arizona approved the Arizona General Education Curriculum (AGEC) for students transferring from an Arizona community college to one of the three state universities. A 35-credit block of general education courses, the AGEC transfers to the state universities (and some other baccalaureate degree granting institutions) to meet their lower division general education requirements. PCC awards the AGEC-A, AGEC-B, and AGEC-S certificates.

== Student life ==
=== Student publications ===
Pima Post
- Type: Student news media
- Format: Digital
- Publisher: Pima Community College, Journalism Program
- Staff writers: Students at Pima Community College
- Founded: 1973
- Language: English
- Headquarters: West Campus, Pima Community College; Tucson, Arizona
- Website: www.pimapost.com

The Pima Post is the student newspaper of Pima Community College. It was created in the 1970s as the Campus News (1973 to 1977), then named the Aztec Campus News (1977–1978), the Aztec News (1978–1981), and the Aztec Press (1982–2021), before becoming the Pima Post in 2021.

The Pima Post is now a student-run online news service. It covers all six campuses of Pima Community College with its news service. Print circulation was 5,000 copies of bi-weekly editions until 2020, when the publication moved to online-only media distribution.

The Post was named a national finalist by the Society of Professional Journalists for best all-around two-year college newspaper.

SandScript is a literary magazine. The publication has won the Best Overall Publication, Southwest Division, from the Community College Humanities Association, most recently in 2013.

=== Other programs ===
- Army ROTC
- Performing arts (theater, music, and art)
- Student government
- Honors program
- Phi Theta Kappa honors society

=== Athletics ===
PCC sponsors fifteen intercollegiate sports teams for men and women. Pima's teams are nicknamed the Aztecs.

==== Fall sports ====
- Men's cross country
- Women's cross country
- Men's soccer
- Women's soccer
- Women's volleyball

==== Winter sports ====
- Men's basketball
- Women's basketball

==== Spring sports ====
- Baseball
- Men's golf
- Women's golf
- Softball
- Men's tennis
- Women's tennis
- Men's track and field
- Women's track and field

== Notable people ==
- Gabriella Cázares-Kelly, educator, community organizer, and politician
- Warren Faidley, storm chaser
- Jared Lee Loughner, perpetrator of the 2011 Tucson shooting (did not graduate)
- Ned Norris Jr., former chairman of the Tohono Oʼodham Nation
- Nick Young, actor

=== Athletes ===
- Abdi Abdirahman, Olympic long-distance runner
- D. J. Carrasco, Major League Baseball pitcher
- Erubiel Durazo, MLB player
- Shinsaku Enomoto, professional basketball player in Japan
- Horacio Llamas, National Basketball Association player with the Phoenix Suns, also played professionally in Mexico
- Shakir Smith, professional basketball player in Oman
- Donald Toia, Major League Soccer player
- Minh Vu, professional USL player

==== Mixed martial artists ====
- Seth Baczynski, professional mixed martial artist, 10x veteran of the UFC, and contestant for The Ultimate Fighter 11 and The Ultimate Fighter 25
- Anthony Birchak, professional mixed martial artist, 4x veteran of the UFC, and current color commentator for Rizin Fighting Federation
- Dominick Cruz, professional mixed martial artist, 7x veteran of the UFC, and the former 2x UFC bantamweight champion, as well as the final WEC bantamweight champion
- Efraín Escudero, NJCAA All-American wrestler; professional mixed martial artist, winner of The Ultimate Fighter 8, and 12x veteran of the UFC
- Drew Fickett, professional mixed martial artist, and 7x veteran of the UFC
- Jesse Forbes, NJCAA All-American wrestler; mixed martial artist, contestant on The Ultimate Fighter 2, and 3x veteran of the UFC
- Chad Griggs, professional mixed martial artist, and 2x veteran of the UFC
- Rich Hale, professional mixed martial artist, and 2x Bellator MMA tournament runner-up
- Danny Martinez, professional mixed martial artist, and 4x veteran of the UFC
- George Roop, professional mixed martial artist, contestant for The Ultimate Fighter 8, and 13x veteran of the UFC
- James Terry, professional mixed martial artist, Strikeforce & Bellator MMA veteran
- Jamie Varner, NJCAA All-American wrestler; retired professional mixed martial artist, 10x veteran of the UFC, and former WEC Lightweight Champion
- Ed West, professional mixed martial artist, and Bellator MMA veteran
