= Israel FC: Genesis =

Israel FC MMA events in 2010

- The poster for Israel FC: Genesis
- Promotion: Israel FC
- Date: November 9, 2010
- Venue: Nokia Arena
- City: Tel Aviv, Israel
- Attendance: 7,000

Israel FC: Genesis was a mixed martial arts event held by the Israel FC promotion on November 9, 2010 at the Nokia Arena in Tel Aviv, Israel. This was Israel FC's first event and featured multiple UFC veterans. It was also announced that this would be the last fight for Shonie Carter.

The event was aired on PPV via gofightlive.tv for $9.99. Lenne Hardt was the announcer for the event.

== Official fight card ==
=== Results ===
Main card
Weight class				Method	Round	Time	Notes
Catchweight (215 lb)	(United States) Ricco Rodriguez	def.	(Spain) Daniel Tabera	Decision (unanimous)	3	5:00
Heavyweight	(United States) Jeff Monson	def.	(Russia) Sergey Shemetov	Submission (kimura)	1	4:09
Catchweight (181 lb)	(United States) Frank Trigg	def.	(Israel) Roy Neeman	TKO (punches	1	2:36
Lightweight	(Brazil) Hermes Franca	def.	(Israel) Moishe Katz	Decision (unanimous)	3	5:00
Light Heavyweight	(Cameroon) Rameau Thierry Sokoudjou	def.	(Lithuania) Valdas Pocevicius	Decision (unanimous)	3	5:00
Undercard
Weight class				Method	Round	Time	Notes
Light Heavyweight	(Brazil) Daniel Gracie	def.	(Sweden) Martin Wojcik	Submission (rear-naked choke)	1	2:17
Catchweight (176 lb)	(United States) Shonie Carter	def.	(Israel) Jeremy Knafo	Decision (unanimous)	3	5:00	(Note: Shonie Carter announced retirement post-fight.)
Light Heavyweight	(Brazil) Alexandro Ceconi	def.	(Russia) Vitaly Shemetov	Submission (triangle choke)	1	4:48
Lightweight	(Brazil) Thiago Meller	def.	(Israel) Ariel Abergel	Submission (armbar)	1	0:35
Lightweight	(Israel) Vitali Krbrsky	def.	(Armenia) Serob Minasyan	Decision(unanimous)	3	5:00
Lightweight	(Israel) Ido Pariente	def.	(United States) Joshua Hewlett	Submission (armbar)	1	2:54
Lightweight	(Israel) Roy Peretez	def.	(France) Fabrice Riconneau	Submission (triangle choke)	1	3:00
