= Phillipe Nover =

American mixed martial arts fighter

- Born: February 3, 1984 (age 42); Brooklyn, New York, United States
- Other names: Super
- Height: 5 ft 9 in (1.75 m)
- Weight: 145 lb (66 kg; 10.4 st)
- Division: Featherweight
- Reach: 72 in (183 cm)
- Style: Brazilian Jiu-Jitsu, Muay Thai, Jeet Kune Do, Wrestling
- Fighting out of: Brooklyn, New York
- Team: Renzo Gracie, Edge Hoboken, Church Street Boxing
- Rank: Black belt in Brazilian Jiu-Jitsu under Alexandre "Soca" Freita
- Years active: 2003–2017

Mixed martial arts record
- Total: 20
- Wins: 11
- By knockout: 1
- By submission: 5
- By decision: 5
- Losses: 8
- By knockout: 1
- By decision: 7
- Draws: 1

Other information
- Mixed martial arts record from Sherdog

Phillipe J. Nover (born February 3, 1984) is an American retired mixed martial artist. He is best known for making it to the finals of The Ultimate Fighter: Team Nogueira vs. Team Mir. He is a former Ring of Combat lightweight champion.

== Early life and career ==
Nover was born and raised in Brooklyn. His father is American, and his mother is from Quezon City. He trained with Sifu Ralph Mitchell at Universal Defense Systems which covers Kali, Yaw-Yan, Muay Thai, Savate, Boxing, Judo, Kung Fu, Wrestling, Brazilian Jiu-Jitsu, and Jeet Kune Do. He began training in martial arts at age ten and attended The Leon M. Goldstein High School for the Sciences.

He attended Kingsborough Community College and works in a Brooklyn hospital as a registered nurse. Phillipe completed his bachelor's degree at SUNY Downstate Medical Center. Nover holds a black belt in Brazilian Jiu-Jitsu under Alexander "Soca" Freitas. Nover trains at Renzo Gracie Academy in New York City, Edge Wrestling in New Jersey, and Church Street Boxing gym in Tribeca New York under his striking trainer Jason Strout.

=== The Ultimate Fighter ===
Nover normally fought as a welterweight but since The Ultimate Fighter: Team Nogueira vs. Team Mir only had an opening for lightweights and light-heavyweights he had to cut weight to be able to participate. Dana White called him "Fainting Phillipe" because he had fainted when White was announcing the coaches. In the preliminary round, Nover defeated Joe Duarte with a rear naked choke in the second round. In episode 8, Nover defeated Dave Kaplan, again via rear naked choke then proclaimed himself as the toughest registered nurse on the planet. In the same episode Dana White mentioned that Nover reminds him of a young Georges St-Pierre. Nover defeated George Roop in the semi-finals via a kimura lock but ultimately lost in the Ultimate Fighter Finale on December 13, 2008, to Efraín Escudero via unanimous decision.

=== Ultimate Fighting Championship ===
Phillipe Nover fought Kyle Bradley at UFC 98, losing via a controversial TKO at 1:03 of the first round. After taking down Nover, Bradley landed some heavy punches on his prone opponent. Nover was pulling guard ready to defend, however Referee Yves Lavigne stopped the fight. Lavigne was booed by the crowd for the remainder of the event.

Phillipe Nover was set to fight Sam Stout at UFC Fight Night 19, replacing the injured Kyle Bradley. On September 16, 2009, the day of the fight, Nover had fainted. As a result, the match with Stout was cancelled.

Nover then faced a fellow Ultimate Fighter alumni Rob Emerson at UFC 109 on February 6, 2010. Nover lost a controversial unanimous decision. Sherdog.com scored the bout 29–28 in favor of Nover. With a UFC record of 0–3, he was released from the promotion.

=== Post-UFC ===
After being released from the UFC, Nover continued to train MMA in New York and teach at a local mixed martial arts school. Nover took a year off from competing to focus on his coaching and nursing careers. He had a few Muay Thai matches before returning to compete in MMA. He returned to the cage after an 18-month layoff to meet Jake Murphy, a Greg Jackson-trained fighter, at Hoosier Fight Club 8 on August 20, 2011. He replaced the last man to defeat him, Murphy's original opponent, Rob Emerson, who had to pull out of the fight due to injury. Nover won the fight by unanimous decision, 29–28 on all three judges' scorecards.

=== Bellator Fighting Championships ===
A few weeks after his win over Murphy, Nover was signed to fight in Bellator Fighting Championships. His debut came at Bellator 59 against Polish submission ace, Marcin Held. Nover lost the fight via a controversial split decision. During the bout, Nover was able to dominate on the stand-up and maintain top position on the ground as well as display strong submission defense. However, two of the three judges scored for Held's multiple submission attempts. Sherdog.com scored the bout 29–28 in favor of Nover.

Nover faced Derrick Kennington on September 28, 2012, at Bellator 74. He won the fight via submission in the second round. In his third fight for the promotion, Nover faced Darrell Horcher at Bellator 95 on April 4, 2013. He won the fight via unanimous decision.

=== Return to UFC ===
After five years away from the organization, Nover made his return to the UFC when he faced Yui Chul Nam in a featherweight bout on May 16, 2015, at UFC Fight Night: Edgar vs. Faber. He won the fight via split decision.

Nover next faced Zubaira Tukhugov on December 10, 2015, at UFC Fight Night 80. He lost the fight via split decision.

Nover faced Renan Barão on September 24, 2016, at UFC Fight Night 95. He lost the fight via unanimous decision.

Nover faced Ricky Glenn on February 11, 2017, at UFC 208. He lost the back-and-forth fight via split decision.

On February 15, 2017, Nover announced his retirement from mixed martial arts.

== Brazilian Jiu-jitsu ==
Before his fight with Efraín Escudero, Phillipe was awarded a black belt in Brazilian Jiu-Jitsu by Alexandre "Soca" Freitas on Dec. 6, 2008. The ceremony took place at the Soca Brazilian Jiu-Jitsu Academy in New York. Phillipe has been studying BJJ since he was 17 years old. Nover faced his Ultimate Fighter Season 8 finale opponent Escudero in a submission-only match on November 9, 2013, at the World Jiu-Jitsu Expo; they fought to a draw. In his next match-up, a wrestling match at Grapple at the Garden on December 1, 2013, he was defeated by former UFC lightweight champion Frankie Edgar.

Nover announced that he became a third degree black belt in January 2020.

=== Instructor lineage ===
Mitsuyo "Count Koma" Maeda → Carlos Gracie Sr. → Helio Gracie → Carlos Gracie Jr. → Alexandre Freitas → Phillipe Nover

== Retirement ==
Nover is a cardiac nurse in Brooklyn.

== Championships and Accomplishments ==
- Ring of Combat
  - ROC Lightweight Championship (One time, Vacated)

== Mixed martial arts record ==
Professional record breakdown
20 matches	11 wins	8 losses
By knockout	1	1
By submission	5	0
By decision	5	7
Draws	1	

Res.	Record	Opponent	Method	Event	Date	Round	Time	Location	Notes
Loss	11–8–1	Ricky Glenn	Decision (split)	UFC 208	February 11, 2017	3	5:00	Brooklyn, New York, United States	
Loss	11–7–1	Renan Barão	Decision (unanimous)	UFC Fight Night: Cyborg vs. Länsberg	September 24, 2016	3	5:00	Brasília, Brazil	
Loss	11–6–1	Zubaira Tukhugov	Decision (split)	UFC Fight Night: Namajunas vs. VanZant	December 10, 2015	3	5:00	Las Vegas, Nevada, United States	
Win	11–5–1	Yui Chul Nam	Decision (split)	UFC Fight Night: Edgar vs. Faber	May 16, 2015	3	5:00	Pasay, Philippines	Featherweight debut.
Win	10–5–1	Dan Cion	Submission (rear-naked choke)	Ring of Combat 50	January 23, 2015	2	1:10	Atlantic City, New Jersey, United States	
Win	9–5–1	Mike Santiago	Decision (unanimous)	Ring of Combat 45	June 14, 2013	3	5:00	Atlantic City, New Jersey, United States	Won the Ring of Combat Lightweight Championship.
Win	8–5–1	Darrell Horcher	Decision (unanimous)	Bellator 95	April 4, 2013	3	5:00	Atlantic City, New Jersey, United States	
Loss	7–5–1	Anthony Rocco Martin	Decision (majority)	Dakota FC 14	January 27, 2013	3	5:00	Fargo, North Dakota, United States	
Win	7–4–1	Derrick Kennington	Submission (rear-naked choke)	Bellator 74	September 28, 2012	2	4:20	Atlantic City, New Jersey, United States	
Loss	6–4–1	Marcin Held	Decision (split)	Bellator 59	November 26, 2011	3	5:00	Atlantic City, New Jersey, United States	
Win	6–3–1	Jake Murphy	Decision (unanimous)	Hoosier Fight Club 8	August 20, 2011	3	5:00	Valparaiso, Indiana, United States	
Loss	5–3–1	Rob Emerson	Decision (unanimous)	UFC 109	February 6, 2010	3	5:00	Las Vegas, Nevada, United States	
Loss	5–2–1	Kyle Bradley	TKO (punches)	UFC 98	May 23, 2009	1	1:03	Las Vegas, Nevada, United States	
Loss	5–1–1	Efraín Escudero	Decision (unanimous)	The Ultimate Fighter: Team Nogueira vs. Team Mir Finale	December 13, 2008	3	5:00	Las Vegas, Nevada, United States	The Ultimate Fighter 8 Lightweight Tournament Final.
Win	5–0–1	Jay Coleman	Submission (kimura)	Ring of Combat 13	March 16, 2007	1	3:00	Atlantic City, New Jersey, United States	
Win	4–0–1	Abner Lloveras	Decision (majority)	Ring of Combat 12	November 17, 2006	2	5:00	Atlantic City, New Jersey, United States	
Win	3–0–1	Dave Drago	Submission (rear-naked choke)	Ring of Combat 11	August 18, 2006	1	1:58	Atlantic City, New Jersey, United States	
Win	2–0–1	Michael McQuade	KO (punches)	Ring of Combat 9	October 29, 2005	1	0:16	Asbury Park, New Jersey, United States	
Draw	1–0–1	Jason Dublin	Draw	CZ 7: Gravel Pit	July 10, 2004	2	5:00	Revere, Massachusetts, United States	
Win	1–0	Ron Stallings	Submission (guillotine choke)	RF 4: Reality Fighting 4	July 19, 2003	1	0:43	Bayonne, New Jersey, United States	

=== Exhibition record ===
Professional record breakdown
3 matches	3 wins	0 losses
By submission	3	0

Res.	Record	Opponent	Method	Event	Date	Round	Time	Location	Notes
Win	3–0	George Roop	Submission (kimura)	The Ultimate Fighter: Team Nogueira vs. Team Mir Episode-12	June 2008	1	2:28	Las Vegas, Nevada, United States	Became TUF 8: Finalist
Win	2–0	Dave Kaplan	Submission (rear-naked choke)	The Ultimate Fighter: Team Nogueira vs. Team Mir Episode-8	June 2008	1	1:58	Las Vegas, Nevada, United States	
Win	1–0	Joe Duarte	Submission (rear-naked choke)	The Ultimate Fighter: Team Nogueira vs. Team Mir Episode-1	May 2008	2	1:52	Las Vegas, Nevada, United States	

== See also ==
- List of current UFC fighters
- List of male mixed martial artists
