= Shane Nelson (fighter) =

American mixed martial arts fighter

- Born: November 29, 1984 (age 41); Honolulu, Hawaii, United States
- Other names: Sugar
- Height: 5 ft 9 in (1.75 m)
- Weight: 146 lb (66 kg; 10.4 st)
- Division: Featherweight; Lightweight
- Reach: 70 in (180 cm)
- Stance: Southpaw
- Fighting out of: Hilo, Hawaii
- Team: BJ Penn's MMA
- Rank: purple belt in Brazilian jiu-jitsu
- Years active: 2004-present

Mixed martial arts record
- Total: 23
- Wins: 16
- By knockout: 4
- By submission: 4
- By decision: 8
- Losses: 7
- By submission: 1
- By decision: 6

Other information
- Website: http://www.sugarshanenelson.com/
- Mixed martial arts record from Sherdog

Shane Nelson (born November 29, 1984) is an American mixed martial artist. He was a cast member of SpikeTV's The Ultimate Fighter: Team Nogueira vs. Team Mir. In addition to the UFC, Nelson has also competed for the MFC, Shooto, and Shark Fights.

== Mixed martial arts career ==
For the last six years, Nelson has trained with former UFC Lightweight Champion B.J. Penn. Nelson has worked in construction, and now trains full-time with Troy Mandaloniz and Kendall Grove.

=== The Ultimate Fighter ===
Nelson earned a spot in the house by defeating Charles Diaz via decision after two rounds. Later on, the fighters were given the opportunity to watch UFC 84 on TV. While watching, Junie Browning and Shane began drinking. The pair soon became belligerent and started to throw things into the pool and attempted to pick fights with the other fighters. The next day, UFC President Dana White came to the house and expressed his displeasure with the Nelson and Browning's actions. He announced his decision to give them a second chance and did not kick them off of the show. White then spoke to the coaches to ensure that Nelson would be in the first Lightweight fight. Efraín Escudero defeated Shane in the second round with a head triangle.

=== Ultimate Fighting Championship ===
Nelson won his UFC debut against former The Ultimate Fighter: Team Nogueira vs. Team Mir castmate George Roop. Nelson won the fight via split decision.

Nelson had his second fight in the UFC defeating Aaron Riley at UFC 96, Nelson won via TKO 44 seconds into the first round. The stoppage is being called one of the worst in UFC history. Nelson was later defeated by Riley via unanimous decision in a rematch at UFC 101.

Nelson was released from the UFC after losing to Matt Wiman via unanimous decision at UFC 107.

=== DREAM ===
Nelson was set to fight Shinya Aoki on very short notice at DREAM. Fight for Japan!. However, Aoki declined to fight Nelson, and he was replaced by Rich Clementi.

== Personal life ==
Nelson has a son.

== Championships and accomplishments ==
- Ultimate Fighting Championship
  - UFC.com Awards
    - 2009: Ranked #3 Upset of the Year vs. Aaron Riley 1

== Mixed martial arts record ==
Professional record breakdown
23 matches	16 wins	7 losses
By knockout	4	0
By submission	4	1
By decision	8	6

Res.	Record	Opponent	Method	Event	Date	Round	Time	Location	Notes
Win	16–7	Kaleo Kwan	Decision (majority)	RWE - Just Scrap	June 21, 2014	3	5:00	Hilo, Hawaii, United States	
Loss	15–7	Graham Spencer	Decision (unanimous)	MFC 35	October 26, 2012	3	5:00	Edmonton, Alberta, Canada	
Loss	15–6	Takasuke Kume	Submission (rear-naked choke)	Shooto: Gig Central 24: Love and Courage	February 12, 2012	2	1:54	Nagoya, Aichi, Japan	
Win	15–5	Lance Wipf	TKO (injury)	Superior Cage Combat 3	November 4, 2011	2	2:15	Las Vegas, Nevada, United States	
Win	14–5	Aaron Wetherspoon	TKO (doctor stoppage)	Shark Fights 18	August 19, 2011	2	1:33	Sparks, Nevada, United States	
Win	13–5	Jai Bradney	Submission (guillotine choke)	Nitro 2: Throwdown	March 20, 2011	2	2:06	Logan City, Queensland, Australia	
Loss	12–5	Matt Wiman	Decision (unanimous)	UFC 107	December 12, 2009	3	5:00	Memphis, Tennessee, United States	
Loss	12–4	Aaron Riley	Decision (unanimous)	UFC 101	August 8, 2009	3	5:00	Philadelphia, Pennsylvania, United States	
Win	12–3	Aaron Riley	TKO (punch)	UFC 96	March 7, 2009	1	0:44	Columbus, Ohio, United States	
Win	11–3	George Roop	Decision (split)	TUF 8 Finale	December 13, 2008	3	5:00	Las Vegas, Nevada, United States	
Win	10–3	Kaleo Kwan	Decision (split)	X-1 Events: Champions	January 26, 2008	3	5:00	Honolulu, Hawaii, United States	
Win	9–3	Harris Sarmiento	Decision (unanimous)	Gracie Proving Ground	October 6, 2007	3	5:00	Honolulu, Hawaii, United States	
Win	8–3	Mike Cuban	TKO (strikes)	Rumbling on the Rocks: Beatdown 4	July 14, 2007	1	N/A	Hawaii, United States	
Win	7–3	Kolo Koka	Decision (unanimous)	X-1: Extreme Fighting 2	March 17, 2007	3	5:00	Honolulu, Hawaii, United States	
Win	6–3	Aleka Rincon	Decision (unanimous)	Rumbling on the Rocks: Beatdown 2	October 21, 2006	3	5:00	Hilo, Hawaii, United States	
Win	5–3	Tyler Kahihikolo	Decision (unanimous)	Rumbling on the Rocks: Beatdown 1	June 17, 2006	3	5:00	Hawaii, United States	
Loss	4–3	Jamal Perkins	Decision (unanimous)	Extreme Wars 2: X-1	March 18, 2006	3	3:00	Honolulu, Hawaii, United States	
Win	4–2	Isaac Kuikahi	Submission (choke)	Rumbling on the Rocks: Just Scrap	November 5, 2005	1	3:09	Hilo, Hawaii, United States	
Loss	3–2	Robert Villapondo	Decision (majority)	Rumbling on the Rocks: Showdown in Maui	October 7, 2005	2	5:00	Maui, Hawaii, United States	
Loss	3–1	Harris Sarmiento	Decision (unanimous)	Rumbling on the Rocks: Proving Grounds II	July 9, 2005	2	5:00	Hilo, Hawaii, United States	
Win	3–0	Kaleo Kwan	Decision (majority)	Punishment in Paradise 9	January 22, 2005	2	5:00	Hawaii, United States	
Win	2–0	Duke Sarigosa	Submission (strikes)	Rumbling on the Rocks: Proving Grounds I	September 18, 2004	1	N/A	Kona, Hawaii, United States	
Win	1–0	Wayne Salazar	Submission (guillotine choke)	You Think You're Tough 5	August 28, 2004	1	2:29	Kona, Hawaii, United States	
