= Aaron Riley =

American mixed martial arts fighter

- Born: December 9, 1980 (age 45); Tell City, Indiana, U.S.
- Height: 5 ft 9 in (1.75 m)
- Weight: 155 lb (70 kg; 11.1 st)
- Division: Lightweight; Welterweight
- Reach: 69 in (175 cm)
- Style: Boxing, Wrestling, Judo, Taekwondo
- Stance: Southpaw
- Fighting out of: Albuquerque, New Mexico, United States
- Team: Jackson's Submission Fighting; American Top Team (formerly)
- Years active: 1997–2013

Mixed martial arts record
- Total: 45
- Wins: 30
- By knockout: 10
- By submission: 9
- By decision: 11
- Losses: 14
- By knockout: 7
- By submission: 2
- By decision: 5
- Draws: 1

Other information
- Mixed martial arts record from Sherdog

Aaron Riley (born December 9, 1980) is a retired American mixed martial artist who most recently competed in the Lightweight division of the Ultimate Fighting Championship. A professional competitor from 1997 to 2013, he has also formerly competed in PRIDE, the IFL, Shooto, and BodogFIGHT. Aside from mixed martial arts, Riley has also competed in boxing (becoming a Golden Gloves champion) and wrestling.

== Background ==
Riley was born and raised in Tell City, Indiana. Growing up, he watched the UFC since its first event in 1993, and fell in love with the sport of mixed martial arts. Riley competed in boxing, winning a Golden Gloves Championship, and also competed in wrestling for three years at Tell City High School.

== Mixed martial arts career ==
=== Early career ===
Riley made his professional debut in 1997 at the age of 16 for the HOOKnSHOOT organization. He received his first career loss in his second fight via kneebar, and then won ten consecutive fights. Riley then lost two consecutive fights against future UFC veterans Yves Edwards and Falaniko Vitale.

=== Ultimate Fighting Championship ===
Riley made his UFC debut against future EliteXC Middleweight Champion and UFC Welterweight Champion Robbie Lawler at UFC 37. Riley lost the fight via unanimous decision. Four years later, he fought again for the organization against Spencer Fisher at UFC Fight Night 3, and lost via TKO.

=== Pride Fighting Championships, BodogFIGHT, and the IFL ===
Riley made his PRIDE debut at PRIDE Bushido 7 against Michihiro Omigawa, who was making his mixed martial arts debut. Riley was successful in his first and only fight with the Japanese organization, winning via head kick knockout in the first round.

Riley then participated in two bouts for the BodogFIGHT organization. His first fight was in Costa Rica, which he won via armbar and then fought against future Bellator Lightweight Champion Eddie Alvarez, but lost via knockout.

In Riley's next fight, he debuted in the International Fight League against Ryan Schultz, who was the last IFL Lightweight Champion. Riley lost the fight via unanimous decision.

=== Return to the UFC ===
Riley returned to the UFC on November 15, 2008, at UFC 91 against Jorge Gurgel. Aaron beat Gurgel by unanimous decision, winning a $60,000 Fight of the Night honor award.

Riley next faced TUF 8 cast member Shane Nelson at UFC 96, losing via controversial first round TKO.

A rematch with Nelson was scheduled immediately, for UFC 101, which Riley won via unanimous decision (30–27, 30–27, 30–27).

At UFC 105 he was defeated by TUF winner Ross Pearson via TKO in the second round after a flying knee by Pearson opened up several cuts on Riley's face. Doctors viewed the cuts on Riley's face, and came to the conclusion that he was unable to continue.

Riley then rebounded with a unanimous decision win over Joe Brammer on May 29, 2010, at UFC 114.

Riley was expected to face UFC newcomer Pat Audinwood on September 25, 2010, at UFC 119, but Riley was forced from the card with an injury and replaced by Thiago Tavares.

Riley was defeated by Tony Ferguson on September 24, 2011, at UFC 135. While the fight was competitive early, Ferguson landed a strong left uppercut, and Ferguson dominated the remaining two minutes of the round. Immediately after the end of the first round, Riley told his corner that his jaw was broken. The fight was declared a TKO victory for Ferguson, as ringside doctors would not allow Riley to continue. Riley had previously suffered a broken jaw when he fought Spencer Fisher at UFC Fight Night 3.

Riley was expected to face Cody McKenzie on May 15, 2012, at UFC on Fuel TV: Korean Zombie vs. Poirier. However, Riley was pulled from the event and replaced by promotional newcomer Marcus LeVesseur.

After nearly two years away from the sport, Riley returned to face Justin Salas on July 27, 2013, at UFC on Fox 8. He lost the back-and-forth fight by split decision. He retired from MMA following his loss to Salas.

== Championships and accomplishments ==
- Ultimate Fighting Championship
  - Fight of the Night (One time) vs. Jorge Gurgel
  - UFC Encyclopedia Awards
    - Fight of the Night (One time) vs. Robbie Lawler

== Mixed martial arts record ==
Professional record breakdown
45 matches	30 wins	14 losses
By knockout	10	7
By submission	9	2
By decision	11	5
Draws	1	

Res.	Record	Opponent	Method	Event	Date	Round	Time	Location	Notes
Loss	30–14–1	Justin Salas	Decision (split)	UFC on Fox: Johnson vs. Moraga	July 27, 2013	3	5:00	Seattle, Washington, United States	
Loss	30–13–1	Tony Ferguson	TKO (corner stoppage)	UFC 135	September 24, 2011	1	5:00	Denver, Colorado, United States	
Win	30–12–1	Joe Brammer	Decision (unanimous)	UFC 114	May 29, 2010	3	5:00	Las Vegas, Nevada, United States	
Loss	29–12–1	Ross Pearson	TKO (doctor stoppage)	UFC 105	November 14, 2009	2	4:34	Manchester, England	
Win	29–11–1	Shane Nelson	Decision (unanimous)	UFC 101	August 8, 2009	3	5:00	Philadelphia, Pennsylvania, United States	
Loss	28–11–1	Shane Nelson	TKO (punches)	UFC 96	March 7, 2009	1	0:44	Columbus, Ohio, United States	
Win	28–10–1	Jorge Gurgel	Decision (unanimous)	UFC 91	November 15, 2008	3	5:00	Las Vegas, Nevada, United States	Fight of the Night
Win	27–10–1	Steve Claveau	Decision (unanimous)	Xtreme MMA 5	September 13, 2008	3	5:00	Montreal, Quebec, Canada	
Win	26–10–1	Thiago Meller	Decision (unanimous)	UWC: Invasion	April 26, 2008	3	5:00	Fairfax, Virginia, United States	
Loss	25–10–1	Ryan Schultz	Decision (unanimous)	IFL: 2007 Team Championship Final	September 20, 2007	3	4:00	Hollywood, Florida, United States	
Loss	25–9–1	Eddie Alvarez	KO (punches)	BodogFIGHT: USA vs Russia	December 2, 2006	1	1:05	Vancouver, British Columbia, Canada	For BodogFIGHT Welterweight Championship
Win	25–8–1	Darrell Smith	Submission (armbar)	BodogFIGHT: To the Brink of War	August 22, 2006	2	2:40	Costa Rica	
Loss	25–8–1	Spencer Fisher	TKO (doctor stoppage)	UFC Fight Night 3	January 16, 2006	1	5:00	Las Vegas, Nevada, United States	
Win	24–7–1	Michihiro Omigawa	KO (head kick)	PRIDE Bushido 7	May 22, 2005	1	6:00	Tokyo, Japan	
Win	23–7–1	Andrew Chappelle	Decision	HOOKnSHOOT: Arnold Classic	March 4, 2005	3	5:00	Columbus, Ohio, United States	
Win	22–7–1	Maicon Alarcao	TKO (injury)	AFC: Brazil 1	August 28, 2004	1	4:10	Rio de Janeiro, Brazil	
Win	21–7–1	Nuri Shakir	Decision (unanimous)	HOOKnSHOOT: Live	March 27, 2004	3	5:00	Evansville, Indiana, United States	
Loss	20–7–1	Sam Morgan	Submission (armbar)	Shooto USA – Warrior Spirit: Evolution	November 14, 2003	1	2:41	Las Vegas, Nevada, United States	
Win	20–6–1	Cedric Marks	Submission (armbar)	Combate Extremo	August 30, 2003	1	1:40	New Mexico	
Win	19–6–1	Nick Gilardi	TKO (submission to punches)	PPKA: Ultimate Fight Night	June 28, 2003	2	1:49	Yakima, Washington, United States	
Loss	18–6–1	Chris Lytle	KO (punch)	HOOKnSHOOT: Boot Camp 1.1	March 8, 2003	1	3:31	Evansville, Indiana, United States	
Win	18–5–1	Alexandre Barros	Decision (unanimous)	HOOKnSHOOT: Absolute Fighting Championships 1	December 13, 2002	3	5:00	Ft. Lauderdale, Florida, United States	
Loss	17–5–1	Robbie Lawler	Decision (unanimous)	UFC 37	May 10, 2002	3	5:00	Bossier City, Louisiana, United States	
Win	17–4–1	Mike Willus	TKO (strikes)	HOOKnSHOOT: Kings 1	November 17, 2001	1	N/A	Evansville, Indiana, United States	
Loss	16–4–1	Yves Edwards	Decision (unanimous)	HOOKnSHOOT: Showdown	July 14, 2001	3	5:00	Evansville, Indiana, United States	
Win	16–3–1	Earl Thompson	Submission (armbar)	UFCF: War 2001	April 21, 2001	1	2:08	Kirkland, Washington, United States	
Win	15–3–1	Steve Berger	Decision (unanimous)	HOOKnSHOOT: Triumph	August 19, 2000	3	5:00	Evansville, Indiana, United States	
Win	14–3–1	Aaron Stregles	KO (punches)	Talon Challenge 2	July 14, 2000	1	N/A	Harlingen, Texas, United States	
Win	13–3–1	Jeremy Bennett	KO (punches)	HOOKnSHOOT: Double Fury 1	March 17, 2000	1	N/A	United States	
Win	12–3–1	Colin O'Rourke	Decision (majority)	WEF 8: Goin' Platinum	January 15, 2000	3	4:00	Rome, Georgia, United States	
Loss	11–3–1	Falaniko Vitale	TKO (punches)	RITC 2: Marching of the Warriors	October 15, 1999	1	7:06	Honolulu, Hawaii, United States	
Loss	11–2–1	Yves Edwards	Decision	HOOKnSHOOT: Texas Heat	October 2, 1999	1	20:00	Texas, United States	
Win	11–1–1	Joe Merit	Submission (armbar)	Lionheart Invitational	September 1, 1999	1	2:24	Georgia, United States	
Draw	10–1–1	CJ Fernandes	Draw	Submission Fighting Championships 8	August 7, 1999	1	15:00	Belleville, Illinois, United States	
Win	10–1	Billy Johnson	TKO (submission to punches)	HOOKnSHOOT: Breakout	July 24, 1999	1	2:10	Evansville, Indiana, United States	
Win	9–1	Rob Tallack	TKO (punches)	Kakidamisi 1: Samurai Challenge	July 11, 1999	1	2:52	United States	
Win	8–1	Tony Apponte	TKO (submission to punches)	Extreme Shootout	June 25, 1999	1	7:31	McAllen, Texas, United States	
Win	7–1	James Julian	Submission (armbar)	Submission Fighting Championships 6	April 30, 1999	1	N/A	O'Fallon, Illinois, United States	
Win	6–1	Shane Garrett	Decision (unanimous)	HOOKnSHOOT: Horizon	March 20, 1999	1	20:00	Evansville, Indiana, United States	
Win	5–1	Phil Stroffolino	TKO (submission to punches)	HOOKnSHOOT: Eruption	November 7, 1998	1	3:27	Evansville, Indiana, United States	
Win	4–1	Brian Boclair	Submission (armbar)	HOOKnSHOOT: Quest	August 14, 1998	1	1:35	United States	
Win	3–1	Chris Mounce	Submission (keylock)	HOOKnSHOOT: N-Vision	June 12, 1998	N/A	N/A	United States	
Win	2–1	Billy Johnson	Submission (armbar)	HOOKnSHOOT: Elite	September 20, 1997	1	5:08	Indiana, United States	
Loss	1–1	Mario Roberto	Submission (kneebar)	HOOKnSHOOT: When Worlds Collide	July 18, 1997	N/A	N/A	United States	
Win	1–0	Chris Malgieri	Submission (heel hook)	HOOKnSHOOT: When Worlds Collide	July 18, 1997	N/A	N/A	United States	
