= Dustin Hazelett =

American mixed martial arts fighter

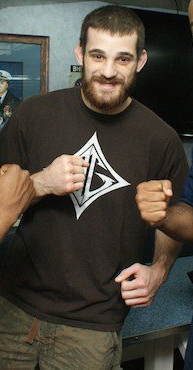
- Born: April 29, 1986 (age 40); Louisa, Kentucky, United States
- Other names: McLovin
- Height: 6 ft 1 in (1.85 m)
- Weight: 155 lb (70 kg; 11.1 st)
- Division: Lightweight (155 lb); Welterweight (170 lb)
- Reach: 77.0 in (196 cm)
- Fighting out of: Cincinnati, Ohio, United States
- Team: The JG MMA and Fitness Academy
- Rank: Black belt in Brazilian jiu-jitsu
- Years active: 2004–2010

Mixed martial arts record
- Total: 19
- Wins: 12
- By knockout: 1
- By submission: 9
- By decision: 2
- Losses: 7
- By knockout: 4
- By submission: 2
- By decision: 1

Other information
- Mixed martial arts record from Sherdog

Dustin Tyler Hazelett (born April 29, 1986) is a retired American mixed martial artist who had fought as a Welterweight in the Ultimate Fighting Championship.

== Background ==
Hazelett was born in Louisa, Kentucky, USA. Hazelett began training in martial arts as a sophomore in high school and began training Brazilian jiu-jitsu at the age of 16, going on to earn a black belt under Jorge Gurgel. Hazelett has attended Marshall University, and is in progress to earning his bachelor's degree.

== Mixed martial arts career ==
=== Early career ===
Hazelett made his professional mixed martial arts debut in 2004 and compiled a record of 10–2 before being signed by the UFC.

=== Ultimate Fighting Championship ===
Hazelett made his UFC debut on October 10, 2006, in a submission loss to Tony DeSouza. Hazelett holds notable wins over Josh Burkman via step-over armbar, transitioned from a whizzer takedown at The Ultimate Fighter 7 Finale and Tamdan McCrory due to a reverse armbar at UFC 91. Each spectacular finish earned Hazelett the Submission of the Night award. His impressive submission victory over Josh Burkman earned Hazelett the "Submission of the Year" award from ESPN partner, Sherdog.com. His next fight was expected to be against Ben Saunders at UFC 96, but had to withdraw due to injury. He was expected to make his return against Karo Parisyan on November 21, 2009, at UFC 106. However, the fight was cancelled after Karo Parisyan bowed out of the match the day before weigh-ins. Dana White stated on his Twitter page that Hazelett would be paid both his fight and win bonuses for the fight.

Hazelett would later agree to face Paul Daley at UFC 108 following Carlos Condit's withdrawal. However, Hazelett lost the fight via first-round knockout and was medically suspended shortly after because of an orbital bone injury.

Hazelett was scheduled to make his return against Dan Hardy at UFC 119 after verbal agreements were made. However, Hazelett withdrew from the bout as he was due to get married in September. Hazelett faced Rick Story on August 7, 2010, at UFC 117. Hazelett lost to Story by TKO (punches) at 1:15 of the second round.

Hazelett was unsuccessful in his bid when he dropped to Lightweight when he faced Mark Bocek on December 11, 2010, at UFC 124, losing via triangle choke in the 1st round. On December 20 Hazelett was released by the UFC following a three-fight losing streak.

Hazelett has temporarily put a hold to his MMA career to go back to school.

== Personal life ==
Hazelett and his wife had their first child in 2011. Since his UFC career Dustin has become a full time paramedic in Cabell County WV.

== Championships and accomplishments ==
=== Mixed martial arts ===
- Ultimate Fighting Championship
  - Fight of the Night (One time) vs. Josh Burkman
  - Submission of the Night (Three times) vs. Jonathan Goulet, Josh Burkman, Tamdan McCrory
  - UFC.com Awards
    - 2008: Submission of the Year vs. Josh Burkman & Ranked #10 Submission of the Year vs. Tamdan McCrory
- Sports Illustrated
  - 2008 Submission of the Year vs. Josh Burkman at The Ultimate Fighter: Team Rampage vs. Team Forrest
- MMA Fighting
  - 2008 UFC Submission of the Year vs. Josh Burkman at The Ultimate Fighter: Team Rampage vs. Team Forrest
  - 2008 #9 Ranked UFC Submission of the Year vs. Tamdan McCrory at UFC 91

== Mixed martial arts record ==
Professional record breakdown
19 matches	12 wins	7 losses
By knockout	1	4
By submission	9	2
By decision	2	1

Res.	Record	Opponent	Method	Event	Date	Round	Time	Location	Notes
Loss	12–7	Mark Bocek	Submission (triangle choke/armbar)	UFC 124	December 11, 2010	1	2:33	Montreal, Quebec, Canada	Return to Lightweight
Loss	12–6	Rick Story	TKO (punches)	UFC 117	August 7, 2010	2	1:15	Oakland, California, United States	
Loss	12–5	Paul Daley	KO (punches)	UFC 108	January 2, 2010	1	2:24	Las Vegas, Nevada, United States	Catchweight bout of 172 lbs
Win	12–4	Tamdan McCrory	Submission (reverse armbar)	UFC 91	November 15, 2008	1	3:59	Las Vegas, Nevada, United States	Submission of the Night
Win	11–4	Josh Burkman	Submission (armbar)	The Ultimate Fighter: Team Rampage vs. Team Forrest Finale	June 21, 2008	2	4:46	Las Vegas, Nevada, United States	Fight of the Night; Submission of the Night; Submission of the Year
Loss	10–4	Josh Koscheck	KO (head kick and punches)	UFC 82	March 1, 2008	2	1:24	Columbus, Ohio, United States	
Win	10–3	Jonathan Goulet	Submission (armbar)	UFC Fight Night: Thomas vs. Florian	September 19, 2007	1	1:14	Las Vegas, Nevada, United States	Submission of the Night
Win	9–3	Stevie Lynch	Submission (anaconda choke)	UFC 72	June 16, 2007	1	2:50	Belfast, Northern Ireland	
Win	8–3	Diego Saraiva	Decision (unanimous)	UFC 67	February 3, 2007	3	5:00	Las Vegas, Nevada, United States	Lightweight bout
Loss	7–3	Tony DeSouza	Submission (kimura)	Ortiz vs. Shamrock 3: The Final Chapter	October 10, 2006	1	3:59	Hollywood, Florida, United States	
Win	7–2	Chad Reiner	KO (punches)	Extreme Challenge 70	August 26, 2006	1	0:07	Hayward, Wisconsin, United States	
Win	6–2	Victor Moreno	Submission (armbar)	Extreme Challenge 68	July 15, 2006	1	1:02	Hayward, Wisconsin, United States	
Win	5–2	Mike Cardosa	Submission (triangle choke)	Extreme Challenge 68	July 15, 2006	1	0:48	Hayward, Wisconsin, United States	
Win	4–2	Rhalan Gracie	Decision (split)	GFC: Team Gracie vs Team Hammer House	March 3, 2006	3	5:00	Columbus, Ohio, United States	
Loss	3–2	Dereck Keasley	Decision (unanimous)	Freestyle Fighting Championship 16	September 24, 2005	2	5:00	Tunica, Mississippi, United States	
Win	3–1	John Shackelford	Submission (rear-naked choke)	Freestyle Fighting Championship 16	September 24, 2005	1	2:42	Tunica, Mississippi, United States	
Loss	2–1	Junior Assuncao	TKO (punches)	Full Throttle 3	July 15, 2005	1	4:27	Duluth, Georgia, United States	
Win	2–0	Jason Ireland	Submission (triangle choke)	Hand 2 Hand Combat	June 17, 2005	1	N/A	Canton, Ohio, United States	
Win	1–0	Justin Hons	Submission (armbar)	KOTC 42: Buckeye Nuts	October 23, 2004	1	N/A	Dayton, Ohio, United States	

== See also ==
- List of male mixed martial artists
