= David G. Iadevaia =

American astronomer

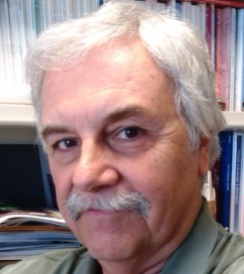
Prof. David G. Iadevaia, Tucson AZ 2011

David G. Iadevaia was born in Providence, Rhode Island on 7 September 1949. He retired in 2013 as professor of astronomy and physics from Pima College - East Campus in Tucson, Arizona. He has been at Pima since his hire in 1983. He is also the author of a science fiction novel Of Stranger Things as well as author of various articles about science education. He established the first online astronomy course with real time telescope observations. This was published in T.H.E. Journal, January 1999.

He is a member of the American Astronomical Society, a member of the Planetary Division, as well as the HAD (History of Astronomy Division). As a ham radio operator, KF7MZY, Professor Iadevaia is active in NASA Space Grant education program for grade school to university students dealing with near space, high-altitude balloon experiments and is a member of the Arizona Near Space Research organization. His current research is with UAVs in both fixed wing and multi-rotor devices.

Professor Iadevaia was also an adjunct professor for Walden University from 2006 to 2010. He remains an advocate for maintaining high academic and scientific standards in online courses and degree programs.

A pilot and former aircraft owner, he likes to say that he traded his horizontal wings for vertical wings. He also writes about sailing and is an avid sailor. Professor Iadevaia uses his Catalina 36 sloop, S/V Principessa, to conduct research in physics of sailing, underwater imaging, Remote Operated Vehicles (ROVs) and marine solar electric systems from Mission Bay in San Diego.

Professor Iadevaia shares his results with students and the public using various online resources.

== Sources ==
- http://ftp.aas.org/had/hadnews/HADN43.pdf%5B%5D
- http://ecc.pima.edu/~diadevaia
- http://www.amazon.com/s?ie=UTF8&keywords=Of%20Stranger%20Things%20David%20G.%20Iadevaia&index=books&page=1
- https://web.archive.org/web/20100721005431/http://iraf.noao.edu/iraf/ftp/iraf/conf/adass-91/final.mailing/attlis.txt
- http://ecc.pima.edu/~diadevaia/page8a.html
- http://www.sailingmagazine.net/how-to/technique/620-celestial-navigation-
- https://eric.ed.gov/?id=ED514027
- http://www.davidiadevaia.com
- http://www.snopes.com
