= UFC 96 =

UFC mixed martial arts event in 2009

UFC 96: Jackson vs. Jardine
- The poster for UFC 96: Jackson vs. Jardine
- Promotion: Ultimate Fighting Championship
- Date: March 7, 2009
- Venue: Nationwide Arena
- City: Columbus, Ohio
- Attendance: 17,033
- Total gate: $1,800,000
- Buyrate: 350,000
- Total purse: $762,000

Event chronology
UFC 95: Sanchez vs. Stevenson	UFC 96: Jackson vs. Jardine	UFC Fight Night: Condit vs. Kampmann

UFC 96: Jackson vs. Jardine was a mixed martial arts event held by the Ultimate Fighting Championship (UFC). It was held in Columbus, Ohio, on March 7, 2009, at Nationwide Arena.

== Background ==
The card was headlined by a Light Heavyweight bout between Quinton Jackson and Keith Jardine. Following the main event, Rashad Evans, training partner of Jardine and then-Light Heavyweight Champion, entered the cage and publicly challenged Jackson. It resulted in a long-standing feud between the two that would not be settled until 2010.

A Welterweight bout between Dustin Hazelett and Ben Saunders was originally scheduled for this card, but was cancelled when Hazelett was injured.

Saunders was then scheduled to face replacement Ryan Madigan, but that bout was also cancelled when Saunders suffered a shattered toe in training. Madigan eventually faced Tamdan McCrory on this card.

== Results ==
Main card (PPV)
Weight class				Method	Round	Time	Notes
Light Heavyweight	Quinton Jackson	def.	Keith Jardine	Decision (unanimous) (29–28, 29–28, 30–27)	3	5:00
Heavyweight	Shane Carwin	def.	Gabriel Gonzaga	KO (punch)	1	1:09
Welterweight	Matt Brown	def.	Pete Sell	TKO (punches)	1	1:32
Light Heavyweight	Matt Hamill	def.	Mark Muñoz	KO (head kick)	1	3:53
Lightweight	Gray Maynard	def.	Jim Miller	Decision (unanimous) (30–27, 30–27, 30–27)	3	5:00
Preliminary card
Welterweight	Tamdan McCrory	def.	Ryan Madigan	TKO (punches)	1	3:35
Middleweight	Kendall Grove	def.	Jason Day	TKO (punches and elbows)	1	1:32
Light Heavyweight	Jason Brilz	def.	Tim Boetsch	Decision (unanimous) (29–28, 29–28, 29–28)	3	5:00
Light Heavyweight	Brandon Vera	def.	Michael Patt	TKO (leg kicks)	2	1:27
Lightweight	Shane Nelson	def.	Aaron Riley	TKO (punches)	1	0:44

== Bonus awards ==
The following fighters received $60,000 bonuses.

- Fight of the Night: Quinton Jackson vs. Keith Jardine
- Knockout of the Night: Matt Hamill
- Submission of the Night: No bonus awarded.

== Purses ==
- Quinton Jackson ($325,000 – includes $100,000 win bonus) def. Keith Jardine ($55,000)
- Shane Carwin ($32,000 – includes $16,000 win bonus) def. Gabriel Gonzaga ($60,000)
- Matt Brown ($16,000 – includes $8,000 win bonus) def. Pete Sell ($12,000)
- Matt Hamill ($40,000 – includes $20,000 win bonus) def. Mark Muñoz ($12,000)
- Gray Maynard ($20,000 – includes $10,000 win bonus) def. Jim Miller ($9,000)
- Tamdan McCrory ($20,000 – includes $10,000 win bonus) def. Ryan Madigan ($3,000)
- Kendall Grove ($44,000 – includes $22,000 win bonus) def. Jason Day ($5,000)
- Jason Brilz ($10,000 – includes $5,000 win bonus) def. Tim Boetsch ($12,000)
- Brandon Vera ($60,000 – includes $30,000 win bonus) def. Michael Patt ($5,000)
- Shane Nelson ($16,000 – includes $8,000 win bonus) def. Aaron Riley ($6,000)

== See also ==
- Ultimate Fighting Championship
- List of UFC champions
- List of UFC events
- 2009 in UFC
