= Ido Pariente =

Israeli mixed martial arts fighter

- Born: עידו פריינטה; August 31, 1978 (age 48); Tel Aviv, Israel
- Other names: "The Hebrew Hammer"
- Nationality: Israeli
- Height: 5 ft 8 in (1.73 m)
- Weight: 155 lb (70 kg; 11.1 st)
- Division: Welterweight; Lightweight
- Stance: Orthodox
- Fighting out of: Israel
- Rank: Third degree Black belt in Brazilian Jiu-Jitsu
- Years active: 2000-2012

Mixed martial arts record
- Total: 18
- Wins: 12
- By knockout: 3
- By submission: 5
- By decision: 3
- Unknown: 1
- Losses: 6
- By knockout: 4
- By submission: 1
- By decision: 1

Other information
- Mixed martial arts record from Sherdog

Ido Pariente (Hebrew: עידו פריינטה; born August 31, 1978) is an Israeli mixed martial arts fighter and trainer. His nickname is "The Hebrew Hammer". He is one of Israel's top fighters.

Pariente was the Victory Fighting Championship Lightweight Champion in 2001, Pankration World Champion in 2003, European Brazilian Jiu-Jitsu (BJJ) champion brown belt in 2007, and Desert Combat Lightweight titleholder in 2007. The Jerusalem Post described him and his brother Roy as "pretty much the biggest names in Israel's young MMA scene."

== Early life and education ==
Pariente was born in Tel Aviv, Israel on August 31, 1978. He fought karate from the age of 7 until he was 17. He is a BJJ second-degree black belt, and as of 2010 he had been fighting professionally for over 10 years.

He has a younger and bigger brother, Roy. The Jerusalem Post described him and his brother as "pretty much the biggest names in Israel's young MMA scene."

== Mixed martial arts career ==
In 1999, Pariente went to the United States to train and fight for two years. He trains full-time, mostly in Israel under Muay Thai coach Itzik Franko and one month a year in Brazil, while teaching BJJ at a 100-student school that he has named MMA Israel. Pariente fights out of an Orthodox stance. He is reputed to have good Muay Thai skills.

Pariente was the Victory Fighting Championship Lightweight Champion in 2001, Pankration World Champion in 2003, European BJJ champion brown belt in 2007, and Desert Combat Lightweight titleholder in 2007. In Desert Combat 5 in 2007, he fought with his brother on the same card for the first time.

As of 2007, he was fighting as much as he could outside of Israel, for the higher purses and greater exposure, noting that: "Every fight I get to do abroad is half conniving, half begging. It's a way of developing the sport here, too." He was at the same time earning money by training over 70 students, and overseeing a few clubs.

Pariente met Jake Shields (17–4–1) in a welterweight fight at the Fighting and Entertainment Group (FEG)/Elite Xtreme Combat (EliteXC) Dynamite!! USA event held June 2, 2007 held at the Los Angeles Coliseum, and televised on Showtime.

Shields was Fighters.com's third-ranked welterweight and later EliteXC champion; Pariente was a lightweight. Pariente had accepted the fight before realizing that Shields fought at the higher welterweight weight, but when he questioned the arrangement he was told, "It's this fight or no fight". Pariente responded, "Well, it's K-1 Dynamite, of course I'm fighting." He said, "This is a great opportunity for me. I plan to take advantage of it".

However, Shields, from San Francisco, defeated Pariente in the main event of the K-1 competition. He dominated early, getting the mount position following a quick takedown, and when Pariente gave up his back Shields defeated Pariente at 2:06 of the first round on a submission tapout by rear naked choke. Shields won $24,000 for the fight, while Pariente received $2,500. Walla! in Israel described it as one of the biggest fights ever for an Israeli, and called Pariente's fight an important milestone in the development of the fight industry in Israel.

In October 2007, Pariente defeated Romanian Gica Apostu to retain the Desert Combat title, winning Desert Combat V. He fought at 85 kg, for Team Franko, coached by Yitzhak Franko.

Pariente was a lightweight participant in 2008 on Spike TV's The Ultimate Fighter: Team Nogueira vs. Team Mir, but was eliminated in season 8 by Efraín Escudero, The Ultimate Fighter lightweight winner of the season. Escudero started the fight quickly, scoring with shots to Pariente's body, and then slowed the pace down. Pariente got a trip takedown using a clinch, and followed with shots to Escudero's body. Escudero kicked his way free, scored a takedown of his own, worked onto Pariente's back, and finished with a modified rear-naked choke. Pariente said later that TUF 8 had been his dream for a long time, and the loss was very hard on him mentally.

Speaking about mixed martial arts fighting in 2010, Pariente said that MMA demands "strength, athleticism, flexibility and more balance than in any other sport", and that in contrast to those who view the sport as overly violent, "You can't call a sport in which the competitors are under close medical supervision and need a license to compete barbaric. It's not what people think. It's not just about people fighting in a cage. This is a serious sport". Pariente had a record of 8–4 as of February 2010.

On November 9, 2010, he fought Josh Hewlett of San Francisco, a former wrestler and football player, in Israel FC: Genesis. The MMA event was held in front of a boisterous crowd of 6,500 people at Nokia Arena in the Tel Aviv neighborhood of Yad Eliahu on pay-per-view available worldwide, and was slated to be the largest MMA event ever in Israel. Pariente won the lightweight bout at 2:54 of the first round by submission.

== Retirement and post-fighting career ==
His career continued through a Cage Warriors event in 2012. His final match in Israel, an MMA match in the Hadar Yosef neighborhood of Tel Aviv was broadcast on Israeli television on June 20, 2012.

He returned to fight in the Abu Dhabi Combat Club (ADCC) Israel Open Championship in Tel Aviv in April 2014, winning the Male Super Fight 1 category.

Since retiring from fighting, Pariente has run the Pariente Academy, an MMA training school affiliated with Patrick Bittan located in Raanana.

== Mixed martial arts record ==
Professional record breakdown
18 matches	12 wins	6 losses
By knockout	3	4
By submission	5	1
By decision	4	1

Res.	Record	Opponent	Method	Event	Date	Round	Time	Location	Notes
Loss	12–6	Dale Hardiman	KO (punches)	Cage Warriors: 48	July 21, 2012	3	0:44		
Win	12–5	Chad Hinton	Decision (split)	Gladiator Cage Fights – Knockout Night 1	April 23, 2011	3	5:00		
Win	11–5	Joshua Hewlett	Submission (armbar)	Israel FC: Genesis	November 9, 2010	1	2:54		
Loss	10–5	Joshua Thorpe	KO (punches)	Empire Fighting Championships – A Night of Reckoning 2	February 27, 2010	1	3:54		
Loss	10–4	Seydina Seck	KO (punches)	Dog Fight 5	October 1, 2009	1	2:00		
Win	10–3	Keith Perkins	TKO (submission to punches)	H.B. Dick: Promotions	May 23, 2009	1	4:51		
Win	9–3	Vasile Doczi	Submission (triangle choke)	Desert Combat 6	February 29, 2008	1	1:05	Defended the Desert Combat Lightweight Championship.	
Win	8–3	Gica Apostu	Decision (unanimous)	Desert Combat 5	October 25, 2007	3	5:00	Defended the Desert Combat Lightweight Championship.	
Loss	7–3	Jake Shields	Submission (rear naked choke)	Dynamite!! USA	June 2, 2007	1	2:06	Welterweight bout.	
Win	7–2	Nardu Debrah	TKO (punches)	ROC 14: Tournament Finals	April 27, 2007	2	3:22		Catchweight (160 lb) bout.
Win	6–2	Moshe Kaitz	Decision (unanimous)	DC 3: Desert Combat 3	March 10, 2007	3	5:00		Won the vacant Desert Combat Lightweight Championship.
Loss	5–2	Johnny Frachey	Decision (unanimous)	K-1 Slovakia	February 26, 2006	3	5:00		
Win	5–1	Mindaugas Smirnovas	Submission (leglock)	Hero's Lithuania 2005	November 26, 2005	N/A	N/A	Welterweight bout.	
Win	4–1	Don Hamilton	Decision (unanimous)	Gladiators 16	June 30, 2001	3	5:00		
Win	3–1	Jason Purcell	TKO (punches)	Gladiators 14	May 11, 2001	N/A	N/A		
Loss	2–1	Aaron Jerome	TKO (punches)	Gladiators 11	December 9, 2000	1	0:53		
Win	2–0	Dylan Norris	TKO (punches)	EC 38: Extreme Challenge 38	November 16, 2000	1	0:26		
Win	1–0	Khaled Basheer	Submission (choke)	Gladiators 5: Gladiators 5	May 6, 2000	2	N/A		

== See also ==
- List of select Jewish mixed martial artists
