= UFC 101 =

UFC mixed martial arts event in 2009

UFC 101: Declaration
- The poster for UFC 101: Declaration
- Promotion: Ultimate Fighting Championship
- Date: August 8, 2009
- Venue: Wachovia Center
- City: Philadelphia, Pennsylvania
- Attendance: 17,411
- Total gate: $3,550,000
- Buyrate: 850,000

Event chronology
| UFC 100 | UFC 101: Declaration | UFC 102: Couture vs. Nogueira |

UFC 101: Declaration was a mixed martial arts pay-per-view event held by the Ultimate Fighting Championship (UFC) on August 8, 2009, in Philadelphia, Pennsylvania. It was the first UFC event held in Pennsylvania. The event featured the second title defense of Lightweight Champion B.J. Penn against Kenny Florian, and a non-title Light Heavyweight bout for Middleweight Champion Anderson Silva against former Light Heavyweight Champion Forrest Griffin.

== Background ==
A previously announced bout between Rousimar Palhares and Alessio Sakara was cancelled due to a broken leg suffered by Palhares during training. Thales Leites stepped in to face Sakara.

George Roop stepped in against George Sotiropoulos after Rob Emerson pulled out of the matchup due to a cut requiring stitches.

== Results ==
Main card
| Weight class | | | | Method | Round | Time | Notes |
|---|---|---|---|---|---|---|---|
| Lightweight | B.J. Penn (c) | def | Kenny Florian | Submission (rear-naked choke) | 4 | 3:54 | (Note: For the UFC Lightweight Championship.) |
| Light Heavyweight | Anderson Silva | def | Forrest Griffin | KO (punch) | 1 | 3:23 |
| Lightweight | Aaron Riley | def | Shane Nelson | Decision (unanimous) (30-27, 30-27, 30-27) | 3 | 5:00 | (Note: This bout, originally scheduled for the preliminary card, was moved to the main card due to time constraints.) |
| Welterweight | Johny Hendricks | def | Amir Sadollah | TKO (punches) | 1 | 0:29 |
| Middleweight | Ricardo Almeida | def | Kendall Grove | Decision (unanimous) (30-27, 30-27, 30-27) | 3 | 5:00 |
| Lightweight | Kurt Pellegrino | def | Josh Neer | Decision (unanimous) (30-27, 30-27, 30-27) | 3 | 5:00 |
Preliminary card
| Weight class | | | | Method | Round | Time | Notes |
| Welterweight | John Howard | def | Tamdan McCrory | Decision (split) (29–28, 28–29, 29–28) | 3 | 5:00 |
| Middleweight | Alessio Sakara | def | Thales Leites | Decision (split) (29–28, 27–30, 29–28) | 3 | 5:00 |
| Welterweight | Matthew Riddle | def | Dan Cramer | Decision (unanimous) (29–27, 30–26, 30–27) | 3 | 5:00 |
| Lightweight | George Sotiropoulos | def | George Roop | Submission (kimura) | 2 | 1:59 |
| Welterweight | Jesse Lennox | def | Danillo Villefort | TKO (doctor stoppage) | 3 | 3:37 |

== Bonus awards ==
The following fighters received $60,000 bonuses.

- Fight of the Night: Anderson Silva vs. Forrest Griffin
- Knockout of the Night: Anderson Silva
- Submission of the Night: B.J. Penn

== See also ==
- Ultimate Fighting Championship
- List of UFC champions
- List of UFC events
- 2009 in UFC
