= Efraín Escudero =

Mexican mixed martial arts fighter (born 1986)

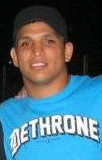
- Efraín Escudero
- Born: January 15, 1986 (age 40); San Luis Rio Colorado, Sonora, Mexico
- Other names: Hecho En México
- Height: 5 ft 9 in (175 cm)
- Weight: 155 lb (70 kg; 11.1 st)
- Division: Lightweight
- Reach: 70 in (180 cm)
- Style: Wrestling
- Fighting out of: Somerton, Arizona, U.S.
- Team: MMA Lab
- Rank: Brown belt in Brazilian Jiu-Jitsu under John Crouch
- Wrestling: NCAA wrestling
- Years active: 2006–present

Mixed martial arts record
- Total: 49
- Wins: 32
- By knockout: 2
- By submission: 16
- By decision: 14
- Losses: 17
- By knockout: 1
- By submission: 2
- By decision: 14

Other information
- University: Grand Canyon University; Pima Community College
- Notable school: Cibola High School
- Website: http://www.efrainescudero.com/
- Mixed martial arts record from Sherdog
- Last updated on: September 25, 2009

Efraín Escudero (born January 15, 1986) is a Mexican mixed martial artist who competes in the Lightweight division. He was the winner of season eight of Spike TV's reality show The Ultimate Fighter. As a result of this victory on TUF, he became the first Mexican fighter to compete within UFC.

== Mixed martial arts career ==
=== Early career ===
Escudero began his career in the summer of 2006 by putting together two back to back wins in Roland Sarria's Phoenix based Rage in the Cage mixed martial arts organization. He followed up his two fight win streak the following summer by recording 7 straight wins, all by submission. This streak of submissions was the highest recorded in the year of 2007.

Escudero only fought during the summer months because he was a full-time collegiate wrestler. He competed for Pima Community College for the 2006 and 2007 seasons. While competing Efrain found himself teammates with future UFC fighters Drew Fickett, Jamie Varner, Jesse Forbes, Anthony Birchak, George Roop, Anthony Leone, and Danny Martinez. During the 2006–2007 season, Escudero placed 7th at the NJCAA national tournament in the 157 lb weight class, officially making Escudero an All-American.

In 2007 Escudero stepped out of his summer fight schedule to compete in Full Moon Fighting's inaugural event held in Puerto Peñasco, Mexico. This was Escudero's first fight in his birth country of Mexico and he wore a pair of fight shorts bearing the Mexican Flag. This bout was against Tommy Wagner, whom he defeated by submission due to strikes at 1:12 of round 1.

=== The Ultimate Fighter 8 ===
Escudero was a contestant on the UFC's The Ultimate Fighter: Team Nogueira vs. Team Mir on Spike TV as a lightweight. He won his first fight against Ido Pariente with a rear naked choke in the first round to make it into the house. He then beat Shane Nelson in the second round with a mounted triangle to earn a spot in the semi-finals. He then beat Junie Browning with a D'Arce choke in the second round to advance to the finals. In the show's finale, shown on Spike TV, Escudero earned a six-figure UFC contract by defeating Phillipe Nover by unanimous decision. As a result of this victory, he became the first Mexican fighter to compete within UFC. Upon receiving the trophy, Escudero dedicated his win to his late father, who died just before he left for the show. He further dedicated his win to anybody who had ever lost anybody they loved.

=== Ultimate Fighting Championship ===
Escudero earned his first official win in the UFC on December 13, 2008, by defeating Phillipe Nover by unanimous decision during the main event of The Ultimate Fighter: Team Nogueira vs. Team Mir.

Efrain was set to fight Jeremy Stephens at UFC Fight Night 18. Efrain came down with a rib injury that forced him to withdraw from the bout. In an online interview, hosted by Escudero's official website, Escudero confirmed that he would fight Cole Miller at UFC 103. Prior to his fight with Miller, Efrain told FightLockdown.com, "I have been concentrating on knocking people out. My hands are improving every day. If they want to keep it standing, I am ready and willing to do just that.”

At UFC 103, in his first post-TUF fight, Escudero eventually earned an impressive KO win over Miller at 3:36 of the first round. He was aggressive throughout, once executing a powerful takedown in lifting and slamming Miller to the canvas. After dropping Miller with a strong jab, he followed up with two ground and pound strikes to the head of his opponent to stop the fight.

Escudero suffered his first professional defeat against Evan Dunham at UFC Fight Night 20 via submission in the third round. Escudero refused to tap until the armbar was at an extreme angle and left the ring under medical supervision before the victory presentation, leading to speculation that the arm was broken. Escudero reassured fans via Twitter that the arm only suffered tendon damage.

After an MRI showed that Efrain's arm was healthy, and he confirmed that he would be fighting Dan Lauzon at UFC 114.

Escudero then defeated Lauzon via unanimous decision (29–27, 29–27, 29–27) after being deducted a point late in the third round for accidentally striking Lauzon in the groin.

Escudero was expected to face John Gunderson on September 15, 2010, at UFC Fight Night 22. Escudero was then set to face Matt Wiman after Wiman's original opponent, Mac Danzig was forced from the card with an injury. Wiman also suffered an injury and was replaced by Charles Oliveira.

Escudero weighed in at 159 pounds, three pounds over the limit, resulting in the fight becoming a catchweight bout. Escudero lost the bout via submission due to a standing rear-naked choke in the third round.

On September 20, 2010, Escudero was released from his UFC contract, making him the second TUF winner to be released by the UFC.

=== Independent Promotions ===
After leaving the UFC, Escudero compiled a 5–1 record, finishing three of his opponents via submission.

Escudero's fourth fight since leaving the UFC came against fellow UFC veteran Fabrício Camões at Tachi Palace Fights 9 on May 5. He lost via unanimous decision after being controlled by Camões for the first two rounds.

Escudero was then scheduled to fight submission wizard Tim Radcliffe at BAMMA 7. However, on September 6, it was announced that visa issues prevented his travel to England.

After visa-issues forced Paul Kelly out of his fight at Legacy Fighting Championship 9, Efrain was announced as his replacement. He was signed to fight Jeff Rexroad on Dec. 16th, 2011. However, Efrain was re-signed to the UFC, causing him to withdraw from the bout.

Escudero faced Tyson Griffin at Resurrection Fighting Alliance 4 on November 2, 2012. Escudero lost via unanimous decision.

Escudero faced Bellator vet Luis Palomino at CFA 12 on October 12, 2013 Escudero won via unanimous decision.

=== Return to the UFC ===
In his UFC return, Escudero faced Jacob Volkmann on December 30, 2011, at UFC 141, replacing an injured T. J. Grant. He lost the fight via unanimous decision, but was very close to submitting Volkmann in the closing minutes.

Escudero then faced Mac Danzig on April 21, 2012, at UFC 145. Escudero lost the fight by unanimous decision and was subsequently released from the promotion for a second time.

=== Bellator MMA ===
Efrain signed a one-fight deal with Bellator Fighting Championships and fought Cesar Avila at Bellator 55. He won the fight by guillotine choke submission in the first round.

Escudero faced Zack Surdyka on September 20, 2013, at Bellator 100. He won the bout via unanimous decision.

=== Third UFC stint ===
Escudero was originally expected to face Francisco Trinaldo on September 13, 2014, at UFC Fight Night 51. However, Trinaldo was replaced in the bout by Leonardo Santos. Escudero lost the fight by unanimous decision.

Escudero faced Rodrigo de Lima on February 14, 2015, at UFC Fight Night 60. He won the fight by unanimous decision.

Escudero then faced Drew Dober at UFC 188 on June 13, 2015. He won the fight by guillotine choke submission in the first round.

Escudero faced Leandro Silva on November 21, 2015, at The Ultimate Fighter Latin America 2 Finale. He lost the fight by unanimous decision.

Escudero next faced Kevin Lee on April 23, 2016, at UFC 197. Despite Rocking Lee several times, and getting the better of the striking exchanges in each round, Efrain gave up several crucial take downs to Lee causing him to lose the fight by unanimous decision. Escudero was subsequently released from the promotion for a third time.

=== World Tour ===
Following his third release from the UFC, Escudero began competing in various international promotions. Recording decision victories in Urayasu, Chiba and Mons, Belgium.

Efrain was scheduled to compete at the O2 Arena in Prague, Czech Republic against Mansour Barnaoui (13–4) on February, 7th 2017 for EuroFC's inaugural event but the event was cancelled. The bout with Mansour was to be rescheduled to a future event, but Mansour refused for unknown reasons. Efrain instead fought against Akhmet Aliev for Fight Nights Global 59 on February 23, 2017, in Khimki, Russia. Despite almost submitting Aliev in the first round, Escudero lost a unanimous decision. When Escudero returned to the United States he quickly accepted a short notice fight against former Bellator title challenger and fellow Ultimate Fighter alumnus Fabrício Guerreiro. Escudero won the fight via unanimous decision on March 18, 2017.

Efrain was scheduled to face Bellator veteran Murad Machaev in Yekaterinburg, Russia on May 25, 2017, for Fight Nights Global 66, however, Machaev pulled out of the bout for unknown reasons. Efrain faced Akhmed Aliev on February 23, 2017, at Fight Nights Global 59 and lost that fight by split decision.

Efrain decided to give himself a quick turnaround by helping fund, and run an upstart MMA promotion based out of Mexico called Lux Fight League. On July 21, 2017, Efrain competed in the main event of the inaugural event, defeating Ultimate Fighter Brazil veteran Bruno Murata by unanimous decision, handing Murata his first professional loss in the process. Following the win Efrain began a Twitter campaign to earn a spot on the Bellator Roster.

=== Absolute Championship Berkut ===
Escudero faced Musa Khamanaev on November 18, 2017, at ACB 74. He lost the fight via unanimous decision.

Escudero was scheduled to fight Rasul Shovhalov on January 27, 2018, at ACB 79, but the fight was cancelled.

Escudero was scheduled to face Khamzat Aushev on March 24, 2018, at ACB 83, but yet again his bout was cancelled.

=== LUX Fight League ===
On July 21, 2017, Escudero was scheduled to face Bruno Murata at the inaugural event of the Mexican promotion LUX Fight League. They headlined the evening, with Escudero winning by unanimous decision.

Escudero faced Jorge López Bustamante on February 17, 2018, at LUX 002. He won the fight by submission in the first round.

=== Professional Fighters League ===
Escudero faced Jason High in a lightweight tournament bout at PFL 2 in Chicago on June 21, 2018. He won the fight via technical submission in the third round. The win was controversial as the referee stopped the bout when High quickly moved his hand under Escudero's body, resulting in the referee believing it was a tap. However, upon review of replays, it was clear High had not tapped.

Escudero was set to face Islam Mamedov in the next round of the Lightweight tournament. However, Escudero missed the 156-pound weight limit by over seven pounds, and the bout set for the PFL 5 show on August 2, 2018, was cancelled. As a result, Mamedov was awarded 3 points via walkover victory.

=== Golden Boy Promotions ===
Escudero faced Gleison Tibau in a 160lbs catchweight bout at Golden Boy Promotions inaugural MMA event on November 24, 2018. He lost the bout via unanimous decision.

== Personal life ==
Escudero was a collegiate wrestler at Grand Canyon University. Though he left the school to join the UFC, he eventually returned to earn his Bachelor of Science in criminal justice in 2011. Efrain trains under Drew Fickett.

Efrain is father of two children; a daughter born in 2012, and a son born in 2016. Efrain currently resides in Phoenix, but also has a home in his hometown of Yuma, Arizona.

== Championships and accomplishments ==
- Superior Challenge
  - SC Lightweight Championship (One time, current)
- Ultimate Fighting Championship
  - The Ultimate Fighter: Team Nogueira vs. Team Mir Lightweight Winner
  - UFC.com Awards
    - 2008: Ranked #6 Newcomer of the Year

== Mixed martial arts record ==
Professional record breakdown
49 matches	32 wins	17 losses
By knockout	2	1
By submission	16	2
By decision	14	14

Res.	Record	Opponent	Method	Event	Date	Round	Time	Location	Notes
Loss	32–17	Baissangour Chamsoudinov	TKO (punches)	Ares FC 16	June 23, 2023	2	4:42	Paris, France	Catchweight (179 lb) bout.
Win	32–16	Ricardo Chavez	Decision (unanimous)	Budo Sento Championship 11	November 4, 2022	5	5:00	Mexico City, Mexico	Welterweight debut.
Win	31–16	Leonard Smith	Submission (heel hook)	Fight Night Champions 5	November 30, 2019	2	4:22	Tijuana, Mexico	
Loss	30–16	Rasul Shovhalov	Decision (unanimous)	ACA 98	August 31, 2019	3	5:00	Krasnodar, Russia	
Loss	30–15	Amirkhan Adaev	Decision (split)	ACA 92	February 16, 2019	3	5:00	Warsaw, Poland	
Loss	30–14	Gleison Tibau	Decision (unanimous)	Golden Boy Promotions: Liddell vs. Ortiz 3	November 24, 2018	3	5:00	Inglewood, California, United States	Catchweight (160 lbs) bout
Win	30–13	Jason High	Technical Submission (guillotine choke)	PFL 2 (2018)	June 21, 2018	3	0:35	Chicago, Illinois, United States	Catchweight (162 lb) bout; Escudero missed weight.
Win	29–13	Jorge Lopez	Submission (rear-naked choke)	LUX 002	February 17, 2018	1	4:59	Mexico City, Mexico	
Loss	28–13	Musa Khamanaev	Decision (unanimous)	ACB 74	November 25, 2017	3	5:00	Vienna, Austria	
Win	28–12	Bruno Murata	Decision (unanimous)	LUX 001	July 21, 2017	3	5:00	Tampico, Mexico	
Win	27–12	Fabrício Guerreiro	Decision (unanimous)	Conquer FC 3	March 18, 2017	3	5:00	Oakland, California, United States	
Loss	26–12	Akhmet Aliev	Decision (split)	Fight Nights Global 59	February 23, 2017	3	5:00	Khimki, Russia	
Win	26–11	Nelson Carvalho	Decision (split)	European Beatdown 1	December 3, 2016	3	5:00	Mons, Belgium	
Win	25–11	Koshi Matsumoto	Decision (unanimous)	Vale Tudo Japan 8th	September 19, 2016	3	5:00	Chiba, Japan	
Loss	24–11	Kevin Lee	Decision (unanimous)	UFC 197	April 23, 2016	3	5:00	Las Vegas, Nevada, United States	
Loss	24–10	Leandro Silva	Decision (unanimous)	The Ultimate Fighter Latin America 2 Finale: Magny vs. Gastelum	November 21, 2015	3	5:00	Monterrey, Mexico	
Win	24–9	Drew Dober	Submission (guillotine choke)	UFC 188	June 13, 2015	1	0:54	Mexico City, Mexico	
Win	23–9	Rodrigo de Lima	Decision (unanimous)	UFC Fight Night: Henderson vs. Thatch	February 14, 2015	3	5:00	Broomfield, Colorado, United States	
Loss	22–9	Leonardo Santos	Decision (unanimous)	UFC Fight Night: Bigfoot vs. Arlovski	September 13, 2014	3	5:00	Brasília, Brazil	
Win	22–8	Juha-Pekka Vainikainen	TKO (elbows and punches)	Superior Challenge 10	May 3, 2014	3	4:48	Helsingborg, Sweden	Won the SC Lightweight Championship.
Loss	21–8	Dakota Cochrane	Decision (unanimous)	RFA 13	March 7, 2014	3	5:00	Lincoln, Nebraska, United States	
Win	21–7	Luis Palomino	Decision (unanimous)	CFA 12	October 12, 2013	3	5:00	Coral Gables, Florida, United States	
Win	20–7	Zack Surdyka	Decision (unanimous)	Bellator 100	September 20, 2013	3	5:00	Phoenix, Arizona, United States	
Win	19–7	Marcus Edwards	Decision (split)	Sparta Combat League: Live at the Stampede	June 29, 2013	3	5:00	Greeley, Colorado, United States	
Loss	18–7	Jorge Patino	Decision (split)	Max Sport: 13.2	May 11, 2013	3	5:00	São Paulo, Brazil	
Loss	18–6	Tyson Griffin	Decision (unanimous)	RFA 4	November 2, 2012	3	5:00	Las Vegas, Nevada, United States	
Loss	18–5	Mac Danzig	Decision (unanimous)	UFC 145	April 21, 2012	3	5:00	Atlanta, Georgia, United States	
Loss	18–4	Jacob Volkmann	Decision (unanimous)	UFC 141	December 30, 2011	3	5:00	Las Vegas, Nevada, United States	
Win	18–3	Cesar Avila	Submission (guillotine choke)	Bellator 55	October 22, 2011	1	1:55	Yuma, Arizona, United States	
Win	17–3	Mike Rio	Decision (unanimous)	CFA 2	July 23, 2011	3	5:00	Miami, Florida, United States	
Loss	16–3	Fabrício Camões	Decision (unanimous)	Tachi Palace Fights 9	May 5, 2011	3	5:00	Lemoore, California, United States	
Win	16–2	Ashe Bowman	Decision (unanimous)	XCage: Predators	April 8, 2011	3	5:00	Tijuana, Mexico	
Win	15–2	Jeremy Larsen	Submission (armbar)	Rage In The Cage 148	January 29, 2011	3	3:21	Chandler, Arizona, United States	
Win	14–2	Alfredo Martinez	Submission (rear-naked choke)	Desert Rage Full Contact Fighting 8	November 19, 2010	1	1:14	Somerton, Arizona, United States	
Loss	13–2	Charles Oliveira	Submission (rear-naked choke)	UFC Fight Night: Marquardt vs. Palhares	September 15, 2010	3	2:25	Austin, Texas, United States	Catchweight (159 lbs) bout; Escudero missed weight.
Win	13–1	Dan Lauzon	Decision (unanimous)	UFC 114	May 29, 2010	3	5:00	Las Vegas, Nevada, United States	
Loss	12–1	Evan Dunham	Submission (armbar)	UFC Fight Night: Maynard vs. Diaz	January 11, 2010	3	1:59	Fairfax, Virginia, United States	
Win	12–0	Cole Miller	KO (punches)	UFC 103	September 19, 2009	1	3:36	Dallas, Texas, United States	
Win	11–0	Phillipe Nover	Decision (unanimous)	The Ultimate Fighter: Team Nogueira vs. Team Mir Finale	December 13, 2008	3	5:00	Las Vegas, Nevada, United States	Won The Ultimate Fighter 8 Lightweight tournament.
Win	10–0	Tommy Wagner	Submission (punches)	Full Moon Fighting	February 23, 2008	1	1:12	Puerto Peñasco, Mexico	
Win	9–0	Eric Regan	Submission (rear-naked choke)	Rage in the Cage 99	August 18, 2007	2	2:15	Tucson, Arizona, United States	
Win	8–0	Jon Kecks	Submission (triangle choke)	Cage Supremacy 2	July 22, 2007	1	2:04	Tucson, Arizona, United States	
Win	7–0	TJ Zasa	Submission (rear-naked choke)	Cage Supremacy	June 24, 2007	2	0:43	Tucson, Arizona, United States	
Win	6–0	Peter Newsheller	Submission (rear-naked choke)	Rage in the Cage 96	June 15, 2007	1	1:13	Tucson, Arizona, United States	
Win	5–0	Jose Rodriguez	Submission (triangle choke)	Rage in the Cage 95	May 12, 2007	1	2:29	Fountain Hills, Arizona, United States	
Win	4–0	Nic Stone	Submission (armbar)	Rage in the Cage 93	April 20, 2007	2	1:25	Somerton, Arizona, United States	
Win	3–0	Mike Smith	Submission (rear-naked choke)	Rage in the Cage 92	March 30, 2007	1	2:57	Phoenix, Arizona, United States	
Win	2–0	Joe Cronin	Decision (unanimous)	Rage in the Cage 84	July 1, 2006	3	3:00	Phoenix, Arizona, United States	
Win	1–0	Chris Collado	Submission (choke)	Rage in the Cage 83	June 10, 2006	1	N/A	Fountain Hills, Arizona, United States	Lightweight debut.

== See also ==
- List of Bellator MMA alumni
- List of male mixed martial artists
- List of Mexican UFC fighters
