= UFC 91 =

UFC mixed martial arts event in 2008

UFC 91: Couture vs. Lesnar
- The poster for UFC 91: Couture vs. Lesnar
- Promotion: Ultimate Fighting Championship
- Date: November 15, 2008
- Venue: MGM Grand Garden Arena
- City: Las Vegas, Nevada
- Attendance: 14,272
- Total gate: $4,815,675
- Buyrate: 1,010,000
- Total purse: $1,118,000

Event chronology
UFC 90: Silva vs. Côté	UFC 91: Couture vs. Lesnar	UFC: Fight for the Troops

UFC 91: Couture vs. Lesnar was a mixed martial arts event held by the Ultimate Fighting Championship (UFC) on November 15, 2008, at the MGM Grand Garden Arena in Las Vegas, Nevada.

== Background ==
The main event featured the return of UFC Heavyweight Champion Randy Couture versus WWE's Brock Lesnar in a title bout. The decision to grant Lesnar—who was 1–1 in UFC fights at the time, and only three fights into MMA overall—the title shot was controversial at the time. Some felt it was premature and marketing driven, while others argued the relative lack of depth in the heavyweight division at the time left no clear-cut contenders to the belt.

Matthew Riddle was forced to withdraw from his bout with Ryan Thomas due to an injury. He was replaced by Matt Brown.

Amir Sadollah withdrew from his fight against Nick Catone due to a leg infection. A replacement for Sadollah could not be found, therefore the middleweight bout was pulled from the card. A welterweight match between Dustin Hazelett and Tamdan McCrory, previously scheduled for the preliminary card, was moved to the main card.

Unlike most UFC fight cards, every bout was aired on the PPV broadcast due to the quick endings of the main card bouts.

Also future Lightweight champion Rafael dos Anjos made his UFC debut at this event.

== Results ==
Main card (PPV)
Weight class				Method	Round	Time	Notes
Heavyweight	Brock Lesnar	def.	Randy Couture (c)	TKO (punches)	2	3:07	(Note: For the UFC Heavyweight Championship.)
Lightweight	Kenny Florian	def.	Joe Stevenson	Submission (rear-naked choke)	1	4:03
Welterweight	Dustin Hazelett	def.	Tamdan McCrory	Submission (armbar)	1	3:59
Heavyweight	Gabriel Gonzaga	def.	Josh Hendricks	TKO (punches)	1	1:01
Middleweight	Demian Maia	def.	Nate Quarry	Submission (rear-naked choke)	1	2:13
Preliminary card
Lightweight	Aaron Riley	def.	Jorge Gurgel	Decision (unanimous) (29–28, 29–28, 29–28)	3	5:00
Lightweight	Jeremy Stephens	def.	Rafael dos Anjos	KO (punches)	3	0:39
Lightweight	Mark Bocek	def.	Alvin Robinson	Submission (rear-naked choke)	3	3:16
Welterweight	Matt Brown	def.	Ryan Thomas	Submission (armbar)	2	0:57

== Bonus awards ==
The following fighters received $60,000 bonuses.

- Fight of the Night: Aaron Riley vs. Jorge Gurgel
- Knockout of the Night: Jeremy Stephens
- Submission of the Night: Dustin Hazelett

== Purses ==
The total payroll for the event was $1,118,000.

Brock Lesnar: $450,000 (includes $200,000 win bonus) def. Randy Couture: $250,000

Kenny Florian: $80,000 ($40,000 win bonus) def. Joe Stevenson: $35,000

Dustin Hazelett: $28,000 ($14,000 win bonus) def. Tamdan McCrory: $10,000

Gabriel Gonzaga: $110,000 ($55,000 win bonus) def. Josh Hendricks: $8,000

Demian Maia: $40,000 ($20,000 win bonus) def. Nate Quarry: $25,000

Aaron Riley: $8,000 ($4,000 win bonus) def. Jorge Gurgel: $10,000

Jeremy Stephens: $16,000 ($8,000 win bonus) def. Rafael dos Anjos: $4,000

Mark Bocek: $18,000 ($9,000 win bonus) def. Alvin Robinson: $7,000

Matt Brown $16,000 ($8,000 win bonus) def. Ryan Thomas: $3,000

== See also ==
- Ultimate Fighting Championship
- List of UFC champions
- List of UFC events
- 2008 in UFC
