= Dynamite!! USA =

Elite Xtreme Combat MMA event in 2007

Dynamite USA!!
- The poster for Dynamite USA!!
- Promotion: K-1 Hero's; Elite XC
- Date: June 2, 2007
- Venue: Los Angeles Memorial Coliseum
- City: Los Angeles, California
- Attendance: 18,340 (3,674 actual paid)
- Total gate: $2,545,590
- Buyrate: 35,000

SoftBank presents Dynamite!! USA was a mixed martial arts (MMA) event co-promoted by Fighting and Entertainment Group (FEG), the promoters of K-1 kickboxing events and Hero's MMA events, and EliteXC. The event was held on Saturday, June 2, 2007 at the Los Angeles Memorial Coliseum in Los Angeles, California. Mauro Ranallo, Bill Goldberg, and Jay Glazer did commentary.

== Background ==
The event featured the MMA debut of former professional wrestler Brock Lesnar and the anticipated rematch between Royce Gracie and Kazushi Sakuraba. The show also featured the MMA debut of NFL wide receiver Johnnie Morton.

The event was aired in two parts in the United States, with three preliminary bouts airing for free on Showtime and a main fight card shown on pay-per-view. In Japan, the card was aired as a two-hour edited broadcast on TBS on June 4, 2007. A condensed one-hour version of the entire event was broadcast on Showtime June 9, 2007. The Pay Per View cost viewers $29.95

== Controversy ==
=== Pre-fight problems ===
The event encountered numerous problems and controversies even before it began. FEG had difficulties obtaining a promoter's license, and was only granted a temporary one by the California State Athletic Commission eight days before the event.

Popular South Korean fighter Hong-Man Choi, initially scheduled to fight Brock Lesnar, was denied a license to fight in the state roughly a week and a half before the event for medical reasons (later reported to be a tumor on his pituitary gland). K-1 continued to advertise a Lesnar vs. Choi bout up until the day of the fight, despite knowing that it would not occur.

An originally announced women's bout featuring Jan Finney vs. Gina Carano was canceled on May 16, 2007, when Carano withdrew due to illness.

Antônio Silva was also removed from the card due to an undisclosed medical condition, and was replaced by Tim Persey.

An announced match between Ray Sefo and Marvin Eastman was dropped from the card with no explanation given.

=== Attendance and live gate ===
On June 7, 2007, the California State Athletic Commission (CSAC) announced that 42,757 tickets were distributed for the event – something promoters say validated the claim of having the largest attendance for a Mixed Martial Arts event in North America (a record previously held by UFC 68). The paid gate for the event was $2,545,590. However, the promoters of the event paid $2,342,500 of that to buy 39,083 tickets to its own event. The final verified paid attendance number for K-1 Dynamite stands at 3,674 which generated $203,090 in revenue.

=== Post-fight ===
Fighter Tim Percy tested positive for methamphetamines after his fight, and was suspended by the CSAC. In addition, Johnnie Morton tested positive for anabolic steroids and Royce Gracie tested positive for Nandrolone, a commonly used anabolic steroid.

== Results ==
Main card (PPV)
Weight class				Method	Round	Time	Notes
Heavyweight	Brock Lesnar	def.	Kim Min-soo	TKO (submission to punches)	1	1:09
Catchweight (188 lbs)	Royce Gracie	def.	Kazushi Sakuraba	Decision (unanimous) (30–27, 29–28, 29–28)	3	5:00	(Note: Gracie tested positive for banned substances post-fight.)
Lightweight	Hideo Tokoro	def.	Brad Pickett	Submission (armbar)	1	2:41
Catchweight (192 lbs)	Yoon Dong-sik	def.	Melvin Manhoef	Submission (armbar)	2	1:17
Super Heavyweight	Mighty Siliga	def.	Ruben Villareal	TKO (punches)	1	1:33
Catchweight (213 lbs)	Bernard Ackah	def.	Johnnie Morton	KO (punch)	1	0:38	(Note: Morton tested positive for banned substances post-fight.)
Preliminary card (Showtime)
Welterweight	Jake Shields	def.	Ido Pariente	Submission (rear-naked choke)	1	2:06
Catchweight (160 lbs)	Gesias Cavalcante	def.	Nam Phan	TKO (punches)	1	0:26
Heavyweight	Jonathan Wiezorek	def.	Tim Persey	TKO (punches)	2	0:50	(Note: Persey tested positive for banned substances post-fight.)
Preliminary card (unaired)
Lightweight	Katsuhiko Nagata	def.	Isaiah Hill	Decision (split) (29–28, 28–29, 30–27)	3	5:00

== Purses ==
The overall disclosed fighter payroll for the event was $1,057,500.

Fighter	Fight Earnings	Notes
Brock Lesnar	$170,000	No win bonus
Royce Gracie	$300,000	No win bonus
Johnnie Morton	$100,000	Purse withheld
Melvin Manhoef	$50,000	
Jonathan Wiezorek	$40,000	Includes $25K win bonus
Gesias Calvancanti	$36,000	Fined $9K for weight
Min Soo Kim	$30,000	
Kazushi Sakuraba	$130,000	
"Mighty" Mo Siliga	$30,000	
Ruben Villareal	$30,000	
Nam Phan	$29,500	Additional $4.5K due to opponent's weight
Jake Shields	$24,000	
Dong Sik Yoon	$20,000	
Tim Persey	$20,000	
Hideo Tokoro	$15,000	No win bonus
Katsuhiko Nagata	$15,000	No win bonus
Brad Pickett	$8,000	
Bernard Ackah	$5,000	No win bonus
Ido Pariente	$2,500	
Isaiah Hill	$2,500	

== See also ==
- Elite Xtreme Combat
- K-1 Premium Dynamite!!
- List of K-1 Events
- List of EliteXC events
