= 2017 in LUX Fight League =

Information
- First date: July 21, 2017
- Last date: July 21, 2017

Events
- Total events: 1

Fights
- Total fights: 4

The year 2017 was the first year in the history of LUX Fight League, a mixed martial arts promotion based in Mexico. 2017 had only 1 event, LUX 001.

== Events list ==
#	Event	Date held	Venue	City
1	LUX 001	July 21, 2017	Posada Hotel	Tampico, Mexico

== LUX 001 ==
LUX 001
- Promotion: LUX Fight League
- Date: July 21, 2017
- Venue: Posada Hotel
- City: Tampico, Mexico

Event chronology
LUX 001	LUX 002

LUX 001 was an inaugural event held on July 21, 2017, at Posada Hotel in Tampico, Mexico.

=== Background ===
On July 3, 2017, it was announced that Efraín Escudero (former UFC fighter) and Bruno Murata would face off in the main event.

=== Results ===
Main card
Weight class				Method	Round	Time	Notes
Lightweight	Efraín Escudero	def.	Bruno Murata	Decision (unanimous)	3	5:00
Catchweight	Rubén Lozano	def.	Fernando Moya	TKO (punches)	1	N/A
Lightweight	Luis Vallejo	def.	Alex Nuñez	TKO (head kick and punches)	1	1:47
Catchweight	Noel Torres	def.	Christian Villela	TKO (punches)	1	N/A
