= Warren Faidley =

American storm chaser

Warren Faidley (born May 11, 1957) is an American storm chaser. Faidley is credited as the world's first full-time, professional storm photographer.

== Biography ==
Faidley is a graduate from University of Arizona and Pima Community College.

His very first tornado chase landed him in Saragosa, Texas a small community that had been swept away by a violent F4 tornado on May 22, 1987. His professional career was launched in October 1988 after he took a photograph of lightning hitting a light pole in an oil and gasoline tank farm in Tucson, Arizona. The image was published in Life Magazine, billing him as a "Storm Chaser."

In 1997 Faidley was the subject of Stephen Kramer's book Eye of the Storm.
