= The Ultimate Fighter: Team Nogueira vs. Team Mir =

UFC mixed martial arts television series and event in 2008

- Genre: Reality, Sports
- Created by: Craig Piligian, Frank Fertitta III, Lorenzo Fertitta, Dana White
- Starring: Dana White, Antônio Rodrigo Nogueira, and Frank Mir
- Country of origin: United States

Production
- Running time: 60 minutes

Original release
- Network: Spike TV
- Release: September 17 – December 13, 2008

The Ultimate Fighter: Team Nogueira vs. Team Mir is the eighth installment of the Ultimate Fighting Championship (UFC) produced reality television series The Ultimate Fighter, which went into production in late May 2008 and premiered on September 17, 2008 on Spike TV. This season features Light Heavyweight fighters (186–205 lb) and Lightweight fighters (146–155 lb).

UFC interim Heavyweight champion Antônio Rodrigo Nogueira and the #1 Heavyweight contender and former UFC Heavyweight champion Frank Mir served as coaches for the two teams. After the completion of the series, the two met for the UFC Interim Heavyweight title at UFC 92 in December.

== Cast ==
=== Coaches ===
- Team Nogueira
  - Antônio Rodrigo Nogueira, head coach
  - Alex "Pitmonster" Alves, assistant coach
  - Daniel Valverde, jiu jitsu coach
  - Al Stankiewicz, striking coach
- Team Mir
  - Frank Mir, head coach
  - Ken Hahn, striking coach
  - Robert Drysdale, jiu jitsu coach
  - Demian Maia, jiu jitsu coach

=== Fighters ===
- Team Mir
  - Light Heavyweights: Krzysztof Soszynski, Vinny Magalhães, Eliot Marshall*, Tom Lawlor.
  - Lightweights: Junie Browning, Shane Nelson, Dave Kaplan, George Roop.
- Team Nogueira
  - Light Heavyweights: Ryan Bader, Shane Primm, Kyle Kingsbury*, Jules Bruchez.
  - Lightweights: Phillipe Nover, Efraín Escudero, John Polakowski, Rolando Delgado*.
- Eliminated in Entry Round:
  - Lightweights: Jose Aguilar, Fernando Bernstein, Charles Diaz, Joe Duarte, Brandon Garner, Wesley Murch, Ido Pariente.
  - Light Heavyweights: Lance Evans, Jason Guida (did not make weight), Ryan Jimmo, Ryan Lopez, Eric Magee, Sean O'Connell, Mike Stewart.
- Unassigned *:
  - Antwain Britt, Karn Grigoryan, Brian McLaughlin.

*Britt was replaced by Marshall on episode 2 due to injury. On episode 3, both McLaughlin and Grigoryan were injured and then replaced by Delgado and Kingsbury respectively.

=== Others ===
- Host: Dana White
- Narrator: Mike Rowe

== Episodes ==
Episode 1 – Ready to Fight

- Before the introduction of the show has started, Phillipe Nover fainted due to heat exhaustion.
- Dana White introduces Antônio Rodrigo Nogueira and Frank Mir as the coaches to the fighters and announces that the fighters will have to fight their way into the house.
- Preliminary round matches are two rounds for five minutes each.
- Jason Guida is unable to make weight for the preliminary round and is replaced by Mike Stewart.
- Krzysztof Soszynski defeats Mike Stewart by TKO (strikes) at :17 in the first round.
- Dave Kaplan defeats Fernando Bernstein by submission (rear naked choke) at 2:20 in the first round.
- Phillipe Nover defeats Joe Duarte by submission (rear naked choke) at 3:33 in the second round.
- Jules Bruchez defeats Eric Magee by submission (rear naked choke) at 1:43 in the first round.
- Vinny Magalhães defeats Lance Evans by TKO (rib injury) at :34 in the first round.
- Antwain Britt defeats Ryan Jimmo by majority decision after two rounds.
- Brian McLaughlin defeats Brandon Garner by no contest.
- This match is ruled a no contest after Garner lands a knee to a downed McLaughlin's head. White then rules that McLaughlin will move on to the house.
- Junie Browning defeats Jose Aguilar by TKO (forfeit) at the end of the first round.

Episode 2 – Down to Business

- Elimination round matches continue.
- John Polakowski defeats Wesley Murch by TKO (referee stoppage) at :15 in the second round.
- Shane Primm defeats Sean O'Connell by submission (rear naked choke) at 3:40 in the first round.
- Efrain Escudero defeats Ido Pariente by submission (rear naked choke) at 3:37 in the first round.
- Tom Lawlor defeats Ryan Lopez by submission (rear naked choke) at :42 in the first round.
- George Roop defeats Rolando Delgado by decision after two rounds.
- Ryan Bader defeats Kyle Kingsbury by submission (arm triangle choke) at 1:33 in the second round.
- Shane Nelson defeats Charles Diaz by decision after two rounds.
- Karn Grigoryan defeats Eliot Marshall by split decision after three rounds.
- White announces that Antwain Britt broke his hand and would be unable to fight for about six to eight weeks. Therefore, he would not be able to compete and move into the house. Marshall is selected to replace Britt.

Episode 3 – Demons

- Brian McLaughlin and Karn Grigoryan were discovered to have fractured noses after their preliminary matches. White announces that the Nevada State Athletic Commission has suspended them for 180 days as a result and that they have to go home.
- Kyle Kingsbury is brought in to replace Grigoryan and McLaughlin's replacement is initially a mystery.
- A coin is flipped (red for Nogueira, blue for Mir) and Mir wins. He elects to choose the first fighter, meaning that Nogueira gets to pick the first fight.
- Light Heavyweight selection:

Coach	1st Pick	2nd Pick	3rd Pick	4th Pick
Mir	Krzysztof Soszynski	Vinny Magalhães	Eliot Marshall	Tom Lawlor
Nogueira	Ryan Bader	Shane Primm	Kyle Kingsbury	Jules Bruchez

- Lightweight selection:

Coach	1st Pick	2nd Pick	3rd Pick	4th Pick
Mir	Junie Browning	Shane Nelson	David Kaplan	George Roop
Nogueira	Phillipe Nover	Efrain Escudero	John Polakowski	

- The fighters comment on Browning's bipolar tendencies, as he switches easily from happy to crying to agitated to showing affection.
- The day after the picks, Rolando Delgado is announced as McLaughlin's replacement.
- Nogueira announces the first match of his first pick Bader against Lawlor.
- Team Mir pranks the red team by taking all of the Team Nogueira members' underwear and socks and Saran wrapping them to Bader's bed.
- Ryan Bader defeats Tom Lawlor by KO (punch) at 3:41 of the first round.

Episode 4 – Punk

- The fighters are given the opportunity to watch UFC 84 on TV. Junie Browning and Shane Nelson begin drinking. This escalates to the two of them throwing things in the pool, as well as shoving some of the other fighters, attempting to pick fights.
- The next day, White shows up and talks to all of the fighters and particularly to Browning and Nelson about their behavior the previous night. He announces that he is giving both fighters a second chance and will not be kicking them out of the house. White tells Nelson that if he is interested in fighting already, he will be next in the first 155 lb fight.
- Nogueira announces the next match with Escudero against Nelson.
- Efrain Escudero defeats Shane Nelson by submission (triangle choke) at 4:32 into the second round.
- Following the match, Browning begins talking smack to Escudero who is still in the cage being looked at by the doctors and his coaches. Escudero simply smiles back at Browning's continuing taunts.
- Finally, the Kentuckian jumps over the fence and into the cage. Nogueira and other coaches hold him back and the episode ends.

Episode 5 – From Chill to Kill

- The episode starts with a recap of the previous fight. Then, Junie Browning jumping into the cage is shown again. The coaches calm down Browning and escort him out of the cage.
- White says that the head of the athletic commission was not at the match. If he were, White believes that Browning's fighter's license would have been revoked. Later, Browning apologizes to Mir and to White.
- UFC middleweight champion Anderson Silva visits Team Nogueira at the gym and helps them train.
- Krzysztof Soszynski and other members of the blue team continue pulling pranks on Team Nogueira. This time, by freezing Efrain Escudero's wet underwear and putting itching powder in several beds.
- Nogueira matches Primm against Marshall.
- The red team returns the previous prank by rubbing fish oil on the walls and beds of Team Mir's rooms. Vinny Magalhães is angry over his bed being messed with, confronts Team Nogueira, and urinates on Escudero's bed.
- At the gym, Nogueira asks Mir to talk to his guys about stopping the pranks, but feels brushed off. Nogueira goes to the house and encourages his guys to stop with the pranks.
- Team Mir shows up and Nogueira continues talking to all the guys about stopping the pranks in the house. Soszynski states that he will pull another prank.
- Eliot Marshall defeats Shane Primm by submission (rear naked choke) at 2:36 in the first round.
- A preview of next week episode shows the match of Junie Browning vs. Rolando Delgado.

Episode 6 – Fight, Fight, Kill, Kill

- Mir visits the house and questions Rolando Delgado about how he earned his black belt in Jiu-Jitsu.
- At the UFC Training Center, Mir matches Browning against Delgado.
- Browning throws a "McDojo" black belt at Delgado and spits on it.
- Anderson Silva is still visiting Team Nogueira and after Browning's incident with the black belt, the champion off-camera is said to be upset by his antics.
- At the weigh-ins, Browning weighs in at 158 pounds and is given one hour to make weight. He continues cutting, and successfully weighs in with his second attempt.
- Junie Browning defeats Rolando Delgado by split decision after three rounds.
- After the match, Browning apologizes to Nogueira for spitting on the black belt at the fight announcement.

Episode 7 – Body Bag

- Mir gives Junie Browning a dressing down following his split decision win for a lackluster performance in the cage.
- Krzysztof Soszynski hurts his thumb during training and believes it is either broken or fractured.
- Magalhães comments to Mir that Nogueira's jiu jitsu is not of a high level.
- The red team bakes a cake for Nogueira's birthday and they all have dinner together at the TUF house.
- Mir announces the next fight match with his second pick Magalhães against Bruchez.
- The two Brazilians have an argument over Magalhães' comments on the level of Nogueira's jiu jitsu.
- Krzysztof Soszynski pranks Bruchez by placing a stuffed body bag and an R.I.P. headstone on his bed; Bruchez laughs it off.
- Vinny Magalhães defeats Jules Bruchez by submission (armbar) at 3:25 in the first round.

Episode 8 – Splushi

- Tom Lawlor orders a fruit platter to eat every day. However, when he gets home from the training center, he often finds it already eaten by Team Nogueira. To retaliate against them, Lawlor and several members of Team Mir urinate in his own fruit platter and place it in the refrigerator.
- Mir matches Kaplan against Nover.
- Team Nogueira arrives at the house and eats Lawlor's urinated fruit platter. Only after they finished, were they told what had been done to the fruit platter.
- Nover complains that someone in the house is eating his sushi. Kyle Kingsbury of Team Nogueira ejaculates on Nover's sushi and places it in the refrigerator. Kaplan eats a piece of Nover's sushi and is afterwards told what was done to it. He then threatens to get Team Nogueira back with fecal matter.
- Phillipe Nover defeats David Kaplan by submission (rear naked choke) at 1:27 in the first round.

Episode 9 – Hurts Like Hell

- Don House, a boxing trainer, examines Soszynski's hand and says that he did not break or fracture his hand.
- David Kaplan gets drunk and claims that he cannot be knocked out, asking Tom Lawlor to hit him who at first declines to do so.
- At Kaplan's insistence, Lawlor punches him in the jaw and he falls to the floor unconscious. Afterwards, Kaplan claims he was not knocked out.
- Nogueira matches Kingsbury against Soszynski.
- Team Nogueira decides to prank Soszynski by filling his bedroom up with anything in the house they could move. They then placed a sign on Soszynski's door that said, "UFC Storage Room."
- Dan Henderson visits Team Mir's training session. Henderson says that he has been training Soszynski for two years now.
- Soszynski comes home to find his bedroom all filled up and he congratulates Team Nogueira for a good prank.
- In the Coaches' Challenge, the two coaches compete head-to-head for a $10,000 prize and coach's winning team wins $1,000 each. This season, Nogueira and Mir will face off doing soccer penalty kicks. They alternate turns and the first person to score 10 goals wins. Nogueira beats Mir, 10–6.
- Soszynski pranks Team Nogueira back by moving all of the kitchen utensils, pots, pans, plates, etc. to the basketball court.
- Krzysztof Soszynski defeats Kyle Kingsbury by submission (armbar) at 2:36 in the first round.

Episode 10 – Fire The Cannons

- Roop hurts his right hand during practice and it becomes swollen, to the point that he is unable to make a fist.
- By fight time, Roop says that his hand is okay, but it still appears to be swollen.
- George Roop defeats John Polakowski by unanimous decision after two rounds.
- Soszynski and others throw things like eggs off the balcony of the house to several guys in the hot tub.
- Browning gets hit by an egg and goes into a rage. However, there is no real damage to the house and Browning does not get into a physical altercation with anyone.
- The fighters who won their preliminary matches are brought into meet Mir, Nogueira, and White to discuss the semifinal matches.
- The semifinal matches are announced:
  - Ryan Bader vs. Eliot Marshall
  - Phillipe Nover vs. George Roop
  - Vinny Magalhães vs. Krzysztof Soszynski
  - Efrain Escudero vs. Junie Browning

Episode 11 – Make Him Pay

- Ryan Bader defeats Eliot Marshall by unanimous decision after three rounds.
- Phillipe Nover defeats George Roop by submission (kimura) at 1:41 in the first round.

Episode 12 – Three Strikes

- Vinny Magalhães defeats Krzysztof Soszynski by submission (armbar) at 3:45 in the first round.
- During practice, Browning says that he does not want to fight, suggesting that Shane Nelson should fight in his place.
- That evening, Browning and Shane Primm were discussing future matches and talking smack to each other. Browning throws a coffee mug at Primm, which shatters around him. Browning then goes over and punches Primm.
- White shows up to have a talk with Browning. White discusses the Kentuckian's behavior and that he should have been kicked off the show already. He talks about how Browning is afraid of failing and is trying to get kicked off the show on purpose.
- White then talks with the other fighters in the house who agree to let Browning stay in the house and fight in his match.
- Efrain Escudero defeats Junie Browning by submission (d'arce choke) at 3:26 in the second round.
- Browning goes outside the training center and claims that he will quit fighting since he was unable to defeat Escudero.
- Mir is noticed not yelling many instructions in the second round. He explains that Browning did not listen to him and would sit down because he is not a cheerleader.
- A previous bet was made between the coaches that if any of Nogueira's fighters makes it to the finale, Mir will shave his head. Mir faces up to the bet and lets Nogueira shave his head.
- Browning, in a different interview, now says that he will fight again.

== Tournament bracket ==
=== Light Heavyweights ===
Elimination Round
Jules Bruchez	1
Vinny Magalhães	SUB
Kyle Kingsbury	1
Krzysztof Soszynski	SUB
Ryan Bader	KO
Tom Lawlor	1
Shane Primm	1
Eliot Marshall	SUB

Semi-finals
Vinny Magalhães	SUB
Krzysztof Soszynski	1
Ryan Bader	UD
Eliot Marshall	3

Finale
Vinny Magalhães	1
Ryan Bader	TKO

=== Lightweights ===
Elimination Round
Phillipe Nover	SUB
David Kaplan	1
John Polakowski	2
George Roop	UD
Efrain Escudero	SUB
Shane Nelson	2
Rolando Delgado	3
Junie Browning	SD

Semi-finals
Phillipe Nover	SUB
George Roop	1
Efrain Escudero	SUB
Junie Browning	2

Finale
Phillipe Nover	3
Efrain Escudero	UD

Legend
	Team Nogueira
	Team Mir
UD	Unanimous Decision
SD	Split Decision
SUB	Submission
(T) KO	(Technical) Knockout

== The Ultimate Fighter 8 Finale ==
The Ultimate Fighter: Team Nogueira vs. Team Mir Finale
- The poster for The Ultimate Fighter: Team Nogueira vs. Team Mir Finale
- Promotion: Ultimate Fighting Championship
- Date: December 13, 2008
- Venue: Palms Casino Resort
- City: Las Vegas, Nevada
- Attendance: 1,853
- Total gate: $405,000

Event chronology
UFC: Fight for the Troops	The Ultimate Fighter: Team Nogueira vs. Team Mir Finale	UFC 92: The Ultimate 2008

The Ultimate Fighter: Team Nogueira vs. Team Mir Finale (also known as The Ultimate Fighter 8 Finale) was a mixed martial arts event held by the Ultimate Fighting Championship (UFC) on December 13, 2008.

=== Background ===
Featured were the finals from The Ultimate Fighter: Team Nogueira vs Team Mir in both the Lightweight and Light Heavyweight divisions.

Wilson Gouveia officially weighed in at 189 pounds, failing to meet the requirements of the Middleweight weight class. The match was still held, but at a Catchweight with Gouveia forfeiting 20% of his earnings to Jason MacDonald.

=== Results ===
Main card (Spike TV)
Weight class				Method	Round	Time	Notes
Lightweight	Efraín Escudero	def.	Phillipe Nover	Decision (unanimous) (29–28, 29–28, 29–28)	3	5:00	(Note: The Ultimate Fighter 8 Lightweight Final)
Light Heavyweight	Ryan Bader	def.	Vinny Magalhães	TKO (punches)	1	2:18	(Note: The Ultimate Fighter 8 Light Heavyweight Final)
Welterweight	Anthony Johnson	def.	Kevin Burns	KO (head kick)	3	0:28
Catchweight (189 lb)	Wilson Gouveia	def.	Jason MacDonald	TKO (submission to strikes)	1	2:18
Lightweight	Junie Browning	def.	Dave Kaplan	Submission (armbar)	2	1:32
Preliminary card
Light Heavyweight	Krzysztof Soszynski	def.	Shane Primm	Submission (kimura)	2	3:27	(Note: This bout aired on the broadcast following the Bader vs. Magalhães bout.)
Light Heavyweight	Eliot Marshall	def.	Jules Bruchez	Submission (rear-naked choke)	1	1:27	(Note: This bout aired on the broadcast following the Browning vs. Kaplan bout.)
Light Heavyweight	Tom Lawlor	def.	Kyle Kingsbury	Decision (unanimous) (29–28, 29–28, 29–28)	3	5:00
Lightweight	Shane Nelson	def.	George Roop	Decision (split) (29–28, 28–29, 29–28)	3	5:00
Lightweight	Rolando Delgado	def.	John Polakowski	Submission (guillotine choke)	2	2:18

=== Bonus awards ===
The following fighters received $25,000 bonuses.

- Fight of the Night: Junie Browning vs. Dave Kaplan
- Knockout of the Night: Anthony Johnson
- Submission of the Night: Krzysztof Soszynski

== Coaches' fight ==
UFC 92: The Ultimate 2008 was held on December 27, 2008 in Paradise, Nevada.

- Interim Heavyweight Championship bout: (Brazil) Antônio Rodrigo Nogueira (ic) vs. (United States) Frank Mir

Frank Mir defeated Antônio Rodrigo Nogueira (ic) via TKO (punches) at 1:54 of the second round.

== See also ==
- 2008 in UFC
- List of current UFC fighters
- List of UFC champions
- List of UFC events
