= Tamdan McCrory =

American mixed martial arts fighter (born 1986)

- Born: November 5, 1986 (age 39); Ithaca, New York, United States
- Other names: The Barn Cat
- Nationality: American
- Height: 6 ft 5 in (1.96 m)
- Weight: 185 lb (84 kg; 13.2 st)
- Division: Middleweight (2014-present); Welterweight (2006-2009)
- Reach: 78.0 in (198 cm)
- Stance: Orthodox
- Fighting out of: Binghamton, New York, United States
- Team: Binns Management MMA
- Rank: Black belt in Brazilian Jiu-Jitsu under Ken Kronenberg
- Years active: 2006–2009, 2014–present

Mixed martial arts record
- Total: 19
- Wins: 14
- By knockout: 8
- By submission: 5
- By decision: 1
- Losses: 5
- By knockout: 2
- By submission: 2
- By decision: 1

Other information
- Mixed martial arts record from Sherdog

Tamdan Wade McCrory (born November 5, 1986) is an American professional mixed martial artist who formerly competed in the Middleweight division of the Ultimate Fighting Championship. A professional competitor since 2006, McCrory has also formerly competed for Bellator MMA and the Cage Fury Fighting Championships.

== Background ==
McCrory was born and raised in the rural community of Ithaca, New York along with his twin sister. Growing up, McCrory was often bullied for being a self-proclaimed "nerd, " which later helped fuel his motivation for a career in mixed martial arts. McCrory attended and graduated from Ithaca High School in 2004 where he competed in wrestling and was a 2002 New York National Team Cadet for the Greco-Roman category. In May 2008, McCrory graduated from the State University of New York College at Cortland with a Bachelor of Science degree in Kinesiology.

== Mixed martial arts career ==
=== Early career ===
McCrory began fighting mixed martial arts in 2006. He became one of the youngest NABC Champions at the age of 19. He also made an appearance in the BET show Iron Ring as a contestant in the Middleweight category. McCrory held an undefeated professional record of 8-0 before being signed by the UFC.

=== Ultimate Fighting Championship ===
In May 2007, McCrory signed a contract with the UFC.

McCrory made his debut defeating The Ultimate Fighter 4 alumni, Pete Spratt. Five months after the win, McCrory took his first professional defeat to Japanese superstar Akihiro Gono at UFC 78. He quickly bounced back with a win defeating The Ultimate Fighter 2 runner up, Luke Cummo. At UFC 91, McCrory lost his second fight to another up-and-coming Welterweight Dustin Hazelett. Tamdan was then a late call-up to fight Ryan Madigan at UFC 96. Tamdan lost to John Howard at UFC 101 on the preliminary card. Following the loss, McCrory was released from the UFC.

=== Post-UFC ===
McCrory stated his intentions to move into the Middleweight division. He was looking to gain a spot in the second season of Bellator's Middleweight Tournament, but his management's offer was declined. McCrory subsequently retired from MMA citing that it was taking too much time away from his family. Four years after his retirement, however, McCrory signed with Binns Management in 2013 and subsequently announced his return to mixed martial arts.

McCrory made his MMA return on September 5, 2014 when he faced Brennan Ward at Bellator 123. He won via spectacular knockout 21 seconds into the first round.

McCrory faced Jason Butcher at Bellator 134 on February 27, 2015. He won the fight via submission in the first round. In August 2015, McCrory was given his release from Bellator to re-sign with the UFC.

=== Return to UFC ===
Following two impressive wins in Bellator MMA, McCrory announced that he had re-signed with the UFC.

In his UFC return, McCrory faced Josh Samman on December 19, 2015 at UFC on Fox 17. He won the back-and-forth fight via submission in the third round.

McCrory next faced Krzysztof Jotko on June 18, 2016 at UFC Fight Night 89. He lost the fight via knockout in the first round.

McCrory faced Nate Marquardt on October 1, 2016 at UFC Fight Night 96. He lost the fight via knockout in the second round. Following this loss, he was released from the UFC.

== Personal life ==
McCrory married his wife, Haley, in 2010. Haley is the morning news anchor for WBNG-TV in Binghamton, NY. The couple has a daughter, Keelin.

== Championships and awards ==
- North American Boxing Council
  - NABC MMA Welterweight Championship (One time)

== Mixed martial arts record ==
Professional record breakdown
19 matches	14 wins	5 losses
By knockout	8	2
By submission	5	2
By decision	1	1

Res.	Record	Opponent	Method	Event	Date	Round	Time	Location	Notes
Loss	14–5	Nate Marquardt	KO (punch and head kick)	UFC Fight Night: Lineker vs. Dodson	October 1, 2016	2	4:44	Portland, Oregon, United States	
Loss	14–4	Krzysztof Jotko	KO (punches)	UFC Fight Night: MacDonald vs. Thompson	June 18, 2016	1	0:59	Ottawa, Ontario, Canada	
Win	14–3	Josh Samman	Submission (triangle choke)	UFC on Fox: dos Anjos vs. Cowboy 2	December 19, 2015	3	4:10	Orlando, Florida, United States	
Win	13–3	Jason Butcher	Submission (armbar)	Bellator 134	February 27, 2015	1	1:06	Uncasville, Connecticut, United States	
Win	12–3	Brennan Ward	KO (punches)	Bellator 123	September 5, 2014	1	0:21	Uncasville, Connecticut, United States	Middleweight debut.
Loss	11–3	John Howard	Decision (split)	UFC 101	August 8, 2009	3	5:00	Philadelphia, Pennsylvania, United States	
Win	11–2	Ryan Madigan	TKO (punches)	UFC 96	March 7, 2009	1	3:35	Columbus, Ohio, United States	
Loss	10–2	Dustin Hazelett	Submission (reverse armbar)	UFC 91	November 15, 2008	1	3:59	Las Vegas, Nevada, United States	
Win	10–1	Luke Cummo	Decision (unanimous)	UFC 87	August 10, 2008	3	5:00	Minneapolis, Minnesota, United States	
Loss	9–1	Akihiro Gono	Submission (armbar)	UFC 78	November 17, 2007	2	3:19	Atlantic City, New Jersey, United States	
Win	9–0	Pete Spratt	Submission (triangle choke)	UFC Fight Night: Stout vs. Fisher	June 12, 2007	2	2:04	Hollywood, Florida, United States	
Win	8–0	Nuri Shakir	Submission (rear-naked choke)	CFFC 4	April 13, 2007	2	3:22	Atlantic City, New Jersey, United States	
Win	7–0	Anthony D'Angelo	TKO (punches)	CFFC 3	January 19, 2007	1	2:34	Atlantic City, New Jersey, United States	
Win	6–0	Mike Littlefield	TKO (punches)	CFFC 2	October 6, 2006	1	4:10	Atlantic City, New Jersey, United States	Won the vacant NABC MMA Welterweight Championship.
Win	5–0	Jason Giroux	Technical Submission (triangle choke)	WFL 10	September 23, 2006	1	3:07	Revere, Massachusetts, United States	
Win	4–0	Joe Manzello	KO (punches)	FFP: Untamed 7	August 19, 2006	1	4:45	Revere, Massachusetts, United States	
Win	3–0	Brendan Hoxie	TKO (body kick)	CZ 17	August 5, 2006	2	1:37	Plymouth, Massachusetts, United States	
Win	2–0	Bobby Diaz	TKO (punches)	FFP: Untamed 5	June 16, 2006	2	0:42	Mansfield, Massachusetts, United States	
Win	1–0	John Jenner	TKO (punches)	WFL: Judgment Night 2	June 3, 2006	1	1:19	Revere, Massachusetts, United States	
