= 2018 in Rizin Fighting Federation =

Information
- First date: May 6, 2018
- Last date: December 31, 2018

Events
- Total events: 6

Fights
- Total fights: 66
- Title fights: 2

Chronology
2017 in Rizin Fighting Federation	2018 in Rizin Fighting Federation	2019 in Rizin Fighting Federation

The year 2018 was the fourth year in the history of the Rizin Fighting Federation, a mixed martial arts promotion based in Japan. The year began with Rizin 10 in Fukuoka on May 6, 2018.

Rizin events are broadcast through a television agreement with Fuji Television. In North America and Europe, Rizin events are available via PPV on FITE TV.

== Background ==
Nobuyuki Sakakibara announced that Rizin will do 5 events in 2018: May, July, August, September and the December 31st show.

== List of events ==
#	Event	Date	Venue	Location	Attendance
1	Rizin 10 - Fukuoka	May 6, 2018	Marine Messe Fukuoka	Fukuoka, Japan	7,910
2	Rizin 11 - Saitama	July 29, 2018	Saitama Super Arena	Saitama, Japan	17,912
3	Rizin 12 - Aichi - Ken	August 12, 2018	Aichi Prefectural Gymnasium	Nagoya, Japan	5,567
4	Rizin 13 - Saitama	September 30, 2018	Saitama Super Arena	Saitama, Japan	27,208
5	Rizin - Heisei's Last Yarennoka!	December 31, 2018	Saitama Super Arena	Saitama, Japan	7,498
6	Rizin 14 - Saitama	December 31, 2018	Saitama Super Arena	Saitama, Japan	29,105

== Title fights ==
Title fights in 2018
#	Weight Class				Method	Round	T.Time	Event	Notes
1	Super Atomweight 49 kg	(Japan) Ayaka Hamasaki	def.	(Japan) Kanna Asakura	Submission (Armbar)	2	9:34	Rizin 14 - Saitama	For the inaugural Rizin Women's Super Atomweight Championship
2	Bantamweight 61 kg	(Japan) Kyoji Horiguchi	def.	(United States) Darrion Caldwell	Submission (Guillotine Choke)	3	11:13	Rizin 14 - Saitama	For the inaugural Rizin Bantamweight Championship

== Rizin 10 - Fukuoka ==
Rizin 10 - Fukuoka
- Promotion: Rizin Fighting Federation
- Date: May 6, 2018
- Venue: Marine Messe Fukuoka
- City: Fukuoka, Japan

Rizin 10 - Fukuoka was a mixed martial arts event held by the Rizin Fighting Federation on May 6, 2018 at the Marine Messe Fukuoka in Fukuoka, Japan.

=== Background ===
Bantamweight Grand Prix Champion Kyoji Horiguchi was announced to take on fellow veteran Ian McCall in a much anticipated bout that failed to materialize during the New Years Event. Rounding off the marquee match-ups were the kickboxing phenomenon, Tenshin Nasukawa, taking on DEEP flyweight champion Yusaku Nakamura, and newly-crowned atomweight queen Kanna Asakura, who will face former King of the Cage atomweight champion Melissa Karagianis.

Yachi Yusuke will face off against UFC-vet Diego Nunes, and the Kunlun Fight strawweight champion Weili Zhang was supposed to face Kanako Murata. However, Zhang suffered an injury on her left shoulder during training and was forced to withdraw from the fight. She was replaced by the former TUF 23 cast member Lanchana Green. This event also saw the return of the former Invicta atomweight champion Ayaka Hamasaki, as well as up-and-coming prospects Manel Kape and Kai Asakura.

=== Results ===
Rizin 10
Weight Class				Method	Round	T.Time	Notes
Bantamweight 61 kg	(Japan) Kyoji Horiguchi	def.	(United States) Ian McCall	KO (Punch)	1	0:09	
Flyweight 57 kg	(Japan) Tenshin Nasukawa	def.	(Japan) Yusaku Nakamura	TKO (3 Knockdowns Rules)	2	4:42	Kickboxing bout
Super Atomweight 49 kg	(Japan) Kanna Asakura	def.	(Canada) Melissa Karagianis	Decision (Unanimous)	3	15:00	
Lightweight 70 kg	(Japan) Yusuke Yachi	def.	(Brazil) Diego Nunes	Decision (Split)	3	15:00	
Lightweight 70 kg	(United States) Daron Cruickshank	def.	(Japan) Koshi Matsumoto	KO (Head Kick)	1	3:52	
Strawweight 51.5 kg	(Japan) Issei Ishii	def.	(Japan) Daishin Sakai	Decision (Unanimous)	3	9:00	Kickboxing bout
Catchweight 59 kg	(Japan) Kai Asakura	def.	(Angola) Manel Kape	Decision (Split)	3	15:00	
Super Atomweight 49 kg	(Japan) Ayaka Hamasaki	def.	(United States) Alyssa Garcia	Decision (Unanimous)	3	15:00	
Heavyweight 120 kg	(Croatia) Ante Delija	def.	(Brazil) Ricardo Prasel	Decision (Unanimous)	3	15:00	
Heavyweight 120 kg	(Suriname) Jairzinho Rozenstruik	def.	(Ukraine) Andrey Kovalev	Decision (Split)	3	15:00	
Strawweight 53 kg	(Japan) Kanako Murata	def.	(England) Lanchana Green	Submission (Anaconda Choke)	1	4:54	
Bantamweight 61 kg	(Japan) Tomohiro Kitai	vs.	(Japan) Kurogi Darvish	Draw (Split)	3	9:00	Kickboxing bout

== Rizin 11 - Saitama ==
Rizin 11 - Saitama
- Promotion: Rizin Fighting Federation
- Date: July 29, 2018
- Venue: Saitama Super Arena
- City: Saitama, Japan

Rizin 11 - Saitama was a mixed martial arts event held by the Rizin Fighting Federation on July 29, 2018 at the Saitama Super Arena in Saitama, Japan.

=== Background ===
After a 9-second knockout victory, Kyoji Horiguchi made a quick turnaround, in a long-awaited rematch against fellow Japanese champion Hiromasa Ogikubo. Ogikubo, the current Shooto bantamweight champion, has not lost since he last faced Horiguchi in 2013. Another rematch took place with Kanna Asakura taking on RENA, who she defeated in the final of the Atomweight Grand Prix.

Originally Mirko Cro Cop was scheduled for this event, however on May 21, 2018, while training for a bout in Bellator MMA against Roy Nelson, Crocop suffered multiple injuries to his left leg including an ACL tear, a partial MCL tear, and a LCL sprain. It was revealed that the recovery for these injuries would take a minimum of 5 months, and so he was ruled out of the event.

Originally a fight was set between Takanori Gomi and Andy Souwer. However, Souwer was forced to withdrawal due to signing an exclusive contract with ONE Championship. He was replaced by UFC veteran Melvin Guillard at a weight limit of 73.0kg. Guillard weighed in at 73.95kg, forcing the bout to be contested at a catchweight.

Originally a fight was set between Kai Asakura and Topnoi Tiger Muay Thai. However, Asakura was pulled from the event due to a knee injury and replaced by former Tenkaichi Champion Tadaaki Yamamoto

Originally a fight was set between Rin Nakai and Shizuka Sugiyama. However, Nakai was pulled from the event due to acute nephritis, and the bout was cancelled all together.

=== Results ===
Rizin 11
Weight Class				Method	Round	T.Time	Notes
Super Atomweight 49 kg	(Japan) Kanna Asakura	def.	(Japan) Rena Kubota	Decision (unanimous)	3	15:00	
Catchweight 60 kg	(Japan) Kyoji Horiguchi	def.	(Japan) Hiromasa Ougikubo	Decision (Unanimous)	2	15:00	
Light Heavyweight 93 kg	(Czech Republic) Jiří Procházka	def.	(Brazil) Bruno Cappelozza	KO (Punches)	1	1:41	
Catchweight 74 kg	(Japan) Takanori Gomi	def.	(United States) Melvin Guillard	KO (Punches)	1	2:33	
Lightweight 70 kg	(Brazil) Diego Brandao	def.	(Japan) Satoru Kitaoka	KO (Punches)	1	1:30	
Openweight	(Mongolia) Unurjargal Boldpurev	def.	(Japan) Shoma Shibisai	Decision (Unanimous)	3	15:00	
Lightweight 70 kg	(Japan) Kaito Ono	def.	(Japan) Yoshiya Uzatsuyo	KO (knee)	2	4:22	Kickboxing bout
Super Atomweight 49 kg	(Japan) Miyuu Yamamoto	def.	(Japan) Saori Ishioka	Decision (split)	3	15:00	
Catchweight 59 kg	(Thailand) Topnoi Thanongsaklek	def.	(Japan) Tadaaki Yamamoto	KO (Punch)	1	1:06	
Lightweight 70 kg	(United States) Daron Cruickshank	def.	(Brazil) Tom Santos	TKO (Elbows)	3	14:11	

== Rizin 12 - Nagoya ==
Rizin 12 - Nagoya
- Promotion: Rizin Fighting Federation
- Date: August 12, 2018
- Venue: Aichi Prefectural Gymnasium
- City: Nagoya, Japan

Rizin 12 - Nagoya was a mixed martial arts event held by the Rizin Fighting Federation on August 12, 2018 at the Aichi Prefectural Gymnasium in Nagoya, Japan.

=== Background ===
Former Jungle Fight Lightweight Champion Bruno Carvalho was expected to headline this event against Yusuke Yachi, but was forced off the card due to an injury. Carvalho was replaced by the undefeated Luiz Gustavo.

King Reina takes on veteran Kaitlin Young in a women's featherweight bout. Kiichi Kunimoto will face DEEP Welterweight Champion Ryuichiro Sumimura. Mikuru Asakura (who is Kai Asakura's older brother) is expected to face all-time great, Hatsu Hioki. Former UFC competitor Angela Magana makes her promotional debut against Kanako Murata.

=== Results ===
Rizin 12
Weight Class				Method	Round	T.Time	Notes
Lightweight 70 kg	(Brazil) Luiz Gustavo	def.	(Japan) Yusuke Yachi	KO (Punch)	2	7:32	
Bantamweight 61 kg	(Japan) Yuki Motoya	def.	(Japan) Kazuma Sone	Submission (Rear-Naked Choke)	2	9:31	
Welterweight 77 kg	(Japan) Kiichi Kunimoto	def.	(Japan) Ryuichiro Sumimura	Submission (Arm-Triangle Choke)	1	4:59	
Featherweight 65 kg	(United States) Kaitlin Young	def.	(Japan) Reina Miura	Decision (Unanimous)	3	15:00	
Catchweight 59 kg	(Japan) Daiki Naito	def.	(Japan) Hannya Hashimoto	TKO (Leg Kicks)	2	4:53	Kickboxing bout
Featherweight 66 kg	(Japan) Mikuru Asakura	def.	(Japan) Hatsu Hioki	KO (Head Kick and Punches)	1	3:45	
Heavyweight 120 kg	(Guam) Roque Martinez	def.	(Japan) Kiyoshi Kuwabara	TKO (Punches)	1	4:37	
Featherweight 65 kg	(Japan) Kaito Ono	def.	(Japan) Sho Ogawa	Decision (Unanimous)	3	9:00	Kickboxing bout
Strawweight 53 kg	(Japan) Kanako Murata	def.	(Puerto Rico) Angela Magana	Submission (Von Flue choke)	2	8:52	
Catchweight 59 kg	(Japan) Ryuki	def.	(Japan) NAOYA	Decision (Unanimous)	3	9:00	Kickboxing bout.
Lightweight 70 kg	(Japan) Shintaro Matsukura	def.	(Japan) Takahiro Okuyama	KO (Punch)	2	5:30	Kickboxing bout
Catchweight 53 kg	(Japan) Shota Takiya	def.	(Japan) Syuto Sato	Decision (Unanimous)	3	9:00	Kickboxing bout

== Rizin 13 - Saitama ==
Rizin 13 - Saitama
- Promotion: Rizin Fighting Federation
- Date: September 30, 2018
- Venue: Saitama Super Arena
- City: Saitama, Japan

Rizin 13 - Saitama was a mixed martial arts event held by the Rizin Fighting Federation on September 30, 2018 at the Saitama Super Arena in Saitama, Japan.

=== Background ===
A champion versus champion affair kicked off the card, as current Pancrase Strawweight Champion Mitsuhisa Sunabe took on reigning DEEP Strawweight Champion Haruo Ochi. Jiří Procházka looked to continue his winning streak against WSOF/PFL veteran Jake Heun. Brothers Mikuru and Kai Asakura fought Karshyga Dautbek and Topnoi Thanongsaklek, respectively. 4-time K-1 champion Taiga Kawabe made his RIZIN debut against fellow debutant Kento Haraguchi.

Miyuu Yamamoto rematched former King of the Cage Atomweight Champion Andy Nguyen; Nguyen defeated Yamamoto at RIZIN's 2016 New Year Eve card. Manel Kape returned to the RIZIN ring for a 5th time, and faced DEEP Flyweight Champion Yusaku Nakamura. Former Invicta Atomweight Champion Ayaka Hamasaki made her second appearance for RIZIN, this time fighting the current DEEP Jewels Atomweight Champion, Mina Kurobe. UFC veterans Daron Cruickshank and Diego Brandao faced off in a lightweight bout.

Mirko Cro Cop returned after a 4-month injury lay-off against DEEP Megaton Champion, Roque Martinez. The first African professional sumo wrestler, Osunaarashi, fought fan-favorite Bob Sapp. The card was headlined by kickboxing sensation Tenshin Nasukawa and Bantamweight Grand Prix Champion Kyoji Horiguchi, in a kickboxing rules bout.

=== Results ===
Rizin 13
Weight Class				Method	Round	T.Time	Notes
Light Heavyweight 93 kg	(Czech Republic) Jiří Procházka	def.	(United States) Jake Heun	TKO (Punches)	1	4:29	
Featherweight 66 kg	(Japan) Mikuru Asakura	def.	(Kazakhstan) Karshyga Dautbek	Decision (Unanimous)	3	15:00	
Lightweight 70 kg	(United States) Daron Cruickshank	def.	(Brazil) Diego Brandao	KO (Flying Knee)	2	5:17	
Flyweight 57 kg	(Japan) Tenshin Nasukawa	def.	(Japan) Kyoji Horiguchi	Decision (Unanimous)	3	9:00	Kickboxing bout
Super Atomweight 49 kg	(Japan) Miyuu Yamamoto	def.	(United States) Andy Nguyen	Decision (Unanimous)	3	15:00	
Heavyweight 120 kg	(Croatia) Mirko Filipovic	def.	(Guam) Roque Martinez	TKO (Cut)	1	4:58	
Openweight	(United States) Bob Sapp	def.	(Egypt) Osunaarashi	Decision (Unanimous)	3	9:00	Special Rules bout
Strawweight 53 kg	(Japan) Haruo Ochi	def.	(Japan) Mitsuhisa Sunabe	KO (Soccer Kicks)	3	12:51	
Catchweight 59 kg	(Japan) Kai Asakura	def.	(Thailand) Topnoi Thanongsaklek	Decision (Unanimous)	3	15:00	
Super Atomweight 49 kg	(Japan) Ayaka Hamasaki	def.	(Japan) Mina Kurobe	Submission (Kimura)	1	4:45	
Catchweight 59 kg	(Japan) Taiga		(Japan) Kento Haraguchi	Draw (Majority)	3	9:00	Kickboxing bout
Catchweight 58 kg	(Angola) Manel Kape	def.	(Japan) Yusaku Nakamura	Submission (Rear-Naked Choke)	3	14:27	

== Rizin - Heisei's Last Yarennoka! ==
Rizin - Heisei's Last Yarennoka!
- Promotion: Rizin Fighting Federation
- Date: December 31, 2018
- Venue: Saitama Super Arena
- City: Saitama, Japan

Rizin - Heisei's Last Yarennoka! was a mixed martial arts event held by the Rizin Fighting Federation on December 31, 2018 at the Saitama Super Arena in Saitama, Japan.

=== Background ===
The card was headlined by former Sengoku, Deep and Pancrase champion Satoru Kitaoka who takes on former Shooto champion Tatsuya Kawajiri in a three-round Lightweight match.

=== Results ===
Rizin Heisei's Last Yarennoka!
Weight Class				Method	Round	T.Time	Notes
Lightweight 70 kg	(Japan) Satoru Kitaoka	def.	(Japan) Tatsuya Kawajiri	Decision (Split)	3	15:00	
Catchweight 68 kg	(Japan) Mikuru Asakura	def.	(Japan) Takeshi Inoue	TKO (Flying Knee and Punch)	2	7:39	
Flyweight 57 kg	(Japan) Kana Watanabe	def.	(Japan) Shizuka Sugiyama	TKO (Punch)	1	0:11	
Bantamweight 61 kg	(Japan) Kai Asakura	def.	(South Korea) Jae Hoon Moon	Decision (Unanimous)	3	15:00	
Catchweight 64 kg	(Japan) Taiju Shiratori	def.	(Japan) Yoshiya Uzatsuyo	TKO (Flying Knee)	3	7:43	Kickboxing bout
Catchweight 92 kg	(Japan) Yuta Uchida	def.	(Japan) Takuma Konishi	Decision (Unanimous)	3	9:00	Kickboxing bout
Super Atomweight 49 kg	(Japan) Ai	def.	(Japan) Nanaka Kawamura	TKO (Punches)	1	3:01	

== Rizin 14 - Saitama ==
Rizin 14 - Saitama
- Promotion: Rizin Fighting Federation
- Date: December 31, 2018
- Venue: Saitama Super Arena
- City: Saitama, Japan

Rizin 14 - Saitama was a mixed martial arts event held by the Rizin Fighting Federation on December 31, 2018 at the Saitama Super Arena in Saitama, Japan.

=== Background ===
The card was headlined by kickboxing sensation Tenshin Nasukawa, who took on multiple weight world boxing champion Floyd Mayweather Jr. in a three-round exhibition boxing match. The match was controversial and drew accusations of match-fixing from both fans and pundits alike.

Emanuel Newton was to face Jiří Procházka at this event, but had to withdraw due to an injury. He was replaced by Brandon Halsey.

Rena Kubota was to face Samantha Jean-Francois at this event, but had to withdraw due to Anemia and dehydration. The fight was canceled.

=== Results ===
Rizin 14
Weight Class				Method	Round	T.Time	Notes
Catchweight 66.6 kg	(United States) Floyd Mayweather Jr.	def.	(Japan) Tenshin Nasukawa	TKO (Corner Stoppage)	1	2:19	Exhibition boxing match
Bantamweight 61 kg	(Japan) Kyoji Horiguchi	def.	(United States) Darrion Caldwell	Submission (Guillotine Choke)	3	11:13	For the inaugural Rizin Bantamweight Championship
Super Atomweight 49 kg	(Japan) Ayaka Hamasaki	def.	(Japan) Kanna Asakura	Submission (Armbar)	2	9:34	For the inaugural Rizin Super Atomweight Championship
Light Heavyweight 93 kg	(Czech Republic) Jiří Procházka	def.	(United States) Brandon Halsey	Submission (Punches)	1	6:30	
Catchweight 102.5 kg	(Brazil) Gabi Garcia	def.	(Brazil) Barbara Nepomuceno	Submission (Keylock)	1	2:35	
Lightweight 70 kg	(Australia) Damien Brown	def.	(United States) Daron Cruickshank	Submission (Guillotine Choke)	1	4:10	
Catchweight 51 kg	(Japan) Miyuu Yamamoto	def.	(Japan) Mika Nagano	Decision (Unanimous)	3	15:00	
Featherweight 65 kg	(Japan) Kazuyuki Miyata	def.	(Japan) Erson Yamamoto	Submission (Hammerlock)	2	8:23	
Lightweight 70 kg	(United States) Johnny Case	def.	(Japan) Yusuke Yachi	TKO (Cut)	2	9:47	
Catchweight 60 kg	(Japan) Yuki Motoya	def.	(United States) Justin Scoggins	Submission (Teepee Choke)	1	3:28	
Catchweight 59 kg	(Japan) Ulka Sasaki	def.	(Angola) Manel Kape	Decision (Unanimous)	3	15:00	
Flyweight 57 kg	(Poland) Justyna Haba	def.	(United States) Shinju Nozawa Auclair	Submission (Rear-Naked Choke)	2	8:41	
Lightweight 70 kg	(Azerbaijan) Tofiq Musayev	def.	(Japan) Nobumitsu Osawa	TKO (Punches)	2	6:19	
