= 2019 in Rizin Fighting Federation =

Information
- First date: April 21, 2019
- Last date: December 31, 2019

Events
- Total events: 6

Fights
- Total fights: 79
- Title fights: 6

Chronology
2018 in Rizin Fighting Federation	2019 in Rizin Fighting Federation	2020 in Rizin Fighting Federation

The year 2019 was the fifth year in the history of the Rizin Fighting Federation, a mixed martial arts promotion based in Japan. The year began with Rizin 15 in Yokohama on April 21, 2019.

Rizin events are broadcast through a television agreement with Fuji Television. In North America and Europe, Rizin events are available via PPV on FITE TV.

== Background ==
Nobuyuki Sakakibara announced that Rizin will do 6 events in 2019: April, June, July, August, October, and the usual December 31 show.

He also announced that they will do a lightweight Grand Prix this year. Bellator MMA CEO Scott Coker has announced that he will be sending Patricky Freire to participate in the opening round.

Rizin's Lightweight grand prix will begin on October 12 at the Osaka-jo Hall, with the four opening rounds bouts of the tournament bracket. The semifinals and finals will be held on Dec. 31, at Saitama Super Arena.

== List of events ==
#	Event	Date	Venue	Location	Attendance
1	Rizin 15 - Yokohama	April 21, 2019	Yokohama Arena	Yokohama, Japan	12,914
2	Rizin 16 - Kobe	June 2, 2019	World Memorial Hall	Kobe, Japan	8,107
3	Rizin 17 - Saitama	July 28, 2019	Saitama Super Arena	Saitama, Japan	16,930
4	Rizin 18 - Nagoya	August 18, 2019	Aichi Prefectural Gymnasium	Nagoya, Japan	6,281
5	Rizin 19 - Osaka	October 12, 2019	Edion Arena	Osaka, Japan	5,098
6	Rizin 20 - Saitama	December 31, 2019	Saitama Super Arena	Saitama, Japan	29,315

== Title fights ==
Title fights in 2019
#	Weight Class				Method	Round	Time	Event	Notes
1	Light Heavyweight 93 kg	(Czech Republic) Jiří Procházka	def.	(United States) Muhammed Lawal	TKO (Punches)	3	13:02	Rizin 15	For the inaugural Rizin Light Heavyweight Championship
2	Super Atomweight 49 kg	(Japan) Ayaka Hamasaki (c)	def.	(United States) Jinh Yu Frey	Decision (Unanimous)	3	15:00	Rizin 16	For the Rizin Super Atomweight Championship
3	Featherweight 57 kg	(Japan) Tenshin Nasukawa	def.	(Argentina) Martin Blanco	KO (Knee to the Body)	2	5:19	Rizin 16	For the ISKA Featherweight Championship
4	Light Heavyweight 93 kg	(Czech Republic) Jiří Procházka (c)	def.	(United States) C. B. Dollaway	KO (Punches)	1	1:55	Rizin 20	For the Rizin Light Heavyweight Championship
5	Super Atomweight 49 kg	(South Korea) Seo Hee Ham	def.	(Japan) Ayaka Hamasaki (c)	Decision (Split)	3	15:00	Rizin 20	For the Rizin Super Atomweight Championship
6	Bantamweight 61 kg	(Angola) Manel Kape	def.	(Japan) Kai Asakura	TKO (Punches)	2	5:38	Rizin 20	For the vacant Rizin Bantamweight Championship

== Rizin Lightweight Grand Prix ==
=== 8-Man Lightweight Grand Prix Participant ===
- (Japan) Hiroto Uesako
- (Australia) Damien Brown
- (United States) Johnny Case
- (Brazil) Patricky Freire
- (Brazil) Roberto de Souza
- (Japan) Tatsuya Kawajiri
- (Brazil) Luiz Gustavo

=== Rizin Lightweight Grand Prix bracket ===
1st Round
(Azerbaijan) Tofiq Musayev	TKO
(Australia) Damien Brown	1R.
(United States) Johnny Case	TKO
(Brazil) Roberto de Souza	1R.
(Brazil) Patricky Freire	TKO
(Japan) Tatsuya Kawajiri	1R.
(Brazil) Luiz Gustavo	TKO
(Japan) Hiroto Uesako	1R.

Semifinals
(Azerbaijan) Tofiq Musayev	TKO
(United States) Johnny Case	1R.
(Brazil) Patricky Freire	TKO
(Brazil) Luiz Gustavo	1R.

Final
(Azerbaijan) Tofiq Musayev	UD
(Brazil) Patricky Freire	3R.

== Rizin 15 - Yokohama ==
Rizin 15 - Yokohama
- Promotion: Rizin Fighting Federation
- Date: April 21, 2019
- Venue: Yokohama Arena
- City: Yokohama, Japan

Rizin 15 - Yokohama was a Combat sport event held by the Rizin Fighting Federation on April 21, 2019 at the Yokohama Arena in Yokohama, Japan.

=== Background ===
A light heavyweight bout between RIZIN top contender Jiří Procházka and former Strikeforce Light Heavyweight champion Muhammed Lawal will serve as the Rizin 15 - Yokohama main event. The bout will crown the inaugural RIZIN Light Heavyweight champion.

Ulka Sasaki has been forced to withdraw from his schedule fight against Kai Asakura due to a visceral infection and Justin Scoggins has stepped in as a replacement. Unfortunately, Scoggins has suffered a knee injury during training and has been unable to compete, that forced his fight against Kai Asakura to be cancelled.

Shinju Nozawa-Auclair was supposed to face Saray Orozco. However, Nozawa-Auclair suffered an ankle injury during training and was forced to withdraw from the fight. Kanako Murata has stepped in on short notice against Orozco.

=== Results ===
Rizin 15
Weight Class				Method	Round	T.Time	Notes
Light Heavyweight 93 kg	(Czech Republic) Jiří Procházka	def.	(United States) Muhammed Lawal	TKO (Punches)	3	13:02	For the inaugural Rizin Light Heavyweight Championship
Catchweight 59 kg	(Japan) Tenshin Nasukawa	def.	(Philippines) Fritz Aldin Biagtan	TKO (3 Knockdown Rule)	3	7:24	Kickboxing
Intermission
Catchweight 60 kg	(Japan) Kyoji Horiguchi	def.	(United States) Ben Nguyen	TKO (Punches)	1	2:53	
Catchweight 71 kg	(Brazil) Roberto de Souza	def.	(Japan) Satoru Kitaoka	TKO (Punches)	2	8:56	
Light Heavyweight 93 kg	(Sweden) Karl Albrektsson	def.	(Brazil) Christiano Frohlich	Decision (Unanimous)	3	15:00	
Catchweight 51 kg	(Japan) Rena Kubota	def.	(France) Samantha Jean-Francois	Decision (Unanimous)	3	15:00	
Catchweight 68 kg	(Japan) Mikuru Asakura	def.	(Brazil) Luiz Gustavo	Decision (Unanimous)	3	15:00	
Flyweight 57 kg	(Japan) Kana Watanabe	def.	(Poland) Justyna Haba	Decision (Unanimous)	3	15:00	
Lightweight 70 kg	(Australia) Damien Brown	def.	(Japan) Koji Takeda	Decision (Unanimous)	3	15:00	
Flyweight 58 kg	(Angola) Manel Kape	def.	(Japan) Seiichiro Ito	TKO (Punches)	2	8:59	
Flyweight 57 kg	(Japan) Kanako Murata	def.	(Mexico) Saray Orozco	Submission (Von Flue choke)	2	7:12	
Bantamweight 61 kg	(Brazil) Thalisson Gomes Ferreira	def.	(Japan) Taiga	TKO (3 Knockdown Rule)	2	5:34	Kickboxing

== Rizin 16 - Kobe ==
Rizin 16 - Kobe
- Promotion: Rizin Fighting Federation
- Date: June 2, 2019
- Venue: World Memorial Hall
- City: Kobe, Japan

Rizin 16 - Kobe was a Combat sport event held by the Rizin Fighting Federation on June 2, 2019 at the World Memorial Hall in Kobe, Japan.

=== Background ===
ISKA Featherweight Ahmed Ferradji was scheduled to defend his title against Tenshin Nasukawa at RIZIN 16, but Ferradji withdrew from the scheduled fight. As a result, ISKA has stripped the title from Ferradji and ISKA Bantamweight Champion Martin Blanco has stepped in on short notice to face Nasukawa for the vacant ISKA Featherweight World Title.

Kizaemon Saiga was scheduled to face Kunitaka Fujiwara at RIZIN 16, but was not medically cleared for the event due to vision issues. Stepping in on a few days' notice to fight Fujiwara was the former K-1 Krush champion Ryuji Horio.

=== Results ===
Rizin 16
Weight Class				Method	Round	T.Time	Notes
Featherweight 57 kg	(Japan) Tenshin Nasukawa	def.	(Argentina) Martin Blanco	KO (Knee to the Body)	2	5:19	For the ISKA Featherweight Championship
Super Atomweight 49 kg	(Japan) Ayaka Hamasaki (c)	def.	(United States) Jinh Yu Frey	Decision (Unanimous)	3	15:00	For the Rizin Super Atomweight Championship
Super Atomweight 49 kg	(Japan) Miyuu Yamamoto	def.	(Japan) Kanna Asakura	Decision (Unanimous)	3	15:00	
Intermission
Heavyweight 120 kg	(United States) Jake Heun	def.	(Guam) Roque Martinez	Decision (Split)	3	15:00	
Flyweight 57 kg	(Japan) Yusaku Nakamura	def.	(Thailand) Topnoi Thanongsaklek	Decision (Unanimous)	3	15:00	
Lightweight 71 kg	(Azerbaijan) Tofiq Musayev	def.	(United States) Daron Cruickshank	Decision (Unanimous)	3	15:00	
Intermission
Bantamweight 61 kg	(Japan) Mamoru Uoi	def.	(United States) Kana Hayatt	TKO (Punches and Soccer Kicks)	3	14:32	
Catchweight 59 kg	(Japan) Ryuji Horio	def.	(Japan) Kunitaka Fujiwara	Decision (Unanimous)	3	9:00	Kickboxing
Bantamweight 61 kg	(Japan) Erson Yamamoto	def.	(United States) Tim Eschtruth	KO (Elbow and Punches)	1	2:04	
Catchweight 63 kg	(Japan) Taiju Shiratori	def.	(Japan) Hiroto Yamaguchi	Decision (Unanimous)	3	9:00	Kickboxing
Catchweight 59 kg	(Japan) Takaki Soya	def.	(Japan) Namiki Kawahara	KO (Punch and Soccer Kick)	1	4:05	
Catchweight 60 kg	(Japan) Kan Nakamura	def.	(Japan) Itto	KO (Head Kick)	2	3:18	Kickboxing
Catchweight 56 kg	(Japan) Seiki Ueyama	def.	(Japan) Kengo	TKO (3 Knockdown Rule)	1	2:42	Kickboxing
Catchweight 69 kg	(Japan) Yuya	def.	(Japan) Yuki Tanaka	TKO (3 Knockdown Rule)	1	2:45	Kickboxing

== Rizin 17 - Saitama ==
Rizin 17 - Saitama
- Promotion: Rizin Fighting Federation
- Date: July 28, 2019
- Venue: Saitama Super Arena
- City: Saitama, Japan

Rizin 17 - Saitama was a Combat sport event held by the Rizin Fighting Federation on July 28, 2019 at the Saitama Super Arena in Saitama, Japan.

=== Background ===
Daiki Watabe was due to fight Kevin Ross in a kickboxing bout, but the American fighter withdrew due to a hand injury. Watabe instead faced the Bolivian fighter Hideki, who stepped in on 3 weeks notice for this encounter.

=== Results ===
Rizin 17
Weight Class				Method	Round	T.Time	Notes
Lightweight 70 kg	(Japan) Mikuru Asakura	def.	(Japan) Yusuke Yachi	Decision (Unanimous)	3	15:00	
Bantamweight 61 kg	(Japan) Shintaro Ishiwatari	def.	(Japan) Ulka Sasaki	Submission (North-South Choke	2	8:57	
Bantamweight 61 kg	(Japan) Hiromasa Ougikubo	def.	(Japan) Yuki Motoya	Decision (Split)	3	15:00	
Light Heavyweight 93 kg	(Russia) Ivan Shtyrkov	def.	(South Korea) Hoon Kim	TKO (Punches)	2	9:05	
Catchweight 62 kg	(Japan) Taiga	def.	(Japan) Hikaru Machida	Decision (Unanimous)	3	9:00	Kickboxing
Intermission
Lightweight 71 kg	(United States) Johnny Case	def.	(Japan) Satoru Kitaoka	TKO (Retirement)	1	5:00	Lightweight GP Qualifying Round
Lightweight 71 kg	(Japan) Tatsuya Kawajiri	def.	(Russia) Ali Abdulkhalikov	Decision (Unanimous)	3	15:00	Lightweight GP Qualifying Round
Lightweight 71 kg	(Brazil) Roberto de Souza	def.	(Japan) Mizuto Hirota	KO (Punches)	1	3:04	Lightweight GP Qualifying Round
Light Heavyweight 93 kg	(United States) Jake Heun	def.	(Russia) Vitaly Shemetov	TKO (Cut)	3	12:20	
Super Atomweight 49 kg	(South Korea) Seo Hee Ham	def.	(Japan) Tomo Maesawa	TKO (Knees)	1	3:12	
Catchweight 63 kg	(Switzerland) Stephanie Egger	def.	(Japan) Reina Miura	Decision (Unanimous)	3	15:00	
Catchweight 67 kg	(Bolivia) Hideki	def.	(Japan) Daiki Watabe	Decision (Majority)	3	9:00	Kickboxing

== Rizin 18 - Nagoya ==
Rizin 18 - Nagoya
- Promotion: Rizin Fighting Federation
- Date: August 18, 2019
- Venue: Aichi Prefectural Gymnasium
- City: Nagoya, Japan

Rizin 18 - Nagoya was a Combat sport event held by the Rizin Fighting Federation on August 18, 2019 at the Aichi Prefectural Gymnasium in Nagoya, Japan.

=== Background ===
Marcos de Souza, was set to fight at RIZIN 18, but his debut was pushed back because of an injury.

Kazuma Sone was expected to face Erson Yamamoto, But plans have changed for undisclosed reasons. That forced the fight to be cancelled. Justin Scoggins has stepped in as a replacement.

=== Results ===
Rizin 18
Weight Class				Method	Round	T.Time	Notes
Bantamweight 61 kg	(Japan) Kai Asakura	def.	(Japan) Kyoji Horiguchi	KO (Punches)	1	1:07	
Super Atomweight 49 kg	(Japan) Ayaka Hamasaki	def.	(Thailand) Suwanan Boonsorn	Submission (Armbar)	1	3:20	
Bantamweight 61 kg	(United States) Victor Henry	def.	(Australia) Trent Girdham	Submission (Inverted Triangle Choke)	3	12:14	
Bantamweight 61 kg	(Angola) Manel Kape	def.	(Japan) Takeya Mizugaki	KO (punch)	2	6:35	
Catchweight 75 kg	(Brazil) Danilo Zanolini	def.	(Australia) John Wayne Parr	Decision (Split)	3	9:00	Kickboxing
Intermission
Super Atomweight 49 kg	(Japan) Kanna Asakura	def.	(United States) Alesha Zappitella	Decision (Split)	3	15:00	
Strawweight 53 kg	(Japan) Haruo Ochi	vs.	(United States) Jarred Brooks	No Contest (Accidental Headbutt)	1	0:11	
Lightweight 71 kg	(Japan) Hiroto Uesako	def.	(France) Yves Landu	TKO (Punches)	2	8:45	Lightweight GP Qualifying Round
Bantamweight 61 kg	(United States) Justin Scoggins	def.	(Japan) Kazuma Sone	Decision (Unanimous)	3	15:00	
Catchweight 59 kg	(Japan) Takaki Soya	def.	(Japan) Yutaro Muramoto	TKO (Punches)	2	6:27	
Super Atomweight 49 kg	(Japan) Ai Shimizu	def.	(United States) Tabatha Watkins	Decision (Unanimous)	3	15:00	
Strawweight 53 kg	(Japan) Kazuki Osaki	def.	(Japan) Shota Takiya	Decision (Unanimous)	3	9:00	Kickboxing
Flyweight 57 kg	(Japan) Ryuji Horio	def.	(Japan) Uchu Sakurai	Decision (Unanimous)	3	9:00	Kickboxing

== Rizin 19 - Osaka ==
Rizin 19 - Osaka
- Promotion: Rizin Fighting Federation
- Date: October 12, 2019
- Venue: Edion Arena
- City: Osaka, Japan

Rizin 19 - Osaka was a Combat sport event held by the Rizin Fighting Federation on October 12, 2019 at the Edion Arena in Osaka, Japan.

=== Background ===
Rena Kubota's original opponent, Shawna Ram suffered a concussion during training. Alexandra Alvare steps in to face Kubota.

Shintaro Matsukura originally supposed to face Takuma Konishi but he suffered an eye injury. His teammate, Hiroya, will be the replacement to face Konishi.

=== Results ===
Rizin 19
Weight Class				Method	Round	T.Time	Notes
Catchweight 100 kg	(Czech Republic) Jiří Procházka	def.	(Brazil) Fábio Maldonado	TKO (Punches)	1	1:49	
Bantamweight 61 kg	(Japan) Kai Asakura	def.	(Japan) Ulka Sasaki	TKO (Doctor Stoppage)	1	0:54	
Super Atomweight 49 kg	(South Korea) Seo Hee Ham	def.	(Japan) Miyuu Yamamoto	TKO (Punches)	2	9:42	
Catchweight 51 kg	(Japan) Rena Kubota	def.	(Spain) Alexandra Alvare	TKO (Punches)	1	0:20	
Intermission
Lightweight 71 kg	(United States) Johnny Case	def.	(Brazil) Roberto de Souza	TKO (Punches)	1	1:15	Lightweight Grand Prix Quarter-Finals
Lightweight 71 kg	(Brazil) Patricky Freire	def.	(Japan) Tatsuya Kawajiri	TKO (Knee and Punches)	1	1:10	Lightweight Grand Prix Quarter-Finals
Lightweight 71 kg	(Brazil) Luiz Gustavo	def.	(Japan) Hiroto Uesako	TKO (Doctor Stoppage)	1	3:55	Lightweight Grand Prix Quarter-Finals
Lightweight 71 kg	(Azerbaijan) Tofiq Musayev	def.	(Australia) Damien Brown	TKO (Punches)	1	4:14	Lightweight Grand Prix Quarter-Finals
Welterweight 77 kg	(Japan) Keita Nakamura	def.	(Brazil) Marcos de Souza	TKO (Punches)	1	1:18	
Catchweight 62 kg	(Japan) Taiju Shiratori	def.	(Japan) Taiga	Decision (Unanimous)	3	9:00	Kickboxing
Welterweight 77 kg	(Japan) Takuma Konishi	def.	(Japan) Hiroya	TKO (Knee)	1	1:20	Kickboxing
Openweight	(Japan) Shoma Shibisai	def.	(South Korea) Chang Hee Kim	Submission (Kimura)	1	1:09	
Catchweight 56 kg	(Japan) Seiki Ueyama	def.	(Japan) Taisei Umei	Decision (Unanimous)	3	9:00	Kickboxing

== Rizin 20 - Saitama ==
Rizin 20 - Saitama
- Promotion: Rizin Fighting Federation
- Date: December 31, 2019
- Venue: Saitama Super Arena
- City: Saitama, Japan

Rizin 20 - Saitama was a Combat sport event by Rizin Fighting Federation that took place on December 31, 2019 at the Saitama Super Arena in Saitama, Japan.

=== Background ===
Kyoji Horiguchi was scheduled to defend his RIZIN Bantamweight Championship against Kai Asakura on this card. However, Horoguchi pulled out of the fight in mid-November citing a knee injury that is expected to keep him out of action for approximately 10 – 12 months. In turn, his bantamweight title has been vacated.

=== Results ===
Rizin 20
Weight Class				Method	Round	T.Time	Notes
Bantamweight 61 kg	(Angola) Manel Kape	def.	(Japan) Kai Asakura	TKO (Punches)	2	5:38	For the vacant Rizin Bantamweight Championship
Catchweight 56 kg	(Japan) Tenshin Nasukawa	def.	(Japan) Rui Ebata	TKO (3 Knockdown Rule)	1	2:44	Kickboxing
Super Atomweight 49 kg	(South Korea) Seo Hee Ham	def.	(Japan) Ayaka Hamasaki (c)	Decision (Split)	3	15:00	For the Rizin Super Atomweight Championship
Featherweight 66 kg	(Japan) Mikuru Asakura	def.	(Brazil) John Teixeira	Decision (Unanimous)	3	15:00	
Catchweight 50.8 kg	(Japan) Rena Kubota	def.	(United States) Lindsey VanZandt	TKO (Corner Stoppage)	3	14:42	
Intermission
Lightweight 71 kg	(Azerbaijan) Tofiq Musayev	def.	(Brazil) Patricky Freire	Decision (Unanimous)	3	15:00	Lightweight Grand Prix Final
Light Heavyweight 93 kg	(Czech Republic) Jiří Procházka (c)	def.	(United States) C. B. Dollaway	KO (Punches)	1	1:55	For the Rizin Light Heavyweight Championship
Light Heavyweight 93 kg	(Cameroon) Simon Biyong	def.	(Russia) Vitaly Shemetov	TKO (Elbows and Punches)	2	0:58	
Bantamweight 61 kg	(Japan) Hiromasa Ougikubo	def.	(Japan) Shintaro Ishiwatari	Decision (Split)	3	15:00	
Intermission
Catchweight 105 kg	(United States) Jake Heun	def.	(Japan) Satoshi Ishii	TKO (Punches)	1	1:12	
Bantamweight 61 kg	(United States) Patchy Mix	def.	(Japan) Yuki Motoya	Submission (Guillotine Choke)	1	1:36	
Catchweight 62 kg	(Japan) Taiju Shiratori	def.	(Japan) Taiga	TKO (Cut)	2	6:00	Kickboxing
Super Atomweight 49 kg	(Japan) Miyuu Yamamoto	def.	(Thailand) Suwanan Boonsorn	Decision (Unanimous)	3	15:00	
Lightweight 71 kg	(Brazil) Patricky Freire	def.	(Brazil) Luiz Gustavo	TKO (Punches and Soccer Kick)	1	0:28	Lightweight Grand Prix Semi-Finals
Lightweight 71 kg	(Azerbaijan) Tofiq Musayev	def.	(United States) Johnny Case	TKO (Punches)	1	2:46	Lightweight Grand Prix Semi-Finals
