= 2022 in Rizin Fighting Federation =

Information

Events

Fights

Chronology
2021 in Rizin Fighting Federation	2022 in Rizin Fighting Federation	2023 in Rizin Fighting Federation

The year 2022 was the eighth year in the history of the Rizin Fighting Federation, a mixed martial arts promotion based in Japan.

Rizin events were broadcast through a television agreement with Fuji Television. However, due to several controversies, the promotion would be dropped by the network by May of that year. Rizin would since begin broadcasting on events via PPV on their new streaming service, RIZIN STREAM PASS, and various other streaming platforms in Japan.

In North America and Europe, Rizin events were available via PPV on LIVENow. Starting with Super Rizin & Rizin 38 in 2022, Integrated Sports would produce English-language PPVs of Rizin events for FITE.

== Background ==
Nobuyuki Sakakibara announced that Rizin is planning to work in co-promotion with K-1 and RISE to hold an event headlined by between Tenshin Nasukawa and Takeru Segawa. Known as THE MATCH 2022, the event would be held on June 19, 2022.

== List of events ==
Rizin Fighting Federation
#	Event	Date	Venue	Location	Attendance
1	Rizin Trigger 2	February 23, 2022	Ecopa Arena	Fukuroi, Japan	
2	Rizin Landmark 2	March 6, 2022	—N/a	Japan	
3	Rizin 34 – Osaka	March 20, 2022	Maruzen Intec Arena	Osaka, Japan	22,449
4	Rizin Trigger 3	April 16, 2022	Musashino Forest Sport Plaza	Chōfu, Japan	6,515
5	Rizin 35 - Chōfu	April 17, 2022	Musashino Forest Sport Plaza	Chōfu, Japan	8,935
6	Rizin Landmark 3	May 5, 2022	—N/a	Japan	
7	The Match 2022	June 19, 2022	Tokyo Dome	Tokyo, Japan	56,399
8	Rizin 36 - Okinawa	July 2, 2022	Okinawa Arena	Okinawa, Japan	7,264
9	Rizin 37 - Saitama	July 31, 2022	Saitama Super Arena	Saitama, Japan	11,166
10	Super Rizin & Rizin 38	September 25, 2022	Saitama Super Arena	Saitama, Japan	
11	Rizin 39	October 23, 2022	Marine Messe Fukuoka	Fukuoka, Japan	
12	Rizin Landmark Vol.4	November 6, 2022	Dolphins Arena	Nagoya, Japan	
13	Rizin 40: Rizin X Bellator	December 31, 2022	Saitama Super Arena	Saitama, Japan	23,661

== Rizin Women's Super Atomweight Grand Prix 2022 bracket ==
1st Round; Rizin 37
(Japan) Seika Izawa	SUB
(Brazil) Laura Fontoura	1
(Japan) Rena Kubota	UD
(Ukraine) Anastasiya Svetkivska	3
(Japan) Ayaka Hamasaki	UD
(Mexico) Jessica Aguilar	3
(Japan) Kanna Asakura	3
(South Korea) Si Woo Park	UD

Semifinals; Super Rizin & Rizin 38
(Japan) Seika Izawa	SUB
(Ukraine) Anastasiya Svetkivska^{1}	2
(Japan) Ayaka Hamasaki	3
(South Korea) Si Woo Park	UD

Final
(Japan) Seika Izawa	SD
(South Korea) Si Woo Park	3

^{1} Anastasiya Svetkivska replaced an injured Rena Kubota.

== Rizin Trigger 2 ==
Rizin Trigger 2
- Promotion: Rizin Fighting Federation
- Date: February 23, 2022
- Venue: Ecopa Arena
- City: Fukuroi, Japan

Event chronology
Rizin 33	Rizin Trigger 2

Rizin Trigger 2 was a Combat sport event held by Rizin Fighting Federation on February 23, 2022, at the Ecopa Arena in Fukuroi, Japan.

=== Background ===
A featherweight bout between Kleber Koike Erbst and Ulka Sasaki was scheduled as the event headliner.

=== Results ===
Rizin Trigger 2
Weight Class				Method	Round	T.Time	Notes
Featherweight 66 kg	(Japan) Kleber Koike Erbst	def.	(Japan) Ulka Sasaki	Submission (Rear-Naked Choke)	2	3:22	
Bantamweight 61 kg	(Japan) Kazuma Kuramoto	def.	(Japan) Kenji Kato	TKO (Knees)	1	4:16	
Lightweight 71 kg	(Japan) Akira Okada	def.	(Japan) Takumi Suzuki	Decision (Unanimous)	3	5:00	
Featherweight 66 kg	(Japan) Sora Yamamoto	def.	(Japan) Suguru Nii	TKO (Knees and Punches)	1	0:35	
Intermission
Catchweight 73 kg	(Japan) Kohei Tokeshi	def.	(Brazil) Harry Stallone	KO (Punch)	2	3:31	
Catchweight 100 kg	(Japan) Ryugo	def.	(Japan) Sasada Katsutoshi	TKO (Three Knockdowns)	1	2:38	Kickboxing
Catchweight 62 kg	(Japan) Hikaru Yoshino	def.	(Japan) Daisuke Endo	Decision (Unanimous)	3	5:00	
Featherweight 66 kg	(Japan) Kouki Nakagawa	def.	(Japan) Katsushi Kojima	Decision (Unanimous)	3	5:00	
Bantamweight 61 kg	(Japan) Takuma Uchiyama	def.	(Japan) Kotetsu Hara	Decision (Split)	3	5:00	
Featherweight 65 kg	(Japan) Koki Takeuchi	def.	(Japan) Yuuki Kitagawa	Decision (Unanimous)	3	3:00	Kickboxing
Catchweight 58 kg	(Japan) Taiki Matsui	def.	(Japan) Masanari	Decision (Unanimous)	3	3:00	Kickboxing
Catchweight 59 kg	(Japan) Taiki Sawatani	def.	(Japan) Kota Nakagawa	Decision (Unanimous)	3	3:00	Kickboxing
Catchweight 60 kg	(Japan) Momoto	def.	(Japan) Yudai Ito	TKO (Doctor Stoppage)	2	0:13	Kickboxing

== Rizin Landmark 2 ==
Rizin Landmark 2
- Promotion: Rizin Fighting Federation
- Date: March 6, 2022
- Venue: TBA
- City: Japan

Rizin Landmark 2 was a Combat sport event held by Rizin Fighting Federation on March 6, 2022, in Japan.

=== Background ===
A featherweight bout between Chihiro Suzuki and the Ren Hiramoto is scheduled as the event headliner.

=== Results ===
Rizin Landmark 2
Weight Class				Method	Round	T.Time	Notes
Featherweight 66 kg	(Japan) Chihiro Suzuki	def.	(Japan) Ren Hiramoto	Decision (Unanimous)	3	5:00	
Featherweight 66 kg	(Japan) Hiroaki Suzuki	def.	(Japan) Shoji Maruyama	TKO (Punch and Soccer Kick)	1	1:12	
Catchweight 52.5 kg	(Japan) Nadaka Yoshinari	def.	(Japan) Yusei Shirahata	KO (punch)	2	1:01	Kickboxing
Bantamweight 61 kg	(Japan) Kuya Ito	def.	(Japan) Mamoru Uoi	Decision (Unanimous)	3	5:00	
Catchweight 63 kg	(Japan) Kosuke Terashima	def.	(Japan) Takuma Masuda	Decision (Split)	3	5:00	

== Rizin 34 – Osaka ==
Rizin 34 – Osaka
- Promotion: Rizin Fighting Federation
- Date: March 20, 2022
- Venue: Maruzen Intec Arena
- City: Osaka, Japan
- Attendance: 22,449

Rizin 34 – Osaka was a Combat sport event held by Rizin Fighting Federation on March 20, 2022, at the Maruzen Intec Arena in Osaka, Japan.

With this event, Rizin reaches the same total of numbered events as PRIDE FC did at the time of its final show.

=== Background ===
A featherweight bout between Satoshi Yamasu and Kyohei Hagiwara was scheduled as the event headliner.

A bantamweight kickboxing bout between Taiga Kawabe and Ryo Takahashi was scheduled for the event.

=== Results ===
Rizin 34
Weight Class				Method	Round	T.Time	Notes
Featherweight 66 kg	(Japan) Satoshi Yamasu	def.	(Japan) Kyohei Hagiwara	Submission (Triangle Choke)	1	3:21	
Bantamweight 61 kg	(Japan) Kouzi	def.	(Japan) Genji Umeno	Decision (Majority)	3	3:00	Kickboxing
Catchweight 68 kg	(Japan) Sora Yamamoto	def.	(Japan) Daisuke Nakamura	Decision (Split)	3	5:00	
Welterweight 77 kg	(Japan) Daichi Abe	def.	(Japan) Kiichi Kunimoto	Decision (Unanimous)	3	5:00	
Flyweight 57 kg	(Japan) Daichi Kitakata	def.	(Japan) Yutaro Muramoto	Decision (Unanimous)	3	5:00	
Lightweight 71 kg	(Japan) Juri Ohara	def.	(Japan) Akira Okada	Decision (Split)	3	5:00	
Intermission
Bantamweight 61 kg	(Japan) Taiga Kawabe	-	(Japan) Ryo Takahashi	Draw (Majority)	3	3:00	Kickboxing
Bantamweight 61 kg	(Brazil) Alan Yamaniha	def.	(Japan) Motonobu Tezuka	Submission (Rear-Naked Choke)	2	3:25	
Flyweight 57 kg	(Japan) Tatsuki Saomoto	def.	(Japan) Yuto Uda	Decision (Split)	3	5:00	
Catchweight 60 kg	(Japan) Ryuya Fukuda	def.	(Japan) Masayuki Watanabe	KO (Punches)	1	0:54	
Lightweight 70 kg	(Japan) Yuya	def.	(Japan) Yousuke Yamato	TKO (Referee Stoppage)	2	2:51	Kickboxing
Bantamweight 61 kg	(Japan) Yuki Kasahara	def.	(Japan) Motoki	TKO (Referee Stoppage)	1	2:24	Kickboxing
Catchweight 53 kg	(Japan) Syuto Sato	-	(Japan) Jin Mandokoro	No Contest (Ankle Injury)	3	1:30	Kickboxing
Catchweight 63 kg	(Japan) Ryuki Kaneda	def.	(Japan) Ayumu Yamamoto	TKO (Soccer kick)	1	2:07	
Catchweight 63 kg	(Japan) Sho Ogawa	def.	(Japan) Yuma Yamahata	TKO (3 Knockdowns)	1	2:52	Kickboxing
Lightweight 70 kg	(Japan) Masaya Jaki	def.	(Japan) Kouta	TKO (Referee Stoppage)	1	1:53	Kickboxing
Opening Fight
Catchweight 60 kg	(Japan) Shun	def.	(Japan) Ryo Sato	TKO (Referee Stoppage)	1	2:15	Kickboxing

== Rizin Trigger 3 ==
Rizin Trigger 3
- Promotion: Rizin Fighting Federation
- Date: April 16, 2022
- Venue: Musashino Forest Sport Plaza
- City: Chōfu, Japan
- Attendance: 6,515

Rizin Trigger 3 will be a Combat sport event held by Rizin Fighting Federation on April 16, 2022, at the Musashino Forest Sport Plaza in Chōfu, Japan.

=== Results ===
Rizin Trigger 3
Weight Class				Method	Round	T.Time	Notes
Lightweight 71 kg	(Brazil) Luiz Gustavo	def.	(Japan) Yusuke Yachi	TKO (Punches)	2	3:14	
Openweight	(Japan) Hideki Sekine	def.	(Japan) Takakenshin	TKO (Soccer Kicks and Punches)	2	3:49	
Featherweight 66 kg	(Japan) Masanori Kanehara	def.	(Japan) Kazumasa Majima	TKO (Punches)	3	3:37	
Flyweight 57 kg	(Japan) Takaki Soya	def.	(Japan) Nobuyoshi Nakatsukasa	KO (Soccer Kick and Punches)	2	3:29	
Bantamweight 61 kg	(Japan) Takuma Sudo	def.	(Japan) Shooto Watanabe	Decision (Split)	3	5:00	
Intermission
Lightweight 71 kg	(Japan) Kimihiro Eto	def.	(Japan) Tatsuya Saika	TKO (Punches)	3	4:12	
Catchweight 72 kg	(United States) Grant Bogdanove	def.	(Japan) Takeshi Izumi	TKO (Punches and Elbows)	3	3:16	
Catchweight 63.5 kg	(Japan) Shoji Otani	def.	(Japan) Rikiya	TKO (Three knockdown rule)	1	2:52	Kickboxing

== Rizin 35 ==
Rizin 35
- Promotion: Rizin Fighting Federation
- Date: April 17, 2022
- Venue: Musashino Forest Sport Plaza
- City: Chōfu, Japan
- Attendance: 8,935

Rizin 35 was a Combat sport event held by Rizin Fighting Federation on April 17, 2022, at the Musashino Forest Sport Plaza in Chōfu, Japan.

=== Background ===
A Rizin Super Atomweight Championship bout between the reigning champion Ayaka Hamasaki and Seika Izawa was scheduled for the event.

A Rizin Featherweight Championship rematch between the reigning champion Juntaro Ushiku and the former champion Yutaka Saito was scheduled for the event.

A Rizin Lightweight Championship rematch between the reigning champion Roberto de Souza and Johnny Case was scheduled for the event.

=== Results ===
Rizin 35
Weight Class				Method	Round	T.Time	Notes
Lightweight 71 kg	(Brazil) Roberto de Souza (c)	def.	(United States) Johnny Case	Submission (Reverse Triangle Armbar)	1	3:32	For the Rizin Lightweight Championship
Featherweight 66 kg	(Japan) Juntaro Ushiku (c)	def.	(Japan) Yutaka Saito	Decision (Unanimous)	3	5:00	For the Rizin Featherweight Championship
W.Super Atomweight 49 kg	(Japan) Seika Izawa	def.	(Japan) Ayaka Hamasaki (c)	Decision (Unanimous)	3	5:00	For the Rizin Super Atomweight Championship
Heavyweight 120 kg	(Japan) Tsuyoshi Kosaka	def.	(Japan) Mikio Ueda	KO (Punches)	1	2:05	
Intermission
W.Super Atomweight 49 kg	(Japan) Kanna Asakura	def.	(Japan) Satomi Takano	Decision (Unanimous)	3	5:00	
Lightweight 71 kg	(United States) Spike Carlyle	def.	(Japan) Koji Takeda	Technical Submission (Guillotine Choke)	2	1:35	
Heavyweight 120 kg	(Japan) Shoma Shibisai	def.	(Latvia) Rihards Bigis	TKO (Punches and Elbows)	1	1:36	
Bantamweight 61 kg	(Japan) Yuki Motoya	def.	(Brazil) Alan Yamaniha	Decision (Unanimous)	3	5:00	
Featherweight 66 kg	(Azerbaijan) Vugar Karamov	def.	(Japan) Taichi Nakajima	Technical Submission (Triangle Choke)	1	2:00	
Featherweight 66 kg	(Guam) Kyle Aguon	def.	(Japan) Takahiro Ashida	Decision (Unanimous)	3	5:00	

== Rizin Landmark 3 ==
Rizin Landmark 3
- Promotion: Rizin Fighting Federation
- Date: May 5, 2022
- Venue: TBA
- City: Japan

Rizin Landmark 3 was a Combat sport event held by Rizin Fighting Federation on May 5, 2022, in Japan.

=== Fight Card ===
Rizin Landmark 3
Weight Class				Method	Round	T.Time	Notes
Catchweight 68 kg	(Japan) Kleber Koike Erbst	def.	(Japan) Kyohei Hagiwara	Submission (Face Crank)	1	1:37	
Bantamweight 61 kg	(Japan) Kazuma Kuramoto	def.	(Japan) Mamoru Uoi	Decision (Unanimous)	3	5:00	
Catchweight	(Japan) Hideo Tokoro (Japan) Masanori Kanehara	-	(Japan) Daisuke Nakamura (Japan) Shinobu Ota	Draw (Time Limit)	1	10:00	Grappling Tag Match
Featherweight 66 kg	(Japan) Tetsuya Seki	def.	(Japan) Akira Haraguchi	Decision (Unanimous)	3	5:00	
Catchweight 62 kg	(Japan) Yushi	def.	(Japan) Tony Zenki	KO (Punch)	2	2:21	

== The Match 2022 ==
The Match 2022
- Promotion: Rizin Fighting Federation; K-1; RISE
- Date: June 19, 2022
- Venue: Tokyo Dome
- City: Tokyo, Japan
- Attendance: 56,399

THE MATCH 2022 was a Kickboxing event held by Rizin Fighting Federation in partnership with K-1 and RISE on June 19, 2022, in Tokyo, Japan.

=== Background ===
The main event will feature the megafight between the RISE Featherweight champion Tenshin Nasukawa and the K-1 Super Featherweight champion Takeru Segawa.

=== Results ===
The Match 2022
Weight Class				Method	Round	T.Time	Notes
Catchweight 58 kg	(Japan) Tenshin Nasukawa	def.	(Japan) Takeru Segawa	Decision (Unanimous)	3	3:00	Kickboxing
Catchweight 68.5 kg	(Japan) Kaito Ono	def.	(Japan) Masaaki Noiri	Ext R. Decision (Unanimous)	4	3:00	Kickboxing
Super lightweight 65 kg	(Japan) Kento Haraguchi	def.	(Japan) Hideaki Yamazaki	KO	2	0:33	Kickboxing
Super lightweight 65 kg	(Japan) Rukiya Anpo	def.	(Japan) Kosei Yamada	Decision (Unanimous)	3	3:00	Kickboxing
Lightweight 63 kg	(Thailand) Kongnapa Weerasakreck	def.	(Japan) Taiju Shiratori	KO	1	2:47	Kickboxing
Catchweight 62 kg	(Japan) Kan Nakamura	def.	(Japan) Leona Pettas	Decision (Majority)	3	3:00	Kickboxing
Catchweight 62 kg	(Japan) YA-MAN	def.	(Japan) Ryusei Ashizawa	TKO	1	1:49	Kickboxing
Catchweight 71 kg	(Japan) Hiromi Wajima	def.	(United States) BeyNoah	Decision (Unanimous)	3	3:00	Kickboxing
Catchweight 100 kg	(Iran) Sina Karimian	def.	(Japan) Rikiya Yamashita	Decision (Unanimous)	3	3:00	Kickboxing
Catchweight 100 kg	(Iran) Mahmoud Sattari	def.	(Japan) Yuta Uchida	TKO	1	1:18	Kickboxing
Super Featherweight 60 kg	(Japan) Yuki Kasahara	def.	(Japan) Chihiro Nakajima	Decision (Unanimous)	3	3:00	Kickboxing
Bantamweight 53 kg	(Japan) Kazane Nagai	def.	(Japan) Toma Kuroda	Decision (Unanimous)	3	3:00	Kickboxing
Super Bantamweight 55 kg	(Japan) Mutsuki Ebata	def.	(Japan) Riamu	Decision (Split)	3	3:00	Kickboxing
Super Bantamweight 55 kg	(Japan) Masashi Kumura	def.	(Japan) Shiro	Decision (Unanimous)	3	3:00	Kickboxing
Super Bantamweight 55 kg	(Japan) Masahiko Suzuki	def.	(Japan) Akihiro Kaneko	Decision (Majority)	3	3:00	Kickboxing
Bantamweight 53 kg	(Japan) Rui Okubo	def.	(Japan) Ryujin Nasukawa	Decision (Unanimous)	3	3:00	Kickboxing

== Rizin 36 – Okinawa ==
Rizin 36 - Okinawa
- Promotion: Rizin Fighting Federation
- Date: July 2, 2022
- Venue: Okinawa Arena
- City: Okinawa, Japan
- Attendance: 7,264

Rizin 36 was a Combat sport event held by Rizin Fighting Federation on July 2, 2022, in Okinawa, Japan.

=== Background ===
A bantamweight bout between the former Rizin bantamweight champion Kai Asakura and the unbeaten Ji Yong Yang was scheduled as the event headliner. Asakura withdrew from the fight on June 30, as he had re-injured his right hand. Suzuki vs. Hiramoto was made the new main event.

A featherweight bout between two former kickboxers, Hiroaki Suzuki and Ren Hiramoto, was booked as the co-main event.

=== Fight Card ===
Rizin 36
Weight Class				Method	Round	T.Time	Notes
Featherweight 66 kg	(Japan) Ren Hiramoto	def.	(Japan) Hiroaki Suzuki	Decision (Split)	3	5:00	
W. Super Atomweight 49 kg	(Japan) Saori Oshima	def.	(Japan) Miyuu Yamamoto	Decision (Split)	3	5:00	
Catchweight 54 kg	(Japan) Nobuyoshi Nakatsuka	def.	(Japan) Mitsuhisa Sunabe	TKO (Knee and Punches)	1	1:40	
Featherweight 66 kg	(Japan) Sora Yamamoto	def.	(Guam) Kyle Aguon	Decision (Unanimous)	3	5:00	
Bantamweight 61 kg	(South Korea) Ji Yong Yang	def.	(Japan) Shoji Maruyama	Technical Submission (Rear-Naked Choke)	3	1:46	
Intermission
Lightweight 71 kg	(Japan) Atsushi Kishimoto	def.	(Japan) Kohei Tokeshi	TKO (Punches)	1	2:05	
Bantamweight 61 kg	(Japan) Taiga Kawabe	def.	(Japan) Soichiro Arata	Decision (Unanimous)	3	3:00	Kickboxing
Flyweight 57 kg	(Japan) Yamato Fujita	def.	(Japan) Tatsuya So	Decision (Unanimous)	3	5:00	
Flyweight 57 kg	(Japan) Yutaro Muramoto	def.	(Japan) Shinichi Kojima	TKO (Punches)	2	2:23	
Flyweight 57 kg	(Japan) Yuki Ito	def.	(Japan) Yuichi Miyagi	TKO (Knees and Punches)	2	4:57	
W. Super Atomweight 49 kg	(Japan) Moeri Suda	def.	(Japan) Mizuki Oshiro	Submission (Armbar)	1	2:12	
Catchweight 72.5 kg	(Japan) Hirokatsu Miyagi	def.	(Japan) Tomoki Yoshino	Decision (Unanimous)	3	3:00	Kickboxing
Lightweight 71 kg	(United States) Tanner Lourenco	def.	(Japan) Orihey	TKO (Elbows)	2	1:05	

== Rizin 37 - Saitama ==
Rizin 37
- Promotion: Rizin Fighting Federation
- Date: July 31, 2022
- Venue: Saitama Super Arena
- City: Saitama, Japan
- Attendance: 11,166

Rizin 37 - Saitama will be a Combat sport event held by Rizin Fighting Federation on July 2, 2022, in Okinawa, Japan.

=== Background ===
The quarerfinal bouts of the 2022 Rizin Super Atomweight Grand Prix were held at the event.

A flyweight bout between Makoto Takahashi and the 44-year old veteran Hideo Tokoro and booked for the event.

The 2016 Olympic Games wrestling silver medalist Shinobu Ota was scheduled to face Yuki Motoya in his fourth professional bout.

Yoshiki Nakahara was initially scheduled to face Ulka Sasaki at the event, but Sasaki tested positive for COVID-19 and was replaced by Tetsuya Seki.

=== Fight Card ===
Rizin 37 - Saitama
Weight Class				Method	Round	T.Time	Notes
Super Atomweight 49 kg	(Japan) Seika Izawa	def.	(Brazil) Laura Fontoura	Submission (Guillotine Choke)	1	3:47	Rizin Super Atomweight Grand Prix Quarterfinals
Super Atomweight 49 kg	(Japan) Ayaka Hamasaki	def.	(Mexico) Jessica Aguilar	Decision (Unanimous)	3	5:00	Rizin Super Atomweight Grand Prix Quarterfinals
Flyweight 57 kg	(Japan) Makoto Takahashi	def.	(Japan) Hideo Tokoro	Decision (Unanimous)	3	5:00	
Catchweight 72 kg	(Japan) Koji Takeda	def.	(United States) Johnny Case	Decision (Unanimous)	3	5:00	
Super Atomweight 49 kg	(South Korea) Si Woo Park	def.	(Japan) Kanna Asakura	Decision (Unanimous)	3	5:00	Rizin Super Atomweight Grand Prix Quarterfinals
Super Atomweight 49 kg	(Japan) Rena Kubota	def.	(Ukraine) Anastasiya Svetkivska	Decision (Unanimous)	3	5:00	Rizin Super Atomweight Grand Prix Quarterfinals
Intermission
Heavyweight 120 kg	(Japan) Tsuyoshi Sudario	def.	(Japan) Hideki Sekine	KO (Punch)	1	0:53	
Bantamweight 61 kg	(Japan) Yuki Motoya	def.	(Japan) Shinobu Ota	Decision (Unanimous)	3	5:00	
Catchweight 68 kg	(Japan) Yoshiki Nakahara	def.	(Japan) Tetsuya Seki	Decision (Unanimous)	3	5:00	
Catchweight 80 kg	(Japan) Daichi Abe	def.	(Brazil) Marcos Yoshio Souza	KO (Punch and Soccer Kick)	2	3:02	
Featherweight 66 kg	(Azerbaijan) Vugar Karamov	def.	(Japan) Sora Yamamoto	Decision (Unanimous)	3	5:00	
Flyweight 58 kg	(Japan) Ryusei	def.	(Japan) Kaishi	TKO (Knee)	3	1:23	Kickboxing rules
Flyweight 58 kg	(Japan) Hiroki Kasahara	def.	(Japan) Yusaku Ishizuki	Decision (Unanimous)	3	3:00	Kickboxing rules
Catchweight 62 kg	(Japan) Yushi	def.	(Japan) Haruki	Submission (Rear-Naked Choke)	2	0:43	

== Super Rizin & Rizin 38 ==
Super Rizin & Rizin 38
- Promotion: Rizin Fighting Federation; The Money Team
- Date: September 25, 2022
- Venue: Saitama Super Arena
- City: Saitama, Japan

Super Rizin & Rizin 38 was a combat sport event held by Rizin Fighting Federation in partnership with The Money Team on September 25, 2022, at the Saitama Super Arena in Japan. The event was split into two parts: Super Rizin, which catered to foreign audiences, and Rizin 38, which began five hours later. Both cards were broadcast by Rizin Stream Pass and Abema in Japan.

Outside of Japan, Integrated Sports produced English-language PPVs of both cards for FITE. They were the first RIZIN events to be distributed on FITE since Rizin 23 & Rizin 22 in 2020.

=== Background ===
The event was headlined by an exhibition boxing match between Floyd Mayweather Jr. and Japanese mixed martial artist and YouTuber Mikuru Asakura.

The 2021 Rizin Bantamweight Grand Prix winner Hiromasa Ougikubo faced current Road FC Featherweight champion (also former ONE Bantamweight World Champion) Soo Chul Kim in a bantamweight non-title bout.

The Rizin Super Atomweight Grand Prix Semifinals bouts took place during the event, which saw Si Woo Park face Ayaka Hamasaki and Seika Izawa face Anastasiya Svetkivska. Izawa was originally expected to face Rena Kubota, who was forced to withdraw due to injury.

=== Results ===
Super Rizin
Weight Class				Method	Round	T.Time	Notes
Catchweight	(United States) Floyd Mayweather Jr.	def.	(Japan) Mikuru Asakura	TKO (Punch)	2	2:59	Exhibition boxing
Openweight	(Japan) Kōji Tanaka	def.	(United States) Jizzy Mack	TKO (Referee stoppage)	3	0:50	Exhibition boxing
Catchweight 53 kg	(Japan) Nadaka Yoshinari	def.	(Thailand) Bandasak So Trakunpet	TKO (Referee stoppage)	1	2:24	Muay Thai rules
Featherweight 66 kg	(Japan) Kota Miura	def.	(Thailand) Bunchuai Phonsungnoen	Submission (Armbar)	1	1:54	
Rizin 38
Bantamweight 61 kg	(Japan) Kyoji Horiguchi	def.	(Japan) Yuto Hokamura	Technical Submission (Arm-Triangle Choke)	2	2:59	
Super Atomweight 49 kg	(Japan) Seika Izawa	def.	(Ukraine) Anastasiya Svetkivska	Submission (Armbar)	2	4:56	Rizin Super Atomweight Grand Prix Semifinals
Super Atomweight 49 kg	(South Korea) Si Woo Park	def.	(Japan) Ayaka Hamasaki	Decision (Unanimous)	3	5:00	Rizin Super Atomweight Grand Prix Semifinals
Bantamweight 61 kg	(South Korea) Soo Chul Kim	def.	(Japan) Hiromasa Ougikubo	Decision (Unanimous)	3	5:00	
Heavyweight 120 kg	(Japan) Shoma Shibisai	def.	(Brazil) Cally Gibrainn de Oliveira	Submission (Rear-Naked Choke)	1	1:48	
Featherweight 66 kg	(Japan) Chihiro Suzuki	def.	(Japan) Kyohei Hagiwara	Submission (Rear-naked choke)	2	2:14	
Lightweight 71 kg	(Brazil) Luiz Gustavo	def.	(Japan) Juri Ohara	KO (Punches)	1	1:23	

== Rizin 39 ==
Rizin 39
- Promotion: Rizin Fighting Federation
- Date: October 23, 2022
- Venue: Marine Messe Fukuoka
- City: Fukuoka, Japan

Rizin 39 was a Combat sport event held by Rizin Fighting Federation on October 23, 2022, at the Marine Messe Fukuoka in Japan.

=== Background ===
A Rizin Featherweight Championship bout between current champion Juntarou Ushiku and former KSW Featherweight Champion Kleber Koike Erbst was scheduled as the main event.

A bantamweight kickboxing bout between Trent Girdham and the former Rajadamnern Stadium bantamweight champion Genji Umeno was announced for the event.

=== Results ===
Rizin 39
Weight Class				Method	Round	T.Time	Notes
Featherweight 66 kg	(Japan) Kleber Koike Erbst	def.	(Japan) Juntaro Ushiku (c)	Submission (Triangle Choke)	2	1:29	For the Rizin Featherweight Championship
Heavyweight 120 kg	(Japan) Tsuyoshi Sudario	def.	(Romania) Janos Csukas	TKO (Punches and Knee)	2	0:30	
Lightweight 71 kg	(Japan) Yusuke Yachi	def.	(South Africa) Boyd Allen	Decision (Unanimous)	3	5:00	
Lightweight 71 kg	(Japan) Koji Takeda	def.	(United States) Zach Zane	Submission (Armbar)	1	3:35	
Intermission
Catchweight 75 kg	(Japan) Sho Patrick Usami	def.	(Japan) Shinji Sasaki	TKO (Punches)	3	2:33	
Welterweight 77 kg	(Japan) Daichi Abe	def.	(Japan) Yukinari Tamura	Decision (Unanimous)	3	5:00	
Bantamweight 61 kg	(Japan) Genji Umeno	def.	(Australia) Trent Girdham	TKO (Knee Injury)	1	0:21	Kickboxing rules
Featherweight 66 kg	(Japan) Takahiro Ashida	def.	(Japan) Hirotaka Nakada	Decision (Unanimous)	3	5:00	
Featherweight 66 kg	(Japan) Yoshiki Nakahara	def.	(Japan) Akira Haraguchi	TKO (Punches and Soccer Kicks)	1	2:31	
Bantamweight 61 kg	(Japan) Motonobu Tezuka	def.	(Azerbaijan) Mehman Mamedov	TKO (Corner Stoppage)	1	4:33	
Catchweight 57.5 kg	(Japan) Shogo Kuriaki	def.	(Japan) Kakeru	TKO (Head Kick)	2	1:42	Kickboxing rules
Catchweight 63 kg	(Japan) REITO BRAVELY	def.	(Japan) Koichiro Seki	KO (Head Kick)	1	0:34	Kickboxing rules

== Rizin Landmark Vol.4 ==
Rizin Landmark Vol.4
- Promotion: Rizin Fighting Federation
- Date: November 6, 2022
- Venue: Dolphins Arena
- City: Nagoya, Japan

Rizin Landmark Vol.4 was a Combat sport event held by Rizin Fighting Federation on November 6, 2022, at the Dolphins Arena in Japan.

=== Background ===
A bantamweight bout between Satoshi Yamasu and Ren Hiramoto was booked as the main event.

=== Fight Card ===
Rizin Landmark Vol.4
Weight Class				Method	Round	T.Time	Notes
Lightweight 70 kg	(Japan) Ren Hiramoto	def.	(Japan) Satoshi Yamasu	Decision (Unanimous)	3	5:00	
Featherweight 66 kg	(Japan) Chihiro Suzuki	def.	(Japan) Masakazu Imanari	Decision (Unanimous)	3	5:00	
Bantamweight 61 kg	(Japan) Yuki Motoya	def.	(Japan) Kazuma Kuramoto	Decision (Unanimous)	3	5:00	
Heavyweight 120 kg	(Japan) Kiyoshi Kuwabara	def.	(Japan) Ikuhisa Minowa	TKO (Punches)	1	2:24	
Intermission
Heavyweight 120 kg	(Brazil) Cally Gibrainn de Oliveira	def.	(Japan) Takakenshin	TKO (Punches)	1	4:35	
Super Atomweight 49 kg	(Japan) Satomi Takano	def.	(Brazil) Laura Fontoura	Decision (Unanimous)	3	5:00	
Flyweight 57 kg	(Japan) Yusaku Nakamura	def.	(Japan) Takaki Soya	Decision (Split)	3	5:00	
Featherweight 66 kg	(Japan) Jin Aoi	def.	(Japan) Hiroaki Suzuki	Decision (Unanimous)	3	5:00	
Bantamweight 61 kg	(Brazil) Alan Yoshihiro Yamaniha	def.	(Japan) Yasuhiro Kawamura	Decision (Unanimous)	3	5:00	
Bantamweight 61 kg	(South Korea) Ji Yong Yang	def.	(Japan) Mamoru Uoi	KO (Punch)	2	4:13	
Featherweight 66 kg	(Japan) Yuta Kubo	def.	(Japan) Keisuke Okuda	TKO (Elbows and Punches)	1	4:43	
Opening Bouts
Bantamweight 61 kg	(Japan) Riku Yoshida	def.	(Japan) Junya Hibino	TKO (Punches)	2	3:00	
Flyweight 57 kg	(Japan) Kenta Kubo	def.	(Japan) Hideyoshi Okamoto	KO (Punches and Soccer Kick)	2	2:52	
Strawweight 53 kg	(Japan) Syuto Sato	def.	(Japan) KAZUNORI	TKO (Referee Stoppage)	1	0:39	Kickboxing rules

== Rizin 40 & Rizin vs Bellator ==
Rizin 40 & Rizin vs Bellator
- Promotion: Rizin Fighting Federation; Bellator MMA
- Date: December 31, 2022
- Venue: Saitama Super Arena
- City: Saitama, Japan
- Attendance: 23,661

Rizin 40 & Rizin vs Bellator was a Combat sport event co-promoted with Bellator MMA that took place on December 31, 2022, at the Saitama Super Arena in Saitama, Japan. As with Super Rizin & Rizin 38, the event was split between two cards; the Bellator card would follow the Rizin 40 card after an intermission.

In the United States, Rizin 40 would air live on FITE, while the Bellator card aired via tape delay on Showtime. Outside of Japan, both cards aired live on FITE.

=== Fight Card ===
Bellator MMA vs. Rizin
Weight Class				Method	Round	T.Time	Notes
Featherweight 66 kg	(Japan) Kleber Koike Erbst	vs.	(Brazil) Patrício Pitbull				
Lightweight 70 kg	(Brazil) Roberto de Souza	vs.	(United States) A. J. McKee				
Bantamweight 61 kg	(South Korea) Soo Chul Kim	vs.	(United States) Juan Archuleta				
Flyweight 57 kg	(Japan) Hiromasa Ougikubo	vs.	(Japan) Kyoji Horiguchi				
Lightweight 70 kg	(Japan) Koji Takeda	vs.	(Russia) Gadzhi Rabadanov				
Rizin 40
Super Atomweight 49 kg	(Japan) Seika Izawa	vs.	(South Korea) Si Woo Park				Rizin Super Atomweight Grand Prix Finals
Heavyweight 120 kg	(Japan) Tsuyoshi Sudario	vs.	(New Zealand) Junior Tafa				
Bantamweight 61 kg	(Japan) Naoki Inoue	vs.	(Japan) Kenta Takizawa				
Bantamweight 61 kg	(Japan) Yuki Motoya	vs.	(Brazil) Rogério Bontorin				
Lightweight 71 kg	(United States) Johnny Case	vs.	(Brazil) Luiz Gustavo				
Flyweight 57 kg	(Japan) Hideo Tokoro	vs.	(United States) John Dodson				
Lightweight 71 kg	(Japan) Sho Patrick Usami	vs.	(United States) BeyNoah				

== See also ==
- List of current Rizin FF fighters
- 2022 in UFC
- 2022 in Bellator MMA
- 2022 in ONE Championship
- 2022 in Absolute Championship Akhmat
- 2022 in Konfrontacja Sztuk Walki
- 2022 in AMC Fight Nights
- 2022 in Brave Combat Federation
- 2022 in Road FC
- 2022 Professional Fighters League season
- 2022 in Eagle Fighting Championship
- 2022 in Legacy Fighting Alliance
