= Kanna Asakura =

Japanese mixed martial artist

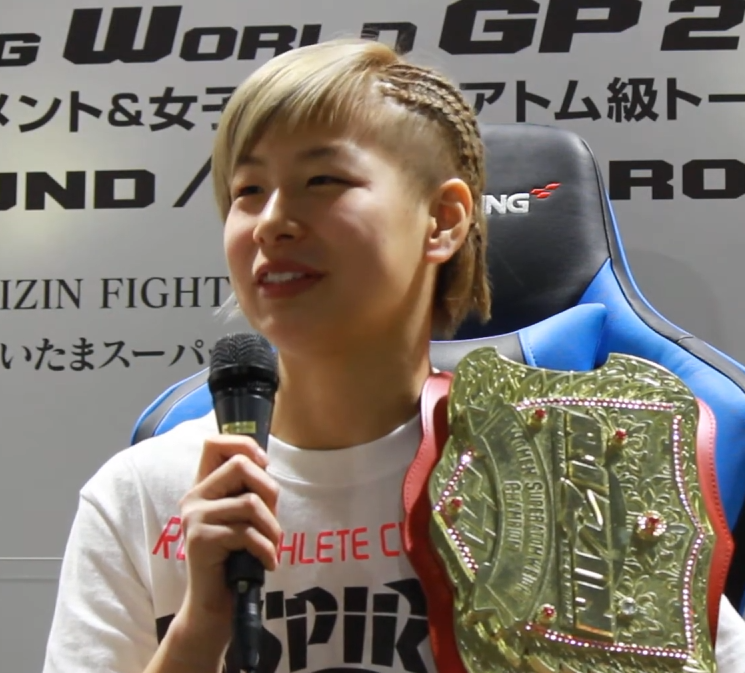
- Asakura in January 2018
- Born: 浅倉栞南; October 12, 1997 (age 29); Kashiwa, Chiba, Japan
- Nationality: Japanese
- Height: 5 ft 2 in (1.57 m)
- Weight: 108 lb (49 kg; 7.7 st)
- Division: Atomweight
- Style: Wrestling, BJJ
- Fighting out of: Chiba, Japan
- Team: Paraestra
- Years active: 2014–2024

Mixed martial arts record
- Total: 28
- Wins: 20
- By knockout: 1
- By submission: 6
- By decision: 13
- Losses: 8
- By knockout: 0
- By submission: 1
- By decision: 7
- Draws: 0
- No contests: 0

Other information
- Mixed martial arts record from Sherdog

Kanna Asakura

YouTube information
- Channel: Asakura Kanna Channel / 浅倉カンナ
- Years active: 2019–present
- Genre: vlog
- Subscribers: 96.8 thousand
- Views: 18.4 million
- Last updated: 4 August 2026

Kanna Asakura (Japanese: 浅倉栞南; born October 12, 1997, in Kashiwa, Chiba, Japan) is a female Japanese retired mixed martial artist. She competed in the Atomweight (106 lb) division and completed with the Rizin Fighting Federation. She is the #6 ranked Atomweight in the world according to Sherdog and #6 Atomweight according to Fight Matrix.

== Background ==
Due to her father's influence, she started wrestling from the age of 5 and belonged to "Tokyo Gold Kids" from the upper grades of elementary school. Asakura won first at the 2011 Klippan Ladies International Wrestling Tournament in the cadet division for 38 kg and in the first year of high school, she achieved a brilliant record of 3rd place in the 46 kg class of the National High School Championships.

She quit wrestling at 16, she re-entered high school, and while thinking about what to do with her future, saw footage of shoot boxing and shoot wrestling bouts. Seeing an avenue to make use of her wrestling and the Jiu Jitsu she was learning, she started mixed martial arts.

== Mixed martial arts career ==
Asakura made her professional mixed martial arts debut on October 4, 2014, at the age of 17 when she faced Naomi Okaki at Vale Tudo Japan 6 and won by unanimous decision. Following this, Asakura compiled a professional record of 9–2, with wins over Yasuko Tamada and Saori Ishioka, before signing with the Rizin Fighting Federation to join their Super Bantamweight World Grand Prix Tournament in December 2017.

=== Rizin FF ===
==== Super Atomweight Grand Prix ====
Victorious in the quarterfinals and semifinals, Asakura advanced to the finals, then competing in front of 18,316 fans in what was arguably the biggest women’s title fight in Japanese MMA history, choked out Shoot Boxing superstar Rena Kubota to become the Super Atomweight Grand Prix winner.

On May 6, 2018, Kanna Asakura faced Melissa Sophia Karagianis at Rizin 10. She won the fight via three round unanimous decision extending her win streak to 7. After the fight Rena Kubota entered the ring and challenged her to a rematch. Soon after the fight was made official, and scheduled to take place on July 29, 2018, at Rizin 11 in Saitama, Japan. Despite several improvements from Rena, Asakura used her relentless pressure to win the bout by unanimous decision.

==== First title shot ====
Asakura faced Ayaka Hamasaki on December 21, 2018, at Rizin 14 for the inaugural Rizin Super Atomweight Championship. She lost the bout in the second rout via armbar.

On March 9, 2019, she faced against DEEP JEWELS Atomweight champion Tomo Maesawa in a non-title bout at Deep Jewels 23 and won via a unanimous decision.

On June 2, 2019, Asakura faced Miyuu Yamamoto at Rizin 16. She lost the bout via unanimous decision.

On August 18, 2019, Kanna faced future Invicta FC Atomweight Champion Alesha Zappitella at RIZIN 18 and won a split unanimous decision.

On December 29, 2019, Kanna faced Jamie Hinshaw at Bellator 237/Bellator Japan and won via a third round armbar.

On August 9, 2020, she faced Mizuki Furuse at Rizin 22 and won via TKO by pounding.

On December 31, 2020, Kanna faced Ai Shimizu at Rizin 26, winning the bout via unanimous decision.

==== Second title shot ====
Asakura faced Ayaka Hamasaki in a rematch for the Rizin Super Atomweight Championship at Rizin 27 on March 21, 2021. She lost a close bout via split decision.

Asakura faced the reigning Jewels atomweight and DEEP Microweight champion Saori Oshima at Rizin 31 - Yokohama on October 24, 2021. She lost the bout via split decision.

Asakura faced the Shooto Super Atomweight champion Satomi Takano on April 17, 2022, at Rizin 35. She won the fight by unanimous decision.

==== Super Atomweight Grand Prix 2022 ====
Asakura faced Si Woo Park in the quarterfinal bout of the Rizin Super Atomweight Grand Prix at Rizin 37 - Saitama on July 31, 2022. She lost the fight by unanimous decision.

Asakura faced the Mei Yamaguchi at Rizin Landmark 5 on April 29, 2023, winning the fight by unanimous decision.

Asakura faced Rizin Super Atomweight Champion Seika Izawa in a non-title bout at Rizin 48 on September 29, 2024. She lost the fight by unanimous decision. Asakura left her gloves in the ring following the bout signaling her retirement from mixed martial arts competition.

== Personal life ==
After her bout at Rizin 11, Asakura was seen hugging kickboxing superstar Tenshin Nasukawa, fuelling further speculation that they may be in a relationship. They later confirmed that they were dating. They broke up at the end of 2019 after photos of Tenshin being physical with Rizin ring girl, Hakase Mai, leaked online.

She also has a Youtube channel with 100K subscribers and 15 million views.

== Championships and accomplishments ==
- Rizin Fighting Federation
  - Rizin Women's Super Atomweight Grand Prix Winner
  - Tied (with Yuki Motoya) for most bouts in Rizin FF promotional history (17)
- MMA Sucka
  - 2017 Best Non-UFC Breakout Star

== Mixed martial arts record ==
Professional record breakdown
28 matches	20 wins	8 losses
By knockout	1	0
By submission	6	1
By decision	13	7

Res.	Record	Opponent	Method	Event	Date	Round	Time	Location	Notes
Loss	20–8	Seika Izawa	Decision (unanimous)	Rizin 48	September 29, 2024	3	5:00	Saitama, Japan	Non-title bout.
Win	20–7	Mei Yamaguchi	Decision (unanimous)	Rizin Landmark 5	April 29, 2023	3	5:00	Tokyo, Japan	
Loss	19–7	Si Woo Park	Decision (unanimous)	Rizin 37	July 31, 2022	3	5:00	Saitama, Japan	2022 Rizin Super Atomweight Grand Prix. Quarterfinal.
Win	19–6	Satomi Takano	Decision (unanimous)	Rizin 35	April 17, 2022	3	5:00	Chōfu, Japan	
Loss	18–6	Saori Oshima	Decision (split)	Rizin 31	October 24, 2021	3	5:00	Yokohama, Japan	
Loss	18–5	Ayaka Hamasaki	Decision (split)	Rizin 27	March 21, 2021	3	5:00	Nagoya, Japan	For the Rizin Super Atomweight Championship.
Win	18–4	Ai Shimizu	Decision (unanimous)	Rizin 26	December 31, 2020	3	5:00	Saitama, Japan	
Win	17–4	Mizuki Furuse	TKO (punches)	Rizin 22	August 9, 2020	1	1:35	Yokohama, Japan	
Win	16–4	Jayme Hinshaw	Submission (kimura)	Bellator 237	December 29, 2019	3	3:33	Saitama, Japan	
Win	15–4	Alesha Zappitella	Decision (split)	Rizin 18	August 18, 2019	3	5:00	Nagoya, Japan	
Loss	14–4	Miyuu Yamamoto	Decision (unanimous)	Rizin 16	June 2, 2019	3	5:00	Kobe, Japan	
Win	14–3	Tomo Maesawa	Decision (unanimous)	Deep Jewels 23	March 8, 2019	3	5:00	Tokyo, Japan	
Loss	13–3	Ayaka Hamasaki	Submission (armbar)	Rizin 14	December 31, 2018	2	4:34	Saitama, Japan	For the inaugural Rizin Super Atomweight Championship.
Win	13–2	Rena Kubota	Decision (unanimous)	Rizin 11	July 29, 2018	3	5:00	Saitama, Japan	
Win	12–2	Melissa Sophia Karagianis	Decision (unanimous)	Rizin 10	May 6, 2018	3	5:00	Fukuoka, Japan	
Win	11–2	Rena Kubota	Technical Submission (rear-naked choke)	Rizin World Grand Prix 2017: Final Round	December 31, 2017	1	4:34	Saitama, Japan	Won the 2017 Rizin Super Atomweight Grand Prix.
Win	10–2	Maria de Oliveira Neta	Submission (armbar)	Rizin World Grand Prix 2017: Final Round	December 31, 2017	2	3:40	Saitama, Japan	2017 Rizin Super Atomweight Grand Prix Semifinal.
Win	9–2	Sylwia Juśkiewicz	Decision (unanimous)	Rizin World Grand Prix 2017: Opening Round - Part 2	October 15, 2017	3	5:00	Fukuoka, Japan	Super Atomweight (108 lb) debut. 2017 Rizin Super Atomweight Grand Prix Quarterfinal.
Win	8–2	Saori Ishioka	Decision (unanimous)	Deep Jewels 17	August 26, 2017	3	5:00	Tokyo, Japan	2017 Rizin Super Atomweight Grand Prix Qualification.
Win	7–2	Aleksandra Toncheva Plamenova	Decision (unanimous)	Rizin 2017 in Yokohama: Sakura	April 16, 2017	2	5:00	Yokohama, Japan	
Win	6–2	Natsuki Shimomakise	Submission (rear-naked choke)	Deep Jewels 15	February 25, 2017	1	2:29	Tokyo, Japan	
Loss	5–2	Alyssa Garcia	Decision (unanimous)	Rizin World Grand Prix 2016: 2nd Round	December 29, 2016	3	5:00	Saitama, Japan	
Win	5–1	Yoon Ha Hong	Decision (unanimous)	Deep Jewels 13	August 27, 2016	2	5:00	Tokyo, Japan	
Win	4–1	Mikiko Hiyama	Submission (rear naked choke)	Shooto: Professional Shooto 7/17	July 17, 2016	1	3:43	Tokyo, Japan	
Loss	3–1	Syuri Kondo	Decision (unanimous)	Pancrase 277	April 24, 2016	3	3:00	Tokyo, Japan	Strawweight bout.
Win	3–0	Yasuko Tamada	Decision (unanimous)	Vale Tudo Japan: VTJ 7th	September 13, 2015	3	3:00	Tokyo, Japan	
Win	2–0	Miyuki Furusawa	Submission (rear naked choke)	Vale Tudo Japan: VTJ in Osaka	June 21, 2015	1	2:17	Tokyo, Japan	
Win	1–0	Naomi Okaki	Decision (unanimous)	Vale Tudo Japan: VTJ 6th	October 4, 2014	3	5:00	Ōta, Tokyo, Japan	Atomweight debut.

== Amateur mixed martial arts record ==
Res.	Record	Opponent	Method	Event	Date	Round	Time	Location	Notes
Win	1-0	Mikiko Hiyama	Submission (Rear naked choke)	Shooto / STF - Hardball	November 8, 2015	1	3:18	Nagano, Japan	.

== See also ==
- List of female mixed martial artists
