= Suwanan Boonsorn =

Thai mixed martial artist

- Born: June 14, 1996 (age 30); Bangkok, Thailand
- Other names: Amp The Rocket
- Nationality: Thai
- Height: 5 ft 0 in (1.52 m)
- Weight: 97 lb (44 kg; 6 st 13 lb)
- Division: Atomweight; Microweight
- Style: Brazilian jiu-jitsu
- Fighting out of: Bangkok, Thailand
- Team: Thanthorng Gym
- Years active: 2014–present

Mixed martial arts record
- Total: 11
- Wins: 5
- By knockout: 0
- By submission: 5
- By decision: 0
- Losses: 6
- By knockout: 0
- By submission: 4
- By decision: 2

Other information
- Mixed martial arts record from Sherdog

Suwanan Boonsorn (born June 14, 1996) is a Thai mixed martial artist, currently fighting in the microweight division of Jewels, where she is the inaugural microweight champion. A professional competitor since 2014, Suwanan has also competed in Rizin.

== Mixed martial arts career ==
=== Full Metal Dojo ===
In her professional mixed martial arts debut, Suwanan was scheduled to face Kaewjai Prachumwong at Full Metal Dojo 2: Protect Your Neck on August 23, 2014. She won the bout by a second-round submission.

Suwanan faced Tipsuta Anoushian at Full Metal Dojo 10: To Live and Die in Bangkok on March 19, 2016. She lost the fight by a first-round submission.

Suwanan faced Loma Lookboonmee for the vacant Full Metal Dojo Atomweight Championship at Full Metal Dojo 16: Big Trouble in Little Bangkok on November 3, 2018. She won the fight by a first-round submission to win the title.

=== Jewels and Rizin ===
In her Jewels debut, Suwanan faced Emi Sato on March 8, 2019, at Deep Jewels 23. She won the bout by rear-naked choke in the first round.

Suwanan faced Rizin Super Atomweight Champion Ayaka Watanabe in a non-title bout on August 18, 2019 at RIZIN 18. She lost the bout via armbar in the first round.

Suwanan faced Yoon Ha Hong at Deep Jewels 26 on October 22, 2019. She won the bout by first-round armbar.

Suwanan faced Miyuu Yamamoto at Rizin 20 on December 31, 2019. She lost the bout via unanimous decision.

Suwanan faced Emi Sato at Deep Jewels 28 on February 24, 2020. She won the bout by armbar in the first round.

==== Jewels Microweight Champion ====
A four woman tournament was scheduled prior to Deep Jewels 28 to crown the promotions first Microweight Champion with the challengers being Emi Sato, Mizuki Furuse, Suwanan Boonsorn and Yasuko Tamada with Moe Sasaki as reserve. Furuse and Suwanan advanced to the final which was scheduled to take place at Deep Jewels 29 before the COVID-19 pandemic, however this event and the match couldn't be rescheduled when the promotion returned with the show. On November 5, it was announced that Furuse would be taking an extended absence as she was both pregnant and getting married. As a result of these developments, Jewels declared Suwanan as the inaugural champion.

After a three year hiatus, Suwanan faced Seika Izawa in a women's super atomweight bout at Deep Jewels 41 on May 28, 2023. She lost the fight by triangle choke in the first round.

Suwanan was scheduled to defend the microweight title belt against Aya Murakami at Deep Jewels 42 on September 10, 2023. She lost the bout by unanimous decision.

== Muaythai and kickboxing career ==
Suwanan has competed in over 80 Muaythai bouts, and is a former World Muaythai Council women's mini-flyweight champion and a World Muaythai Professional Federation women's mini-flyweight champion.

Suwanan faced Panchan Rina in a kickboxing match at Knock Out 56 ~New Beginning~ on August 29, 2025. After being struck by an illegal blow in the first round, Suwanan lost the bout by KO in the third round when she failed to get up after being knocked down from a knee to the face.

== Championships and accomplishments ==
- Full Metal Dojo
  - Full Metal Dojo Atomweight Championship (One time)
- Jewels
  - Jewels Microweight Championship (One time)

== Mixed martial arts record ==
Professional record breakdown
11 matches	5 wins	6 losses
By submission	5	4
By decision	0	2

Res.	Record	Opponent	Method	Event	Date	Round	Time	Location	Notes
Loss	5–6	Machi Fukuda	Submission (inverted heel hook)	Deep Jewels 47	November 23, 2024	2	2:27	Tokyo, Japan	Strawweight debut.
Loss	5–5	Aya Murakami	Decision (unanimous)	Deep Jewels 42	September 10, 2023	3	5:00	Tokyo, Japan	Lost the Jewels Microweight Championship.
Loss	5–4	Seika Izawa	Submission (triangle choke)	Deep Jewels 41	May 28, 2023	1	3:31	Tokyo, Japan	Super Atomweight bout.
Win	5–3	Emi Sato	Submission (armbar)	Deep Jewels 28	February 24, 2020	1	0:49	Saitama, Japan	Microweight debut.
Loss	4–3	Miyuu Yamamoto	Decision (unanimous)	Rizin 20	December 31, 2019	3	5:00	Saitama, Japan	
Win	4–2	Hong Yoon-ha	Submission (armbar)	Deep Jewels 26	October 22, 2019	1	1:37	Tokyo, Japan	Atomweight bout.
Loss	3–2	Ayaka Hamasaki	Submission (armbar)	Rizin 18	August 18, 2019	1	3:29	Nagoya, Japan	Super Atomweight debut. Non-title bout.
Win	3–1	Emi Sato	Submission (rear-naked choke)	Deep Jewels 23	March 8, 2019	1	0:34	Tokyo, Japan	
Win	2–1	Loma Lookboonmee	Submission (armbar)	Full Metal Dojo 16	November 3, 2018	1	2:06	Bangkok, Thailand	Won the vacant FMD Atomweight Championship.
Loss	1-1	Tipsuta Anoushian	Submission (armbar)	Full Metal Dojo 10	March 19, 2016	1	0:59	Bangkok, Thailand	Atomweight debut.
Win	1–0	Kaewjai Prachumwong	Submission (armbar)	Full Metal Dojo 2	August 23, 2014	2	3:41	Phuket, Thailand	Catchweight (110 lb) bout.
