= Ray Sadeghi =

- Born: April 1, 1982 (age 44); Tehran, Iran
- Other name: Jizzy Mack
- Occupation: Bodyguard
- Years active: 2013-present

Ray Vinci Sadeghi (born April 1, 1982), known professionally as Jizzy Mack, is a professional bodyguard from Las Vegas.

He is best known for being the personal bodyguard to American professional boxing promoter and retired professional boxer Floyd Mayweather Jr.

== Career ==
At the age of 15, Ray Sadeghi and his family moved to New York City. Shortly after moving to America, he found himself on his own struggling to eat. In a recent interview with Respect, Sadeghi spoke of how these early life struggles as a teenager encouraged him to be a fighter and protect people. In 2009, before becoming a bodyguard, he went to medical school in Poland and became a dentist. In 2013, he became a professional bodyguard to Floyd Mayweather Jr.

In October 2017, he gained national attention by being outspoken about a possible Floyd Mayweather Jr. and Conor McGregor rematch. Early in 2018, Sadeghi and his fellow bodyguard Greg LaRosa, who call themselves the Brixx Brothers, developed a Cannabidiol oil to help cancer patients. In October 2018, in an exclusive video by TMZ, Sadeghi gained national attention by saying he would have fought the late Bruce Lee in order to protect Mayweather.

He fought an exhibition boxing bout in the co-main event of Super Rizin versus Kōji "Kouzi" Tanaka. He lost the fight by technical knockout in the 3rd round.

== Exhibition boxing record ==
1 fight	0 wins	1 loss
By knockout	0	1

No.	Result	Record	Opponent	Type	Round, time	Date	Age	Location	Notes
1	Loss	0–1	Kōji Tanaka	TKO	3 (3), 0:50	Sep 25, 2022	40 years, 177 days	Saitama Super Arena, Saitama, Japan	

== Filmography ==
Television

Year	Title	Role	Notes
2016	Bohemia: Gametime	Himself	Cameo appearance

== Discography ==
=== Albums ===
List of albums, with selected details
Title	Details
The Money Team	Released: August 5, 2017; Label: Ruby Recordings; Formats: Digital download
