= Saori Oshima =

Japanese mixed martial artist

- Born: November 14, 1994 (age 31); Hamada, Shimane Prefecture, Japan
- Native name: 大島沙緒里 安達 沙緒里 (née)
- Height: 4 ft 11 in (1.50 m)
- Weight: 108 lb (49 kg; 7 st 10 lb)
- Division: Atomweight
- Style: Judo
- Stance: Orthodox
- Fighting out of: Tokyo, Japan
- Team: AACC (2020—2024); Me, We (2024—present)
- Years active: 2020–present

Mixed martial arts record
- Total: 24
- Wins: 17
- By knockout: 2
- By submission: 10
- By decision: 5
- Losses: 7
- By knockout: 1
- By submission: 0
- By decision: 6

Other information
- Mixed martial arts record from Sherdog
- Judo career
- Rank: 2nd dan black belt
Medal record
Women's judo
Representing Japan
World Cadets Championships
Bronze medal – third place	2009 Budapest	‍–‍40 kg

Profile at external judo databases
- JudoInside.com: 58265

Saori Oshima (大島沙緒里, born 14 November 1994), née Saori Adachi, is a Japanese mixed martial artist. She currently competes in the atomweight division of Jewels. She is the current DEEP and Jewels Microweight champion.

As of January 3, 2021, Oshima is ranked as the fourth best atomweight in the world by Fight Matrix and third best by Sherdog.

== Background ==
Saori Oshima began training Judo when she was 3, and kept training it exclusively until she was 23. Oshima began training MMA at the age of 24. Oshima is married to Yuma Oshima, a multiple-time Judo Grand Slam medalist. She is mother to twin daughters.

== Mixed martial arts career ==
=== Shooto ===
Oshima made her professional debut against Yuki Ono at Shooto 2020 1/26 on January 26, 2020, at the age of 25. She was originally scheduled to fight Zephania Ngaya, before Ngaya withdrew from the bout for undisclosed reasons. Oshima won the fight by a second-round technical knockout, stopping Ono with punches from the crucifix midway through the round.

In her second appearance with Shooto, Oshima faced the vastly more experienced Mina Kurobe at Shooto 2020 vol.3 on May 31, 2020. Kurobe won the fight by a third-round technical knockout.

=== DEEP and Jewels ===
Oshima was scheduled to face Sakura Mori at Deep Jewels 29 on July 23, 2020, in her promotional debut with Jewels. Oshima won the fight by a second round double-wristlock submission.

Oshima was scheduled to fight Mizuki Oshiro for the vacant DEEP Microweight title at DEEP 97 Impact on September 20, 2020. Oshima won the fight by a first-round scrafhold-armlock submission.

Returning to Jewels, Oshima was scheduled to face Si Woo Park at Deep Jewels 31 on December 19, 2020. Park won the closely contested bout by unanimous decision.

==== Jewels Atomweight Grand Prix ====
Oshima took part in the Jewels Atomweight Grand Prix, organized to crown the new champion, as the title was left vacant following Tomo Maesawa's retirement. She was scheduled to fight Emi Tomimatsu at Deep Jewels 32 on March 7, 2021. She won the quarterfinal bout by a first-round submission, locking in an armlock after just 45 seconds.

Oshima faced Si Woo Park at Deep Jewels 33 on June 19, 2021, in the semifinals of the grand prix. Both the semifinals and finals were scheduled to take place on the same night. She won the fight with Park by a first-round submission, locking in an armbar from the bottom after being knocked down. Oshima faced Hikaru Aono in the finals, and won by unanimous decision, with scores of 20-18, 20-18 and 20-17.

==== Deep and Jewels title reign ====
Oshima faced the two-time Rizin FF atomweight title challenger Kanna Asakura at Rizin 31 - Yokohama on October 24, 2021. She won the bout via split decision. Following this victory, Oshima was ranked as the third best atomweight in the world by Fight Matrix, and second best by Sherdog.

Oshima faced Namiko Kawabata in a Super Atomweight bout at Deep Jewels 36 on March 12, 2022. She lost the bout via unanimous decision.

Oshima made her first Jewels Atomweight title defense against Moeri Suda at Deep Jewels 37 on May 8, 2022. She won the fight by a first-round technical submission, forcing a referee stoppage with a kimura lock.

After successfully defending her Jewels atomweight title for the first time, Oshima was booked to face the one-time Rizin Super Atomweight Championship title challenger Miyuu Yamamoto at Rizin 36 on July 2, 2022. She won the fight by split decision.

Oshima made her first DEEP Microweight (97 lb) Championship defense against Mizuki Furuse at DEEP 110 on November 12, 2022. She won the fight by a first-round submission, forcing Furuse to tap to an americana just 84 seconds into the opening round.

Oshima faced Yerin Hong at Black Combat 5: Song of the Sword on February 4, 2023. She won the fight by a third-round submission, as she forced Hong to tap to an armbar 59 seconds into the final round.

Oshima faced Pancrase Women's Strawweight champion Haruka Hasegawa in a strawweight non-title bout at Rizin 43 – Sapporo on June 24, 2023. She won the bout via first round scarf hold armlock.

Oshima made her second Jewels Atomweight Championship defense against Si Yoon Park at DEEP 115 on September 18, 2023. She lost the fight by unanimous decision.

Oshima faced Claire Lopez at Rizin Landmark 8 on February 24, 2024, stepping in on a week's notice, as a replacement for the injured Ayaka Hamasaki. She won the bout via second round armbar.

Oshima faced Aya Murakami at Deep Jewels 45 on May 26, 2024. She won the fight by a first-round technical knockout.

=== Invicta FC ===
Oshima faced Andressa Romero at Invicta FC 55 on June 28, 2024. She lost the fight by unanimous decision.

Oshima faced Ye Ji Lee at DEEP 125 Impact on May 5, 2025. She lost the fight by unanimous decision, with all three judges scoring the bout 29—28 for Lee.

Oshima faced Moeri Suda in a rematch after about three years at DEEP 127 Impact on September 15, 2025. She won the fight by unanimous decision.

== Championships and accomplishments ==
=== Mixed martial arts ===
- Shooto
  - 18th Shooto Kantō Amateur Atomweight Championship
  - 26th Shooto Kantō Amateur Atomweight Championship
- DEEP
  - DEEP Microweight Championship (Two times, current)
    - Two successful title defenses
- Jewels
  - Jewels Atomweight Championship (One time, former)
    - One successful title defense
  - Jewels Microweight Championship (current)

=== Judo ===
- International Judo Federation
  - 2009 World Cadets Championship Third Place (-40 kg)
- All Japan Judo Federation
  - 2011 All Japan Selected Junior Judo Championship Runner-up (-44 kg)
  - 2014 All Japan Selected Junior Judo Championship (-44 kg)

== Mixed martial arts record ==
Professional record breakdown
24 matches	17 wins	7 losses
By knockout	2	1
By submission	10	0
By decision	5	6

Res.	Record	Opponent	Method	Event	Date	Round	Time	Location	Notes
Win	17–7	Lee Ye-ji	Submission (kneebar)	Rizin Landmark 15	July 18, 2026	1	1:40	Hiroshima, Japan	
Win	16–7	Kate Oyama	Decision (unanimous)	Rizin 52	March 7, 2026	3	5:00	Tokyo, Japan	
Loss	15–7	Seika Izawa	Decision (unanimous)	Rizin Landmark 12	November 3, 2025	3	5:00	Kobe, Japan	For the Rizin Super Atomweight Championship.
Win	15–6	Moeri Suda	Decision (unanimous)	DEEP 127 Impact	September 15, 2025	3	5:00	Tokyo, Japan	
Loss	14–6	Lee Ye-ji	Decision (unanimous)	DEEP 125 Impact	May 5, 2025	3	5:00	Tokyo, Japan	
Loss	14–5	Andressa Romero	Decision (unanimous)	Invicta FC 55	June 28, 2024	3	5:00	Kansas City, Kansas, United States	Return to Atomweight.
Win	14–4	Aya Murakami	TKO (punches)	Deep Jewels 45	May 26, 2024	1	3:05	Tokyo, Japan	Defended the DEEP Women's Microweight Championship; Won the Jewels Microweight Championship.
Win	13–4	Claire Lopez	Submission (armbar)	Rizin Landmark 8	February 24, 2024	2	3:18	Saga, Japan	Super Atomweight bout.
Loss	12–4	Park Si-yoon	Decision (unanimous)	DEEP 115 Impact	September 18, 2023	3	5:00	Tokyo, Japan	Lost the Jewels Atomweight Championship.
Win	12–3	Haruka Hasegawa	Submission (scarf hold armlock)	Rizin 43	June 24, 2023	1	1:16	Sapporo, Japan	Strawweight debut.
Win	11–3	Hong Ye-rin	Submission (armbar)	Black Combat 5	February 4, 2023	3	0:59	Incheon, South Korea	Atomweight bout.
Win	10–3	Mizuki Furuse	Submission (scarf hold armlock)	DEEP 110 Impact	November 12, 2022	1	1:24	Tokyo, Japan	Defended the DEEP Women's Microweight Championship.
Win	9–3	Miyuu Yamamoto	Decision (split)	Rizin 36	July 2, 2022	3	5:00	Okinawa, Japan	Super Atomweight bout.
Win	8–3	Moeri Suda	Technical Submission (kimura)	Deep Jewels 37	May 8, 2022	1	2:58	Tokyo, Japan	Defended the Jewels Atomweight Championship.
Loss	7–3	Namiko Kawabata	Decision (unanimous)	Deep Jewels 36	March 12, 2022	2	5:00	Tokyo, Japan	
Win	7–2	Kanna Asakura	Decision (split)	Rizin 31	October 24, 2021	3	5:00	Yokohama, Japan	Super Atomweight bout.
Win	6–2	Hikaru Aono	Decision (unanimous)	Deep Jewels 33	June 20, 2021	2	5:00	Tokyo, Japan	Won the Deep Jewels Atomweight Grand Prix and the vacant Jewels Atomweight Championship.
Win	5–2	Park Si-woo	Technical Submission (armbar)	Deep Jewels 33	June 20, 2021	1	2:28	Tokyo, Japan	Deep Jewels Atomweight Grand Prix Semifinal.
Win	4–2	Emi Tomimatsu	Submission (kimura)	Deep Jewels 32	March 7, 2021	1	0:45	Tokyo, Japan	Deep Jewels Atomweight Grand Prix Quarterfinal.
Loss	3–2	Park Si-woo	Decision (unanimous)	Deep Jewels 31	December 19, 2020	3	5:00	Tokyo, Japan	Atomweight debut.
Win	3–1	Mizuki Oshiro	Submission (scarf hold armlock)	DEEP 97 Impact	September 20, 2020	1	2:09	Tokyo, Japan	Microweight debut. Won the vacant DEEP Women's Microweight Championship.
Win	2–1	Sakura Mori	Technical Submission (kimura)	Deep Jewels 29	July 23, 2020	2	2:10	Tokyo, Japan	Super Atomweight debut.
Loss	1–1	Mina Kurobe	TKO (punches)	Shooto 2020 Vol. 3	May 31, 2020	3	1:54	Tokyo, Japan	Catchweight (110 lb) bout.
Win	1–0	Yuki Ono	TKO (punches)	Shooto 2020 in Korakuen Hall	January 26, 2020	2	3:15	Tokyo, Japan	Catchweight (110 lb) bout.

Amateur record breakdown		
4 matches	4 wins	0 losses
By knockout	2	0
By decision	2	0

Res.	Record	Opponent	Method	Event	Date	Round	Time	Location	Notes
Win	4–0	Miku Nakamura	Decision (unanimous)	26th Shooto Kanto Amateur Championship	September 29, 2019	2	5:00	Tokyo, Japan	Won the 26th Shooto Kanto Amateur Atomweight Championship
Win	3–0	Mana Yamashita	Submission (armlock)	26th Shooto Kanto Amateur Championship	September 29, 2019	1	1:46	Tokyo, Japan	
Win	2–0	Haruna Kato	Submission (armlock)	26th Shooto Kanto Amateur Championship	September 29, 2019	1		Tokyo, Japan	
Win	1–0	Fumiko Sumi	Decision (unanimous)	18th Shooto Kanto Amateur Championship	July 21, 2019	2	5:00	Tokyo, Japan	Won the 18th Shooto Kanto Amateur Atomweight Championship

== See also ==
- List of female mixed martial artists
- List of Deep champions
- List of current mixed martial arts champions
