= Seika Izawa =

Japanese mixed martial artist (born 1997)

- Born: November 1, 1997 (age 28); Utsunomiya, Japan
- Native name: 伊澤星花
- Other names: Supernova
- Height: 5 ft 3 in (1.60 m)
- Weight: 108 lb (49 kg; 7 st 10 lb)
- Division: Atomweight; Strawweight
- Reach: 64 in (163 cm)
- Style: Wrestling, Judo, Sumo
- Stance: Orthodox
- Fighting out of: Kodaira, Tokyo, Japan
- Team: Takamoto Dojo
- Years active: 2020–present

Mixed martial arts record
- Total: 18
- Wins: 18
- By knockout: 1
- By submission: 10
- By decision: 7
- Losses: 0

Other information
- University: Tokyo Gakugei University
- Mixed martial arts record from Sherdog

Seika Izawa (Japanese: 伊澤星花, Seika Izawa; born November 1, 1997) is a Japanese mixed martial artist, currently competing in the atomweight division of Rizin Fighting Federation. She is the former Jewels Strawweight, Rizin Super Atomweight, and current Jewels Atomweight champion.

As of January 3, 2022, Izawa is ranked as the best atomweight in the world by both Fight Matrix and Sherdog.

== Personal life and background ==
Izawa began practicing judo at the age of four, and took up wrestling in the 4th grade of elementary school. Representing the Sakushin Gakuin High School, Izawa placed third in the 2012 Japanese National Junior High School Wrestling Tournament and fifth in the National High School Judo Championship. Izawa won the second place in the All Japan Women's Sumo Championship ultra-lightweight weight class.

Izawa graduated from the Tokyo Gakugei University with a master's degree in teaching on March 3, 2023.

On June 30, 2022, Izawa announced her engagement to fellow mixed martial artist Kosuke "CORO" Terashima. The pair was married on June 11, 2023.

== Mixed martial arts career ==
Izawa began training mixed martial arts in June 2020 due to the COVID-19 pandemic preventing her from competing in judo.

=== Jewels (2020–present) ===
==== Early success ====
Izawa made her professional debut against Mika Arai at Deep Jewels 30 on October 31, 2020. She won the fight by unanimous decision.

Izawa was scheduled to face the interim Jewels Strawweight champion Miki Motono in a non-title bout at Deep Jewels 32 on December 19, 2020. She won the fight by unanimous decision, with scores of 30–27, 30-27 and 29–28.

==== Strawweight Champion ====
Izawa and Miki Motono fought a rematch for the interim Jewels Strawweight Championship at Deep Jewels 33 on June 19, 2021. She won the fight by a first-round submission, forcing Motono to tap with an armbar at the 3:32 minute mark. It was the first stoppage victory of her professional career. Izawa was promoted to undisputed champion on March 15, 2022, after Mizuki Inoue vacated the belt.

Izawa made her atomweight debut against Si Woo Park at DEEP 104 Impact on October 23, 2021. She won the fight by unanimous decision, with scores of 28–27, 29-26 and 29–26. Park was deducted two points in the second round for an illegal soccer kick. Following this victory, Fight Matrix recognized Izawa as the fifth best atomweight in the world.

=== Rizin FF (2021–present) ===
==== Super Atomweight Champion ====
Izawa faced the reigning Rizin Super Atomweight champion Ayaka Hamasaki in a non-title match at Rizin 33 - Saitama on December 31, 2021. She won the fight by technical knockout, stopping Hamasaki with a mixture of grounded elbows and punches. It was the first knockout victory of her professional career. After beating Hamasaki, Izawa was ranked as the best atomweight in the world by both Fight Matrix and Sherdog.

Izawa challenged the reigning Rizin Super Atomweight champion Ayaka Hamasaki at Rizin 35 on April 16, 2022. She was once again able to utilize her superior grappling to win the fight by unanimous decision.

==== Super Atomweight Grand Prix ====
At a press conference held by Rizin on July 7, 2022, it was announced that Izawa would participate in an eight-women grand prix, with a ¥7,000,000 prize for the eventual tournament winner. Izawa faced the undefeated Laura Fontoura in the tournament quarterfinals, which were held at Rizin 37 - Saitama on July 31, 2022. She won the fight by a first-round submission, forcing Fontoura to tap with a guillotine choke at the 3:47 minute mark of the opening round.

Izawa was expected to face Rena Kubota in the tournament semifinals, at Rizin 38 on September 25, 2022. Kubota was forced to withdraw from the bout however, as the orbital bone fracture which she sustained in her previous fight hadn't yet healed. Kubota was replaced by Anastasiya Svetkivska. Izawa won the fight by a second-round submission, as she forced her opponent to tap to an armbar with just four seconds left in the round.

Izawa rematched Si Woo Park in the final of the Rizin Super Atomweight Grand Prix on December 31, 2022, at Rizin 40 She won the Grand Prix and the bout in a close bout via split decision.

==== Continued title reign ====
Izawa was expected to face the one-time Rizin Super Atomweight title challenger Miyuu Yamamoto in a non-title bout at Rizin 42 on May 6, 2023. The fight was postponed for New Year's Eve, as Yamamoto tore her anterior cruciate ligament in training and was forced to undergo surgery.

Izawa faced Suwanan Boonsorn in a women's super atomweight bout at Deep Jewels 41 on May 28, 2023. She won the fight by unanimous decision.

Izawa made her first Rizin Super Atomweight title defense against Claire Lopez at Super Rizin 2: Rizin X Bellator on July 30, 2023. She won the fight via ninja choke submission in the first round.

The match between Izawa and Miyuu Yamamoto in a non-title bout was rescheduled on December 31, 2023, at Rizin 45. She won the fight via rear-naked choke submission in the second round.

Izawa challenged Si Yoon Park for the Jewels Atomweight championship at Deep Jewels 44 on March 24, 2024. She won the fight via ninja choke submission in the second round.

Izawa faced Kanna Asakura in a non-title bout at Rizin 48 on September 29, 2024. She won the fight by unanimous decision.

Izawa faced Lucia Apdelgarim in a non-title bout at Rizin 49 on December 31, 2024. She won the fight via armbar submission in the first round.

Izawa formally vacated her Jewels Strawweight Championship on July 11, 2025.

Izawa faced Shin Yu-jin at Super Rizin 4 on July 27, 2025. Shin failed to make weight at the official weigh-ins, as she came in .5 lbs over the strawweight limit. Izawa won the fight by a first-round arm-triangle choke submission.

Izawa made her second Rizin Super Atomweight title defense against Saori Oshima at Rizin Landmark 12 on November 3, 2025. She won the bout via unanimous decision.

Izawa made her third Rizin Super Atomweight title defense against Rena Kubota at Rizin: Shiwasu no Cho Tsuwamono Matsuri on December 31, 2025. She won the fight by a second-round submission.

On April 12, 2026, at Rizin Landmark 13, Izawa announced she vacated the super atomweight title as she is pregnant.

== Championships and accomplishments ==
=== Grappling ===
- Japan Wrestling Federation
  - 2012 Junior Queen's Cup Runner-up (-52 kg)
  - 2012 All Japan Junior High School Championship Winner (-57 kg)
- All Japan Judo Federation
  - 2014 National Inter-High Judo Championship Third Place (-52 kg)
- Women's Sumo Association
  - 2019 All Japan Women's Sumo Championship Ultra-Lightweight 2nd Place (< 50 kg)

=== Mixed martial arts ===
- Jewels
  - Jewels Strawweight Championship (One time; former)
  - Jewels Atomweight championship (One time; current)
- Rizin FF
  - Rizin FF Women's Super Atomweight Championship (One time; former)
    - Three successful title defenses
  - 2022 Rizin Women's Super Atomweight Grand Prix Champion
- eFight
  - 2x "Fighter of the Month" (April 2022, March 2024)
- Fight Matrix
  - 2022 Female Fighter of the Year
  - Women's Atomweight Lineal Championship (One time; current)
- MMA Fighting
  - 2022 Third Team MMA All-Star
  - 2023 First Team MMA All-Star
  - 2024 Second Team MMA All-Star
  - 2025 First Team MMA All-Star
- Uncrowned
  - 2025 #5 Ranked Women's Fighter of the Year

== Mixed martial arts record ==
Professional record breakdown
18 matches	18 wins	0 losses
By knockout	1	0
By submission	10	0
By decision	7	0

Res.	Record	Opponent	Method	Event	Date	Round	Time	Location	Notes
Win	18–0	Rena Kubota	Submission (guillotine choke)	Rizin: Shiwasu no Cho Tsuwamono Matsuri	December 31, 2025	2	1:58	Saitama, Japan	Defended the Rizin Super Atomweight Championship. Vacated title on April 12, 2026.
Win	17–0	Saori Oshima	Decision (unanimous)	Rizin Landmark 12	November 3, 2025	3	5:00	Kobe, Japan	Defended the Rizin Super Atomweight Championship.
Win	16–0	Shin Yu-jin	Submission (arm-triangle choke)	Super Rizin 4	July 27, 2025	1	2:24	Saitama, Japan	Strawweight bout; Shin missed weight (116.5 lb).
Win	15–0	Lucia Apdelgarim	Submission (triangle armbar)	Rizin 49	December 31, 2024	1	2:21	Saitama, Japan	Non-title bout.
Win	14–0	Kanna Asakura	Decision (unanimous)	Rizin 48	September 29, 2024	3	5:00	Saitama, Japan	Non-title bout.
Win	13–0	Park Si-yoon	Submission (ninja choke)	Deep Jewels 44	March 24, 2024	2	0:58	Tokyo, Japan	Won the Jewels Atomweight championship.
Win	12–0	Miyuu Yamamoto	Submission (rear-naked choke)	Rizin 45	December 31, 2023	2	0:37	Saitama, Japan	Non-title bout.
Win	11–0	Claire Lopez	Submission (ninja choke)	Super Rizin 2	July 30, 2023	1	1:06	Saitama, Japan	Defended the Rizin Super Atomweight Championship.
Win	10–0	Suwanan Boonsorn	Submission (triangle choke)	Deep Jewels 41	May 28, 2023	1	3:31	Tokyo, Japan	
Win	9–0	Park Si-woo	Decision (split)	Rizin 40	December 31, 2022	3	5:00	Saitama, Japan	Won the 2022 Rizin Super Atomweight Grand Prix.
Win	8–0	Anastasiya Svetkivska	Submission (armbar)	Rizin 38	September 25, 2022	2	4:56	Saitama, Japan	2022 Rizin Super Atomweight Grand Prix Semifinal.
Win	7–0	Laura Fontoura	Submission (guillotine choke)	Rizin 37	July 31, 2022	1	3:47	Saitama, Japan	2022 Rizin Super Atomweight Grand Prix Quarterfinal.
Win	6–0	Ayaka Hamasaki	Decision (unanimous)	Rizin 35	April 17, 2022	3	5:00	Chōfu, Japan	Won the Rizin Super Atomweight Championship.
Win	5–0	Ayaka Hamasaki	TKO (elbows and punches)	Rizin 33	December 31, 2021	2	2:50	Saitama, Japan	Non-title bout.
Win	4–0	Park Si-woo	Decision (unanimous)	DEEP 104 Impact	October 23, 2021	3	5:00	Tokyo, Japan	Super Atomweight debut.
Win	3–0	Miki Motono	Submission (armbar)	Deep Jewels 33	June 19, 2021	1	3:32	Tokyo, Japan	Won the interim Jewels Strawweight Championship. Later promoted to undisputed champion. Vacated title on July 11, 2025.
Win	2–0	Miki Motono	Decision (unanimous)	Deep Jewels 32	March 7, 2021	3	5:00	Tokyo, Japan	Strawweight debut.
Win	1–0	Mika Arai	Decision (unanimous)	Deep Jewels 30	October 31, 2020	3	5:00	Tokyo, Japan	Catchweight (120 lb) bout.

== Jiu-jitsu record ==
4 Win, 0 Losses, 1 Draw, 0 No Contest
Date	Result	Opponent	Event	Location	Method	Round	Time
2021-09-04	Win	(Japan) Mika Nagano	Deep Jewels 34	Tokyo, Japan	Submission (heel hook)	1	0:50
2021-09-04	Win	(Japan) Emi Tomimatsu	Deep Jewels 34	Tokyo, Japan	Submission (armbar)	1	3:51
2021-03-07	Win	(Japan) Megumi Sugimoto	Deep Jewels 32	Tokyo, Japan	Submission (rear-naked choke)	1	0:58
2020-11-29	Win	(Japan) Sakura Mori	DEEP & Pancrase Osaka	Osaka, Japan	Decision (Unanimous)		
2020-08-30	Draw	(Japan) Yuki Sugiuchi	ZST Battle Hazard 07	Tokyo, Japan	Decision (Time Limit)	1	7:00
Legend: Win Loss Draw/No contest Notes

== See also ==
- List of female mixed martial artists
- List of current Rizin FF fighters
- List of undefeated mixed martial artists
