= Miyuu Yamamoto =

Japanese mixed martial artist and freestyle wrestler

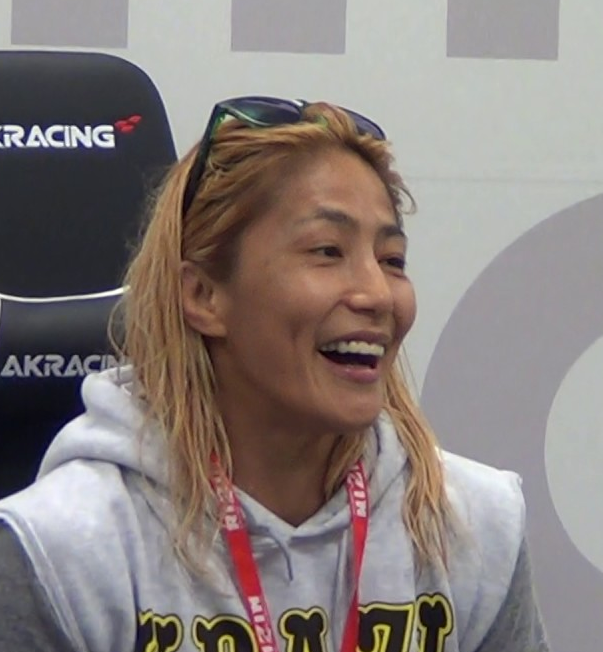
- Born: 山本 美憂; 4 August 1974 (age 52); Kawasaki, Kanagawa, Japan
- Other names: Fighting Queen Bee
- Nationality: Japan; Canada
- Height: 5 ft 1 in (1.55 m)
- Weight: 108 lb (49 kg; 7.7 st)
- Division: Atomweight (MMA); Strawweight (Wrestling)
- Style: Wrestling
- Fighting out of: Guam
- Team: Krazy Bee
- Wrestling: Freestyle wrestling
- Years active: 2016–2023 (MMA); 1987–2015 (wrestling)

Mixed martial arts record
- Total: 13
- Wins: 6
- By decision: 6
- Losses: 7
- By knockout: 2
- By submission: 4
- By decision: 1

Other information
- Mixed martial arts record from Sherdog

Miyuu Yamamoto (山本 美憂, Yamamoto Miyū; born 4 August 1974) is a Japanese former female freestyle wrestler and mixed martial artist. Yamamoto is a three-time freestyle wrestling world champion and a Rizin Women's Super Atomweight title contender in MMA. She is represented with Krazy Bee.

== Personal life ==
Miyuu Yamamoto is married to her husband, Kyle, who has two coffee shops in Guam. Yamamoto enjoys brewing her own coffee and hopes to open her own coffee shop in Japan. After she's done fighting, she hopes to travel the world trying all types of coffee.

== Biography ==
Her father, 1972 Summer Olympics wrestling representative, and Nippon Sport Science University Professor Ikuei Yamamoto made a wrestling gifted education with his son Norifumi "Kid" Yamamoto and his sister Seiko Yamamoto from her elementary school age. At the age of thirteen she won the 1st Japan Women's Championship. After that, she achieved four consecutive victories in all Japan, but she was not allowed to participate in the World Wrestling Championships due to the age limit. In 1991, she won the world's first championship which she participated for the first time at the age of seventeen as the youngest ever in history.

After that she won the world championships in 1994 and 1995. In 1994 she participated in the All Japan Women's Pro-Wrestling Tokyo Dome competition with Kyoko Hamaguchi. In 1995 she married Nobuyasu Ikeda at the J.League Urawa Red Diamonds (former) and retired from active service. After that, she gave birth to her first child (Arsen Yamamoto). But in April 1999, they divorced.

In 1999 she temporarily returned to active service, temporarily entered the Queen's Cup Final, won the Asian Championships and won the All Japan Women's Wrestling Championship, but in July 2000 she remarried to Enson Inoue, a fighter and retired from active service.

She later returned to active service on the occasion that women's wrestling becoming the official event for the first time at the 2004 Summer Olympics. Although it aimed for her Athens Olympic appearance, she finished third in the "Japan Queen's Cup" (Athens Olympic national team selection game) in February 2004, and she could not play her Olympic appearances. She later retired from active services in April of the same year. In the same year, she divorced Enson Inoue.

In April 2006, she later married Akira Sasaki, representative of the 2006 Winter Olympics men's alpine skiing (her third marriage). They celebrated the birth of their baby ceremony in the same year, a boy who became her second child in December of the same year. In November 2008, she gave birth to a girl Mia who is her third child.

She belonged to Sports Biz and acts as a sports caster, as well as a leader of Kids' Wrestling at the NPO Japan Sports Network (JSN).

She returned to active duties in June 2011. She aimed to participate in the 2012 Summer Olympics, winning the All Japan Women's Open Championship on 16 October. She divorced Akira Sasaki (her third divorce). Although she participated in the All Japan Selection Championship in December, she lost the judgment in the second round and missed her Olympic appearance.

In 2013 she moved her life base to Toronto, Canada and worked. In December of the same year, she participated in the Nordhagen Classic Games in the 51 kg class and won the championship.

She won the third prize in the Canadian Cup on 5 July 2014. She acquired Canadian citizenship in December 2015, and aimed to participate in the 2016 Summer Olympics as a Canada representative.

On 1 August 2016, as a result of the closing of the Rio Olympic appearance road, she announced participation in mixed martial arts. Also the Rizin Fighting World Grand-Prix 2016 held on 25 September the same year was announced as she participated in the opening round of the indiscriminate class tournament, the opponent of the debut match is the "Queen of Shoot Boxing" Rena Kubota, with one loss. On 31 December, also in the same year, she went to the Rizin Fighting World Grand-Prix 2016 against the KOTC female straw class champion Andy Winn at the Indiscriminate Tournament Final Round, and suffered a second consecutive defeat.

In March 2017, she showed her bold figure entitled "The Strongest Nudity" at the photographic weekly magazine Flash (Kobunsha), and the first nude photo album Queen was released in May.

== Mixed martial arts career ==
While Yamamoto was aiming for the Olympics, she didn't see her dreams realized. Then, Nobuyuki Sakakibara approached her about fighting for Rizin Fighting Federation. Yamamoto decided then to transition from wrestling to MMA.

On 2 June 2019, Miyuu faced Kanna Asakura at Rizin 16. She won the bout via unanimous decision.

Next, Miyuu faced Seo Hee Ham at Rizin 19 on 12 October 2019. She lost the fight via technical knockout in the second round.

Yamamoto was scheduled to fight former Rizin Super Atomweight Champion Ayaka Hamasaki for the vacant RIZIN atomweight title. In the lead up to the fight, Yamamoto took time off in the COVID-19 pandemic to improve herself as a mixed martial artist. She faced Hamasaki on 31 December 2020 for the vacant RIZIN Super Atomweight belt. Miyuu lost the bout via first-round submission.

Yamamoto faced Rena Kubota at Rizin 32 on 20 November 2021. She lost the bout after getting caught with a knee on a takedown attempt.

Yamamoto faced the DEEP Microweight and Jewels Atomweight champion Saori Oshima at Rizin 36 on 2 July 2022. She lost the fight by split decision.

Yamamoto was expected to face Rizin Super Atomweight champion Seika Izawa in a non-title bout at Rizin 42 on May 6, 2023. The bout postponed for New Year's Eve, as Yamamoto suffered a torn ACL in training. She lost the fight via rear-naked choke submission in the second round.

== Other ==
- The name "Miyuu" was named after Mr. Munich, whose father participated as the Olympic representative.
- Arsen Yamamoto, her eldest son, also learned wrestling from his grandfather, Ikuei Yamamoto, and has been active in decorating the victory at Greco Roman 69 kg class at the National Boys Competition 66 kg class in 2008 and the FILA Cadet World Championships at 2013. She aimed to win gold medals at the Summer Olympics in 2016.
- In addition to having similar family circumstances, she has work patterns with sports caster Animal Hamaguchi (Heigo Hamaguchi) and his close-parent daughter Kyoko.

== Mixed martial arts record ==
Professional record breakdown
14 matches	6 wins	8 losses
By knockout	0	2
By submission	0	5
By decision	6	1

Res.	Record	Opponent	Method	Event	Date	Round	Time	Location	Notes
Loss	6–8	Seika Izawa	Submission (rear-naked choke)	Rizin 45	31 December 2023	2	0:37	Saitama, Japan	Retirement bout.
Loss	6–7	Saori Oshima	Decision (split)	Rizin 36	2 July 2022	3	5:00	Okinawa, Japan	
Loss	6–6	Rena Kubota	TKO (knee and punches)	Rizin 32	20 November 2021	2	3:35	Okinawa, Japan	
Loss	6–5	Ayaka Hamasaki	Submission (leg scissor choke)	Rizin 26	31 December 2020	1	1:42	Saitama, Japan	For the Rizin Super Atomweight Championship.
Win	6–4	Suwanan Boonsorn	Decision (unanimous)	Rizin 20	31 December 2019	3	5:00	Saitama, Japan	
Loss	5–4	Seo Hee Ham	TKO (punches)	Rizin 19	12 October 2019	2	9:42	Osaka, Japan	
Win	5–3	Kanna Asakura	Decision (unanimous)	Rizin 16	2 June 2019	3	5:00	Kobe, Japan	
Win	4–3	Mika Nagano	Decision (unanimous)	Rizin 14	31 December 2018	3	5:00	Saitama, Japan	Catchweight (112 lb) bout.
Win	3–3	Andy Nguyen	Decision (unanimous)	Rizin 13	30 September 2018	3	5:00	Saitama, Japan	
Win	2–3	Saori Ishioka	Decision (split)	Rizin 11	29 July 2018	3	5:00	Saitama, Japan	
Loss	1–3	Irene Cabello Rivera	Submission (armbar)	Rizin World Grand Prix 2017: Opening Round - Part 2	15 October 2017	2	2:25	Fukuoka, Japan	2017 Rizin Super Atomweight Grand Prix Quarterfinal.
Win	1–2	Cassie Robb	Decision (unanimous)	Rizin World Grand Prix 2017: Opening Round - Part 1	30 July 2017	3	5:00	Saitama, Japan	
Loss	0–2	Andy Nguyen	Submission (armbar)	Rizin World Grand Prix 2016: Final Round	31 December 2016	1	4:42	Saitama, Japan	
Loss	0–1	Rena Kubota	Submission (guillotine choke)	Rizin World Grand Prix 2016: 1st Round	25 September 2016	1	4:50	Saitama, Japan	

== Wrestling accomplishments ==
- 1987 All-Japan Women's Championship 44 kg class win
- 1988 All-Japan Women's Championship 44 kg class win
- 1989 All Japan Women's Open 44 kg class win
- 1989 All-Japan Women's Championship 47 kg class win
- 1990 All Japan Women's Open 47 kg class win
- 1990 All Japan Women's championship 47 kg class win
- 1990 All Japan Women's Open 47 kg class win
- 1991 All Japan Women's Championship 47 kg class win
- 1991 World Women's Championship 47 kg class win
- 1993 All-Japan Women's Open 50 kg class Second Prize
- 1994 All-Japan Women's Championship 50 kg class win
- 1994 World Women's Championship 50 kg class win
- 1995 All-Japan Women's Championship 47 kg class win
- 1995 World Women's Championship 47 kg class win
- 1998 Japan Women's Championship 46 kg class third place
- 1998 World Women's Championship 46 kg Class Second Prize
- 1999 Japan Queen's Cup 46 kg class Second Prize
- 1999 All-Japan Championship 46 kg class win
- 2002 All-Japan Championship 48 kg class Final T1 race lost
- 2003 Dave Schulz Memorial International Convention 48 kg class Second Prize
- 2003 Japan Queen's Cup 48 kg class Second Prize
- 2003 All Japan women's championship 48 kg class third place
- 2004 Japan Queen's Cup in 48 kg class third place
- 2011 All Japan Women's Open Championship 48 kg class win
- 2011 NYAC Holiday Open International Convention 48 kg class third place
- 2011 All-Japan Championship 48 kg class eliminated second round
- 2011 All-Japan Selection Championship 51 kg class lost second round
- 2012 Canadian Cup 48 kg class third place
- 2013 Nordhagen Classic contest 51 kg class win
- 2014 Canadian Cup 48 kg class third place
- 2015 Canadian Cup 53 kg class 4th place

== Bibliography ==
=== Magazines ===
- Flash (No. 1 November 2016, No. 28 March/4 April 2017, No. 25 April 2017, No. 23 May 2017, Kobunsha)

=== Photo albums ===
- Queen (26 May 2017, Kobunsha, Photographer: Hidekazu Maiyama) ISBN 978-4-33-490221-6
