= Aichi Prefectural Gymnasium =

Multi-purpose gymnasium in Nagoya, Japan

Coordinates: 35°10′59.11″N 136°54′9.22″E

- Dolphins Arena logo (2018-2025)

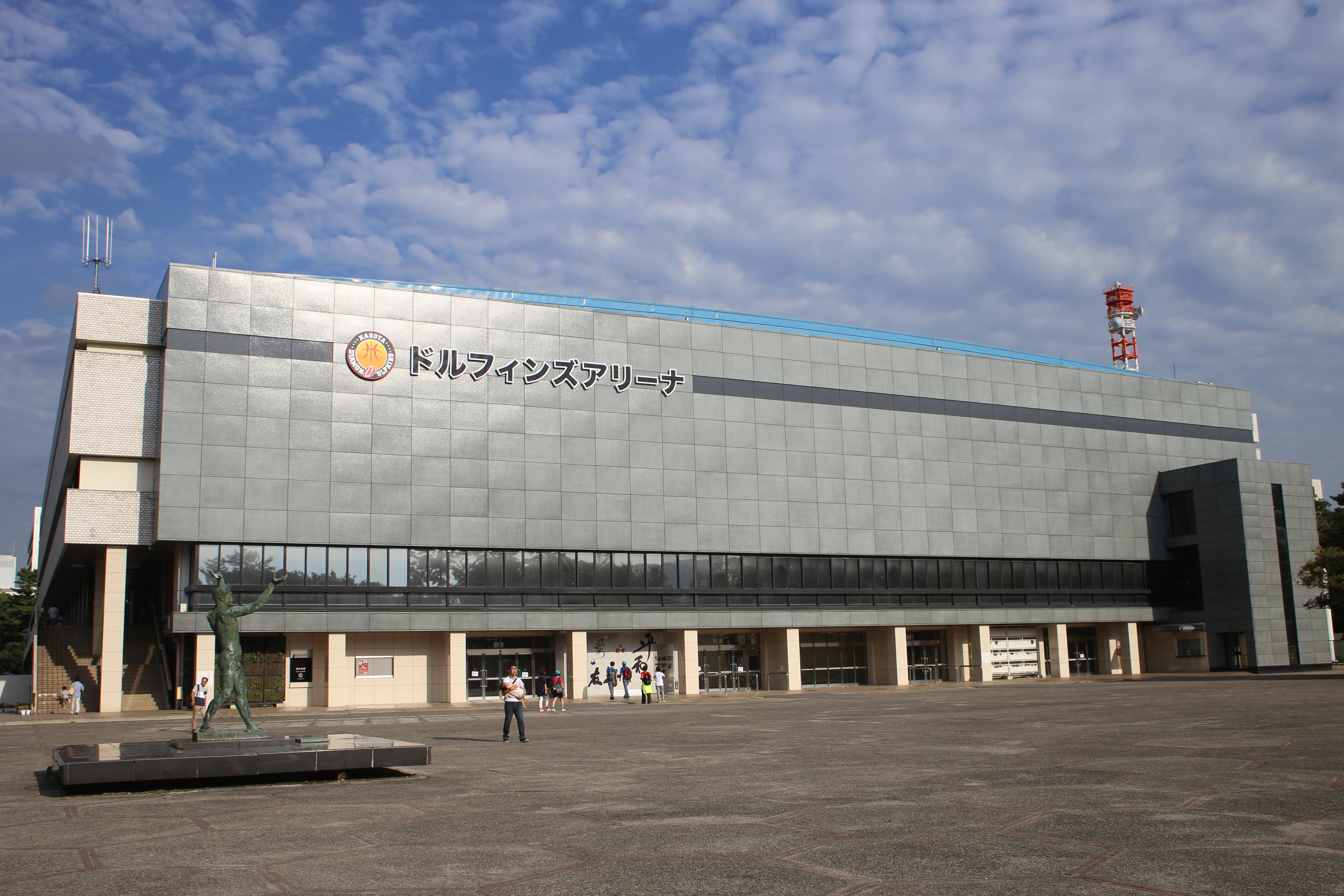
- front view
- Interactive map of Aichi Prefectural Gymnasium
- Full name: Aichi Prefectural Gymnasium
- Location: Naka-ku, Nagoya, Aichi
- Owner: Aichi Prefecture
- Operator: Aichi Prefecture
- Capacity: 7,515
- Scoreboard: Diamond Vision LED centerhung scoreboard

Construction
- Opened: 1964
- Closed: March 31, 2026
- Architect: Katsumi Nakayama
- Main contractor: Toda Corporation

Tenants
- Nagoya Diamond Dolphins; Mitsubishi Electric Koalas

Website
- http://www.aichi-kentai.com/

Aichi Prefectural Gymnasium (愛知県体育館, Aichi-ken Taiikukan) was a multi-purpose gymnasium in Nagoya, Japan, built in 1964.

== Overview ==
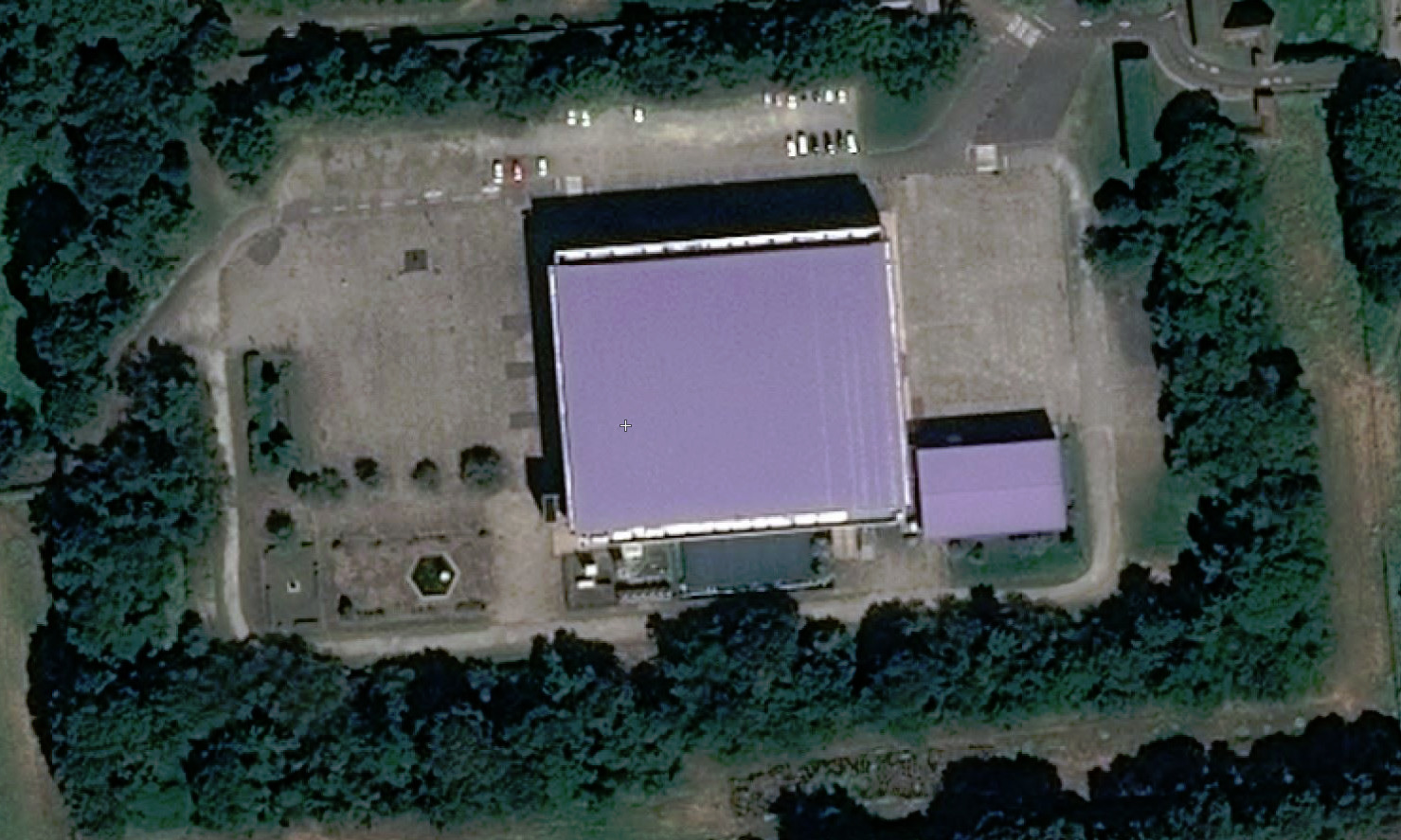
Satellite view

Located on the site of the secondary enclosure of Nagoya Castle, it was host to numerous concerts and events. Beyonce performed there on April 14, 2007 as part of her tour The Beyoncé Experience. The gymnasium had 4,375 fixed seats and could accommodate an additional 3,032 on the floor for certain events, giving it a total maximum capacity of 7,407.

It won the 7th annual Building Contractors Society Award in 1966.

Professional Sumo's July Grand Sumo Tournament was held at the site every year from the second until the fourth Sunday in July. Beginning in 2025, the tournament moved to the nearby Aichi International Arena (IG Arena), owned and operated by Anschutz Entertainment Group.

It was the home arena of the Nagoya Diamond Dolphins of the B.League. Dolphins acquired its naming rights (JPY 25 million, three years) in 2018. The naming rights agreement expired on June 30, 2025.

In conjunction with the opening of the Aichi International Arena, the Aichi Prefectural Gymnasium terminated the general use on June 30, 2025, and it terminated the temporary use on March 31, 2026.

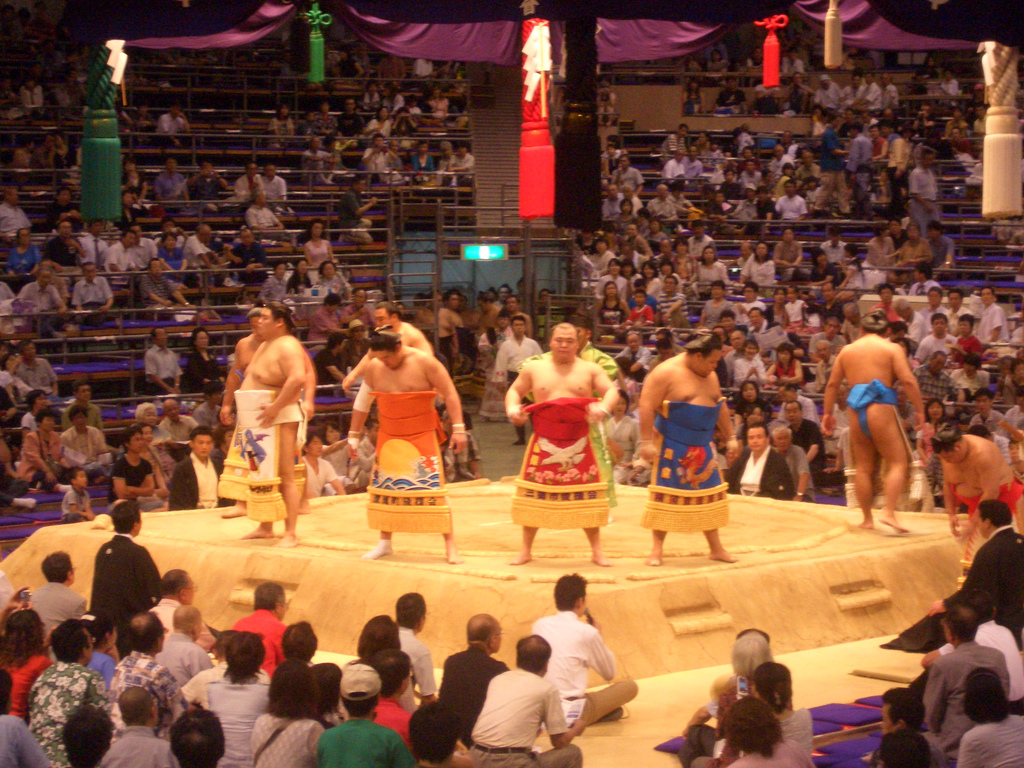
Grand Sumo Nagoya Tournament

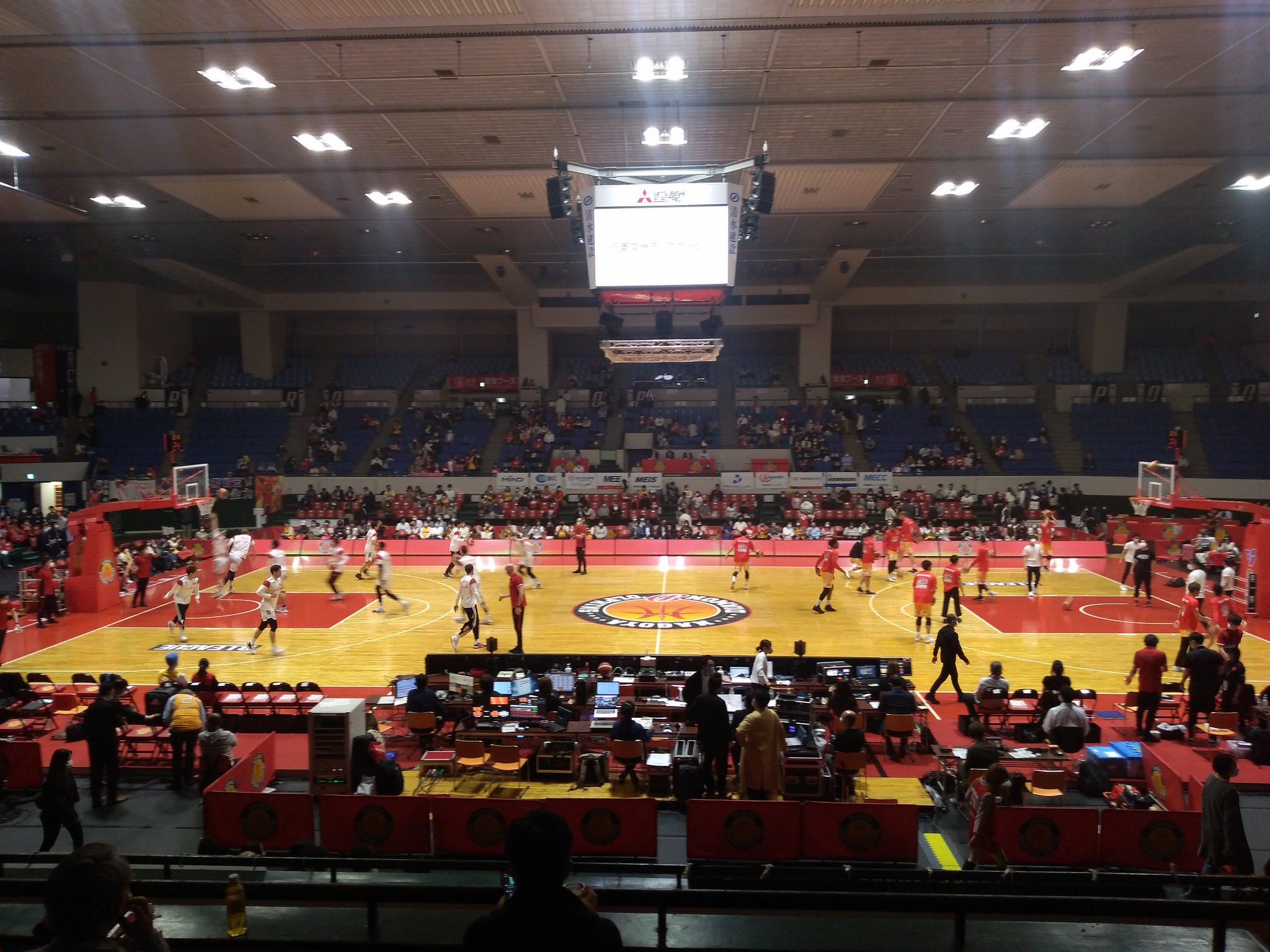
Nagoya Diamond Dolphins
