= Ryō (given name) =

- Gender: Unisex, predominantly male

Origin
- Origin: Japanese
- Meaning: Depends on kanji used.
- Region of origin: Japanese

Ryō (りょう, リョウ) is a unisex Japanese given name. It is sometimes romanized as Ryou, Ryoh, or Ryo.

== Kanji ==
The meaning of the name differs based on the kanji used to write it. Kanji used to write this name include:

- 了: "completion"
- 涼: "cold/cool"
- 燎, "to burn", "to illuminate"
- 椋: Aphananthe aspera (a species of tree)
- 良: "goodness"
- 亮: "light"
- 綾: "silk"
- 諒: "forgiveness"
- 龍/竜: "dragon"
- 遼: "distant, far"

== People ==
=== Film and television ===
==== Directors and producers ====
- Ryo Sugimoto (born 1976, 亮), Japanese film and television director

==== Live film and television actors ====
- Ryō (actress) (born 1973, りょう), Japanese model and actress
- Ryo Hayami (born 1945, 亮), Japanese actor
- Ryō Ikebe (1918–2010, 良), Japanese actor
- Ryo Ishibashi (born 1956, 凌), Japanese actor
- Ryo Kase (born 1974, 亮), Japanese actor
- Ryo Kato (born 1990, 諒), Japanese actor and television personality
- Ryo Katsuji (born 1986, 涼), Japanese actor
- Ryo Kimura (born 1988, 了), Japanese actor
- Ryo Kitazono (born 1992, 涼), Japanese actor, singer, Satsuma Ambassador
- Ryo Narita (born 1993, 凌), Japanese actor and model
- Ryo Narushima (born 1971, 涼), Japanese actress
- Ryo Matsuda (born 1991, 凌), Japanese actor
- Ryo Ryusei (born 1993, 涼), Japanese actor
- Ryo Segawa (born 1978, 亮), Japanese actor
- Ryo Takeuchi (born 1993, 崚), Japanese actor known as Ryoma Takeuchi
- Ryō Tamura (actor) (born 1946, 亮), Japanese actor
- Ryo Yoshizawa (born 1994, 亮), Japanese actor

==== Voice actors ====
- Ryō Hirohashi (born 1978, 涼), Japanese voice actress
- Ryō Horikawa (born 1958, りょう), Japanese voice actor
- Ryō Ishihara (born 1931, 良), Japanese voice actor
- Ryō Naitō (born 1974, 玲), Japanese voice actor

==== Comedians ====
- Ryō Tamura (comedian) (born 1972, 亮), Japanese comedian and television presenter

=== Illustrators and writers ===
- Ryō Azumi (椋), Japanese manga artist
- Ryo Ikuemi (born 1964, 綾), Japanese manga artist
- Ryō Hanmura (1933–2002, 良), Japanese science fiction novelist
- Ryo Mizuno (born 1963, 良), Japanese author and game designer
- Ryō Ramiya (涼), Japanese manga artist
- Ryo Sasaki (亮), Japanese manga artist
- Ryo Takamisaki (born 1963, 諒), Japanese manga artist
- Ryo Tokita (born 1969), Japanese-born American artist

=== Music ===
- Ryo, leader of the Japanese musical group Supercell
- Ryo Fukui (born 1948), Japanese pianist
- Ryo Fukawa (born 1974, りょう), Japanese comedian and musician
- Ryo Kagawa (1947–2017, 良), Japanese singer, songwriter, and musician
- Ryo Kawakita (born 1978, 亮), member of Maximum the Hormone band
- Ryo Kawasaki (born 1947, 燎), Japanese jazz fusion guitarist
- Ryō Nagamatsu (born 1982, 亮), Japanese composer
- Ryo Noda (born 1945, 燎), Japanese composer and saxophonist
- Ryo Okumoto (born 1959, 亮), Japanese rock keyboardist
- Ryo Owatari (born 1972, 亮), Japanese guitarist
- Ryo Nishikido (born 1984, 亮), Japanese idol, actor, singer, and former member of the J-pop group Kanjani8
- Ryō Takahashi (musician) (born 1985), Japanese musician and composer

=== Politics and government ===
- Narasaki Ryō (1841–1906, 龍), wife of Sakamoto Ryōma, an architect of the Meiji Restoration
- Ryō Kurusu (1919–1945, 良), officer in the Imperial Japanese Army
- Ryo Shuhama (born 1950, 了), Japanese politician with the Democratic Party of Japan

=== Sport ===
==== Baseball ====
- Ryo Akiyoshi (born 1989, 亮), Japanese baseball player
- Ryo Hidaka (born 1990, 亮), Japanese baseball player
- Ryo Hijirisawa (born 1985, 諒), Japanese baseball outfielder
- Ryo Hirai (born 1991, 諒), Japanese baseball player
- Ryo Sakata (born 1986, 遼), Japanese baseball player
- Ryo Watanabe (pitcher) (渡辺 亮; born 1982), Japanese baseball player
- Ryo Watanabe (infielder) (渡邉 諒; born 1995), Japanese baseball player

==== Football ====
- Ryo Adachi (born 1969, 亮), Japanese football player
- Ryo Fukudome (born 1978), Japanese football player
- Ryo Hiraide (born 1991, 涼), Japanese football player
- Ryo Kanazawa (born 1988), Japanese football player
- Ryo Kobayashi (born 1982, 亮), Japanese football player
- Ryo Kubota (disambiguation), multiple people
- Ryo Kushino (born 1979, 亮), Japanese football player
- Ryo Matsumura (born 1994, 亮), Japanese football player
- Ryo Miyaichi (born 1992, 亮), Japanese football player contracted to the 2. Bundesliga
- Ryo Nagai (born 1991, 龍), Japanese football player
- Ryo Niizato (新里 涼; born 1995), Japanese footballer
- Ryo Nojima (born 1979), Japanese football player
- Ryo Nurishi (born 1986, 亮), Japanese football player
- Ryo Okui (born 1994, 諒), Japanese football player
- Ryo Sato (footballer) (佐藤 亮; born 1997), Japanese footballer
- Ryo Sakai (born 1977, 良), Japanese football player
- Ryo Shimazaki (島崎 竜; born 1997), Japanese footballer
- Ryo Shinzato (born 1990, 亮), Japanese football player
- Ryo Tadokoro (born 1986, 諒), Japanese football player
- Ryo Takahashi (footballer, born 1993) (高橋 諒), Japanese footballer
- Ryo Takahashi (footballer, born 2000) (高橋 亮), Japanese footballer
- Ryo Takeuchi (born 1991, 涼), Japanese football player
- Ryo Wada (和田 凌; born 1995), Japanese footballer
- Ryo Watanabe (footballer, born September 1996), Japanese footballer
- Ryo Watanabe (footballer, born October 1996) (渡邉 りょう), Japanese footballer

==== Other sport ====
- Ryō Aono (born 1990, 令), Japanese snowboarder
- Ryo Chonan (born 1976, 亮), Japanese mixed martial artist
- Ryo Fukuda (born 1979, 良), Japanese racing driver
- Ryo Ishikawa (born 1991, 遼), Japanese professional golfer
- Ryo Kawamura (born 1981, 亮), Japanese mixed martial artist
- Ryo Kiyuna (born 1990), Okinawan karateka
- Ryo Michigami (born 1973, 龍), Japanese racing driver
- Ryo Miyazaki (亮), Japanese boxer
- Ryo Miyake (born 1990, 諒), Japanese fencer
- Ryo Mizunami (born 1988), Japanese professional wrestler and mixed martial artist
- Ryo Mizuno (motorcyclist) (水野 涼; born 1998), Japanese motorcycle racer
- Ryo Saito (了), Japanese professional wrestler
- Ryo Sato (high jumper) (佐藤 凌; born 1994), Japanese high jumper
- Ryo Shibata (born 1987, 嶺), Japanese competitive figure skater
- Ryo Tanaka (born 1987, 遼), Japanese hockey player
- Ryo Tateishi (born 1989), Japanese swimmer
- Ryō Yamamura (born 1981, 亮), Japanese rugby union player
- Ryo Yamamoto (born 1984, 亮), Japanese long-distance runner
- Ryo Yuzawa (遊澤 亮; born 1976), Japanese table tennis player

=== Others ===
- Ryo Ichiriki (一力 遼; born 1997), Japanese Go player
- Ryō Shimamoto, Japanese shogi player

== Characters ==
- Ryo Akiyama, Digimon Tamers character
- Ryō Akizuki, a character in The Idolmaster Dearly Stars and The Idolmaster SideM
- Ryo Asuka, Devilman character
- Ryo Bakura, Yu-Gi-Oh! character
- Ryō Fujibayashi, character in Clannad.
- Ryo Hayakawa, main protagonist of Princess Nine.
- Ryo Hazuki, Shenmue protagonist
- Ryo Kiritani, Valorant character
- Ryō Kunieda, Bleach character
- Ryō Kurokiba, Shokugeki no Soma character
- Ryo Kurosawa, Battle Royale II character
- Ryo Kuroyanagi, Yakitate!! Japan character
- Ryo Marufuji, Yu-Gi-Oh! GX character
- Ryō Misaki, .hack character, the player behind Sora and Haseo.
- Ryo Narushima, the protagonist of Shamo
- Ryo Okayasu, character in Peach Girl
- Ryo Saeba, the main character of City Hunter
- Ryo Sakazaki, Art of Fighting character
- Ryō Sakurai, a character in Kuroko's Basketball
- Ryo Sanada, character in Ronin Warriors
- Ryo Urawa, character in Sailor Moon
- Ryo Shiba, character in Dancouga – Super Beast Machine God
- Ryō Shinonome, a character in Cinderella Nine
- Ryou Shirogane, Tokyo Mew Mew character
- Ryo Shishio, character in Kekkaishi
- "Tenkasei" Ryo, character in Gosei Sentai Dairanger
- Ryo Watanabe, the Showdown King in the 2007 racing game Need for Speed: ProStreet
- Ryō Shijima, a main character in Psycho Dream
- Ryō Yoshizawa, a character in Corpse Party
- Ryō Yumimura, a character in Ultraman Dyna
- Ryō Shishido, character in The Prince of Tennis
- Ryō Kisarazu, character in The Prince of Tennis
- Ryō Yoake, a character in ReLIFE
- Ryō Jikawa, a character in Inazuma Eleven
- Ryō Shimazaki, character in Mob Psycho 100
- Ryō Yamada, character in Bocchi the Rock!
- Ryo Ishikawa, the main antagonist in the video game Shogo: Mobile Armor Division
