= Girls S-Cup =

Annual women's kickboxing tournament

Girls S-Cup is an annual women's kickboxing tournament promoted by Takeshi Caesar's Shoot Boxing Association and competed under shoot boxing rules. The tournament format is the 8-woman single elimination. Caesar Gym star Rena Kubota has dominated the tournament since its inauguration in 2009.

== Shoot Boxing Girls Tournament 2009 ==
Shoot Boxing Girls Tournament 2009
- Promotion: Shoot Boxing Association, JEWELS
- Date: August 23, 2009
- Venue: Stellar Ball, Shinagawa Prince Hotel
- City: Tokyo, Japan

Event chronology
Shoot Boxing Girls Tournament 2009	Shoot Boxing World Tournament Girls S-Cup 2010

Shoot Boxing Girls Tournament 2009 or Girls S-Cup 2009 was the event that featured the first of Girls S-Cup tournaments. The event was promoted by the Shoot Boxing Association and JEWELS MMA promotion. It was competed in the 52 kg weight class, also featuring a 57 kg opening match and the semi-final for the Shoot Boxing women's open weight tournament. The event also featured an MMA match under co-promoter JEWELS' rules.

Retired mixed martial artist and kickboxer Hisae Watanabe declined to participate in the tournament due to an injury and instead faced Megumi Fujii at an exhibition match under "mixed" shoot boxing and JEWELS rules.

Shoot Boxing Girls Tournament 2009 Results
Opening Fight –57 kg: Shoot Boxing Rules / 2Min. 2R Ext.1R
(Japan) HARI def. Kanako Oka (Japan)
HARI defeated Oka by 3rd round Unanimous Decision 3-0.
Girls S-Cup '09 Quarter-finals: Shoot Boxing Rules / 2Min. 2R Ext.1R
(Japan) RENA def. Masako Yoshida (Japan)
RENA defeated Yoshida by 3rd round Unanimous Decision 3-0.
(Japan) Saori Ishioka def. Ai Takahashi (Japan)
Ishioka defeated Takahashi by 3rd round Unanimous Decision 3-0.
(Japan) Madoka Okada def. Misato Tomita (Japan)
Okada defeated Tomita by KO (knee) at 0:23 of the 2nd round
(Japan) V. Hajime def. Lim Su-Jeong (South Korea)
V. Hajime defeated Lim by 3rd round Unanimous Decision 3-0.
Girls S-Cup '09 Reserve Fight: Shoot Boxing Rules / 2Min. 2R Ext.1R
(Japan) Keiko Onuma def. Eri Nishida (Japan)
Onuma defeated Nishida by 3rd round Split Decision 2-0, 0-1
Exhibition Match - Shoot Boxing Rules / JEWELS rules 2Min. 2R
(Japan) Megumi Fujii - Hisae Watanabe (Japan)

Girls S-Cup '09 Semi-finals: Shoot Boxing Rules / 2Min. 2R Ext.1R
(Japan) RENA def. Saori Ishioka (Japan)
RENA defeated Ishioka by TKO (towel) at 0:20 of 3rd round.
(Japan) V. Hajime def. Madoka Okada (Japan)
V. Hajime defeated Okada by 3rd round Unanimous Decision 3-0.
MMA Match: JEWELS rules 57 kg / 5Min. 2R
(Japan) Shizuka Sugiyama def. Hitomi Sakamoto (Japan)
Sugiyama defeated Sakamoto by 2nd round Unanimous Decision 3-0.
Shoot Boxing Open Weight Women's Tournament Semi-final: Shoot Boxing Rules / 2Min. 2R
(Japan) HIROKO def. Super Benkei (Japan)
HIROKO defeated Super Benkei by TKO (referee stoppage) 0:57 of the 1st round.
Girls S-Cup '09 Final: Shoot Boxing Rules / 3Min. 3R Ext.2R
(Japan) RENA def. V. Hajime (Japan)
RENA defeated V. Hajime by 3rd round Unanimous Decision. 3-0

== Shoot Boxing World Tournament Girls S-Cup 2010 ==
Shoot Boxing World Tournament Girls S-Cup 2010
- Promotion: Shoot Boxing Association, JEWELS
- Date: August 29, 2010
- Venue: Crystal Palace, Grand Prince Hotel Akasaka
- City: Tokyo, Japan

Event chronology
Shoot Boxing Girls Tournament 2009	Shoot Boxing World Tournament Girls S-Cup 2010	Shoot Boxing World Tournament Girls S-Cup 2011

Shoot Boxing World Tournament Girls S-Cup 2010 was the event that featured the second of Girls S-Cup tournaments. The event was promoted by the Shoot Boxing Association and JEWELS. It was competed in the 51 kg weight class, also featuring a 54 kg opening match, one exhibition match between Nanae Takahashi and Fuka Kakimoto, and a 59 kg match. The event also featured an MMA match under co-promoter JEWELS' rules.

Two special rules children's bouts under Fuka's management were presented, one of which showcased later puroresu prodigy Haruka.

Shoot Boxing World Tournament Girls S-Cup 2010 Results
Opening Fight –54 kg: Shoot Boxing Rules / 2Min. 2R Ext.1R
(Japan) Kanako Oka def. Junko Masaki (Japan)
Oka defeated Masaki by 3rd round Unanimous Decision 3-0.
Girls S-Cup '10 Quarter-finals: Shoot Boxing Rules / 2Min. 2R Ext.1R
(Japan) RENA def. Hisae Watanabe (Japan)
RENA defeated Watanabe by KO (two knockdowns) at 1:50 of the 2nd round
(United States) Kate Martinez def. Zaza Sor. Aree (Thailand)
Martinez defeated Sor. Aree by submission (shoulder lock) at 1:12 of the 3rd round
(Japan) V. Hajime def. Samanta van Dole (Netherlands)
V. Hajime defeated Van Dole by submission (rear naked choke) at 1:45 of the 3rd round
(Japan) Ai Takahashi def. Christina Jurjevic (Australia)
Takahashi defeated Jurjevic by 3rd round Unanimous Decision 3-0.
Girls S-Cup '10 Reserve Fight: Shoot Boxing Rules / 2Min. 2R Ext.1R
(Japan) Mai Ichii def. Sumie Yamada (Japan)
Ichii defeated Yamada by 3rd round Split Decision 2-0, 1-0
Girls S-Cup '10 Semi-finals: Shoot Boxing Rules / 2Min. 2R Ext.1R
(Japan) RENA def. Kate Martinez (United States)
RENA defeated Martinez by 3rd round Unanimous Decision 3-0.
(Japan) Ai Takahashi def. V. Hajime (Japan)
Takahashi defeated V. Hajime by 3rd round Split Decision 3-0, 1-0.
Exhibition Match - Shoot Boxing Rules 2Min. 2R
(Japan) Nanae Takahashi - Fuka Kakimoto (Japan)
Shoot Boxing 59 kg: Shoot Boxing Rules / 3Min. 3R
(Japan) AZUMA def. Super Benkei (Japan)
AZUMA defeated Super Benkei by 3rd round Unanimous Decision 3-0.

MMA Match: JEWELS rules 65 kg / 5Min. 2R
(Japan) HIROKO def. Sandy Furner (Australia)
HIROKO defeated Furner by submission (forearm choke) at 1:45 of the 2nd round
Girls S-Cup '10 Final: Shoot Boxing Rules / 3Min. 3R Ext.2R
(Japan) RENA def. Ai Takahashi (Japan)
RENA defeated Takahashi by 3rd round Unanimous Decision. 3-0

== Shoot Boxing World Tournament Girls S-Cup 2011 ==
Shoot Boxing World Tournament Girls S-Cup 2011
- Promotion: Shoot Boxing Association
- Date: August 19, 2011
- Venue: Shibuya-AX
- City: Tokyo, Japan

Event chronology
Shoot Boxing World Tournament Girls S-Cup 2010	Shoot Boxing World Tournament Girls S-Cup 2011	Shoot Boxing World Tournament Girls S-Cup 2012

Shoot Boxing World Tournament Girls S-Cup 2011 was the event that featured the third of Girls S-Cup tournaments. The event was promoted by the Shoot Boxing Association. It was competed in the 51 kg weight class, also featuring a 48 kg opening match, one 70 kg and one 50 kg "Super Fight".

Former champion Rena Kubota did not participate in the tournament and instead faced Muay Thai practitioner Zaza Sor. Aree in the 50 kg "Super Fight". Former runner-up Ai Takahashi failed to participate due to an injury.

Shoot Boxing World Tournament Girls S-Cup 2011 Results
Opening Fight –48 kg: Shoot Boxing Rules / 2Min. 2R Ext.1R
(Japan) MIO def. Yoko Yamada (Japan)
MIO defeated Yamada by DQ (red card) at 1:52 of the 1st round
Girls S-Cup '11 Quarter-finals: Shoot Boxing Rules / 2Min. 3R Ext.1R
(Japan) Erika Kamimura def. Kanako Oka (Japan)
Kamimura defeated Oka by KO (two knockdowns) at 0:31 of the 2nd round
(Japan) Miyo Yoshida def. Windy Tomomi (Japan)
Yoshida defeated Tomomi by 3rd round Split Decision 2-0, 0-1
(Japan) MINA def. V.V. Mai (Japan)
MINA defeated V.V. Mai by 3rd round Split Decision 2-0, 0-1
(South Korea) Ham Seo-hee def. Emi Fujino (Japan)
Ham defeated Fujino by 3rd round Split Decision 2-0, 0-1
70 kg Super Fight: Shoot Boxing Rules / 3Min. 3R Ext.2R
(Japan) HIROKO def. Megumi Yabushita (Japan)
HIROKO defeated Yabushita by TKO (doctor stoppage) at 0:03 of the 3rd round
Girls S-Cup '11 Semi-finals: Shoot Boxing Rules / 2Min. 3R Ext.1R
(Japan) Erika Kamimura def. Miyo Yoshida (Japan)
Kamimura defeated Yoshida by KO (two knockdowns) at 0:50 of the 1st round
(South Korea) Ham Seo-hee def. MINA (Japan)
Ham defeated MINA by 3rd round Split Decision 2-0, 0-1.
50 kg Super Fight - Shoot Boxing Rules 3Min. 3R Ext.2R
(Japan) RENA def. Zaza Sor. Aree (Thailand)
RENA defeated Sor. Aree by KO (liver shot) at 2:10 of the 2nd round
Girls S-Cup '11 Final: Shoot Boxing Rules / 3Min. 3R Ext.2R
(Japan) Erika Kamimura def. Ham Seo-hee (South Korea)
Kamimura defeated Ham by 3rd round Unanimous Decision. 3-0

== Shoot Boxing World Tournament Girls S-Cup 2012 ==
Shoot Boxing World Tournament Girls S-Cup 2012
- Promotion: Shoot Boxing Association
- Date: August 25, 2012
- Venue: Yamano Hall
- City: Tokyo, Japan

Event chronology
Shoot Boxing World Tournament Girls S-Cup 2011	Shoot Boxing World Tournament Girls S-Cup 2012

Shoot Boxing World Tournament Girls S-Cup 2012 was the event that featured the fourth of Girls S-Cup tournaments. The event was promoted by the Shoot Boxing Association. It was competed in the 50 kg weight class, also featuring a bantamweight single match and two additional tournaments: 53.5 kg Girls S-Cup won by Mizuki Inoue and JKS (JoshiKouSei) 48 won by Mio Tsumura alias "Mio Kubota".
