= Lorena Klijn =

Dutch kickboxer (born 1987)

- Born: 20 September 1987 (age 39); Groningen, Netherlands
- Other names: Lady Pitbull
- Height: 1.60 m (5 ft 3 in)
- Weight: 55 kg (121 lb; 8.7 st)
- Division: Flyweight; Bantamweight
- Style: Kickboxing, Shoot boxing
- Stance: Orthodox
- Fighting out of: Haarlem, Netherlands
- Team: Gym Haarlem; Souwer Sports Institute
- Years active: 2006-present

Kickboxing record
- Total: 27
- Wins: 20
- Losses: 7
- By knockout: 0
- Draws: 0
- Last updated on: 22 March 2014

Lorena Klijn (born 20 September 1987) is a Dutch kickboxer who competes in the flyweight and bantamweight divisions.

== Career ==
Lorena Klijn rose to prominence by winning the World Professional Kickboxing League (WPKL) Women's World Flyweight Championship and garnering an unbeaten record of 17–0. She challenged for another world title on 19 March 2011, when she took on Alexis Rufus for the IKF Women's World Bantamweight (-55.45 kg/122.2 lb) Muay Thai title in London, England. The first two rounds were close but Rufus began to pull away in the third and inflicted Klijn's first defeat by unanimous decision. She then also lost by decision in her next two fights, to Jemyma Betrian at Klaar Om Te Bossen 3 in Paramaribo, Suriname on 23 December 2011 and to Ilsury Hendrikse at Haarlem Fight Night III in Haarlem, Netherlands on 26 February 2012.

Klijn made the switch to shoot boxing later that year when she was recruited to compete in the 2012 Shoot Boxing Girls S-Cup in Tokyo, Japan on 25 August 2012. In what was named as a contender for LiverKick.com's "Upset of the Year", she defeated Erika Kamimura by unanimous decision after an extension round was needed to separate the pair in their quarter-final match. Kamimura had a slight edge in the striking, but Klijn used the clinch to her advantage and was able to score a shoot point in the extension round which was the difference. She again went to an extension round in the semis with Mei Yamaguchi but came out on the losing end of a unanimous decision this time. Both fighters looked to use their clinch game to advance, but Yamaguchi proved to be superior in that department, scoring a shoot point in the second round and two shoot points in the extension round, as well as a yellow card to Klijn, which secured the lopsided extension round win.

She made her return to shoot boxing in a 53.5 kg/118 lb bout at Shootboxing 2013: Act 2 on 20 April 2013, and took a majority decision win over Miyo Yoshida. Klijn then rematch Mei Yamaguchi at Shootboxing 2013: Act 3 on 23 June 2013. She scored two shoot points in round one by executing a suplex but twisted her ankle in round two. She fought on nonetheless and continued to score with knees throughout round three and won by unanimous decision.

In a -50 kg/110 lb non-tournament bout during the 2013 Shoot Boxing Girls S-Cup Japan Midsummer Festival on 3 August 2013, Klijn lost to Rena Kubota by majority decision following an extension round. Rena managed to avoid the Dutchwoman's haymakers and attempted an arm triangle choke in round three, but Klijn also had success with throws and knees from the clinch and thus the bout was called a majority draw after the regulation three rounds. In the decisive round, Rena picked up the pace and scored throughout with punch-kick combinations to take the judges' decision.

Klijn lost to Iman Barlow by UD at -54 kg/119 lb Enfusion Live 15 in Dublin, Ireland on 22 March 2014.

== Championships and awards ==
=== Kickboxing ===
- World Professional Kickboxing League
  - WPKL Women's World Flyweight Championship

== Kickboxing record ==
Kickboxing record
20 wins 7 losses, 0 draws
Date	Result	Opponent	Event	Location	Method	Round	Time	Record
2016-02-28	Loss	(Netherlands) Orinta van der Zee	Haarlem Fight Night	Haarlem, Netherlands	Decision (Unanimous)	3	3:00	
2014-11-21	Win	(Netherlands) Mellony Geugjes	Enfusion 34	Groningen, The Netherlands	Extension round decision(unanimous)	4	3:00	21–6
2014-03-22	Loss	(England) Iman Barlow	Enfusion Live 15	Dublin, Ireland	Decision (unanimous)	3	3:00	20–6
2013-08-03	Loss	(Japan) Rena Kubota	2013 Shoot Boxing Girls S-Cup Japan Midsummer Festival	Tokyo, Japan	Extension round decision (majority)	4	3:00	20–5
2013-06-23	Win	(Japan) Mei Yamaguchi	Shootboxing 2013: Act 3	Tokyo, Japan	Decision (unanimous)	3	3:00	20–4
2013-04-20	Win	(Japan) Miyo Yoshida	Shootboxing 2013: Act 2	Tokyo, Japan	Decision (majority)	3	3:00	19–4
2012-08-25	Loss	(Japan) Mei Yamaguchi	2012 Shoot Boxing Girls S-Cup, Semi Finals	Tokyo, Japan	Decision (unanimous)	3	2:00	18–4
2012-08-25	Win	(Japan) Erika Kamimura	2012 Shoot Boxing Girls S-Cup, Quarter Finals	Tokyo, Japan	Extension round decision (unanimous)	4	2:00	18–3
2012-02-26	Loss	(Netherlands) Ilsury Hendrikse	Haarlem Fight Night III	Haarlem, Netherlands	Decision	3	3:00	17–3
2011-12-23	Loss	(Curaçao) Jemyma Betrian	Klaar Om Te Bossen 3	Paramaribo, Suriname	Decision	3	3:00	17–2
2011-03-19	Loss	(England) Alexis Rufus	Championship Muay Thai	London, England	Decision (unanimous)	5	3:00	17–1
For the IKF Women's World Bantamweight (-55.45 kg/122.2 lb) Muay Thai Championship.
2011-02-20	Win	(Netherlands) Samantha van Doorn	Haarlem Fight Night II	Haarlem, Netherlands				
2009-00-00	Win	(Spain) Ana Isabel Sordo		Spain	KO (left knee)	1	1:39	
2007-04-28	Win	(Netherlands) Linda Sijbesma	Muay Boran Gym Gala	Deventer, Netherlands	Decision	3	3:00	
Legend: Win Loss Draw/No contest Notes
