= Ai Takahashi (kickboxer) =

Japanese kickboxer

- Born: May 11, 1982 (age 44); Chiba, Chiba, Japan
- Height: 1.68 m (5 ft 6 in)
- Weight: 53.5 kg (118 lb; 8 st 6 lb)
- Division: Flyweight
- Style: Shoot boxing
- Fighting out of: Chiba, Chiba, Japan
- Team: Caesar Gym
- Years active: 2009-present

Kickboxing record
- Total: 23
- Wins: 18
- By knockout: 9
- Losses: 5

Other information
- Website: Official blog
- Last updated on: November 21, 2013

Ai Takahashi (高橋 藍, Takahashi Ai; born May 11, 1982) is a Japanese kickboxer. Takahashi competes mainly in shoot boxing, where she became the runner-up in the 2010 Shoot Boxing Girls S-Cup tournament and is a former Shoot Boxing Japan women's flyweight champion. She vacated the title on August 24, 2012.

== Background ==
Takahashi was born on May 11, 1982, in Chiba, Chiba, Japan.

== Shoot boxing and kickboxing career ==
Takahashi debuted on June 28, 2009, defeating Kanako Oka by unanimous decision in a special rules bout after an extra round at Young Caesar Cup Tokyo 2009.

In the opening round of the 2009 Shoot Boxing Girls S-Cup tournament on August 23, 2009, Takahashi was defeated by Saori Ishioka via unanimous decision after three rounds in a match that Ishioka controlled from beginning to end.

Takahashi rebounded with a victory over Harumi by TKO (referee stoppage) in the second round on November 18, 2009, at Shoot Boxing 2009: Takeshi Road -bushido- The Fifth.

Earning her second straight TKO victory, Takahashi defeated Asako Saioka on March 19, 2010, at Jewels 7th Ring. The referee stopped the fight in the second round when Takahashi was punching Saioka, who was already injured on the chin.

At Jewels 8th Ring on May 23, 2010, Takahashi defeated Yukino Oishi by unanimous decision.

On July 31, 2010, at Jewels 9th Ring, Takahashi faced and defeated Emiko Matsumoto by TKO (punches) in the third round.

On August 29, 2010, at the 2010 Shoot Boxing Girls S-Cup, Takahashi was able to defeat Australian kickboxer Christina Jurjevic in the first round and Mei Yamaguchi in the semi-finals after an extra round, both by unanimous decision. She was stopped in the final by 2009 winner Rena Kubota in a bout that went two extra rounds to determine the winner.

After the tournament, Takahashi returned to action on November 23, 2010, at the event Shoot Boxing World Tournament 2010. She faced and defeated in dominant fashion American mixed martial artist Karina Hallinan by unanimous decision after three rounds.

At Shoot Boxing 2011 act 1: SB166 on February 19, 2011, Takahashi defeated WPMF champion Zaza Sor. Aree by TKO (knees).

Takahashi next defeated Emi Fujino by TKO (corner stoppage) in the first round of their match at Shoot Boxing 2011 act 2: SB168 on April 23, 2011.

On June 5, 2011, at Shoot Boxing 2011 Act 3: SB169, Takahashi had a rematch against Rena Kubota, who was coming off of a negative result in an exhibition match against Erika Kamimura, this time for the vacant Shoot Boxing Japan women's flyweight championship. With Takahashi dominating the fight during the second half of the match, she was awarded the unanimous decision after five rounds and became the new titleholder.

Takahashi was next scheduled to face Erika Kamimura in a super fight at the 2011 Shoot Boxing Girls S-Cup. Takahashi, however, suffered an injury during training and was unable to face Kamimura on that date. She is expected to face Kamimura under RISE rules in the future.

Takahashi faced Mizuki Inoue at Shoot Boxing 2012: Road To S-Cup, Act.1 on February 5, 2012. She was defeated by unanimous decision after one extension round.

On June 3, 2012, Takahashi faced Rio Kamikaze at Shoot Boxing 2012: Road To S-Cup, Act.3. The fight was a semi-final matchup in the Shoot Boxing Girls S-Cup 53.5 kilogram tournament. Takahashi defeated Kamikaze by unanimous decision to advance to the tournament final.

Takahashi faced Mizuki Inoue once again in the 2012 Shoot Boxing Girls S-Cup 53.5 tournament final on August 25, 2012. She was defeated by unanimous decision after six rounds.

On December 2, 2012, Takahashi faced Itsuka Yokose in a kickboxing match at RISE/M-1MC: Infinity in Tokyo, Japan. Takahashi defeated Yokose by TKO (punches) in the third round.

Takahashi was scheduled to face Hyo Kyung Song at Shoot Boxing 2013: Act.1 on February 22, 2013. However, Song withdrew from the fight and Takahashi instead faced Mi-Jeon Chan. She defeated Chan by TKO in the third round.

Takahashi defeated Yuri Kim via standing guillotine choke in round one at Shoot Boxing 2013: Act.3 on June 23, 2013.

On August 3, 2013, Takahashi entered the 2013 Shoot Boxing Girls S-Cup 53.5 tournament. She defeated Wei-Ting Chen and Rio Kamikaze, but lost to Mizuki Inoue in the tournament final.

Takahashi defeated Miyo Yoshida by unanimous decision at Shoot Boxing Battle Summit: Ground Zero Tokyo 2013 on November 16, 2013.

She was scheduled to fight Miyumi Takahashi at Shootboxing 2014: Act 1 on February 23, 2014, but the fight was scrapped due to illness.

== Shoot boxing and kickboxing record ==
Ai Takahashi's shoot boxing and kickboxing record
18 wins (9 (T)KOs), 5 losses
Date	Result	Opponent	Event	Location	Method	Round	Time	Record
2013-11-16	Win	(Japan) Miyo Yoshida	Shoot Boxing Battle Summit: Ground Zero Tokyo 2013	Tokyo, Japan	Decision (Unanimous)	3	3:00	18-5
2013-08-03	Loss	(Japan) Mizuki Inoue	Shoot Boxing Girls S-Cup 2013, final	Tokyo, Japan	Decision (Unanimous)	3	2:00	17-5
2013 Shoot Boxing Girls S-Cup 53.5 tournament final.
2013-08-03	Win	(Japan) Rio Kamikaze	Shoot Boxing Girls S-Cup 2013, semi-final	Tokyo, Japan	Decision (Unanimous)	4 (Ex.1)	2:00	17-4
2013 Shoot Boxing Girls S-Cup 53.5 tournament semi-final.
2013-08-03	Win	(Taiwan) Wei-Ting Chen	Shoot Boxing Girls S-Cup 2013, quarterfinal	Tokyo, Japan	TKO (Technical submission, standing guillotine choke)	2	1:24	16-4
2013 Shoot Boxing Girls S-Cup 53.5 tournament quarterfinal.
2013-06-23	Win	(South Korea) Yuri Kim	Shoot Boxing 2013: Act 3	Tokyo, Japan	TKO (Technical submission, standing guillotine choke)	1	2:12	15-4
2013-02-22	Win	(South Korea) Mi-Jeon Chan	Shoot Boxing 2013: Act 1	Tokyo, Japan	TKO (Referee stoppage, rib injury)	3	1:41	14-4
2012-12-02	Win	(Japan) Itsuka Yokose	RISE/M-1MC: Infinity	Tokyo, Japan	TKO (Referee stoppage, punches)	3	1:30	13-4
Kickboxing rules.
2012-08-25	Loss	(Japan) Mizuki Inoue	Shoot Boxing Girls S-Cup 2012	Tokyo, Japan	Decision (Unanimous)	6 (Ex.1)	3:00	12-4
2012 Shoot Boxing Girls S-Cup 53.5 tournament final.
2012-06-03	Win	(Japan) Rio Kamikaze	Shoot Boxing 2012: Road To S-Cup, Act 3	Tokyo, Japan	Decision (Unanimous)	3	3:00	12-3
2012 Shoot Boxing Girls S-Cup 53.5 tournament semi-final.
2012-02-05	Loss	(Japan) Mizuki Inoue	Shoot Boxing 2012: Road To S-Cup, Act 1	Tokyo, Japan	Decision (Unanimous)	4 (Ex.1)	3:00	11-3
2011-06-05	Win	(Japan) Rena Kubota	Shoot Boxing 2011 Act 3: SB169	Tokyo, Japan	Decision (Unanimous)	5	3:00	11-2
Won vacant Shoot Boxing Japan women's flyweight title.
2011-04-23	Win	(Japan) Emi Fujino	Shoot Boxing 2011 Act 2: SB168	Tokyo, Japan	TKO (Corner stoppage)	1	1:17	10-2
2011-02-19	Win	(Thailand) Zaza Sor. Aree	Shoot Boxing 2011 Act 1: SB166	Tokyo, Japan	TKO (Referee stoppage, knees)	2	2:55	9-2
2010-11-23	Win	(United States) Karina Hallinan	Shoot Boxing World Tournament 2010	Tokyo, Japan	Decision (Unanimous)	3	3:00	8-2
2010-08-29	Loss	(Japan) Rena Kubota	Shoot Boxing Girls S-Cup 2010, final	Tokyo, Japan	Decision (Unanimous)	5 (Ex.2)	2:00	7-2
2010-08-29	Win	(Japan) Mei Yamaguchi	Shoot Boxing Girls S-Cup 2010, semi-final	Tokyo, Japan	Decision (Unanimous)	4 (Ex.1)	2:00	7-1
2010-08-29	Win	(Australia) Christina Jurjevic	Shoot Boxing Girls S-Cup 2010, quarterfinal	Tokyo, Japan	Decision (Unanimous)	3	2:00	6-1
2010-07-31	Win	(Japan) Emiko Matsumoto	Jewels 9th Ring	Tokyo, Japan	TKO (Referee stoppage, punches)	3	1:19	5-1
Shoot boxing rules.
2010-05-23	Win	(Japan) Yukino Oishi	Jewels 8th Ring	Tokyo, Japan	Decision (Unanimous)	3	2:00	4-1
Shoot boxing rules.
2010-03-19	Win	(Japan) Asako Saioka	Jewels 7th Ring	Tokyo, Japan	TKO (Referee stoppage, chin injury)	2	1:08	3-1
Shoot boxing rules.
2009-11-18	Win	(Japan) Harumi	Shoot Boxing 2009: Takeshi Road -bushido- The Fifth	Tokyo, Japan	TKO (Referee stoppage)	2	1:51	2-1
2009-08-23	Loss	(Japan) Saori Ishioka	Shoot Boxing Girls Tournament 2009	Tokyo, Japan	Decision (Unanimous)	3	2:00	1-1
2009-06-28	Win	(Japan) Kanako Oka	Young Caesar Cup Tokyo 2009	Tokyo, Japan	Decision (Unanimous)	4 (Ex.1)	2:00	1-0
Beginners rules.
Legend: Win Loss Draw/No contest Notes

== See also ==
- List of female kickboxers
