= Kubota (surname) =

Kubota (written: 久保田) is a Japanese surname. In Japanese, it means sunken rice paddy (窪, kubo, sink + 田, ta, rice paddy), but is usually written phonetically (久, ku, long time + 保, ho/bo, protect + 田, ta, rice paddy). Notable people with the surname include:

- Itchiku Kubota (久保田 一竹, 1917–2003), a Japanese textile artist
- Fujitaro Kubota (1879–1973), Japanese-born American gardener and philanthropist
- Kazuteru Kubota, a.k.a. Koriki Chōshū, comedian
- Kyoko Kubota (久保田 恭子; born 1933), Japanese gymnast
- Mantarō Kubota, Japanese author
- Michio Kubota (久保田 三知男; born 1949), Japanese Nordic combined skier
- Miyu Kubota (久保田 未夢; born 1995), Japanese voice actress and idol
- Rena Kubota, Japanese shootboxer
- Risa Kubota, Japanese voice actress
- Ryo Kubota (disambiguation), multiple people
- Saki Kubota (久保田早紀, born 1958), Japanese singer-songwriter
- Shigeko Kubota, visual and performance artist
- Takayuki Kubota (窪田 孝行, 1934–2024), Japanese martial artist and inventor
- Tomio Kubota (久保田 富雄, 1930–2020), Japanese mathematician
- Toshinobu Kubota, Japanese singer
- Yoshiyuki Kubota, Japanese shogi player
- Yuki Kubota (久保田 悠来; born 1981), Japanese actor and model

== Fictional characters ==
- Dr. Kubota, the main antagonist in the game Ordyne
- Shinpei Kubota, a supporting character in the manga series Gender-Swap at the Delinquent Academy
- Miko Kubota, one of the two main characters in the animated streaming television series Glitch Techs
- Boku Kubota, the player character in the video game series Boku no Natsuyasumi
