= Kubota (disambiguation) =

Kubota is a Japanese tractor and heavy equipment manufacturing company.

Kubota may also refer to:

- Kubota (surname), a Japanese surname
- Kubota Domain, a Japanese domain of the Edo period
- Kubota, Saga, a former town of Saga Prefecture
