= Mei Yamaguchi =

Japanese mixed martial artist

- Born: February 3, 1983 (age 43); Tokyo, Japan
- Other names: V.V. V Hajime
- Height: 5 ft 0 in (1.52 m)
- Weight: 114 lb (52 kg)
- Division: Strawweight (2007–2013, 2017–2022); Atomweight (2014–2016, 2023–present)
- Reach: 67.7 in (172 cm)
- Style: Karate, Shootboxing, BJJ, Wrestling
- Fighting out of: Tokyo, Japan
- Team: RIKI GYM; Wajutsu Keishukai GODS
- Rank: Black belt in karate Black belt in Brazilian jiu-jitsu
- Years active: 2007–present (MMA); 2009–2015 (Shoot boxing)

Mixed martial arts record
- Total: 38
- Wins: 21
- By knockout: 2
- By submission: 9
- By decision: 10
- Losses: 16
- By decision: 16
- Draws: 1

Other information
- University: Temple University, Japan Campus; El Camino College
- Website: Official blog
- Mixed martial arts record from Sherdog
- Last updated on: November 1, 2013

Mei Yamaguchi (山口 芽生, yamaguchi mei; born February 3, 1983), formerly known by her ring name V Hajime (V一, vī hajime), is a Japanese female mixed martial artist and kickboxer. Her former nickname comes from the V1 armlock wrestling move.

Yamaguchi currently fights as a Super Atomweight in the Rizin Fighting Federation promotion. She has a notable victory over Yuka Tsuji and was the final Valkyrie Featherweight Champion. She has also competed in Deep Jewels and ONE Championship. She is currently ranked #5 in the ONE Championship Women's Atomweight rankings.

On February 5, 2011, Yamaguchi announced that she would begin competing as a freelance fighter and changed her ring name to V.V.

== Early life ==
Yamaguchi was born in Tokyo, Japan on February 3, 1983, and grew up with a sister and a little brother. While living in Los Angeles, California, she studied some of her elementary school years before returning to Japan following her mother's unexpected death.

Yamaguchi began to learn karate during her residence in the United States around the age of 7, yearning to be like Jackie Chan. In junior high she played softball, and during college she started training in Brazilian Jiu-Jitsu. She also studied abroad in the United States during her university years: she first attended Japan Campus of Temple University before transferring to El Camino College, from where she graduated. After returning to Japan, she joined Butoku Kai. She currently serves as the leader of the Morishita branch.

In 2005, Yamaguchi entered into the Max Jiu-Jitsu Academy.

== Mixed martial arts career ==
=== Early career ===
Yamaguchi started her professional career in MMA in the lightweight tournament of Smackgirl-F 2007: The Next Cinderella Tournament 2007 First Stage on March 11, 2007, where she defeated Anna Saito by submission due to a rear naked choke.

Yamguchi won her next fight in Smackgirl, defeating Saori Ishioka with a kneebar, forcing Ishioka to tap in the second round in the semi-finals at Smackgirl-F 2007: The Next Cinderella Tournament 2007 2nd Stage on May 19, 2007.

On September 6, 2007 at Smackgirl 2007: Queens' Hottest Summer, Yamaguchi defeated Emi Tomimatsu by split decision, winning the final of the Next Cinderella Tournament 2007 in the lightweight division.

In her last fight with the promotion Smackgirl and her fourth professional match, Yamaguchi was defeated via split decision by Emi Fujino on December 26, 2007 at Smackgirl 7th Anniversary: Starting Over.

Her next bout would be at the first event for the promotion Valkyrie, Valkyrie 01, where she lost by unanimous decision against women's MMA legend Yuka Tsuji on November 8, 2008. It was just the fourth time that Tsuji had been taken to a decision.

Yamaguchi rebounded by winning her next two bouts in the inaugural Valkyrie women's featherweight tournament. The first was a unanimous decision win over Emi Fujino on April 25, 2009 at Valkyrie 02 in a rematch of their 2007 bout. The second tournament bout was against Kyoko Takabayashi, whom Yamaguchi was able to defeat with a close split decision at Cage Force & Valkyrie on July 12, 2009, winning the tournament in the process and earning the right to face Yuka Tsuji for Valkyrie's Featherweight championship.

At Valkyrie 04, in her second match against Tsuji, Yamaguchi was once again the underdog, but she managed to defeat Tsuji with a rear naked choke in only 76 seconds. This was the first time that Tsuji was defeated by a fellow Japanese fighter and only the second time that she had been defeated in her MMA career. Yamaguchi became Valkyrie's Featherweight Champion in what is considered one of the biggest upsets in the history of women's mixed martial arts.

On November 28, 2010, Yamaguchi faced Kyoko Takabayashi in a rematch of the 2009 featherweight tournament final and Yamaguchi's first defense of Valkyrie's featherweight title. Yamaguchi barely retained with a contentious majority draw in which the dissenting judge scored the fight in favor of Takabayashi at Valkyrie 08.

Yamaguchi faced "Windy" Tomomi Sunaba at Pancrase Impressive Tour 3 on April 3, 2011. She defeated Sunaba by majority decision.

Yamaguchi next faced Akiko Naito at Pancrase Impressive Tour 4 on May 3, 2011. She defeated Naito by armbar submission in the first round.

=== Jewels ===
Yamaguchi faced Seo Hee Ham in a Jewels vs. Valkyrie match at Jewels 15th Ring on July 9, 2011. She was defeated by unanimous decision.

Yamaguchi faced Mika Nagano at Jewels 17th Ring on December 17, 2011. She won the fight by split decision.

Yamaguchi fought outside Japan for the first time in her MMA career when she faced Katja Kankaanpää at Botnia Punishment 11 on March 23, 2012 in Finland. She was defeated by unanimous decision.

On July 21, 2012, Yamaguchi faced Emi Tomimatsu in a rematch at Jewels 20th Ring. She defeated Tomimatsu by unanimous decision.

Yamaguchi next faced Megumi Fujii at Vale Tudo Japan 2012 on December 24, 2012. She was defeated by unanimous decision.

On May 25, 2013, Yamaguchi faced Seo Ye Jung at Jewels 24th Ring. She defeated Jung by submission due to an armbar in the first round.

=== PXC ===
In her second fight outside Japan, Yamaguchi faced Patricia Vidonic at Pacific Xtreme Combat 40 on October 25, 2013 in Guam. She was defeated by split decision.

In her sophomore bout in PXC, Yamaguchi faced Gina Iniong at PXC 43 on March 29, 2014. She lost the bout via split decision.

=== Deep Jewels ===
After Jewels brand was merged into Deep, Yamaguchi faced Yukiko Seki at Deep Jewels 4 on May 18, 2014. She won the bout via first-round technical submission.

In her sophomore bout in the promotion, Yamaguchi faced Ayaka Hamasaki at Deep - Dream Impact 2014: Omisoka Special on December 31, 2014. She lost the bout via unanimous decision.

She was then scheduled to face Ayaka Miura at Deep Jewels 7 on February 20, 2015. However, Miura withdrew from the bout and was replaced by Miyoko Kusaka. Yamaguchi won the bout via first-minute knockout.

==== Deep Jewels Featherweight GP and championship ====
In May 2015, Yamaguchi entered into a single-day, four-woman featherweight grand prix which would crown the vacant Jewels Atomweight champion.

She claimed the title by first defeating Mina Kurobe and then Satomi Takano.

=== Return attempt to PXC ===
Yamaguchi was scheduled to face Tessa Simpson at PXC 52 on March 18, 2016. However, Yamaguchi withdrew from the bout citing an injury and was replaced by her latest opponent Satomi Takano.

=== ONE Championship and return to strawweight ===
In late March 2016, it was announced that Yamaguchi had signed with the ONE Championship, and would debut against Angela Lee for the inaugural ONE Women's Atomweight Championship at ONE Championship: Ascent to Power on May 6, 2016. She lost the bout via unanimous decision.

==== Post-title shot reign ====
In her sophomore bout in the promotion, Yamaguchi faced Istela Nunes at ONE Championship: Heroes of the World on August 13, 2016. Yamaguchi lost the bout via split decision.

==== Return to contention and title rematch ====
Yamaguchi then faced Jenny Huang at ONE Championship: Light of a Nation on June 30, 2017. She won the bout via second-round submission.

She was then scheduled to challenge Angela Lee in a rematch for the ONE Women's Atomweight Championship at ONE Championship: Immortal Pursuit on November 24, 2017. However, Lee was involved in a car accident, the bout was scrapped and Yamaguchi faced Gina Iniong instead. She won the bout via unanimous decision.

The title shot against Lee was then rebooked to take place at ONE Championship: Unstoppable Dreams on May 18, 2018. Despite knocking Lee down multiple times during the bout, Yamaguchi failed to capture the belt in her second attempt, losing via unanimous decision.

==== Winning streak ====
After the title shot loss, Yamaguchi faced Jomary Torres at ONE Championship: Destiny of Champions on December 7, 2018. She won the bout via unanimous decision.

She was then scheduled to face Bo Meng at ONE Championship: Call to Greatness on February 22, 2019. However, the bout was scrapped as Meng withdrew from the bout due to an injury.

She then faced Kseniya Lachkova at ONE Championship: A New Era on March 31, 2019. She won the bout via third-round submission.

Meng bout was then rebooked to take place at ONE Championship: Enter the Dragon on May 17, 2019. However Meng bowed out from the bout again due to an injury and was replaced by Laura Balin. Yamaguchi won the bout via first-round submission.

She then faced Jenny Huang in a rematch at ONE Championship: Century on October 13, 2019. She won the bout via unanimous decision.

==== Losing streak and departure from ONE ====
The bout with Bo Meng was rebooked for the third time to take place at ONE Championship: King of the Jungle on February 28, 2020. Meng the withdrew from the bout once again and was replaced by Denice Zamboanga. Yamaguchi lost the bout via unanimous decision.

Yamaguchi faced Julie Mezabarba as part of an alternate bout for the Atomweight World Grand-Prix at ONE Championship: Empower on September 3, 2021. She lost the bout via unanimous decision.

Yamaguchi faced Jihin Radzuan at ONE: Bad Blood on February 11, 2022, as a late notice replacement for Jenelyn Olsim. She lost the bout via unanimous decision.

=== Post ONE ===
In order to finish her career in her native Japan, she was granted an early release from ONE and subsequently signed with Rizin Fighting Federation. She dropped to super atomweight division and made her promotional debut against Kanna Asakura on April 29, 2023, at Rizin Landmark 5. She lost the bout via unanimous decision.

In her next bout, Mei faced Sayako Fujita on December 24, 2023 at Pancrase 340, losing the bout via split decision.

== Submission grappling and shoot boxing career ==
Yamaguchi tried her hand in submission grappling, first in the Abu Dhabi Combat Club Japan Trial final qualifier in the under-55 kg class, where she was defeated by points by Yasuko Mogi on April 15, 2007. In her second and final submission grappling match, she was once again defeated by points; this time by women's MMA star Miku Matsumoto at DEEP X03 on July 5, 2008.

Yamaguchi has had a more successful run in shoot boxing. She began competing on August 23, 2009, in the shoot boxing tournament Girls S-Cup 2009, where she defeated by decision South Korean female Muay thai kickboxer Su Jeong Lim and fellow mixed martial artist and karateka Madoka Okada before losing against female shoot boxing rising star Rena Kubota in the tournament final. Yamaguchi won her next two bouts by decision. She participated in the shoot boxing Girls S-Cup 2010, defeating Samanta van Dole by technical submission (standing guillotine choke) and losing against Ai Takahashi by unanimous decision after an extra round.

On August 19, 2011, Yamaguchi entered the 2011 Shoot Boxing Girls S-Cup tournament. She faced Mina in the opening round and was defeated by majority decision.

Yamaguchi entered the 2012 Shoot Boxing Girls S-Cup on August 25, 2012. She defeated Namtarn Por Munagpetch and Lorena Klijn to advance to the final round, but lost to Rena Kubota via unanimous decision in the tournament final.

Yamaguchi faced Lorena Klijn in a rematch at Shoot Boxing 2013: Act.3 on June 23, 2013. She was defeated by unanimous decision.

Yamaguchi was scheduled to compete against Du Peiling at the 2013 Shoot Boxing Girls S-Cup Japan Midsummer Festival on August 3, 2013. However, Peiling suffered an injury and Yamaguchi instead faced Chihiro Kira. She defeated Kira by unanimous decision.

Yamaguchi faced Danielle Kelly in a grappling match at ONE: X on March 26, 2022. They grappled to a draw after 12 minutes after neither could find the submission.

Yamaguchi competed in a superfight against Hakuri Ishiguro at Quintet 4 on September 10, 2023. She was submitted with a kneebar.

== Championships and accomplishments ==
=== Mixed martial arts ===
- Jewels
  - Deep Jewels Atomweight Champion (one time; former)
- Smackgirl
  - Smackgirl-F The Next Cinderella Tournament 2007 Lightweight winner
- Greatest Common Multiple
  - Valkyrie Featherweight Tournament winner
  - Valkyrie Featherweight Champion (one time; last)
- MMA Junkie
  - 2016 #4 Ranked Fight of the Year vs. Angela Lee at ONE: Ascent to Power
  - 2016 May Fight of the Month vs. Angela Lee

=== Shoot boxing ===
- 2009 Shoot Boxing Girls S-Cup runner-up
- 2012 Shoot Boxing Girls S-Cup runner-up

== Mixed martial arts record ==
Professional record breakdown
38 matches	21 wins	16 losses
By knockout	2	0
By submission	9	0
By decision	10	16
Draws	1	

Res.	Record	Opponent	Method	Event	Date	Round	Time	Location	Notes
Loss	21–16–1	Sayako Fujita	Decision (split)	Pancrase 340	December 24, 2023	3	5:00	Yokohama, Japan	
Loss	21–15–1	Kanna Asakura	Decision (unanimous)	Rizin Landmark 5	April 29, 2023	3	5:00	Tokyo, Japan	Return to Super Atomweight.
Loss	21–14–1	Jihin Radzuan	Decision (unanimous)	ONE: Bad Blood	February 11, 2022	3	5:00	Kallang, Singapore	
Loss	21–13–1	Julie Mezabarba	Decision (unanimous)	ONE: Empower	September 3, 2021	3	5:00	Kallang, Singapore	ONE Women's Atomweight World Grand Prix Alternate Bout.
Loss	21–12–1	Denice Zamboanga	Decision (unanimous)	ONE: King of the Jungle	February 28, 2020	3	5:00	Kallang, Singapore	
Win	21–11–1	Jenny Huang	Decision (unanimous)	ONE: Century Part 2	October 13, 2019	3	5:00	Tokyo, Japan	
Win	20–11–1	Laura Balin	Submission (Armbar)	ONE: Enter the Dragon	May 17, 2019	1	3:46	Kallang, Singapore	
Win	19–11–1	Kseniya Lachkova	Submission (Armbar)	ONE: A New Era	March 31, 2019	3	3:18	Tokyo, Japan	
Win	18–11–1	Jomary Torres	Decision (unanimous)	ONE: Destiny of Champions	December 7, 2018	3	5:00	Kuala Lumpur, Malaysia	Return to Strawweight.
Loss	17–11–1	Angela Lee	Decision (unanimous)	ONE: Unstoppable Dreams	May 18, 2018	5	5:00	Kallang, Singapore	For the ONE Women's Atomweight Championship (115 lb).
Win	17–10–1	Gina Iniong	Decision (unanimous)	ONE: Immortal Pursuit	November 24, 2017	3	5:00	Kallang, Singapore	
Win	16–10–1	Jenny Huang	Submission (rear-naked choke)	ONE: Light of a Nation	June 30, 2017	2	4:00	Yangon, Myanmar	
Loss	15–10–1	Istela Nunes	Decision (split)	ONE: Heroes of the World	August 13, 2016	3	5:00	Macau, China	
Loss	15–9–1	Angela Lee	Decision (unanimous)	ONE: Ascent to Power	May 6, 2016	5	5:00	Kallang, Singapore	Return to Strawweight (115 lb). For the inaugural ONE Women's Atomweight Championship (115 lb).
Win	15–8–1	Satomi Takano	TKO (punches)	Deep Jewels 8	May 31, 2015	2	4:57	Tokyo, Japan	Deep Jewels Featherweight (-48 kg) Grand Prix Final; Won the Deep Jewels Featherweight Championship.
Win	14–8–1	Mina Kurobe	Decision (unanimous)	Deep Jewels 8	May 31, 2015	2	5:00	Tokyo, Japan	Deep Jewels Featherweight (-48 kg) Grand Prix Semifinal.
Win	13–8–1	Miyoko Kusaka	KO (knee to the body)	Deep Jewels 7	February 21, 2015	1	0:44	Tokyo, Japan	Deep Jewels Featherweight (-48 kg) Grand Prix Quarterfinal.
Loss	12–8–1	Ayaka Hamasaki	Decision (unanimous)	Deep - Dream Impact 2014: Omisoka Special	December 31, 2014	2	5:00	Saitama, Japan	
Win	12–7–1	Yukiko Seki	Technical Submission (rear-naked choke)	Deep-Jewels 4	May 18, 2014	1	3:17	Tokyo, Japan	Atomweight debut.
Loss	11–7–1	Gina Iniong	Decision (split)	Pacific Xtreme Combat 43	March 29, 2014	3	5:00	National Capital Region, Philippines	
Loss	11–6–1	Patricia Vidonic	Decision (split)	Pacific Xtreme Combat 40	October 25, 2013	3	5:00	Mangilao, Guam, United States	
Win	11–5–1	Seo Ye Jung	Submission (armbar)	Jewels 24th Ring	May 25, 2013	1	1:55	Kabukicho, Tokyo, Japan	
Loss	10–5–1	Megumi Fujii	Decision (unanimous)	Vale Tudo Japan 2012	December 24, 2012	2	5:00	Shibuya, Tokyo, Japan	
Win	10–4–1	Emi Tomimatsu	Decision (unanimous)	Jewels 20th Ring	July 21, 2012	2	5:00	Koto, Tokyo, Japan	
Loss	9–4–1	Katja Kankaanpää	Decision (unanimous)	Botnia Punishment 11: Kankaanpää vs. Yamaguchi	March 23, 2012	3	5:00	Seinäjoki, Finland	
Win	9–3–1	Mika Nagano	Decision (split)	Jewels 17th Ring	December 17, 2011	2	5:00	Kabukicho, Tokyo, Japan	
Loss	8–3–1	Seo Hee Ham	Decision (unanimous)	Jewels 15th Ring	July 9, 2011	2	5:00	Kabukicho, Tokyo, Japan	
Win	8–2–1	Akiko Naito	Submission (armbar)	Pancrase: Impressive Tour 4	May 3, 2011	1	3:52	Koto, Tokyo, Japan	
Win	7–2–1	Tomomi Sunaba	Decision (majority)	Pancrase: Impressive Tour 3	April 3, 2011	2	5:00	Koto, Tokyo, Japan	
Draw	6–2–1	Kyoko Takabayashi	Draw (majority)	Valkyrie 08	November 28, 2010	3	5:00	Koto, Tokyo, Japan	Retained Valkyrie Featherweight Championship.
Win	6–2	Yuka Tsuji	Submission (rear-naked choke)	Valkyrie 04	February 11, 2010	1	1:16	Koto, Tokyo, Japan	Won Valkyrie Featherweight Championship.
Win	5–2	Kyoko Takabayashi	Decision (split)	Cage Force & Valkyrie	July 12, 2009	3	3:00	Koto, Tokyo, Japan	Valkyrie Women's Featherweight Tournament final.
Win	4–2	Emi Fujino	Decision (unanimous)	Valkyrie 02	April 25, 2009	3	3:00	Koto, Tokyo, Japan	Valkyrie Women's Featherweight Tournament semi-final
Loss	3–2	Yuka Tsuji	Decision (unanimous)	Valkyrie 01	November 8, 2008	3	3:00	Koto, Tokyo, Japan	
Loss	3–1	Emi Fujino	Decision (split)	Smackgirl 7th Anniversary: Starting Over	December 26, 2007	2	5:00	Bunkyo, Tokyo, Japan	
Win	3–0	Emi Tomimatsu	Decision (split)	Smackgirl 2007: Queens' Hottest Summer	September 6, 2007	2	5:00	Bunkyo, Tokyo, Japan	The Next Cinderella Tournament 2007 Lightweight final
Win	2–0	Saori Ishioka	Submission (kneebar)	Smackgirl-F 2007: The Next Cinderella 2007 2nd Stage	May 19, 2007	2	1:24	Bunkyo, Tokyo, Japan	The Next Cinderella Tournament 2007 Lightweight semi-finals
Win	1–0	Anna Saito	Submission (rear-naked choke)	Smackgirl-F 2007: The Next Cinderella Tournament 2007 First Stage	March 11, 2007	1	4:53	Kabukicho, Tokyo, Japan	The Next Cinderella Tournament 2007 Lightweight opening round

== Submission grappling record ==
Submission grappling record
3 Fights, 0 Wins, 2 Losses, 1 Draws
Date	Result	Opponent	Event	Location	Method	Round	Time	Record	Notes
March 26, 2022	Draw	(United States) Danielle Kelly	ONE: X	Kallang, Singapore	Decision	1	12:00	0-2-1	
July 5, 2008	Loss	(Japan) Miku Matsumoto	DEEP X03	Tokyo, Japan	Points (4-10)	2	4:00	0-2-0	
April 15, 2007	Loss	(Japan) Yasuko Mogi	Abu Dhabi Combat Club Japan Trial final qualifier	Tokyo, Japan	Points (2-6)	N/A	N/A	0-1-0	Women under-55 kg class - 1st round
Legend: Win Loss Draw/No contest

== Shoot boxing record ==
Mei Yamaguchi shoot boxing record
9 Wins, 6 Losses
Date	Result	Opponent	Event	Location	Method	Round	Time	Record
2015-08-21	Loss	(Japan) MIO	Shoot Boxing Girls S-Cup 2015 Japan Tournament, Semi Final	Tokyo, Japan	Ext.R Decision (Unanimous)	4	3:00	9-6-0
2015-08-21	Win	(Japan) Michi	Shoot Boxing Girls S-Cup 2015 Japan Tournament, Quarter Final	Tokyo, Japan	Decision (Unanimous)	4	3:00	9-5-0
2013-08-03	Win	(Japan) Chihiro Kira	Shoot Boxing Girls S-Cup 2013	Tokyo, Japan	Decision (unanimous)	3	3:00	8-5-0
2013-06-23	Loss	(Netherlands) Lorena Klijn	Shoot Boxing 2013: Act.3	Tokyo, Japan	Decision (unanimous)	3	3:00	7-5-0
2012-08-25	Loss	(Japan) Rena Kubota	Shoot Boxing Girls S-Cup 2012, final	Tokyo, Japan	Decision (unanimous)	3	2:00	7-4-0
2012-08-25	Win	(Netherlands) Lorena Klijn	Shoot Boxing Girls S-Cup 2012, semi-finals	Tokyo, Japan	Decision (unanimous)	4 (Ex.1)	2:00	7-3-0
Klijn was penalized one point for an illegal kick in round four.
2012-08-25	Win	(Thailand) Namtarn Por Munagpetch	Shoot Boxing Girls S-Cup 2012, first round	Tokyo, Japan	Decision (unanimous)	4 (Ex.1)	2:00	6-3-0
2011-08-19	Loss	(Japan) Mina	Shoot Boxing Girls S-Cup 2011, first round	Tokyo, Japan	Decision (majority)	3	2:00	5-3-0
2010-08-29	Loss	(Japan) Ai Takahashi	Shoot Boxing Girls S-Cup 2010, semi-finals	Tokyo, Japan	Decision (unanimous)	4 (Ex.1)	2:00	5-2-0
2010-08-29	Win	(Netherlands) Samanta van Dole	Shoot Boxing Girls S-Cup 2010, first round	Tokyo, Japan	TKO (Technical submission, standing guillotine choke)	3	1:45	5-1-0
Van Dole was penalized one point for not making the contracted weight.
2010-06-06	Win	(Japan) Ikue Tanimura	Shoot Boxing 25th anniversary series	Tokyo, Japan	Decision (unanimous)	3	2:00	4-1-0
2009-11-18	Win	(Japan) Etsu Senchaigym	Shoot Boxing 2009: Bushido	Tokyo, Japan	Decision (unanimous)	4 (Ex.1)	2:00	3-1-0
2009-08-23	Loss	(Japan) Rena Kubota	Shoot Boxing Girls Tournament 2009 final	Tokyo, Japan	Decision (unanimous)	3	2:00	2-1-0
2009-08-23	Win	(Japan) Madoka Okada	Shoot Boxing Girls Tournament 2009 semi-finals	Tokyo, Japan	Decision (unanimous)	3	2:00	2-0-0
2009-08-23	Win	(South Korea) Su Jeong Lim	Shoot Boxing Girls Tournament 2009 first round	Tokyo, Japan	Decision (unanimous)	3	2:00	1-0-0
Legend: Win Loss Draw/No contest Notes

== See also ==
- List of current ONE fighters
- List of female mixed martial artists
- List of female kickboxers
