= Jleana Valentino =

Italian kickboxer

- Born: 3 May 1988 (age 38); Somma Lombardo, Italy
- Nickname: "Nikita"
- Nationality: Italian
- Height: 1.64 m (5 ft 5 in)
- Weight: 52 kg (115 lb; 8 st 3 lb)
- Division: Flyweight
- Style: Kickboxing
- Fighting out of: Novara, Italy
- Trainer: Angelo Valente
- Years active: 2015 - present

Kickboxing record
- Total: 59
- Wins: 52
- By knockout: 7
- Losses: 6
- By knockout: 3
- Draws: 1

Mixed martial arts record
- Total: 5
- Wins: 2
- By decision: 2
- Losses: 3
- By submission: 2
- By decision: 1

Jleana Valentino (born 3 May 1988) is an Italian kickboxer and mixed martial artist. She is the current world champions of Shoot boxing, and European champion of Muay Thai.

== Biography ==
On 10 November 2020 she participated in the Italian program of RAI Giovani e famosi (Young and famous).

== Titles and accomplishments ==
- World Association of Kickboxing Organizations
  - 2014 WAKO-Pro Italy K-1 -52 kg Champion
- World Fighters Corporation
  - 2015 WFC European -52 kg Champion
- Oktagon
  - 2016 Oktagon 55 kg Champion
- World Boxing Council Muaythai
  - 2018 WBC Muaythai European Flyweight (-50 kg) Champion
- Shoot Boxing
  - 2018 Shoot Boxing Girls S-Cup Flyweight Tournament Winner

== Fight record ==
Professional Kickboxing Record
53 Wins (8(T)KO's), 7 Losses, 1 Draw, 0 No Contest
Date	Result	Opponent	Event	Location	Method	Round	Time
2021-06-19	Loss	(Spain) Cristina Morales		Marbella, Spain	Decision (Unanimous)	5	3:00
For the vacant IPCC Intercontinental 52kg title.
2020-01-25	Win	(France) Juliette Lacroix	YOKKAO 45	Turin, Italy	TKO (Doctor stoppage)	3	0:53
2019-12-14	Win	(Spain) Anta Sanchez	The Night of Kick and Punch 10	Milan, Italy	Decision	3	3:00
2019-04-29	Loss	(Japan) Manazo Kobayashi	KNOCK OUT 2019 SPRING	Tokyo, Japan	Decision (Unanimous)	3	3:00
2018-07-06	Win	(Japan) MIO	Shoot Boxing Girls S-Cup, Tournament Finals	Tokyo, Japan	Decision (Unanimous)	3	3:00
Wins the 2018 Shootboxing Girls Flyweight S-Cup.
2018-07-06	Win	(Japan) MISAKI	Shoot Boxing Girls S-Cup, Tournament Semifinals	Tokyo, Japan	Decision (Unanimous)	3	3:00
2018-07-06	Win	(Japan) Manazo Kobayashi	Shoot Boxing Girls S-Cup, Tournament Quarterfinals	Tokyo, Japan	Decision (Majority)	3	3:00
2018-03-03	Loss	(United Kingdom) Iman Barlow	A Night Of Muay Thai V	Melton Mowbray, England	Decision (unanimous)	3	3:00
2018-01-20	Win	(Switzerland) Aline Seiberth	The Night of Kick and Punch	Milan, Italy	Decision (Majority)	5	3:00
Wins the WBC Muaythai European Flyweight title.
2017-07-07	Loss	(Japan) Rena Kubota	Shoot Boxing Girls S-Cup	Tokyo, Japan	Decision (Unanimous)	3	3:00
2017-06-24	Win	(France) Cindy Silvestre	The Night of Kick and Punch 7	Milan, Italy	Decision	3	3:00
2016-05-14	Win	(Italy) Gloria Peritore	La Notte dei Campioni	Lombardy, Italy	Decision (Split)	5	3:00
Wins the Oktagon 55kg title.
2016-02-13	Win	(Italy) Aicha Amarhoun	Petrosyan Mania	Milan, Italy	Decision (Unanimous)	5	3:00
2015-06-20	Win	(Netherlands) Mellony Geugjes		Belgium	Decision (Unanimous)	5	3:00
Wins the WFC European -52kg title.
2014-06-28	Win	(Italy) Silvia La Notte	360° Fight Night	Taranto, Italy	Decision (Unanimous)	3	3:00
Wins the WAKO-Pro Italy K-1 -52kg title.
2014-05-	Win	(Germany) Eike Beinwachs		Munich, Germany	KO (Knee)	3	
2014-03-01	Win	(Greece) Emy Kougioumtzoglou	WAKO Pro Elite Tournament, Semi Final	Milan, Italy	Decision (Unanimous)	3	3:00
2013-12-15	Win	(Italy) Luana Lorenzoni	King of the Ring	Rimini, Italy	Decision (Unanimous)	3	3:00
Legend: Win Loss Draw/No contest Notes

Amateur Kickboxing Record
Date	Result	Opponent	Event	Location	Method	Round	Time
2013-09-30	Loss	(Serbia) Sanja Sucevic	2013 WAKO World Championships, Quarter Final	Brazil	Decision	3	2:00
Legend: Win Loss Draw/No contest Notes

== Mixed martial arts record ==
Professional record breakdown
5 matches	2 wins	3 losses
By submission	0	2
By decision	2	1

Res.	Record	Opponent	Method	Event	Date	Round	Time	Location	Notes
Loss	2–3	Hanna Palmquist	Submission (rear-naked choke)	WOW 21	August 9, 2025	3	3:20	Marbella, Spain	
Win	2–2	Nadine Abbott-Bissett	Decision (unanimous)	Cage Conflict 15	March 8, 2025	3	5:00	Belfast, Northern Ireland	Catchweight (110 lb) bout.
Loss	1–2	Fabiola Nascimento	Decision (unanimous)	Brave CF 80	December 15, 2023	3	5:00	Isa Town, Bahrain	
Win	1–1	Adelasia Chilleri	Decision (unanimous)	Centurion Fight: Ad Maiora	November 16, 2022	3	5:00	La Valletta, Malta	Strawweight debut.
Loss	0–1	Rena Kubota	Submission (flying armbar)	Rizin World Grand Prix 2015: Part 2 - Iza	December 31, 2015	2	3:31	Saitama, Japan	Catchweight (113 lb) bout.

== See also ==
- List of female kickboxers
