= Ryo Hirai =

Japanese baseball player (born 1991)

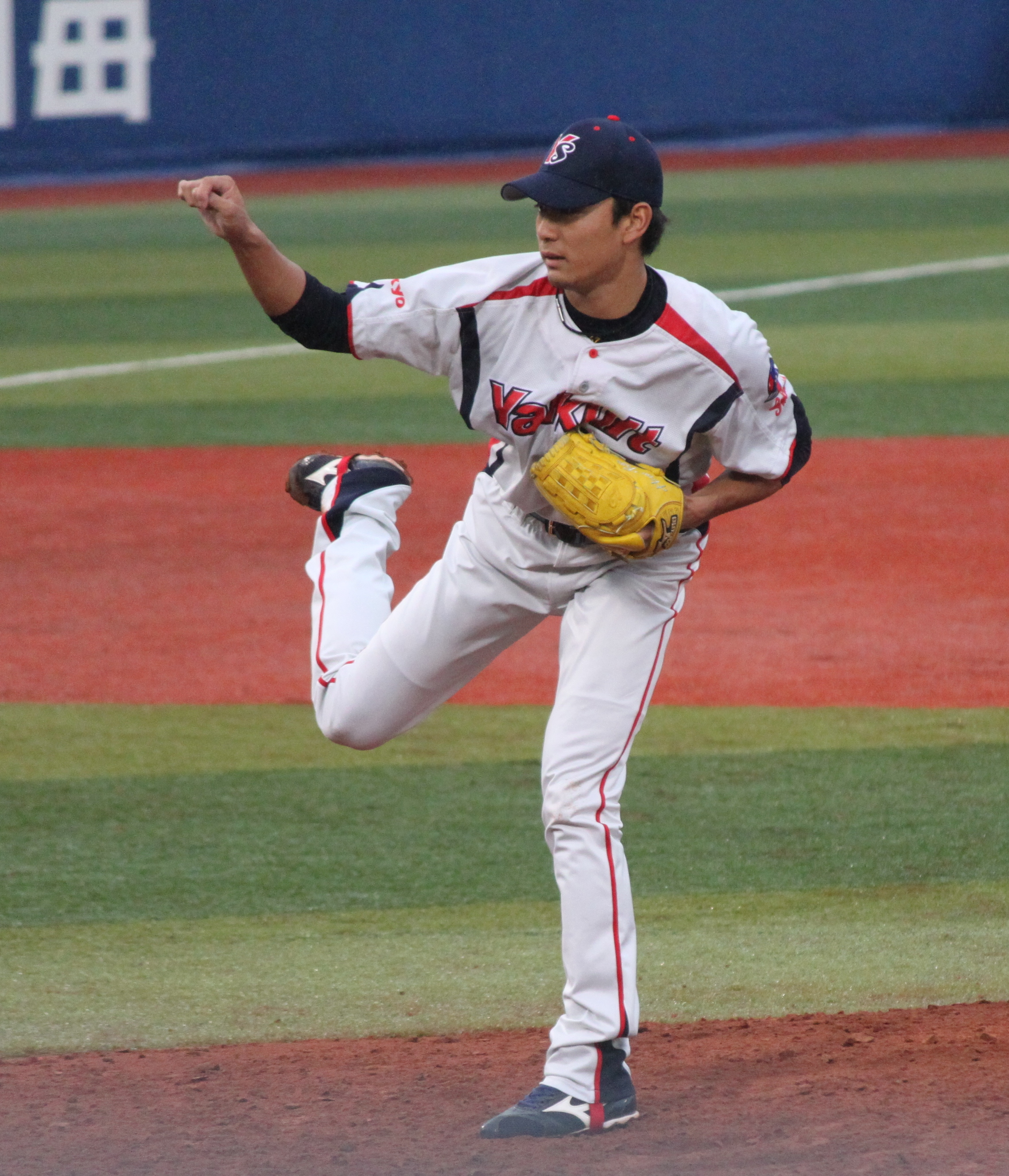

Free agent
- Pitcher
- Born: April 23, 1991 (age 34); Kokawa, Wakayama, Japan
- Bats: Right Throws: Right

NPB debut
- April 5, 2012, for the Tokyo Yakult Swallows

NPB statistics (through 2020 season)
- Win–loss record: 5–5
- ERA: 5.01
- Strikeouts: 58
- Stats at Baseball Reference

Teams
- Tokyo Yakult Swallows (2010–2020)

Ryo Hirai (平井 諒, Hirai Ryō; born April 23, 1991) is a Japanese professional baseball pitcher who is a free agent. He has previously played in Nippon Professional Baseball (NPB) for the Tokyo Yakult Swallows.

== Career ==
On December 2, 2020, Hirai became a free agent.
