= Ryo Watanabe (footballer, born September 1996) =

Japanese footballer

Personal information
- Date of birth: 24 September 1996 (age 30)
- Place of birth: Chiba, Japan
- Height: 1.69 m (5 ft 7 in)
- Position: Midfielder

Team information
- Current team: Vanraure Hachinohe
- Number: 22

Youth career
- JSC Chiba
- –2014: FC Tokyo
- 2015–2018: Nippon Sport Science University

Senior career*
Years	Team	Apps	(Gls)
2019–2022	Tegevajaro Miyazaki	54	(10)
2022–	Vanraure Hachinohe	34	(1)
- * Club domestic league appearances and goals as of 08:57, 24 July 2023 (UTC)

Ryo Watanabe (渡邊 龍, Watanabe Ryo; born 24 September 1996) is a Japanese professional footballer who plays as a midfielder for Vanraure Hachinohe.

== Career statistics ==
=== Club ===
As of 20 March 2021.

Club	Season	League			National Cup		League Cup		Other		Total	
Club	Season	Division	Apps	Goals	Apps	Goals	Apps	Goals	Apps	Goals	Apps	Goals
Tegevajaro Miyazaki	2019	JFL	12	0	0	0	–		0	0	12	0
Tegevajaro Miyazaki	2020	JFL	14	5	1 (Note: Appearances in the Emperor's Cup)	0	–		0	0	15	5
Tegevajaro Miyazaki	2021	J3 League	1	0	0	0	–		0	0	1	0
Career total			27	5	1	0	0	0	0	0	28	5
