= Shoot boxing =

Combat sport and a stand-up fighting promotion company based in Tokyo, Japan

Shoot boxing シュートボクシング
- Also known as: Standing Vale Tudo, Shootboxing
- Focus: Hybrid
- Country of origin: Japan
- Creator: Caesar Takeshi
- Famous practitioners: Andy Souwer, Kenichi Ogata, Hiroki Shishido, Rena Kubota, Ai Takahashi, Mitsuya Nagai
- Parenthood: Boxing, Kickboxing, Muay Thai, Judo, Jujutsu, Shoot Wrestling
- Olympic sport: No
- Official website: shootboxing.org

Shoot boxing
- Highest governing body: International Shoot Boxe Federation

Characteristics
- Contact: Yes
- Type: Martial art

Presence
- Country or region: Japan
- Olympic: No

Shoot boxing (シュートボクシング, Shūtobokushingu), commonly written as Shootboxing, is a combat sport.

Shoot boxing is also a stand-up fighting promotion company based in Tokyo, Japan. The organization was founded by former kickboxer Caesar Takeshi in 1985.

Shootboxing, the combat sport, is a mixture of its two parent combat styles of shoot wrestling and kickboxing, allowing for kicks, punches, knees, elbows, throws, and standing submissions (chokeholds, armlocks and wristlocks).

== History ==
Shoot boxing was created in August 1985 by former kickboxer Caesar Takeshi. The first Shootboxing event took place on September 1, 1985.

Some mixed martial artists such as Hayato Sakurai began their careers in Shootboxing. Shootboxing has also drawn fighters who became famous in other promotions such as Jens Pulver. Many K-1 World MAX stars also either debuted in Shootboxing or have fought for Shootboxing in the past, including Andy Souwer, Albert Kraus, and Buakaw Banchamek.

== Rules ==
Shootboxing rules are as follows:

=== Match form ===
Professional shoot boxing matches fall into one of two classes, Expert class and Freshman class. The length of an Expert class match is five rounds of three minutes each, followed by one or two extra rounds of three minutes each in the event of a tie. The interval between rounds is one minute.

The length of a Freshman class match is three rounds of three minutes each, followed by one or two three-minute rounds in the event of a tie. The interval between rounds is also one minute.

=== Weight classes ===
Professional shoot boxers are divided into weight classes as follows:

Old weight division (until 2001)
13 classes (+1 women's class)

Name	Upper weight limit
Men
Eagleweight	Unlimited
Junior Eagleweight	80 kg (176.4 lb)
Hawkweight	75 kg (165.3 lb)
Junior Hawkweight	72.5 kg (159.8 lb)
Falconweight	70 kg (154.3 lb)
Junior Falconweight	67.5 kg (148.8 lb)
Seagullweight	65 kg (143.3 lb)
Junior Seagullweight	62.5 kg (137.8 lb)
Cardinalweight	60 kg (132.3 lb)
Junior Cardinalweight	57.5 kg (126.8 lb)
Owlweight	55 kg (121.3 lb)
Junior Owlweight	52.5 kg (115.7 lb)
Sparrowweight	50 kg (110.2 lb)
Women
Ladybugweight	52 kg (114.6 lb)

Current weight division
15 classes (+6 women's classes)

Name	Upper weight limit
Men
Super heavyweight	Unlimited
Heavyweight	90 kg (198.4 lb)
Light heavyweight	80 kg (176.4 lb)
Super middleweight	75 kg (165.3 lb)
Middleweight	72.5 kg (159.8 lb)
Super welterweight	70 kg (154.3 lb)
Welterweight	67.5 kg (148.8 lb)
Super lightweight	65 kg (143.3 lb)
Lightweight	62.5 kg (137.8 lb)
Super featherweight	60 kg (132.3 lb)
Featherweight	57.5 kg (126.8 lb)
Super bantamweight	55 kg (121.3 lb)
Bantamweight	52.5 kg (115.7 lb)
Super flyweight	50 kg (110.2 lb)
Flyweight	47.5 kg (104.7 lb)
Women
Lightweight	65 kg (143.3 lb)
Featherweight	60 kg (132.3 lb)
Bantamweight	55 kg (121.3 lb)
Flyweight	52 kg (114.6 lb)
Strawweight	49 kg (108.0 lb)
Atomweight	46 kg (101.4 lb)

Sparrowweight was divided into Flyweight and Super flyweight, and Eagleweight was divided into Heavyweight and Super heavyweight since 2001.

=== Match judgment ===
One way to win a shoot boxing match is to knock one's opponent out. A fighter can be knocked out in different ways. If, after being knocked down, a fighter fails to stand up after a count of ten, or if, after standing up, he fails to assume a fighting stance after a count of eight, he is knocked out. The same occurs if a fighter is knocked out of the ring and fails to return before a count of twenty. A referee may also rule a fighter knocked out if the fighter shows no fighting spirit, appears unable to defend his or her self, or makes a gesture of submission.

Technical knockouts can also occur in shoot boxing, in cases where the fighter is injured, the referee rules the fighter knocked out after two knockdowns in the same round, or the fighter's corner throws in the towel. A fight may also be stopped if a doctor rules that continuation would be dangerous to a fighter.

If neither a knockout nor a technical knockout occurs, the winner is determined by a decision. Fighters are graded on their effectiveness on attack and defense, their success in achieving and escaping submissions, and how close they have come to ending the match. Decisions generally produce a winner, but can result in a draw.

A judgement of "no contest" may also be returned, if the judges suspect foul play or conclude that the fighters are not fighting sincerely.

=== Match scoring ===
Fighters are awarded points for their success in striking, throwing, and applying standing submission holds to their opponent. They are also given points for four categories of performance: number of times down, amount of damage done to opponent, number of clean hits, and aggressiveness. Fighters are graded from 1–10 in each category, with the difference of score in any one category being limited to 4 points.

Extra points can be awarded at certain points in the match, when the referee makes certain calls. When a fighter performs a front or back throwing technique, the referee calls "shoot", denoting one of these opportunities. The other occurs when a fighter achieves a standing submission; at this point, the referee calls "catch".

=== Fouls ===
Foul play is recognized as the following ① to ⑬. After a warning, the fighter will receive a point deduction for further infractions. If the same fighter commits another foul, another point is deducted, and a final warning is given. If a third warning is given to the same fighter, he is disqualified and loses the fight. If the referee feels that it was not a flagrant foul, he may allow the fight to continue.

- 1: Headbutting the opponent.
- 2: Striking the opponent in the groin.
- 3: Biting the opponent.
- 4: Attacking the opponent while he is falling, or when he is getting up.
- 5: Attacking an opponent after the referee signals for a break.
- 6: Utilizing the ropes to aid one's offense or defense.
- 7: To insult or use offensive speech and actions towards an opponent or the referee.
- 8: Striking the opponent in the back of the head.
- 9: The act of intentionally grounding a glove or knee to the mat to defend an attack.
- 10: Intentionally causing the opponent to fall out of the ring.
- 11: Intentionally leaving the ring.
- 12: It makes everything of the act of not being admitted by the other rule foul play.
  - a) If a fighter ever accuses the judges of not being impartial, points are to be immediately deducted.
  - b) The act of ducking the head low and diving into the opponent in such a manner that appears similar to a headbutt.

When either fighter receives a cut from a headbutt, the fighter that made the cut receives a point deduction, even if the headbutt was accidental. If the referee decides that the headbutt was intentional, the fighter receives a two-point deduction.

  - c) Repeated holding which does not appear to be an attack, nor an attempt to escape attacks, will be subject to point deductions after warnings from the referee.

"An attempt to escape attacks" is defined as the act whose intent is to interrupt the opponent's offense or defense by grappling immediately after an attack.

A fighter will be disqualified in the case of any of the following situations:

- 1: When there is intentional foul play, and the referee declares a disqualification for the action.
- 2: When the fighter does not obey the referee.
- 3: If a fighter cannot continue when the round begins.
- 4: When a fighter's attitude is overly rough or violent, with the intent to cause bodily harm above and beyond what is considered to be necessary to compete.
- 5: When the referee decides a fighter lacks fighting spirit, or the desire to continue.
- 6: When a fighter receives three point deductions in one round.
- 7: When a doctor declares a fighter unfit to continue the match.
- 8: When violating fight regulations.

== Championship history ==
=== S-Cup World Champions ===
==== Male S-Cup World Champions ====
S-Cup, the Shoot Boxing World Cup, is the eigh t-man single elimination World Tournament. It has generally been held once every two years since 1995.

Year	Champion	Runner-up
2025	(Japan) Haruto Yasumoto	(Japan) Kotaro Yamada
2018	(Japan) Kaito	(Japan) UMA
2016	(Netherlands) Zakaria Zouggary	(Japan) Masaya
2014	(Japan) Hiroaki Suzuki	(Netherlands) Zakaria Zouggary
2012	(Netherlands) Andy Souwer	(Netherlands) Henri van Opstal
2010	(Thailand) Buakaw Por. Pramuk	(United States) Toby Imada
2008	(Netherlands) Andy Souwer	(Japan) Kenichi Ogata
2006	(Japan) Kenichi Ogata	(Netherlands) Andy Souwer
2004	(Netherlands) Andy Souwer	(Japan) Hiroki Shishido
2002	(Netherlands) Andy Souwer	(China) Zheng Yuhao
1997	(Suriname) Rayen Simson	(Belgium) Mohamed Ouali
1995	(Japan) Hiromu Yoshitaka	(United States) Ron Belliveau

=== Girls S-Cup World Champions ===
Girls S-Cup is the eight-woman, single elimination World Tournament. Since 2009, it has generally been held once a year..

Year	Champion	Runner-up
2018	(Italy) Jleana Valentino	(Japan) MIO
2017	(Japan) Rena Kubota	(Italy) Jleana Valentino
2016	(Japan) Rena Kubota	(Poland) Klaudia Pawicka
2015	(Japan) MIO	(Japan) Momi Furuta
2014	(Japan) Rena Kubota	(Thailand) Thicha Rongrien Kila Korat
2013	(Japan) Mizuki Inoue	(Japan) Ai Takahashi
2012	(Japan) Rena Kubota	(Japan) Mei Yamaguchi
2011	(Japan) Erika Kamimura	(South Korea) Seo Hee Ham
2010	(Japan) Rena Kubota	(Japan) Ai Takahashi
2009	(Japan) Rena Kubota	(Japan) Mei Yamaguchi

=== Shoot Boxing Japan champions ===
==== Men Shoot Boxing Japan champions ====
===== Heavyweight championship (formerly Super Eagleweight) =====
Weight limit: 90kg

No.	Name	Date	Defenses
1	(Japan) Kengo Shimizu (def. Nangoku Chojin)	December 1, 2015	

===== Light Heavyweight championship (formerly Eagleweight) =====
Weight limit: 80kg

No.	Name	Date	Defenses
1	(Japan) Keisuke Tsuyama (def. )		
2	(Japan) Go Takano (def. )		
3	(Japan) Kazuya Mori (def. )		

===== Super Middleweight championship (formerly Hawkweight) =====
Weight limit: 75kg

No.	Name	Date	Defenses
1	(Japan) Takeshi Caesar (def. Riki Tadakatsu)	July 12, 1987	
2	(Japan) Hiromu Yoshitaka (def. Naoyuki Taira)	August 26, 1990	

===== Middleweight championship (formerly Junior Hawkweight) =====
Weight limit: 72.5kg

No.	Name	Date	Defenses
1	(Japan) Toshiaki Tanaka (def. )		
2	(Japan) Takashi Abe (def. Toshiaki Tanaka)	1993	
3	(Japan) Ryuji Goto (def. Shonan Kiarimi)	February 2, 2003	

===== Super Welterweight championship (formerly Falconweight) =====
Weight limit: 70kg

No.	Name	Date	Defenses
1	(Japan) Kenichi Ogata (def. Seiichiro Nishibayashi)	June 4, 1998	
Ogata vacated the title on November 30, 2007.
2	(Japan) Kenji Kanai (def. Koichi Kikuchi)	February 3, 2008	def. Takashi Ohno on July 21, 2008.
3	(Japan) Takaaki Umeno (def. Kenji Kanai)	June 1, 2009	
4	(Japan) Satoru Suzuki (def. Kenji Kanai)	September 10, 2011	
5	(Japan) Yuki Sakamoto (def. Satoru Suzuki)	April 20, 2013	
6	(Japan) Kentaro Hokuto (def. Yuki Sakamoto)	February 11, 2017	
6	(Japan) Kosuke Takagi (def. Ryotaro)	February 8, 2025	def. Daiki Kazama on June 21, 2026.

===== Welterweight championship (formerly Junior Falconweight) =====
Weight limit: 67.5kg

No.	Name	Date	Defenses
1	(Japan) Hiroki Shishido (def. Koichi Kikuchi)	June 6, 2005	def. Hitoshi Yamaguchi on July 21, 2008.
Shishido vacated the title on April 3, 2009.
2	(Japan) Takahiro Okuyama (def. Yoshimitsu Murata)	June 26, 2022	

===== Super Lightweight championship (formerly Seagullweight) =====
Weight limit: 65kg

No.	Name	Date	Defenses
1	(Japan) Masahiro Hada (def. )		
2	(Japan) Li Sogi (def. Takashi Abe)	1992	
3	(Japan) Takashi Abe (def. Li Sogi)	December 9, 1992	
4	(Japan) Hidekazu Miyake (def. )		
5	(Japan) Katsuo Ise (def. )		
6	(Japan) Kenjiro Tatsumi (def. Katsuo Ise)		
7	(Japan) Hiroyuki Doi (def. Kenjiro Tatsumi)	October, 1997	def. Atsuhiro Tsuboi on May 21, 2000.
Doi vacated the title in 2000.
8	(Japan) Hiroki Shishido (def. Ki Sakaguchi)	September 25, 2001	def. Masaaki Kato on June 1, 2003.
Shishido vacated the title on February 1, 2005.
9	(Japan) MASAYA (def. Rudo)	September 23, 2013	
MASAYA vacated the title on May 1, 2014.
10	(Japan) Hiroaki Suzuki (def. Shinsuke Hirai)	September 20, 2014	
Suzuki vacated the title on August 21, 2015.
11	(Japan) MASAYA (def. Takahiro Okuyama)	September 19, 2016	
MASAYA vacated the title on March 1, 2017.
12	(Japan) Kaito (def. Kenta)	November 22, 2017	
Kaito vacated the title on November 21, 2021.
13	(Japan) Imoto Volcano (def. Kiyoaki Murata)	December 26, 2021	def. Hiroki Kasahara on August 9, 2025.
14	(Japan) Hiroki Kasahara (def. Imoto Volcano)	June 21, 2026	

===== Lightweight championship (formerly Junior Seagullweight) =====
Weight limit: 62.5kg

No.	Name	Date	Defenses
1	(Japan) Hiroaki Suzuki (def. Yuuji Sagawara)	February 2, 2012	
Suzuki vacated the title on September 20, 2014.
2	(Japan) Renta Nishioka (def. Kiyoaki Murata)	September 15, 2018	
3	(Japan) Hiroki Kasahara (def. Renta Nishioka)	April 10, 2022	
Kasahara vacated the title in 2024.

===== Super Featherweight championship (formerly Cardinalweight) =====
Weight limit: 60kg

No.	Name	Date	Defenses
1	(Japan) Katsumi Omura (def. Toshio Kurosawa)	March 21, 1987	
2	(Japan) Kyoichi Otsu (def. Katsumi Omura)	July 12, 1987	def. Nobukazu Katori on January 31, 1988
3	(Japan) Makoto Oe (def. Kyoichi Otsu)	May 21, 1988	
Oe vacated the title in 1990.
4	(Japan) Nobukazu Katori (def. )	1991	
5	(Japan) Kazuki Wakamiya (def. Nobukazu Katori)	October 5, 1991	def. Ryuji Ooike on April 17, 1992
Wakamiya vacated the title in 1992.
6	(Japan) Masahiro Okamoto (def. )	November 22, 1992	def. Seichiro Nishibayashi on January 23, 1994.
7	(Japan) Takehiro Murahama (def. Masahiro Okamoto)	November 22, 1994	def. Kazuki Wakamiya on June 4, 1998.
Murahama vacated the title in 1999.
8	(Japan) Tatsuya Maeda (def. Takato Kitaoka)	April 7, 2000	
9	(Japan) Tomohiro Oikawa (def. Tatsuya Maeda)	September 22, 2002	
10	(Japan) Tomoki Matsuura (def. Tomohiro Oikawa)	July 4, 2003	
11	(Japan) Tomohiro Oikawa (def. Tomoki Matsuura)	June 4, 2004	def. Takeshi Ishikawa on April 4, 2008.; def. Hiroaki Suzuki on September 4, 2009.
Oikawa vacated the title in 2011.
12	(Japan) Akifumi Utagawa (def. Koji Ikegami)	June 3, 2012	def. Naguranchun Masa M-16 on June 21, 2014.
Utagawa vacated the title on June 21, 2014.
13	(Japan) Kiyoaki Murata (def. Koji Ikegami)	September 16, 2017	
Murata vacated the title on August 2, 2018.
14	(Japan) Kazuki Fukada (def. Kazuya Ueda)	September 15, 2018	
15	(Japan) Hiroki Kasahara (def. Kazuki Fukada)	September 28, 2019	
Kasahara vacated the title on November 21, 2021.
16	(Japan) Yuki Kasahara (def. Shota Tezuka)	December 26, 2021	

===== Featherweight championship (formerly Junior Cardinalweight) =====
Weight limit: 57.5kg

No.	Name	Date	Defenses
1	(Japan) Naguranchun Masa M-16 (def. Akito Sagimura)	September 10, 2011	
Naguranchun vacated the title on April 4, 2013.
2	(Japan) Koya Shimada (def. Motohiro Shinohara)	April 18, 2014	
Shimada vacated the title immediately after winning it on April 18, 2014.
3	(Japan) Kazuki Fukada (def. Genki)	August 13, 2016	def. Taiki Naito on June 16, 2017
Fukada vacated the title on August 2, 2018.
4	(Japan) Hiroki Kasahara (def. Genki)	September 15, 2018	
5	(Japan) Yuki Kasahara (def. Shota Tezuka)	September 19, 2020	
Kasahara vacated the title on November 21, 2021.
6	(Japan) Kyo Kawakami (def. Kaito)	April 10, 2022	
7	(Japan) Kotaro Yamada (def. Kyo Kawakami)	April 30, 2023	def. Kyo Kawakami on April 12, 2025

===== Super Bantamweight championship (formerly Owlweight) =====
Weight limit: 55kg

No.	Name	Date	Defenses
1	(Japan) Nobukazu Katori (def. Katsushi Sanada)	July 9, 1988	
2	(Japan) Yoshikazu Katori (def. )	July 9, 1988	
3	(Japan) Ryuji Ooike (def. )		
4	(Japan) Shigeyuki Wakabayashi (def. )		
5	(Japan) Yoshichika Suzuki (def. )		
6	(Japan) Yoshihiro Moriya (def. Atsushi Miyaji)	April 15, 2001	def. Takafumi Ichimasa on September 22, 2002.
Moriya vacated the title on September 23, 2006, when he retired.
7	(Japan) Phantom Shinya (def. Akito Sagimura)	February 3, 2008	
8 (interim)	(Japan) Noriyuki Enari (def. Akito Sagimura)	September 12, 2008	
9	(Japan) Phantom Shinya (def. Noriyuki Enari)	September 4, 2008	
10	(Japan) Ryuya Kusakabe (def. Phantom Shinya)	September 18, 2010	
11	(Japan) Masahiro Fujimoto (def. Kazuyuki Fushimi)	June 3, 2012	
12	(Japan) Kazuyuki Fushimi (def. Masahiro Fujimoto)	February 23, 2014	
13	(Japan) Taiki Naito (def. Kazuyuki Fushimi)	November 30, 2014	def. Seiki Ueyama on November 11, 2016; def. Seiki Ueyama on September 16, 2017
Naito vacated the title on June 10, 2018.
14	(Japan) Seiki Ueyama (def. Genki Takeno)	December 26, 2021	
15	(Japan) Koyata Yamada (def. Seiki Ueyama)	February 11, 2023	
Yamada vacated the title in 2024.
16	(Japan) Naoki Kasahara (def. Keito Naito)	February 14, 2026	

===== Bantamweight championship (formerly Junior Owlweight) =====
Weight limit: 52.5kg

No.	Name	Date	Defenses
1	(Japan) Kyo Kawakami (def. Syuto Sato)	November 24, 2019	
Kawakami vacated the title on November 11, 2021.
2	(Japan) Syuto Sato (def. Kazuyuki Fushimi)	December 26, 2021	
2	(Japan) Kai Katayama (def. Shuto Sato)	June 21, 2026	

=== Women Shoot Boxing Japan champions ===
==== Girls Japan S-cup ====
2014 SHOOT BOXING Japan Girls -48 kg S-cup
Date	Champion	Nationality	Event	Location	Runner-up	Nationality
2014-08-02	Yukari Yamaguchi	Japan	SHOOT BOXING Girls S-cup 2014	Tokyo, Japan	MIO	Japan

2015 SHOOT BOXING Japan Girls -48 kg S-cup
Date	Champion	Nationality	Event	Location	Runner-up	Nationality
2015-08-21	MIO	Japan	SHOOT BOXING Girls S-cup 2015	Tokyo, Japan	Momi	Japan

SHOOT BOXING Girls S-cup 2019
Date	Champion	Nationality	Event	Location	Runner-up	Nationality
2019-07-21	Megami	Japan	SHOOT BOXING Girls S-cup 2019	Tokyo, Japan	MISAKI	Japan

===== Women's Lightweight championship =====
Weight limit: 65kg

No.	Name	Date	Defenses
1	(Japan) Mina (def. Takako Mizoguchi)	November 28, 2020	

===== Women's Flyweight championship (formerly Ladybugweight) =====
Weight limit: 52kg

No.	Name	Date	Defenses
1	(Japan) Terumi Fujiyama (def. )		
2	(Japan) Fumiko Ishimoto (def. )		
3	(Japan) Kyoko Kamikaze (def. )	1990	
4	(Japan) Terumi Fujiyama (def. )		
5	(Japan) Rumi Nakamura (def. )	May 1, 1996	
6	(Japan) Ai Takahashi (def. RENA)	June 5, 2011	
Takahashi vacated the title when she retired on December 1, 2015.

===== Women's Strawweight championship =====
Weight limit: 49kg

No.	Name	Date	Defenses
1	(Japan) MIO (def. Union Akari)	November 11, 2016	def. MISAKI on February 10, 2018.

===== Women's Atomweight championship =====
Weight limit: 46kg

No.	Name	Date	Defenses
1	(Japan) MISAKI (def. Suzuka Tabuchi)	December 26, 2021	

=== Shoot Boxing International Men champions ===
==== World Heavyweight championship ====
Weight limit: 90kg

No.	Name	Date	Defenses
1	(Japan) Nobuki Iwashita (def. )		
2	(Australia) Adam Watt (def. Bill Lasfar)	October 27, 1995	

==== World Middleweight championship ====
Weight limit: 75kg

No.	Name	Date	Defenses
1	(Japan) Takeshi Caesar (def. John Navarolli)	August 13, 1988	
2	(United States) Manson Gibson (def. Takeshi Caesar)	May 26, 1989	

==== World Super Welterweight championship ====
Weight limit: 70kg

No.	Name	Date	Defenses
1	(Netherlands) Andy Souwer (def. Hiroyuki Doi)	February 1, 2004	
2	(Japan) Kaito (def. Samo Petje)	June 25, 2023	def. Petchmorakot Petchyindee Academy on April 13, 2024
Kaito vacated the title on April 13, 2026.

==== Australia Super Welterweight championship ====
Weight limit: 70kg

No.	Name	Date	Defenses
1	(Australia) Daniel Dawson (def. )		
2	(Australia) Luke Maitland (def. )		

==== Brazil Super Welterweight championship ====
Weight limit: 70kg

No.	Name	Date	Defenses
1	(Brazil) Marfio Canoletti (def. )		

==== America Super Welterweight championship ====
Weight limit: 70kg

No.	Name	Date	Defenses
1	(United States) Ronnie lewis (def. )	January 12, 2001	

==== World Welterweight championship ====
Weight limit: 67.5kg

No.	Name	Date	Defenses
1	(Japan) Hiroyuki Doi (def. Danny Steele)	January 12, 2001	

==== Oriental and Pacific Super Welterweight championship ====
Weight limit: 67.5kg

No.	Name	Date	Defenses
1	(Japan) Hiroki Shishido (def. Luke Maitland)	June 1, 2009	
Shishido vacated the title on June 30, 2012.
2	(Japan) Hiroki Shishido (def. Moody Rawai)	August 10, 2013	def. Jaoweha Grandthaiboxing on September 19, 2015

==== World Super Lightweight championship ====
Weight limit: 65kg

No.	Name	Date	Defenses
1	(Japan) Hiroaki Suzuki (def. Christian Baya)	August 22, 2015	
Suzuki vacated the title when he left the Shoot Boxing organization on August 31, 2018.

==== America Super Featherweight championship ====
Weight limit: 60kg

No.	Name	Date	Defenses
1	(United States) Shane Stafford (def. )		

=== Shoot Boxing International Women champions ===
==== Asia Tournament ====
2016 SHOOT BOXING Girls Asia Tournament
Date	Champion	Nationality	Event	Location	Runner-up	Nationality
2016-07-07	MIO	Japan	Shoot Boxing Girls S-cup 2016 ～Shichiseki Joshi Kaku Matsuri～	Tokyo, Japan	Union Akari	Japan

==== World Women's Flyweight championship ====
Weight limit: 52kg

No.	Name	Date	Defenses
1	(Japan) RENA (def. Kane Chopirom)	August 21, 2015	def. Klaudia Pawicka on July 7, 2016

== See also ==
- List of male kickboxers
- List of female kickboxers
- Sanda (sport)
- Shootfighting
- Shootwrestling
