= Erika Kamimura =

Japanese kickboxer (born 1992)

- Born: Erika Kamimura; December 30, 1992 (age 33); Tokyo, Japan
- Native name: 神村江里加
- Other names: The Strongest Female High School Student
- Nationality: Japanese
- Height: 1.58 m (5 ft 2 in)
- Weight: 47.7 kg (105 lb)
- Division: Mini-Flyweight
- Style: Kickboxing
- Stance: Orthodox
- Fighting out of: Tokyo, Japan
- Team: Target Gym
- Years active: 2008–present

Kickboxing record
- Total: 31
- Wins: 28
- By knockout: 15
- Losses: 3

Other information
- Website: ameblo.jp/ddondao/

Erika Kamimura (神村 江里加, kamimura erika; also written in Japan 神村 エリカ, using katakana script) (born December 30, 1992, in Tokyo) is a professional Japanese kickboxer. She won the 2011 Shoot Boxing Girls S-Cup tournament. She is also the former Rise Queen champion, WBC World Women's Mini Flyweight champion, WPMF World Women's Mini Flyweight champion, and is a former J-GIRLS Mini Flyweight champion.

== Kickboxing career ==
Having started karate while she was in junior high school, she started kickboxing in 2006 when she went to Yamato Dojo with her father. On February 4, 2007, Kamimura made her amateur debut and won by knockout. On March 31, 2007, she beat the younger Madoka Jinnai by unanimous decision.

On February 11, 2008, Kamimura made her professional debut against Mika, winning by decision at the age of 15. On April 13, 2008, she was named the MVP of the J-Grow 20 Amateur Tournament with her victory over Madoka Jinnai. An initial match between Kamimura and Ai Takahashi was canceled after Takahashi injured her zygomatic bone in training. As a result, Kamimura was entered into the 2011 Shoot Boxing Girls S-Cup. Having defeated the 2009 and 2010 champion, Rena Kubota, in an exhibition match, Kamimura was a heavy favorite going in. She won the tournament, finishing her first two opponents and defeating Seo Hee Ham in the final match by decision. Rena Kubota, who fought on the same event but not in the tournament, announced at the event that she would be fighting Kamimura for the first ever Rise Queen title.

Rena defeated Kamimura by decision to win the Rise Queen title at Rise 85. The fight would have been ruled a draw but deducted points gave the match to Rena. At Rise 87, Kamimura defeated Yau-en Fan in 33 seconds by knockout. Kamimura faced Seo Hee Ham in a rematch at Rise 88 on June 2, 2012. She defeated Ham by unanimous decision. With the victory, plans are being made for a rematch with Rena.

Kamimura entered the 2012 Shoot Boxing Girls S-Cup on August 25, 2012. She was defeated by Lorena Klijn via unanimous decision in the opening round of the tournament. She next faced Lomar Lookboonmee for the vacant WPMF World Women's Mini Flyweight (-47.7 kg/105 lb) Championship at RISE/M-1 ~Infinity~ in Tokyo on December 2, 2012. Kamimura defeated Lookboonmee by knockout in the third round.

Kamimura retained her WPMF title by defeating Churi Gothawynjim at M-FIGHT SUK WEERASAKRECK II Part.1 on June 16, 2013. Kamimura then faced off against J-Girls champion Momi for the vacant Rise Queen title at Rise 95 on September 13, 2013. She defeated Momi by unanimous decision to become the new Rise Queen champion.

In August, 2014 Kamimura retired from competition citing an unspecified incurable condition that was aggravated by the physical and mental stress of fighting. She maintains a normal life and continues to teach martial arts.

== Championships and accomplishments ==
=== Titles ===
- 2009 J-Girls Mini Flyweight champion
- 2009 WPMF World Women's Mini Flyweight champion
- 2010 WMC World Women's Mini Flyweight champion
- 2011 WBC World Women's Mini Flyweight champion
- 2011 Shoot Boxing Girls S-Cup winner
- 2012 WPMF World Women's Mini Flyweight champion
- 2013 Rise Queen champion

Awards

- eFight.jp
  - Fighter of the Month (August 2011)

== Fight record ==
Erika Kamimura kickboxing and shoot boxing record
28 wins (15 (T)KO's), 3 losses
Date	Result	Opponent	Event	Method	Round	Time	Record
2013-09-13	Win	(Japan) Momi	Rise 95	Decision (Unanimous)	5	3:00	28-3
Won vacant RISE Queen title.
2013-06-16	Win	(Thailand) Churi Gothawynjim	M-FIGHT SUK WEERASAKRECK II Part.1	TKO (Punches)	1	1:44	27-3
Defended WPMF World Women's Mini Flyweight (-47.7kg/105lb) Championship.
2012-12-02	Win	(Thailand) Loma Lookboonmee	RISE/M-1 ~Infinity~	KO (Right Straight)	3	1:21	26-3
Won vacant WPMF World Women's Mini Flyweight (-47.7kg/105lb) Championship.
2012-08-25	Loss	(Netherlands) Lorena Klijn	2012 Shoot Boxing Girls S-Cup, Quarterfinal	Decision (Unanimous)	4 (Ex.1)	2:00	25-3
2012-06-02	Win	(South Korea) Seo Hee Ham	Rise 88	Decision (Unanimous)	3	3:00	25-2
2012-03-24	Win	(China) Yau~en Fan	Rise 87	KO (Left Straight)	1	0:33	24-2
2011-11-23	Loss	(Japan) Rena Kubota	Rise 85 - Rise Heavyweight Tournament 2011	Decision (Unanimous)	5	3:00	23-2
For the inaugural RISE Queen (-48kg) title.
2011-10-02	Win	(England) Denise Castle	WBC Muay Thai Japan - The Path to the World Champion	KO (Left Hook)	1	1:49	23-1
Won WBC Muay Thai Inaugural Mini-Flyweight title.
2011-08-19	Win	(South Korea) Seo Hee Ham	2011 Shoot Boxing Girls S-Cup, Final	Decision (Unanimous)	3	2:00	22-1
Won 2011 Shoot Boxing Girls S-Cup title.
2011-08-19	Win	(Japan) Miyo Yoshida	2011 Shoot Boxing Girls S-Cup, Semi-Final	TKO (2 Knockdowns, Left Hook)	1	0:50	21-1
2011-08-19	Win	(Japan) Kanako Oka	2011 Shoot Boxing Girls S-Cup, Quarterfinal	TKO (Punches)	2	0:31	20-1
2011-07-23	Win	(Netherlands) Titiana van Polanen	Rise 80	TKO (3 Knockdowns, Left Hook)	1	2:01	19-1
2011-06-04	Win	(Italy) Silvia La Notte	Rise 78	TKO (Doctor Stoppage)	3	1:20	18-1
2011-04-17	Win	(Thailand) Tawan Por. Pramuk	Rise 76	KO (Left Hook)	1	0:21	17-1
2010-12-30	Win	(Japan) Chiharu	Sengoku Soul of Fight	TKO (Doctor Stoppage, Cut)	2	0:38	16-1
2010-11-14	Win	(Thailand) Namuwan Shiddjanchai	M-1 FAIRTEX SINGHA BEER Muay Thai Challenge	KO (Right Hook to the Body)	1	1:48	15-1
Won WMC Women's Mini-Flyweight title.
2010-09-12	Win	(Thailand) Nongnuen Soshiriwan	M-1 FAIRTEX SINGHA BEER Muay Thai Challenge	Decision (Unanimous)	5	2:00	14-1
Defended WPMF World Women's Mini-Flyweight title.
2010-07-25	Win	(Japan) Motoe Abe	J-NETWORK - J-GIRLS Catch The Stone 9	Decision (Unanimous)	5	2:00	13-1
Defended J-Girls Mini-Flyweight Title.
2010-05-16	Win	(South Korea) Ho Seongbok	Rise 65	KO (Left Straight)	1	0:58	12-1
2010-03-21	Win	(Thailand) Tonta	M-1 FAIRTEX SINGHA BEER Muay Thai Challenge	Decision (Unanimous)	3	3:00	11-1
2009-12-20	Loss	(Japan) Motoe Abe	J-NETWORK - J-GIRLS Final Stage 2009	Decision (Unanimous)	2	2:00	10-1
2009-12-20	Win	(Thailand) Neshian Por. Pramuk	J-NETWORK - J-GIRLS Final Stage 2009	Decision (Unanimous)	2	2:00	10-0
2009-09-13	Win	(Thailand) Payakuin Shitoniwato	M-1 FAIRTEX SINGHA BEER Muay Thai Challenge 2009 Yod Nak Suu vol.3	Decision (Unanimous)	3	2:00	9-0
Won WPMF World Women's Mini-Flyweight title.
2009-07-26	Win	(Japan) Haru Tajima	J-NETWORK - J-GIRLS Champion Festival 2009	Decision (Unanimous)	5	2:00	8-0
Won J-Girls Mini-Flyweight Title.
2009-04-05	Win	(Japan) Little Tiger	J-NETWORK - J-GIRLS Catch The Stone 2	Decision (Unanimous)	3	2:00	7-0
2009-01-18	Win	(Japan) Shyoko Hayashida	J-NETWORK - J-GIRLS Catch The Stone 1	Decision (Unanimous)	3	2:00	6-0
2008-11-09	Win	(Japan) Mai	J-NETWORK - J-GIRLS Final Stage 2008	KO (Right High Kick)	2	1:40	5-0
2008-09-07	Win	(Japan) Miho	J-NETWORK - J-GIRLS Hurricane Battle	TKO (3 Knockdowns, Right Middle Kick)	2	1:41	4-0
2008-07-21	Win	(Japan) Tomoko Kuramitsu	J-NETWORK - J-GIRLS Summer Kick Carnival	Decision (Unanimous)	3	2:00	3-0
2008-05-25	Win	(Japan) Yukiko Seki	J-NETWORK - J-GIRLS Ayame Festival	TKO (3 Knockdowns, Right Middle Kick)	3	1:38	2-0
2008-02-11	Win	(Japan) Mika	MARS 11 "2nd ANNIVERSARY"	Decision (Unanimous)	3	2:00	1-0
Legend: Win Loss Draw/No contest Notes

== Amateur record ==
Amateur Kickboxing Record
5 wins (3 (T)KO's), 1 loss, 1 Draw
Date	Result	Opponent	Event	Method	Round	Time	Record
2008-04-13	Win	(Japan) Madoka Jinnai	J-NETWORK - J-GROW 20 Amateur Tournament	Decision (Unanimous)	2	1:00	5-1-1
2007-11-04	Loss	(Japan) Madoka Jinnai	J-NETWORK - J-GIRLS Kazabana Festival	Decision (Unanimous)	3 (Ex.1)	1:30	4-1-1
2007-11-04	Win	(Japan) Suzuna Nakamura	J-NETWORK - J-GIRLS Kazabana Festival	KO	2	0:21	4-0-1
2007-05-20	Draw	(Japan) Saki Yamada	J-NETWORK - J-GIRLS Women's Festival Final round	Draw (Unanimous)	2	1:30	3-0-1
2007-04-15	Win	(Japan) Madoka Jinnai	Tenku Kickboxing Association	KO	2	0:54	3-0
2007-03-31	Win	(Japan) Madoka Jinnai	J-NETWORK - J-GIRLS Women's Festival 2nd Round	Decision (Unanimous)	2	1:30	2-0
2007-02-04	Win	(Japan) Itsuki Okamoto	J-NETWORK - J-GIRLS Women's Festival Opener	KO (Left Middle Kick)	1	0:20	1-0
Legend: Win Loss Draw/No contest Notes
