= Rena Kubota =

Japanese shoot wrestler, kickboxer, and mixed martial arts fighter

Rena
- Born: Rena Kubota; June 29, 1991 (age 35); Osaka, Japan
- Native name: レーナ, Reina
- Other names: Reina
- Height: 1.60 m (5 ft 3 in)
- Weight: 52 kg (115 lb)
- Division: Strawweight; Flyweight
- Style: Shoot boxing
- Stance: Orthodox
- Fighting out of: Konohana-ku, Osaka, Japan
- Team: Oikawa dojo
- Trainer: Tomohiro Oikawa
- Years active: 2007–present

Kickboxing record
- Total: 41
- Wins: 35
- By knockout: 11
- Losses: 5
- Draws: 1

Mixed martial arts record
- Total: 22
- Wins: 15
- By knockout: 8
- By submission: 2
- By decision: 5
- Losses: 7
- By submission: 5
- By decision: 2

Other information
- Website: Official blog (archived)
- Mixed martial arts record from Sherdog
- Last updated on: November 21, 2013

Rena Kubota (久保田 玲奈, Kubota Rena; Japanese pronunciation: [kɯbota ɾena]), better known by her ring name RENA (stylized in capital letters) or Reina, is a professional Japanese shoot wrestler, kickboxer and mixed martial artist, currently competing in the strawweight division of Rizin.

A professional competitor since 2007, Kubota previously competed as a kickboxer in the flyweight division of Shootboxing. She is a record six-time Shootboxing Girls S-Cup tournament winner, having won every tournament she took part in, and is the former Shootboxing flyweight champion.

Sherdog ranked her as a top ten atomweight between October 18, 2017, and May 24, 2021, while Fight Matrix ranked her as a top ten atomweight between July 1, 2017, and January 1, 2018. She was furthermore ranked as a top ten pound for pound kickboxer by Combat Press between November 2016 and June 2017, as well as between August 2017 and May 2018.

== Kickboxing career ==
=== Early life ===
Kubota was born in Osaka, Osaka Prefecture, Japan on June 29, 1991. She began training at Oikawa Dojo when she was a sixth grader.

=== Early career ===
Kubota made her kickboxing debut in the all-female promotion J-Girls at New Heroine Coming! on July 1, 2007. She lost a split decision to Asami Furuya in the flyweight New Heroine tournament semi-final. Kubota fought once more in J-Girls in the World Queen Tournament and defeated Mika Nagai by decision on November 4, 2007.

Kubota's next bout was her first in shoot boxing. She defeated Kanako Oka by decision at Shoot Boxing 2007 Mu-So 5th on December 23, 2007. Kubota won her next two fights in the Road to S-Cup series.

On June 1, 2008, Kubota fought to a draw with MMA fighter Miku Matsumoto in the Deep promotion in a kickboxing match at ClubDEEP Toyama Barbarian Festival 7. Kubota then returned to shoot boxing and won an extra-round decision against Misato Tomita on July 21, 2008.

Kubota's next fight, her second professional loss, came in a rematch against Miku Matsumoto at the Shoot Boxing World Tournament 2008 on November 24, 2008. Matsumoto won the fight by unanimous decision. Kubota then made her debut in K-1 at K-1 Award & MAX Korea 2009 on March 20, 2009. She was defeated via extra-round split decision against South Korean Muay Thai kickboxer Su Jeong Lim. The bout was Kubota's only fight for the promotion.

Kubota debuted in the Jewels promotion in a shoot boxing match at Jewels 4th Ring on July 11, 2009. She defeated Tomoko SP by decision.

=== 2009 Shootboxing Girls S-Cup ===
Kubota returned to shoot boxing and won her first Girls S-Cup title, at only 18 years old, at the 2009 Shoot Boxing Girls S-Cup on August 23, 2009. She defeated Masako Yoshida by decision, Saori Ishioka by TKO and finally Mei Yamaguchi by decision to win the tournament.

After winning the Girls S-Cup, Kubota won fights against Emi Fujino by TKO (doctor stoppage), Australian Christina Jurjevic by decision and Mika Nagai by decision in a rematch from their 2007 fight.

=== 2010 Shoot Boxing Girls S-Cup ===
Kubota was scheduled to face kickboxing and MMA legend Hisae Watanabe on April 11, 2010, but Kubota broke her finger and Watanabe faced an alternate opponent. The two would finally meet on August 29, 2010 during the 2010 Shoot Boxing Girls S-Cup. Kubota stunned everyone including Watanabe with her speed and aggressiveness. The #2-ranked Watanabe had been very confident of winning, but Kubota shocked everyone with her powerful performance and she defeated Watanabe by TKO. Kubota delivered a devastating knee to the body which caused Watanabe to fall to her knees. Watanabe was holding her stomach and was in severe pain and unable to continue the match.

Kubota went on to defeat American MMA fighter Kate Martinez by decision in the semi-final, then defeated Ai Takahashi by decision after two extra rounds in the final to win her second straight Girls S-Cup.

After her second victory of the Shoot Boxing Girls S-Cup, Kubota appeared at the pre-recorded TV program Beautiful women athletes full performance: TV 2011 Athletic Club of Fire (美女アスリート総出演"炎の体育会TV2011", Bijo Asurīto Sōshutsuen Honō no Taiiku-Kai TV 2011) on TBS on January 11, 2011, where she faced and defeated male comedians Yu Shinagawa, Hidetsugu Shibata and Koji Imada in exhibition bouts. While the show averaged 11.8% of TV rating, her appearance had the highest rating, 16.8%, and her ring name became the second-highest searched for keyword on Google Japan the next day.

Kubota was scheduled to fight South Korean fighter Sun Young Kim on April 23, 2011, at Shoot Boxing 2011 Act 2 in Tokyo, but Kim withdrew from the bout. As a result, Kubota faced J-Girls rising talent Erika Kamimura in an exhibition match in which Rena was knocked down once by her younger opponent in a single three-minute round, which surprised fans and pundits alike.

Kubota faced Ai Takahashi again in a five-round title fight at Shoot Boxing 2011 Act 3 on June 5, 2011. She was defeated by unanimous decision.

On August 19, 2011, Kubota faced Thai Zaza Sor. Aree in a non-tournament bout at the 2011 Shoot Boxing Girls S-Cup. Rena trapped Zaza in a standing arm-triangle choke and Zaza struggled violently to escape but was unable to. She was fading away and about to pass out when the referee broke the hold and awarded the point to Rena. It's a pity the referee did not let Rena put Zaza to sleep and therefore win by KO. Nevertheless, Rena won the match when she delivered a devastating punch to Sor Aree's stomach in round two which caused her to collapse to the mat. Flat on her back and holding her stomach in agony, Sor Aree was not able to continue and Rena won the match. This would be the second time that Rena's powerful attacks have left an opponent in so much pain that they are not able to get up and not able to continue the match. The first opponent to collapse in pain was Hisae Watanabe.

Kubota faced Bellator MMA veteran Jessica Penne in a shoot boxing match at Shoot Boxing 2011 Act 4 on September 10, 2011. She was defeated by majority decision after two extension rounds in a considerable upset.

Kubota faced Erika Kamimura in a rematch at Rise 85 on November 23, 2011. She defeated Kamimura by unanimous decision to become the first Rise Queen champion. Kubota vacated the Rise Queen title on July 23, 2013.

=== 2012 Shoot Boxing Girls S-Cup ===
Kubota entered the 2012 Shoot Boxing Girls S-Cup on August 25, 2012. She defeated Kim Townsend, Seo Hee Ham and Mei Yamaguchi in succession to become the 2012 Shoot Boxing Girls S-Cup tournament champion.

Kubota returned to face Taiwanese fighter Du Peiling at Shoot Boxing 2013: Act 2 on April 20, 2013. She defeated Peiling via third-round KO. Rena locked in a standing arm-triangle choke and then switched to a rear-naked choke. The referee stopped the match as Peiling was starting to lose consciousness.

On June 23, 2013, it was announced that Kubota would face Lorena Klijn during the 2013 Shoot Boxing Girls S-Cup Japan Midsummer Festival event on August 3, 2013. She defeated Klijn by majority decision after an extension round.

On November 16, 2013, at Shoot Boxing Battle Summit: Ground Zero Tokyo 2013, Kubota defeated late replacement opponent Maylee Won. Pomas by unanimous decision.

She was scheduled to fight Katie Klimansky-Casimir at Shootboxing 2014: Act 1 on February 23, 2014, but the fight was scrapped when the American fighter encountered immigration issues.

Kubota was scheduled to fight Yuri Kim at Shoot Boxing 2013: Tomohiro Oikawa Retirement Event on December 23, 2013. She won the fight by a first-round technical knockout.

Kubota faced Seo Hee Im at Shoot Boxing 2014: Act 2, on April 18, 2014. She won the fight by a first-round standing guillotine choke.

=== 2014 Shoot Boxing Girls S-Cup ===
Kubota participated in the 2014 Shoot Boxing Girls S-Cup tournament, and faced Simone van Dommelen in the quarterfinals. She beat Dommelen in the quarterfinals and Christina Jurjevic in the semifinals by unanimous decision. Kubota won the tournament with a second-round knockout of Thicha Rongrien Kila Korat.

Kubota was scheduled to fight Isis Verbeek at 2014 Shoot Boxing World S-Cup, on November 30, 2014. She beat Verbeek by unanimous decision.

Kubota fought Elli Maria Ekström at No Kick, No Life 2015, on February 11, 2015. Kubota won the fight by a second-round technical knockout.

=== Shoot Boxing Women's Flyweight champion ===
Kubota was scheduled to fight Kane Chopirom at Shoot Boxing Girls S-Cup 2015, on August 21, 2015, for the vacant Shoot Boxing Women's Flyweight championship. Kubota won the fight by a third-round technical knockout, stopping her opponent through a series of knees.

Kubota made her Rizin debut at the inaugural Rizin event, on April 17, 2016, against Cyndi Alves. She beat Alves by unanimous decision.

Kubota made her first title defense against Klaudia Pawicka at Shoot Boxing Girls S-Cup 2016, on July 7, 2016. She won the fight by a third-round technical knockout, forcing her opponent's corner to throw in the towel mid-way through the round.

Kubota's next fight was a non-title bout against Kinberly Novaes at Shoot Boxing World Tournament S-Cup 2016, on November 16, 2016. She won the fight by a unanimous decision.

Kubota fought Jleana Valentino in a non-title bout at Shoot Boxing Girl's S-Cup 2017, on July 7, 2017. She beat Valentino by unanimous decision.

== Mixed martial arts career ==
Kubota made her mixed martial arts debut against a fellow debutante in Jleana Valentino at Rizin World Grand-Prix 2015: Part 2 - Iza on December 31, 2015. She won the fight by submission, landing a flying armbar in the second round.

Kubota was scheduled to fight another debutante, the three-time world wrestling champion Miyuu Yamamoto, at Rizin FF 2: Rizin World Grand-Prix 2016: 1st Round on September 25, 2016. Kubota won the fight by a first-round submission, locking in a guillotine choke with ten seconds left in the round.

Kubota was scheduled to fight Hanna Gujwan at Rizin FF 4: Rizin World Grand-Prix 2016: Final Round on December 31, 2016. After an even first round, Kubota scored several knockdowns in the second round. She won the fight by a third-round technical knockout, dropping Gujwan with two liver kicks.

Kubota was scheduled to fight Dóra Perjés at Rizin FF 5: Sakura on April 16, 2017. It was Perjés' first fight since March 14, 2015, when she suffered her first professional loss to Vuokko Katainen. She won the fight by a first-round technical knockout, dropping Perjés with a liver punch at the 2:48 minute mark.

=== Rizin Women's Super Atomweight GP 2017 ===
It was announced on August 8, 2017, that Kubota would participate in the Rizin Super Atomweight Grand Prix. She was scheduled to face the former King of the Cage Atomweight champion Andy Nguyen in the quarterfinal bout at Rizin World Grand Prix 2017: Opening Round - Part 2 on October 15, 2017. She won the fight by a first-round technical knockout. Kubota began landing to the body as soon as the fight started, and ended the fight with a liver punch at the 3:23 minute mark.

Advancing to the semifinals, Kubota faced Irene Cabello Rivera at Rizin World Grand-Prix 2017: Final Round on December 31, 2017. Kubota won the fight by a first-round technical knockout.

Kubota was scheduled to fight Kanna Asakura in the finals of the Atomweight Grand Prix, held at Rizin World Grand-Prix 2017: Final Round on December 31, 2017. Asakura won the fight by a first-round submission. She locked in a rear-naked choke which rendered Kubota unconscious with 30 seconds left in the round.

=== Post-Atomweight GP ===
Kubota was scheduled to fight Elaine Leal at Shoot Boxing Girls S-Cup 2018, on July 6, 2018. It was her first mixed martial arts fight outside of Rizin. Kubota won the fight by unanimous decision.

Kubota was scheduled to fight a rematch with Kanna Asakura at Rizin 11, on July 29, 2018. Asakura outworked Kubota to a unanimous decision victory.

Kubota was scheduled to fight Samantha Jean-Francois at Rizin 14 on December 31, 2018. Kubota later pulled out of the fight, with her teammate Mio Tsumura later explaining that Kubota withdrew due to a tough weight cut made worse by her menstrual cycle. The fight was rescheduled for Rizin 15 on April 21, 2019. Kubota won the fight by unanimous decision.

Kubota was scheduled to fight Lindsey VanZandt at Bellator 222 on June 14, 2019. VanZandt won the fight by a first-round submission, choking Kubota unconscious with a rear-naked choke.

It was announced that Kubota would face Shawna Ram at Rizin 19 on October 12, 2019. On October 7, Rizin president Sakakibara revealed that Ram withdrew from the bout after suffering a concussion in training. Ram was replaced by the 0-3 Alexandra Alvare. Kubota made quick work of Alvare, knocking her out after just 20 seconds.

Kubota was scheduled to fight a rematch with Lindsey VanZandt at Rizin 20 on December 31, 2019. The rematch was scheduled six months after their first meeting, which VanZandt won by submission. Kubota won by a third-round technical knockout, stopping her opponent with ground and pound with just 18 seconds left in the fight.

Kubota moved up to strawweight for her next bout against Emi Tomimatsu. She was scheduled to fight the former Jewels champion at Rizin 24 on September 27, 2020. Kubota won the fight by unanimous decision.

Kubota faced Miyuu Yamamoto at Rizin 32 on November 20, 2021. She won the bout after catching Yamamoto with a knee on a takedown attempt.

Kubota faced Si Woo Park at Rizin 33 - Saitama on December 31, 2021. She lost the fight by unanimous decision.

Kubota faced the unbeaten Anastasiya Svetkivska in the quarterfinals of the Rizin Super Atomweight Grand Prix at Rizin 37 - Saitama on July 31, 2022. She won the fight by unanimous decision. Kubota was expected to face Seika Izawa in the tournament semifinals, but was forced to withdraw due to injury, as her orbital bone fracture hadn't yet healed.

Kubota faced Claire Lopez in a -51 kg catchweight bout at Rizin Landmark 5 on April 29, 2023. She lost the fight by a third-round submission.

Kubota faced Shim Yu-ri at RIZIN Landmark 9 on March 23, 2024. She won the fight by unanimous decision.

== Championships and accomplishments ==
=== Kickboxing ===
- Shootboxing
  - 2009 Shoot Boxing Girls S-Cup winner
  - 2010 Shoot Boxing Girls S-Cup winner
  - 2012 Shoot Boxing Girls S-Cup winner
  - 2014 Shoot Boxing Girls S-Cup winner
  - 2015 Shoot Boxing's Women's Flyweight Championship
  - 2016 Shoot Boxing Girls S-Cup winner
  - 2017 Shoot Boxing Girls S-Cup winner
- RISE
  - 2011 Rise Queen (-48 kg) champion

=== Mixed martial arts ===
- Rizin Fighting Federation
  - 2017 Rizin Women's Super Atomweight (49 kg) Runner-Up

=== Awards ===
- Jewels
  - 2009 Special Award (Jewels, December 20, 2009)
- eFight.jp
  - Fighter of the Month for November 2011, December 2015 and November 2021

== Mixed martial arts record ==
Professional record breakdown
22 matches	15 wins	7 losses
By knockout	8	0
By submission	2	5
By decision	5	2

Res.	Record	Opponent	Method	Event	Date	Round	Time	Location	Notes
Loss	15–7	Natalia Kuziutina	Submission (guillotine choke)	Super Rizin 5	September 10, 2026	2	3:14	Osaka, Japan	
Loss	15–6	Seika Izawa	Submission (guillotine choke)	Rizin: Shiwasu no Cho Tsuwamono Matsuri	December 31, 2025	2	1:58	Saitama, Japan	For the Rizin Super Atomweight Championship.
Win	15–5	Kate Oyama	TKO (punches)	Super Rizin 3	July 28, 2024	2	4:18	Saitama, Japan	
Win	14–5	Shim Yu-ri	Decision (unanimous)	Rizin Landmark 9	March 23, 2024	3	5:00	Kobe, Japan	
Loss	13–5	Claire Lopez	Submission (kneebar)	Rizin Landmark 5	April 29, 2023	3	4:21	Tokyo, Japan	Catchweight (112 lb) bout.
Win	13–4	Anastasiya Svetkivska	Decision (unanimous)	Rizin 37	July 31, 2022	3	5:00	Saitama, Japan	2022 Rizin Super Atomweight Grand Prix Quarterfinal. Later withdraw from the tournament due to injury.
Loss	12–4	Si Woo Park	Decision (unanimous)	Rizin 33	December 31, 2021	3	5:00	Saitama, Japan	
Win	12–3	Miyuu Yamamoto	TKO (knee and punches)	Rizin 32	November 20, 2021	2	3:35	Okinawa, Japan	Return to Super Atomweight.
Win	11–3	Emi Tomimatsu	Decision (unanimous)	Rizin 24	September 27, 2020	3	5:00	Saitama, Japan	Strawweight debut.
Win	10–3	Lindsey VanZandt	TKO (corner stoppage)	Rizin 20	December 31, 2019	3	4:42	Saitama, Japan	Catchweight (112 lb) bout.
Win	9–3	Alexandra Alvare	TKO (front kick and punches)	Rizin 19	October 12, 2019	1	0:20	Osaka, Japan	Catchweight (112 lb) bout.
Loss	8–3	Lindsey VanZandt	Technical Submission (rear-naked choke)	Bellator 222	June 14, 2019	1	4:04	New York City, New York, United States	Catchweight (112 lb) bout.
Win	8–2	Samantha Jean-Francois	Decision (unanimous)	Rizin 15	April 21, 2019	3	5:00	Yokohama, Japan	Catchweight (112 lb) bout.
Loss	7–2	Kanna Asakura	Decision (unanimous)	Rizin 11	July 29, 2018	3	5:00	Saitama, Japan	
Win	7–1	Elaine Leal	Decision (unanimous)	Shoot Boxing Girls S-Cup 2018	July 6, 2018	3	5:00	Tokyo, Japan	Catchweight (112 lb) bout.
Loss	6–1	Kanna Asakura	Technical Submission (rear-naked choke)	Rizin World Grand Prix 2017: Final Round	December 31, 2017	1	4:33	Saitama, Japan	2017 Rizin Super Atomweight Grand Prix Final.
Win	6–0	Irene Cabello Rivera	TKO (punches)	Rizin World Grand Prix 2017: Final Round	December 31, 2017	1	4:38	Saitama, Japan	2017 Rizin Super Atomweight Grand Prix Semifinal.
Win	5–0	Andy Nguyen	TKO (punch to the body)	Rizin World Grand Prix 2017: Opening Round - Part 2	October 15, 2017	1	3:23	Fukuoka, Japan	2017 Rizin Super Atomweight Grand Prix Quarterfinal.
Win	4–0	Dóra Perjés	TKO (punch to the body)	Rizin 2017 in Yokohama: Sakura	April 16, 2017	1	2:48	Yokohama, Japan	
Win	3–0	Hanna Gujwan	TKO (kick to the body)	Rizin FF 4: Rizin World Grand Prix 2016: Final Round	December 31, 2016	3	2:47	Saitama, Japan	
Win	2–0	Miyuu Yamamoto	Submission (guillotine choke)	Rizin World Grand Prix 2016: 1st Round	September 25, 2016	1	4:50	Saitama, Japan	Super Atomweight debut.
Win	1–0	Jleana Valentino	Submission (flying armbar)	Rizin World Grand Prix 2015: Part 2 - Iza	December 31, 2015	2	3:31	Saitama, Japan	Catchweight (112 lb) bout.

== Kickboxing and shoot boxing record ==
Rena Kubota kickboxing and shoot boxing record
35 wins (11 (T)KO's), 5 losses, 1 draw
Date	Result	Opponent	Event	Location	Method	Round	Time	Record
2017-07-07	Win	(Italy) Jleana Valentino	Shoot Boxing Girl's S-Cup 2017	Tokyo, Japan	Decision (unanimous)	3	3:00	35–5–1
2016-11-16	Win	(Brazil) Kinberly Novaes	Shoot Boxing World Tournament S-Cup 2016	Tokyo, Japan	Decision (unanimous)	3	3:00	34–5–1
2016-07-07	Win	(Poland) Klaudia Pawicka	Shoot Boxing Girls S-Cup 2016	Tokyo, Japan	TKO (corner stoppage)	3	1:42	33–5–1
Retained Shoot Boxing Women's Flyweight Championship.
2016-04-17	Win	(Brazil) Cyndi Alves	Rizin 1	Nagoya, Japan	Decision (unanimous)	3	3:00	32–5–1
2015-08-21	Win	(Thailand) Kane Chopirom	Shoot Boxing Girls S-Cup 2015	Tokyo, Japan	TKO (strikes)	3	1:58	31–5–1
Won vacant Shoot Boxing Women's Flyweight Championship.
2015-02-11	Win	(Sweden) Elli Maria Ekström	No Kick, No Life 2015	Tokyo, Japan	TKO (punches)	2	2:31	30–5–1
2014-11-30	Win	(Netherlands) Isis Verbeek	2014 Shoot Boxing World S-Cup	Tokyo, Japan	Decision (unanimous)	3	3:00	29–5–1
2014-08-02	Win	(Thailand) Thicha Rongrien Kila Korat	2014 Shoot Boxing Girls S-Cup, Final	Shibuya, Tokyo, Japan	KO (punch)	2	1:15	28–5–1
Won 2014 Shoot Boxing Girls S-Cup title.
2014-08-02	Win	(Australia) Christina Jurjevic	2014 Shoot Boxing Girls S-Cup, Semi-Final	Shibuya, Tokyo, Japan	Decision (unanimous)	3	2:00	27–5–1
2014-08-02	Win	(Netherlands) Simone van Dommelen	2014 Shoot Boxing Girls S-Cup, Quarterfinal	Shibuya, Tokyo, Japan	Decision (unanimous)	3	2:00	26–5–1
2014-04-18	Win	(South Korea) Seo Hee Im	Shoot Boxing 2014: Act 2	Koto, Tokyo, Japan	KO (standing guillotine choke)	1	2:50	25–5–1
2013-12-23	Win	(South Korea) Yuri Kim	Shoot Boxing 2013: Tomohiro Oikawa Retirement Event	Koto, Tokyo, Japan	TKO (punches)	1	2:40	24–5–1
2013-11-16	Win	(Thailand) Maylee Won. Pomas	Shoot Boxing Battle Summit: Ground Zero Tokyo 2013	Sumida, Tokyo, Japan	Decision (unanimous)	3	3:00	23–5–1
2013-08-03	Win	(Netherlands) Lorena Klijn	2013 Shoot Boxing Girls S-Cup	Shibuya, Tokyo, Japan	Decision (majority)	4 (Ex.1)	3:00	22–5–1
2013-04-20	Win	(Taiwan) Du Peiling	Shoot Boxing 2013: Act 2	Koto, Tokyo, Japan	KO (standing rear-naked choke)	3	1:12	21–5–1
2012-08-25	Win	(Japan) Mei Yamaguchi	2012 Shoot Boxing Girls S-Cup, Final	Shibuya, Tokyo, Japan	Decision (unanimous)	3	2:00	20–5–1
Won 2012 Shoot Boxing Girls S-Cup title.
2012-08-25	Win	(South Korea) Seo Hee Ham	2012 Shoot Boxing Girls S-Cup, Semi-Final	Shibuya, Tokyo, Japan	Decision (unanimous)	4 (Ex.1)	2:00	19–5–1
2012-08-25	Win	(Australia) Kim Townsend	2012 Shoot Boxing Girls S-Cup, Quarterfinal	Shibuya, Tokyo, Japan	Decision (unanimous)	3	2:00	18–5–1
2011-11-23	Win	(Japan) Erika Kamimura	Rise 85: Rise Heavyweight Tournament 2011	Bunkyo, Tokyo, Japan	Decision (unanimous)	5	3:00	17–5–1
Won Rise Queen title.
2011-09-10	Loss	(United States) Jessica Penne	Shoot Boxing 2011: Act 4	Koto, Tokyo, Japan	Decision (majority)	5 (Ex.2)	3:00	16–5–1
2011-08-19	Win	(Thailand) Zaza Sor. Aree	2011 Shoot Boxing Girls S-Cup	Shibuya, Tokyo, Japan	KO (body punch)	2	2:10	16–4–1
2011-06-05	Loss	(Japan) Ai Takahashi	Shoot Boxing 2011: Act 3	Koto, Tokyo, Japan	Decision (unanimous)	5	3:00	15–4–1
Fight was for the vacant Shoot Boxing Japanese Ladies title (50 kg).
2010-08-29	Win	(Japan) Ai Takahashi	2010 Shoot Boxing Girls S-Cup, Final	Chiyoda, Tokyo, Japan	Decision (unanimous)	5 (Ex.2)	2:00	15–3–1
Won 2010 Shoot Boxing Girls S-Cup title.
2010-08-29	Win	(United States) Kate Martinez	2010 Shoot Boxing Girls S-Cup, Semi-Final	Chiyoda, Tokyo, Japan	Decision (unanimous)	3	2:00	14–3–1
2010-08-29	Win	(Japan) Hisae Watanabe	2010 Shoot Boxing Girls S-Cup, Quarterfinal	Chiyoda, Tokyo, Japan	TKO (knee to the body)	2	1:50	13–3–1
2010-06-06	Win	(Japan) Mika Nagai	Shoot Boxing 25th Anniversary Series: Ishin 3rd	Koto, Tokyo, Japan	Decision (unanimous)	3	2:00	12–3–1
2010-02-13	Win	(Australia) Christina Jurjevic	Shoot Boxing 25th Anniversary Series: Kaimakusen	Koto, Tokyo, Japan	Decision (unanimous)	3	2:00	11–3–1
2009-11-18	Win	(Japan) Emi Fujino	Shoot Boxing 2009 - Bushido 5th	Koto, Tokyo, Japan	TKO (doctor stoppage)	2	2:00	10–3–1
2009-08-23	Win	(Japan) Mei Yamaguchi	2009 Shoot Boxing Girls S-Cup, Final	Koto, Tokyo, Japan	Decision (unanimous)	3	2:00	9–3–1
Won 2009 Shoot Boxing Girls S-Cup title.
2009-08-23	Win	(Japan) Saori Ishioka	2009 Shoot Boxing Girls S-Cup, Semi-Final	Koto, Tokyo, Japan	TKO (corner stoppage)	3	0:20	8–3–1
2009-08-23	Win	(Japan) Masako Yoshida	2009 Shoot Boxing Girls S-Cup, Quarterfinal	Koto, Tokyo, Japan	Decision (unanimous)	3	2:00	7–3–1
2009-07-11	Win	(Japan) Tomoko SP	Jewels 4th Ring	Koto, Tokyo, Japan	Decision (unanimous)	3	3:00	6–3–1
2009-03-20	Loss	(South Korea) Su Jeong Lim	K-1 Award & MAX Korea 2009	Seoul, South Korea	Decision (split)	4 (Ex.1)	2:00	5–3–1
2008-11-24	Loss	(Japan) Miku Matsumoto	Shoot Boxing World Tournament 2008	Saitama, Saitama, Japan	Decision (unanimous)	3	2:00	5–2–1
2008-07-21	Win	(Japan) Misato Tomita	Shoot Boxing 2008: Road to S-Cup 4th	Bunkyo, Tokyo, Japan	Decision (unanimous)	4 (Ex.1)	2:00	5–1–1
2008-06-01	Draw	(Japan) Miku Matsumoto	ClubDEEP Toyama Barbarian Festival 7	Toyama, Toyama, Japan	Draw (majority)	2	3:00	4–1–1
2008-04-04	Win	(Japan) Yuka Okumura	Shoot Boxing 2008: Road to S-Cup 2nd	Bunkyo, Tokyo, Japan	Decision (unanimous)	3	2:00	4–1–0
2008-02-03	Win	(Japan) Yukiko Seki	Shoot Boxing 2008: Road to S-Cup 1st	Bunkyo, Tokyo, Japan	TKO (doctor stoppage)	2	1:49	3–1–0
2007-12-23	Win	(Japan) Kanako Oka	Shoot Boxing 2007: Mu-So 5th	Osaka, Osaka, Japan	Decision (majority)	3	2:00	2–1–0
2007-11-04	Win	(Japan) Mika Nagai	J-Girls - World Queen Tournament	Koto, Tokyo, Japan	Decision (unanimous)	3	2:00	1–1–0
2007-07-01	Loss	(Japan) Asami Furuya	J-Girls - New Heroine Coming!, Semi-Final	Shinjuku, Tokyo, Japan	Decision (split)	3	2:00	0–1–0
Eliminated in the semi-final of the Flyweight New Heroine tournament.
Legend: Win Loss Draw/No contest Notes

== See also ==
- List of current Rizin FF fighters
- List of female kickboxers
