= Ryo Kubota =

Ryo Kubota may refer to:

- Ryo Kubota (footballer, born 1991) (窪田 良), Japanese football midfielder
- Ryo Kubota (footballer, born 2001) (窪田 稜), Japanese football midfielder
