= Zaza Sor. Aree =

Thai kickboxer

- Born: Angsana Kamhanphol; October 2, 1993 (age 33); Saraburi, Thailand
- Native name: ซาซ่า ศ.อารีย์
- Other names: Queen of Muaythai
- Nationality: Thai
- Height: 1.65 m (5 ft 5 in)
- Weight: 55–57 kg (121–126 lb; 8 st 9 lb – 9 st 0 lb)
- Division: Featherweight
- Style: Muay Thai Kickboxing
- Fighting out of: Bangkok, Thailand
- Team: Unaffiliated
- Rank: Rattakarn Kamharnpol
- Years active: 2007-present

Professional boxing record
- Total: 2
- Wins: 1
- Losses: 1

Kickboxing record
- Total: 41
- Wins: 33
- Losses: 6
- Draws: 1
- No contests: 1

Other information
- Boxing record from BoxRec
- Last updated on: August 25, 2017

Zaza Sor. Aree
Medal record

Representing Thailand

Women's Muay Thai

IFMA World Muaythai Championships
Silver medal – second place	2009	Flyweight (52 kg)

Zaza Sor. Aree (Thai: ซาซ่า ศ.อารีย์), real name Angsana Kamhanphol (Thai: อังศนา คำหาญพล), born on October 2, 1993 is a Thai kickboxer. She is the former women's flyweight world champion of the World Professional Muaythai Federation (WPMF). Zaza is also a popular actress and singer in her native country.

== Early years ==
Zaza Sor. Aree was born on October 2, 1993 in Saraburi Thailand. She played a lot of sports when she was a kid. While her favorite sport was actually horse riding, her father taught her Muaythai. After three months of training, he sent her to a fight at a temple fair in Saraburi. Zaza won her first match, and started her career as a Muaythai fighter at only thirteen years old.

== Career ==
=== Rise in Muay Thai ===
Zaza kept on winning her matches and her reputation as an up-and-coming fighter spread in the Muaythai community. She won the vacant WPMF women's World Flyweight title aged 15 and became the first Thai female to become world muaythai champion. Originally scheduled to fight Canadian Vernica Tiger for the championship on December 4, 2008, Sor Aree defeated Greek Farni Kiatchionson by points decision. On August 12, 2009, Sor Aree defeated fellow countrywoman Farsai Nongkipahuyuth by decision, retaining her title.

In her first fight overseas, Zaza defended her WPMF women's World Flyweight championship again on November 8, 2009 in Japan, when she defeated Gracyer Aki by unanimous decision after five rounds. At the end of 2009 she took part in the IFMA Amateur Muaythai World Championships in Bangkok, Thailand. She won the silver medal in the Flyweight category. On January 16, 2010, Sor Aree won her bout by decision against Ploy Suay Sukroong Ruang at Thailand vs Challenger Series.

Zaza was scheduled to defend her WPMF title against Slovak Lucia Krajcovicova on August 12, 2011 at Thailand vs Challenger: Queen's Birthday 2011 but, for unknown reasons, her opponent was changed to English Iman Barlow (also known as Aman Jitti Gym) a few hours before the date, leading ultimately to the cancellation of the bout due to Iman Barlow not meeting the required.

=== Mixed fortunes in Shootboxing ===
Sor Aree also took part in Shootboxing, but with less success. She participated in the tournament Shoot boxing Girl's S-cup 2010 on August 29, 2010, but was defeated in the first round of the tournament by American purple belt in Brazilian Jiu-Jitsu Kate Martinez. Sor Aree managed to land some good shots but Kate was obviously the harder hitter and towards the end of the match, Sor Aree appeared to be exhausted and in a daze. Kate took advantage of this and trapped her in a standing arm-triangle choke in the third round. Sor Aree’s eyes rolled back into her head and the referee called for the bell as Kate put Sor Aree to sleep.

On August 19, 2011, Sor. Aree competed in Shootboxing for the third time against Shootboxing star Rena Kubota. Rena won the match in the second round when Rena landed a powerful body punch that floored Sor Aree, who was unable to get back up.

=== Short stint in boxing ===
In April 2008, Sor. Aree announced that she would try professional boxing. She made her debut on September 5, 2008, against Namfon Por Muangpetch. She won her bout by decision. However, one month later she was defeated by her fellow countrywoman Yani Kokietgym. After her loss Sor. Aree choose not to pursue a full-time boxing career.

=== Comeback in 2015 ===
After having stopped with professional Muay Thai while pursuing a University degree ZaZa Sor Aree started a comeback in April 2015 (won) and, as the time of writing, is looking to come back full-time while also pursuing further TV and Muay Thai teaching commitments.

== Championships and accomplishments ==
- Member of Thailand Kickboxing National Team (56 kg Lowkick Rank 9)
- 2017 GLORY 46 -Guangzhou, China
- 2017 PPTV S1 One-Songchai Championship Bangkok
- 2016 E-1 World Champion WMC 52 kg (Hong Kong)
- 2010 Thailand Versus Challenger Champion-WMC (Queens Cup Thailand)
- 2009 Silver medal at the IFMA World Muaythai Championship
- 2009 WPMF World Champion 50 kg (Japan)
- 2009 WPMF World Champion 48 kg (Thailand)
- 2007 Asawindam Stadium Championship (Thailand)
- 2007 Channel 9 Popular Award (Thailand)
- Winner in Queen's and King's Birthday
- Member of Thailand Muaythai National team
- GLORY Kickboxing fighter

== Kickboxing record ==
Kickboxing record
41 fights, 33 Wins, 6 Losses, 1 No contests
Date	Result	Opponent	Event	Location	Method	Round	Time	Record
2026-06-02	Win	(Thailand) Petchsamart	Siam Real Combat	Bangkok, Thailand	Decision	3	3:00	
2018-02-06	Win	(England) Lisa Brierley	Muay Thai Day	Bangkok, Thailand	Decision	3	3:00	
2017-10-14	NC	(China) Liu Jia	Glory 46: China	Guangzhou, China	No Contest (Accidental Elbow)	2	1:10	
2017-02-06	Win	(United States) Sylvie von Duuglas-Ittu	National Muaythai Day - Channel 9	Bangkok, Thailand	Decision	3	3:00	
2016-11-20	Win	(Hong Kong) Cori Chiu	E-1 World Championship - WMC	Hong Kong - China	Decision	3	3:00	
2016-09-16	Win	(Thailand) Emmypisa	S1 - One Songchai - PPTV	Bangkok - Thailand	Decision	4	2:00	
2016-21-03	Win	(Slovenia) Monika Singpathong	R-1 Knockout Event	Bangkok, Thailand	Decision	3	3:00	
2015-08-12	Win	(Costa Rica) Marcela Soto	The Rising Queen Warrior	Chiangrai, Thailand	Decision	3	3:00	
2015-04-26	Win	(Thailand) Krataithong Por Promin	Thapsakae Fight Night	Thapsakae, Thailand	Decision	4	2:00	
2011-08-19	Loss	(Japan) Rena Kubota	Shoot Boxing Girls S-Cup 2011	Tokyo, Japan	KO (Punch to the body)	2	2:10	
2010-08-29	Loss	(United States) Kate Martinez	Shoot Boxing Girls S-Cup 2010, 1st round	Tokyo, Japan	KO (Technical submission, standing arm-triangle choke)	3	1:12	
2010-05-08	Loss	(Russia) Ekaterina Izotova	Star of Victory	Moscow, Russia	Decision	5	3:00	
2010-01-16	Win	(Thailand) Ploy Suay Sukroong Ruang	Thailand Vs Challenger Series	Bangkok, Thailand	Decision	3	3:00	
2009-12	Loss	(Morocco) Jihane Mezyaive	IFMA World Muaythai Championships 2009	Bangkok, Thailand	Decision	4	3:00	
Fight was for IFMA World Muaythai Championships women's flyweight gold medal.
2009-12	Win	(United States) Gilberty Santiago Guido	IFMA World Muaythai Championships 2009	Bangkok, Thailand	Decision	4	3:00	
2009-11	Win		IFMA World Muaythai Championships 2009	Bangkok, Thailand	Decision	4	3:00	
2009-11-08	Win	(Japan) Gracyer Aki	M-1 Fairtex Singha Beer Muay Thai Challenge 2009: Yod Nak Suu Vol. 4	Tokyo, Japan	Decision (unanimous)	5	3:00	
Retains WPMF women's World flyweight title.
2009-08-12	Win	(Thailand) Farsai Nongkipahuyuth	OneSongchai	Bangkok, Thailand	Decision	4	3:00	
Retains WPMF women's World flyweight title.
2008-12-04	Win	(Greece) Farni Kiatchionson	King's Birthday	Bangkok, Thailand	Decision	4	3:00	
Wins vacant WPMF women's World flyweight title.
2008-11-02	Loss	(Thailand) Duennapa Kiatkriengsak	Suek Assawindam	Bangkok, Thailand	Decision	4	2:00	
2008-09-05	Win	(Thailand) Namfon Por Muangpetch	Channel 9	Bangkok, Thailand	Decision	4	2:00	
2008-08-31	Win	(Thailand) Nongkluay Sor Penprapa	Suek Assawindam	Bangkok, Thailand	Decision	4	2:00	
2008-07-06	Win	(Thailand) Nong Gluay Sor Penprapa	Suek Assawindam	Bangkok, Thailand	Decision	4	2:00	
2008-03-02	Win	(Thailand) Jomkwan Sitpaneng	Suek Assawindam	Bangkok, Thailand	Decision	4	2:00	
2007-12-16	Win	(Thailand) Rabeabrat Peanratana	Suek Assawindam	Bangkok, Thailand	Decision	4	2:00	
Legend: Win Loss Draw/No contest Notes

== See also ==
- List of female kickboxers
