= Moeri Suda =

Japanese mixed martial artist

- Born: July 29, 2004 (age 22); Osaka, Japan
- Native name: 須田萌里
- Nationality: Japanese
- Height: 5 ft 2 in (1.57 m)
- Weight: 104.3 lb (47 kg; 7 st 6 lb)
- Division: Atomweight
- Style: Brazilian Jiu Jitsu
- Stance: Orthodox
- Fighting out of: Osaka, Japan
- Team: Scorpion Gym
- Rank: Purple belt in Brazilian Jiu Jitsu under Tomoyuki Suda
- Years active: 2020–present

Mixed martial arts record
- Total: 23
- Wins: 15
- By submission: 10
- By decision: 5
- Losses: 8
- By knockout: 1
- By submission: 1
- By decision: 6

Other information
- Mixed martial arts record from Sherdog

Moeri Suda (須田萌里, born July 29, 2004) is a Japanese mixed martial artist, who currently competes in the atomweight division of Jewels.

== Mixed martial arts career ==
=== DEEP ===
Suda was expected to make her professional debut against Rion Noda at DEEP JEWELS 30 on October 31, 2020. Noda withdrew from the fight on October 13, after suffering an injury in training, and was replaced by Aya Murakami. Although the fight was ruled a majority decision after the two rounds were contested, with one scorecard of 20–18 for Murakami and two even 19–19 scorecards, the victory was awarded to Murakami under the DEEP JEWELS rules.

After suffering a decision loss at the hands of Moe Sasaki in her second outing against Moe Sasaki at DEEP JEWELS 31, Suda rebounded with a decision victory over Mika Sakamoto at DEEP Osaka Impact 2021 on April 4, 2021, before being booked to face Tomoko Hida at DEEP Osaka Impact 2021 on July 18, 2021. She won the fight by a second-round submission, the first stoppage victory of her professional career.

Suda faced Otoha Nagao at DEEP Tokyo Impact 2021 1st Round on October 16, 2021. She won the fight by unanimous decision, with two scorecards of 20–17 and one scorecard of 20–18.

Suda faced Eru Takebayashi at DEEP JEWELS 35 on December 11, 2021. She won the fight by a first-round submission.

Suda faced the 2021 DEEP Jewels Atomweight Grand Prix finalist Hikaru Aono at DEEP JEWELS 36 on March 12, 2022. She won the fight by a first-round submission.

Suda challenged Saori Oshima for the Jewels Atomweight Championship at DEEP JEWELS 37 on DEEP JEWELS 37. She lost the fight by a first-round submission.

=== RIZIN & JEWELS ===
Suda made her Rizin Fighting Federation debut against Mizuki Oshiro at Rizin 36 – Okinawa on July 2, 2022. She won the fight by a first-round submission.

Suda faced Aya Murakami in a rematch at Deep Jewels 38 on September 11, 2022, having previously suffered a unanimous decision loss at the hands of Murakami in both of their professional debuts. Suda won the fight by unanimous decision.

Suda faced Miki Motono at Deep Jewels 39 on November 22, 2022. She lost the fight by unanimous decision.

Suda faced Yuko Kiryu at DEEP Tokyo Impact 2023 2nd Round on March 25, 2023. She won the fight by a second-round submission, as she forced Kiryu to tap to a rear-naked choke 53 seconds into the round. Following this victory, Suda was ranked as the tenth best women's atomweight mixed martial artist by Fight Matrix.

Suda was booked to face Jeong Eun Park at Deep Jewels 41 on May 28, 2023. She lost the fight by a first-round technical knockout.

Suda faced Kate Oyama at Deep Jewels 42 on September 10, 2023. She won the fight by unanimous decision.

Suda faced Saki Kitamura at Deep Jewels 43 on November 23, 2023. She won the fight by a first-round submission.

Suda faced Si Yoon Park at Black Combat 10 on January 20, 2024. She lost the fight by unanimous decision.

Suda faced Ye Ji Lee at DEEP OSAKA IMPACT 2024 3rd ROUND on September 22, 2024. She won the fight by a first-round submission.

Suda faced Akari Kamise at DEEP OSAKA IMPACT 2024 4th ROUND on December 22, 2024. She won the fight by a second-round submission.

Suda faced Ayaka Hamasaki at Deep Jewels 48 on March 23, 2025. She won the fight by a first-round submission.

Suda faced Noeru Narita at Super Rizin 4 on July 27, 2025. She won the fight by a second-round submission.

Suda faced Saori Oshima in a rematch after about three years at DEEP 127 Impact on September 15, 2025. She lost the fight by unanimous decision.

== Championships and accomplishments ==
=== Jiu-jitsu ===
- Japan Brazilian Jiu-Jitsu Federation
  - 2017 West Japan Kids Jiu-Jitsu White Belt Featherweight Runner-up
  - 2017 Chubu Jiu-Jitsu Open Kids White Belt Featherweight Champion
  - 2018 Kansai Jiu-Jitsu Open Teen Yellow Belt Featherweight Champion
  - 2018 Chubu Jiu-Jitsu Open Teen Yellow Belt Featherweight Champion
  - 2018 Kansai Jiu-Jitsu Open Teen Green Belt Featherweight Champion
  - 2021 All Japan Youth Blue Belt Lightweight Runner-up & Openweight Champion
- Shooto
  - 2023 Shooto Cup Jiu-Jitsu Championship Purple Belt Featherweight Champion

== Mixed martial arts record ==
Professional record breakdown
| 23 matches | 15 wins | 8 losses |
| By knockout | 0 | 1 |
| By submission | 10 | 1 |
| By decision | 5 | 6 |

| Res. | Record | Opponent | Method | Event | Date | Round | Time | Location | Notes |
|---|---|---|---|---|---|---|---|---|---|
| Loss | 15–8 | Park Si-woo | Decision (unanimous) | Rizin Landmark 15 | July 18, 2026 | 3 | 5:00 | Hiroshima, Japan | |
| Win | 15–7 | Namiko Kawabata | Decision (unanimous) | DEEP Osaka Impact 2026 1st Round | March 8, 2026 | 3 | 5:00 | Osaka, Japan | |
| Loss | 14–7 | Saori Oshima | Decision (unanimous) | DEEP 127 Impact | September 15, 2025 | 3 | 5:00 | Tokyo, Japan | Atomweight bout. |
| Win | 14–6 | Noeru Narita | Submission (armbar) | Super Rizin 4 | July 27, 2025 | 2 | 3:02 | Saitama, Japan | |
| Win | 13–6 | Ayaka Hamasaki | Submission (rear-naked choke) | Deep Jewels 48 | March 23, 2025 | 1 | 2:28 | Tokyo, Japan | |
| Win | 12–6 | Akari Kamise | Submission (armbar) | DEEP Osaka Impact 2024: 4th Round | December 22, 2024 | 2 | 2:07 | Osaka, Japan | Atomweight bout. |
| Win | 11–6 | Lee Ye-ji | Submission (armbar) | DEEP Osaka Impact 2024: 3rd Round | September 22, 2024 | 1 | 3:17 | Osaka, Japan | |
| Loss | 10–6 | Park Si-yoon | Decision (unanimous) | Black Combat 10 | January 20, 2024 | 3 | 5:00 | Seoul, South Korea | For the Black Combat Atomweight Championship. |
| Win | 10–5 | Saki Kitamura | Technical Submission (armbar) | Deep Jewels 43 | November 23, 2023 | 1 | 0:49 | Tokyo, Japan | |
| Win | 9–5 | Kate Oyama | Decision (unanimous) | Deep Jewels 42 | September 10, 2023 | 2 | 5:00 | Tokyo, Japan | |
| Loss | 8–5 | Jeong Eun Park | TKO (punches) | Deep Jewels 41 | May 28, 2023 | 1 | 4:27 | Tokyo, Japan | |
| Win | 8–4 | Yuko Kiryu | Submission (rear-naked choke) | DEEP Tokyo Impact 2023: 2nd Round | March 25, 2023 | 2 | 0:53 | Tokyo, Japan | Atomweight bout. |
| Loss | 7–4 | Miki Motono | Decision (unanimous) | Deep Jewels 39 | November 23, 2022 | 3 | 5:00 | Tokyo, Japan | |
| Win | 7–3 | Aya Murakami | Decision (unanimous) | Deep Jewels 38 | September 11, 2022 | 3 | 5:00 | Tokyo, Japan | Atomweight bout. |
| Win | 6–3 | Mizuki Oshiro | Submission (armbar) | Rizin 36 | July 2, 2022 | 1 | 2:12 | Okinawa, Japan | |
| Loss | 5–3 | Saori Oshima | Technical Submission (kimura) | Deep Jewels 37 | May 8, 2022 | 1 | 2:58 | Tokyo, Japan | For the Jewels Atomweight Championship. |
| Win | 5–2 | Hikaru Aono | Technical submission (armbar) | Deep Jewels 36 | May 8, 2022 | 1 | 3:36 | Tokyo, Japan | |
| Win | 4–2 | Eru Takebayashi | Submission (armbar) | Deep Jewels 35 | December 11, 2021 | 1 | 4:41 | Tokyo, Japan | |
| Win | 3–2 | Otoha Nagao | Decision (unanimous) | DEEP Tokyo Impact 2021: 1st Round | October 17, 2021 | 2 | 5:00 | Tokyo, Japan | |
| Win | 2–2 | Tomoko Hida | Submission (armbar) | DEEP Osaka Impact 2021 | July 18, 2021 | 2 | 3:40 | Osaka, Japan | |
| Win | 1–2 | Mika Sakamoto | Decision (unanimous) | DEEP Osaka Impact 2021 | April 4, 2021 | 2 | 5:00 | Osaka, Japan | Return to Super Atomweight. |
| Loss | 0–2 | Moe Sasaki | Decision (unanimous) | Deep Jewels 31 | December 19, 2020 | 2 | 5:00 | Tokyo, Japan | Atomweight debut. |
| Loss | 0–1 | Aya Murakami | Decision (unanimous) | Deep Jewels 30 | October 31, 2020 | 2 | 5:00 | Tokyo, Japan | Super Atomweight debut. |

== See also ==
- List of female mixed martial artists
