= Deep Jewels events =

Jewels MMA events

These are the Deep Jewels events held by the Japanese mixed martial arts (MMA) organization Deep. The Jewels MMA events were previously held by Jewels before Deep absorbed its operations on May 25, 2013.

== Deep Jewels 1 ==
Deep Jewels 1
- Promotion: Deep
- Date: August 31, 2013
- Venue: Shinjuku Face
- City: Tokyo, Japan

Event chronology
Deep Jewels 1	Deep Jewels 2

Deep Jewels 1, originally Deep Jewels: Starting a new business game (DEEP JEWELS 旗揚げ戦, deep jewels hataage sen) was the inaugural MMA event of the Deep Jewels brand after Jewels promotion ceased operations to move the brand to Deep promotion. The event took place on August 31, 2013 at Shinjuku Face in Kabukicho, Tokyo, Japan.

Main event
Weight class				Method	Round	Time	Notes
Lightweight (52 kg)	Emi Fujino	def.	Hyo Kyung Song	Submission (rear-naked choke)	2	3:34
57.5 kg	Kozue Nagashima	def.	Ji Yun Kim	Decision (majority)	3	3:00	(Note: Kickboxing bout. Kickboxing rules)
Lightweight (52 kg)	Mika Nagano	def.	Akiko Naito	Submission (armbar)	1	2:24
Featherweight (48 kg)	Sadae Numata	def.	Celine Haga	Decision (split)	2	5:00
52 kg	Rena Matsuda	drew	Rumina Kurihara	Draw (majority)	3	2:00	(Note: Kickboxing bout. Kickboxing rules)
53 kg	Yuko Oya	def.	Yasuko Mogi	Decision (split)	2	5:00
Lightweight (52 kg)	Rikako Yuasa	def.	Mizuki Inoue	Decision (unanimous)	2	4:00	(Note: Grappling bout)
46 kg	Yasuko Tamada	def.	Yukiko Seki	Decision (unanimous)	2	5:00
Featherweight (48 kg)	Masako Yoshida	def.	Satomi Takano	Decision (unanimous)	2	5:00
Featherweight (48 kg)	Miyoko Kusaka	def.	Fukuko Hamada	Decision (unanimous)	2	5:00
Lightweight (52 kg)	Megumi Sugimoto	def.	Takumi Umehara	Decision (unanimous)	2	5:00	(Note: No ground-and-pound rules)
55 kg	Sachiko Fujimori	def.	Sumire Takahashi	Submission (rear-naked choke)	1	0:49	(Note: No ground-and-pound rules)

== Deep Jewels 2 ==
Deep Jewels 2
- Promotion: Deep
- Date: November 4, 2013
- Venue: Shinjuku Face
- City: Tokyo, Japan

Event chronology
Deep Jewels 1	Deep Jewels 2	Deep Jewels 3

Deep Jewels 2, originally Deep Jewels 2: 2nd generation Deep Jewels lightweight championship determination GP 1st round (DEEP JEWELS 2 第2代DEEP JEWELSライト級王座決定GP1回戦, deep jewels 2: dai 2 dai deep jewels raito kyūōza kettei GP 1 kaisen) was the second MMA event of the Deep Jewels brand held by the Japanese promotion Deep. The event took place on November 4, 2013 at Shinjuku Face in Kabukicho, Tokyo, Japan. The event featured Seo Hee Ham defending the Deep Jewels featherweight championship, which she won in the Jewels promotion by defeating Naho Sugiyama in the last Jewels event, against Sadae Numata, who won the right to challenge for the championship at Deep Jewels 1. The event also held the first round of the Deep Jewels lightweight tournament to crown a new lightweight champion after former Jewels champion Ayaka Hamasaki had to relinquish the title due to injuries that would leave her unable to compete for some time. The participants of the tournament were Emi Fujino, Mika Nagano, Mizuki Inoue and Emi Tomimatsu. In October 2013 two more bouts were announced, including the debut of former Jewels champion Naho Sugiyama under the Deep Jewels brand. The two more matches were later announced.

Main event
Weight class				Method	Round	Time	Notes
Lightweight (52 kg)	Emi Tomimatsu	def.	Mika Nagano	Decision (unanimous)	2	5:00	(Note: Deep Jewels lightweight grand prix semi-final)
Lightweight (52 kg)	Mizuki Inoue	def.	Emi Fujino	Decision (unanimous)	2	5:00	(Note: Deep Jewels lightweight grand prix semi-final)
Featherweight (48 kg)	Seo Hee Ham	def.	Sadae Numata	Decision (unanimous)	3	5:00	(Note: For Deep Jewels featherweight championship)
Featherweight (48 kg)	Naho Sugiyama	def.	Masako Yoshida	Decision (unanimous)	2	5:00
53.5 kg	Sachiko Fujimori	def.	Megumi Sugimoto	Decision (split)	2	5:00	(Note: No ground-and-pound rules)
Featherweight (48 kg)	Yukiko Seki	def.	Madoka Ebihara	Decision (unanimous)	2	5:00
Lightweight (52 kg)	Ayaka Miura	def.	Asami Kodera	Decision (split)	2	4:00	(Note: Grappling bout)
Featherweight (48 kg)	Tamaki Usui	def.	Naomi Taniyama	Decision (unanimous)	2	5:00	(Note: No ground-and-pound rules)

== Deep Jewels 3 ==
Deep Jewels 3
- Promotion: Deep
- Date: February 16, 2014
- Venue: Shinjuku Face
- City: Tokyo, Japan

Event chronology
Deep Jewels 2	Deep Jewels 3	Deep Jewels 4

Deep Jewels 3 is an upcoming MMA event of the Deep Jewels brand to be held by the Japanese promotion Deep. The event will take place on February 16, 2014 at Shinjuku Face in Kabukicho, Tokyo, Japan. It will feature the Deep Jewels lightweight grand prix final between Emi Tomimatsu and Mizuki Inoue. Three more matches were announced in December 2013.

Main event
Weight class				Method	Round	Time	Notes
Lightweight (52 kg)	Emi Tomimatsu	def.	Mizuki Inoue	DQ (Inoue missing weight)	3	3:57	(Note: Deep Jewels lightweight grand prix final)
Openweight	Shizuka Sugiyama	def.	Mizuho Sato	TKO (doctor stoppage)	1	1:15
Featherweight (48 kg)	Naho Sugiyama	def.	Satomi Takano	Decision (split)	2	5:00
Featherweight (48 kg)	Masako Yoshida	def.	Miyoko Kusaka	Decision (unanimous)	2	5:00
(50 kg)	Yuko Oya	def.	Mamiko Mizoguchi	Submission (rear naked choke)	1	4:31
(53 kg)	Sachiko Fujimori	def.	Shiori Hori	Submission (rear naked choke)	2	0:23

== Deep Jewels 4 ==
Deep Jewels 4
- Promotion: Deep
- Date: May 18, 2014
- Venue: Shinjuku Face
- City: Tokyo, Japan

Event chronology
Deep Jewels 3	Deep Jewels 4	Deep Jewels 5

Deep Jewels 4 is an upcoming MMA event of the Deep Jewels brand to be held by the Japanese promotion Deep. The event will take place on May 18, 2014 at Shinjuku Face in Kabukicho, Tokyo, Japan.

Main event
Weight class				Method	Round	Time	Notes
Middleweight (61 kg)	Takayo Hashi	def.	Shizuka Sugiyama	TKO (punches)	3	4:20	(Note: Inaugural Middleweight Championship bout)
Featherweight (48 kg)	Saori Ishioka	def.	Satomi Takano	Technical Submission (armbar)	1	4:44
Featherweight (48 kg)	Mei Yamaguchi	def.	Yukiko Seki	Technical Submission (rear naked choke)	1	3:17
(51 kg)	Tomo Maesawa	def.	Brittany Anne Decker	Decision (unanimous)	2	5:00
Lightweight (52 kg)	Ayaka Miura	def.	Ella Wu	Technical Submission (arm-triangle choke)	1	1:25
Featherweight (48 kg)	Naomi Taniyama	def.	Yuko Kawabata	Decision (unanimous)	2	5:00
(56 kg)	Shiori Hori	def.	Maya Dobashi	Technical Submission (armbar)	1	4:43

== Deep Jewels 5 ==
Deep Jewels 5
- Promotion: Deep
- Date: August 9, 2014
- Venue: Shinjuku Face
- City: Tokyo, Japan

Event chronology
Deep Jewels 4	Deep Jewels 5	Deep Jewels 6

Deep Jewels 5 was a MMA event of the Deep Jewels brand to be held by the Japanese promotion Deep. The event took place on August 9, 2014 at Shinjuku Face in Kabukicho, Tokyo, Japan.

Main event
Weight class				Method	Round	Time	Notes
Lightweight (52 kg)	Mizuki Inoue	def.	Emi Tomimatsu (c)	Submission (arm bar)	3	1:33	(Note: Lightweight Championship bout)
Featherweight (48 kg)	Ayaka Hamasaki	def.	Naho Sugiyama	TKO (punches)	1	4:01
Lightweight (52 kg)	Yuko Oya	def.	Tomo Maesawa	Decision (unanimous)	3	5:00
Featherweight (48 kg)	Mina Kurobe	def.	Masako Yoshida	Decision (unanimous)	3	5:00
Featherweight (48 kg)	Miyoko Kusaka	def.	Tamaki Usui	Technical Submission (arm bar)	2	2:40

== Deep Jewels 6 ==
Deep Jewels 6
- Promotion: Deep
- Date: November 3, 2014
- Venue: Shinjuku Face
- City: Tokyo, Japan

Event chronology
Deep Jewels 5	Deep Jewels 6	Deep Jewels 7

Deep Jewels 6 was an MMA event of the Deep Jewels brand held by the Japanese promotion Deep. The event took place on November 3, 2014 at Shinjuku Face in Kabukicho, Tokyo, Japan.

Main event
Weight class				Method	Round	Time	Notes
Featherweight (48 kg)	Seo Hee Ham (c)	def.	Saori Ishioka	Technical Submission (Armbar)	2	2:43	(Note: Featherweight Championship bout)
Lightweight (52 kg)	Emi Fujino	def.	Ayaka Miura	Decision (unanimous)	2	5:00
Middleweight (61 kg)	Shizuka Sugiyama	def.	Yurika Nakakura	Decision (unanimous)	2	5:00
Lightweight (52 kg)	Tomo Maesawa	def.	Yuko Oya	Decision (unanimous)	2	5:00
Featherweight (48 kg)	Mina Kurobe	def.	Satomi Takano	Technical Submission (rear naked choke)	1	4:02
Featherweight (48 kg)	Pan Hui	def.	Brittany Ann Decker	Decision (unanimous)	2	5:00
Featherweight (48 kg)	Yukiko Seki	def.	Naomi Taniyama	TKO (punches)	2	1:17

== Deep Jewels 7 ==
Deep Jewels 7
- Promotion: Deep
- Date: February 21, 2015
- Venue: Shinjuku Face
- City: Tokyo, Japan

Event chronology
Deep Jewels 6	Deep Jewels 7	Deep Jewels 8

Deep Jewels 7 was an MMA event of the Deep Jewels brand held by the Japanese promotion Deep. The event took place on February 21, 2015 at Shinjuku Face in Kabukicho, Tokyo, Japan.

Main event
Weight class				Method	Round	Time	Notes
Featherweight (48 kg)	Mei Yamaguchi	def.	Miyoko Kusaka	KO (knee to the body)	1	0:44	(Note: Deep Jewels Featherweight Grand Prix Quarterfinal)
Featherweight (48 kg)	Mina Kurobe	def.	Emi Tomimatsu	Decision (split)	2	5:00	(Note: Deep Jewels Featherweight Grand Prix Quarterfinal)
Featherweight (48 kg)	Satomi Takano	def.	Masako Yoshida	Decision (unanimous)	2	5:00	(Note: Deep Jewels Featherweight Grand Prix Quarterfinal)
Featherweight (48 kg)	Tomo Maesawa	def.	Yukiko Seki	Decision (unanimous)	2	5:00	(Note: Deep Jewels Featherweight Grand Prix Quarterfinal)

== Deep Jewels 8 ==
Deep Jewels 8
- Promotion: Deep
- Date: May 31, 2015
- Venue: Shinjuku Face
- City: Tokyo, Japan

Event chronology
Deep Jewels 7	Deep Jewels 8	Deep Jewels 9

Deep Jewels 8 was an MMA event of the Deep Jewels brand held by the Japanese promotion Deep. The event took place on May 31, 2015 at Shinjuku Face in Kabukicho, Tokyo, Japan.

Main event
Weight class				Method	Round	Time	Notes
Featherweight (48 kg)	Mei Yamaguchi	def.	Satomi Takano	TKO (punches)	2	4:57	(Note: Deep Jewels Featherweight Grand Prix Final; Vacant Featherweight Championship bout)
Lightweight (52 kg)	Tushara Veerella	def.	Misaki Takomoto	Decision (unanimous)	2	5:00
Featherweight (48 kg)	Mei Yamaguchi	def.	Mina Kurobe	Decision (unanimous)	2	5:00	(Note: Deep Jewels Featherweight Grand Prix Semifinal)
Featherweight (48 kg)	Satomi Takano	def.	Tomo Maesawa	Decision (unanimous)	2	5:00	(Note: Deep Jewels Featherweight Grand Prix Semifinal)

== Deep Jewels 9 ==
Deep Jewels 9
- Promotion: Deep
- Date: August 29, 2015
- Venue: Differ Ariake
- City: Tokyo, Japan

Event chronology
Deep Jewels 8	Deep Jewels 9	Deep Jewels 10

Deep Jewels 9 was an MMA event of the Deep Jewels brand held by the Japanese promotion Deep. The event took place on August 29, 2015 at Differ Ariake in Tokyo, Japan. This was the first event where all the championships were renamed to resemble the rest of the weight limits around the MMA world. The Middleweight Championship is now known as the Bantamweight Championship and the Lightweight Championship is now known as the Strawweight Championship.

Main event
Weight class				Method	Round	Time	Notes
Strawweight	Mizuki Inoue (c)	def.	Emi Fujino	Decision (unanimous)	3	5:00	(Note: Strawweight Championship bout)
Bantamweight	Ji Yeon Kim	def.	Takayo Hashi (c)	Decision (unanimous)	3	5:00	(Note: Bantamweight Championship bout)
Atomweight	Emi Tomimatsu	def.	Natsuki Shimomakise	Submission (armbar)	1	2:43

== Deep Jewels 10 ==
Deep Jewels 10
- Promotion: Deep
- Date: November 22, 2015
- Venue: Shinjuku Face
- City: Tokyo, Japan

Event chronology
Deep Jewels 9	Deep Jewels 10	Deep Jewels 11

Deep Jewels 10 was an MMA event of the Deep Jewels brand held by the Japanese promotion Deep. The event took place on November 22, 2015 at Shinjuku Face in Tokyo, Japan. The event was promoted as Team Jewels vs. Team Date.

Main event
Weight class				Method	Round	Time	Notes
Atomweight	Naho Sugiyama	def.	Mina Kurobe	Decision (unanimous)	3	5:00
Atomweight	Emi Tomimatsu	def.	Satomi Takano	Decision (split)	3	5:00
Strawweight	Emi Fujino	def.	Nori Date	Decision (unanimous)	3	5:00
Atomweight	Hana Date	def.	Pan Hui	Decision (unanimous)	2	5:00
Strawweight	Sachiko Fujimori	def.	Karei Date	TKO (punches)	1	1:37

== Deep Jewels 11 ==
Deep Jewels 11
- Promotion: Deep
- Date: March 5, 2016
- Venue: Shinjuku Face
- City: Tokyo, Japan

Event chronology
Deep Jewels 10	Deep Jewels 11	Deep Jewels 12

Deep Jewels 11 was an MMA event of the Deep Jewels brand held by the Japanese promotion Deep. The event took place on March 5, 2016 at Shinjuku Face in Tokyo, Japan.

Main event
Weight class				Method	Round	Time	Notes
Atomweight	Emi Tomimatsu	def.	Saori Ishioka	Submission (rear naked choke)	2	4:49
Strawweight	Mizuki Inoue	def.	Nori Date	Submission (armbar)	1	3:12
Atomweight	Mina Kurobe	def.	Hana Date	Decision (unanimous)	2	5:00
Atomweight	Pan Hui	def.	Real Date	Decision (unanimous)	2	5:00

== Deep Jewels 12 ==
Deep Jewels 12
- Promotion: Deep
- Date: June 5, 2016
- Venue: Shinjuku Face
- City: Tokyo, Japan

Event chronology
Deep Jewels 11	Deep Jewels 12	Deep Jewels 13

Deep Jewels 12 was an MMA event of the Deep Jewels brand held by the Japanese promotion Deep. The event took place on June 5, 2016 at Shinjuku Face in Tokyo, Japan.

Main event
Weight class				Method	Round	Time	Notes
Atomweight	Naho Sugiyama	def.	Emi Tomimatsu	Decision (unanimous)	3	5:00	(Note: Vacant Atomweight Championship bout)
Atomweight	Saori Ishioka	def.	Hana Date	Submission (armbar)	1	4:39
54kg Catchweight	Nori Date	def.	Yuko Oya	Decision (unanimous)	2	5:00
Atomweight	Mina Kurobe	def.	Ranju Date	TKO	1	1:29
Strawweight	Tomo Maesawa	def.	Karei Date	TKO	1	2:03
Atomweight	Yuko Kiryu	def.	Real Date	Decision (unanimous)	2	5:00
Atomweight	Karen Date	def.	Ayumi Misaka	TKO	2	2:56

== Deep Jewels 13 ==
Deep Jewels 13
- Promotion: Deep
- Date: August 27, 2016
- Venue: Differ Ariake
- City: Tokyo, Japan

Event chronology
Deep Jewels 12	Deep Jewels 13	Deep Jewels 13

Deep Jewels 13 was an MMA event of the Deep Jewels brand held by the Japanese promotion Deep. The event took place on August 27, 2016 at Differ Ariake in Tokyo, Japan. The main event featured Mika Nagano coming out of a 3-year retirement.

Main event
Weight class				Method	Round	Time	Notes
Strawweight	Mika Nagano	def.	Sachiko Fujimori	Technical submission (armbar)	3	2:34
Atomweight	Mina Kurobe	def.	Tomo Maesawa	Decision (unanimous)	2	5:00
Atomweight	Kanna Asakura	def.	Yoon Ha Hong	Decision (unanimous)	2	5:00
54kg Catchweight	Tanja Hoffmann	def.	Daichi Date	Decision (unanimous)	2	5:00
Atomweight	Pan Hui	def.	Yuko Kiryu	Decision (unanimous)	2	5:00
57kg Catchweight	Yukinari Nabekawa	def.	Nao Date	Decision (unanimous)	2	5:00

== Deep Jewels 14 ==
Deep Jewels 14
- Promotion: Deep
- Date: November 2, 2016
- Venue: Shinjuku FACE
- City: Tokyo, Japan

Event chronology
Deep Jewels 13	Deep Jewels 14	Deep Jewels 15

Deep Jewels 14 was an MMA event of the Deep Jewels brand held by the Japanese promotion Deep. The event took place on November 2, 2016 at Shinjuku FACE in Tokyo, Japan.

Main event
Weight class				Method	Round	Time	Notes
Atomweight	Mina Kurobe	def.	Saori Ishioka	Decision (unanimous)	3	5:00
Atomweight	Tomo Maesawa	def.	Emi Tomimatsu	Submission (rear naked choke)	3	1:26
Flyweight	Emiko Raika	def.	Jin Hee Kang	Decision (unanimous)	2	5:00
Strawweight	Miura Ayaka	def.	Sachiko Fujimori	Submission (scarf hold armlock)	2	0:35
Atomweight	Satomi Takano	def.	Miyuki Furusawa	Submission (technical armbar)	1	3:53
Flyweight	Nori Date	def.	Takako Lizuka	KO/TKO (head kick & punches)	1	0:48
Atomweight	Hana Date	def.	Yukari Yamaguchi	Decision (unanimous)	2	5:00
Welterweight	Reina Miura	def.	Eriko	Submission (technical armbar)	1	1:57

== Deep Jewels 15 ==
Deep Jewels 15
- Promotion: Deep
- Date: February 25, 2017
- Venue: Shinjuku FACE
- City: Tokyo, Japan

Event chronology
Deep Jewels 14	Deep Jewels 15	Deep Jewels 16

Deep Jewels 15 was an MMA event of the Deep Jewels brand held by the Japanese promotion Deep. The event took place on February 25, 2017 at Shinjuku FACE in Tokyo, Japan.

Main event
Weight class				Method	Round	Time	Notes
Atomweight	Mina Kurobe	def.	Naho Sugiyama (c)	Decision (unanimous)	3	5:00	(Note: Atomweight Championship bout)
130 lbs catchweight	Shizuka Sugiyama	def.	Yukinari Nabekawa	Decision (split)	2	5:00
Flyweight	Emiko Raika	def.	Karate Komachi	Decision (unanimous)	2	5:00
Atomweight	Kanna Asakura	def.	Natsuki Shimomakise	Submission (rear-naked choke)	1	2:28
Lightweight	Reina Miura	def.	Shayna Baszler	Decision (unanimous)	2	5:00
Atomweight	Emi Tomimatsu	def.	Pan Hui	Decision (unanimous)	2	5:00
Atomweight	Satomi Takano	def.	Ye Jin Jung	Submission (guillotine choke)	1	0:39

== Deep Jewels 16 ==
Deep Jewels 16
- Promotion: Deep
- Date: May 20, 2017
- Venue: Shinjuku FACE
- City: Tokyo, Japan

Event chronology
Deep Jewels 15	Deep Jewels 16	Deep Jewels 17

Deep Jewels 16 was an MMA event of the Deep Jewels brand held by the Japanese promotion Deep. The event took place on May 20, 2017 at Shinjuku FACE in Tokyo, Japan.

Main event
Weight class				Method	Round	Time	Notes
Lightweight	Reina Miura	def.	Kristin Handel	KO/TKO (punches from mount)	1	4:24
Atomweight	Satomi Takano	def.	Tomo Maesawa	KO/TKO (referee stoppage)	2	4:42
Atomweight	Yuko Kiryu	def.	Natsuki Shimomakise	Submission (armbar)	1	2:34
Atomweight	Pan Hui	def.	Kyu Kitano	Decision (unanimous)	2	5:00
Atomweight	Mizuki Furuse	def.	Madoka Ishibashi	KO/TKO (left head kick)	1	1:59

== Deep Jewels 17 ==
Deep Jewels 17
- Promotion: Deep
- Date: August 26, 2017
- Venue: Shinjuku FACE
- City: Tokyo, Japan

Event chronology
Deep Jewels 16	Deep Jewels 17	Deep Jewls 18

Deep Jewels 17 was an MMA event of the Deep Jewels brand held by the Japanese promotion Deep. The event took place on August 26, 2017 at Shinjuku FACE in Tokyo, Japan.

Main event
Weight class				Method	Round	Time	Notes
Atomweight	Kanna Asakura	def.	Saori Ishioka	Decision (unanimous)	3	5:00	(Note: Qualification for 2017 Rizin Super Atomweight Grand Prix)
Atomweight	Emi Tomimatsu	def.	Satomi Takano	Decision (split)	2	5:00
Flyweight	Shizuka Sugiyama	def.	Satsuki Kodama	Submission (armbar)	1	4:58
Atomweight	Yuko Saito	def.	Mizuki Furuse	KO/TKO (punches)	1	3:38

== Deep Jewels 18 ==
Deep Jewels 18
- Promotion: Deep
- Date: December 2, 2017
- Venue: Shinjuku FACE
- City: Tokyo, Japan

Event chronology
Deep Jewels 17	Deep Jewels 18	Deep Jewels 19

Deep Jewels 18 was an MMA event of the Deep Jewels brand held by the Japanese promotion Deep. The event took place on December 2, 2017 at Shinjuku FACE in Tokyo, Japan.

Main event
Weight class				Method	Round	Time	Notes
Atomweight	Satomi Takano	def.	Tomo Maesawa	Decision (unanimous)	3	5:00
Flyweight	Yukari Nabe	def.	Yurika Nakakura	KO/TKO (pound from mount)	2	2:50
Atomweight	Kyu Kitano	def.	Yuko Kiryu	Decision (majority)	2	5;00
Flyweight	Kana Watanabe	def.	Hikari Sato	Submission (armbar)	2	1:32
Atomweight	Emi Sato	def.	Hikaru Aono	Submission (armbar)	2	1:43
Atomweight	Nanaka Kawamura	def.	REICA	Decision (unanimous)	2	3:00
Strawweight	Yuko Saito	def.	Mika Nagano	Decision (unanimous)	2	3:00	(Note: Grappling match)
Atomweight	Mika Arai	def.	Mizuki Furuse	KO/TKO (pound from mount)	2	2:17
Flyweight	Ayako Miyata	def.	Sayuri Yamaguchi	Submission (triangle choke)	1	3:54
Atomweight	Tomomi Souda	def.	Madoka Ishibashi	Submission (sleeper choke)	2	3:03

== Deep Jewels 19 ==
Deep Jewels 19
- Promotion: Deep
- Date: March 10, 2018
- Venue: Shinjuku FACE
- City: Tokyo, Japan

Event chronology
Deep Jewels 18	Deep Jewels 19	Deep Jewels 20

Deep Jewels 19 was an MMA event of the Deep Jewels brand held by the Japanese promotion Deep. The event took place on March 10, 2018 at Shinjuku FACE in Tokyo, Japan.

Main event
Weight class				Method	Round	Time	Notes
Atomweight	Mina Kurobe (c)	def.	Satomi Takano	Decision (unanimous)	3	5:00	(Note: Atomweight Championship bout)
Lightweight	Reina Miura	def.	Soyoung Park	Submission (V1 arm lock)	1	1:30
Flyweight	Yukari Nabe	vs.	Kana Watanabe	Draw (majority)	2	5:00
Atomweight	Tomo Maesawa	def.	Yuko Saito	Decision (unanimous)	2	5:00
Flyweight	Yuko Oya	def.	Hikari Sato	Decision (majority)	2	5:00
Atomweight	Yuko Kiryu	def.	Tomomi Souda	Submission (armbar)	1	4:40
Atomweight	Mizuki Furuse	def.	Nanaka Kawamura	Decision (majority)	2	5:00
110 lbs Catchweight	Mika Arai	def.	Pan Hui	Decision (unanimous)	2	5:00
Atomweight	Hikaru Aono	def.	Anna Kiriyama	Decision (unanimous)	2	5:00

== Deep Jewels 20 ==
Deep Jewels 20
- Promotion: Deep
- Date: June 9, 2018
- Venue: Shinjuku FACE
- City: Tokyo, Japan

Event chronology
Deep Jewels 19	Deep Jewels 20	Deep Jewels 21

Deep Jewels 20 was an MMA event of the Deep Jewels brand held by the Japanese promotion Deep. The event took place on June 9, 2018 at Shinjuku FACE in Tokyo, Japan.

Main event
Weight class				Method	Round	Time	Notes
Atomweight	Jeong Eun Park	def.	Emi Tomimatsu	Decision (unanimous)	3	5:00
Featherweight	Reina Miura	def.	Eun Ji Choi	Submission (sleeper choke)	1	1:40
Flyweight	Kana Watanabe	def.	Yukari Nabe	Decision (majority)	3	5:00
Flyweight	Shizuka Sugiyama	def.	Sachiko Fujimori	Decision (unanimous)	3	5:00
Atomweight	Hikaru Aono	def.	Mizuki Furuse	Decision (unanimous)	2	5:00
Atomweight	Nanaka Kawamura	def.	Momoko Yamazaki	KO/TKO (punches to the body)	1	0:39
Strawweight	Yuko Saito	def.	Izumi Noguchi	Decision (unanimous)	2	5:00
Strawweight	Mao Sakai	def.	Ayako Miyata	Decision (unanimous)	2	5:00

== Deep Jewels 21 ==
Deep Jewels 21
- Promotion: Deep
- Date: September 16, 2018
- Venue: Shinjuku FACE
- City: Tokyo, Japan

Event chronology
Deep Jewels 20	Deep Jewels 21	Deep Jewels 22

Deep Jewels 21 was an MMA event of the Deep Jewels brand held by the Japanese promotion Deep. The event took place on September 16, 2018 at Shinjuku FACE in Tokyo, Japan.

Main event
Weight class				Method	Round	Time	Notes
Atomweight	Tomo Maesawa	def.	Jeong Eun Park	Decision (unanimous)	3	5:00
Flyweight	Satsuki Kodama	def.	Hikari Sato	KO/TKO (left straight)	2	1:41
Strawweight	Mika Nagano	def.	Izumi Noguchi	Submission (armbar)	1	4:02
Flyweight	Yukari Nabe	def.	Yuko Oya	Decision (unanimous)	2	5:00
Atomweight	Yuko Suzuki	def.	Nanaka Kawamura	Submission (sleeper choke)	1	3:23
Atomweight	Hikaru Aono	def.	Mika Arai	Decision (unanimous)	2	5:00
Atomweight	Emi Sato	def.	Mizuki Furuse	Submission (double wristlock)	1	1:09
Atomweight	Madoka Ishibashi	def.	Ai Takei	Submission (rear naked choke)	1	4:30
Strawweight	Sayuri Yamaguchi	def.	Mao Sakai	Decision (unanimous)	2	5:00

== Deep Jewels 22 ==
Deep Jewels 22
- Promotion: Deep
- Date: December 1, 2018
- Venue: Shinjuku FACE
- City: Tokyo, Japan

Event chronology
Deep Jewels 21	Deep Jewels 22	Deep Jewels 23

Deep Jewels 22 was an MMA event of the Deep Jewels brand held by the Japanese promotion Deep. The event took place on December 1, 2018 at Shinjuku FACE in Tokyo, Japan.

Main event
Weight class				Method	Round	Time	Notes
Atomweight	Tomo Maesawa	def.	Mina Kurobe (c)	Decision (split)	3	5:00	(Note: Atomweight Championship bout)
Featherweight	Reina Miura	def.	Judith Ruis	Decision (unanimous)	3	5:00
Atomweight	Satomi Takano	def.	Yuko Saito	Decision (unanimous)	3	5:00
Strawweight	Mika Nagano	vs.	Tanja Hoffman	Draw (majority)	2	5:00
Flyweight	Yukari Nabe	def.	Takamori Ibu	Decision (unanimous)	2	5:00
Strawweight	Sayuri Yamaguchi	def.	Yuko Suzuki	Decision (unanimous)	2	5:00
Atomweight	Nanaka Kawamura	def.	Tomomi Souda	Decision (unanimous)	2	5:00
Strawweight	Asami Nakai	def.	Izumi Noguchi	Decision (unanimous)	2	5:00

== Deep Jewels 23 ==
Deep Jewels 23
- Promotion: Deep
- Date: March 8, 2019
- Venue: Shinjuku FACE
- City: Tokyo, Japan

Event chronology
Deep Jewels 22	Deep Jewels 23	Deep Jewels 24

Deep Jewels 23 was an MMA event of the Deep Jewels brand held by the Japanese promotion Deep. The event took place on March 8, 2019 at Shinjuku FACE in Tokyo, Japan.

Main event
Weight class				Method	Round	Time	Notes
49kg	Kanna Asakura	def.	Tomo Maesawa	Decision (unanimous)	3	5:00	(Note: Elbows Allowed)
68kg	Reina Miura	def.	Mao Ueda	KO/TKO (punches)	1	0:25	(Note: Elbows Allowed)
Flyweight	Kana Watanabe	def.	Soo Min Kang	KO/TKO (punches from crucifix)	1	4:33
Atomweight	Emi Tomimatsu	def.	Hikaru Aono	Submission (Rear Naked choke)	2	4:44
Atomweight	Suwanan Boonsorn	def.	Emi Sato	Submission (Rear Naked Choke)	1	0:33
55kg	Yukari Nabe	def.	Sachiko Fujimori	Submission (Rear Naked Choke)	2	2:42
55kg	Asami Nakai	def.	Yuko Oya	Decision (unanimous)	2	5:00
Microweight	Yasuko Tamada	def.	Madoka Ishibashi	Decision (unanimous)	2	5:00
49kg	Ai Shimizu	def.	Sae Kokuho	KO/TKO (ground punches)	1	1:08
Atomweight	Kotori Tamiya	def.	Mizuki Oshiro	Decision (majority)	2	5:00
Flyweight	Mikiko Shumizu	def	Shoko Fujita	Unanimous Decision	2	3:00	(Note: Amateur Rules)

== Deep Jewels 24 ==
Deep Jewels 24
- Promotion: Deep
- Date: June 9, 2019
- Venue: Shinjuku FACE
- City: Tokyo, Japan

Event chronology
Deep Jewels 23	Deep Jewels 24	Deep Jewels 25

Deep Jewels 24 was an MMA event of the Deep Jewels brand held by the Japanese promotion Deep. The event took place on June 9, 2019 at Shinjuku FACE in Tokyo, Japan.

Main event
Weight class				Method	Round	Time	Notes
58kg	Rin Nakai	def.	Geochan The Rocket	KO/TKO (ground & pound)	2	1:56	(Note: Elbows Allowed)
49kg	Emi Tomimatsu	def.	Mizuki Furuse	Submission (double wristlock)	1	4:28	(Note: Elbows Allowed)
Strawweight	Miki Motono	def.	Mika Nagano	Decision (unanimous)	2	5:00
Atomweight	Hikaru Aono	def.	Mikiko Hiyama	Submission (armbar)	2	2:36
51kg	Mao Sakai	def.	Nanaka Kawamura	Decision (unanimous)	2	5:00
Microweight	Momoko Yamazaki	def.	Ai Takei	Decision (unanimous)	2	5:00
Strawweight	Izumi Noguchi	def.	Ayako Miyata	Decision (unanimous)	2	5:00
Bantamweight	Shoko Fujita	def.	Lori Jesekel	Decision (unanimous)	2	5:00	(Note: Amateur Kickboxing Rules)
49kg	Otoha Nagao	def.	Sae Kokuho	Decision (unanimous)	2	5:00
Strawweight	Ai Shimizu	def.	Sayuri Yamaguchi	Submission (rear naked choke)	2	2:45

== Deep Jewels 25 ==
Deep Jewels 25
- Promotion: Deep
- Date: September 1, 2019
- Venue: Shinjuku FACE
- City: Tokyo, Japan

Event chronology
Deep Jewels 24	Deep Jewels 25	Deep Jewels 26

Deep Jewels 25 was an MMA Event of the Deep Jewels Brand held by the Japanese Promotion Deep. The event took place on September 1, 2019, at Shinjuku FACE in Tokyo, Japan

Main Event
Weight class				Method	Round	Time	Notes
Flyweight	Shizuka Sugiyama	def	Asami Nakai	Submission (Armbar)	2	4:04
Atomweight	Hikaru Aono	def	Miyuki Furusawa	Submission (Arm-Triangle Choke)	2	3:53
Microweight	Mizuki Oshiro	def	Momoko Yamazaki	TKO (Referee Stoppage)	2	0:58
Featherweight	Mao Ueda	def	Mayumi Aoki	TKO (Punches)	1	3:43
51kg	Pan Hui	def	Izumi Noguchi	Decision (Unanimous)	3	3:00	(Note: Kickboxing Rules)
55kg	Tomoko Inoue	def	Shoko Fujita	Decision (Unanimous)	2	3:00	(Note: Amateur MMA Rules)
49kg	Rion Noda	def	Otoha Nagao	Decision (Split)	2	5:00

== Deep Jewels 26 ==
Deep Jewels 26
- Promotion: Deep
- Date: October 22, 2019
- Venue: Korakuen Hall
- City: Tokyo, Japan

Event chronology
Deep Jewels 25	Deep Jewels 26	Deep Jewels 27

Deep Jewels 26 was an MMA Event of the Deep Jewels Brand held by the Japanese Promotion Deep. The event took place on October 22, 2019, at Korakuen Hall in Tokyo, Japan

Main Event
Weight class				Method	Round	Time	Notes
Atomweight	Tomo Maesawa (c)	def	Emi Tomimatsu	Decision (Unanimous)	3	5:00	(Note: Atomweight Championship bout)
63kg	Rin Nakai	def	Diamond Rose The Rocket	Submission (Armbar)	1	3:20
Flyweight	Kana Watanabe	def	Hee Eun Kang	Submission (Rear Naked Choke)	1	1:48
Atomweight	Suwanan Boonsorn	def	Yoon Ha Hong	Submission (Armbar)	1	1:37
Flyweight	Yukari Nabe	def	Geochai The Rocket	TKO (Punches)	1	3:15
Atomweight	Jeong Eun Park	def	Emi Sato	TKO (Punches)	1	2:36
49kg	Mizuki Furuse	def	Pan Hui	Decision (Split)	2	5:00
49kg	Ohata Nagao	def	Nanaka Kawamura	Decision (Unanimous)	2	5:00
Minimumweight	Yasuko Tamada	def	Kotori Tamiya	Decision (Unanimous)	2	5:00

== Deep Jewels 27 ==
Deep Jewels 27
- Promotion: Deep
- Date: December 22, 2019
- Venue: Abeno Activity Center
- City: Osaka, Japan

Event chronology
Deep Jewels 26	Deep Jewels 27	Deep Jewels 28

Deep Jewels 27 was an MMA Event of the Deep Jewels Brand held by the Japanese Promotion Deep. The event took place on December 22, 2019, at Abeno Activity Center in Osaka, Japan

Main Event
Weight class				Method	Round	Time	Notes
54kg	Asami Nakai	def	Si Yoon Park	Decision (Unanimous)	3	5:00
47.5kg	Lommanee Sor. Tehiran	vs.	Momoka Mandokoro	Draw (Majority)	3	3:00	(Note: Kickboxing Rules)
49kg	Mizuki Furuse	def	Panna Cotta Minori	Submission (Rear Naked Choke)	1	1:28
Featherweight	Kano Kagaya	def	Mao Ueda	Decision (Split)	2	5:00
52kg	Seina	def	Kurumi	TKO (3 Knockdowns)	1	1:29	(Note: Kickboxing Rules)
55kg	Aoi Kuriyama	def	Chisato Wada	Decision (Unanimous)	2	5:00
45kg	Moe Sasaki	def	Harumi Arima	Decision (Unanimous)	2	3:00	(Note: Amateur Rules)
Strawweight	Akan Jinno	def	Hitomi Ikemoto	Decision (Split)	2	3:00	(Note: Amateur Rules)
45kg	Raika Nagasaki	def	Ayame Fuki	Decision (Unanimous)	2	2:00	(Note: Amateur Kickboxing Rules)
54kg	Mayu Kawanishi	def	Namiko Kawabata	Submission (Rear Naked Choke)	1	0:47	(Note: Amateur Rules)
46kg	Moeri Suda	def	Akari Kamise	Decision (Unanimous)	1	5:00	(Note: Amateur Grappling Rules)
45kg	Raika Kamimura	def	Manaka Shimizu	Decision (Unanimous)	2	2:00	(Note: Amateur Kickboxing Rules)

== Deep Jewels 28 ==
Deep Jewels 28
- Promotion: Deep
- Date: February 24, 2020
- Venue: New Pier Hall
- City: Tokyo, Japan

Event chronology
Deep Jewels 27	Deep Jewels 28	Deep Jewels 29

Deep Jewels 28 was an MMA Event of the Deep Jewels Brand held by the Japanese Promotion Deep. The event took place on February 24, 2020, at New Pier Hall in Tokyo, Japan.

Main Event
Weight class				Method	Round	Time	Notes
Featherweight	Reina Miura	def	Andre The Rocket	TKO (Punches)	1	3:29
44.5	Suwanan Boonsorn	def	Emi Sato	Submission (Armbar)	1	0:49	(Note: Microweight Tournament 1st Round)
44.5	Mizuki Furuse	def	Yasuko Tamada	Decision (Unanimous)	2	5:00	(Note: Microweight Tournament 1st Round)
Strawweight	Miki Motono	def	Nongpang The Rocket	TKO (Punches)	1	4:27
49kg	Nanaka Kawamura	def	Mika Sakamoto	TKO (Punches)	1	2:56
49kg	Sakura Mori	def	Otoha Nagao	Decision (Unanimous)	2	5:00
Strawweight	Chisato Wada	def	Tomoko Inoue	TKO (Punch)	1	1:06
44.5kg	Moe Sasaki	def	Sae Kokuho	Decision (Unanimous)	2	5:00	(Note: For Microweight Tournament Reserve)

== Deep Jewels 29 ==
Deep Jewels 29
- Promotion: Deep
- Date: July 23, 2020
- Venue: Shinjuku FACE
- City: Tokyo, Japan

Event chronology
Deep Jewels 28	Deep Jewels 29	Deep Jewels 30

Deep Jewels 29 is an MMA Event of the Deep Jewels Brand held by the Japanese Promotion Deep. The event was scheduled to take place on May 6, 2020, at Korakuen Hall in Tokyo, Japan. However, due to the COVID-19 pandemic the event was postponed and rescheduled to July 23, 2020, at Shinjuku FACE in Tokyo, Japan

Main Event
Weight class				Method	Round	Time	Notes
Strawweight	Miki Motono	def	Asami Nakai	TKO	1	4:23	(Note: For The Interim Strawweight Title)
61kg	Shizuka Sugiyama	def	Mika Arai	Submission (Armbar)	3	1:49
Atomweight	Ayaka Hamasaki	def	Tomo Maesawa	Submission (Armbar)	1	6:42	(Note: Part of A Tag Match Also Featuring Emi Tomimatsu & Mizuki Furuse)
Atomweight	Ayaka Hamasaki	def	Mizuki Furuse	Submission (Armbar)	1	1:10	(Note: Part of A Tag Match Also Featuring Emi Tomimatsu & Tomo Maesawa)
49kg	Hikaru Aono	def	Rion Noda	TKO	1	4:53
49kg	Saori Oshima	def	Sakura Mori	Submission (Kimura Lock)	2	2:10
49kg	Ohata Nagao	def	Pan Hui	Split Decision	2	5:00
52kg	Yuri Takeda	def	Aya Murakami	Unanimous Decision	2	3:00	(Note: Amateur Rules)
49kg	Moeri Suda	def	Motoko Tashiro	Submission (Armbar)	1	3:00	(Note: Amateur Rules)

== Deep Jewels 30 ==
Deep Jewels 30
- Promotion: Deep
- Date: October 31. 2020
- Venue: New Pier Hall
- City: Tokyo. Japan

Event chronology
Deep Jewels 29	Deep Jewels 30	Deep Jewels 31

Deep Jewels 30 was an MMA Event of the Deep Jewels Brand held by the Japanese Promotion Deep. The event took place on October 31, 2020, at New Pier Hall in Tokyo, Japan. The event marked the final fight of then champion Tomo Maesawa. Rion Noda was originally scheduled to face Moeri Suda, however was injured while training for the fight and was replaced by the debuting Aya Murakami.

Main Event
Weight class				Method	Round	Time	Notes
Atomweight	Tomo Maesawa	def	Hikaru Aono	Submission (Front Choke)	3	0:57	(Note: For The Atomweight Championship)
Flyweight	Aoi Kuriyama	def	Yuko Oya	Decision (Unanimous)	2	5:00
49kg	Sakura Mori	def	Pan Hui	Submission (Rear Naked Choke)	1	4:40
Microweight	Momoko Yamazaki	def	Sae Kokuho	Decision (Unanimous)	2	5:00
54.5kg	Seika Izawa	def	Mika Arai	Decision (Unanimous)	2	5:00
49kg	Aya Murakami	def	Moeri Suda	Decision (Unanimous)	2	5:00
58kg	Mikiko Shimizu	def	Yurina Horiguchi	TKO (Ground Punches)	2	2:51
Flyweight	Shoko Fujita	def	Kate Oyama	Decision (Unanimous)	2	3:00	(Note: Semi Pro Rules)

== Deep Jewels 31 ==
Deep Jewels 31
- Promotion: Deep
- Date: December 19th, 2020
- Venue: Shinjuku FACE
- City: Tokyo, Japan

Event chronology
Deep Jewels 30	Deep Jewels 31	Deep Jewels 32

Deep Jewels 31 was an MMA Event of the Deep Jewels Brand held by the Japanese Promotion Deep. It took place on December 19, 2020, at Shinjuku FACE in Tokyo, Japan

Main Event
Weight class				Method	Round	Time	Notes
Atomweight	Si Woo Park	def	Saori Oshima	Decision (Unanimous)	5	3:00
Strawweight	Seika Izawa	def	Miki Motono	Decision (Unanimous)	5	3:00
Flyweight	Kate Oyama	def	Marina Kumagai	Submission (Armbar)	1	4:33
Flyweight	Mikiko Shimizu	def	Mika Arai	Decision (Unanimous)	2	5:00
49kg	Ohtoa Nagao	def	Mika Sakamoto	Decision (Unanimous)	2	5:00
Strawweight	Ayaka Wantanabe	def	Akari Jinno	TKO (Ref Stoppage)	1	4:56
Atomweight	Moe Sasaki	def	Moeri Suda	Decision (Unanimous)	2	5:00
53kg	Eru Takebayashi	def	Saki	Submission (Armbar)	2	1:16	(Note: Semi Professional Rules)

== Deep Jewels 32 ==
Deep Jewels 32
- Promotion: Deep
- Date: March 7th, 2021
- Venue: Korakuen Hall
- City: Tokyo, Japan

Event chronology
Deep Jewels 31	Deep Jewels 32	Deep Jewels 33

Deep Jewels 32 was an MMA Event of the Deep Jewels Brand held by the Japanese Promotion Deep. It took place on March 7, 2021, at Korakuen Hall in Tokyo, Japan.

Main Event
Weight class				Method	Round	Time	Notes
Atomweight	Saori Oshima	def	Emi Tomimatsu	Submission (Armlock)	1	0:45	(Note: Atomweight Grand Prix 1st Round)
Atomweight	Si Woo Park	def	Mizuki Oshiro	Decision (Unanimous)	2	5:00	(Note: Atomweight Grand Prix 1st Round)
Atomweight	Aya Murakami	def	Sakura Mori	Decision (Unanimous)	2	5:00	(Note: Atomweight Grand Prix 1st Round)
Atomweight	Hikaru Aono	Def	Emi Sato	Decision (Unanimous)	2	5:00	(Note: Atomweight Grand Prix 1st Round)
54kg	Seika Izawa	def	Megumi Sugimoto	Submission (Rear Naked Choke)	1	0:59	(Note: Grappling Rules)
Flyweight	Yukari Nabe	def	Mikiko Shimizu	Decision (Unanimous)	2	5:00
Strawweight	Shoko Fujita	def	Yuko Oya	Decision (Unanimous)	2	5:00
55kg	Namiko Kawabata	def	Kate Oyama	Decision (Unanimous)	2	5:00
51kg	Karin Horii	def	Momoka Yoshikawa	Decision (Split)	2	3:00	(Note: Semi Professional Rules)
53kg	Rajina	vs	Sarah	Draw	2	1:30	(Note: Amateur Kickboxing Rules)

== Deep Jewels 33 ==
Deep Jewels 33
- Promotion: Deep
- Date: June 19, 2021
- Venue: Korakuen Hall
- City: Tokyo, Japan

Event chronology
Deep Jewels 32	Deep Jewels 33

Deep Jewels 33 also known as DEEP JEWELS 33 - Atomweight GP2021 FINAL was an MMA event of the DEEP JEWELS brand held by the Japanese Promotion Deep. It was initially scheduled to take place on May 5, 2021, at Korakuen Hall in Tokyo, Japan. However, due to the state of emergency caused by the COVID-19 situation in Tokyo, the event was postponed and is now scheduled to take place on June 20, 2021.

On May 5, it was announced that Aya Murakami had to pull out of the Atomweight Grand Prix tournament as a result of an illness that hospitalized her, As a result of this, Murakami's opponent from the 1st round Mizuki Oshiro was announced as Hikaru Aono's Replacement Opponent. This also resulted in the reserve fight between Oshiro and Eru Tomimatsu being cancelled.

=== Fight Card ===
Deep Jewels 33
Weight Class				Method	Round	T.Time	Notes
Atomweight 47.6 kg	(Japan) Saori Oshima	def.	(Japan) Hikaru Aono	Decision (Unanimous)	2	5:00	For the vacant DEEP JEWELS Atomweight Championship
Strawweight 52 kg	(Japan) Seika Izawa	def.	(Japan) Miki Motono	Submission (Armbar)	1	3:32	For the vacant DEEP JEWELS Strawweight Championship
Flyweight 57 kg	(Japan) Yukari Nabe	def.	(Japan) Mika Arai	Decision (Unanimous)	2	5:00	
Strawweight 52 kg	(Japan) Namiko Kawabata	def.	(Japan) Shoko Fujita	Decision (Unanimous)	2	5:00	
Catchweight 50 kg	(Japan) Eru Takebayashi	def.	(Japan) Otoha Nagao	Decision (Unanimous)	2	5:00	
Lightweight 70 kg	(Japan) Sayaka Hishinuma	def.	(Japan) Yuko Matsuura	TKO (Ground and pound)	2	1:31	
Atomweight 47.6 kg	(Japan) Hikaru Aono	def.	(Japan) Mizuki Oshiro	Submission (Armbar)	1	1:38	Atomweight Grand Prix Semifinal
Atomweight 47.6 kg	(Japan) Saori Oshima	def.	(South Korea) Si Woo Park	Submission (Armbar)	1	2:28	Atomweight Grand Prix Semifinal

== Deep Jewels 34 ==
Deep Jewels 34
- Promotion: Deep
- Date: September 4, 2021
- Venue: Shinjuku Face
- City: Tokyo, Japan

Event chronology
Deep Jewels 33	Deep Jewels 34

Deep Jewels 34 was an MMA event of the DEEP JEWELS brand held by the Japanese Promotion Deep, held on September 4, 2021.

=== Background ===
An atomweight bout between Mizuki Oshiro and Mizuki Furuse was scheduled as the event headliner.

A flyweight bout between Mikiko Shimizu and Kate Oyama was announced for the event.

Two fights were added to the card on July 12: Tae Murayama was scheduled to face Yuko Matsuura at lightweight, while Aya Murakami was scheduled to face Kyoka at microweight.

Eru Takebayashi was scheduled to meet fellow prospect Tomoko Inoue in a strawweight bout.

A tag team grappling match featuring Hikaru Aono, Emi Tomimatsu, Seika Izawa and Mika Nagano was announced for the event. The two-person teams decided in a draw made on the day.

An amateur flyweight kickboxing bout between Saki Namakura and Miyu Yamamoto was scheduled as the opening fight of the card.

=== Fight card ===
Deep Jewels 34
Weight Class				Method	Round	T.Time	Notes
Atomweight 47.6 kg	(Japan) Mizuki Oshiro	def.	(Japan) Mizuki Furuse	KO/TKO (referee stoppage)	2	4:13	
Flyweight 57 kg	(Japan) Mikiko Shimizu	def.	(Japan) Kate Oyama	Decision (unanimous)	2	5:00	
Grappling Bout	(Japan) Seika Izawa	def.	(Japan) Mika Nagano	Submission (heel hook)	1	0:50	
Grappling Bout	(Japan) Seika Izawa	def.	(Japan) Emi Tomimatsu	Submission (armbar)	1	3:51	
Strawweight 52 kg	(Japan) Eru Takebayashi	def.	(Japan) Tomoko Inoue	Decision (unanimous)	2	5:00	
Microweight 44 kg	(Japan) Aya Murakami	def.	(Japan) Kyoka Minagawa	Submission (armbar)	1	4:16	
Lightweight 70 kg	(Japan) Tae Murayama	def.	(Japan) Yuko Matsuura	Decision (unanimous)	2	5:00	
Flyweight 57 kg	(Japan) Saki Nakamura	def.	(Japan) Miyu Yamamoto	Decision (unanimous)			Amateur kickboxing rules.

== Deep Jewels 35 ==
Deep Jewels 35
- Promotion: Deep
- Date: December 11, 2021
- Venue: New Pier Hall
- City: Tokyo, Japan

Event chronology
Deep Jewels 34	Deep Jewels 35

Deep Jewels 35 was an MMA event of the DEEP JEWELS brand held by the Japanese Promotion Deep, held on December 11, 2021.

=== Background ===
The event was headlined by a strawweight bout between Miki Motono and Namiko Kawabata. A flyweight bout between Aoi Kuriyama and Kate Oyama was scheduled as the co-main event.

=== Fight card ===
Deep Jewels 35
Weight Class				Method	Round	T.Time	Notes
Strawweight 52 kg	(Japan) Miki Motono	def.	(Japan) Namiko Kawabata	Decision (unanimous)	2	5:00	
Flyweight 57 kg	(Japan) Kate Oyama	def.	(Japan) Aoi Kuriyama	Decision (unanimous)	2	5:00	
Featherweight 66 kg	(Japan) Reina Miura	def.	(Japan) Tae Murayama	Submission (armbar)	1	4:55	
Catchweight 43 kg	(Japan) Aya Murakami	def.	(Japan) Mizuki Furuse	Submission (armbar)	1	4:58	
Strawweight 52 kg	(Japan) Yuko Suzuki	def.	(Japan) Tomoko Inoue	Decision (unanimous)	2	5:00	
Catchweight 58 kg	(Japan) Shoko Fujita	def.	(Japan) Yurina Horiguchi	Decision (unanimous)	2	5:00	
Atomweight 47.6 kg	(Japan) Otoha Nagao	vs.	(Japan) Haruka Yamaguchi	Draw (majority)	3	3:00	Kickboxing rules.
Catchweight 68 kg	(Japan) Marina Kumagai	def.	(Japan) Yuko Matsuura	Decision (unanimous)	2	5:00	
Flyweight 57 kg	(Japan) Kano Kagaya	vs.	(Japan) Hanako Sawa	Draw (unanimous)	2	5:00	
Atomweight 47.6 kg	(Japan) Moeri Suda	def.	(Japan) Eru Takebayashi	Submission (armbar)	1	4:41	
Catchweight 53 kg	(Japan) Rajina	def.	(Japan) Saki Nakamura	Decision (split)			Kickboxing rules.

== Deep Jewels 36 ==
Deep Jewels 36
- Promotion: Deep
- Date: March 12, 2022
- Venue: New Pier Hall
- City: Tokyo, Japan

Event chronology
Deep Jewels 35	Deep Jewels 36

Deep Jewels 36 was an MMA event of the DEEP JEWELS brand held by the Japanese Promotion Deep, held on March 12, 2022.

=== Background ===
The quarterfinal bouts of the 2022 Deep Jewels flyweight grand prix were scheduled to take place at the event.

=== Fight card ===
Deep Jewels 36
Weight Class				Method	Round	T.Time	Notes
Flyweight 57 kg	(Japan) Rin Nakai	def.	(Japan) Shoko Fujita	TKO (punches)	2	4:38	Flyweight Grand Prix Quarterfinals
Flyweight 57 kg	(Japan) Shizuka Sugiyama	def.	(Japan) Mikiko Shimizu	Decision (split)	2	5:00	Flyweight Grand Prix Quarterfinals
Super Atomweight 49 kg	(Japan) Namiko Kawabata	def.	(Japan) Saori Oshima	Decision (unanimous)	2	5:00	
Super Atomweight 49 kg	(Japan) Miki Motono	def.	(Japan) Mizuki Oshiro	Technical Submission (armbar)	1	4:18	
Super Atomweight 49 kg	(Japan) Moeri Suda	def.	(Japan) Hikaru Aono	Technical Submission (armbar)	1	3:36	
Super Atomweight 49 kg	(Japan) Yuko Kiryu	def.	(Japan) Sadae Numata	Decision (split)	2	5:00	
Microweight 44 kg	(Japan) Mizuki Furuse	def.	(Japan) Reina Kobayashi	Submission (rear-naked choke)	1	2:11	

== Deep Jewels 37 ==
Deep Jewels 37
- Promotion: Deep
- Date: May 8, 2022
- Venue: Korakuen Hall
- City: Tokyo, Japan

Event chronology
Deep Jewels 36	Deep Jewels 37

Deep Jewels 37 was an MMA event of the DEEP JEWELS brand held by the Japanese Promotion Deep, held on May 8, 2022.

=== Background ===
A Jewels Atomweight Championship bout between the champion Saori Oshima and title challenger Moeri Suda was booked for the event.

A DEEP Jewels Featherweight championship bout for the inaugural title between Reina Miura and Yoko Higashi was scheduled for the event.

=== Fight card ===
Deep Jewels 37
Weight Class				Method	Round	T.Time	Notes
Flyweight 57 kg	(Japan) Rin Nakai	def.	(Japan) Shizuka Sugiyama	Technical Submission (armbar)	1	4:53	Flyweight Grand Prix Finals for inaugural Jewels Flyweight Championship
Atomweight 46 kg	(Japan) Saori Oshima (c)	def.	(Japan) Moeri Suda	Technical Submission (kimura)	1	2:58	For the Jewels Atomweight Championship
Featherweight 66 kg	(Japan) Yoko Higashi	def.	(Japan) Reina Miura	Decision (unanimous)	3	5:00	For the inaugural DEEP Jewels Featherweight championship
Strawweight 52 kg	(Japan) Mika Nagano	def.	(Japan) Kate Oyama	Submission (guillotine choke)	2	0:57	
Microweight 44 kg	(Japan) Momoko Yamazaki	def.	(Japan) Kyoka Minagawa	Decision (unanimous)	2	5:00	
Flyweight 57 kg	(Japan) Shizuka Sugiyama	–	(Japan) Aoi Kuriyama	Match cancelled due to Kuriyama missing weight. Sugiyama receives a Bye to the final.			Flyweight Grand Prix Semifinals
Flyweight 57 kg	(Japan) Rin Nakai	def.	(Japan) Tae Murayama	Technical Submission (armbar)	2	4:43	Flyweight Grand Prix Semifinals
Flyweight 57 kg	(Japan) Yuka Okutomi	vs.	(Japan) Mana Akagi	Decision (unanimous)	2	3:00	Amateur Bout

== Deep Jewels 38 ==
Deep Jewels 38
- Promotion: Deep
- Date: September 11, 2022
- Venue: New Pier Hall
- City: Tokyo, Japan

Event chronology
Deep Jewels 37	Deep Jewels 38

Deep Jewels 38 was an MMA event of the DEEP JEWELS brand held by the Japanese Promotion Deep, held on September 11, 2022.

=== Background ===
The event was headlined by an atomweight bout between Aya Murakami and Moeri Suda, while a 50 kg catchweight bout between Kate Lotus and Eru Takebayashi served as the co-main event.

=== Fight card ===
Deep Jewels 38
Weight Class				Method	Round	T.Time	Notes
Atomweight 47.6 kg	(Japan) Moeri Suda	def.	(Japan) Aya Murakami	Decision (unanimous)	3	5:00	
Super atomweight 49 kg	(Japan) Namiko Kawabata	def.	(Japan) Yuko Kiryu	TKO (punches)	1	0:37	
Microweight 44 kg	(Japan) Mizuki Furuse	def.	(Japan) Momoko Yamazaki	Decision (unanimous)	2	5:00	
Catchweight 50 kg	(Japan) Kate Oyama	def.	(Japan) Eru Takebayashi	Decision (split)	2	5:00	
Strawweight 52.2 kg	(Japan) Mika Nagano	def.	(Japan) Tomoko Inoue	Submission (armbar)	1	4:19	
Catchweight 59 kg	(Japan) Aoi Kurayama	def.	(Japan) Tae Murayama	Decision (unanimous)	2	5:00	
Microweight 44 kg	(Japan) Kyoka Minagawa	def.	(Japan) Kimika Kawaguchi	Decision (unanimous)	2	5:00	
Catchweight 51 kg	(Japan) Momoka Yoshikawa	def.	(Japan) Misaki Suda	TKO (punches)	1	1:51	Amateur Bout
Catchweight 53 kg	(Japan) Sarah Suzuki	def.	(Japan) Sarah	Decision (split)	2	3:00	Amateur Bout
Catchweight 60 kg	(Japan) Haruka Suzuki	def.	(Japan) Serina Kondo	Decision (unanimous)	2	3:00	Amateur Bout
Flyweight 57 kg	(Japan) Momoko Saito	def.	(Japan) Machi Fukuda	Decision (unanimous)	2	3:00	Amateur Bout

== Deep Jewels 39 ==
Deep Jewels 39
- Promotion: Deep
- Date: November 23, 2022
- Venue: New Pier Hall
- City: Tokyo, Japan

Event chronology
Deep Jewels 38	Deep Jewels 39

Deep Jewels 39 was an MMA event of the DEEP JEWELS brand held by the Japanese Promotion Deep, held on November 23, 2022.

=== Background ===
The event was headlined by a bantamweight bout between Yoko Higashi and Titapa Junsookplung. A 49 kilogram catchweight bout between Miki Motono and Moeri Suda served as the co-main event.

=== Fight card ===
Deep Jewels 39
Weight Class				Method	Round	T.Time	Notes
Bantamweight 61 kg	(Japan) Yoko Higashi	def.	(Thailand) Titapa Junsookplung	TKO (Ground and pound)	3	2:12	
Catchweight 49 kg	(Japan) Miki Motono	def.	(Japan) Moeri Suda	Decision (Unanimous)	3	5:00	
Flyweight 57 kg	(Japan) Nori Pravajra	def.	(Japan) Mikiko Shimizu	Decision (Split)	3	5:00	
Flyweight 57 kg	(Japan) Aoi Kuriyama	def.	(Japan) Shoko Fujita	Decision (Unanimous)	2	5:00	
Strawweight 52 kg	(Japan) Arisa Matsuda	def.	(Japan) Mika Nagano	Decision (Unanimous)	2	5:00	
Strawweight 52 kg	(Japan) Machi Fukuda	def.	(Japan) Mika Arai	Decision (Unanimous)	2	5:00	
Bantamweight 61 kg	(Japan) Marina Kumagai	def.	(Japan) Chiko Hosoya	Decision (Unanimous)	2	5:00	
Bantamweight 61 kg	(Japan) Yurina Horiguchi	def.	(Japan) Sayaka Hishinuma	Submission (Kimura)	1	1:05	
Catchweight 54 kg	(Japan) Hitomi Taniyama	def.	(Japan) Mana Akagi	Submission (Rear-naked choke)	1	3:40	
Flyweight 57 kg	(Japan) Yuka Okutomi	def.	(Japan) Haruka Suzuki	Decision (Unanimous)	2	5:00	Amateur Bout
Strawweight 52 kg	(Japan) Miyu Tsunoda	def.	(Japan) Karin Horii	Decision (Unanimous)	2	5:00	Amateur Bout

== Deep Jewels 40 ==
Deep Jewels 40
- Promotion: Deep
- Date: February 18, 2023
- Venue: Shinjuku FACE
- City: Tokyo, Japan

Event chronology
Deep Jewels 39	Deep Jewels 40

Deep Jewels 40 was an MMA event of the DEEP JEWELS brand held by the Japanese Promotion Deep, held on February 18, 2023.

=== Background ===
The event was headlined by a super atomweight bout between Kate Lotus and Hikaru Aono, while a super strawweight bout between Namiko Kawabata and Machi Fukuda served as the co-main event.

=== Fight card ===
Deep Jewels 40
Weight Class				Method	Round	T.Time	Notes
Flyweight 57 kg	(Japan) Rin Nakai	def.	(Japan) Aoi Kuriyama	Submission (rear-naked choke)	2	4:31	
Strawweight 52 kg	(Japan) Machi Fukuda	def.	(Japan) Namiko Kawabata	Submission (rear-naked choke)	1	4:55	
Super atomweight 49 kg	(Japan) Hikaru Aono	def.	(Japan) Kate Oyama	Decision (Unanimous)	2	5:00	
Microweight 45 kg	(Japan) Akari Kamise	vs.	(Japan) Momoko Yamazaki	Decision (Unanimous)	2	5:00	
Strawweight 52 kg	(Japan) Eru Takebayashi	def.	(Japan) Hitomi Taniyama	Decision (Unanimous)	2	5:00	
Bantamweight 61 kg	(Japan) Tae Murayama	def.	(Japan) Sayaka Hishinuma	Decision (Unanimous)	2	5:00	
Openweight	(Japan) Mayumi Aoki	def.	(Japan) Yuko Matsuura	Decision (Unanimous)	2	5:00	
Microweight 45 kg	(Japan) Kyoka Minagawa	def.	(Japan) Koyuki	Submission (rear-naked choke)	2	2:03	
Flyweight 57 kg	(Japan) Mana Akagi	def.	(Japan) Haruka Suzuki	Submission (kimura)	2	4:47	
Strawweight 52 kg	(Japan) Sarah	def.	(Japan) Momoka Yoshikawa	Submission (rear-naked choke)	2	1:54	Amateur Bout

== Deep Jewels 41 ==
Deep Jewels 41
- Promotion: Deep
- Date: May 28, 2023
- Venue: New Pier Hall
- City: Tokyo, Japan

Event chronology
Deep Jewels 40	Deep Jewels 41

Deep Jewels 41 was an MMA event of the DEEP JEWELS brand held by the Japanese Promotion Deep, held on May 28, 2023.

=== Background ===
The event was headlined by a super atomweight bout between the Jewels Strawweight champion and Rizin FF Women's Super Atomweight champion Seika Izawa and the Jewels Microweight champion Suwanan Boonsorn.

=== Fight card ===
Deep Jewels 41
Weight Class				Method	Round	T.Time	Notes
Super atomweight 49 kg	(Japan) Seika Izawa	def.	(Thailand) Suwanan Boonsorn	Submission (Triangle Choke)	1	3:31	
Super atomweight 49 kg	(South Korea) Jeong Eun Park	def.	(Japan) Moeri Suda	TKO (Punches)	1	4:27	
Strawweight 52 kg	(Japan) Machi Fukuda	def.	(South Korea) Kim You-jeong	Technical Submission (Hammerlock)	1	2:24	
Super atomweight 49 kg	(Japan) Kate Oyama	def.	(Japan) Saki Kitamura	Decision (Unanimous)	2	5:00	
Atomweight 47.6 kg	(Japan) Mizuki Furuse	def.	(Japan) Akari Kamise	Decision (Unanimous)	2	5:00	
Flyweight 57 kg	(Japan) Yuka Okutomi	def.	(Japan) Mana Akagi	Decision (Unanimous)	2	5:00	
Catchweight 50,5 kg	(Japan) Misaki Suda	def.	(Japan) Momoka Yoshikawa	Decision (Unanimous)	2	3:00	Amateur Bout
Catchweight 55 kg	(Japan) Yua Yokose	def.	(Japan) Miyu Tsunoda	Decision (Unanimous)	2	3:00	Amateur Bout

== Deep Jewels 42 ==
Deep Jewels 42
- Promotion: Deep
- Date: September 10, 2023
- Venue: New Pier Hall
- City: Tokyo, Japan

Event chronology
Deep Jewels 41	Deep Jewels 42

Deep Jewels 42: 10th Anniversary was a MMA event of the DEEP JEWELS brand held by the Japanese Promotion Deep, held on September 10, 2023.

=== Background ===
A Jewels Microweight Championship bout between the champion Suwanan Boonsorn and challenger Aya Murakami served as the event headliner.

=== Fight card ===
Deep Jewels 42
Weight Class				Method	Round	T.Time	Notes
Microweight 44 kg	(Japan) Aya Murakami	def.	(Thailand) Suwanan Boonsorn (c)	Decision (unanimous)	3	5:00	For the Jewels Microweight Championship.
Super atomweight 49 kg	(South Korea) Park Si-woo	def.	(Japan) Namiko Kawabata	Decision (unanimous)	3	5:00	
Super atomweight 49 kg	(Japan) Moeri Suda	def.	(Japan) Kate Oyama	Decision (unanimous)	2	5:00	
Strawweight 52 kg	(Japan) Yuko Kiryu	def.	(Japan) Hikaru Aono	Decision (unanimous)	2	5:00	
Flyweight 57 kg	(Japan) Nori Pravajra	def.	(Japan) Momoko Saito	Decision (split)	2	5:00	
Microweight 44 kg	(Japan) Reina Kobayashi	def.	(Japan) Momoko Yamazaki	Decision (unanimous)	2	5:00	
Atomweight 47.6 kg	(South Korea) Lee Ye-ji	def.	(Japan) Mizuki Furuse	Decision (unanimous)	2	5:00	
Catchweight 50 kg	(Japan) Saki Kitamura	def.	(Japan) Eru Takebayashi	TKO (doctor stoppage)	1	2:19	
Microweight 44 kg	(Japan) Kyoka Minagawa	vs.	(Japan) Akari Kamise	No Contest (missed weight)	1	2:34	Kamise missed weight (46.15 kg). Originally a TKO (doctor stoppage) win for Kamise; overturned due to Kamise missed weight.
Lightweight 70 kg	(Japan) Chieko Hosoya	def.	(Japan) Yuko Matsuura	TKO (punches)	2	1:41	
Flyweight 57 kg	(Japan) Yuka Okutomi	def.	(Japan) Haruka Suzuki	TKO (punches)	1	3:16	
Strawweight 52 kg	(Japan) Sarah	def.	(Netherlands) Anouk Rossen	Decision (split)	2	3:00	Amateur Bout
Super atomweight 49 kg	(Japan) Miku Makihara	def.	(Japan) Misaki Suda	Submission (guillotine choke)	1	1:13	Amateur Bout

== Deep Jewels 43 ==
Deep Jewels 43
- Promotion: Deep
- Date: November 23, 2023
- Venue: New Pier Hall
- City: Tokyo, Japan

Event chronology
Deep Jewels 42	Deep Jewels 43

Deep Jewels 43 was a MMA event of the DEEP JEWELS brand held by the Japanese Promotion Deep, held on November 23, 2023.

=== Background ===
An interim Jewels Strawweight Championship bout between Arisa Matsuda and Machi Fukuda served as the event headliner.

=== Fight card ===
Deep Jewels 43
Weight Class				Method	Round	T.Time	Notes
Strawweight 52 kg	(Japan) Arisa Matsuda	def.	(Japan) Machi Fukuda	Decision (split) (28–29, 28–29, 29–28, 29–28, 29–28)	3	5:00	For the interim Jewels Strawweight Championship.
Super atomweight 49 kg	(Japan) Moeri Suda	def.	(Japan) Saki Kitamura	Technical Submission (armbar)	1	0:49	
Flyweight 57 kg	(Japan) Aoi Kurayama	def.	(Japan) Momoko Saito	TKO (punches)	1	2:51	
Bantamweight 61 kg	(Japan) Marina Kumagai	def.	(Japan) Tae Murayama	Decision (unanimous) (20–18, 20–18, 20–18)	2	5:00	
Microweight 44 kg	(Japan) Momoko Yamazaki	def.	(Japan) Koyuki	TKO (punches)	2	4:27	
Flyweight 57 kg	(Japan) Yuka Okutomi	def.	(Japan) Hitomi Taniyama	Decision (unanimous) (20–18, 20–18, 20–18)	2	5:00	
Bantamweight 61 kg	(Japan) Mana Akagi	def.	(Japan) Chieko Hosoya	Decision (unanimous) (19–18, 19–18, 19–19)	2	5:00	Scored 19–19 awards his Must Decision to Akagi.
Openweight	(Japan) Mayumi Aoki	def.	(Japan) Yuko Matsuura	Decision (unanimous) (20–18, 19–18, 19–18)	2	5:00	
Microweight 44 kg	(Japan) Kimika Kawaguchi	def.	(Japan) Chucky Ruby	Decision (unanimous) (20–18, 19–19, 19–19)	2	5:00	Scored 19–19 awards his Must Decision to Kawaguchi.
Catchweight 54 kg	(Japan) Yua Yokose	def.	(Japan) Akipi	Submission (rear-naked choke)	1	3:25	Grappling Bout
Catchweight 50 kg	(Japan) Sarah	def.	(Japan) Miku Yokose	Decision (unanimous) (20–18, 20–18, 19–19)	2	3:00	Amateur Bout. Scored 19–19 awards his Must Decision to Sarah.

== Deep Jewels 44 ==
Deep Jewels 44
- Promotion: Deep
- Date: March 24, 2024
- Venue: New Pier Hall
- City: Tokyo, Japan

Event chronology
Deep Jewels 43	Deep Jewels 44

Deep Jewels 44 will be an MMA event of the DEEP JEWELS brand held by the Japanese Promotion Deep, held on March 24, 2024.

=== Background ===
Jewels Atomweight championship bout between champion Park Si-yoon and challenger Seika Izawa is scheduled as the main event.

=== Fight card ===
Deep Jewels 44
Weight Class				Method	Round	T.Time	Notes
Atomweight 47.6 kg	(Japan) Seika Izawa	def.	(South Korea) Park Si-yoon (c)	Submission (ninja choke)	2	0:58	For the Jewels Atomweight championship.
Catchweight 49 kg	(Japan) Kate Oyama	def.	(Japan) Yuko Kiryu	TKO (punches)	1	1:28	
Catchweight 49 kg	(Japan) Saki Kitamura	def.	(Japan) Mizuki Furuse	KO (punch)	1	0:36	
Flyweight 57 kg	(Japan) Yuka Okutomi	vs.	(Japan) Momoko Saito	No Contest (missed weight)	2	5:00	Saito won the decision; no contest due to weight miss.
Microweight 45 kg	(South Korea) Eun Bi Cho	def.	(Japan) Momoko Yamazaki	KO (punches)	1	0:57	
Bantamweight 61 kg	(Japan) Marina Kumagai	def.	(Japan) Chieko Hosoya	Decision (unanimous)	2	5:00	
Microweight 45 kg	(Japan) Mahina	def.	(Japan) Kyoka Minagawa	Decision (unanimous)	2	5:00	
Flyweight 57 kg	(Japan) Haruka “BOSS” Suzuki	def.	(Japan) Hitomi Taniyama	Decision (unanimous)	2	5;00	
Catchweight 49 kg	(Japan) Miku Yokose	def.	(Japan) Misaki Suda	Submission (rear-naked choke)	1	2:14	Amateur Bout.

== Deep Jewels 45 ==
Deep Jewels 45
- Promotion: Deep
- Date: May 26, 2024
- Venue: New Pier Hall
- City: Tokyo, Japan

Event chronology
Deep Jewels 44	Deep Jewels 45

Deep Jewels 45 was a mixed martial arts event of the DEEP JEWELS brand held by the Japanese Promotion Deep, held on May 26, 2024.

=== Background ===
A pair of title fights took place at the event: a DEEP Women's Microweight Championship between champion Saori Oshima and challenger Aya Murakami. While, an interim Jewels Strawweight Championship bout between Park Si-woo and Machi Fukuda.

=== Fight card ===
Deep Jewels 45
Weight Class				Method	Round	T.Time	Notes
Microweight 44 kg	(Japan) Saori Oshima (c)	def.	(Japan) Aya Murakami (c)	TKO (punches)	1	3:05	For the DEEP and Jewels Microweight Championship.
Strawweight 52 kg	(South Korea) Park Si-woo	def.	(Japan) Machi Fukuda	Decision (split)	3	5:00	For the interim Jewels Strawweight Championship.
Catchweight 58 kg	(Japan) Rin Nakai	def.	(Japan) Namiko Kawabata	Technical Submission (guillotine choke)	3	1:33	
Catchweight 59 kg	(Japan) Momoko Saito	def.	(Japan) Tae Murayama	TKO (punches)	2	3:39	
Super Atomweight 49 kg	(Japan) Misaki Suda	def.	(Japan) Seari Sumimura	TKO (punches)	1	1:37	Amateur bout.
Catchweight 58 kg	(Japan) Cocoa Kitaoka	def.	(Japan) Luane Akemi	TKO (shoulder injury)	1	0:56	Amateur bout.

== Deep Jewels 46 ==
Deep Jewels 46
- Promotion: Deep
- Date: September 8, 2024
- Venue: New Pier Hall
- City: Tokyo, Japan

Event chronology
Deep Jewels 45	Deep Jewels 46

Deep Jewels 46 was a mixed martial arts event of the DEEP JEWELS brand held by the Japanese Promotion Deep, held on September 8, 2024.

=== Background ===
A strawweight bout between Machi Fukuda and Morgane Manfredi was scheduled as the main event, while a 49 kg catchweight bout between HIME and Saki Kitamura served as the co-main event.

=== Fight card ===
Deep Jewels 46
Weight Class				Method	Round	T.Time	Notes
Strawweight 52.2 kg	(Japan) Machi Fukuda	def.	(France) Morgane Manfredi	Submission (arm triangle choke)	2	2:43	
Catchweight 49 kg	(Japan) HIME	def.	(Japan) Saki Kitamura	Decision (unanimous)	2	5:00	
Atomweight 48 kg	(Japan) Aya Murakami	def.	(Japan) Yuko Kiryu	Submission (armbar)	2	4:49	
Microweight 44 kg	(Japan) Mahina China	def.	(Japan) Momoko Yamazaki	Decision (unanimous)	2	5:00	
Catchweight 60 kg	(Japan) Momoko Saito	def.	(Japan) Mana Akagi	Decision (unanimous)	2	5:00	
Atomweight 48 kg	(Japan) Misaki Suda	def.	(South Korea) Eun Bi Cho	TKO (ground and pound)	2	4:38	
Bantamweight 61 kg	(Japan) Haruka Suzuki	def.	(Japan) Tae Murayama	Decision (unanimous)	2	5:00	
Atomweight 48 kg	(Japan) Akari Kamise	def.	(Japan) Sarah	Submission (armbar)	1	3:56	
Featherweight 66 kg	(Japan) Serina Kondo	def.	(Japan) Mayumi Aoki	Decision (split)	2	5:00	
Flyweight 57 kg	(Japan) Asuka Nakamoto	def.	(Japan) Eri Isshiki	Decision (unanimous)	2	3:00	Amateur rules.
Strawweight 52.2 kg	(Japan) Asuka Yokoe	def.	(Japan) Hana Suyama	Decision (unanimous)	3	3:00	Amateur kickboxing rules.
Strawweight 52.2 kg	(Japan) Miku Yokose	def.	(Japan) Yuna Suyama	Decision (unanimous)	3	3:00	Amateur kickboxing rules.

== Deep Jewels 47 ==
Deep Jewels 47
- Promotion: Deep
- Date: November 23, 2024
- Venue: New Pier Hall
- City: Tokyo, Japan

Event chronology
Deep Jewels 46	Deep Jewels 47

Deep Jewels 47 was a mixed martial arts event of the DEEP JEWELS brand held by the Japanese Promotion Deep, held on November 23, 2024.

=== Background ===
A 58 kg catchweight bout between Rin Nakai and Haruka Suzuki was scheduled as the main event, while a bantamweight bout between Machi Fukuda and Suwanan Boonsorn served as the co-main event.

=== Fight card ===
Deep Jewels 47
Weight Class				Method	Round	T.Time	Notes
Catchweight 58 kg	(Japan) Rin Nakai	def.	(Japan) Haruka Suzuki	TKO (punches)	1	3:32	
Strawweight 52.2 kg	(Japan) Machi Fukuda	def.	(Thailand) Suwanan Boonsorn	Submission (heel hold)	2	2:27	
Bantamweight 61.2 kg	(Japan) Mana Akagi	def.	(Japan) Marina Kumagai	Submission (armlock)	1	1:08	
Bantamweight 61.2 kg	(Japan) Momoko Saito	def.	(Japan) Yurina Horiguchi	TKO (punches)	2	4:14	
Atomweight 47.6 kg	(Japan) Sarah	def.	(Japan) Miku Yokose	Decision (split)	2	5:00	
Strawweight 52.2 kg	(Japan) Saya Nakamura	def.	(Japan) Karin Horii	Submission (triangle choke)	2	3:10	
Strawweight 52.2 kg	(Japan) Nonoka Sakamoto	def.	(Japan) Yua Yokose	Submission (rear naked choke)	1	4:06	
Strawweight 52.2 kg	(Japan) Momoka Yoshikawa	def.	(Japan) Akipi	TKO (punches)	1	1:01	Amateur rules
Strawweight 52.2 kg	(Japan) Yuka Shimamura	def.	(Japan) Hana Suyama	Decision (unanimous)	2	2:00	Amateur kickboxing rules
Catchweight 49 kg	(Japan) Asuka Yokoe	def.	(Japan) Yuna Suyama	TKO (punches)	2	1:21	Amateur rules

== Deep Jewels 48 ==
Deep Jewels 48
- Promotion: Deep
- Date: March 23, 2025
- Venue: New Pier Hall
- City: Tokyo, Japan

Event chronology
Deep Jewels 47	Deep Jewels 48

Deep Jewels 48 was a mixed martial arts event of the DEEP JEWELS brand held by the Japanese Promotion Deep, held on March 23, 2025.

=== Background ===
A 49 kg catchweight bout between Ayaka Hamasaki and Moeri Suda was booked as the main event.

=== Fight card ===
Deep Jewels 48
Weight Class				Method	Round	T.Time	Notes
Catchweight 49 kg	(Japan) Moeri Suda	def.	(Japan) Ayaka Hamasaki	Submission (rear naked choke)	1	2:28	
Bantamweight 61.2 kg	(Japan) Yoko Higashi	def.	(Japan) Mana Akagi	TKO (punches)	2	3:48	
Catchweight 49 kg	(Japan) Hikaru Aono	def.	(Japan) Saki Kitamura	Decision (unanimous)	3	5:00	
Microweight 44 kg	(Japan) Momoko Yamazaki	def.	(Japan) Kimika Kawaguchi	Decision (split)	2	5:00	
Microweight 44 kg	(Japan) Rena Kobayashi	def.	(Japan) Kyoka Minagawa	TKO (ground and pound)	2	4:18	
Catchweight 49 kg	(Japan) Misaki Suda	def.	(Japan) Saya Nakamura	Decision (split)	2	5:00	
Catchweight 63 kg	(France) Elena	def.	(Japan) Yuko Matsuura	TKO (punches)	2	4:50	
Strawweight 51.2 kg	(Japan) Yua Yokose	def.	(Japan) Karin Horii	Submission (anaconda choke)	2	1:10	
Catchweight 49 kg	(Japan) Miku Yokose	def.	(Japan) Asuka Yokoe	Submission (rear naked choke)	2	2:25	
Strawweight 52.2 kg	(Japan) Saki Nakamura	def.	(Japan) Yuka Shimamura	Decision (majority)	2	2:00	Kickboxing rules
Strawweight 52.2 kg	(Japan) Akipi	def.	(Japan) Serina Wada	Submission (rear naked choke)	1	1:01	Amateur rules
