= Rin Nakai =

Japanese mixed martial artist

Rin Nakai 中井 りん
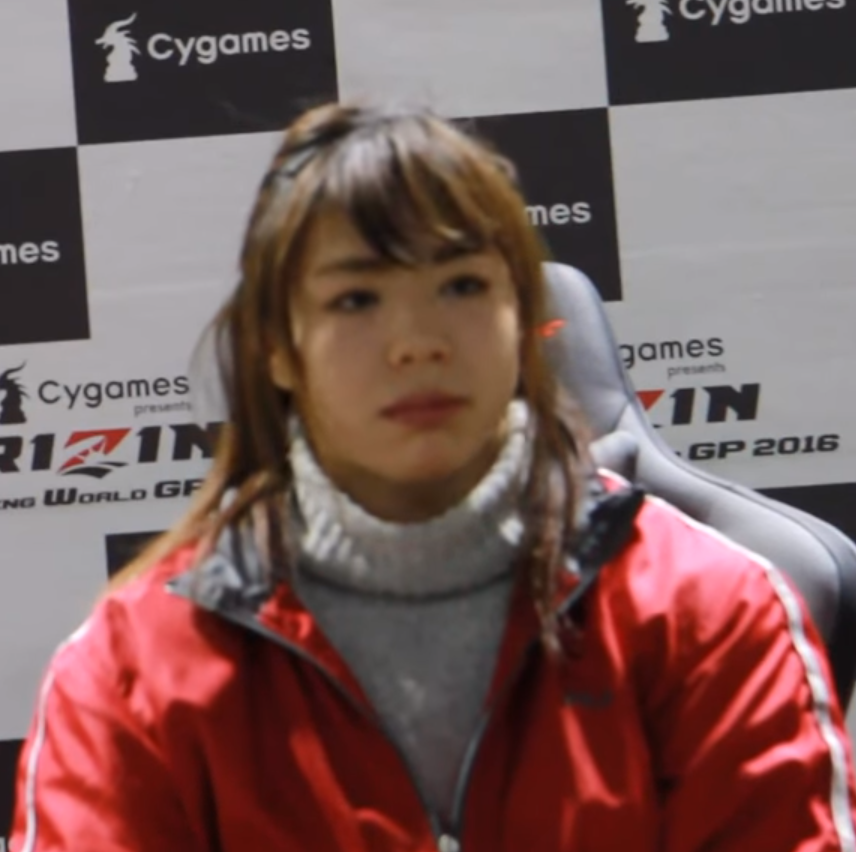
- Born: October 22, 1986 (age 39); Matsuyama, Ehime Prefecture, Japan
- Height: 5 ft 1 in (155 cm)
- Weight: 125 lb (57 kg; 8 st 13 lb)
- Division: Flyweight
- Reach: 60.5 in (154 cm)
- Style: Judo
- Fighting out of: Japan
- Team: Pancrase Venus
- Years active: 2006–Present (MMA)

Mixed martial arts record
- Total: 33
- Wins: 29
- By knockout: 10
- By submission: 12
- By decision: 7
- Losses: 2
- By decision: 2
- Draws: 1
- No contests: 1

Other information
- Mixed martial arts record from Sherdog
- Last updated on: May 24, 2026

Rin Nakai (中井 りん, also なかい りん, Nakai Rin; born October 22, 1986) is a Japanese professional mixed martial artist. Starting her MMA career in 2006, she has participated in the organizations Pancrase, Smackgirl, Valkyrie and the UFC.

Nakai has been rated amongst top ten of Women's Flyweight and Bantamweight fighters between 2006 and 2018.

== Biography ==
Nakai was born on October 22, 1986, in Matsuyama, Ehime Prefecture. She started training in judo at the age of three. She was ranked #5 in judo in all of Japan in middle school and #3 in senior high school. She graduated from Takanawadai High School (a Middle School attached to Tokai University) and later dropped out of Teikyo University.

=== Early MMA ===
Nakai started fighting on October 1, 2006. She defeated Asuka Ito by TKO (technical knockout), after breaking Ito's nose at Pancrase 2006 Blow Tour.

=== Smackgirl ===
On May 19, 2007, she fought against Kazue Matake in her first fight for the Smackgirl promotion and won the decision.

On September 6, 2007, she fought against Asha Ingeneri in Smackgirl and defeated her on round one, at 1 minute 3 seconds with an armbar.

On April 25, 2008, she defeated Kanako Takeshita at her final fight for the Smackgirl promotion.

=== Valkyrie ===
On December 7, 2008, she fought against WINDY Tomomi at the 4th "Pancrase-ism"-sponsored event and won by TKO with a mounted punch.

Nakai had a year and two month-long gap before her next fight. On February 11, 2010, she played against Mizuho Sato at VALKYRIE 04, which was her first fight for the VALKYRIE promotion, and won by Kimura Lock.

On June 19, 2010, she fought against Megumi Yabushita at VALKYRIE 06 and won a 3–0 decision.

On September 26, 2010, she fought against Mayumi Aoki in the semi-final of the women's open-weight class first champion decision tournament of VALKYRIE 07, and won with an armbar.

On November 28, 2010, she faced-off again with Mizuho Sato in the women's open-weight first championship tournament final of VALKYRIE 08. Nakai defeated Sato by Doctor Stoppage, when it was suspected that Sato had fractured of the orbital floor of her left eye. This win also earned Nakai the Valkyrie tournament win.

On December 30, 2010, in the VALKYRIE-sponsored match of the "Battlefield - Soul of Fight" event held at the Ariake Coliseum, she fought Mika "HARI" Harigai and won by Keylock submission. This extended Nakai's winning streak from her debut to 10 and this achievement landed her on the front page of Tokyo Chunichi Sports the following day.

=== Return to Pancrase ===
On September 4, 2011, Nakai fought Danielle West to a split-decision draw at "Pancrase - Impressive Tour 9". On December 1, 2012, Nakai would rematch Danielle West at "Pancrase - Progress Tour 14", with Nakai this time defeating West by unanimous decision.

Nakai returned to Pancrase on May 20, 2012, defeating Kyoko Kimura via submission due to an armbar at Pancrase Progress Tour 6.

Nakai faced Mayumi Aoki in a rematch at Pancrase Progress Tour 10 on September 1, 2012. The fight was part of the opening round of the bantamweight Queen of Pancrase tournament. Nakai defeated Aoki by TKO in the second round.

On December 1, 2012, Nakai faced Danielle West in a rematch for the bantamweight Queen of Pancrase title at Pancrase Progress Tour 14. She defeated West by unanimous decision to become the first bantamweight Queen of Pancrase. There was a good deal of controversy surrounding the bout however, as some journalists, and observers accused Pancrase of "fixing" the match. West came in 1 kg heavy for the fight and as a result Pancrase officials made her cut weight a second time on the day of the fight to prevent her from re-hydrating. Beyond a second weight cut they also informed her that no knees or chokes would be allowed. However officials failed to inform West that the rule would only apply to her, Nakai would have no restrictions. West was only made fully aware of this discrepancy mid-fight. Following the fight West was also informed that even if she had won the contest it would have been declared a draw or no-decision.

On May 11, 2014, she fought against Sarah D'Alelio in Pancrase and won the decision.

She fought against Tara LaRosa in Pancrase on September 29, 2013, winning a 2–0 decision.

=== UFC ===
In 2014, Nakai made her move to the American UFC promotion. When Nakai began competing for the UFC, the organization did not have a women's flyweight division (-56.7 kg), so she had to compete at bantamweight (-61.2 kg). Her UFC debut took place at UFC Fight Night: Hunt vs. Nelson on September 20, 2014. Her opponent was Miesha Tate, who at the time was ranked second in the women's bantamweight rankings. Nakai would lose the fight by 0-3 decision and was the first loss in her MMA career. At UFC Fight Night: Hunt vs. Mir on March 19, 2016, she faced Leslie Smith and lost a 0–3 decision.

=== Post UFC ===
On July 24, 2016, she fought against Emiko Raika at Pancrase 279 and won by TKO with an elbow on the ground.

On September 29, 2016, Nakai competed at Rizin World Grand Prix 2016: 2nd Round . She defeated the decorated female wrestler Kanako Murata via 3rd round submission (Rear Naked Choke) to improve her record to 19-2.

On February 24, 2018, she made a comeback at DEEP 82 IMPACT for the first time in a year and two months. She fought against Kim Ji-young, taking the mount position and winning the TKO with a series of elbow strikes.

At Deep Jewels 24, Nakai faced Kaewjai Prachumwong, defeating her via TKO stoppage in the second round.

On October 22, 2019, she fought against Titapa Junsookplung (alias Diamond Rose the Rocket) at Deep Jewels 26 and defeated her with an armbar.

She fought Shoko Fujita in the Deep-Jewels Flyweight Grand Prix quarterfinal bout at Deep Jewels 36 on March 12, 2022., winning by TKO.

On May 8, 2022, she fought Tae Murayama in the DEEP JEWELS Flyweight Grand Prix semi-final held at Deep Jewels 37, winning by armbar in the second round. She advanced to the final on the same day, defeating Shizuka Sugiyama via armbar at the end of the first round, winning the Grand Prix, and becoming the first Deep Jewels Flyweight Champion.

Nakai faced Aoi Kuriyama on February 18, 2023, at Deep Jewels 40. She won the fight by a second-round submission.

Nakai was scheduled to defend her Deep Jewels Flyweight championship against Aoi Kuriyama on May 26, 2024, at Deep Jewels 45. Kuriyama withdrew due to injury, and was replaced by Namiko Kawabata. Nakai won the fight by a third-round technical submission.

== Championships and accomplishments ==
- VALKYRIE
  - First VALKYRIE Open Weight Championship (2010)
- Pancrase
  - First Bantamweight Queen of Pancrase Championship (2012)
- Fight Matrix
  - Highest Quarterly Ranking: 1/01/2010, #2 Women Flyweight

== Mixed martial arts record ==
Professional record breakdown
32 matches	29 wins	2 losses
By knockout	10	0
By submission	12	0
By decision	7	2
Draws	1	

Res.	Record	Opponent	Method	Event	Date	Round	Time	Location	Notes
Win	29–2–1	Yuka Okutomi	Decision (unanimous)	Deep Jewels 63	May 24, 2026	3	5:00	Tokyo, Japan	Defended the Jewels Flyweight Championship.
Win	28–2–1	Haruka Suzuki	TKO (punches)	Deep Jewels 47	November 23, 2024	1	3:32	Tokyo, Japan	Catchweight (128 lb) bout.
Win	27–2–1	Namiko Kawabata	Technical Submission (guillotine choke)	Deep Jewels 45	May 26, 2024	3	1:33	Tokyo, Japan	Catchweight (128 lb) bout.
Win	26–2–1	Aoi Kuriyama	Technical Submission (rear-naked choke)	Deep Jewels 40	February 18, 2023	2	4:31	Tokyo, Japan	
Win	25–2–1	Shizuka Sugiyama	Technical Submission (armbar)	Deep Jewels 37	May 8, 2022	1	4:53	Tokyo, Japan	Won the Deep Jewels Flyweight Grand Prix and the inaugural Jewels Flyweight Championship.
Win	24–2–1	Tae Murayama	Technical Submission (armbar)	Deep Jewels 37	May 8, 2022	2	4:43	Tokyo, Japan	Deep Jewels Flyweight Grand Prix Semifinal.
Win	23–2–1	Shoko Fujita	TKO (punches)	Deep Jewels 36	March 12, 2022	2	4:38	Tokyo, Japan	Deep Jewels Flyweight Grand Prix Quarterfinal.
Win	22–2–1	Titapa Junsookplung	Technical Submission (armbar)	Deep Jewels 26	October 21, 2019	1	3:20	Tokyo, Japan	Catchweight (139 lb) bout.
Win	21–2–1	Kaewjai Prachumwong	TKO (punches)	Deep Jewels 24	June 9, 2019	2	1:56	Tokyo, Japan	
Win	20–2–1	Kim Young-ji	TKO (elbows)	DEEP 82 Impact	February 24, 2018	1	4:37	Tokyo, Japan	
Win	19–2–1	Kanako Murata	Submission (rear-naked choke)	Rizin World Grand Prix 2016: 2nd Round	December 29, 2016	3	1:16	Saitama, Japan	
Win	18–2–1	Charlene Watt	TKO (punches)	Pancrase 282	November 13, 2016	2	3:43	Tokyo, Japan	
Win	17–2–1	Emiko Raika	TKO (elbows)	Pancrase 279	July 24, 2016	3	2:43	Tokyo, Japan	Return to Flyweight.
Loss	16–2–1	Leslie Smith	Decision (unanimous)	UFC Fight Night: Hunt vs. Mir	March 20, 2016	3	5:00	Brisbane, Australia	
Loss	16–1–1	Miesha Tate	Decision (unanimous)	UFC Fight Night: Hunt vs. Nelson	September 20, 2014	3	5:00	Saitama, Japan	
Win	16–0–1	Sarah D'Alelio	Decision (unanimous)	Pancrase 258	May 11, 2014	3	5:00	Tokyo, Japan	Defended the Pancrase Women's Bantamweight Championship.
Win	15–0–1	Tara LaRosa	Decision (majority)	Pancrase 252	September 29, 2013	3	5:00	Yokohama, Japan	Non-title bantamweight bout.
Win	14–0–1	Brenda Gonzales	Submission (rear-naked choke)	Pancrase 247	May 19, 2013	1	4:47	Tokyo, Japan	Defended the Pancrase Women's Bantamweight Championship.
Win	13–0–1	Danielle West	Decision (unanimous)	Pancrase Progress Tour 14	December 1, 2012	3	5:00	Tokyo, Japan	Won the inaugural Pancrase Women's Bantamweight Championship.
Win	12–0–1	Mayumi Aoki	TKO (punches)	Pancrase Progress Tour 10	September 1, 2012	2	3:45	Tokyo, Japan	
Win	11–0–1	Kyoko Kimura	Technical Submission (armbar)	Pancrase Progress Tour 6	May 20, 2012	1	4:32	Okinawa, Japan	
Draw	10–0–1	Danielle West	Draw (split)	Pancrase Impressive Tour 9	September 4, 2011	3	5:00	Tokyo, Japan	Return to Bantamweight.
Win	10–0	Mika Harigai	Submission (keylock)	Sengoku 16	December 30, 2010	1	2:09	Tokyo, Japan	Featherweight bout.
Win	9–0	Mizuho Sato	TKO (doctor stoppage)	VALKYRIE 08	November 28, 2010	1	5:00	Tokyo, Japan	Won the vacant GCM Open Weight Championship.
Win	8–0	Mayumi Aoki	Submission (armbar)	VALKYRIE 07	September 26, 2010	1	2:40	Tokyo, Japan	Open Weight debut.
Win	7–0	Megumi Yabushita	Decision (unanimous)	Valkyrie 06	June 19, 2010	3	3:00	Tokyo, Japan	
Win	6–0	Mizuho Sato	Submission (kimura)	VALKYRIE 04	February 11, 2010	1	1:56	Tokyo, Japan	Bantamweight debut.
Win	5–0	Tomomi Sunaba	TKO (punches)	Pancrase 196	December 7, 2008	1	1:33	Tokyo, Japan	
Win	4–0	Kanako Takeshita	Decision (split)	Smackgirl: World ReMix 2008 Second Round	April 25, 2008	2	5:00	Tokyo, Japan	
Win	3–0	Asha Ingeneri	Submission (armbar)	Smackgirl: Queens' Hottest Summer	September 6, 2007	1	1:03	Tokyo, Japan	
Win	2–0	Kazue Matake	Decision (unanimous)	Smackgirl: The Queen Said the USA is Strongest	May 19, 2007	2	5:00	Tokyo, Japan	
Win	1–0	Asuka Ito	TKO (doctor stoppage)	Pancrase 167	October 1, 2006	1	1:25	Osaka, Japan	Flyweight debut.
