= Reina Miura =

Japanese MMA fighter

- Born: 三浦 伶奈; 22 July 1996 (age 30); Tokyo, Japan
- Nickname: King
- Nationality: Japanese
- Height: 5 ft 3 in (1.60 m)
- Weight: 146 lb (66 kg; 10.4 st)
- Division: Featherweight
- Style: Judo; Sambo
- Fighting out of: Musashimurayama, Tokyo, Japan
- Team: FIGHT CLUB 428 (2015 - 2021); Unaffiliated (2021-present)
- Years active: 2015–present

Kickboxing record
- Total: 4
- Wins: 2
- By knockout: 0
- Losses: 2
- By knockout: 0

Mixed martial arts record
- Total: 18
- Wins: 13
- By knockout: 4
- By submission: 5
- By decision: 4
- Losses: 5
- By decision: 5

Other information
- Mixed martial arts record from Sherdog

Reina Miura (三浦 伶奈, born 22 July 1996) is a Japanese professional mixed martial artist, currently competing in the featherweight division of Rizin and DEEP.

== Mixed martial arts career ==
=== Early career ===
==== Openweight career ====
Miura made her amateur mixed martial arts debut against Nao DATE at Deep Jewels 10 on November 22, 2015. The fight was ruled a no contest, as Miura had missed weight before the fight.

Miura made her professional debut against Eriko Iwamoto, in a 165 lbs catchweight bout, at Deep Jewels 14 on November 3, 2016. She won the fight by a first-round technical submission. Prior to the fight, Miura left the Keishukai HEARTS and began training at Reversal Gym Tachikawa Alpha. It was from this fight onward that she began to compete under the ringname "King Miura" as well.

Miura made her lightweight debut against Shayna Baszler at Deep Jewels 15 on February 25, 2017. She won the fight by unanimous decision.

Miura made her Rizin and openweight debut against Jazzy Gabert at Rizin FF 5: Sakura on April 16, 2017. She won the fight by a second-round submission, forcing Gabert to tap six seconds before the end of the round.

Miura was scheduled to face the professional wrestler Kristin Handel in a 164 lbs catchweight bout at Deep Jewels 16 on May 20, 2017. Handel came into the fight with a 23 cm height and 15 kg weight advantage. Nevertheless, Miura won the fight by a first-round technical knockout.

Miura was scheduled to face Lei'D Tapa, another professional wrestler, at Rizin World Grand Prix 2017 Opening Round - Part 1 on July 30, 2017. She won the fight by unanimous decision. Prior to the fight, Miura left Reversal Gym Tachikawa Alpha and began training at FIGHT CLUB 428.

Miura was scheduled to face Young Ji Kim at Deep 79 Impact on September 16, 2017. She won the fight by a first-round armbar submission.

Miura was scheduled to face Crystal Stokes at Rizin World Grand Prix 2017: Opening Round - Part 2 on October 15, 2017. She won the fight by unanimous decision.

==== Return to lightweight ====
Miura returned to lightweight for her next bout, as she was scheduled to face Cindy Dandois at Rizin World Grand Prix 2017: 2nd Round on December 29, 2017.

Miura was scheduled to face Soyoung Park at Deep Jewels 19 on March 10, 2018. She won the fight by a first-round submission.

=== Drop down to featherweight ===
Miura dropped down to featherweight for her bout against Eun Ji Choi at Deep Jewels 20 on June 9, 2018. She won the fight by a first-round technical knockout.

Miura was scheduled to face Kaitlin Young at Rizin 12 on August 12, 2018. Young won the fight by unanimous decision.

Miura was scheduled to face Judith Ruis at Deep Jewels 22 on December 1, 2018. She won the fight by unanimous decision.

Miura was scheduled to face Mao Ueda, in a 150 lbs catchweight bout, at Deep Jewels 23 on March 8, 2019. She won by a first-round knockout, stopping Ueda after just 25 seconds.

Miura was scheduled to face Stephanie Egger, in a 138 lbs catchweight bout, at Rizin 17 on July 28, 2019. Egger won the fight by unanimous decision.

Miura was scheduled to Nitchanan Thubtrai, back at featherweight, at Deep Jewels 28 on February 24, 2020. She won the fight by a first-round technical knockout.

Miura was scheduled to face Yoko Higashi at Deep 101 Impact on June 20, 2021. Higashi won the fight by unanimous decision.

Miura was scheduled to face the undefeated Tae Murayama at Deep Jewels 35 on December 11, 2021. She won the fight by a first-round submission.

Miura was booked to face Yoko Higashi for the inaugural DEEP Jewels Featherweight championship at Deep Jewels 38 on May 8, 2022.

== Mixed martial arts record ==
Professional record breakdown
18 matches	13 wins	5 losses
By knockout	4	0
By submission	5	0
By decision	4	5

Res.	Record	Opponent	Method	Event	Date	Round	Time	Location	Notes
Loss	13–5	Yoko Higashi	Decision (unanimous)	Deep Jewels 37	May 8, 2022	4	5:00	Tokyo, Japan	For the inaugural DEEP Jewels Featherweight championship
Win	13–4	Tae Murayama	Submission (armbar)	Deep Jewels 35	December 11, 2021	1	4:55	Tokyo, Japan	
Loss	12–4	Yoko Higashi	Decision (unanimous)	Deep 101 Impact	June 20, 2021	3	5:00	Tokyo, Japan	
Win	12–3	Nitchanan Thubtrai	TKO (punches)	Deep Jewels 28	February 24, 2020	1	3:29	Tokyo, Japan	
Loss	11–3	Stephanie Egger	Decision (unanimous)	Rizin 17	July 28, 2019	3	5:00	Saitama, Japan	139 lbs catchweight bout.
Win	11–2	Mao Ueda	KO (punches)	Deep Jewels 23	March 8, 2019	1	0:25	Tokyo, Japan	150 lbs catchweight bout.
Win	10–2	Judith Ruis	Decision (unanimous)	Deep Jewels 22	December 1, 2018	3	5:00	Tokyo, Japan	
Loss	9–2	Kaitlin Young	Decision (unanimous)	Rizin 12	August 12, 2018	3	5:00	Nagoya, Japan	
Win	9–1	Eun Ji Choi	TKO (punches)	Deep Jewels 20	June 9, 2018	1	1:40	Tokyo, Japan	Featherweight debut.
Win	8–1	Soyoung Park	Submission (V1 arm lock)	Deep Jewels 19	March 10, 2018	1	1:30	Tokyo, Japan	
Loss	7–1	Cindy Dandois	Decision (split)	Rizin World Grand Prix 2017: 2nd Round	December 29, 2017	3	5:00	Saitama, Japan	Return to lightweight.
Win	7–0	Crystal Stokes	Decision (unanimous)	Rizin World Grand Prix 2017: Opening Round - Part 2	October 15, 2017	3	5:00	Fukuoka, Japan	
Win	6–0	Young Ji Kim	Submission (armbar)	Deep 79 Impact	September 16, 2017	1	4:48	Tokyo, Japan	
Win	5–0	Lei'D Tapa	Decision (unanimous)	Rizin World Grand Prix 2017 Opening Round - Part 1	July 30, 2017	3	5:00	Saitama, Japan	
Win	4–0	Kristin Handel	TKO (punches)	Deep Jewels 16	May 20, 2017	1	4:24	Tokyo, Japan	164 lbs catchweight bout.
Win	3–0	Jazzy Gabert	Submission (armbar)	Rizin FF 5: Sakura	April 16, 2017	2	4:54	Yokohama, Japan	Openweight debut.
Win	2–0	Shayna Baszler	Decision (unanimous)	Deep Jewels 15	February 25, 2017	2	5:00	Tokyo, Japan	Lightweight debut.
Win	1–0	Eriko Iwamoto	Technical Submission (armbar)	Deep Jewels 14	November 3, 2016	1	1:57	Tokyo, Japan	165 lbs catchweight bout.

Amateur record breakdown		
1 match	0 wins	0 losses
No contests	1	

Res.	Record	Opponent	Method	Event	Date	Round	Time	Location	Notes
NC	0-0 (1)	Nao Murayama	NC (Miura Missed Weight)	Deep Jewels 10	22 November 2015	2	3:00	Tokyo, Japan	

== Kickboxing record ==
Professional Kickboxing Record
2 Wins (0 (T)KO's), 2 Losses, 0 Draw, 0 No Contest
Date	Result	Opponent	Event	Location	Method	Round	Time
2021-07-29	Loss	(Japan) Mina Sakurai	SHOOT BOXING Girls S-cup2021 -Road to Tournament-	Taitō, Japan	Decision (Unanimous)	3	3:00
2020-09-20	Loss	(Japan) Marina Kumagai	DEEP 97 Impact	Tokyo, Japan	Decision (Unanimous)	3	3:00
2020-08-22	Win	(Japan) Marina Kumagai	DEEP 95 Impact	Tokyo, Japan	Decision (Unanimous)	3	3:00
2018-07-06	Win	(South Korea) Young Ji Kim	Shoot Boxing Girls S-Cup	Tokyo, Japan	Decision (Unanimous)	3	3:00
Legend: Win Loss Draw/No contest Notes

== See also ==
- List of female kickboxers
- List of female mixed martial artists
- List of current Rizin FF fighters
