= Aya Murakami (fighter) =

Japanese mixed martial artist

- Born: March 17, 1992 (age 34); Tokyo, Japan
- Nationality: Japanese
- Height: 4 ft 11 in (1.50 m)
- Weight: 97 lb (44 kg; 6 st 13 lb)
- Division: Atomweight; Microweight
- Style: Brazilian jiu-jitsu
- Fighting out of: Tokyo, Japan
- Team: Unaffiliated (2020-2024); Shooto Gym Tokyo (2025-present); CARPE DIEM MITA (BJJ)
- Years active: 2020–present

Mixed martial arts record
- Total: 13
- Wins: 9
- By knockout: 0
- By submission: 5
- By decision: 4
- Losses: 4
- By knockout: 1
- By submission: 0
- By decision: 3

Other information
- Mixed martial arts record from Sherdog

Aya Murakami (村上 彩, Murakami Aya; born March 17, 1992) is a Japanese mixed martial artist, currently fighting in the microweight division of Jewels, where she is a former microweight champion.

== Mixed martial arts career ==
=== Jewels ===
Murakami made her professional debut against Moeri Suda at Deep Jewels 30 on October 31, 2020. She replaced Rion Noda who withdrew from the fight on October 13, after suffering an injury in training. Although the fight was ruled a majority decision after the two rounds were contested, with one scorecard of 20–18 for Murakami and two even 19–19 scorecards, the victory was awarded to Murakami under the Deep Jewels rules.

Murakami was expected to face Hikaru Aono in the semifinals of the 2021 Deep Jewels Atomweight Grand Prix at Deep Jewels 33 on June 19, 2021. Murakami withdrew from the bout on May 5, 2021, as she was hospitalized due to illness.

Murakami faced Kyoka Minagawa at Deep Jewels 34 on December 19, 2020. She won the fight by a first-round armbar submission.

Murakami faced Mizuki Furuse at Deep Jewels 35 on December 11, 2021. She won the fight by a first-round armbar submission.

Murakami faced Moeri Suda in a rematch at Deep Jewels 38 on September 11, 2022, having previously won by a unanimous decision win in both of their professional debuts. She lost the fight by unanimous decision.

Murakami faced Mizuki Oshiro at Deep 111 on December 11, 2022. She won the fight by unanimous decision, with scores of 20—18, 20—17 and 20—16.

==== Jewels Microweight Champion ====
Murakami faced defending microweight champion Suwanan Boonsorn at Deep Jewels 42 on September 10, 2023. She won the bout by unanimous decision, thus winning the microweight championship.

Murakami made her first Jewels Microweight Championship defense against Saori Oshima at Deep Jewels 45 on May 26, 2024, while simultaneously challenging for the DEEP Women's Microweight Championship. She lost the fight by a first-round technical knockout.

Murakami faced Yuko Kiryu at Deep Jewels 46 on September 8, 2024. She won the fight by a second-round technical submission.

=== Shooto ===
Murakami faced the undefeated erika at Shooto 2025 Vol.4 on May 18, 2025. She lost the fight by majority decision.

== Championships and accomplishments ==
=== Brazilian Jiu Jitsu ===
- Japan Brazilian Jiu-Jitsu Federation
  - 2019 All Japan Brazilian Jiu-Jitsu Championships Light Featherweight 3rd Place (Black belt)
  - 2023 All Japan Master Jiu-Jitsu Championship Light Featherweight 3rd Place (Black belt)
  - 2023 All Japan Brazilian Jiu-Jitsu Championships Featherweight Runner-up (Black belt)
  - 2024 All Japan Brazilian Jiu-Jitsu Championships Featherweight and Openweight 3rd Place (Black belt)

=== Mixed martial arts ===
- Jewels
  - Jewels Microweight Championship (One time; Former)

== Mixed martial arts record ==
Professional record breakdown
| 14 matches | 10 wins | 4 losses |
| By knockout | 0 | 1 |
| By submission | 5 | 0 |
| By decision | 5 | 3 |

| Res. | Record | Opponent | Method | Event | Date | Round | Time | Location | Notes |
|---|---|---|---|---|---|---|---|---|---|
| Loss | 10–4 | Chiyo Takamoto | Decision (majority) | Shooto 2026 Vol.2 | March 29, 2026 | 2 | 5:00 | Tokyo, Japan | |
| Win | 10–3 | Mio Shimaya | Decision (unanimous) | Shooto 2025 Vol.7 | September 21, 2025 | 2 | 5:00 | Tokyo, Japan | Catchweight (110 lb) bout. |
| Win | 9–3 | Tomoe Katayama | Submission (armbar) | Shooto 2025 Vol.6 | July 20, 2025 | 2 | 4:49 | Tokyo, Japan | |
| Loss | 8–3 | Erika Gibo | Decision (majority) | Shooto 2025 Vol.4 | May 18, 2025 | 2 | 5:00 | Tokyo, Japan | |
| Win | 8–2 | Yuko Kiryu | Technical Submission (armbar) | Deep Jewels 46 | September 8, 2024 | 2 | 4:49 | Tokyo, Japan | Atomweight bout. |
| Loss | 7–2 | Saori Oshima | TKO (punches) | Deep Jewels 45 | May 26, 2024 | 1 | 3:05 | Tokyo, Japan | Lost the Jewels Microweight Championship; For the DEEP Women's Microweight Championship. |
| Win | 7–1 | Suwanan Boonsorn | Decision (unanimous) | Deep Jewels 42 | September 10, 2023 | 3 | 5:00 | Tokyo, Japan | Won the Jewels Microweight Championship. |
| Win | 6–1 | Sadae Suzumura | Decision (unanimous) | Deep Osaka Impact 2023 | 2 April 2023 | 3 | 5:00 | Saitama, Japan | |
| Win | 5–1 | Mizuki Oshiro | Decision (unanimous) | Deep 111 | December 11, 2022 | 1 | 1:37 | Tokyo, Japan | Return to Super Atomweight. |
| Loss | 4–1 | Moeri Suda | Decision (unanimous) | Deep Jewels 38 | September 11, 2022 | 3 | 5:00 | Tokyo, Japan | Atomweight debut. |
| Win | 4–0 | Mizuki Furuse | Submission (armbar) | Deep Jewels 35 | December 11, 2021 | 1 | 4:58 | Tokyo, Japan | |
| Win | 3–0 | Yasuko Tamada | Submission (armbar) | DEEP Tokyo Impact 2021 ~2nd Round~ | October 17, 2021 | 1 | 3:33 | Tokyo, Japan | Return to Super Atomweight. |
| Win | 1–0 | Kyoka Minagawa | Submission (armbar) | Deep Jewels 34 | December 19, 2020 | 1 | 4:16 | Tokyo, Japan | Microweight debut. |
| Win | 1–0 | Moeri Suda | Decision (unanimous) | Deep Jewels 30 | October 31, 2020 | 2 | 5:00 | Tokyo, Japan | Super Atomweight debut. |
