= Miki Motono =

Japanese mixed martial artist

- Born: May 18, 1994 (age 32); Ishikawa Prefecture, Japan
- Native name: 本野美樹
- Nationality: Japanese
- Height: 5 ft 3 in (1.60 m)
- Weight: 108.0 lb (49 kg; 7 st 10 lb)
- Division: Strawweight (2019-2021); Atomweight (2022-present)
- Style: Judo, Wrestling
- Stance: Orthodox
- Fighting out of: Tokyo, Japan
- Team: AACC
- Years active: 2019–present

Mixed martial arts record
- Total: 16
- Wins: 11
- By knockout: 3
- By submission: 2
- By decision: 6
- Losses: 5
- By submission: 2
- By decision: 3

Other information
- University: Tokai University
- Mixed martial arts record from Sherdog

Miki Motono (本野美樹, born May 18, 1994) is a Japanese mixed martial artist, currently competing in the atomweight division of Deep Jewels. A professional competitor since 2019, she is the former Deep Jewels interim strawweight champion.

== Mixed martial arts career ==
=== DEEP JEWELS ===
==== Early career ====
Motono made her professional debut against Mariya Suzuki at HEAT 44 on March 2, 2019. She utilized her superior grappling to win the fight by unanimous decision, with all three judges awarding her both rounds of the bout.

Motono faced the more experienced Mika Nagano (16–11–1) at Deep Jewels 24 on June 9, 2019, in her second professional appearance. She won the fight by unanimous decision, with all three judges once again awarding her both rounds of the bout.

Motono moved out of Japan for her next bout, as she faced the Eternal MMA strawweight champion Casey O'Neill at Eternal MMA 48 on October 4, 2019, in O'Neill's native Melbourne, Australia. O'Neill won the fight by unanimous decision, handing Motono her first professional loss.

Motono returned to Deep Jewels for her next bout, as she faced Nongpan Kanjana at Deep Jewels 28 on February 24, 2020. She won the fight by a first-round technical knockout, stopping Nongpan with grounded strikes.

==== Interim strawweight champion ====
Her 2–0 record with the promotion earned Motono the chance to face Asami Nakai for the Deep Jewels interim Strawweight Championship at Deep Jewels 29 on July 23, 2020. She won the fight by a first-round technical knockout, stopping Nakai with ground and pound near the end of the opening round.

As the full champion Mizuki Inoue was still competing in the UFC, Motono was booked to face the promotional newcomer Seika Izawa in a non-title bout at Deep Jewels 31 on December 19, 2020. She lost the fight by unanimous decision, with scores of 30–27, 30–27 and 29–28.

Izawa and Motono were expected to rematch for the interim Jewels strawweight championship at Deep Jewels 32 on March 7, 2021, before Motono withdrew due to a partial rupture of the ligament in her knee. The fight was rescheduled for Deep Jewels 33 on June 20, 2021. She lost the fight by submission, tapping to an armbar at the 3:32 minute mark of the first round.

==== Post title career ====
Motono faced Namiko Kawabata at Deep Jewels 35 on December 11, 2021. She successfully snapped her two-fight losing streak, as she won the fight by unanimous decision.

Motono dropped down to super atomweight in order to face Mizuki Oshiro at Deep Jewels 36 on March 12, 2022. She won the fight by a first-round submission, forcing Oshiro to tap in the last minute of the round. Following this victory, Fight Matrix ranked Motono as the tenth best atomweight in the world in their June 2022 rankings.

Motono faced Moeri Suda in a super atomweight bout at Deep Jewels 39 on November 23, 2022. She won the fight by unanimous decision.

== Championships and accomplishments ==
- DEEP JEWELS
  - Deep Jewels interim Strawweight Championship
- Pancrase
  - 2026 Pancrase Women's Strawweight Championship

== Mixed martial arts record ==
Professional record breakdown
16 matches	11 wins	5 losses
By knockout	3	0
By submission	2	2
By decision	6	3

Res.	Record	Opponent	Method	Event	Date	Round	Time	Location	Notes
Win	11–5	Satomi Takano	TKO (punches)	Pancrase 366	September 23, 2026	2	4:09	Tachikawa, Japan	Defended the Pancrase Women's Strawweight Championship.
Win	10–5	Karen	Decision (unanimous)	Pancrase 360	December 21, 2025	5	5:00	Tachikawa, Japan	Won the vacant Pancrase Women's Strawweight Championship.
Win	9–5	Emi Fujino	Decision (unanimous)	Pancrase 352	March 8, 2025	3	5:00	Yokohama, Japan	
Loss	8–5	Feng Xiaocan	Decision (unanimous)	Road to UFC Season 3: Episode 5	August 23, 2024	3	5:00	Las Vegas, Nevada, United States	Road to UFC Season 3 Women's Strawweight Tournament Semifinal.
Loss	8–4	Feng Xiaocan	Submission (armbar)	Happy Elephant: MMA Champions League 5	October 27, 2023	3	1:48	Nanjing, China	Return to Strawweight. For the vacant Happy Elephant Strawweight Championship.
Win	8–3	Moeri Suda	Decision (unanimous)	Deep Jewels 39	November 23, 2022	3	5:00	Tokyo, Japan	
Win	7–3	Mizuki Oshiro	Submission (armbar)	Deep Jewels 36	March 12, 2022	1	4:18	Tokyo, Japan	Super Atomweight debut.
Win	6–3	Namiko Kawabata	Decision (unanimous)	Deep Jewels 35	December 11, 2021	2	5:00	Tokyo, Japan	
Loss	5–3	Seika Izawa	Submission (armbar)	Deep Jewels 33	June 20, 2021	1	3:22	Tokyo, Japan	Lost the interim Jewels Strawweight Championship.
Loss	5–2	Seika Izawa	Decision (unanimous)	Deep Jewels 31	December 19, 2020	3	5:00	Tokyo, Japan	
Loss	5–1	Asami Nakai	TKO (Punches)	Deep Jewels 29	July 23, 2020	1	4:23	Tokyo, Japan	Won the interim Jewels Strawweight Championship.
Win	4–1	Nongpan Kanjana	TKO (Punches)	Deep Jewels 28	February 24, 2020	1	4:27	Tokyo, Japan	
Win	3–1	Park Ji-young	Submission (armbar)	DEEP 93 Impact	December 15, 2019	1	3:36	Tokyo, Japan	
Loss	2–1	Casey O'Neill	Decision (unanimous)	Eternal MMA 48	October 4, 2019	5	5:00	Melbourne, Australia	O'Neill missed weight (115.4 lb) and was stripped of the Eternal MMA Strawweight Championship. Only Motono was eligible to win the title.
Win	2–0	Mika Nagano	Decision (unanimous)	Deep Jewels 24	June 9, 2019	2	5:00	Tokyo, Japan	
Win	1–0	Mariya Suzuki	Decision (unanimous)	HEAT 44	March 2, 2019	2	5:00	Nagoya, Japan	Strawweight debut.

== See also ==
- List of female mixed martial artists
