= Namiko Kawabata =

Japanese mixed martial artist

- Born: February 28, 1987 (age 39); Ishikawa Prefecture, Japan
- Native name: 川畑 名美子
- Other names: HIME
- Nationality: Japanese
- Height: 5 ft 3 in (1.60 m)
- Weight: 108 lb (49 kg; 7 st 10 lb)
- Division: Atomweight
- Stance: Orthodox
- Fighting out of: Shūnan, Japan
- Team: Mouri Dojo
- Trainer: Akihiko Mori
- Years active: 2021–present

Mixed martial arts record
- Total: 12
- Wins: 7
- By knockout: 1
- By submission: 1
- By decision: 5
- Losses: 5
- By submission: 2
- By decision: 3

Other information
- Mixed martial arts record from Sherdog

Namiko Kawabata (Japanese: 川畑 名美子, born February 28, 1987), popularly known as HIME, is a Japanese mixed martial artist, currently competing in the super atomweight division of DEEP JEWELS.

== Mixed martial arts career ==
Kawabata made her professional debut, in a 55 kilogram catchweight bout, against Kate Oyama at Deep Jewels 32 on March 7, 2021. She won the fight by unanimous decision. Although all three judges scored the bout an even 19–19 draw, the victory was awarded to Kawabata due to the Jewels ruleset.

Kawabata made her strawweight debut against Shoko Fujita at Deep Jewels 33 on June 19, 2021. She won the fight by unanimous decision, with all three judges scoring the bout 20–17 in her favor.

Kawabata faced Miki Motono in the main event of Deep Jewels 35 on December 11, 2021. She lost the fight by unanimous decision.

After suffering the first loss of her professional career, Kawabata moved down to super atomweight, in order to face the reigning Jewels atomweight and the DEEP Microweight champion Saori Oshima in a non-title bout at Deep Jewels 36 on March 12, 2022. She won the fight by unanimous decision, with scores of 20–18, 20–18 and 20–17. Following this victory, Fight Matrix ranked her as the seventh best atomweight in the world, while Sherdog ranked her as the third best atomweight in the world.

Kawabata faced Yuko Kiryu at Deep Jewels 38 on September 11, 2022. She won the fight by a first-round technical knockout, the first stoppage victory of her professional career.

Kawabata was booked to face Machi Fukuda at Deep Jewels 40 on February 18, 2023. She lost the fight by a first-round submission.

Kawabata faced Si Woo Park at Deep Jewels 42 on September 10, 2023, losing the fight by unanimous decision.

Kawabata faced Rin Nakai at Deep Jewels 45 on May 26, 2024. She lost the fight by a third-round technical submission.

Kawabata faced Saki Kitamura at Deep Jewels 46 on September 8, 2024. She won the fight by unanimous decision, with three scorecards of 30—27 in her favor.

== Mixed martial arts record ==
Professional record breakdown
| 12 matches | 7 wins | 5 losses |
| By knockout | 1 | 0 |
| By submission | 1 | 2 |
| By decision | 5 | 3 |

| Res. | Record | Opponent | Method | Event | Date | Round | Time | Location | Notes |
|---|---|---|---|---|---|---|---|---|---|
| Win | 7–5 | Ayane Hirata | Decision (unanimous) | Rizin Landmark 15 | July 18, 2026 | 2 | 5:00 | Hiroshima, Japan | |
| Loss | 6–5 | Moeri Suda | Decision (unanimous) | DEEP Osaka Impact 2026 1st Round | March 8, 2026 | 3 | 5:00 | Osaka, Japan | |
| Win | 6–4 | Honoka Shigeta | Technical Submission (triangle armbar) | Deep Jewels 49 | May 25, 2025 | 2 | 3:00 | Tokyo, Japan | |
| Win | 5–4 | Saki Kitamura | Decision (unanimous) | Deep Jewels 46 | September 8, 2024 | 3 | 5:00 | Tokyo, Japan | |
| Loss | 4–4 | Rin Nakai | Technical Submission (guillotine choke) | Deep Jewels 45 | May 26, 2024 | 3 | 1:33 | Tokyo, Japan | Catchweight (128 lb) bout. |
| Loss | 4–3 | Park Si-woo | Decision (unanimous) | Deep Jewels 42 | September 10, 2023 | 3 | 5:00 | Tokyo, Japan | |
| Loss | 4–2 | Machi Fukuda | Submission (rear-naked choke) | Deep Jewels 40 | February 18, 2023 | 1 | 4:55 | Tokyo, Japan | Strawweight bout. |
| Win | 4–1 | Yuko Kiryu | TKO (punches) | Deep Jewels 38 | September 11, 2022 | 1 | 0:37 | Tokyo, Japan | |
| Win | 3–1 | Saori Oshima | Decision (unanimous) | Deep Jewels 36 | March 12, 2022 | 2 | 5:00 | Tokyo, Japan | Super Atomweight debut. |
| Loss | 2–1 | Miki Motono | Decision (unanimous) | Deep Jewels 35 | December 11, 2021 | 2 | 5:00 | Tokyo, Japan | |
| Win | 2–0 | Shoko Fujita | Decision (unanimous) | Deep Jewels 33 | June 19, 2021 | 2 | 5:00 | Tokyo, Japan | Strawweight debut. |
| Win | 1–0 | Kate Oyama | Decision (unanimous) | Deep Jewels 32 | March 7, 2021 | 2 | 5:00 | Tokyo, Japan | Catchweight (121 lb) bout. |

| Amateur record breakdown | | |
| 1 match | 0 wins | 1 loss |
| By decision | 0 | 1 |

| Res. | Record | Opponent | Method | Event | Date | Round | Time | Location | Notes |
|---|---|---|---|---|---|---|---|---|---|
| Loss | 0-1 | Mayu Kawanishi | Decision (Unanimous) | Deep Jewels 27 | 22 December 2019 | 2 | 3:00 | Osaka, Japan | |

== See also ==
- List of female mixed martial artists
