= Si Woo Park =

South Korean mixed martial artist

- Born: June 26, 1991 (age 35); Busan, South Korea
- Native name: 박시우
- Other names: Korean Queen Bee
- Nationality: South Korea
- Height: 5 ft 2 in (1.57 m)
- Weight: 104.9 lb (48 kg; 7 st 7 lb)
- Division: Atomweight
- Style: Taekwondo
- Fighting out of: Busan, South Korea
- Team: Busan Team MAD (2017 - 2021); Krazy Bee (2021-2024); HAVAS (2025-present)
- Rank: 4th Dan black belt in Taekwondo
- Years active: 2017 – present

Kickboxing record
- Total: 1
- Losses: 1

Mixed martial arts record
- Total: 20
- Wins: 14
- By knockout: 3
- By decision: 11
- Losses: 6
- By submission: 1
- By decision: 5

Other information
- Mixed martial arts record from Sherdog

Park Si-woo (born 26 June 1991), anglicized as Si Woo Park is a South Korean mixed martial artist, currently competing in the atomweight division of Jewels. She is the former Jewels Strawweight champion.

As of January 3, 2022, Fight Matrix ranks her as the eight best atomweight in the world, while Sherdog ranks her as the seventh best atomweight in the world.

== Mixed martial arts career ==
=== Early career ===
Park made her professional debut against Jeong Eun Park at Road FC 042 x Chungju World Martial Arts Festival on September 23, 2017. Park won the fight by unanimous decision.

Park was scheduled to face Sayako Fujita at GRACHAN 35 on May 27, 2018. Fujita won the fight by unanimous decision.

Park returned to Japan for her next fight, as she was scheduled to fight Emi Tomimatsu at DEEP 85 Impact on August 26, 2018. She notched her first professional victory, prevailing over Tomimatsu by unanimous decision.

Park faced Jae Choi at KAISER 02 in her fourth professional fight. Park extended her winning streak to two fights, winning once again by decision.

=== Deep Jewels ===
Park was scheduled to fight Hikaru Aono at DEEP 93 Impact on December 15, 2019. She won the fight by a first-round technical knockout.

Park was next scheduled to face Saori Oshima at Deep Jewels 31 on December 19, 2020. Park won the closely contested bout by unanimous decision.

Park participated in the Deep Jewels atomweight Grand Prix, which was held to crown a new champion, as the title was left vacant after Tomo Maesawa retired. Park was scheduled to face Mizuki Oshiro in the tournament quarterfinals at Deep Jewels 32 on March 7, 2021. Park won the fight by unanimous decision, extending her winning streak to five fights. Advancing to the tournament semifinals, Park fought a rematch with Saori Oshima at Deep Jewels 33 on June 19, 2021. Although she managed to knock Oshima down midway through the first round, Oshima was able to snatch an armbar from the bottom, winning by way of submission.

Park was scheduled to face the undefeated Seika Izawa at DEEP 104 Impact on October 23, 2021. Park lost the fight by unanimous decision, with scores of 28-27, 29-26, 29-26. Fight Matrix ranked her as a top ten atomweight between January 3, 2021 and July 4, 2021, peaking at #5 in April 2021. She exited the rankings following her loss to Izawa.

=== Rizin FF ===
Park faced the 2017 Rizin Women's Super Atomweight (49 kg) tournament runner-Up Rena Kubota at Rizin 33 - Saitama on December 31, 2021. Park won the fight by unanimous decision.

Park was expected to face Aira Koga at Deep Jewels 36 on March 12, 2022. The fight was later postponed for Deep Jewels 37 on April 9, 2022. Park won the fight by unanimous decision, with all three judges scoring the bout 30–27 in her favor.

==== 2022 Super Atomweight Grand Prix ====
Park faced the 2017 Rizin Women's Super Atomweight Grand Prix Winner Kanna Asakura at Rizin 37 - Saitama on July 31, 2022, in the quarterfinal bout of the Rizin Super Atomweight Grand Prix. Aside from the tournament title, a prize of ¥7,000,000 was on the line for the eventual winner as well. Park won the fight by a dominant unanimous decision.

Park faced the former two-time Rizin Super Atomweight Championship titleholder Ayaka Hamasaki in the tournament semifinals, which were held at Rizin 38 on September 25, 2022. She won the fight by unanimous decision.

Park rematched Seika Izawa in the final of the Rizin Super Atomweight Grand Prix on December 31, 2022 at Rizin 40. She lost the close bout via split decision.

==== Return to DEEP ====
Park faced Namiko Kawabata at Deep Jewels 42 on September 10, 2023, winning the fight by unanimous decision.

Park faced Princess The Rocket at DEEP 117 Impact on December 10, 2023. She won the fight by a first-round technical knockout.

Park faced face Machi Fukuda for the interim Jewels Strawweight Championship at Deep Jewels 45 on May 26, 2024. She won the fight by a split decision.

The reigning Jewels Strawweight champion Seika Izawa formally vacated her title on July 11, 2025, after which Park was promoted to undisputed status. Park made her first title defense against Machi Fukuda at DEEP JEWELS 50 on September 7, 2025. She lost the fight by split decision.

== Kickboxing career ==
As an amateur kickboxer, Park captured gold medals at the 2012 WAKO Asian Championships and the 2013 Asian Indoor and Martial Arts Games, both times as an atomweight in the full contact category. Park made her professional kickboxing debut against Panchan Rina at REBELS 61 on June 9, 2019. Rina won the fight by unanimous decision.

== Championships and accomplishments ==
- Jewels
  - interim Jewels Strawweight Championship (One time; former)
  - Jewels Strawweight Championship (One time; former)

== Fight record ==
=== Mixed martial arts record ===
Professional record breakdown
20 matches	14 wins	6 losses
By knockout	3	0
By submission	0	1
By decision	11	5

Res.	Record	Opponent	Method	Event	Date	Round	Time	Location	Notes
Win	14–6	Moeri Suda	Decision (unanimous)	Rizin Landmark 15	July 18, 2026	3	5:00	Hiroshima, Japan	
Win	13–6	Saki Kitamura	TKO (punches)	Deep Jewels 51	November 23, 2025	2	3:22	Tokyo, Japan	
Loss	12–6	Machi Fukuda	Decision (split)	Deep Jewels 50	September 7, 2025	3	5:00	Tokyo, Japan	Lost the Jewels Strawweight Championship.
Win	12–5	Machi Fukuda	Decision (split)	Deep Jewels 45	May 26, 2024	3	5:00	Tokyo, Japan	Won the interim Jewels Strawweight Championship. Later promoted to undisputed champion.
Win	11–5	Princess The Rocket	TKO (knee and punches)	DEEP 117 Impact	December 10, 2023	1	2:07	Tokyo, Japan	
Win	10–5	Namiko Kawabata	Decision (unanimous)	Deep Jewels 42	September 10, 2023	3	5:00	Tokyo, Japan	Strawweight debut.
Loss	9–5	Seika Izawa	Decision (split)	Rizin 40	December 31, 2022	3	5:00	Saitama, Japan	2022 Rizin Super Atomweight Grand Prix Final.
Win	9–4	Ayaka Hamasaki	Decision (unanimous)	Rizin 38	September 25, 2022	3	5:00	Saitama, Japan	2022 Rizin Super Atomweight Grand Prix Semifinal.
Win	8–4	Kanna Asakura	Decision (unanimous)	Rizin 37	July 31, 2022	3	5:00	Saitama, Japan	2022 Rizin Super Atomweight Grand Prix Quarterfinal.
Win	7–4	Aira Koga	Decision (unanimous)	DEEP Cage Impact In Osaka 2022	April 9, 2022	3	5:00	Osaka, Japan	
Win	6–4	Rena Kubota	Decision (unanimous)	Rizin 33	December 31, 2021	3	5:00	Saitama, Japan	Catchweight (110 lb) bout.
Loss	5–4	Seika Izawa	Decision (unanimous)	DEEP 104 Impact	October 23, 2021	3	5:00	Tokyo, Japan	Super Atomweight (108 lb) debut.
Loss	5–3	Saori Oshima	Technical Submission (armbar)	Deep Jewels 33	June 20, 2021	1	2:28	Tokyo, Japan	Jewels Atomweight Grand Prix Semifinal.
Win	5–2	Mizuki Oshiro	Decision (unanimous)	Deep Jewels 32	March 7, 2021	2	5:00	Tokyo, Japan	Jewels Atomweight Grand Prix Quarterfinal.
Win	4–2	Saori Oshima	Decision (unanimous)	Deep Jewels 31	December 19, 2020	3	5:00	Tokyo, Japan	
Win	3–2	Hikaru Aono	TKO (punches)	DEEP 93 Impact	December 19, 2019	3	5:00	Tokyo, Japan	
Win	2–2	Choi Jae	Decision (unanimous)	KAISER 02	December 8, 2018	2	5:00	Andong, South Korea	
Win	1–2	Emi Tomimatsu	Decision (unanimous)	DEEP 85 Impact	August 26, 2018	3	5:00	Tokyo, Japan	
Loss	0–2	Sayako Fujita	Decision (unanimous)	Grachan 35 / 1MC Vol. 6	May 27, 2018	2	5:00	Tokyo, Japan	
Loss	0–1	Park Jeong-eun	Decision (unanimous)	Road FC 042 x Chungju World Martial Arts Festival	September 23, 2017	2	5:00	Chungju, South Korea	Atomweight debut.

=== Kickboxing record ===
Professional Kickboxing Record
0 Wins (0 (T)KO's), 1 Loss, 0 Draw, 0 No Contest
Date	Result	Opponent	Event	Location	Method	Round	Time
2019-06-09	Loss	(Japan) Panchan Rina	REBELS 61	Fukuoka, Japan	Decision (Unanimous)	3	2:00
Legend: Win Loss Draw/No contest Notes

== See also ==
- List of female mixed martial artists
