= Gabi Garcia =

Brazilian mixed martial artist and grappler (born 1985)

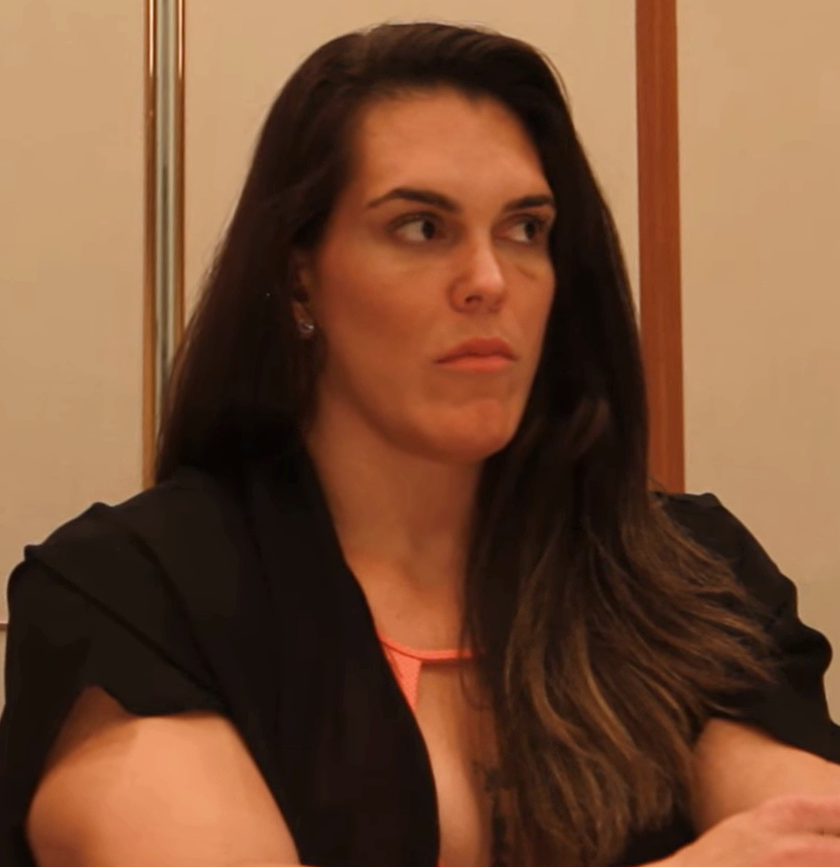
- Gabi Garcia in 2016
- Born: Gabrielle Lemos Garcia; November 17, 1985 (age 40); Porto Alegre, Brazil
- Height: 187 cm (6 ft 2 in)
- Weight: 95 kg (209 lb; 14 st 13 lb)
- Style: Brazilian jiu-jitsu
- Team: Alliance Jiu Jitsu
- Rank: BJJ black belt Judo black belt
- Years active: 2008–present

Mixed martial arts record
- Total: 7
- Wins: 6
- By knockout: 2
- By submission: 4
- Losses: 0
- No contests: 1

Other information
- Mixed martial arts record from Sherdog

Gabrielle Lemos "Gabi" Garcia (born November 17, 1985) is a Brazilian mixed martial artist and grappler. She is one of the most successful competitors of all time in the female black belt divisions, and a member of the IBJJF Hall of Fame.

== Early life ==
Garcia was born on November 17, 1985, in Porto Alegre, Rio Grande do Sul, Brazil. Garcia's early and mid-teens were spent playing sports including volleyball, team handball, and field hockey. At age 13, Garcia and her family moved to São Paulo. Around this age, Garcia's uncle helped begin her training in jiu-jitsu. Before eventually committing herself full-time to a jiu-jitsu career, Garcia was in her final year of a university course study in advertising.

== Jiu-jitsu and grappling career ==
Garcia trains in São Paulo with Fabio Gurgel, at the Alliance team, where she has achieved four Abu Dhabi Combat Club championships and nine World Jiu-Jitsu Championships.

Garcia's results from the 2013 IBJJF World Jiu-Jitsu Championships were automatically disqualified when she tested positive for the fertility drug Clomiphene, which is on the USADA banned list. After a case review, Garcia was found not at fault, no suspension was given and she remained eligible to compete.

=== 2019–2021 ===
In 2019, Garcia became the first woman to win four ADCC gold medals with a submission in the finals against Carina Santi.

At Who's Number One (WNO) on February 26, 2021, Garcia faced Nathiely de Jesus in the rubber match of a trilogy. Garcia had previously beaten de Jesus at the 2019 Pan Championship and de Jesus beat Garcia at F2W 121 later that year, both in the gi. De Jesus beat Garcia at WNO by unanimous decision, becoming the first woman to beat Garcia with and without a gi. After the loss, Garcia challenged Gordon Ryan. ADCC medalist Craig Jones verbally agreed to compete against her in an intergender match.

Garcia returned to WNO for a championship tournament on September 25, 2021. She faced Amanda Leve in the first round, losing to the 5'6" Leve by unanimous decision. The result was labeled an upset due to the smaller Leve controlling the majority of the match and putting Garcia into several deep rear-naked choke attempts.

At the 2021 IBJJF World Championships in December, Garcia was submitted for the first time in the history of her competitive career at black belt by Yara Soares. Garcia retired from IBJJF competition at the conclusion of the competition.

=== 2022–2024 ===
Garcia was invited to compete at the 2022 ADCC World Championship in the over 60 kg division once again. She submitted Nikki Lloyd-Griffiths in the opening round with an armbar, but then lost to Amy Campo on points in the semi-final. She won the bronze medal by default after Kendall Reusing was injured in her match and unable to compete.

On March 30, 2023, Garcia was promoted to black belt in judo.

Garcia was invited to compete in the over 65 kg division of the 2024 ADCC World Championship on August 17–18, 2024. However, Craig Jones then announced on an episode of the Joe Rogan Experience that he would be competing against Garcia in an intergender superfight at The Craig Jones Invitational on August 16–17, 2024. After refusing to tap to a heel hook, Garcia lost the match by submission to a rear-naked choke.

=== Instructor lineage ===
Jigoro Kano → Tomita Tsunejirō → Mitsuyo Maeda → Carlos Gracie Sr. → Hélio Gracie → Rolls Gracie → Romero Cavalcanti → Fábio Gurgel → Gabi Garcia

== Mixed martial arts ==
Garcia appeared as a guest coach for Wanderlei Silva on The Ultimate Fighter: Brazil 3.

Garcia was at one point scheduled to face Megumi Yabushita for the Japanese promotion Real Fight Championship. This bout, however, fell through.

Garcia was then scheduled to make her MMA debut with Jungle Fight in March 2015. However, this bout also didn't happen.

On November 6, 2015, it was announced during Bellator 145 that Garcia would face Lei'D Tapa for Rizin Fighting Federation on December 31, 2015. Garcia won the fight via TKO in the first round.

In her second fight for the promotion, Garcia faced Anna Malyukova at Rizin Fighting Federation 1 on April 17, 2016. She won the fight via armbar submission in the second round.

For her third fight with Rizin, Garcia faced Destanie Yarbrough at Rizin World Grand-Prix 2016: 1st Round on September 25, 2016. She won the fight via americana submission in the first round.

Garcia was scheduled to face Shinobu Kandori at Rizin 4: Rizin Fighting World Grand Prix 2016: Final Round on December 31, 2016. However, Kandori pulled out of the bout due to an injury and was replaced by Yumiko Hotta. Garcia won the bout via TKO in the first round.

Garcia next faced Russian boxer Oksana Gagloeva on July 30, 2017, at Rizin 6. The bout ended in a no contest due to an eye poke that occurred just fourteen seconds into the first round.

Garcia was scheduled to face Shinobu Kandori on December 29 at Rizin World Grand Prix 2017: 2nd Round, but the fight was canceled when Garcia missed weight by 28 pounds.

Garcia faced Barbara Nepomuceno at Rizin 14 on December 31, 2018, in a 226 lb catchweight bout. She won the fight via submission in the first round.

=== Return ===
In 2023, Garcia announced that she would be returning to professional MMA competition and that she would be competing at 195 lbs. She then confirmed on February 19, 2024 that she had agreed a contract for a heavyweight title-fight in her return to the sport. It was later announced that she would be facing Barbara Nepomuceno in a rematch at Centurion FC 19 on April 25, 2024. The fight was cancelled when Garcia's family was affected by floods in Brazil.

== Shoot boxing ==
Garcia made her shoot boxing debut on July 7, 2017, when she faced Megumi Yabushita at Shoot Boxing Girl's S-Cup 2017. The bout was declared a no contest after twice hitting Yabushita with illegal soccer kicks when her opponent fell to the ground.

== Personal life ==
Gabi Garcia is married to Bruno Almeida, but on May 30, 2023, she publicly accused him of committing fraud, financial abuse, and physical abuse. In 2024, Garcia was recognised for multiple achievements in the Guinness Book of World Records.

== Mixed martial arts record ==
Professional record breakdown
7 matches	6 wins	0 losses
By knockout	2	0
By submission	4	0
No contests	1	

Res.	Record	Opponent	Method	Event	Date	Round	Time	Location	Notes
Win	6–0 (1)	Barbara Nepomuceno	Submission (keylock)	Rizin 14	December 31, 2018	1	2:35	Saitama, Japan	Catchweight (226 lb) bout.
Win	5–0 (1)	Veronika Futina	Submission (rear-naked choke)	Road FC 047	May 12, 2018	1	3:49	Beijing, China	Openweight bout.
NC	4–0 (1)	Oksana Gagloeva	NC (accidental eye poke)	Rizin World Grand Prix 2017: Opening Round – Part 1	July 30, 2017	1	0:14	Saitama, Japan	Accidental eyepoke rendered Gagloeva unable to continue.
Win	4–0	Yumiko Hotta	TKO (punches)	Rizin World Grand Prix 2016: Final Round	December 31, 2016	1	0:41	Saitama, Japan	Openweight bout.
Win	3–0	Destanie Yarbrough	Submission (keylock)	Rizin World Grand-Prix 2016: 1st Round	September 25, 2016	1	2:42	Saitama, Japan	
Win	2–0	Anna Malyukova	Submission (armbar)	Rizin 1	April 17, 2016	2	2:04	Nagoya, Japan	Heavyweight debut.
Win	1-0	Lei'D Tapa	TKO (punches)	Rizin World Grand Prix 2015: Part 2 - Iza	December 31, 2015	1	2:36	Saitama, Japan	Light Heavyweight debut.

== Shoot boxing record ==
Shoot boxing record
0 Wins, 0 Losses, 1 No Contest
Date	Result	Opponent	Event	Location	Method	Round	Time
2017-07-07	NC	(Japan) Megumi Yabushita	Shoot Boxing Girl's S-Cup 2017	Tokyo, Japan	No Contest (illegal soccer kicks)	1	N/A
Legend: Win Loss Draw/No contest Notes
