= Destanie Yarbrough =

American mixed martial arts fighter

- Born: July 12, 1990 (age 36)
- Nationality: American
- Height: 5 ft 7 in (170 cm)
- Weight: 218 lb (99 kg; 15 st 8 lb)
- Style: Muay Thai, Boxing, BJJ, Wrestling, Shootboxing,
- Team: Buhawe Fighting Alliance
- Years active: 2016–present

Mixed martial arts record
- Total: 3
- Wins: 2
- By knockout: 1
- By decision: 1
- Losses: 1
- By submission: 1

Destanie Yarbrough is an American professional martial artist, specializing in Muay Thai. She competes in the Heavyweight (MMA) division.

== Background ==
Destanie Yarbrough was born on July 12, 1990. She won a college scholarship for track and field to California State University, Long Beach, later transferring to Fresno State for track and field.

Yarbrough was a star running back for the Central Cal War Angels of the Women's Football Alliance until the team was dissolved in November 2017. She became a pro fighter in 2016.

Yarbrough trains in Fresno, California, at the Halo Jiu Jitsu Training Center.

Yarbrough has advocated for the women's heavyweight and openweight divisions in mixed martial arts. In a 2017 interview, she said that fans outside the United States were more accepting of female heavyweight and openweight fighters, and that she felt such fighters were seen as a "joke" by some promoters and organizations. She said she hoped the divisions would grow, and that she and other fighters would keep going until they could claim a championship belt.

== Mixed martial arts career ==
For her first heavyweight fight, Yarbrough faced Crystal Parson at The Warriors Cage 24 in Porterville California on April 1, 2016. She won by technical knockout (doctor stoppage) in the first round.

For her second heavyweight fight, Yarbrough faced Gabi Garcia at Rizin World Grand-Prix 2016: 1st Round on September 25, 2016. She lost the fight via Americana submission in the first round.

For her third fight, Yarbrough faced Begimzhan Kasymova at 2017 in Road FC on Dec 23, 2017. She won the fight via decision in the second round.

== Mixed martial arts record ==
Professional record breakdown
4 matches	2 wins	1 loss
By knockout	1	0
By submission	1	1
No contests	1	
