= Hostěradice =

- Municipality
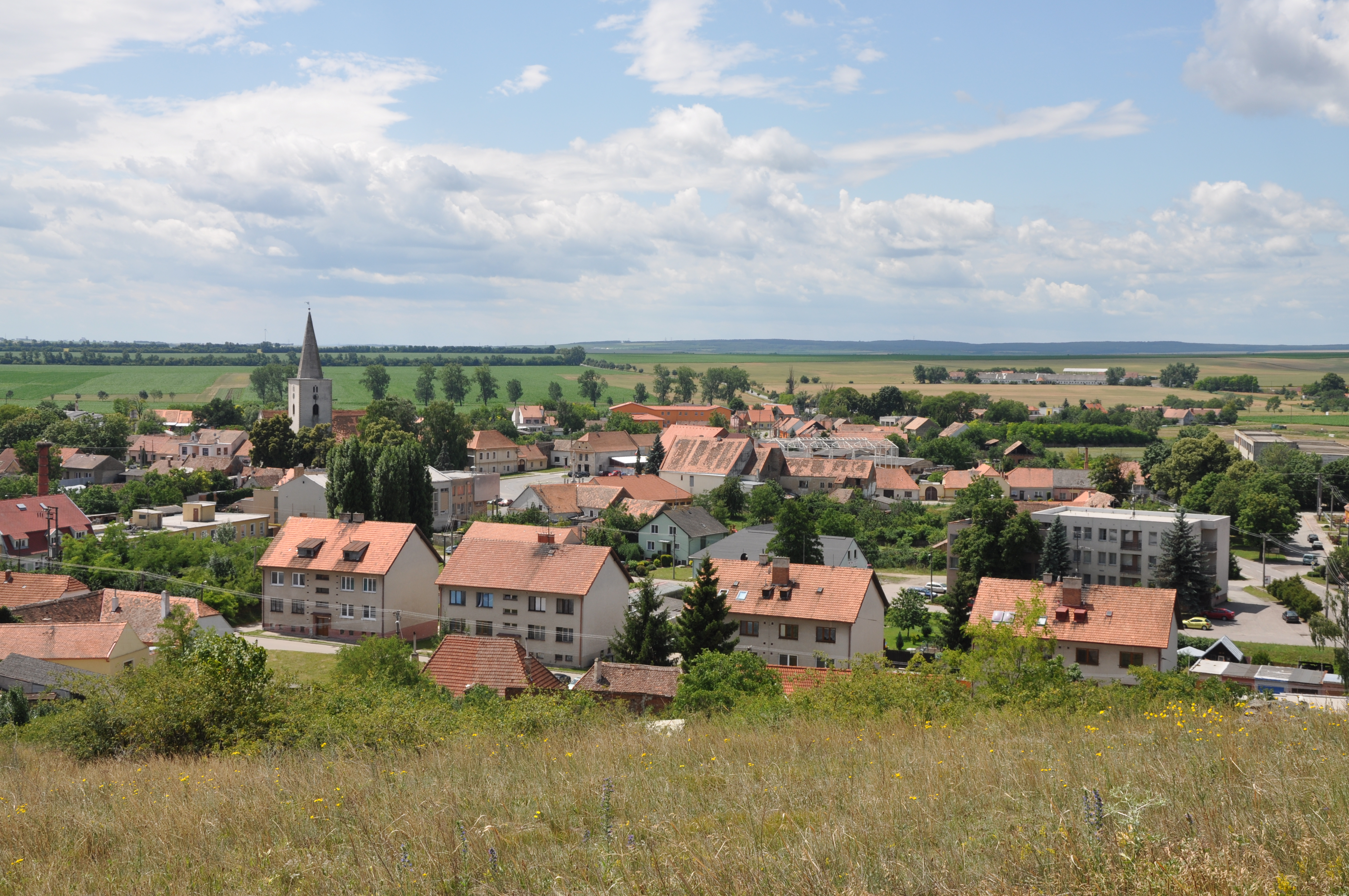
- General view

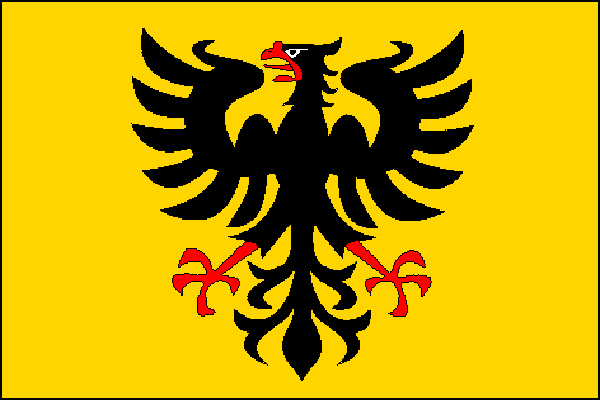
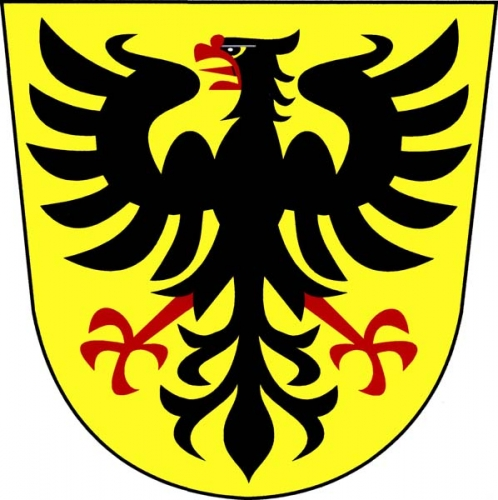
- Flag Coat of arms

- Location in the Czech Republic
- Coordinates: 48°57′0″N 16°15′34″E
- Country: Czech Republic
- Region: South Moravian
- District: Znojmo
- First mentioned: 1200

Area
  - Total: 27.45 km^{2} (10.60 sq mi)
- Elevation: 212 m (696 ft)

Population (2026-01-01)
  - Total: 1,671
  - Density: 60.87/km^{2} (157.7/sq mi)
- Time zone: UTC+1 (CET)
  - Summer (DST): UTC+2 (CEST)
- Postal code: 671 71
- Website: www.hosteradice.cz

Hostěradice is a municipality and village in Znojmo District in the South Moravian Region of the Czech Republic. It has about 1,700 inhabitants.

Hostěradice lies approximately 20 kilometres (12 mi) north-east of Znojmo, 39 km (24 mi) south-west of Brno, and 185 km (115 mi) south-east of Prague.

== Administrative division ==
Hostěradice consists of three municipal parts (in brackets population according to the 2021 census):

- Hostěradice (1,009)
- Chlupice (339)
- Míšovice (274)

== Demographics ==
Historical population
Year	Pop.	±%
1869	2,034	—
1880	1,883	−7.4%
1890	2,021	+7.3%
1900	2,043	+1.1%
1910	2,051	+0.4%
1921	1,964	−4.2%
1930	1,987	+1.2%
1950	1,551	−21.9%
1961	1,506	−2.9%
1970	1,456	−3.3%
1980	1,487	+2.1%
1991	1,420	−4.5%
2001	1,461	+2.9%
2011	1,428	−2.3%
2021	1,622	+13.6%
Source: Censuses

== Notable people ==
- Jiří Procházka (born 1992), mixed martial artist
