= Advertising education =

Advertising has been taught around the world for over 100 years.There is no single definition of advertising education. For example, the American Academy of Advertising defines it as education only at universities while Advertising Educational Foundation understands it as educating people in general.

Advertising education began with three independent disciplines: psychology, business and journalism. The oldest one is psychology and has been studied since 1862 at the University of Heidelberg. The first classes in business were offered in the University of Louisiana, (nowadays Tulane University). The earliest marketing course started in 1901 at the University of Michigan. The first person who implemented a plan for a school of journalism was General Robert E.Lee in 1869.

== Historical development ==
The first advertising education courses were implemented in correspondence schools in the end of 19th century. At Universities Advertising was only discussed a little in marketing and rarely in journalism. Only in psychology advertising was an important topic. The final reason that played a significant role for ad education to be studied was speech of an advertising club player in Chicago. “The Psychology of Involuntary Attention as Applied to Advertising” addressed the director of Psychological Laboratory in Northwestern University and after that became popular even outside of Chicago and as a result set university advertising education in motion.

Originating at New York University with the course "Advertising", the subject is now offered through certificate, bachelors, masters, and doctorate programs in over 150 academic institutions.

== Advertising organizations ==
Along with advertising's role in higher education, professional advertising associations such as American Advertising Federation, American Association of Advertising Agencies (AAAA) provide a variety of educational programs to students and working professionals. Academic and research based organizations, such as the American Academy and the Advertising Education Foundation work to research advertising, its functions and its future, as well as provide a variety of educational resources to students. The AAAA started the publishment of the Journal of Advertising in 1972 in order to support knowledge dissemination.

== Teaching methods ==
An emerging platform for advertising education is the student-run advertising agency, an education-based marketing partnership between a for-profit company and a student group or a classroom. This method of teaching advertising fuses academic theories with practical applications.
