= Baruto Kaito =

Estonian sumo wrestler and politician

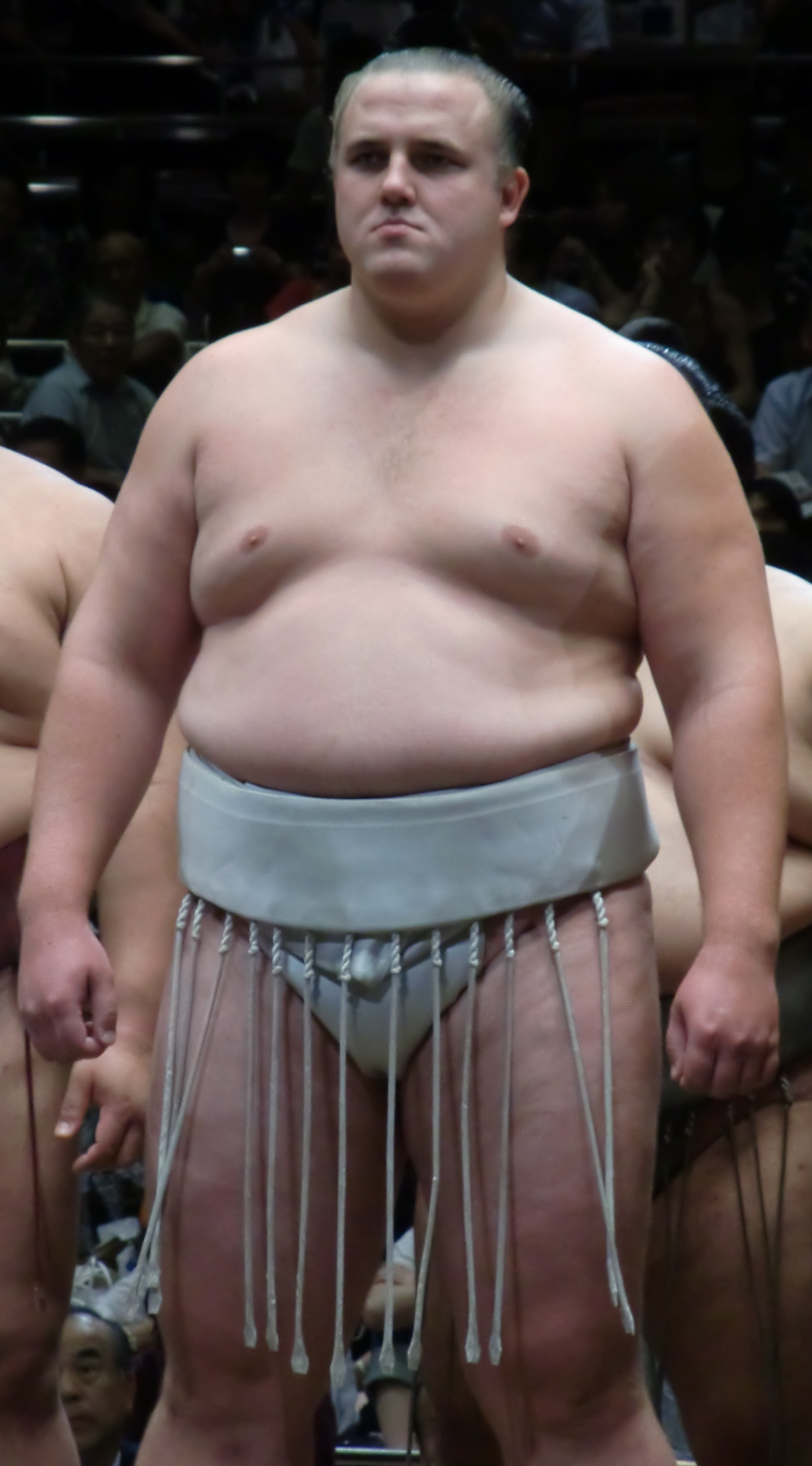
- Baruto in 2011

Personal information
- Native name: 把瑠都 凱斗
- Born: Kaido Höövelson; 5 November 1984 (age 42) Väike-Maarja, Lääne-Viru County, then part of Estonian SSR, Soviet Union
- Height: 1.99 m (6 ft 6 1/2 in)
- Weight: 183 kg (403 lb; 28.8 st)

Sport
- Sport: Sumo
- Retired: September 2013
- Heya: Mihogaseki → Onoe
- Record: 431-213-102
- Debut: May 2004
- Highest rank: Ōzeki (May 2010)
- Championships: 1 (Makuuchi); 3 (Jūryō); 1 (Makushita); 1 (Jonidan); 1 (Jonokuchi)
- Special Prizes: Fighting Spirit (5); Outstanding Performance (1); Technique (1)

Kaido Höövelson (born 5 November 1984), known professionally as Baruto Kaito (把瑠都 凱斗), is an Estonian politician and former professional sumo wrestler. He made his wrestling debut in May 2004 and in two years, reached the top division in May 2006. After suffering a number of injury problems in 2007 which delayed his progress, he reached the third-highest rank of sekiwake in November 2008, and was promoted to ōzeki rank after finishing the March 2010 tournament with a score of 14–1. He was a tournament runner-up four times before recording a top division championship in the 2012 January tournament. During his career Baruto also earned five special prizes for Fighting Spirit, one for Outstanding Performance and one for Technique. He lost his ōzeki rank after more injury problems at the end of 2012, and having fallen greatly in rank after withdrawing from the May 2013 tournament, he announced his retirement in September of that year at the age of 28.

After retirement from sumo, Höövelson has been involved in different business ventures, mixed martial arts, acting, and politics. In March 2019 he was elected to the Riigikogu.

== Early life and sumo background ==
Höövelson was born in Väike-Maarja, but grew up in the nearby Rohu village in current Vinni Parish. His family owned a cattle farm and he became accustomed to hard physical labour as a child. His father died when Höövelson was sixteen years old and he worked as a nightclub bouncer to earn a living.

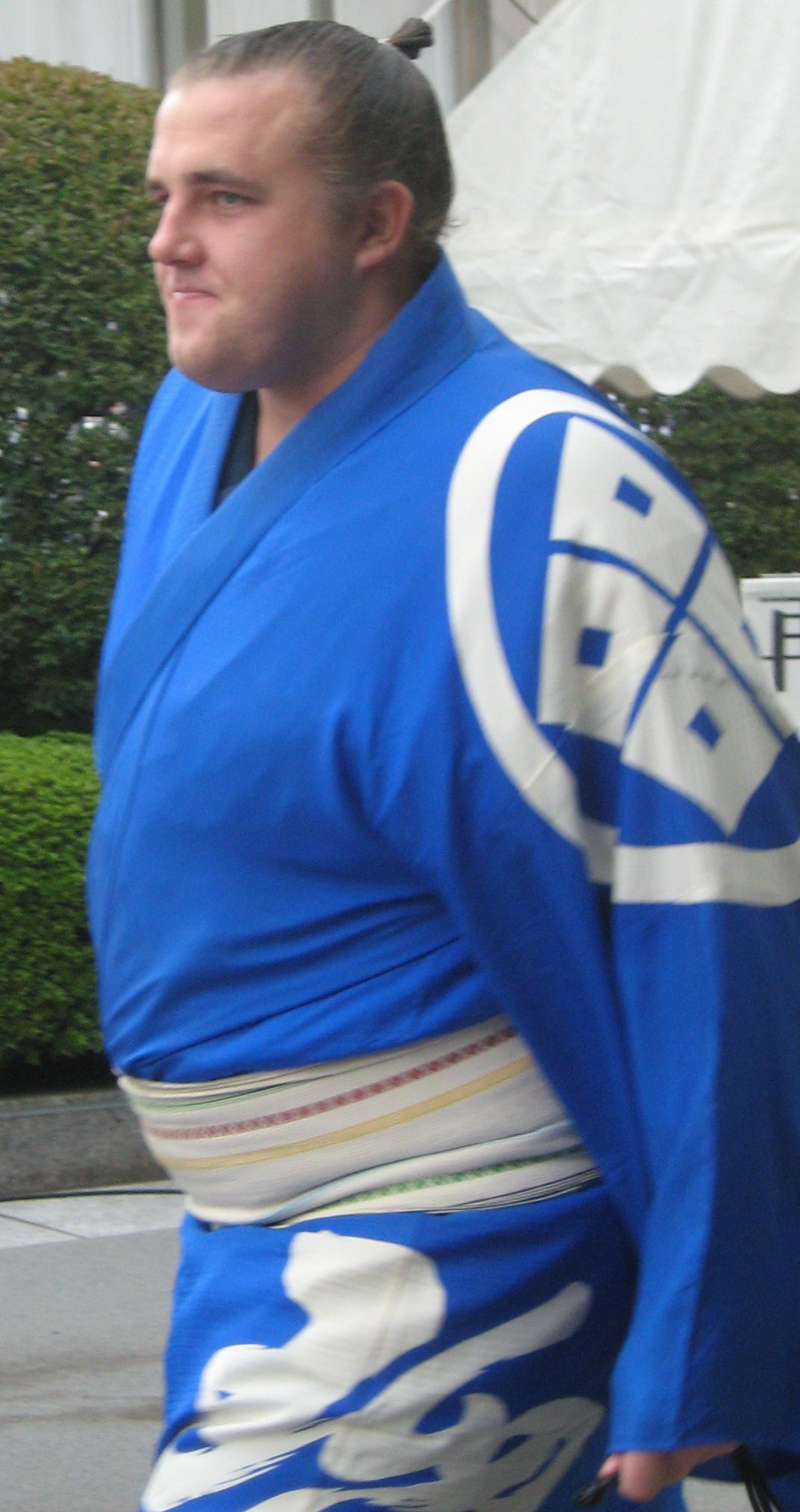
Baruto outside a September 2008 tournament

He played basketball as a teenager and also won a national judo championship in Estonia.

He was introduced to amateur sumo when he was a little boy through his judo coach Riho Rannikmaa, and an official from the Kagoshima Prefecture Sumo Association, Kazuo Kurazono, encouraged him to join the professional sport. Due to the restrictions on foreigners entering sumo, the only stable with a place available was Mihogaseki. He came to Japan with a friend from Estonia, Ott Juurikas, who entered Irumagawa stable and fought under the name of Kitaoji but quit after only one tournament. Höövelson was given the shikona or fighting name of Baruto, a reference to the Japanese name of the Baltic Sea, and made his professional debut in May 2004. He moved very quickly up the rankings, reaching the jūryō division after only eight tournaments (tied for the third-fastest rise to sekitori status since 1958 when the current six-tournament-a-year format was adopted) and compiling a record of 41–8 on the way.

After falling out of the jūryō division in November 2005, Baruto secured the makushita championship by winning out in a rare seven-way playoff, followed by a perfect 15–0 record for the jūryō title in March 2006. This was only the fourth time ever that a jūryō wrestler has won the championship with such a record. He was the first to achieve this since Kitanofuji, who ultimately reached the top yokozuna rank, in 1963. As a result of this performance he was promoted to makuuchi, the highest division, for the first time in his career in May 2006. It is likely that Baruto could have achieved a more rapid rise to the top division, were it not for him suffering from appendicitis in November 2005, the resulting absence from the tournament sending him back down to the third-highest makushita division temporarily. Despite this, his rise to the top division in two years is equal to the second-fastest ever.

== Top division career ==
In his first tournament in the top division Baruto scored a strong 11–4 record and won the kantō-shō (or Fighting Spirit Prize). After a second winning record in July and another promotion, Baruto's quick ascent through the ranks halted at maegashira 1. He withdrew from the September tournament with an injury, which lowered his standing to maegashira 6 in the November tournament. The result of 10–5 there took him up to maegashira 3, but he was again injured in the January 2007 tournament. He suffered a ruptured anterior cruciate ligament in his left knee. He was unable to compete in the March tournament as well and his ranking suffered, resulting in a return to the jūryō ranks. In May he won the jūryō championship with a 14–1 record, resulting in an immediate return to makuuchi in July to the position of maegashira 14 East. However, he re-injured his knee on the opening day and decided to withdraw from the tournament. It was the third time he had injured the knee, each time in a different place. He opted against surgery, which would have required a lengthy lay-off.

In September 2007, despite being clearly still troubled by his knee, he took his third jūryō division championship with a 13–2 record. This was enough to earn promotion back to the top division for November. He was in contention for the championship until the final days of the tournament when he was defeated by ōzeki Chiyotaikai and komusubi Ama. He finished with an 11–4 record and was awarded his second Fighting Spirit Prize.

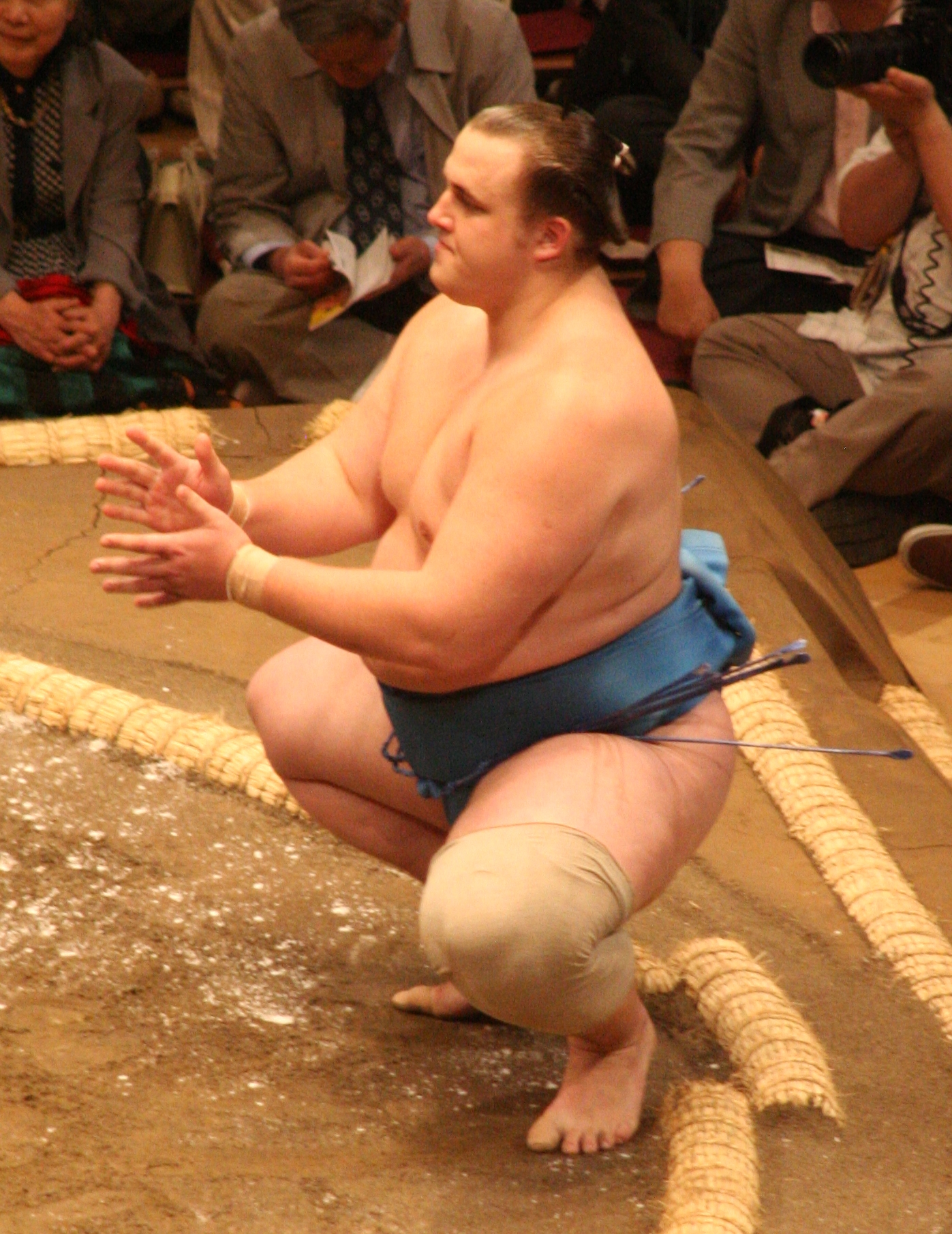
Baruto in May 2009

In the January 2008 tournament Baruto produced a 7–8 score, the first time in his career that he has completed a tournament and finished with more losses than wins. He performed much better in March, finishing as joint runner-up with 12 wins and being awarded another Fighting Spirit Prize. In the May 2008 tournament he was unable to defeat any of the top rankers and could only manage five wins. In the July 2008 tournament, Baruto finished with a 10–5 score, assuring a komusubi debut in September.

In his first appearance as komusubi in the September tournament, Baruto managed an 8–7 score, while having a less than perfect start to the tournament. He was just 2–7 after 9 bouts where he competed with only the titled ranks of san'yaku wrestlers. His last six matches were against wrestlers from the maegashira ranks and there Baruto managed to hold his ground. He was promoted to sekiwake rank for the Kyushu Basho in November, as the west sekiwake Toyonoshima could not hold his position after a 6–9 finish in the Aki Basho, thus leaving an opening for the position. He came through with a winning record in his sekiwake debut.

Baruto had an excellent start to the January 2009 tournament, winning his first six matches. However, he began losing in the second week and finished on 9–6. By contrast, he struggled during the first week of the March tournament in facing the top ranked wrestlers and stood at 3–6 after nine days, but he maintained his rank with a kachi-koshi victory on the final day. He is the first sekiwake to hold his rank for four straight tournaments since his debut since Asashōryū in 2002. He lost the rank in May 2009, but fighting from the maegashira 3 position in July he produced a strong 11–4 record and returned to the komusubi rank for the September tournament. There he became the first non-yokozuna since Hoshi in 1986 to defeat five ōzeki in one tournament. He finished with a fine 12–3 record, guaranteeing his return to sekiwake, and was awarded his fourth Fighting Spirit prize. He scored nine wins in the next tournament.

=== Ōzeki promotion ===
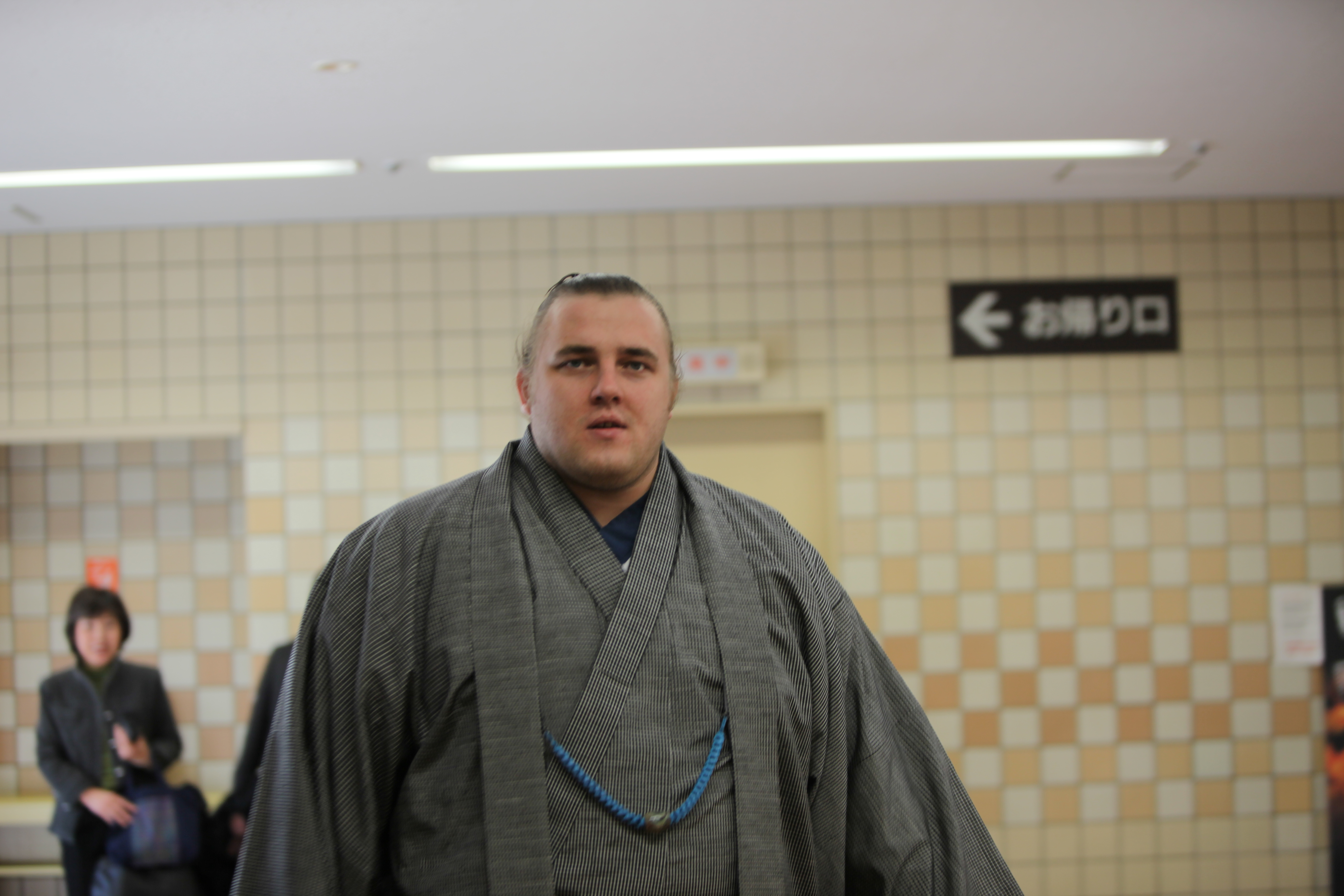
Baruto at the January 2010 basho in Tokyo

On the seventh day of the January 2010 tournament he finally managed to defeat a yokozuna, Hakuhō, by sukuinage, or beltless arm throw, his first win over a yokozuna in nineteen attempts. This earned him his first Outstanding Performance award, and he finished on 12–3. He became only the third wrestler to compile 33 wins over three tournaments in a san'yaku rank and not be promoted to ōzeki, following Kotogahama in 1957 and Miyabiyama (twice) in 2006. At the March tournament in Osaka it was indicated by Sumo Association official Tomozuna Oyakata that he would need to win at least 13 bouts and be in contention for the yūshō to earn ōzeki promotion. Baruto was nursing an injury to his left thumb throughout the basho, which he picked up in a training session with Aran. However, he produced his best score in the top division to date of 14–1, and lost only to Hakuhō on Day 11. He was in contention for the championship until the final bout of the tournament, which Hakuhō won over Harumafuji to complete an undefeated 15–0 performance. Baruto was rewarded with special prizes for Fighting Spirit and Technique, the first time since Kotomitsuki in July 2007 that one wrestler has received two prizes in the same tournament.

Baruto's promotion was officially confirmed by the Sumo Association on March 31. Speaking to reporters at his Onoe stable, he said, "I want to be cheerful and be an ōzeki that can live up to the expectations of the fans." He also made clear his determination to win the yūshō, as "unless I win a championship I can't move up to yokozuna." However, for a significant period he was not able to challenge for the championship as an ōzeki, his best score never being higher than 11–4. This changed in January 2012, when after he recorded 13 straight wins and his nearest challenger yokozuna Hakuhō suffered three losses in four bouts, he took the championship with two days left to spare. This made him the ninth foreigner, and the second from Europe after Kotoōshū, to win a top division championship. He finished on 14–1, denied a perfect record by Hakuhō on the final day. He was told he had to win the next tournament or be in contention until the final day to earn a shot at yokozuna promotion, but Baruto told reporters the day after celebrating his victory, "If I can wrestle at the spring basho like I did at the New Year meet, results will follow. Once you win one tournament, you want to win a second, a third, a 10th and a 30th." At the Osaka tournament in March he stood at 9–1 after ten days, but lost four of his last five matches to finish on a disappointing 10–5, putting any hopes for yokozuna promotion back to square one. Baruto had been suffering from a fever during the tournament and said afterwards that talk of yokozuna was just "journalistic chatter ... that wasn't my goal in this tournament."

=== Loss of rank ===
Baruto was kadoban, or in danger of demotion from ōzeki, after he pulled out of the Aki basho in September 2012 on the 4th day after injuring the big toe on his right foot before the tournament. Needing at least eight wins to preserve his rank in the Kyushu tournament in November, he instead had to withdraw once again on Day 3 after injuring a thigh muscle, and was demoted back to sekiwake. Needing ten wins in the January 2013 tournament, he lost his chance of an immediate return to ōzeki on Day 13 when he fell to his sixth defeat. He would have had to win 32 or 33 bouts in three consecutive tournaments in makuuchi to earn promotion to ōzeki again. Because he sat out the summer tournament 2013 due to injury, he was demoted to the jūryō division in September 2013 and chose to retire on September 11.

== Fighting style ==
Baruto had a solid and straightforward yotsu-sumo style, concentrating on techniques which involved grabbing the opponent's mawashi or belt. He preferred a migi-yotsu grip, with his right hand inside and left hand outside his opponent's arms. His most common winning kimarite or technique was overwhelmingly yori-kiri, or force out. Due to his great strength he was known for using tsuri-dashi, or lift out, a technique which has declined in recent years because of the increasing weight of wrestlers. Baruto used this technique three times in the July 2009 tournament alone. His great height meant he could reach over his shorter opponents' back to do this, but this unorthodox way of lifting placed a strain on his joints and eventually led to knee problems. He also frequently used uwatenage, or overarm throw. He was forced to change his yotsu style in his successful ōzeki promotion basho of March 2010, as his thumb injury meant he was less effective on the mawashi, and he used a more aggressive slapping and thrusting attack instead.

At 188 kilograms (414 pounds; 29.6 stone), Baruto was the second-heaviest man in the top division at the time, after Gagamaru. He was popular among other wrestlers due to his friendly character and was known for always smiling, win or lose. His stablemaster Onoe Oyakata commented, "All wrestlers have their unique personalities. Baruto is friendly and gentle and he shouldn't change that. He has to win to get promoted but outside the ring I don't want him to forget to smile." Baruto was also known for taking great care not to injure his opponents.

== Matches against Yokozuna ==
During his professional career, Baruto faced three wrestlers who held the rank of Yokozuna during the period of his active career: Asashōryū, Hakuhō and Harumafuji.

| Yokozuna | Head-to-head record | Victories while opponent was Yokozuna | Victory dates |
|---|---|---|---|
| Asashōryū | 0–8 | 0 | — |
| Hakuhō | 3–25 | 3 | 16 January 2010 24 July 2011 27 November 2011 |
| Harumafuji | 10–12* | 0 | — |

* Head-to-head discrepancy: Basho Picks lists Baruto's record against Harumafuji as 10–12, whereas other databases report 12–16. These figures require further verification against individual bout records.

Baruto's three victories over Hakuhō were particularly notable, as Hakuhō was one of the most successful Yokozuna in sumo history.

== After sumo ==
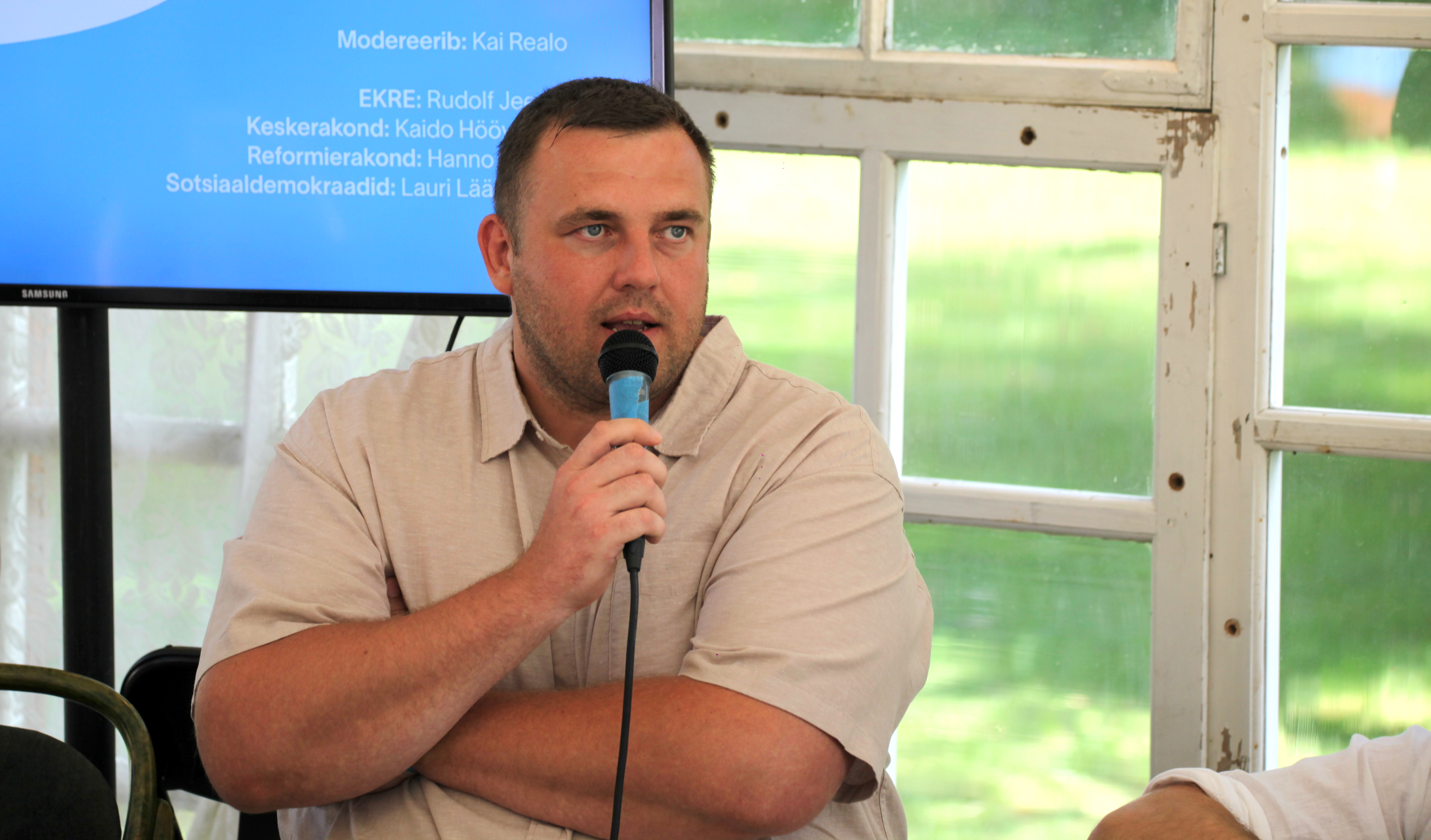
Höövelson at the Arvamusfestival in Paide in 2022

After retirement Baruto became involved in several different business ventures, involving holiday accommodation, cattle breeding, vehicle repair and maintenance, beverage sale, and tourism.

In October 2015 he announced that he would become a mixed martial arts fighter, joining the Rizin Fighting Federation. He told a press conference that he had lost 25 kg (55 lb; 3.9 st) in weight and that he wanted to be "the strongest fighter in the world." On December 31, 2015, he had his first match, defeating Peter Aerts at the Saitama Super Arena. On September 25, 2016, he won by unanimous decision against 45-year-old veteran Kazuyuki Fujita, who announced his retirement afterwards. After four fights, Baruto had three wins against one loss, the single loss being against Mirko Filipović, and said that he "wanted to fix sumo's reputation in the MMA world" after the lack of success of some other ex-sumo professionals who switched to MMA. He is also involved in several charities, including ADHD awareness.

In December 2017, NHK, the Japan Broadcasting Corporation, announced that it would air a three-episode series based on author Gengoroh Tagame's manga series My Brother's Husband. The series tells the story of a man named Yaichi, who is struggling to deal with the death of his gay twin brother, Ryoji. Yaichi and his young daughter Kana's lives become disrupted when they meet Ryoji's Canadian husband, Mike Flanagan. Actor Ryuta Sato was cast to play Yaichi and Baruto Kaito was cast for the role of Mike Flanagan. The series premiered in March 2018 on NHK's BS Premium.

Baruto has also taken part in amateur sumo competitions, winning the open weight category at the Estonian national championships in 2018, and he was planning to compete in the European Sumo Championships in Tallinn in April 2019.

== Political career ==
On September 7, 2018, Höövelson announced that he had joined the Estonian Centre Party and had applied for the 2019 Estonian parliamentary election. He ran for election in Harju and Rapla counties, and received 642 votes. Höövelson was elected to the Riigikogu after candidate Vladimir Arhipov declined his seat. One of his goals as an MP was to promote economic relations between Estonia and Japan. Running for a different constituency in the 2023 elections, he was defeated.

== Personal life ==
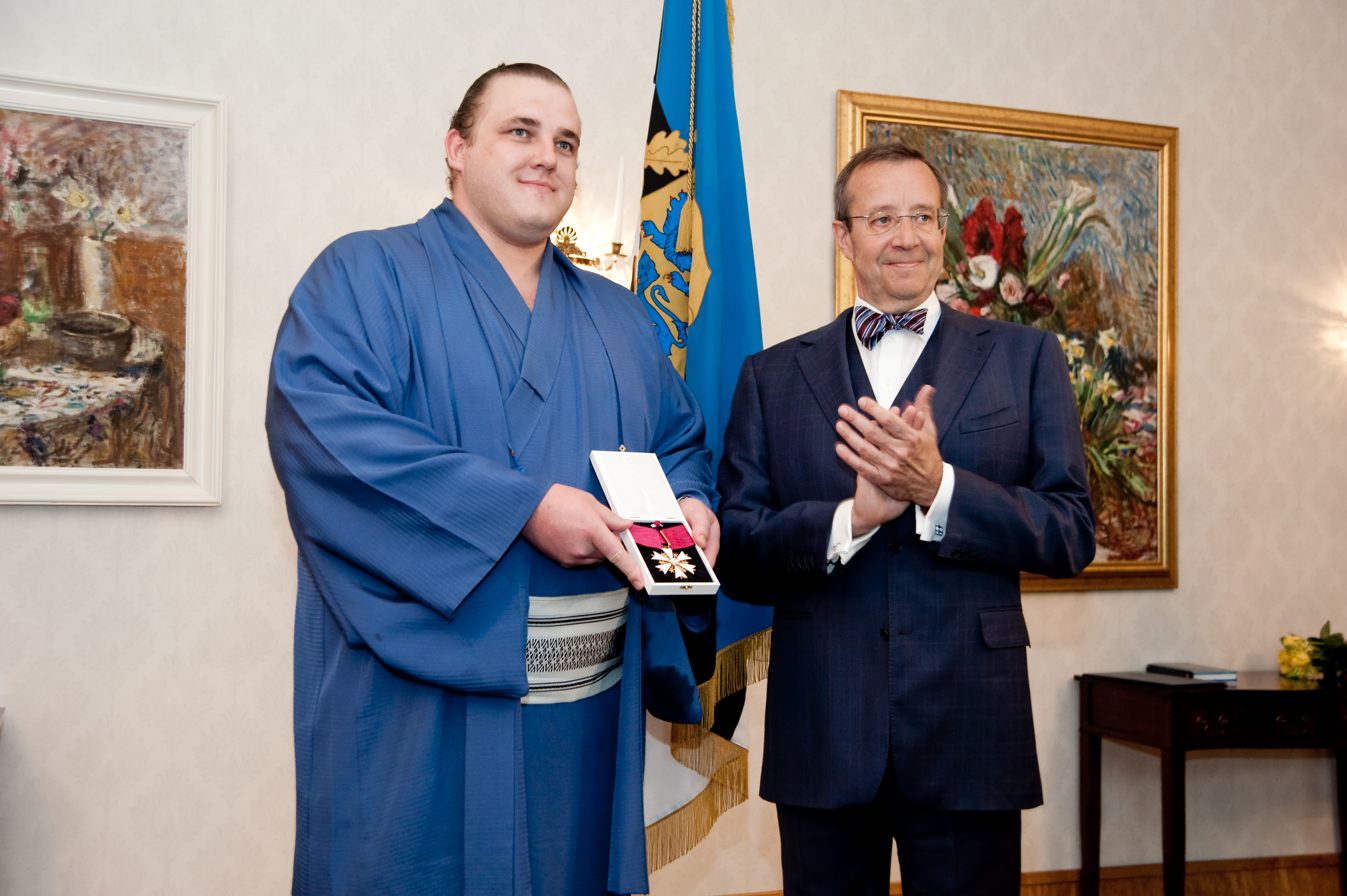
In 2012 Estonian president Toomas Hendrik Ilves awarded the Order of the White Star to Baruto.

While in Japan Baruto's interests away from the dohyō included coin collecting and pachinko.

In February 2009, Höövelson married Elena Tregubova, a 26-year-old Russian from Vladivostok. They had met four years earlier. The couple was married in Japan. In January 2017, a son was born in their family.

Höövelson is fluent in Estonian, Russian, English, German and Japanese.

Höövelson received the Order of the White Star, 3rd Class in 2012.

== Career record ==
Baruto Kaito
| Year | January Hatsu basho, Tokyo | March Haru basho, Osaka | May Natsu basho, Tokyo | July Nagoya basho, Nagoya | September Aki basho, Tokyo | November Kyūshū basho, Fukuoka |
|---|---|---|---|---|---|---|
| 2004 | x | x | (Maezumō) | East Jonokuchi #40; 7–0; Champion | East Jonidan #30; 7–0–P; Champion | West Sandanme #33; 5–2 |
| 2005 | East Sandanme #6; 6–1 | West Makushita #32; 5–2 | East Makushita #22; 6–1 | West Makushita #6; 5–2 | West Jūryō #14; 12–3 | West Jūryō #4; Sat out due to injury 0–1–14 |
| 2006 | West Makushita #3; 6–1–PPP; Champion | East Jūryō #11; 15–0; Champion | West Maegashira #11; 11–4; F | West Maegashira #4; 9–6 | East Maegashira #1; 4–7–4 | West Maegashira #6; 10–5 |
| 2007 | West Maegashira #3; 2–2–11 | West Maegashira #13; Sat out due to injury 0–0–15 | West Jūryō #11; 14–1; Champion | East Maegashira #14; 0–2–13 | West Jūryō #9; 13–2; Champion | East Maegashira #16; 11–4; F |
| 2008 | West Maegashira #6; 7–8 | East Maegashira #7; 12–3; F | West Maegashira #1; 5–10 | West Maegashira #5; 10–5 | East Komusubi #1; 8–7 | West Sekiwake #1; 9–6 |
| 2009 | East Sekiwake #1; 9–6 | East Sekiwake #1; 8–7 | East Sekiwake #1; 4–11 | West Maegashira #3; 11–4 | East Komusubi #1; 12–3; F | East Sekiwake #1; 9–6 |
| 2010 | East Sekiwake #1; 12–3; O | East Sekiwake #1; 14–1; FT | West Ōzeki #3; 10–5 | East Ōzeki #1; 8–7 | East Ōzeki #2; 9–6 | West Ōzeki #1; 11–4 |
| 2011 | West Ōzeki #1; 9–6 | East Ōzeki #2; Tournament Cancelled; Match fixing investigation 0–0–0 | East Ōzeki #2; 10–5 | East Ōzeki #1; 11–4 | West Ōzeki #1; 10–5 | East Ōzeki #1; 11–4 |
| 2012 | East Ōzeki #1; 14–1 | East Ōzeki #1; 10–5 | West Ōzeki #1; 9–6 | East Ōzeki #2; 9–6 | West Ōzeki #2; 1–3–11 | East Ōzeki #3; 1–2–12 |
| 2013 | West Sekiwake #1; 8–7 | West Sekiwake #1; 9–6 | West Sekiwake #1; 3–5–7 | East Maegashira #6; Sat out due to injury 0–0–15 | East Jūryō #3; Retired – | x |
Record given as wins–losses–absences Top division champion Top division runner-up Retired Non-participation Jūryō Lower divisions Sanshō key: F=Fighting spirit; O=Outstanding performance; T=Technique Also shown: ★=Kinboshi; P=Playoff(s); Divisions: Makuuchi — Jūryō — Makushita — Sandanme — Jonidan — Jonokuchi Makuuchi ranks: Yokozuna — Ōzeki — Sekiwake — Komusubi — Maegashira

== Mixed martial arts record ==
Professional record breakdown
| 4 matches | 3 wins | 1 loss |
| By knockout | 0 | 1 |
| By decision | 3 | 0 |

| Res. | Record | Opponent | Method | Event | Date | Round | Time | Location | Notes |
|---|---|---|---|---|---|---|---|---|---|
| Loss | 3–1 | Mirko Cro Cop | TKO (knee to the body) | Rizin World Grand-Prix 2016: Final Round | December 31, 2016 | 1 | 0:49 | Saitama, Japan | 2016 Rizin Openweight Grand Prix Semifinal. |
| Win | 3–0 | Tsuyoshi Kohsaka | Decision (unanimous) | Rizin World Grand-Prix 2016: 2nd Round | December 29, 2016 | 2 | 5:00 | Saitama, Japan | 2016 Rizin Openweight Grand Prix Quarterfinal. |
| Win | 2–0 | Kazuyuki Fujita | Decision (unanimous) | Rizin World Grand-Prix 2016: 1st Round | September 25, 2016 | 2 | 5:00 | Saitama, Japan | 2016 Rizin Openweight Grand Prix First Round. |
| Win | 1–0 | Peter Aerts | Decision (unanimous) | Rizin World Grand-Prix 2015: Part 2 – Iza | December 31, 2015 | 3 | 3:00 | Saitama, Japan | |

== See also ==
- List of sumo tournament top-division champions
- List of sumo tournament top division runners-up
- List of sumo tournament second-division champions
- Glossary of sumo terms
- List of non-Japanese sumo wrestlers
- List of past sumo wrestlers
- List of ōzeki
