= 2015 in Rizin Fighting Federation =

Information
- First date: December 29
- Last date: December 31

Events
- Total events: 2

Fights

Chronology
N/A	2015 in Rizin Fighting Federation	2016 in Rizin Fighting Federation

The year 2015 was the first year in the history of the Rizin Fighting Federation, a mixed martial arts promotion based in Japan. Only two events were held this year, both consisting of the Rizin World Grand-Prix 2015. Rizin events are broadcast through a television agreement with Fuji Television.

== Background ==
On September 19, 2015 during Bellator 142 Dynamite 1 event, it was announced that Pride FC co-founder Nobuyuki Sakakibara had signed former Pride Heavyweight Champion The Last Emperor Fedor Emelianenko to headline his new promotion's New Year's Eve Show in Tokyo.

On October 8, 2015 The former President of Pride FC, Sakakibara held a press conference to announce his return to MMA with Rizin Fighting Federation.

Sakakibara returned to mainstream MMA, along with Nobuhiko Takada and other former Pride FC employees.

Rizin partnered with Bellator MMA to allow former Strikeforce Light Heavyweight Champion, Muhammed "King Mo" Lawal to compete the Rizin's inaugural grand prix. Eventually, King Mo won the 8 man under 100 kg tournament with a prize of $300,000.

== List of events ==
#	Event	Date	Venue	Location	Attendance
1	Rizin World Grand Prix 2015: Part 1 - Saraba	December 29, 2015	Saitama Super Arena	Saitama, Japan	12,214
2	Rizin World Grand Prix 2015: Part 2 - Iza	December 31, 2015	Saitama Super Arena	Saitama, Japan	18,365

== 100 kg World Grand-Prix bracket ==
Quarterfinals
(United States) Muhammed Lawal	KO
(England) Brett McDermott	1r.
(Lithuania) Teodoras Aukštuolis	KO
(Brazil) Bruno Cappelozza	1r.
(Japan) Satoshi Ishii	1r.
(Czech Republic) Jiří Procházka	KO
(Croatia) Goran Reljić	1r.
(Russia) Vadim Nemkov	KO

Semifinals
(United States) Muhammed Lawal	DEC
(Lithuania) Teodoras Aukštuolis	3r.
(Czech Republic) Jiří Procházka	TKO
(Russia) Vadim Nemkov	1r.

Final
(United States) Muhammed Lawal	KO
(Czech Republic) Jiří Procházka	1r.

== Rizin World Grand Prix 2015: Part 1 - Saraba ==
Rizin World Grand Prix 2015: Part 1 - Saraba
- Promotion: Rizin Fighting Federation
- Date: December 29, 2015
- Venue: Saitama Super Arena
- City: Saitama, Japan

Event chronology
Rizin World Grand Prix 2015: Part 1 - Saraba	Rizin World Grand Prix 2015: Part 2 - Iza

Rizin World Grand Prix 2015: Part 1 - Saraba was an inaugural mixed martial arts event held by the Rizin Fighting Federation on December 29, 2015 at the Saitama Super Arena in Saitama, Japan.

=== Results ===
Fight Card
Weight Class				Method	Round	Time	Notes
Welterweight 77 kg	(Japan) Shinya Aoki	def.	(Japan) Kazushi Sakuraba	TKO (Corner Stoppage)	1	5:56	
Grand-Prix 100 kg	(Czech Republic) Jiří Procházka	def.	(Japan) Satoshi Ishii	KO (Knees)	1	1:36	RIZIN World Grand Prix 2015 Quarter-Finals
Grand-Prix 100 kg	(Russia) Vadim Nemkov	def.	(Croatia) Goran Reljić	KO (Punches)	1	2:58	RIZIN World Grand Prix 2015 Quarter-Finals
Grand-Prix 100 kg	(Lithuania) Teodoras Aukštuolis	def.	(Brazil) Bruno Cappelozza	KO (Punches)	1	4:32	RIZIN World Grand Prix 2015 Quarter-Finals
Grand-Prix 100 kg	(United States) Muhammed Lawal	def.	(England) Brett McDermott	KO (Punches)	1	9:10	RIZIN World Grand Prix 2015 Quarter-Finals
Grand-Prix 100 kg	(Russia) Valentin Moldavsky	def.	(Japan) Yuta Uchida	Submission (Rear Naked Choke)	1	2:20	RIZIN World Grand Prix 2015 Reserve Fight
Featherweight 66 kg	(Japan) Hiroyuki Takaya	def.	(Japan) Daiki Hata	Decision (Unanimous)	3	20:00	
Bantamweight 61 kg	(Japan) Hideo Tokoro	def.	(Japan) Kizaemon Saiga	Submission (Armbar)	1	5:16	
Middleweight 84 kg	(Russia) Anatoly Tokov	def.	(United States) A.J. Matthews	TKO (Punches)	1	0:55	
K-1 Lightweight 70 kg	(Japan) Hinata	def.	(Japan) Kazuyuki Miyata	TKO (3 knockdowns)	1	2:14	
K-1 Featherweight 66 kg	(Japan) Hiroya	def.	(Japan) Akiyo Nishiura	KO (Punches)	3	7:20	
Flyweight 57 kg	(Brazil) Felipe Efrain	def.	(Japan) Yuki Motoya	No Contest	1	5:45	Originally a 1st-round TKO win by Efrain. Ends in a No Contest, Efrain Missed Weight.
Heavyweight 120 kg	(Russia) Kirill Sidelnikov	def.	(Brazil) Carlos Toyota	TKO (Punches)	1	2:23	
Heavyweight 120 kg	(Japan) Tsuyoshi Kosaka	def.	(England) James Thompson	TKO (Punches)	2	11:58	

== Rizin World Grand Prix 2015: Part 2 - Iza ==
Rizin World Grand Prix 2015: Part 2 - Iza
- Promotion: Rizin Fighting Federation
- Date: December 31, 2015
- Venue: Saitama Super Arena
- City: Saitama, Japan

Event chronology
Rizin World Grand-Prix 2015: Part 1 - Saraba	Rizin World Grand Prix 2015: Part 2 - Iza	Rizin Fighting Federation 1

Rizin World Grand Prix 2015: Part 2 - Iza was a mixed martial arts event held by the Rizin Fighting Federation on December 31, 2015 at the Saitama Super Arena in Saitama, Japan.

=== Results ===
Fight Card
Weight Class				Method	Round	Time	Notes
Grand-Prix 100 kg	(United States) Muhammed Lawal	def.	(Czech Republic) Jiří Procházka	KO (Punches)	1	5:09	RIZIN World Grand Prix 2015 Final
Heavyweight 120 kg	(Russia) Fedor Emelianenko	def.	(India) Singh Jaideep	TKO（Punches）	1	3:02	
Featherweight 66 kg	(Brazil) Kron Gracie	def.	(Japan) Erson Yamamoto	Submission (Triangle Choke)	1	4:58	
Catchweight 72.5 kg	(Netherlands) Andy Souwer	def.	(Japan) Yuichiro Nagashima	KO (Punches)	1	5:28	
Openweight	(Estonia) Baruto Kaito	def.	(Netherlands) Peter Aerts	Decision (Unanimous)	3	9:00	
Shootboxing 100+ kg	(United States) Bob Sapp	def.	(Japan) Akebono Tarō	Decision (Unanimous)	3	15:00	
Female Light Heavyweight 93 kg	(Brazil) Gabrielle Garcia	def.	(Tonga) Lei'D Tapa	TKO (Referee Stoppage)	1	2:36	
K-1 Flyweight 57 kg	(Japan) Takeru	def.	(China) Yang Ming	TKO (Referee Stoppage)	2	6:00	
Bantamweight 61 kg	(South Korea) Soo Chul Kim	def.	(Brazil) Maike Linhares	Decision (Unanimous)	3	20:00	
Catchweight 81 kg	(United States) Brennan Ward	def.	(Japan) Ken Hasegawa	Submission (Rear Naked Choke)	2	11:52	
Grand-Prix 100 kg	(Czech Republic) Jiří Procházka	def.	(Russia) Vadim Nemkov	TKO (Retirement)	1	10:00	RIZIN World Grand Prix 2015 Semi-Finals
Grand-Prix 100 kg	(United States) Muhammed Lawal	def.	(Lithuania) Teodoras Aukštuolis	Decision (Unanimous)	2	15:00	RIZIN World Grand Prix 2015 Semi-Finals
Female Strawweight 52 kg	(Japan) Rena Kubota	def.	(Italy) Jleana Valentino	Submission (Armbar)	2	8:31	
