= Kanako Murata =

Japanese wrestler and mixed martial artist

- Born: August 10, 1993 (age 33); Matsuyama, Ehime Prefecture, Japan
- Native name: 村田夏南子
- Height: 156 cm (5 ft 1 in)
- Weight: 115 lb (52 kg; 8 st 3 lb)
- Division: Strawweight; Flyweight
- Style: Wrestling, Judo
- Stance: Southpaw
- Fighting out of: Dublin, California, United States
- Team: Combat Sports Academy (2019–present)
- Trainer: Kazunori Yokota
- Rank: Purple belt in Brazilian jiu-jitsu
- Years active: 2016–present (MMA)

Mixed martial arts record
- Total: 17
- Wins: 14
- By knockout: 2
- By submission: 5
- By decision: 7
- Losses: 3
- By knockout: 1
- By submission: 1
- By decision: 1

Other information
- Mixed martial arts record from Sherdog

Kanako Murata (村田 夏南子, born August 10, 1993) is a Japanese mixed martial artist and former wrestler, who competes in the Strawweight division. A professional mixed martial artist since 2016, Murata has competed in the Ultimate Fighting Championship, Rizin Fighting Federation and Invicta FC where she is a former Invicta FC Strawweight Champion.

== Background ==
Murata was born and raised in Matsuyama, Japan. The granddaughter of a judo dojo master, Murata started training judo at the age of three. She was a national champion in judo in her high school years. After judo, she transitioned to freestyle wrestling in which she won Junior World Championship in 2011.

== Mixed martial arts career ==
=== Rizin Fighting Federation ===
Murata was scheduled to make her professional debut against Natalya Denisova at Rizin 1 on April 17, 2016. She won the fight by unanimous decision.

Murata made her flyweight debut against Maia Kahaunaele-Stevenson at KOTC: Firefight on June 4, 2016. She won the fight by a third-round technical knockout.

Murata remained at flyweight for her next fight with Ilona Wijmans at Shoot Box Girls S-Cup 2016 on July 7, 2016. She won the fight by a first-round technical knockout.

Murata was scheduled to face Kyra Batara in a strawweight bout at Rizin World Grand Prix 2016: 1st Round on September 26, 2016. She won the fight by unanimous decision.

Murata was scheduled to face Rin Nakai in a flyweight bout at Rizin World Grand Prix 2016: 2nd Round on December 29, 2016. Murata suffered her first professional loss, tapping to a rear-naked choke in the third round.

Murata was scheduled to face Claire Fryer in a strawweight bout at Pancrase 288 on July 2, 2017. She won the fight by unanimous decision.

Murata was scheduled to face Yukari Nabe in a flyweight bout at DEEP 79 Impact on September 16, 2017. She won the fight by unanimous decision.

Murata remained at flyweight for her next fight, against Lanchana Green at Rizin 10 on May 6, 2018. She won the fight by a first-round anaconda choke submission.

Murata was scheduled to face Angela Magana at Rizin 12 on August 12, 2018. She won the fight by a first-round submission.

Murata made her last appearance with Rizin against Saray Orozco at Rizin 15 on April 21, 2019. Murata was originally scheduled to face Shinju Nozawa-Auclair, before Nozawa-Auclair withdrew due to a ligament injury. She won the fight by her second career, and second consecutive, Von Flue choke submission.

=== Invicta ===
It was announced on August 30, 2018, that Murata had signed with Invicta FC, and would compete in their strawweight division.

Murata was scheduled to make her promotional debut with Invicta, almost a year after signing with them, against Liana Pirosin at Invicta FC 35: Bennett vs. Rodriguez II on June 7, 2019. She won the fight by a first-round rear-naked choke submission. This fight earned her a "Performance of the Night" award.

Murata was scheduled to fight Emily Ducote for the vacant Invicta FC Strawweight Championship at Invicta FC 38: Murata vs. Ducote on November 1, 2019. She won the fight by split decision.

=== Ultimate Fighting Championship ===
Murata announced on July 5, 2020, that she had signed with the UFC.

Murata was expected to face Lívia Renata Souza on November 14, 2020 at UFC Fight Night: Felder vs. dos Anjos. However, Souza pulled out in early November due to an undisclosed injury and was replaced by Randa Markos. She won the fight via unanimous decision.

Murata faced Virna Jandiroba on June 19, 2021 at UFC on ESPN 25. She lost the fight via doctor stoppage after round 2 due to a elbow dislocation caused by an armbar applied by Jandiroba.

After a two-year layoff, Murata faced Vanessa Demopoulos on October 7, 2023, at UFC Fight Night 229. She lost the fight via unanimous decision. 13 out of 14 media outlets scored the bout as a win for Murata.

On November 7, 2023 it was announced that Murata was no longer with the UFC.

== Championships and accomplishments ==
- Invicta Fighting Championships
  - Invicta FC Strawweight Championship (One time, former)
  - Performance of the Night (One time) vs. Liana Pirosin

== Mixed martial arts record ==
Professional record breakdown
17 matches	14 wins	3 losses
By knockout	2	1
By submission	5	1
By decision	7	1

Res.	Record	Opponent	Method	Event	Date	Round	Time	Location	Notes
Win	14–3	Sofiia Bagishvili	Technical Submission (arm-triangle choke)	JCK Kings 016	September 5, 2026	1	2:31	Lüliang, China	
Win	13–3	Ediana Silva	Decision (unanimous)	UAE Warriors 61	July 23, 2025	3	5:00	Abu Dhabi, United Arab Emirates	
Loss	12–3	Vanessa Demopoulos	Decision (unanimous)	UFC Fight Night: Dawson vs. Green	October 7, 2023	3	5:00	Las Vegas, Nevada, United States	
Loss	12–2	Virna Jandiroba	TKO (arm injury)	UFC on ESPN: The Korean Zombie vs. Ige	June 19, 2021	2	5:00	Las Vegas, Nevada, United States	
Win	12–1	Randa Markos	Decision (unanimous)	UFC Fight Night: Felder vs. dos Anjos	November 14, 2020	3	5:00	Las Vegas, Nevada, United States	
Win	11–1	Emily Ducote	Decision (split)	Invicta FC 38	November 1, 2019	5	5:00	Kansas City, Kansas, United States	Won the vacant Invicta FC Strawweight Championship.
Win	10–1	Liana Pirosin	Submission (rear-naked choke)	Invicta FC 35	June 7, 2019	1	2:10	Kansas City, Kansas, United States	Return to Strawweight. Performance of the Night.
Win	9–1	Saray Orozco	Submission (Von Flue choke)	Rizin 15	April 21, 2019	2	2:12	Yokohama, Japan	
Win	8–1	Angela Magana	Submission (Von Flue choke)	Rizin 12	August 12, 2018	2	3:53	Nagoya, Japan	Strawweight bout.
Win	7–1	Lanchana Green	Submission (anaconda choke)	Rizin 10	May 6, 2018	1	4:52	Fukuoka, Japan	
Win	6–1	Yukari Nabe	Decision (unanimous)	DEEP 79 Impact	September 16, 2017	3	5:00	Tokyo, Japan	
Win	5–1	Claire Fryer	Decision (unanimous)	Pancrase 288	July 2, 2017	3	5:00	Tokyo, Japan	Strawweight bout.
Loss	4–1	Rin Nakai	Submission (rear-naked choke)	Rizin World Grand Prix 2016: 2nd Round	December 29, 2016	3	1:16	Saitama, Japan	
Win	4–0	Kyra Batara	Decision (unanimous)	Rizin World Grand Prix 2016: 1st Round	September 26, 2016	3	5:00	Saitama, Japan	Strawweight bout.
Win	3–0	Ilona Wijmans	TKO (punches)	Shoot Box Girls S-Cup 2016	July 7, 2016	1	1:17	Tokyo, Japan	
Win	2–0	Maia Kahaunaele-Stevenson	TKO (punches)	KOTC: Firefight	June 4, 2016	3	3:43	San Jacinto, California, United States	Flyweight debut.
Win	1–0	Natalya Denisova	Decision (unanimous)	Rizin 1	April 17, 2016	3	5:00	Nagoya, Japan	Strawweight debut.

== See also ==
- List of female mixed martial artists

Awards and achievements
Preceded by Brianna Van Buren	7th Invicta FC Strawweight Champion; November 1, 2019 – September 2, 2020	Succeeded by Emily Ducote
