= Jiří Procházka =

Czech mixed martial artist (born 1992)

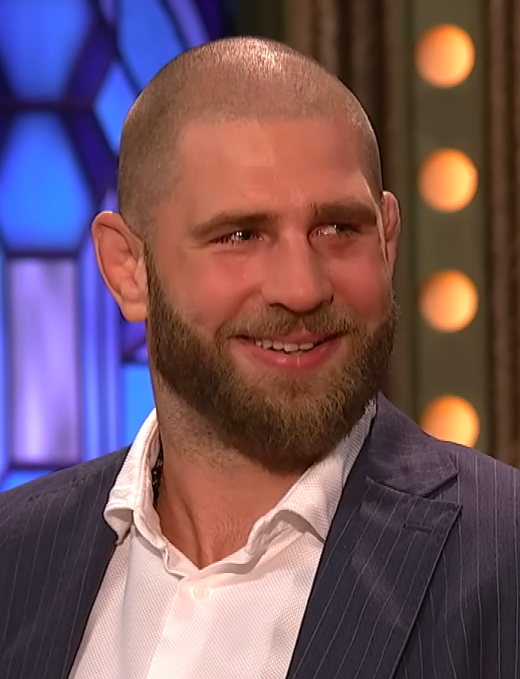
- Procházka in 2022
- Born: October 14, 1992 (age 34); Znojmo, Czechoslovakia
- Other names: BJP
- Nationality: Czech
- Height: 6 ft 4 in (193 cm)
- Weight: 205 lb (93 kg; 14 st 9 lb)
- Division: Light Heavyweight (2012–2015, 2017–present); Heavyweight (2015–2016)
- Reach: 80 in (203 cm)
- Fighting out of: Brno, Czech Republic
- Team: Jetsaam Gym Brno; Bangtao Muay Thai & MMA; Xtreme Couture
- Trainer: Martin Karaivanov (head coach & kickboxing coach); Jaroslav Hovězák (MMA coach); Zdeněk Dohnal (strength coach)
- Rank: Black belt in Kyokushin
- Years active: 2012–present (MMA)

Mixed martial arts record
- Total: 40
- Wins: 32
- By knockout: 28
- By submission: 3
- By decision: 1
- Losses: 7
- By knockout: 6
- By submission: 1
- Draws: 1

Other information
- University: Masaryk University
- Website: www.jiribjp.com
- Mixed martial arts record from Sherdog
Medal record
Men's Muay Thai
(Czech Republic) Czech National Championships
| Gold medal – first place | 2011 Prague | −86 kg |

YouTube information
- Channel: Jiri BJP Prochazka
- Subscribers: 75 thousand
- Views: 6 million
- Last updated: January 17, 2026

Jiří Procházka (Czech: [ˈjɪr̝iː ˈproxaːska]; [ˈjɪrka]; born October 14, 1992) is a Czech professional mixed martial artist. He currently competes in the Light Heavyweight division of the Ultimate Fighting Championship (UFC), where he is a former UFC Light Heavyweight Champion and the first Czech fighter to win a UFC championship. He was the inaugural Rizin Fighting Federation Light Heavyweight Champion and the inaugural Gladiator Fighting Championship Light Heavyweight Champion. As of April 14, 2026, he is #3 in the Meta UFC light heavyweight rankings.

== Early life ==
Procházka was born on October 14, 1992, in a hospital in Znojmo in Czechoslovakia (now the Czech Republic), but he comes from the nearby village of Hostěradice. Procházka's father died at age 27 when Jiří was six years old. In his youth, Procházka played amateur football for TJ Družstevník Hostěradice. He was also an active freestyle BMX rider and a floorball player.

As a teen, Procházka partook in street fights almost weekly, getting into more than 100 of them. This eventually led him to join the hooligan firm tied to Procházka's local football team, FC Zbrojovka Brno, where he would take part in organized group street fights with clubs of other teams, even participating in 30-on-30 brawls.

Procházka first encountered mixed martial arts before beginning high school, after a friend showed him videos of kickboxer Ramon Dekkers and mixed martial artists Mirko Filipovic and Fedor Emelianenko. After watching the film Never Back Down, he began to train in martial arts, in particular Thai boxing.

== Mixed martial arts career ==
=== Gladiator Fighting Championship ===
==== Debut and initial fights ====
Procházka made his professional MMA debut in April 2012 for the Gladiator Fighting Championship, the biggest promotion in his native Czech Republic at the time. He amassed a 7–2 record within his first two years of fighting professionally.

==== Inaugural Light Heavyweight Champion ====
In his tenth professional bout, he won the inaugural GCF Light Heavyweight Championship in the back-and-forth fight against Czech MMA pioneer Martin Šolc via flying knee knockout on December 7, 2013, at GCF 26 FN. Video of the bout went viral in the Czech Republic and Procházka was also awarded a post-fight bonus. The fight was later awarded 'Czech Fight of the Year' by major media outlets.

Procházka defended his title against Tomáš Penz on June 6, 2014, at GCF 28: Cage Fight 4. He won the fight via technical knockout due to a flying knee in 41 seconds.

Procházka signed a deal with the Rizin Fighting Federation shortly before his win against Evgeni Kondratov. After amassing a record of 14–2–1 during his first three years in the sport, Procházka as the first Czech entered the Rizin Fighting Federation in 2015.

=== Rizin Fighting Federation ===
==== Heavyweight Grand Prix ====
Procházka made his promotional debut against Satoshi Ishii on December 29, 2015, in the World Grand Prix 2015 –100 kg tournament at the Rizin FF's first event Saraba no Utake. He won the quarter-final fight via knockout in the first round.

Procházka's next fight in the Rizin FF's -100 kg tournament was at Iza no Mai on December 31, 2015. He won the semi-final fight against Vadim Nemkov via technical knockout. Later that same night, he lost in the final round against Muhammed Lawal via knockout in the first round. Procházka weighed in at 95.9 kgs (211.5 pounds) for the tournament.

Procházka faced Kazuyuki Fujita on April 17, 2016, at Rizin 1 at a catchweight of 110 kgs (242.5 pounds). Procházka weighed in at 98.6 kgs (217.3 pounds) for the bout. He won the fight via technical knockout in the first round.

Procházka faced Mark Tanios on September 25, 2016, at Rizin 2 - Rizin Fighting World Grand Prix 2016: Opening Round. He won the fight via unanimous decision. Procházka suffered a knee injury during the fight and was subsequently pulled from the tournament.

==== Return to Light Heavyweight ====
Procházka faced Willian Roberto Alves on September 29, 2017, at Fusion FN 16 - Cage Fight, the homecoming event organized by his team. He won the fight via technical knockout in the first round.

Procházka faced Karl Albrektsson on December 29, 2017, at Rizin Fighting World Grand Prix 2017 - Bantamweight Tournament: 2nd Round. He won the fight via technical knockout in the first round.

Procházka faced Bruno Cappelozza on July 28, 2018, at Rizin 11. He won the fight via knockout in the first round.

Procházka faced Jake Heun on September 30, 2018, at Rizin 13. He won the fight via technical knockout in the first round.

Procházka was scheduled to face Emanuel Newton on December 31, 2018, at Rizin 14. However, Newton was pulled out of the fight, citing a rib injury. Procházka remained on the card and was rescheduled to face Brandon Halsey. He won the fight via technical knockout in the first round.

==== Inaugural Light Heavyweight Champion ====
Procházka faced Muhammed Lawal in rematch on April 21, 2019, at Rizin 15 for the inaugural Rizin FF Light Heavyweight Championship. He won the fight via technical knockout in the third round.

Procházka faced Fábio Maldonado on October 12, 2019, at Rizin 19: Lightweight Grand Prix 1st Round at a catchweight of 100 kgs (220.4 pounds). Procházka weighed in at 97.90 kgs (215.8 pounds) for the bout. He won the fight via knockout in the first round.

Procházka defended his title against C. B. Dollaway on December 31, 2019, at Rizin 20. He won the fight via knockout in the first round. This was the last fight on the Procházka's contract with Rizin. After the fight, he signed a new deal with the UFC and vacated his title.

=== Ultimate Fighting Championship ===
==== Debut and contender fight ====
Procházka signed a contract with the UFC in January 2020. He made his promotional debut against former UFC Light Heavyweight title challenger Volkan Oezdemir on July 11, 2020, at UFC 251. He won via knockout in the second round and was awarded a Performance of the Night bonus award. With this win, he's the only man to give Oezdemir a KO loss in his MMA career.

Procházka was expected to face two–time UFC Light Heavyweight Championship title challenger Dominick Reyes on February 27, 2021, at UFC Fight Night 186. However, in late January, Reyes was pulled from the fight, due to injury, and the bout was rescheduled for May 1, 2021, at UFC on ESPN: Reyes vs. Procházka. In a back and forth fight, Procházka won the fight via knockout in the second round. With this win, he was awarded the Performance of the Night and Fight of the Night bonus awards.

==== UFC Light Heavyweight Champion ====
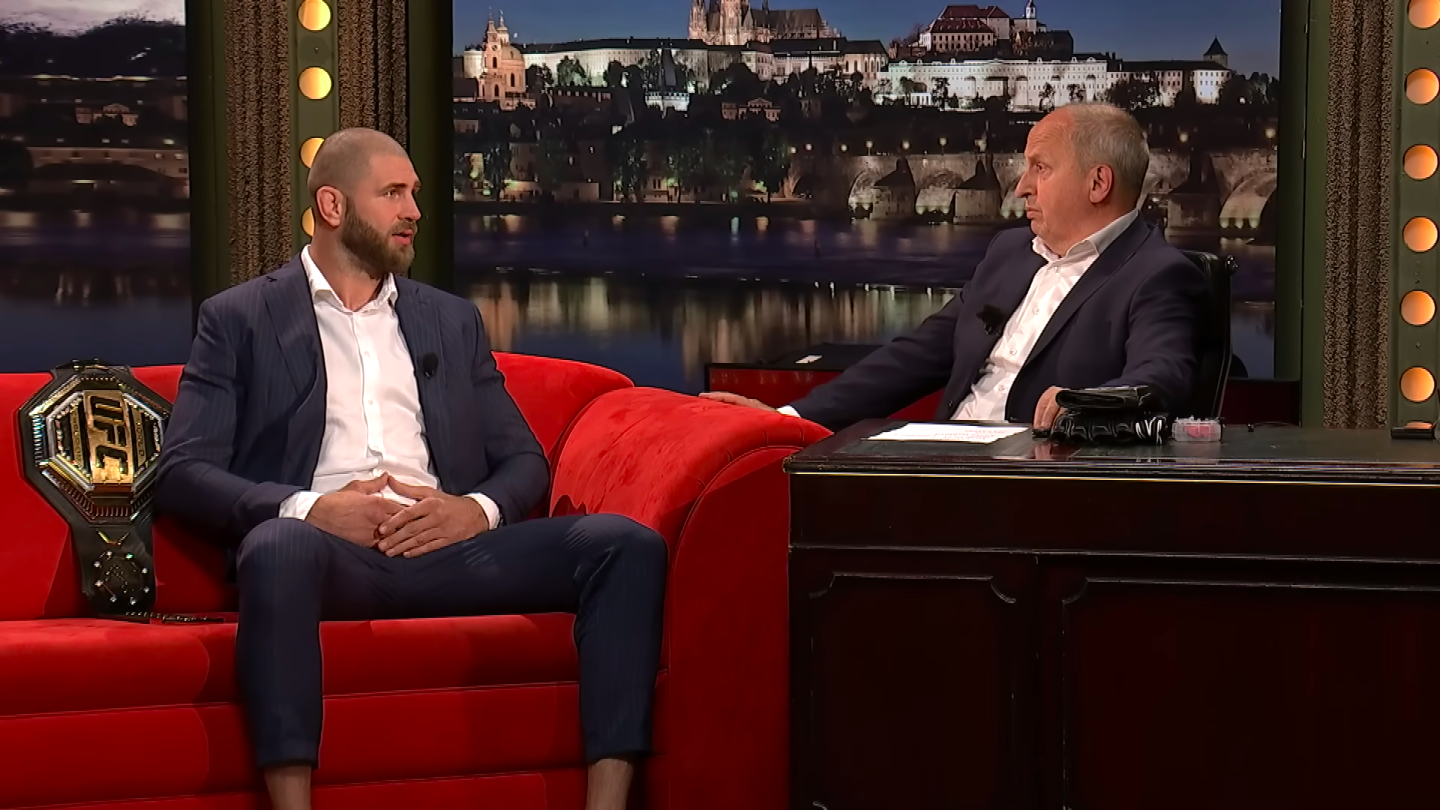
Procházka (left) with his UFC Light Heavyweight belt during a Czech talk show in 2022

Procházka was scheduled to face Glover Teixeira for the UFC Light Heavyweight Championship on May 7, 2022, at UFC 274. However, the bout was postponed to June 11, 2022, at UFC 275 for undisclosed reasons. In a back-and-forth fight which saw both fighters get dropped multiple times, Procházka won the bout and title via rear-naked choke submission in the fifth round, becoming the first Czech fighter to win a UFC championship. This fight earned him the Fight of the Night award and the Crypto.com "Fan Bonus of the Night" award paid in bitcoin of US$20,000 for second place.

Procházka was booked to rematch Teixeira at UFC 282 on December 10, 2022. However, it was announced on November 23, 2022, that Procházka was forced out of the fight due to an injury to his right shoulder, and that he had vacated the title.

Procházka faced former UFC Middleweight champion Alex Pereira for the vacant UFC Light Heavyweight Championship belt on November 11, 2023, at UFC 295. He lost by knockout in the second round.

==== Post championship ====
Procházka faced Aleksandar Rakić on April 13, 2024, at UFC 300. Despite taking numerous leg kicks, Procházka came back and won the bout by technical knockout in the second round. Due to the UFC increasing the payout of post fight bonuses from $50,000 to $300,000 for the event, this fight earned him a $300,000 Performance of the Night award.

On two weeks notice, replacing the bout between Michael Chandler and Conor McGregor, who was injured, Procházka faced Alex Pereira in a rematch for the UFC Light Heavyweight Championship on June 29, 2024, at UFC 303. After being knocked down in the last second of the first round with a left hook, he lost the bout via a head kick knockdown followed by punches early in the second round.

Procházka faced former UFC Light Heavyweight Champion Jamahal Hill on January 18, 2025, at UFC 311. He won the fight by technical knockout in the third round. This fight earned him another Performance of the Night award.

Procházka faced former title challenger Khalil Rountree Jr. on October 4, 2025, at UFC 320. He won the fight by knockout in the third round. This fight earned him both a Performance of the Night and Fight of the Night award totalling $100,000.

Procházka faced Carlos Ulberg for the vacant light heavyweight championship on April 11, 2026, in the main event of UFC 327. He lost the bout by knockout in the first round, with Ulberg securing the finish despite sustaining a leg injury earlier in the fight.

Procházka faced Navajo Stirling in the main event on November 21, 2026 at UFC Fight Night 294. He lost the fight by knockout via a right hook at the end of the second round.

== Fighting style ==
Procházka is widely regarded for his unorthodox and unpredictable fighting style, blending traditional martial arts philosophy with an aggressive, high-risk approach. Fighting out of a wide stance with his hands often down, he relies heavily on head movement, timing, and reflexes rather than textbook defense.

Rather than focus on control or efficiency, Procházka embraces a philosophy of total engagement, frequently taking damage to create openings for counterattacks. He has stated in interviews that he prefers a mindset of "no-mind" in the cage—drawing from Zen and Bushido principles to fight instinctively rather than strategically. Defensively, Procházka has drawn criticism for leaving openings, but his durability, recovery, and offensive unpredictability have allowed him to survive and turn the tide in chaotic exchanges.

== Personal life ==
Procházka is well known as a devoted follower of the Bushido principles, the samurai moral values and Miyamoto Musashi's teachings and philosophy, especially Musashi's The Book of Five Rings, which Procházka considers a life-changing book for him.

He is a supporter of FC Zbrojovka Brno and was involved in organized football hooliganism, including pre-arranged fights, until he started his professional combat sports career.

Besides his native Czech, Procházka is conversational in English and has actively improved his proficiency in the language since joining the promotion. Procházka is also conversational in Japanese, having mostly fought in the country for the latter half of the 2010s.

While competing in UFC and Rizin FF, Procházka attended Masaryk University for his bachelor's degree, majoring in security forces physical fitness policy. He is also a graduate of his local Protective Service Secondary Academy (Czech: SOŠ OOM), now the Brno's School of Law & Security (Czech: BPA). He has also earned a master's degree in Security and Strategic Studies from Masaryk University's School of Special & Sports Education of Security Bodies while competing in the UFC.

Procházka is known for his catchphrase, "BJP" (B'e-y'e-p'e; Czech: [bɛːjɛːpɛː]). It is the Czech initialism for "Bomby jak piča(!)" (English: Bomb The Shit Out of 'Em[!] or Bomb-'em-up[!]), it is Procházka's battle cry and also the name of his merchandise brand.

His nickname, Denisa, is a girl's name in the Czech language equivalent to the English Denise, and Deniska. It originated during a training camp, where Procházka had responded to his trainer's call for another fighter, who was a girl called Denisa.

Since 2017, Procházka has lived in a cottage about 30 minutes outside of his hometown of Brno, near a reservoir. The cottage was previously thought to have electricity but no gas and or water connection. This was later debunked by Procházka himself in a YouTube video, stating that he has the aforementioned utilities.

== Championships and accomplishments ==
=== Mixed martial arts ===
- Ultimate Fighting Championship
  - UFC Light Heavyweight Championship (One time)
    - First Czech champion in UFC history
  - Fight of the Night (Three times) vs. Dominick Reyes, Glover Teixeira and Khalil Rountree Jr.
  - Performance of the Night (Five times) vs. Volkan Oezdemir, Dominick Reyes, Aleksandar Rakić. Jamahal Hill and Khalil Rountree Jr.
  - UFC Honors Awards
    - 2020: Fan's Choice Debut of the Year Nominee vs. Volkan Oezdemir
    - 2021: President's Choice Fight of the Year Nominee vs. Dominick Reyes & Fan's Choice Knockout of the Year Nominee vs. Dominick Reyes
    - 2022: President's Choice Fight of the Year Nominee vs. Glover Teixeira & Fan's Choice Submission of the Year Nominee vs. Glover Teixeira
    - 2025: Fan's Choice Comeback of the Year Winner & President's Choice Fight of the Year Nominee vs. Khalil Rountree Jr.
  - UFC.com Awards
    - 2020: Ranked #5 Newcomer of the Year
    - 2021: Half-Year Awards: Best Fight of the 1HY, Ranked #2 Knockout of the Year vs. Dominick Reyes & Ranked #5 Fight of the Year vs. Dominick Reyes
    - 2022: Fight of the Year vs. Glover Teixeira, Ranked #2 Submission of the Year vs. Glover Teixeira & Ranked #9 Fighter of the Year
    - 2025: Ranked #5 Fighter of the Year (Tied with Valentina Shevchenko) & Ranked #2 Fight of the Year vs. Khalil Rountree Jr.
- Rizin Fighting Federation
  - RIZIN Light Heavyweight Championship (Inaugural; former)
    - One successful title defense
  - 2015 RIZIN World Grand Prix Runner Up
- Gladiator Championship Fighting
  - GCF Light Heavyweight Championship (Inaugural)
    - One successful title defense
- The Sporting News
  - 2022 Fight of the Year vs. Glover Teixeira at UFC 275
- Cageside Press
  - 2022 Fight of the Year vs. Glover Teixeira at UFC 275
  - 2025 Comeback of the Year vs. Khalil Rountree Jr.
  - 2025 Fight of the Year vs. Khalil Rountree Jr., tied with Van vs. Royval
- Combat Press
  - 2022 Fight of the Year vs. Glover Teixeira at UFC 275
  - 2025 Fight of the Year vs. Khalil Rountree Jr. at UFC 320
- ESPN
  - 2021 Midyear MMA Awards: Best Finish of the 1HY vs. Dominick Reyes at UFC on ESPN: Reyes vs. Procházka
  - 2022 Fight of the Year vs. Glover Teixeira at UFC 275
- Bleacher Report
  - 2022 UFC Fight of the Year vs. Glover Teixeira at UFC 275
- Fight Club News Awards
  - 2013 Czech Fight of the Year vs. Martin Šolc on December 7
- MMA Junkie
  - 2021 May Knockout of the Month vs. Dominick Reyes at UFC on ESPN: Reyes vs. Procházka
  - 2022 June Fight of the Month vs. Glover Teixeira at UFC 275
  - 2022 Fight of the Year vs. Glover Teixeira at UFC 275
- MMA Fighting
  - 2022 Fight of the Year vs. Glover Teixeira at UFC 275
  - 2025 Comeback of the Year vs. Khalil Rountree Jr. at UFC 320
  - 2025 First Team MMA All-Star
- MMA Mania
  - 2022 Fight of the Year vs. Glover Teixeira at UFC 275
  - 2025 Fight of the Year vs. Khalil Rountree Jr. at UFC 320
- Sherdog
  - 2022 Fight of the Year vs. Glover Teixeira at UFC 275
- World MMA Awards
  - 2022 Fight of the Year vs. Glover Teixeira at UFC 275
- Wrestling Observer Newsletter
  - 2022 MMA Match of the Year vs. Glover Teixeira at UFC 275
- Yahoo! Sports
  - 2022 Fight of the Year vs. Glover Teixeira at UFC 275
- CBS Sports
  - 2021 UFC Knockout of the Year vs. Dominick Reyes at UFC on ESPN: Reyes vs. Procházka
  - 2022 UFC Fight of the Year vs. Glover Teixeira at UFC 275
- LowKick MMA
  - 2025 Fight of the Year vs. Khalil Rountree Jr. at UFC 320

=== Muay Thai ===
- Czech Muay Thai Association
  - 2011 Czech National Championships champion (−86.18 kg)

== Mixed martial arts record ==
Professional record breakdown
| 40 matches | 32 wins | 7 losses |
| By knockout | 28 | 6 |
| By submission | 3 | 1 |
| By decision | 1 | 0 |
| Draws | 1 | |

| Res. | Record | Opponent | Method | Event | Date | Round | Time | Location | Notes |
|---|---|---|---|---|---|---|---|---|---|
| Loss | 32–7–1 | Navajo Stirling | KO (punches) | UFC Fight Night: Procházka vs. Stirling | November 21, 2026 | 2 | 4:58 | Al Rayyan, Qatar | |
| Loss | 32–6–1 | Carlos Ulberg | KO (punches) | UFC 327 | April 11, 2026 | 1 | 3:45 | Miami, Florida, United States | For the vacant UFC Light Heavyweight Championship. |
| Win | 32–5–1 | Khalil Rountree Jr. | KO (punches) | UFC 320 | October 4, 2025 | 3 | 3:04 | Las Vegas, Nevada, United States | Performance of the Night. Fight of the Night. |
| Win | 31–5–1 | Jamahal Hill | TKO (punches) | UFC 311 | January 18, 2025 | 3 | 3:01 | Inglewood, California, United States | Performance of the Night. |
| Loss | 30–5–1 | Alex Pereira | TKO (head kick and punches) | UFC 303 | June 29, 2024 | 2 | 0:13 | Las Vegas, Nevada, United States | For the UFC Light Heavyweight Championship. |
| Win | 30–4–1 | Aleksandar Rakić | TKO (punches) | UFC 300 | April 13, 2024 | 2 | 3:17 | Las Vegas, Nevada, United States | Performance of the Night. |
| Loss | 29–4–1 | Alex Pereira | TKO (elbows) | UFC 295 | November 11, 2023 | 2 | 4:08 | New York City, New York, United States | For the vacant UFC Light Heavyweight Championship. |
| Win | 29–3–1 | Glover Teixeira | Submission (rear-naked choke) | UFC 275 | June 12, 2022 | 5 | 4:32 | Kallang, Singapore | Won the UFC Light Heavyweight Championship. Fight of the Night. Later vacated the title due to injury. |
| Win | 28–3–1 | Dominick Reyes | KO (spinning back elbow) | UFC on ESPN: Reyes vs. Procházka | May 1, 2021 | 2 | 4:29 | Las Vegas, Nevada, United States | Performance of the Night. Fight of the Night. |
| Win | 27–3–1 | Volkan Oezdemir | KO (punch) | UFC 251 | July 12, 2020 | 2 | 0:49 | Abu Dhabi, United Arab Emirates | Performance of the Night. |
| Win | 26–3–1 | C. B. Dollaway | KO (punches) | Rizin 20 | December 31, 2019 | 1 | 1:55 | Saitama, Japan | Defended the Rizin Light Heavyweight Championship. |
| Win | 25–3–1 | Fábio Maldonado | KO (punches) | Rizin 19 | October 12, 2019 | 1 | 1:49 | Osaka, Japan | Catchweight (220 lb) bout. |
| Win | 24–3–1 | Muhammed Lawal | TKO (punches) | Rizin 15 | April 21, 2019 | 3 | 3:02 | Yokohama, Japan | Won the inaugural Rizin Light Heavyweight Championship. |
| Win | 23–3–1 | Brandon Halsey | TKO (submission to punches) | Rizin 14 | December 31, 2018 | 1 | 6:30 | Saitama, Japan | |
| Win | 22–3–1 | Jake Heun | TKO (punches) | Rizin 13 | September 30, 2018 | 1 | 4:29 | Saitama, Japan | |
| Win | 21–3–1 | Bruno Cappelozza | KO (punches) | Rizin 11 | July 28, 2018 | 1 | 1:23 | Saitama, Japan | |
| Win | 20–3–1 | Karl Albrektsson | TKO (punches) | Rizin World Grand Prix 2017: 2nd Round | December 29, 2017 | 1 | 9:57 | Saitama, Japan | |
| Win | 19–3–1 | Wilian Roberto Alves | TKO (punches) | Fusion Fight Night Series 16 | September 29, 2017 | 1 | 3:41 | Brno, Czech Republic | Return to Light Heavyweight. |
| Win | 18–3–1 | Mark Tanios | Decision (unanimous) | Rizin World Grand Prix 2016: 1st Round | September 25, 2016 | 2 | 5:00 | Saitama, Japan | 2016 Rizin Openweight Grand Prix First round. |
| Win | 17–3–1 | Kazuyuki Fujita | KO (punch) | Rizin 1 | April 17, 2016 | 1 | 3:18 | Nagoya, Japan | Catchweight (242 lb) bout. |
| Loss | 16–3–1 | Muhammed Lawal | KO (punch) | Rizin World Grand Prix 2015: Part 2 - Iza | December 31, 2015 | 1 | 5:09 | Saitama, Japan | 2015 Rizin Heavyweight Grand Prix Final. |
| Win | 16–2–1 | Vadim Nemkov | TKO (retirement) | Rizin World Grand Prix 2015: Part 2 - Iza | December 31, 2015 | 1 | 10:00 | Saitama, Japan | 2015 Rizin Heavyweight Grand Prix Semifinal. |
| Win | 15–2–1 | Satoshi Ishii | KO (head kick and knees) | Rizin World Grand Prix 2015: Part 1 - Saraba | December 29, 2015 | 1 | 1:36 | Saitama, Japan | Heavyweight debut. 2015 Rizin Heavyweight Grand Prix Quarterfinal. |
| Win | 14–2–1 | Evgeni Kondratov | KO (punch) | ProFC 59 | November 21, 2015 | 1 | 4:23 | Kursk, Russia | |
| Win | 13–2–1 | Michał Fijałka | TKO (corner stoppage) | Gladiator CF 31 | May 22, 2015 | 1 | 5:00 | Brno, Czech Republic | |
| Win | 12–2–1 | Rokas Stambrauskas | TKO (corner stoppage) | Gladiator CF: Back in the Fight 4 | March 27, 2015 | 1 | 5:00 | Příbram, Czech Republic | |
| Draw | 11–2–1 | Mikhail Mokhnatkin | Draw (majority) | Fight Nights Global 29 | December 20, 2014 | 3 | 5:00 | Moscow, Russia | |
| Win | 11–2 | Darko Stošić | TKO (punches) | Gladiator CF: Cage Fight 5 | November 14, 2014 | 1 | 1:09 | Brno, Czech Republic | |
| Win | 10–2 | Tomáš Penz | TKO (flying knee and punches) | Gladiator CF 28 | June 6, 2014 | 1 | 0:41 | Brno, Czech Republic | Defended the GCF Light Heavyweight Championship. |
| Win | 9–2 | Viktor Bogutzki | Submission (rear-naked choke) | Gladiator CF 27 | March 21, 2014 | 1 | 2:17 | Prague, Czech Republic | |
| Win | 8–2 | Martin Šolc | KO (flying knee) | Gladiator CF 26 | December 7, 2013 | 3 | 4:00 | Prague, Czech Republic | Won the inaugural GCF Light Heavyweight Championship. |
| Win | 7–2 | Oliver Dohring | TKO (punches) | Rock the Cage 4 | October 12, 2013 | 1 | N/A | Greifswald, Germany | |
| Loss | 6–2 | Abdul-Kerim Edilov | Submission (rear-naked choke) | Fight Nights Global 16 | June 20, 2013 | 1 | 1:56 | Moscow, Russia | |
| Win | 6–1 | Radovan Estocin | KO (flying knee and punches) | Gladiator CF 23 | May 10, 2013 | 1 | 0:26 | Brno, Czech Republic | |
| Win | 5–1 | Josef Žák | TKO (punches) | Gladiator CF 19 | February 15, 2013 | 1 | N/A | Příbram, Czech Republic | |
| Loss | 4–1 | Bojan Veličković | TKO (punches) | Supreme FC 1 | December 9, 2012 | 1 | N/A | Belgrade, Serbia | Catchweight (200 lb) bout. |
| Win | 4–0 | Strahinja Denić | Submission (triangle choke) | Ring Fight Brno 1 | November 15, 2012 | 1 | 2:10 | Brno, Czech Republic | |
| Win | 3–0 | Martin Vaniš | TKO (punches) | Gladiator CF 17 | October 20, 2012 | 1 | 2:48 | Ostrava, Czech Republic | |
| Win | 2–0 | Vladimír Eis | KO (knee) | Gladiator CF 15 | August 24, 2012 | 1 | 1:02 | Karlovy Vary, Czech Republic | |
| Win | 1–0 | Stanislav Futera | KO (punch) | Gladiator CF 10 | April 7, 2012 | 1 | 0:53 | Mladá Boleslav, Czech Republic | Light Heavyweight debut. |

== Pay-per-view bouts ==
| No. | Event | Fight | Date | Venue | City | PPV Buys |
|---|---|---|---|---|---|---|
| 1. | UFC 275 | Teixeira vs. Procházka | June 12, 2022 | Singapore Indoor Stadium | Kallang, Singapore | Not Disclosed |
| 2. | UFC 295 | Procházka vs. Pereira | November 11, 2023 | Madison Square Garden | New York City, New York, United States | Not Disclosed |
| 3. | UFC 303 | Pereira vs. Procházka 2 | June 29, 2024 | T-Mobile Arena | Las Vegas, Nevada, United States | Not Disclosed |

== See also ==
- List of current UFC fighters
- List of male mixed martial artists

== Filmography ==
=== Television ===
| Year | Title | Role | Notes |
|---|---|---|---|
| 2020 | Jiří Procházka: The Conscious Fighter | Himself | TV Documentary |

=== Web ===
| Year | Title | Role | Notes |
|---|---|---|---|
| 2019 | Blbej den (English: Bad Day) | Karateka / Himself | Anthology streaming TV miniseries Lead role Episode: "Karate je svinstvo (English: Karate Is a Hell of a Thing)"; Season 1 Episode 9 |

Awards and achievements
| Preceded by Glover Teixeira | 17th UFC Light Heavyweight Champion; 11 June 2022 – 23 November 2022; Vacated | Succeeded by Jamahal Hill |
