= 2016 in Rizin Fighting Federation =

Information
- First date: April 17
- Last date: December 31

Events
- Total events: 4

Fights

Chronology
2015 in Rizin Fighting Federation	2016 in Rizin Fighting Federation	2017 in Rizin Fighting Federation

The year 2016 was the second year in the history of the Rizin Fighting Federation, a mixed martial arts promotion based in Japan. The first event of the year was Rizin 1 on April 17, 2016, in Nagoya.

Rizin events are broadcast through a television agreement with Fuji Television.

== Background ==
On July 16, 2016 Nobuyuki Sakakibara announced at a press conference that Rizin Fighting Federation will host a 16-man openweight tournament September 25 in Tokyo. 2006 Pride Open-Weight Grand Prix Champion Mirko Cro Cop and former PRIDE Middleweight Champion Wanderlei Silva to participate in the tournament.

This tournament was included Pride FC veterans like Kazuyuki Fujita, Tsuyoshi Kosaka, Heath Herring, Sumo sensation Baruto Kaito, world class wrestler Amir Aliakbari, and Rizin GP 2015 winner King Mo

Cro Cop won the championship.

== List of events ==
#	Event	Date	Venue	Location	Attendance
1	Rizin 1	April 17, 2016	Nippon Gaishi Hall	Nagoya, Japan	7,291
2	Rizin World Grand Prix 2016: 1st Round	September 25, 2016	Saitama Super Arena	Saitama, Japan	15,011
3	Rizin World Grand Prix 2016: 2nd Round	December 29, 2016	Saitama Super Arena	Saitama, Japan	16,642
4	Rizin World Grand Prix 2016: Final Round	December 31, 2016	Saitama Super Arena	Saitama, Japan	19,357

== Rizin Openweight Grand Prix 2016 bracket ==
1st Round; Rizin World Grand-Prix 2016: 1st Round
(Brazil) Wanderlei Silva
BYE
(Croatia) Mirko Cro Cop	SUB
(South Korea) Hyun Man Myung	2:20
(Estonia) Baruto Kaito	DEC
(Japan) Kazuyuki Fujita	10:00
(Czech Republic) Jiří Procházka	DEC
(Lebanon) Mark Tanios	10:00
(Brazil) João Almeida	2:25
(Iran) Amir Aliakbari	TKO
(United States) Shane Carwin
BYE
(Russia) Valentin Moldavsky	DEC
(Sweden) Karl Albrektsson	10:00
(Poland) Szymon Bajor	DEC
(Lithuania) Teodoras Aukštuolis	15:00

2nd Round; Rizin World Grand-Prix 2016: 2nd Round
(United States) Muhammed Lawal^{2}	6:41
(Croatia) Mirko Cro Cop	TKO
(Estonia) Baruto Kaito	DEC
(Japan) Tsuyoshi Kohsaka^{1}	10:00
(Iran) Amir Aliakbari	DEC
(United States) Heath Herring^{3}	10:00
(Russia) Valentin Moldavsky	DEC
(Poland) Szymon Bajor	10:00

Semifinals; Rizin World Grand-Prix 2016: Final Round
(Croatia) Mirko Cro Cop	TKO
(Estonia) Baruto Kaito	0:49
(Iran) Amir Aliakbari	DEC
(Russia) Valentin Moldavsky	10:00

Final; Rizin World Grand-Prix 2016: Final Round
(Croatia) Mirko Cro Cop	KO
(Iran) Amir Aliakbari	2:03

^{1}Jiří Procházka was injured and couldn't participate in the second round of the Grand Prix, and was subsequently replaced by Tsuyoshi Kohsaka.

^{2}Wanderlei Silva retired from the tournament, was replaced by Muhammed Lawal.

^{3}Shane Carwin withdrew from the tournament, was replaced by Heath Herring.

== Rizin 1 ==
Rizin Fighting Federation 1
- Promotion: Rizin Fighting Federation
- Date: April 17, 2016
- Venue: Nippon Gaishi Hall
- City: Nagoya, Japan

Event chronology
Rizin World Grand-Prix 2015:Part 2 - Iza	Rizin Fighting Federation 1	Rizin World Grand-Prix 2016: 1st Round

Rizin Fighting Federation 1 was a mixed martial arts event held by the Rizin Fighting Federation on April 4, 2016 at the Nippon Gaishi Hall in Nagoya, Japan.

=== Results ===
Fight Card
Weight Class				Method	Round	Time	Notes
Catchweight 110 kg	(Czech Republic) Jiří Procházka	def.	(Japan) Kazuyuki Fujita	KO (Punch)	1	3:33	
Light Heavyweight 93 kg	(Sweden) Karl Albrektsson	def.	(Russia) Vadim Nemkov	Decision (Split)	3	20:00	
Catchweight 98 kg	(Lithuania) Teodoras Aukštuolis	def.	(India) Singh Jaideep	Decision (Unanimous)	3	20:00	
Female Openweight	(Brazil) Gabi Garcia	def.	(Russia) Anna Maliukova	Submission (Armbar)	2	7:05	
Tag Team Grappling Match	(Japan) Kazushi Sakuraba / (Japan) Hideo Tokoro	vs.	(Brazil) Wanderlei Silva / (Japan) Kiyoshi Tamura	Draw	1	15:00	
Shootboxing 51 kg	(Japan) Rena Kubota	def.	(Brazil) Cyndi Alves	Decision (Unanimous)	3	9:00	
Lightweight 70 kg	(United States) Daron Cruickshank	def.	(Japan) Shinji Sasaki	TKO (Soccer Kicks)	1	4:36	
Openweight	(Russia) Kirill Sidelnikov	def.	(United States) Chris Barnett	Decision (Split)	3	20:00	
Catchweight 81.5 kg	(Japan) Hisaki Kato	def.	(Japan) Yuta Watanabe	TKO (Punches)	1	1:04	
Female Strawweight 52 kg	(Japan) Kanako Murata	def.	(Russia) Natalya Denisova	Decision (Unanimous)	3	15:00	
K-1 Featherweight 65 kg	(Japan) Tetsuya Yamato	def.	(Japan) Hiroto Yamaguchi	TKO (3 Knockdowns)	1	2:37	
K-1 Catchweight 73 kg	(Brazil) Danilo Zanolini	def.	(Japan) Norihisa Amimoto	TKO (3 Knockdowns)	1	2:19	
K-1 Catchweight 60 kg	(Japan) Yuya	def.	(Japan) Yuki	TKO (3 Knockdowns)	1	1:06	

== Rizin World Grand Prix 2016: 1st Round ==
Rizin World Grand-Prix 2016: 1st Round
- Promotion: Rizin Fighting Federation
- Date: September 25, 2016
- Venue: Saitama Super Arena
- City: Saitama, Japan

Event chronology
Rizin Fighting Federation 1	Rizin World Grand-Prix 2016: 1st Round	Rizin World Grand-Prix 2016: 2nd Round

Rizin World Grand-Prix 2016: 1st Round was a mixed martial arts event held by the Rizin Fighting Federation on September 25, 2016 at the Saitama Super Arena in Saitama, Japan.

=== Results ===
Fight Card
Weight Class				Method	Round	Time	Notes
Featherweight 66 kg	(Brazil) Kron Gracie	def.	(Japan) Hideo Tokoro	Submission (Rear Naked Choke)	1	9:50	
Female Atomweight 49 kg	(Japan) Rena Kubota	def.	(Japan) Miyuu Yamamoto	Submission (Guillotine Choke)	1	4:50	
Openweight	(Croatia) Mirko Cro Cop	def.	(South Korea) Hyun Man Myung	Submission (Arm Triangle Choke)	1	2:20	Openweight Grand-Prix 1st Round
Openweight	(Estonia) Baruto Kaito	def.	(Japan) Kazuyuki Fujita	Decision (Unanimous)	2	10:00	Openweight Grand-Prix 1st Round
Lightweight 70 kg	(United States) Daron Cruickshank	def.	(Netherlands) Andy Souwer	Submission (Rear Naked Choke)	1	4:10	
Bantamweight 61 kg	(Japan) Erson Yamamoto	def.	(Japan) Kizaemon Saiga	Decision (Split)	2	15:00	
Openweight	(Czech Republic) Jiří Procházka	def.	(Lebanon) Mark Tanios	Decision (Unanimous)	2	10:00	Openweight Grand-Prix 1st Round
Openweight	(Russia) Valentin Moldavsky	def.	(Sweden) Karl Albrektsson	Decision (Unanimous)	2	10:00	Openweight Grand-Prix 1st Round
Openweight	(Iran) Amir Aliakbari	def.	(Brazil) João Almeida	TKO (Punches)	1	2:25	Openweight Grand-Prix 1st Round
Openweight	(Poland) Szymon Bajor	def.	(Lithuania) Teodoras Aukštuolis	Decision (Unanimous)	2	10:00	Openweight Grand-Prix 1st Round
Featherweight 66 kg	(United States) Charles Bennett	def.	(Brazil) Minoru Kimura	TKO (Punches)	1	0:07	
Female Strawweight 53 kg	(Japan) Kanako Murata	def.	(United States) Kyra Batara	Decision (Unanimous)	3	15:00	
Female Openweight	(Brazil) Gabi Garcia	def.	(United States) Destanie Yarbrough	Submission (Americana)	1	2:42	

== Rizin World Grand Prix 2016: 2nd Round ==
Rizin World Grand-Prix 2016: 2nd Round
- Promotion: Rizin Fighting Federation
- Date: December 29, 2016
- Venue: Saitama Super Arena
- City: Saitama, Japan

Event chronology
Rizin World Grand-Prix 2016: 1st Round	Rizin World Grand-Prix 2016: 2nd Round	Rizin World Grand-Prix 2016: Final Round

Rizin World Grand-Prix 2016: 2nd Round was a mixed martial arts event held by the Rizin Fighting Federation on December 29, 2016 at the Saitama Super Arena in Saitama, Japan.

Background

Jiří Procházka was injured and couldn't participate in the second round of the Grand Prix, and was subsequently replaced by Tsuyoshi Kohsaka.

Mirko Cro Cop was originally scheduled to have a rematch with Wanderlei Silva in the Openweight Grand-Prix Quarter-Finals. However, on December 2, Silva withdrew from the bout. He was subsequently replaced by Muhammed Lawal.

Shane Carwin was originally announced as an Openweight entrant against Amir Aliakbari. However, he pulled out of the tournament for undisclosed reasons and was replaced by Heath Herring.

=== Results ===
Fight Card
Weight Class				Method	Round	Time	Notes
Openweight	(Croatia) Mirko Cro Cop	def.	(United States) Muhammed Lawal	TKO (Punches)	2	1:41	Openweight Grand-Prix Quarter-Finals
Openweight	(Estonia) Baruto Kaito	def.	(Japan) Tsuyoshi Kosaka	Decision (Unanimous)	2	10:00	Openweight Grand-Prix Quarter-Finals
Openweight	(Iran) Amir Aliakbari	def.	(United States) Heath Herring	Decision (Unanimous)	2	10:00	Openweight Grand-Prix Quarter-Finals
Openweight	(Russia) Valentin Moldavsky	def.	(Poland) Szymon Bajor	Decision (Unanimous)	2	10:00	Openweight Grand-Prix Quarter-Finals
Female Flyweight 57 kg	(Japan) Rin Nakai	def.	(Japan) Kanako Murata	Submission (Rear Naked Choke)	3	11:16	
Flyweight 57 kg	(Japan) Tenshin Nasukawa	def.	(Ukraine) Nikita Sapun	TKO (Punches)	1	2:45	
Lightweight 70 kg	(Japan) Kazuyuki Miyata	def.	(Netherlands) Andy Souwer	Submission (Armbar)	1	4:39	
Bantamweight 61 kg	(Japan) Yuki Motoya	def.	(Brazil) Allan Nascimento	Decision (Split)	2	15:00	
Flyweight 58 kg	(Japan) Tatsumitsu Wada	def.	(New Zealand) Kai Kara-France	Decision (Unanimous)	3	15:00	
Featherweight 66 kg	(Japan) Yusuke Yachi	def.	(Philippines) Mario Sismundo	TKO (Knee to the Body)	1	0:18	
Female Atomweight 48 kg	(United States) Alyssa Garcia	def.	(Japan) Kanna Asakura	Decision (Unanimous)	3	15:00	
Openweight	(Russia) Vadim Nemkov	def.	(Brazil) Alison Vicente	TKO (Punches)	1	0:54	Openweight Grand-Prix Reserve Fight
Lightweight 70 kg	(Japan) Satoru Kitaoka	def.	(United States) Daron Cruickshank	Submission (Guillotine Choke)	1	8:18	

== Rizin World Grand Prix 2016: Final Round ==
Rizin World Grand-Prix 2016: Final Round
- Promotion: Rizin Fighting Federation
- Date: December 31, 2016
- Venue: Saitama Super Arena
- City: Saitama, Japan

Event chronology
Rizin World Grand-Prix 2016: 2nd Round	Rizin World Grand-Prix 2016: Final Round	Rizin Fighting Federation 5 - Sakura

Rizin World Grand-Prix 2016: Final Round was a mixed martial arts event held by the Rizin Fighting Federation on December 31, 2016 at the Saitama Super Arena in Saitama, Japan.

Background

Charles Bennett was originally set to fight against Minoru Kimura. However, Bennett withdrew from the bout due to problems obtaining a visa. Shinobu Kandori was originally set to take on Gabi Garcia, but was replaced by Yumiko Hotta after suffering a rib injury.

=== Results ===
Fight Card
Weight Class				Method	Round	Time	Notes
Openweight	(Croatia) Mirko Cro Cop	def.	(Iran) Amir Aliakbari	KO (Punches)	1	2:03	Openweight Grand-Prix Final
Featherweight 66 kg	(Brazil) Kron Gracie	def.	(Japan) Tatsuya Kawajiri	Submission (Rear Naked Choke)	2	12:05	
Bantamweight 62 kg	(Japan) Hideo Tokoro	def.	(Japan) Erson Yamamoto	Submission (Armbar)	1	1:19	
Female Atomweight 49 kg	(Japan) Rena Kubota	def.	(Poland) Hanna Gujwan	TKO (Body Kick)	3	12:47	
Female Atomweight 49 kg	(United States) Andy Nguyen	def.	(Japan) Miyuu Yamamoto	Submission (Armbar)	1	4:42	
Flyweight 58 kg	(Japan) Kizaemon Saiga	def.	(South Africa) Dillin West	TKO (Punches)	1	2:03	
Female Openweight	(Brazil) Gabi Garcia	def.	(Japan) Yumiko Hotta	TKO (Punches)	1	0:41	
Catchweight 82 kg	(Japan) Hayato Sakurai	def.	(Japan) Wataru Sakata	TKO (Punches)	2	12:37	
Openweight	(Iran) Amir Aliakbari	def.	(Russia) Valentin Moldavsky	Decision (Split)	2	10:00	Openweight Grand-Prix Semi-Finals
Openweight	(Croatia) Mirko Cro Cop	def.	(Estonia) Baruto Kaito	KO (Knee to the Body)	1	0:49	Openweight Grand-Prix Semi-Finals
Flyweight 57 kg	(Japan) Tenshin Nasukawa	def.	(United States) Dylan Kawika Oligo	Submission (Guillotine Choke)	2	3:37	
