= Student-run advertising agency =

A student-run advertising agency acts like a real advertising agency, but is operated by students. The student-run agency [SRA] is a business operating within, or in close association with, an academic program in a college or university. When an agency is part of the academic curriculum, students work in the agency for academic credit. Alternatively, the SRA can simply be housed within the academic unit, allowing students to work in the agency for volunteer experience. The SRA can operate as a student club within the broader organizational structure of the university. The SRA provides advertising and similar communications services (public relations, marketing, social media, etc.) to various organizations such as college departments, small businesses, and community-based non-profit organizations. Some SRAs compete with professionals and charge for services. Other SRAs do all their work without charge. Other SRAs have a philanthropic focus whereby communications work is conducted for free for nonprofits, while for-profit entities are asked to make a charitable donation to the agency to support its learner-centered focus. Most SRAs tend to take an integrated marketing communications focus, combining advertising with public relations and other services.] The COVID pandemic resulted in a large number of SRAs ceasing operations. Many of those agencies have not returned to service.

== Services ==
As is the case with communications agencies in the real world, student-run agencies typically offer a variety of support to clients, including public relations, marketing, promotions, and social media support. The main appeal of a student-run advertising agency for clients is that the agency can provide professional-quality work at no cost or very small cost. The primary appeal for students is that they gain real-world experience unlike anything that can result from a traditional classroom experience. Students working in this environment have to mentor each other. Students learn to engage in "reverse mentoring" whereby they typically have more experience and knowledge of communication than their clients - so they must educate the clients. In all agency environments, development of time management and teamwork skills is essential. Students must collaborate to produce work that satisfies the client and the agency supervisor (typically a faculty member). The work must be academically appropriate and professionally relevant. This balance of responsibilities and oversight makes the student-run agency an ideal learning experience and preparation for the professional workplace.
