= 2008 in Jewels =

Mixed martial arts events

Information
- First date: November 16, 2008
- Last date: November 16, 2008

Events
- Total events: 1

Fights
- Total fights: 11

Chronology
2008 in Jewels	2009 in Jewels

The year 2008 is the 1st year in the history of Jewels, a mixed martial arts promotion based in Japan. In 2008 Jewels held 1 event, Jewels 1st Ring.

== Events list ==
#	Event title	Date	Arena	Location	Attendance
1	Jewels 1st Ring	November 16, 2008	Shinjuku Face	Tokyo, Japan	645

== Jewels 1st Ring ==
Jewels 1st Ring was an event held on November 16, 2008, at Shinjuku Face in Tokyo, Japan.

=== Results ===
Main Card
Weight class				Method	Round	Time	Notes
	Saori Ishioka	def.	Mika Nagano	Decision (Unanimous)	2	5:00
	Megumi Fujii	def.	Tomoko Morii	Submission (Armbar)	1	1:05
	Hiroko Yamanaka	def.	Mayumi Aoki	Decision (Unanimous)	2	5:00
	Hitomi Akano	def.	Mika Harigai	Submission (Armbar)	1	0:38
	Misaki Takimoto	def.	Masako Yoshida	Decision (Unanimous)	2	5:00
	Sachiko Yamamoto	def.	Kazumi Kaneko	Technical Submission (Armbar)	1	4:34
	Kikuyo Ishikawa	def.	Sumie Yamada	Submission (Triangle Choke)	1	1:02
	Shizuka Sugiyama	def.	Harumi Harumi	Submission (Rear-Naked Choke)	1	2:55
	Shiho Shiho	def.	Mayu Yamagishi	KO (Punches)	1	2:41
	Rina Tomita	def.	Miki Miki	Submission (Armbar)	1	1:25
	Yuko Oya	def.	Misaki Ozawa	Submission (Armbar)	1	4:03

== See also ==
- Jewels
