= Jewels 1st Ring =

Mixed martial arts event in 2008

- The poster for Jewels 1st Ring
- Promotion: Jewels
- Date: November 16, 2008
- Venue: Shinjuku Face
- City: Kabukicho, Tokyo, Japan
- Attendance: 645

Event chronology
Jewels 1st Ring	Jewels 2nd Ring

Jewels 1st Ring, originally Jewels raising an army match (JEWELS 旗揚げ戦, jewels hataage sen) was the inaugural mixed martial arts (MMA) event of the then newly created women's MMA promotion Jewels. The event took place on November 16, 2008 at Shinjuku Face in Kabukicho, Tokyo, Japan.

== Background ==
Women's promotion Smackgirl had faced several problems prior to being bought by Marverous Japan. The new parent company decided to change the promotion's name into Jewels to have a fresh start. It was decided that the first events would have the same rules as Smackgirl and broadcast on Samurai TV in Japan. The event was first announced on October 24, 2008.

The first four matches announced were Saori Ishioka vs. Mika Nagano, Misaki Takimoto vs. Masako Yoshida, Sachiko Yamamoto vs. Kazumi Kaneko and Harumi Harumi vs. Shizuka Sugiyama. Abe Ani Combat Club members Megumi Fujii and Hitomi Akano were confirmed for the card at a press conference held on November 7, 2008. The rest of the card was announced a few days later.

== Results ==
Main Card
Weight class				Method	Round	Time	Notes
	Saori Ishioka	def.	Mika Nagano	Decision (Unanimous)	2	5:00
	Megumi Fujii	def.	Tomoko Morii	Submission (Armbar)	1	1:05
	Hiroko Yamanaka	def.	Mayumi Aoki	Decision (Unanimous)	2	5:00
	Hitomi Akano	def.	Mika Harigai	Submission (Armbar)	1	0:38
	Misaki Takimoto	def.	Masako Yoshida	Decision (Unanimous)	2	5:00
	Sachiko Yamamoto	def.	Kazumi Kaneko	Technical Submission (Armbar)	1	4:34
	Kikuyo Ishikawa	def.	Sumie Yamada	Submission (Triangle Choke)	1	1:02
	Shizuka Sugiyama	def.	Harumi Harumi	Submission (Rear-Naked Choke)	1	2:55
	Shiho Shiho	def.	Mayu Yamagishi	KO (Punches)	1	2:41
	Rina Tomita	def.	Miki Miki	Submission (Armbar)	1	1:25
	Yuko Oya	def.	Misaki Ozawa	Submission (Armbar)	1	4:03

== See also ==
- Jewels (mixed martial arts)
- 2008 in Jewels
