= Jewels 7th Ring =

Mixed martial arts event in 2010

- The poster for Jewels 7th Ring
- Promotion: Jewels
- Date: March 19, 2010
- Venue: Shinjuku Face
- City: Kabukicho, Tokyo, Japan
- Attendance: 696

Event chronology
Jewels 6th Ring	Jewels 7th Ring	Jewels 8th Ring

Jewels 7th Ring was a mixed martial arts (MMA) event hosted by MMA promotion Jewels. It was held on March 19, 2010 at Shinjuku Face in Kabukicho, Tokyo, Japan.

== Background ==
Jewels events for 2010 were announced in January 2010. On February 17, 2010, Jewels announced the first four fights of the event with Hitomi Akano versus Hiroko Yamanaka headlining it. On March 3, 2010, three more fights were added to the card. The weigh-ins and fight order announcement were done on March 18, 2010. The card featured a special exhibition match between kickboxers Rena Kubota and Seo Hee Ham. During the event, Miku Matsumoto announced her retirement exhibition match with Megumi Fujii at DEEP: 47th Impact, and Megumi Yabushita and Yoko Takahashi announced their partnership with American clothing brand Fight Chix.

== Results ==
=== Opening fight ===
- 1st match: Jewels grappling rules -48 kg bout, 4 min / 1 R

(Japan) Shiho Yaginuma (ankurapudo Kokubunji) vs. (Japan) Satoko Chemed (P's Lab Yokohama)

Yaginuma defeated Kameda by submission (armbar) at 2:20 of round 1.

=== Main card ===
- 1st match: Jewels official rules -52 kg bout, 5 min / 2 R

(Japan) Yoko Kagoshima (Shinagawa CS) vs. (Japan) Sakura Nomura (Club Barbarian Impact)

Nomura defeated Kagoshima by technical submission (referee stoppage, armbar) at 4:35 of round 1.

Round one was controlled by Nomura's grappling. Kagoshima reacted with punches in the second round but Nomura got a takedown and followed it with an armbar to end the fight.

- 2nd match: Jewels official rules -48 kg bout, 5 min / 2 R

(Japan) Kikuyo Ishikawa (freelance) vs. (Japan) Miyoko Kusaka (GRABAKA)

Kusaka defeated Ishikawa by decision (1-2).

In the first round Ishikawa took the offense and tried submissions on Kusaka, but Kusaka defended and counteracted with a takedown, trying to gain control, but Ishikawa scrambled. In the second round, Kusaka started the offensive and took Ishikawa once again, controlling Ishikawa and striking her body. At the end, the split decision was awarded to Kusaka.

- 3rd match: Jewels official rules -52 kg bout, 5 min / 2 R

(Japan) Hiroko Kitamura (Zendokai Koganei) vs. (Norway) Celine Haga (Hellboy Hansen MMA)

Kitamura defeated Haga by technical submission (referee stoppage, Kimura) at 2:04 of round 1.

Kitamura quickly overwhelmed Haga and Haga was only able to retreat and try a kneebar before Haga locked a Kimura on Haga's arm, which made the referee stop the fight.

- Special exhibition match

(Japan) Rena Kubota (Oikawa dojo) vs. (South Korea) Seo Hee Ham (CMA Korea)

No winner.

- 4th match: Shoot boxing official rules -54 kg bout, 2 min / 3 R

(Japan) Ai Takahashi (Caesar gym) vs. (Japan) Asako (U-File Camp Gifu)

Takahashi defeated Asako by TKO (referee stoppage, chin injury) at 1:08 of round 2.

Takahashi started aggressively attacking Asako, quickly overwhelming Asako and broking her nose. At the beginning of the second round, the referee stopped the fight to have Asako checked by the ring doctor. After restarting Takahashi threw a barrage of punches, which prompted the referee to stop the fight concerned about her broken chin.

- 5th match: Jewels official rules -58 kg bout, 5 min / 2 R

(Japan) Miki Morifuji (T-Blood) vs. (Japan) Shizuka Sugiyama (Zendokai Yokohama)

Sugiyama defeated Morifuji by decision (3-0).

Sugiyama tried to keep the fight on the ground, but Morifuji was able to punch Sugiyama avoiding her submission attempts. During the second round, Morifuji reversed Sugiyama's takedowns and kept punching her to win the unanimous decision.

- 6th match: Jewels official rules -52 kg bout, 5 min / 2 R

(Japan) Mika Nagano (S-Keep/Core) vs. (Japan) Mai Ichii (Ice Ribbon)

Nagano defeated Ichii by decision (3-0).

Despite not being able to submit Ichii, Nagano dominated both rounds with her wrestling skills, leaving Ichii unable to mount any significant offense, which gave Nagano the unanimous decision.

- 7th match, main event: Jewels official rules -65 kg bout, 5 min / 2 R

Hitomi Akano (Abe Ani Combat Club) vs. Hiroko Yamanaka (Master Japan)

Yamanaka defeated Akano by decision (1-2).

Yamanaka started the first round landing punching combinations on Akano. Akano tried to take Yamanaka down, but Yamanaka defended and kept striking and controlling Akano and escaping any submission attempt thrown by Akano. In the second round, Akano continued to try takedowns, but Yamanaka also kept striking Akano. As Akano managed to get a takedown, she tried to finish the fight with punches, but was unable due to the time expiring. Since neither fighter was able to score decisive points, the judges ruled a split decision victory for Yamanaka, who successfully defended Akano attacks and landed several good strikes.
