= Jewels 2nd Ring =

Mixed martial arts event in 2009

- The poster for Jewels 2nd Ring
- Promotion: Jewels
- Date: February 4, 2009
- Venue: Shinjuku Face
- City: Kabukicho, Tokyo, Japan
- Attendance: 588

Event chronology
Jewels 1st Ring	Jewels 2nd Ring	Jewels 3rd Ring

Jewels 2nd Ring, was a mixed martial arts (MMA) event, the second of women's MMA promotion Jewels. The event was held on February 4, 2009 at Shinjuku Face in Kabukicho, Tokyo, Japan.

== Background ==
In January 2009, the event was first announced and a few days later the first bouts were announced, Hiroko Yamanaka vs. Michiko Takeda, Misaki Takimoto vs. Yasuko Tamada, Masako Yoshida vs. Shinsaki Ozawa and Shizuka Sugiyama vs. Shiho Shiho, along with the participation of Saori Ishioka and Mayumi Aoki. On January 23, 2009, debutants Hanako Kobayashi and Chihiro Oikawa were added to the card. The card had a rematch between Hiroko Yamanaka and Michiko Takeda, who had previously fought in Smackgirl in 2007, with Yamanaka winning the bout by split decision.

== Results ==
Main Card
Weight class				Method	Round	Time	Notes
-52 kg	Saori Ishioka	def.	Hanako Kobayashi	TKO (Punches)	1	2:20	(Note: Kobayashi landed kicks on Ishioka at the start of the fight. Ishioka countered with punches to the face and the fight became a striking exchange between the two, which ended in a standing count for debutant pro-wrestler Kobayashi. Kobayashi tried once again the kicks and Ishioka responded with punches which gave Kobayashi a second standing count. Shortly after, Ishioka finished the fight with punches.)
Openweight	Hiroko Yamanaka	def.	Michiko Takeda	TKO (Punches)	2	3:25	(Note: Takeda was dominated during the first round by the striking ability of Yamanaka, who effectively used her height advantage, landing low-kicks and punches. At the end of round one, Takeda tried to apply a heel hook which Yamanaka avoided and countered with more strikes. The next round was also dominated by Yamanaka, who made Takeda take a standing count a little before being dropped with a one-two combination that forced the referee to stop the fight.)
-66 kg	Yasuko Tamada	def.	Misaki Takimoto	Decision (Unanimous)	2	5:00	(Note: Takimoto landed punches and kicks in the first round, until Tamada took the fight to the ground, where she controlled position. Returned to their feet, Takimoto once again took then offense but Tamada took her down again. In the second round, Tamada landed punching combinations and, combined with take-downs, Tamada controlled the second round, earning a unanimous decision victory over Takimoto.)
Openweight	Mayumi Aoki	def.	Chihiro Oikawa	Submission (Armbar)	2	2:30	(Note: In the first round, pro wrestler Oikawa threw some jabs which managed to create some distance until Aoki started to counterattack with hooks and straights, and eventually Aoki dropped Oikawa with a right hook. During the course of the second round, Aoki landed kicks and knees that made the referee give Oikawa two standing counts. Oikawa pulled guard and attempted to get an armbar but Aoki defended and applied an armbar herself, forcing Oikawa to submit.)
-52 kg	Masako Yoshida	def.	Misaki Ozawa	TKO (Doctor Stoppage)	1	0:54	(Note: Ozawa started the fight with looping punches that damaged Yoshida and Yoshida countered with punches and kicks. After Yoshida got a take-down and Ozawa reversed it, the referee stopped the fight to check Ozawa's nose, which had a non-bloody liquid streaming. The flow could not be stopped and the doctor called the bout, giving the TKO victory to Yoshida.)
-60 kg	Shizuka Sugiyama	def.	Shiho Shiho	TKO (Knees to the Body and Punches)	1	2:55	(Note: Starting with a flying knee, Sugiyama attacked Shiho with punches and kicks for the whole fight, while Shiho was only able to do some sweeps to try to defend. After the fourth standing count, the referee stopped the fight.)
-60 kg	Rina Tomita	def.	Harumi Harumi	Submission (Armbar)	2	0:22	(Note: At the beginning of the fight, Tomita exchanged strikes with Harumi, landing effective punches and kicks to Harumi's arms and body. As Harumi responded, Tomita took the fight to the ground where she held the advantage for the rest of round 1. In the second round, Tomita countered a take-down with an armbar, forcing Harumi to submit.)
Jewels amateur rules
-48 kg	Miyoko Kusaka	def.	Satoko Kameda	Submission (Guillotine Choke)	1	2:23
Jewels grappling rules
-55 kg	Rikako Yuasa	def.	Yuko Oya	decision 0-3

== See also ==
- Jewels (mixed martial arts)
- 2009 in Jewels
