= Megumi Fujii =

Japanese mixed martial artist

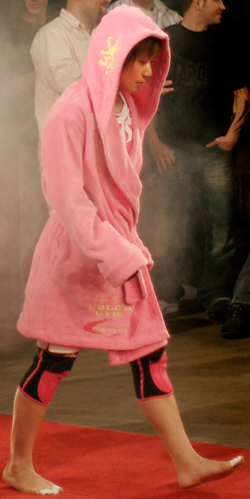
- Fujii in 2007
- Born: April 26, 1974 (age 52); Ibara, Okayama, Japan
- Other names: Mega Megu
- Height: 5 ft 3 in (160 cm)
- Weight: 115 lb (52 kg; 8 st 3 lb)
- Division: Strawweight
- Reach: 61 in (155 cm)
- Style: Catch wrestling, combat sambo
- Stance: Southpaw
- Fighting out of: Tokyo, Japan
- Team: Abe Ani Combat Club
- Rank: Black belt in judo Black belt in Brazilian jiu-jitsu
- Years active: 2004–2013 (MMA)

Mixed martial arts record
- Total: 29
- Wins: 26
- By knockout: 1
- By submission: 19
- By decision: 6
- Losses: 3
- By decision: 3

Other information
- Mixed martial arts record from Sherdog

Megumi Fujii (藤井 恵 Fujii Megumi, born April 26, 1974) is a Japanese former professional mixed martial artist and submission wrestler. Fujii is regarded as a pioneer of women's mixed martial arts. She specializes in submission fighting and is known for her quick takedowns and submissions. Her most popular move is the Inazuma toe hold submission, dubbed the Megulock.

== Background ==
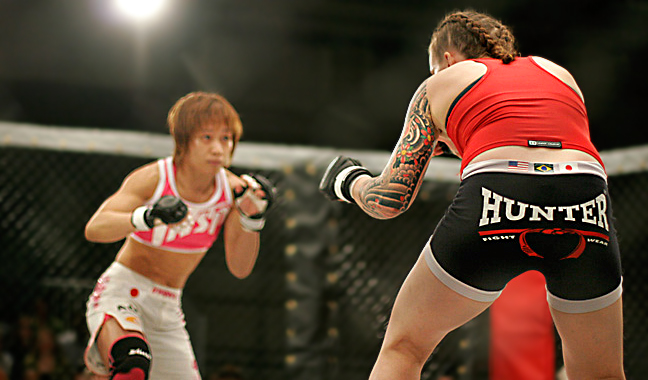
Fujii (left) vs. Cody Welchlin (right) in 2013.

Fujii started judo at the age of three due to her father's influence and continued competing at Shukugawa Gakuin Junior High School and Kokushikan University. She retired from judo after graduating from university with a degree in physical education, and became interested in combat sambo.

Fujii was trained in MMA and catch wrestling by Shooto veteran Hiroyuki Abe and Josh Barnett, a former UFC Heavyweight Champion and King of Pancrase. She has trained several other female MMA fighters herself, including Hitomi Akano.

Fujii is a decorated grappler, including being a Japanese national sambo and Brazilian jiu-jitsu champion, four second place finishes in the World Sambo Championships, and 2004 and 2006 Pan-American jiu-jitsu champion.

In 2005, the first year women competed at the ADCC World Championships, Fujii won bronze in the -60 kg division. She won bronze again at the 2007 ADCC World Championships in the -55 kg division.

Fujii was also a multi-time contestant on the seasonal Japanese obstacle course television show Sasuke (Ninja Warrior), but never made it past the first stage.

== Mixed martial arts career ==
Fujii debuted in mixed martial arts on August 5, 2004 and defeated Yumi Matsumoto by submission in 40 seconds. She then went on to defeat former UFC commentator Erica Montoya at HOOKnSHOOT: "Evolution" in what would be Montoya's final fight.

Further wins over Ana Michelle Tavares, Misaki Takimoto, Keiko "Tama Chan" Tamai and Masako Yoshida established Fujii as one of the top female fighters in the world and she became a staple of Shooto and Smackgirl events.

On November 29, 2006, she faced Australian fighter Serin Murray. Murray claimed before the fight that she studied Fujii tactics and that she would defeat Fujii by KO. However, the Australian fighter left her forward leg exposed inviting Fujii for an attack on it. Fujii went for Murray's legs and won via submission.

She faced Cody Welchin at NFF – The Breakout on March 10, 2007. She won the fight by armbar submission in the first round.

On August 24, 2007, Fujii defeated highly touted American Lisa Ellis by first-round submission at a BodogFight event in Vancouver, British Columbia.

Fujii defeated Cindy Hales and Korean star Seo Hee Ham to advance to the finals of the 2008 Smackgirl World ReMix Grand Prix, but the promotion folded amidst financial troubles before the final round.

In November 2008, the newly rebranded Smackgirl, now known as Jewels, featured Fujii at its debut "First Ring" event. Fujii defeated Tomoko Morii by submission in the first round.

After submitting Won Bun Chu in less than one minute at Shooto: "Tradition Final" in May 2009, Fujii returned to Jewels and defeated rising Japanese contender Saori Ishioka late in the second round.

She defeated veteran striker "Windy" Tomomi Sunaba by first-round armbar at Shooto: "Revolutionary Exchanges 3" on November 23, 2009.

On May 6, 2010, it was announced that Fujii would compete at Bellator 22 on June 10. Bellator later changed the numbering of their events and the June 10 card was renamed Bellator 21. Fujii faced Sarah Schneider and defeated Schneider by TKO in the third round. It marked Fujii's first victory by TKO in her 20-fight career.

Fujii took part in the Bellator 115-pound women's tournament in Season Three, which began on August 12, 2010. She was set to face Angela Magaña in the first round of the tournament at Bellator 24, but Magana withdrew from the tournament on August 8, 2010 after suffering a foot injury.

Fujii instead faced two-time All-American wrestler Carla Esparza. She defeated Esparza by armbar submission in the second round.

Fujii once again faced Lisa Ellis in the second round of the Bellator tournament at Bellator 31 and won the rematch by armbar submission in the first round.

With the victory, Fujii became only the second mixed martial artist, male or female, to begin a career with 22 consecutive victories. She faced Zoila Gurgel in the finals of the tournament at Bellator 34 on October 28, 2010. Fujii lost the fight via a questionable split decision.

Fujii faced Emi Fujino at World Victory Road Presents: Soul of Fight on December 30, 2010 and defeated Fujino by unanimous decision.

Fujii rematched Mika Nagano at Jewels 15th Ring on July 9, 2011. She defeated Nagano by unanimous decision.

Fujii faced Karla Benitez at DREAM – Fight For Japan: Genki Desu Ka Omisoka 2011 on December 31, 2011. She defeated Benitez by submission due to an armbar in the first round.

Fujii returned to Bellator to face Jessica Aguilar at Bellator 69 on May 18, 2012. She was defeated by unanimous decision.

Fujii was rumored to be competing at DREAM 18 on New Year's Eve 2012. However, she instead faced Mei Yamaguchi at Vale Tudo Japan 2012 on December 24. Fujii defeated Yamaguchi by unanimous decision.

On June 22, 2013, Fujii announced that she would retire from MMA after competing one final time. In her retirement bout, she faced Jessica Aguilar in a rematch at Vale Tudo Japan 3rd on October 5 in Tokyo. Fujii was initially defeated by TKO when the doctor stopped the fight after round two due to an eye injury that was caused by two accidental eye pokes. The result of the fight was later changed to a technical majority decision win for Aguilar.

== Personal life ==
Fujii is married to mixed martial artist Shinji Sasaki, and they have a child.

== Mixed martial arts record ==
Professional record breakdown
29 matches	26 wins	3 losses
By knockout	1	0
By submission	19	0
By decision	6	3

Res.	Record	Opponent	Method	Event	Date	Round	Time	Location	Notes
Loss	26–3	Jessica Aguilar	Technical Decision (eye pokes)	Vale Tudo Japan 3rd	October 5, 2013	2	5:00	Tokyo, Japan	
Win	26–2	Mei Yamaguchi	Decision (unanimous)	Vale Tudo Japan 2012	December 24, 2012	2	5:00	Tokyo, Japan	
Loss	25–2	Jessica Aguilar	Decision (unanimous)	Bellator 69	May 18, 2012	3	5:00	Lake Charles, Louisiana, United States	
Win	25–1	Karla Benitez	Submission (armbar)	Fight For Japan: Genki Desu Ka Omisoka 2011	December 31, 2011	1	1:15	Saitama, Saitama, Japan	
Win	24–1	Mika Nagano	Decision (unanimous)	Jewels 15th Ring	July 9, 2011	2	5:00	Tokyo, Japan	
Win	23–1	Emi Fujino	Decision (unanimous)	World Victory Road Presents: Soul of Fight	December 30, 2010	3	5:00	Tokyo, Japan	
Loss	22–1	Zoila Frausto Gurgel	Decision (split)	Bellator 34	October 28, 2010	5	5:00	Hollywood, Florida, United States	Bellator Season 3 Women's 115 lb Tournament Final; For the inaugural Bellator Women's Strawweight World Championship.
Win	22–0	Lisa Ellis	Submission (armbar)	Bellator 31	September 30, 2010	1	1:39	Lake Charles, Louisiana, United States	Bellator Season 3 Women's 115 lb Tournament Semifinal
Win	21–0	Carla Esparza	Submission (armbar)	Bellator 24	August 12, 2010	2	0:57	Hollywood, Florida, United States	Bellator Season 3 Women's 115 lb Tournament Quarterfinal
Win	20–0	Sarah Schneider	TKO (punches)	Bellator 21	June 10, 2010	3	1:58	Hollywood, Florida, United States	
Win	19–0	Tomomi Sunaba	Submission (armbar)	Shooto: Revolutionary Exchanges 3	November 23, 2009	1	3:24	Tokyo, Japan	
Win	18–0	Saori Ishioka	Submission (armbar)	Jewels 4th Ring	July 11, 2009	2	4:17	Tokyo, Japan	
Win	17–0	Won Bun Chu	Submission (keylock)	Shooto: Shooto Tradition Final	May 10, 2009	1	0:52	Tokyo, Japan	
Win	16–0	Tomoko Morii	Submission (armbar)	Jewels 1st Ring	November 16, 2008	1	1:05	Tokyo, Japan	
Win	15–0	Seo Hee Ham	Submission (armbar)	Smackgirl: World ReMix 2008 Second Round	April 26, 2008	1	3:39	Tokyo, Japan	Smackgirl World ReMix 2008 Grand Prix Semifinal
Win	14–0	Cindy Hales	Submission (armbar)	Smackgirl: World ReMix 2008 Opening Round	February 14, 2008	2	0:27	Tokyo, Japan	Smackgirl World ReMix 2008 Grand Prix Quarterfinal
Win	13–0	Mika Nagano	Submission (triangle choke)	Smackgirl: Starting Over	December 26, 2007	1	1:20	Tokyo, Japan	
Win	12–0	Kyoko Takabayashi	Decision (unanimous)	Shooto: Back To Our Roots 6	November 8, 2007	2	5:00	Tokyo, Japan	
Win	11–0	Lisa Ellis	Submission (armbar)	BodogFight: Vancouver	August 24, 2007	1	4:50	Vancouver, British Columbia, Canada	
Win	10–0	Cody Welchlin	Submission (armbar)	NFF: The Breakout	March 10, 2007	1	2:40	Minneapolis, Minnesota, United States	
Win	9–0	Masako Yoshida	Submission (heel hook)	Shooto: Battle Mix Tokyo 1	January 26, 2007	1	0:51	Tokyo, Japan	
Win	8–0	Serin Murray	Submission (toe hold)	Smackgirl: Legend of Extreme Women	November 29, 2006	1	0:20	Tokyo, Japan	
Win	7–0	Keiko Tamai	Submission (armbar)	Smackgirl: Top Girl Battle	June 30, 2006	1	0:53	Tokyo, Japan	
Win	6–0	Misaki Takimoto	Technical Submission (armbar)	Shooto: The Victory of the Truth	February 17, 2006	2	4:36	Tokyo, Japan	
Win	5–0	Dah Le Chon	Submission (rear-naked choke)	G-Shooto: G-Shooto 03	December 17, 2005	1	0:19	Tokyo, Japan	
Win	4–0	Ana Michelle Tavares	Decision (unanimous)	G-Shooto: G-Shooto 02	March 12, 2005	2	5:00	Tokyo, Japan	
Win	3–0	Nadia van der Wel	Submission (armbar)	Shooto: Year End Show 2004	December 14, 2004	1	1:43	Tokyo, Japan	
Win	2–0	Erica Montoya	Decision (unanimous)	HOOKnSHOOT: Evolution	November 6, 2004	3	5:00	Evansville, Indiana, United States	
Win	1–0	Yumi Matsumoto	Submission (rear-naked choke)	Smackgirl: Holy Land Triumphal Return	August 5, 2004	1	0:40	Tokyo, Japan	

== See also ==
- List of female mixed martial artists
