= Serin Murray =

Australian martial artist

- Born: 1981 (age 44–45); Newcastle, NSW, Australia
- Nationality: Australian
- Height: 5 ft 6 in (1.68 m)
- Weight: 119 lb (54 kg; 8.5 st)
- Division: Flyweight
- Style: Muay Thai
- Fighting out of: Newcastle, NSW, Australia

Other information
- Mixed martial arts record from Sherdog

Serin Murray (born 1981) is an Australian mixed martial artist. She is the current ISKA World Oriental Rules Super Flyweight champion.

== Career ==
Murray's MMA debut was in 2006 in Tokyo's Korakuen Hall against Megumi Fujii, who is one of the best women MMA fighters in the world. Murray was the first Australian woman in the Smackgirl event, but Fujii forced her submission in the first round with an ankle lock. Murray now specializes mainly in Muay Thai.

On 4 July 2009, she won the ISKA flyweight Muay Thai world title against Japan's Noriko Tsunoda.

== Mixed martial arts record ==
| Res. | Record | Opponent | Method | Event | Date | Round | Time | Location | Notes |
|---|---|---|---|---|---|---|---|---|---|
| Loss | 0-1 | (Japan) Megumi Fujii | Submission (ankle lock) | Smackgirl: Legend of Extreme Women | 29 November 2006 | 1 | 0:20 | KORAKUEN HALL TOKYO, JAPAN | |

== See also ==
- List of female mixed martial artists
