= Jewels 3rd Ring =

Mixed martial arts event in 2009

- The poster for Jewels 3rd Ring
- Promotion: Jewels
- Date: May 16, 2009
- Venue: Shinjuku Face
- City: Kabukicho, Tokyo, Japan
- Attendance: 734

Event chronology
| Jewels 2nd Ring | Jewels 3rd Ring | Jewels 4th Ring |

Jewels 3rd Ring, was a mixed martial arts (MMA) event held by promotion Jewels. The event took place on May 16, 2009 at Shinjuku Face in Kabukicho, Tokyo, Japan.

== Background ==
The event was first announced in February 2009 and the first part of the card was revealed in April 2009, with Hiroko Yamanaka as the main event and two shoot boxing matches with Misato Tomita and Saori Ishioka. Most of the rest of the card was revealed by the end of that month and the order of the bouts was announced shortly before the event.

== Results ==
Main Card
| Weight class | | | | Method | Round | Time | Notes |
|---|---|---|---|---|---|---|---|
| Openweight | Hiroko Yamanaka | def. | Shannon Hooper | Decision (Unanimous) | 2 | 5:00 | (Note: In the first round, Hooper tried to close the distance to land punching combinations but Yamanaka used her reach advantage and leg kicks to keep Hooper away. Using jabs, kicks and occasional knees while in the Thai clinch, Yamanaka controlled the first round, damaging Hopper's legs. In the second, Yamanaka continued to use the same tactics, winning a unanimous decision.) |
| -48 kg | Misaki Takimoto | def. | Yukiko Seki | Submission (Armbar) | 1 | 3:40 | (Note: Seki took the initiative landing some punches at the beginning, but Takimoto kept her distance and while in the clinch dropped Seki with knees. Takimoto then tried to get a rear naked choke, which Seki defended, and Takimoto transitioned into an armbar and forced Seki to submit.) |
| -58 kg | Shizuka Sugiyama | def. | Celine Haga | Decision (Unanimous) | 2 | 5:00 | (Note: Using kicks, punches and ground control, Sugiyama dominated Haga, with Haga only trying occasional haymakers and trying ineffectively to take the fight to the ground during the first round. During the second round, Sugiyama continued to dominate the fight, receiving a yellow card for accidentally striking Haga's head on the ground, an action forbidden in Jewels, but winning a unanimous decision.) |
| -54 kg | Mika Nagano | def. | Misaki Ozawa | Technical Submission (Armbar) | 1 | 2:09 | (Note: The fight started with a takedown by Nagano. Ozawa defended well while on the ground and the referee stood both fighters up. Ozawa went for a takedown, but Nagano reversed it and got an armbar, which prompted the referee to stop the fight.) |
| Openweight | Chihiro Oikawa | def. | Harumi Harumi | Submission (Armbar) | 1 | 2:22 | (Note: Oikawa started striking Harumi aggressively and went to clinch trying to throw Harumi to the mat, but Harumi defended until Oikawa started changed tactics and started punching Harumi from the close distance. Harumi fell and Oikawa got the armbar.) |
| -57 kg | Yuko Oya | def. | Hanako Kobayashi | Decision (Unanimous) | 2 | 5:00 | (Note: Both fighters traded punches during the first round, until Oya went for takedowns. In the second round, Oya kept taking the fight to the ground and the rhythm slowed down eventually, with Oya taking the unanimous decision.) |
| -60 kg | Miki Morifuji | def. | Mayu Yamagishi | KO (Punches) | 1 | 0:16 | (Note: Morifuji launched a series of punches which weren't defended by Mayu, knocking her down and rendering her unable to get up.) |
| -54 kg | Hiroko Kitamura | def. | Emi Murata | Submission (Armbar) | 1 | 2:31 |
| -52 kg | Miyoko Kusaka | def. | Yoko Kagoshima | Submission (Rear-Naked Choke) | 1 | 2:50 |
Shoot Boxing Rules
| -53.5 kg | Kozue Nagashima | def. | Misato Tomita | decision (1-2) |
| -53.5 kg | Saori Ishioka | def. | Kanako Oka | decision (3-0) |

== See also ==
- Jewels (mixed martial arts)
- 2009 in Jewels
