= Shizuka Sugiyama =

Japanese mixed martial artist

- Born: February 11, 1987 (age 39); New York City, New York, United States
- Other names: Shiiyan
- Nationality: Japanese
- Height: 1.65 m (5 ft 5 in)
- Weight: 57 kg (126 lb)
- Division: Flyweight; Bantamweight
- Style: Zendokai Karate, Brazilian Jiu-Jitsu
- Fighting out of: Yokohama, Kanagawa Prefecture, Japan
- Team: Zendokai Yokohama
- Rank: Black Belt in Zendokai Karate; Black Belt in Judo; Blue Belt in Brazilian Jiu-Jitsu
- Years active: 2008-present

Mixed martial arts record
- Total: 34
- Wins: 25
- By knockout: 6
- By submission: 6
- By decision: 13
- Losses: 8
- By knockout: 4
- By submission: 1
- By decision: 3
- Draws: 1

Other information
- Website: Official blog
- Mixed martial arts record from Sherdog
- Last updated on: December 1, 2013

Shizuka Sugiyama (杉山 しずか, sugiyama shizuka), occasionally nicknamed Shiiyan (しぃやん) is an American-born Japanese female mixed martial artist. She previously fought in the MMA promotion Jewels and now competes for Deep.

== Background ==
Sugiyama was born on February 11, 1987 in New York City, New York, United States. Sugiyama has an older brother.

She graduated from the sports faculty of the Tokai University. While in the Tokai University, she was first introduced to the Karate-Do Zendokai association and began studying karate at 18 years old. She got her black belt in Karate in 2009.

Sugiyama participated in the Japan Open 2007 Vale Tudo Real Fighting Karate-do Championship Series, placing second in the general category for women, being defeated by Saori Ishioka. In 2008, she was the winner of the Japan Open 2008 Vale Tudo Real Fighting Karate-do Championship Series 57 kg. She would repeat this feat in 2009.

Shortly before her professional debut in MMA, she had a grappling match and was defeated by Hitomi Sakamoto.

== Mixed martial arts career ==
=== JEWELS ===
She debuted on November 16, 2008 at Jewels 1st Ring, defeating Harumi with a rear naked choke submission. She would win her next fight against Shiho by TKO on February 4, 2009. At Jewels 3rd Ring on May 16, 2009, Sugiyama defeated Norwegian fighter Celine Haga by unanimous decision. In another dominant performance, Sugiyama defeated Mika Harigai by unanimous decision on July 11, 2009.

Making her debut with the Shoot boxing promotion, Sugiyama once again faced Hitomi Sakamoto, who had defeated Sugiyama in a grappling match. This time, Sugiyama defeated Sakamoto by decision. Sugiyama's first loss came against German fighter Alexandra Sanchez in the opening round of the 2009 Jewels Rough Stone Grand Prix 60 kg on September 13, 2009.

Sugiyama rebounded back with a unanimous decision victory over Yukiko Ozeki at Jewels 6th Ring on December 11, 2009. At Jewels 7th Ring on March 19, 2010, Miki Morifuji defeated Sugiyama by unanimous decision.

Sugiyama was announced for Jewels 9th Ring in a shoot boxing match against Mongolian Esui, but she suffered a broken collar bone and a dislocated shoulder during training, which forced her to withdraw from the event.

Returning after her injury, Sugiyama faced Esui in a MMA bout at Jewels 11th Ring on December 17, 2010. Esui defeated Sugiyama by TKO (corner stoppage) early in the second round.

Sugiyama was scheduled to face Mayumi "Super Benkei" Aoki at Jewels 12th Ring on March 11, 2011 in Tokyo, Japan, and planned to travel to Australia for one year to study after the fight. However, the event was cancelled after the Tōhoku earthquake and tsunami earlier in the day.

Sugiyama returned to Jewels to face Megumi Yabushita at Jewels 20th Ring on July 21, 2012. She defeated Yabushita by split decision.

Sugiyama faced Yurika Tanaka at Jewels 21st Ring on September 22, 2012. She defeated Tanaka by TKO in the second round.

Sugiyama was set to face Roxanne Modafferi at Jewels 22nd Ring on December 15, 2012. However, Modafferi suffered a neck injury in training and withdrew from the fight on December 13.

Sugiyama next faced Sung Eun Kim at Jewels 23rd Ring on March 30, 2013. She won the fight by TKO in the first round.

=== DEEP JEWELS ===
On July 20, 2013, Sugiyama made her Deep debut against Chisa Yonezawa at Deep: Tokyo Impact - Lightweight GP 2013 Semifinal. She defeated Yonezawa by TKO in the first round.

Sugiyama next faced Ji Yeon Kim at Deep: Cage Impact 2013 on November 24, 2013. The fight ended in a majority draw after two rounds.

In her third appearance with DEEP, Sugiyama was scheduled to fight Mizuho Sato at Deep-Jewels 3. She beat Sato by a first-round TKO, after the ringside doctor was forced to stop the bout.

Sugiyama was scheduled to fight Takayo Hashi at Deep-Jewels 4 for the inaugural middleweight title. Hashi won the fight by TKO, near the end of the third round.

Sugiyama was scheduled to fight Yurika Nakakura at Deep Jewels 6. She won the fight by unanimous decision.

At Deep - Dream Impact 2014: Omisoka Special, Sugiyama was scheduled to fight the multiple-time World Boxing Council title challenger Emiko Raika in the latter's sophomore MMA appearance. Sugiyama won the fight by technical submission, forcing her opponent's corner to throw in the towel, as Raika refused to tap.

Sugiyama was next scheduled to fight Yukinari Nabekawa at Deep-Jewels 15. She won the fight by split decision.

Sugiyama extended her winning streak to four, after beating Satsuki Kodama by an armbar at Deep Jewels 17.

Shizuka was scheduled to make her RIZIN debut at the Rizin World Grand Prix 2017: 2nd Round event, being scheduled to fight Kana Watanabe. Watanabe won the fight by a unanimous decision.

Returning to DEEP, Sugiyama was scheduled to fight Sachiko Fujimori at Deep Jewels 20. Sugiyama won the fight by unanimous decision.

Sugiyama was scheduled to fight a rematch with Kana Watanabe Rizin - Heisei's Last Yarennoka!. Watanabe convincingly won the rematch, knocking Sugiyama out after just eleven seconds.

In her first fight outside of Japan, Sugiyama was scheduled to fight Chan-Mi Jeon at Double G FC 02. She won the fight by unanimous decision.

Sugiyama once again returned to DEEP, as she was scheduled to fight Asami Nakai at Deep Jewels 25. Sugiyama won the fight by an armbar.

Sugiyama was scheduled to fight Kano Kagaya at Deep-Jewels 29, in Kagaya's sophomore MMA appearance. Kagaya later withdrew due to COVID-19 and was replaced by Mika Arai. She won the fight by a technical submission, due to an armbar.

Sugiyama was scheduled to fight at DEEP's 20th anniversary event, against Aoi Kuriyama. Sugiyama won by a first-round TKO.

==== Deep-Jewels Flyweight Grand Prix ====
Sugiyama faced Mikiko Shimizu in the Deep-Jewels Flyweight Grand Prix quarterfinal bout at Deep Jewels 36 on March 12, 2022. She won the bout via split decision.

On May 8, 2022, she was scheduled to face Aoi Kuriyama in the DEEP JEWELS Flyweight Grand Prix semi-final held at Deep Jewels 37. However, Kuriyama missed weight, resulting in Sugiyama receiving a bye to the final. In the final on the same day, she faced Rin Nakai, losing via armbar at the end of the first round.

=== PANCRASE ===
Sugiyama made her PANCRASE debut against Emiko Raika at PANCRASE 341 on March 31, 2024. She won the fight by unanimous decision.

On July 21, 2024, she faced the champion Honoka Shigeta in the women's flyweight title match at PANCRASE 346 and won by submission in the first round with a ninja choke. She became the fourth Queen of Pancrase in the flyweight division.

On May 31, 2026, she announced her retirement from the sport.

== Outside mixed martial arts ==
Sugiyama posed for a photobook published by Kamipro and has also appeared in an Internet TV show called Stickam TV.

== Mixed martial arts record ==
Professional record breakdown
| 34 matches | 25 wins | 8 losses |
| By knockout | 6 | 4 |
| By submission | 6 | 1 |
| By decision | 13 | 3 |
| Draws | 1 | |

| Res. | Record | Opponent | Method | Event | Date | Round | Time | Location | Notes |
|---|---|---|---|---|---|---|---|---|---|
| Win | 25–8–1 | Emi Fujino | Decision (unanimous) | Pancrase 366 | September 23, 2026 | 3 | 5:00 | Tachikawa, Japan | Catchweight (119 lb) bout. |
| Win | 24–8–1 | Ayane Wada | Decision (unanimous) | Pancrase 361 | March 14, 2026 | 5 | 5:00 | Yokohama, Japan | Won the vacant Pancrase Women's Flyweight Championship. |
| Loss | 23–8–1 | Fumika Watanabe | KO (punch) | Pancrase 352 | March 8, 2025 | 1 | 2:15 | Yokohama, Japan | Lost the Pancrase Women's Flyweight Championship. |
| Win | 23–7–1 | Honoka Shigeta | Technical Submission (ninja choke) | Pancrase 346 | July 21, 2024 | 1 | 2:40 | Tokyo, Japan | Won the Pancrase Women's Flyweight Championship. |
| Win | 22–7–1 | Emiko Raika | Decision (unanimous) | Pancrase 341 | March 31, 2024 | 3 | 5:00 | Tokyo, Japan | |
| Loss | 21–7–1 | Rin Nakai | Technical Submission (armbar) | Deep Jewels 37 | May 8, 2022 | 1 | 4:53 | Tokyo, Japan | Deep Jewels Flyweight Grand Prix Final. For the inaugural Jewels Flyweight Championship. |
| Win | 21–6–1 | Mikiko Shimizu | Decision (split) | Deep Jewels 36 | March 12, 2022 | 2 | 5:00 | Tokyo, Japan | Deep Jewels Flyweight Grand Prix Quarterfinal. |
| Win | 20–6–1 | Aoi Kuriyama | TKO (punches) | DEEP 100 Impact | February 21, 2021 | 1 | 2:40 | Tokyo, Japan | |
| Win | 19–6–1 | Mika Arai | Technical Submission (armbar) | Deep Jewels 29 | July 23, 2020 | 3 | 1:49 | Tokyo, Japan | Bantamweight bout. |
| Win | 18–6–1 | Asami Nakai | Submission (armbar) | Deep Jewels 25 | September 1, 2019 | 2 | 4:04 | Tokyo, Japan | |
| Win | 17–6–1 | Jeon Chan-mi | Decision (unanimous) | Double G FC 2 | March 30, 2019 | 3 | 5:00 | Seoul, South Korea | |
| Loss | 16–6–1 | Kana Watanabe | TKO (punch) | Rizin: Heisei's Last Yarennoka! | December 31, 2018 | 1 | 0:11 | Saitama, Japan | |
| Win | 16–5–1 | Sachiko Fujimori | Decision (unanimous) | Deep Jewels 20 | August 26, 2017 | 3 | 5:00 | Tokyo, Japan | |
| Loss | 15–5–1 | Kana Watanabe | Decision (unanimous) | Rizin World Grand Prix 2017: 2nd Round | December 29, 2017 | 3 | 5:00 | Saitama, Japan | |
| Win | 15–4–1 | Satsuki Kodama | Technical Submission (armbar) | Deep Jewels 17 | August 26, 2017 | 1 | 4:53 | Tokyo, Japan | Return to Flyweight. |
| Win | 14–4–1 | Yukinari Nabekawa | Decision (split) | Deep Jewels 15 | February 25, 2017 | 2 | 5:00 | Tokyo, Japan | Catchweight (130 lb) bout. |
| Win | 13–4–1 | Emiko Raika | Technical Submission (armbar) | DEEP Dream Impact 2014: Omisoka Special | December 31, 2014 | 1 | 4:06 | Saitama, Japan | Catchweight (130 lb) bout. |
| Win | 12–4–1 | Yurika Nakakura | Decision (unanimous) | Deep Jewels 6 | November 3, 2014 | 2 | 5:00 | Tokyo, Japan | |
| Loss | 11–4–1 | Takayo Hashi | TKO (punches) | Deep Jewels 4 | February 16, 2014 | 3 | 4:20 | Tokyo, Japan | For the inaugural Jewels Bantamweight Championship. |
| Win | 11–3–1 | Mizuho Sato | TKO (doctor stoppage) | Deep Jewels 3 | February 16, 2014 | 1 | 1:15 | Tokyo, Japan | |
| Draw | 10–3–1 | Kim Ji-yeon | Draw (majority) | Deep: Cage Impact 2013 | November 24, 2013 | 2 | 5:00 | Tokyo, Japan | |
| Win | 10–3 | Chisa Yonezawa | TKO (punches) | DEEP Tokyo Impact: Lightweight GP 2013 Semifinal | July 20, 2013 | 1 | 1:16 | Tokyo, Japan | |
| Win | 9–3 | Kim Sung-eun | TKO (punches) | Jewels 23rd Ring | March 30, 2013 | 1 | 1:01 | Tokyo, Japan | Catchweight (132 lb) bout. |
| Win | 8–3 | Yurika Tanaka | TKO (punches) | Jewels 21st Ring | September 22, 2012 | 2 | 1:24 | Tokyo, Japan | Bantamweight debut. |
| Win | 7–3 | Megumi Yabushita | Decision (split) | Jewels 20th Ring | July 21, 2012 | 2 | 5:00 | Tokyo, Japan | Catchweight (137 lb) bout. |
| Loss | 6–3 | Erdenebilegiin Bolormaa | TKO (corner stoppage) | Jewels 11th Ring | December 17, 2010 | 2 | 0:13 | Tokyo, Japan | Catchweight (130 lb) bout. |
| Loss | 6–2 | Miki Morifuji | Decision (unanimous) | Jewels 7th Ring | March 19, 2010 | 2 | 5:00 | Tokyo, Japan | Catchweight (128 lb) bout. |
| Win | 6–1 | Yukiko Ozeki | Decision (unanimous) | Jewels 6th Ring | December 11, 2009 | 2 | 5:00 | Tokyo, Japan | Catchweight (132 lb) bout. |
| Loss | 5–1 | Alexandra Sanchez | Decision (unanimous) | Jewels 5th Ring | September 13, 2009 | 2 | 5:00 | Tokyo, Japan | Jewels Rough Stone Grand Prix -60kg Opening Round. |
| Win | 5–0 | Hitomi Sakamoto | Decision (unanimous) | Shoot Boxing Girls Tournament 2009 | August 23, 2009 | 2 | 5:00 | Tokyo, Japan | Flyweight debut. |
| Win | 4–0 | Mika Harigai | Decision (unanimous) | Jewels 4th Ring | July 11, 2009 | 2 | 5:00 | Tokyo, Japan | Catchweight (141 lb) bout. |
| Win | 3–0 | Celine Haga | Decision (unanimous) | Jewels 3rd Ring | May 16, 2009 | 2 | 5:00 | Tokyo, Japan | Catchweight (128 lb) bout. |
| Win | 2–0 | Shiho | TKO (knees to the body and punches) | Jewels 2nd Ring | February 4, 2009 | 1 | 2:55 | Tokyo, Japan | Catchweight (132 lb) bout. |
| Win | 1–0 | Harumi | Submission (rear-naked choke) | Jewels 1st Ring | November 16, 2008 | 1 | 2:55 | Tokyo, Japan | Catchweight (132 lb) bout. |

== Submission grappling ==
1 Fight, 0 Wins, 1 Loss, 0 Draws
| Result | Record | Opponent | Method | Event | Date | Round | Time | Location | Notes |
|---|---|---|---|---|---|---|---|---|---|
| Loss | 0-1-0 | (Japan) Hitomi Sakamoto | Points 2-2, advantage 0-2 | Gi grappling 2008 | August 31, 2008 | 1 | 1:24 | Tokyo, Japan | Queen tournament beginner -58 kg semi-finals |

Legend: Win Loss Draw/No contest

== Championships and accomplishments ==
- Japan Open 2007 Vale Tudo Real Fighting Karate-do Championship Series general category women runner-up
- Japan Open 2008 Vale Tudo Real Fighting Karate-do Championship Series 57 kg winner
- Japan Open 2009 Vale Tudo Real Fighting Karate-do Championship Series 57 kg winner

== See also ==
- List of female mixed martial artists
