= Mika Nagano =

Japanese MMA fighter and professional wrestler

- Born: December 29, 1983 (age 42); Gifu, Gifu, Japan
- Other names: Future Princess
- Nationality: Japanese
- Height: 5 ft 3 in (1.60 m)
- Weight: 114 lb (52 kg; 8.1 st)
- Division: Lightweight (49 kg – 54 kg) (Deep)
- Style: Wrestling
- Fighting out of: Japan
- Team: Core
- Years active: 2007–present

Mixed martial arts record
- Total: 32
- Wins: 18
- By submission: 15
- By decision: 3
- Losses: 13
- By knockout: 1
- By submission: 1
- By decision: 11
- Draws: 1

Other information
- Website: Official blog
- Mixed martial arts record from Sherdog
- Last updated on: November 11, 2013

Mika Nagano (長野 美香, Nagano Mika; born December 29, 1983) is a Japanese female mixed martial artist and professional wrestler. She fought as a lightweight in the Deep and Jewels promotions before her retirement in 2014. Nagano has also wrestled in Ice Ribbon and World Wonder Ring Stardom. Her nickname is Future Princess.

Nagano won the 2009 Jewels Rough Stone Grand Prix at 54 kg.

== Early life ==
Nagano was born on December 29, 1983 in Gifu, Gifu, Japan. She started wrestling in the fourth grade of elementary school and continued wrestling in middle school and high school, becoming second place in all of Japan at the high school level.

While studying at Chukyo Women's University, she was an amateur wrestling champion and finished fourth in the 55 kg division of the 2002 Japan Queen's Cup; the same tournament where future Olympic medalist Saori Yoshida finished first.

In 2004, she was ranked fourth in the 51 kg class, but left the university after three years before graduating and stopping wrestling.

Nagano moved to Tokyo in 2005, where she joined a modeling agency of independent wrestling and started talent activities. She was eventually charmed by MMA when she visited S-KEEP.

== Mixed martial arts career ==
Nagano debuted in MMA in an exhibition match against Megumi Yabushita at Smackgirl: F 2006 on May 3, 2006. She made her professional debut against Megumi Fujii and lost via submission (triangle choke) at Smackgirl: Starting Over at Korakuen Hall on December 26, 2007.

After winning her next fight by split decision and losing her third by decision, she went on to win her following three fights by submission (armbar). In the process, she won the 2009 Rough Stone Grand Prix 54 kg & under tournament after defeating Yoko Kagoshima in the tournament final.

Following a unanimous decision win and going on a five-fight winning streak (defeating Rina Tomita twice), Nagano was upset at Jewels 8th Ring on May 23, 2010 by Norwegian fighter Celine Haga, who was an underdog after losing her first four professional fights. Haga dominated the whole fight, earning a unanimous decision win. The loss was so devastating that Nagano was in tears even before the fight ended.

Nagano managed to avenge this loss in the Jewels Lightweight (115 lb) Queen Tournament Opening Round by defeating Haga with an armbar submission at Jewels 9th Ring on July 31, 2010. She faced Seo Hee Ham in the tournament semi-finals on December 17, 2010 at Jewels 11th Ring and was defeated by split decision after two rounds.

Nagano was scheduled to face Emi Murata at Jewels 12th Ring on March 11, 2011 in Tokyo, Japan, but the event was cancelled after the Tōhoku earthquake and tsunami earlier in the day.

She then faced Murata at Jewels 14th Ring on May 14, 2011 and defeated Murata by submission in the first round.

Nagano rematched Megumi Fujii at Jewels 15th Ring on July 9, 2011. She was defeated by unanimous decision.

Nagano faced Mei Yamaguchi at Jewels 17th Ring on December 17, 2011. She was defeated by split decision.

Nagano then faced Emi Fujino at Jewels 18th Ring on March 3, 2012. She lost the fight by unanimous decision.

On May 26, 2012, Nagano faced Anna Saito at Jewels 19th Ring in Osaka, Japan. She won the fight by submission due to an armbar in the first round.

Nagano's next fight took place on September 22, 2012 when she faced Tomo Maesawa at Jewels 21st Ring. She defeated Maesawa by technical submission due to an armbar in the second round.

On October 27, 2012, Nagano competed outside Japan for the first time when she faced Alexandra Chambers at Brace For War 17 in Australia. She was defeated by TKO early in the first round.

Nagano faced Rina Tomita for a third time at Jewels 22nd Ring on December 15, 2012. The fight was Tomita's retirement match. Nagano defeated Tomita by submission due to an armbar in the first round.

Nagano next faced Emi Tomimatsu at Jewels 23rd Ring on March 30, 2013. She won the fight by unanimous decision.

On May 25, 2013, Nagano faced Takumi Umehara at Jewels 24th Ring. She defeated Umehara by submission due to a rear-naked choke in the first round.

Nagano next faced Akiko Naito in Naito's retirement fight at Deep Jewels 1 on August 31, 2013. She defeated Naito by submission due to an armbar in the first round.

In a rematch at Deep Jewels 2 on November 4, 2013, Nagano faced Emi Tomimatsu in the opening round of the Deep Jewels lightweight title tournament. She was defeated by unanimous decision. On December 28, 2013, Nagano announced that she was retiring from MMA the following February. However, on February 6, Nagano announced she was pregnant and would have to pull out of her exhibition match with Saori Ishioka. Nagano's retirement ceremony took place on February 16 at Deep Jewels 3.

== Professional wrestling career ==
Nagano made her professional wrestling debut on August 23, 2009 with wrestling promotion Ice Ribbon. After competing in Ice Ribbon for a few months, it appeared that she was no longer with the promotion as of February 2010; apparently focusing more on her MMA career after being pushed as a top star in Jewels. In January 2011, Nagano returned to professional wrestling, competing for the new World Wonder Ring Stardom promotion. She worked the promotion's first ever show on January 23, 2011, during which she defeated Eri Susa. However, after only a handful of appearances, which included her losing to Yoko Bito in a World of Stardom Championship tournament semifinal match on July 24, 2011, Nagano once again went inactive to concentrate on her career with Jewels. On April 2, 2013, Stardom announced that Nagano would be returning to take part in the promotion's big Ryōgoku Kokugikan event on April 29. In her return match at Ryōgoku Cinderella, Nagano teamed with Nanae Takahashi and Tsukasa Fujimoto in a six-woman tag team match, where they defeated Hiroyo Matsumoto, Kaori Yoneyama and Syuri.

== Outside mixed martial arts ==
Nagano has posed in bikini and semi-nude photo shoots in Japanese magazine Friday.

== Personal life ==
Nagano was married in December 2013 and announced her pregnancy on February 6, 2014.

== Mixed martial arts record ==
Professional record breakdown
32 matches	18 wins	13 losses
By knockout	0	1
By submission	15	1
By decision	3	11
Draws	1	

Res.	Record	Opponent	Method	Event	Date	Round	Time	Location	Notes
Loss	18–13–1	Arisa Matsuda	Decision (unanimous)	Deep Jewels 39	November 23, 2022	2	5:00	Tokyo, Japan	
Win	18–12–1	Tomoko Inoue	Submission (armbar)	Deep Jewels 38	September 11, 2022	1	4:19	Tokyo, Japan	
Win	17–12–1	Kate Oyama	Submission (guillotine choke)	Deep Jewels 37	May 8, 2022	2	0:57	Tokyo, Japan	
Loss	16–12–1	Miki Motono	Decision (unanimous)	Deep Jewels 24	June 9, 2019	2	5:00	Tokyo, Japan	
Loss	16–11–1	Miyuu Yamamoto	Decision (unanimous)	Rizin 14	December 31, 2018	3	5:00	Saitama, Japan	
Draw	16–10–1	Tanja Hoffmann	Draw (majority)	Deep Jewels 22	December 1, 2018	2	5:00	Tokyo, Japan	
Win	16–10	Izumi Noguchi	Submission (armbar)	Deep Jewels 21	September 16, 2018	1	4:02	Tokyo, Japan	
Loss	15–10	Bayarmaa Munkhgerel	Decision (unanimous)	MGL-1 Fighting Champion	September 24, 2016	3	5:00	Ulaanbaatar, Mongolia	
Win	15–9	Sachiko Fujimori	Technical Submission (armbar)	Deep Jewels 13	August 27, 2016	3	2:34	Tokyo, Japan	
Loss	14–9	Emi Tomimatsu	Decision (unanimous)	Deep Jewels 2	November 4, 2013	2	5:00	Kabukicho, Tokyo, Japan	Deep Jewels lightweight GP semi-final
Win	14–8	Akiko Naito	Submission (armbar)	Deep Jewels 1	August 31, 2013	1	2:24	Kabukicho, Tokyo, Japan	
Win	13–8	Takumi Umehara	Submission (rear-naked choke)	Jewels 24th Ring	May 25, 2013	1	1:42	Kabukicho, Tokyo, Japan	
Win	12–8	Emi Tomimatsu	Decision (unanimous)	Jewels 23rd Ring	March 30, 2013	2	5:00	Koto, Tokyo, Japan	
Win	11–8	Rina Tomita	Submission (armbar)	Jewels 22nd Ring	December 15, 2012	1	2:12	Koto, Tokyo, Japan	
Loss	10–8	Alexandra Chambers	TKO (knee and punches)	Brace For War 17: Brace Girls	October 27, 2012	1	0:42	Southport, Queensland, Australia	
Win	10–7	Tomo Maesawa	Technical Submission (armbar)	Jewels 21st Ring	September 22, 2012	2	3:37	Koto, Tokyo, Japan	
Win	9–7	Anna Saito	Submission (armbar)	Jewels 19th Ring	May 26, 2012	1	1:50	Taisho-ku, Osaka, Japan	
Loss	8–7	Emi Fujino	Decision (unanimous)	Jewels 18th Ring	March 3, 2012	2	5:00	Koto, Tokyo, Japan	
Loss	8–6	Mei Yamaguchi	Decision (split)	Jewels 17th Ring	December 17, 2011	2	5:00	Kabukicho, Tokyo, Japan	
Loss	8–5	Megumi Fujii	Decision (unanimous)	Jewels 15th Ring	July 9, 2011	2	5:00	Kabukicho, Tokyo, Japan	
Win	8–4	Emi Murata	Submission (armbar)	Jewels 13th Ring & 14th Ring	May 14, 2011	1	1:40	Koto, Tokyo, Japan	
Loss	7–4	Seo Hee Ham	Decision (split)	Jewels 11th Ring	December 17, 2010	2	5:00	Bunkyo, Tokyo, Japan	Jewels Lightweight (115 lbs) Queen Tournament Second Round
Win	7–3	Celine Haga	Submission (armbar)	Jewels 9th Ring	July 31, 2010	1	2:52	Shinjuku, Tokyo, Japan	Jewels Lightweight (115 lbs) Queen Tournament Opening Round
Loss	6–3	Celine Haga	Decision (unanimous)	Jewels 8th Ring	May 23, 2010	2	5:00	Koto, Tokyo, Japan	
Win	6–2	Mai Ichii	Decision (unanimous)	Jewels 7th Ring	March 19, 2010	2	5:00	Shinjuku, Tokyo, Japan	
Win	5–2	Yoko Kagoshima	Submission (armbar)	Jewels 6th Ring	December 11, 2009	2	3:56	Shinjuku, Tokyo, Japan	2009 Rough Stone Grand Prix 54 kg final
Win	4–2	Rina Tomita	Technical Submission (armbar)	Jewels 5th Ring	September 13, 2009	1	2:25	Shinjuku, Tokyo, Japan	2009 Rough Stone Grand Prix 54 kg 1st round
Win	3–2	Rina Tomita	Submission (armbar)	Jewels 4th Ring	July 11, 2009	2	0:35	Koto, Tokyo, Japan	
Win	2–2	Misaki Ozawa	Submission (armbar)	Jewels 3rd Ring	May 16, 2009	1	2:09	Shinjuku, Tokyo, Japan	
Loss	1–2	Saori Ishioka	Decision (unanimous)	Jewels 1st Ring	November 16, 2008	2	5:00	Shinjuku, Tokyo, Japan	
Win	1–1	Asami Kodera	Decision (split)	Smackgirl: World ReMix 2008 Second Round	April 25, 2008	2	5:00	Bunkyo, Tokyo, Japan	
Loss	0–1	Megumi Fujii	Submission (triangle choke)	Smackgirl: Starting Over	December 26, 2007	1	1:20	Bunkyo, Tokyo, Japan	

== See also ==
- List of female mixed martial artists
