= Jewels 8th Ring =

Mixed martial arts event in 2010

- The poster for Jewels 8th Ring
- Promotion: Jewels
- Date: May 23, 2010
- Venue: Shin-Kiba 1st Ring
- City: Koto, Tokyo, Japan
- Attendance: 438

Event chronology
Jewels 7th Ring	Jewels 8th Ring	Jewels 9th Ring

Jewels 8th Ring was a mixed martial arts (MMA) event held by MMA promotion Jewels. The event took place on May 23, 2010 at Shin-Kiba 1st Ring in Koto, Tokyo, Japan.

== Background ==
On April 23, 2010, Hiroko Yamanaka, Atsuko Emoto, Saori Ishioka and Mai Ichii were announced for the card. Rumored a few days before, Mika Nagano was officially added to the card on May 3, 2010 along with three more bouts. Jewels added two shoot boxing matches to the card on May 13, 2010. A grappling match was added as the opening fight on May 18, 2010.

The full card and fight order was revealed on May 22, 2010, the same day the weigh-ins took place.

== Results ==
=== Opening fight ===
- Jewels grappling rules -53 kg bout, 4 min / 1 R

(Japan) Emi Murata (Abe Ani Combat Club) vs. (Japan) Akiko Takami (Pogona Club Gym)

Takami defeated Murata by submission (armbar) at 3:16 of round 1.

=== Main card ===
- 1st match: Jewels official rules -57 kg bout, 5 min / 2 R

(Japan) Yuko Oya (56.0 kg (123.5 lb), DEEP Official Gym Impact) vs. (Japan) Harumi (56.6 kg (125 lb), Blue Dog Gym)

Oya defeated Harumi by submission (armbar) at 3:45 of round 1.

After Oya took down Harumi, Harumi attempted two guillotine chokes, getting caught in the last one with an armbar that ended the fight.

- 2nd match: Shoot boxing official rules -63 kg bout, 2 min / 3 R (extension 1 R)

(Japan) Mayumi Aoki (60.4 kg (133 lb), Gamurannac) vs. (Japan) Yukiko Ozeki (62.7 kg (138 lb), Ryusei Juku)

Aoki defeated Ozeki by TKO (doctor stoppage) at 1:36 of round 2.

Ozeki was able to punch Aoki during the first round, but with little damage. Aoki, on the other hand, badly injured Ozeki during the second round, breaking Ozeki's nose and ending the fight.

- 3rd match: Jewels official rules -52 kg bout, 5 min / 2 R

(Japan) Yoko Kagoshima (51.9 kg (114 lb), Shinagawa CS) vs. (Japan) Miyo Yoshida (51.8 kg (114 lb), Mach Dojo)

Yoshida defeated Kagoshima by TKO (punches) at 3:30 of round 1.

Yoshida quickly hit Kagoshima with a right straight and continued to attack her with kicks and a knee. After being separated from a clinch, Yoshida connected a right uppercut which sent Kagoshima to the mat. After Kagoshima stood herself up, Yoshida overwhelmed her with punches, prompting the referee to stop the fight.

- 4th match: Jewels official rules -52 kg bout, 5 min / 2 R

(Japan) Mika Nagano (52.0 kg (114.6 lb), S-Keep/Core) vs. (Norway) Celine Haga (51.2 kg (113 lb), Hellboy Hansen MMA)

Haga defeated Nagano by decision (0-3).

During the whole fight, Haga outstruck Nagano, taking down Nagano on two occasions in the first round and continuing to dominate her in the second, winning the unanimous decision in a huge upset that put Nagano crouching on the mat in tears even before the decision was given.

- 5th match: Shoot boxing official rules -54 kg bout, 2 min / 3 R (extension 1 R)

(Japan) Ai Takahashi (53.9 kg (119 lb), Caesar Gym) vs. (Japan) Yukino Oishi (53.9 kg (119 lb), Oishi Gym)

Takahashi defeated Oishi by decision (3-0).

During the first round, Oshi kept guard, defending most of Takahashi attacks despite being connected with some punches. In the second round, Takahashi got a neck throw and kept the offensive. The third round had Takahashi once again dominating the offense and taking down Oishi to win the unanimous decision after a dominating match from Takahashi.

- 6th match: Jewels official rules open weight bout, 5 min / 2 R

Hiroko Yamanaka (Master Japan) vs. Atsuko Emoto (freelance)

Yamanaka defeated Emoto by decision (3-0).

Yamanaka controlled the fight with punches, knees and kicks and had little trouble defending from Emoto's submission attempts. Overwhelming Emoto with her striking ability until the final minute, Yamanaka was awarded the unanimous decision.

- 7th match, main event: Jewels official rules -52 kg bout, 5 min / 2 R

(Japan) Saori Ishioka (51.9 kg (114 lb), Zendokai Koganei) vs. (Japan) Mai Ichii (51.5 kg (114 lb), Ice Ribbon)

Ishioka defeated Ichii by submission (armbar) at 2:41 of round 2.

The fight started with both fighters exchanging punches, but Ishioka soon got the upper hand and caught Ichii in a Muay Thai clinch in which she kneed Ichii and got a takedown, punching Ichii's body while looking for a kimura and an armbar, but Ichii was able to resist until the end of round one. In the second round, Ishioka again took Ishii down and tried once again to submit Ichii, finally doing so with an armbar.
