= Hiroko Yamanaka =

Japanese mixed martial arts fighter

- Born: October 24, 1978 (age 47); Kisarazu, Chiba, Japan
- Other names: Hiroko; Cat's Eye; Incomplete Queen
- Nationality: Japanese
- Height: 5 ft 11 in (1.80 m)
- Weight: 143 lb (65 kg)
- Reach: 71 in (180 cm)
- Style: Muay Thai, Shootboxing, Submission Grappling
- Fighting out of: Kisarazu, Chiba, Japan
- Team: B CREW; Master Japan
- Trainer: Kuniyoshi Hironaka
- Years active: 2006-2013

Mixed martial arts record
- Total: 16
- Wins: 12
- By knockout: 2
- By submission: 2
- By decision: 8
- Losses: 3
- By submission: 1
- By decision: 2
- No contests: 1

Other information
- Website: Official blog
- Mixed martial arts record from Sherdog
- Last updated on: August 6, 2013

Hiroko Yamanaka (山中 裕子, Yamanaka Hiroko), more commonly known simply as Hiroko (styled in capitals) and nicknamed Incomplete Queen (未完の女王, mikan no joō) or Cat's Eye, is a retired Japanese female mixed martial arts (MMA) fighter. She fought for Invicta FC, Strikeforce and Jewels, and was the final Smackgirl Open Weight Champion. Yamanaka announced her retirement on August 6, 2013.

== Early life ==
Yamanaka was born on October 24, 1978 in Kisarazu, Chiba, Japan. Through a personal friend's suggestion, Yamanaka initially took on mixed martial arts for health and fitness purposes only. After time, she found the sport of MMA agreed with her physicality and became more involved, fighting her first official match in May 2006.

== Mixed martial arts career ==
Her first MMA fight was a draw against Mariko Fujimoto in a match with Smackgirl amateur rules on May 14, 2006 at S-Keep: Eggs Fight 4.

Her next fight was in the Super Gals Mix Cup Open Weight Tournament 1st Round against Rie Murakami, whom Yamanaka defeated by unanimous decision on November 29, 2006 at Smackgirl: Legend of Extreme Women. This was her professional debut.

Yamanaka would go on to win the Super Gals Mix Cup Open Weight Tournament by defeating Yuiga by unanimous decision on March 11, 2007 and Michiko Takeda by split decision on May 19, 2007.

On September 6, 2007 at Smackgirl: Queens' Hottest Summer, Yamanaka defeated champion Yoko Takahashi by unanimous decision and won the Smackgirl Open Weight Championship, becoming the fourth and final title holder. Yamanaka was defeated for the first time in a non-title bout as part of the Open Weight World ReMix tournament by Hitomi Akano, who submitted Yamanaka with an armbar on April 25, 2008 at Smackgirl: World ReMix 2008 Second Round. This was Yamanaka's last fight in Smackgirl since the promotion folded in the following months.

Yamanaka made her debut in the Jewels promotion on November 16, 2008, defeating Mayumi Aoki by unanimous decision at Jewels 1st Ring.

At Jewels 2nd Ring on February 4, 2009, Yamanaka once again faced Michiko Takeda and defeated her for the second time; this time by TKO at 3:25 of the second round. On May 16, 2009, Yamanaka defeated Josh Barnett's student Shannon Hooper by unanimous decision during the event Jewels 3rd Ring.

Yamanaka would avenge her only loss at Jewels 7th Ring when she defeated Hitomi Akano by split decision on March 19, 2010. Unlike their first open-weight match, this match was contracted at 143 lb (65 kg) and, for the first time in her career, Yamanaka had to cut weight; cutting more than 20 lbs. On May 23, 2010, Yamanaka defeated Atsuko Emoto by unanimous decision at Jewels 8th Ring. Emoto announced her retirement after the fight.

Debuting with the Shoot boxing promotion, Yamanaka won by forearm choke submission against Australian Muay Thai kickboxing champion Sandy Furner on August 29, 2010 in an MMA bout at Shoot Boxing: Girls S-Cup 2010. Yamanaka was originally set to face Olympic freestyle wrestling Bronze medal winner Randi Miller, but Miller was forced to withdraw due to injury.

On December 3, 2010, Yamanaka was announced as facing Miller at Jewels 11th Ring on December 17. However, the fight was later cancelled. Yamanaka faced Molly Helsel instead and defeated Helsel by TKO in the second round.

Yamanaka faced Bolormaa "Esui" Erdenebileg at Jewels 15th Ring on July 9, 2011. She defeated Esui by armbar submission in the second round.

On September 23, 2011, Strikeforce announced that Yamanaka would debut for the promotion against featherweight champion Cris Cyborg. The fight took place at Strikeforce: Melendez vs. Masvidal on December 17, 2011. Yamanaka lost the bout via TKO 16 seconds into the first round. On January 6, 2012, the bout's result was changed to a no decision due to Cyborg having tested positive for anabolic steroids.

Yamanaka faced Germaine de Randamie at Strikeforce: Rousey vs. Kaufman on August 18, 2012 in San Diego, California. She was defeated by unanimous decision.

Yamanaka made her Invicta Fighting Championships debut against Ediane Gomes at Invicta FC 4: Esparza vs. Hyatt on January 5, 2013. She was defeated by unanimous decision.

On August 6, 2013, Yamanaka announced her retirement on her official blog, thanking her fans for their support and saying she would like to continue to support her team, Master Japan, in the future.

== Submission grappling ==
Yamanaka made her debut in submission wrestling in the 2006 Smackgirl Grappling Queen Tournament, being defeated by American fighter Roxanne Modafferi by decision. She fought two more times on August 31, 2008 at Gi grappling 2008, first winning against Akiko Naito and then losing against Sayaka Shioda.

== Shoot boxing career ==
Yamanaka debuted in Shoot boxing on August 23, 2009 at the 2009 Shoot Boxing Girls S-Cup. She faced Mayumi "Super Benkei" Aoki, whom Yamanaka had previously defeated in MMA, and won the fight by TKO in round one.

On August 19, 2011, Yamanaka faced Megumi Yabushita in a shoot boxing match at the 2011 Shoot Boxing Girls S-Cup. She won the fight by TKO (doctor stoppage) after Yabushita suffered a knee injury in round three.

== Mixed martial arts record ==
Professional record breakdown
16 matches	12 wins	3 losses
By knockout	2	0
By submission	2	1
By decision	8	2
No contests	1	

Res.	Record	Opponent	Method	Event	Date	Round	Time	Location	Notes
Loss	12-3 (1)	Ediane Gomes	Decision (unanimous)	Invicta FC 4: Esparza vs. Hyatt	January 5, 2013	3	5:00	Kansas City, Kansas, United States	
Loss	12-2 (1)	Germaine de Randamie	Decision (unanimous)	Strikeforce: Rousey vs. Kaufman	August 18, 2012	3	5:00	San Diego, California, United States	
NC	12-1 (1)	Cris Cyborg	No Contest (overturned by CSAC)	Strikeforce: Melendez vs. Masvidal	December 17, 2011	1	0:16	San Diego, California, United States	For the Strikeforce Women's Featherweight Championship. Original loss via TKO; result overturned after Cyborg tested positive for Stanozolol.
Win	12-1	Esui	Submission (armbar)	Jewels 15th Ring	July 9, 2011	2	2:20	Tokyo, Japan	
Win	11-1	Molly Helsel	TKO (punches)	Jewels 11th Ring	December 17, 2010	2	3:12	Tokyo, Japan	
Win	10-1	Sandy Furner	Submission (forearm choke)	Shoot Boxing: Girls S-Cup 2010	August 29, 2010	1	1:45	Tokyo, Japan	
Win	9-1	Atsuko Emoto	Decision (unanimous)	Jewels 8th Ring	May 23, 2010	2	5:00	Tokyo, Japan	
Win	8-1	Hitomi Akano	Decision (split)	Jewels 7th Ring	March 19, 2010	2	5:00	Tokyo, Japan	
Win	7-1	Shannon Hooper	Decision (unanimous)	Jewels 3rd Ring	May 16, 2009	2	5:00	Tokyo, Japan	
Win	6-1	Michiko Takeda	TKO (punches)	Jewels 2nd Ring	February 4, 2009	2	3:25	Tokyo, Japan	
Win	5-1	Mayumi Aoki	Decision (unanimous)	Jewels 1st Ring	November 16, 2008	2	5:00	Tokyo, Japan	
Loss	4-1	Hitomi Akano	Submission (armbar)	Smackgirl: World ReMix 2008 Second Round	April 25, 2008	2	3:10	Tokyo, Japan	World ReMix Tournament 2008 Open Weight semi-final
Win	4-0	Yoko Takahashi	Decision (unanimous)	Smackgirl: Queens' Hottest Summer	September 6, 2007	3	5:00	Tokyo, Japan	Won Smackgirl Open Weight Championship
Win	3-0	Michiko Takeda	Decision (split)	Smackgirl: The Queen Said The USA Is Strongest	May 19, 2007	2	5:00	Tokyo, Japan	Super Gals Mix Cup Open Weight Tournament final
Win	2-0	Yuiga	Decision (unanimous)	Smackgirl: Will The Queen Paint The Shinjuku Skies Red?	March 11, 2007	2	5:00	Tokyo, Japan	Super Gals Mix Cup Open Weight Tournament semi-final
Win	1-0	Rie Murakami	Decision (unanimous)	Smackgirl: Legend of Extreme Women	November 29, 2006	2	5:00	Tokyo, Japan	Super Gals Mix Cup Open Weight Tournament quarterfinal

== Submission grappling ==
3 Fights, 1 Win, 2 Losses, 0 Draws
Result	Record	Opponent	Method	Event	Date	Round	Time	Location	Notes
Loss	1-2-0	(Japan) Sayaka Shioda	Submission (Armbar)	Gi grappling 2008	August 31, 2008	1	1:24	Tokyo, Japan	Queen Tournament expert open-weight semifinals
Win	1-1-0	(Japan) Akiko Naito	Submission (Armbar)	Gi grappling 2008	July 5, 2008	1	0:46	Tokyo, Japan	Queen Tournament expert open-weight second round
Loss	0-1-0	(United States) Roxanne Modafferi	Decision (1-0)	Smackgirl Grappling Queen Tournament 2006	July 23, 2006	1	7:00	Tokyo, Japan	Open Weight Grappling Tournament first round

Legend: Win Loss Draw/No contest

== Shoot boxing record ==
2 Fights, 2 Wins, 0 Losses, 0 Draws
Result	Record	Opponent	Method	Event	Date	Round	Time	Location	Notes
Win	2-0-0	(Japan) Megumi Yabushita	TKO (Doctor Stoppage)	2011 Shoot Boxing Girls S-Cup	August 19, 2011	3	0:03	Shibuya, Tokyo, Japan
Win	1-0-0	(Japan) Mayumi Aoki	TKO (Punches)	Shoot Boxing Girls Tournament 2009	August 23, 2009	1	0:57	Shinagawa, Tokyo, Japan

Legend: Win Loss Draw/No contest

== Championships and accomplishments ==
- Smackgirl Open Weight Champion
- Super Gals Mix Cup Open Weight Tournament winner

== See also ==
- List of female mixed martial artists
