= Seo Hee Ham =

South Korean mixed martial artist (born 1987)

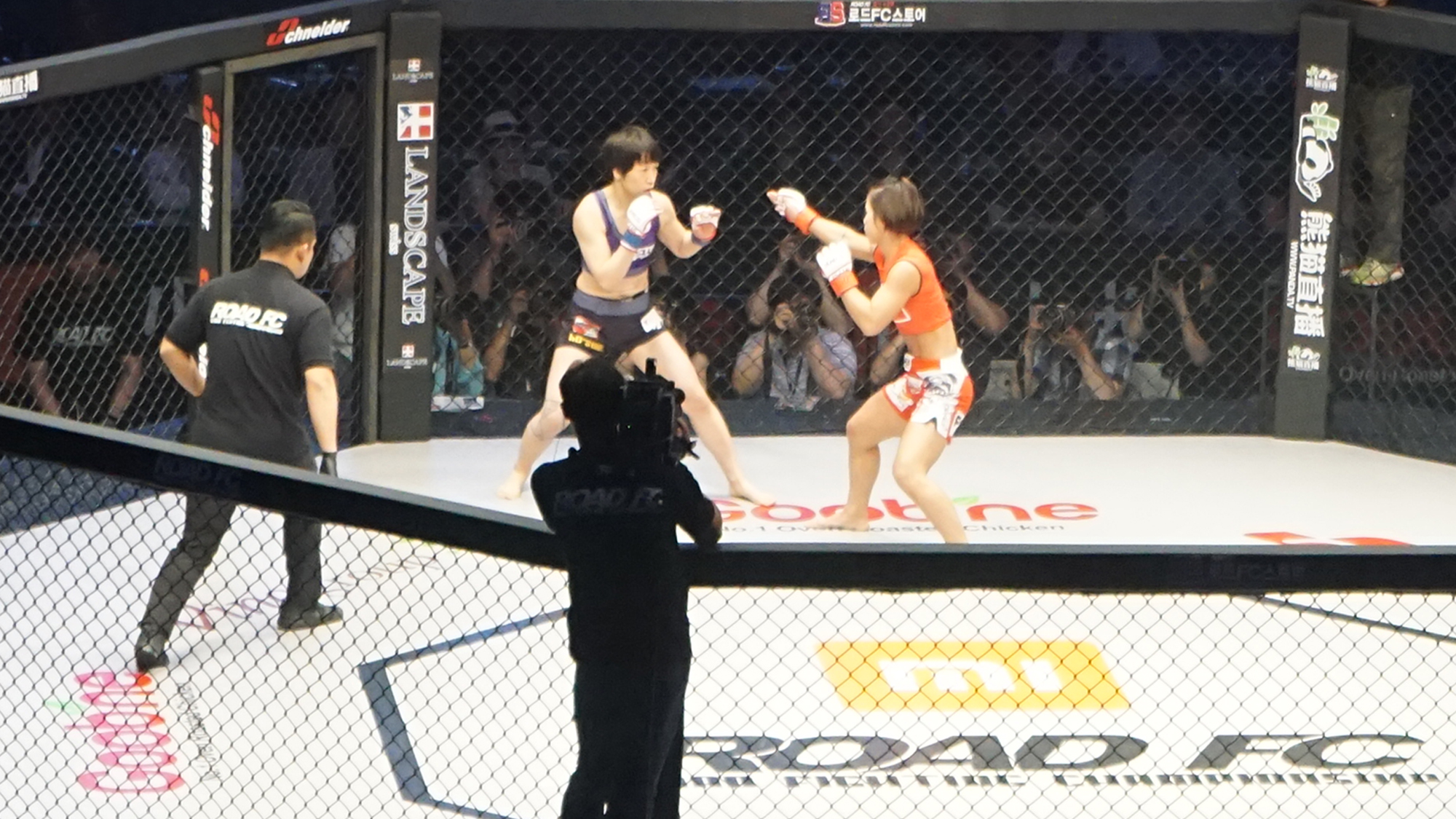
- Ham (right) fighting Mina Kurobe, 2017
- Born: March 8, 1987 (age 39); Gangwon Province, South Korea
- Other names: Hamzzang; Hamderlei Silva
- Height: 5 ft 2 in (157 cm)
- Weight: 114 lb (52 kg; 8 st 2 lb)
- Division: Atomweight; Strawweight
- Reach: 62 in (160 cm)
- Style: Kickboxing, Shootboxing
- Fighting out of: Busan, South Korea
- Team: Team Mad
- Years active: 2007–present (MMA); 2007–2014 (kickboxing)

Kickboxing record
- Total: 11
- Wins: 8
- By knockout: 1
- Losses: 3

Mixed martial arts record
- Total: 35
- Wins: 26
- By knockout: 4
- By submission: 3
- By decision: 19
- Losses: 9
- By knockout: 2
- By submission: 2
- By decision: 5

Other information
- Mixed martial arts record from Sherdog
- Last updated on: November 11, 2013

Ham Seo-hee (Korean: 함서희; [ham sʌhi]; born March 8, 1987), anglicised as Seo Hee Ham, is a South Korean professional mixed martial artist and kickboxer.

Ham previously competed in the MMA promotions Deep, Smackgirl, Jewels, Road FC, UFC, ONE Championship, and Rizin. She is a former Jewels Atomweight Champion, former Road FC Women's Atomweight Champion, and former Rizin Women's Super Atomweight Champion.

== Early life ==
Ham was born on March 8, 1987 in Gangwon Province, South Korea. She started training in kickboxing in 2004, when she was in her second year of high school. She was introduced to the Japanese MMA scene by UFC fighter Kim Dong-hyun.

With few female fighters to train with in South Korea, Ham regularly trains with male fighters, such as fellow gym member Dong Hyun Kim. She is nicknamed "Hamderlei Silva" because of the similarities between her fighting style and Wanderlei Silva's style. In Japan, she is occasionally nicknamed "Arale-chan", in reference to her looks outside of the ring bearing resemblance to the character Arale Norimaki from the manga series Dr. Slump. Currently, Ham uses "Hamzzang" as her official nickname.

== Mixed martial arts career ==
=== Japan ===
Ham debuted against Japanese MMA veteran Hisae Watanabe on February 16, 2007 at Deep 28 Impact, upsetting the favorite Watanabe by winning via unanimous decision. Ham was defeated by Miku Matsumoto via triangle choke submission on May 13, 2007 at clubDeep Toyama: Barbarian Festival 6.

Ham rebounded back from her first loss with a unanimous decision victory over Ayumi Saito on September 6, 2007 at Smackgirl 2007: Queens' Hottest Summer. On December 26, 2007 at Smackgirl 7th anniversary: Starting Over, Ham challenged Smackgirl Lightweight Champion Yuka Tsuji for her title, losing by unanimous decision in a match that Tsuji completely dominated. On February 14, 2008, Ham participated in the Smackgirl World ReMix Tournament 2008 Opening Round, where she defeated Saori Ishioka by unanimous decision. In the tournament semi-finals on April 25, 2008, Abe Ani Combat Club star Megumi Fujii handed Ham her third professional defeat by submitting her with an armbar in the Smackgirl World ReMix Tournament 2008 Second Round.

After a year without fights in MMA, Ham made her debut with MMA promotion Jewels and earned another victory on September 13, 2009 by defeating Misaki Takimoto by unanimous decision at Jewels 5th Ring. Ham next participated at Jewels 9th Ring in the first round of the inaugural Jewels Lightweight Queen Tournament, held to crown the first Jewels Lightweight Champion, where she defeated Mai Ichii by unanimous decision on July 31, 2010. Ham was slated to compete at Jewels 10th Ring, but since she decided to participate in two kickboxing matches with conflicting dates, Jewels released her. Jewels later announced that she would still participate in the semi-finals of the Lightweight Queen Tournament at Jewels 11th Ring. Ham faced Mika Nagano in the semi-finals and defeated Nagano by split decision. In the tournament final later that night, Ham was defeated by Ayaka Hamasaki via unanimous decision. Ham had a rematch against Saori Ishioka on February 25, 2011 at DEEP: 52 Impact in Tokyo, Japan. She once again defeated Ishioka by unanimous decision. On March 6, 2011, Ham faced Anna Saito in a mixed martial arts rules match at Gladiator 15: GI 2. Ham defeated Saito by unanimous decision. Ham faced Mei Yamaguchi in a Jewels vs. Valkyrie match at Jewels 15th Ring on July 9, 2011. She defeated Yamaguchi by unanimous decision. Ham challenged Jewels champion Ayaka Hamasaki in a rematch at Jewels 17th Ring on December 17, 2011. She was defeated by TKO (corner stoppage) after the first round when she could not continue due to injury. On April 21, 2013, Ham faced pro wrestler Ryo Mizunami at Gladiator: Dream, Power and Hope. She defeated Mizunami by submission due to an armbar early in the first round.

Ham dropped down in weight to challenge Naho Sugiyama for the Jewels Atomweight queen title at Jewels 24th Ring on May 25, 2013. She defeated Sugiyama by unanimous decision to become the new Jewels Atomweight queen champion. Following Jewels' closure, Ham's title was renamed the Deep Jewels Atomweight championship. She defended the title against Sadae Numata at Deep Jewels 2 on November 4, 2013. Ham won the fight by unanimous decision.

=== Ultimate Fighting Championship ===
In early November 2014, Seo Hee Ham signed a four-fight contract with Ultimate Fighting Championship to join UFC's Strawweight division. She made her debut against Joanne Calderwood at The Ultimate Fighter: A Champion Will Be Crowned Finale on December 12, 2014. She lost the fight by unanimous decision.

Ham was expected to face Bec Rawlings on May 10, 2015 at UFC Fight Night 65. However, Ham pulled out of the bout on April 10 and was replaced by Lisa Ellis.

After nearly a year away from the company, Ham returned to face Cortney Casey on November 28, 2015 at UFC Fight Night: Henderson vs. Masvidal. She won the fight via unanimous decision. The win also earned Ham her first Fight of the Night bonus award. She lost to Danielle Taylor at UFC Fight Night 101 on Nov. 26, 2016 via split decision and was subsequently released from the promotion.

=== Road FC ===
After briefly considering retirement, Ham signed with Road FC where she became the atomweight champion with a victory over Mina Kurobe. On December 23, 2017, she successfully defended her atomweight championship with a first round stoppage over Jinh Yu Frey.

=== Rizin ===
On June 21, 2019, it was announced Ham would face former DEEP Champion Tomo Maesawa at Rizin 17 on July 28, 2019. She won the fight by TKO in the first round.

Next, Ham faced Miyuu Yamamoto at Rizin 19 on October 12, 2019. She won the fight via technical knockout in the second round.

With two consecutive victories in Rizin, Ham earned a title shot against Ayaka Hamasaki at Rizin 20 on December 31, 2019. She won the trilogy fight via split decision, becoming the second Rizin Women's Super Atomweight Champion.

Ham vacated her Rizin Atomweight title in October 2020, as she couldn't come to an agreement with Rizin for her next fight.

=== ONE Championship ===
After vacating her Rizin Atomweight title, Ham signed with ONE Championship, where she will compete in the atomweight division. She was scheduled to take part in the ONE Atomweight Grand Prix. It was reported that Ham will face Denice Zamboanga in the quarter-final of the ONE Women's Atomweight Grand Prix at ONE Championship: Empower on May 28, 2021. The event was later postponed due to COVID-19 precautions. The event was rescheduled for September 3, 2021. She won the close bout via split decision. Due to the controversy the decision stirred, the bout was placed under review but the ONE Championship committee left the result standing.

Ham was scheduled to face Stamp Fairtex in the semi-final bout of ONE Women's Atomweight Grand Prix at ONE Championship: Next Generation on October 29, 2021. Ham had to pull out of the bout due to injury and was replaced by alternate bout winner Julie Mezabarba.

Ham was scheduled to rematch Denice Zamboanga at ONE: X on December 5, 2021. Their rematch was later postponed to March 6, 2022. Ham failed the hydration test the day before the fight, and was given until midnight to pass. Ham was able to pass the test in the mandated time and won the fight by unanimous decision.

Ham was scheduled to face Itsuki Hirata at ONE 163 on November 18, 2022. However, Hirata missed weight and failed the hydration test, and the match was scrapped after Ham declined a catchweight bout due to Hirata's history of missing weight. The pair was rescheduled for March 25, 2023, at ONE Fight Night 8. She won the fight via unanimous decision.

Ham faced Stamp Fairtex at ONE Fight Night 14 on September 29, 2023. The bout was originally scheduled to be for the interim ONE Women's Atomweight title, however after reigning champion Angela Lee announced her retirement during the event, the fight became for the vacant undisputed title. Ham lost the fight via technical knockout in the third round.

== Kickboxing career ==
Ham had her first professional kickboxing match at CMA Festival 2: Ikuhisa Minowa Debut 10 Anniversary Tournament on July 23, 2007, where she defeated former Smackgirl Open Weight Champion Megumi Yabushita by unanimous decision. On November 3, 2009, Ham defeated Ayano Oishi in a K-1 rules match by unanimous decision at Japan-South Korea friendship international martial arts tournament Gladiator Okayama tournament.

At Jewels 7th Ring on March 19, 2010, Ham had an exhibition match against Shoot boxing rising star Rena Kubota.

Ham earned another unanimous decision victory over Japanese fighter Miyu Matsui on April 25, 2010 at Gladiator 6, winning the CMA KPW Lightweight Championship.

On February 27, 2011, Ham faced Megumi Yabushita for a second time at Gladiator 14: KOK Samurai Series. Ham won the fight by TKO in the second round.

On August 19, 2011, Ham entered the 2011 Shoot Boxing Girls S-Cup tournament. She defeated Emi Fujino and Mina in the opening rounds, but lost to Erika Kamimura via unanimous decision in the tournament final.

Ham faced Erika Kamimura in a rematch at Rise 88 on June 2, 2012. She was defeated by unanimous decision.

Ham entered the 2012 Shoot Boxing Girls S-Cup on August 25, 2012. She defeated Lisa Ellis to advance to the semi-final round, but lost to Rena Kubota via unanimous decision.

== Championships and accomplishments ==
- CMA/KPW Women's Champion
  - CMA/KPW Women's Lightweight Championship (One time)
    - Two successful title defenses
- Jewels
  - Jewels Atomweight Championship (One time)
    - Two successful title defenses
  - Jewels Lightweight Queen Tournament Runner-up
- Ultimate Fighting Championship
  - Fight of the Night (One time) vs. Cortney Casey
- Road Fighting Championship
  - Road FC Women's Atomweight Championship (one time)
    - Two successful title defenses
- Rizin Fighting Federation
  - Rizin Women's Super Atomweight Championship (one time)

== Other activities ==
Ham defeated pro-wrestler Stalker Ichikawa by left high kick KO at Gladiator 10 on October 3, 2010. She defeated pro-wrestler Antonio Koinoki by KO at Gladiator 11 on October 9, 2010.

== Mixed martial arts record ==
Professional record breakdown
35 matches	26 wins	9 losses
By knockout	4	2
By submission	3	2
By decision	19	5

Res.	Record	Opponent	Method	Event	Date	Round	Time	Location	Notes
Loss	26–9	Stamp Fairtex	TKO (punches to the body)	ONE Fight Night 14	September 30, 2023	3	1:04	Kallang, Singapore	For the vacant ONE Women's Atomweight Championship (115 lb).
Win	26–8	Itsuki Hirata	Decision (unanimous)	ONE Fight Night 8	March 25, 2023	3	5:00	Kallang, Singapore	
Win	25–8	Denice Zamboanga	Decision (unanimous)	ONE: X	March 26, 2022	3	5:00	Kallang, Singapore	
Win	24–8	Denice Zamboanga	Decision (split)	ONE: Empower	September 3, 2021	3	5:00	Kallang, Singapore	ONE Women's Atomweight World Grand Prix Quarterfinal. After withdrew from tournament due to injury.
Win	23–8	Ayaka Hamasaki	Decision (split)	Rizin 20	December 31, 2019	3	5:00	Saitama, Japan	Won the Rizin Super Atomweight Championship.
Win	22–8	Miyuu Yamamoto	TKO (punches)	Rizin 19	October 12, 2019	2	9:42	Osaka, Japan	
Win	21–8	Tomo Maesawa	TKO (knees)	Rizin 17	July 28, 2019	1	3:13	Saitama, Japan	
Win	20–8	Jeong Eun Park	Decision (unanimous)	Road FC 051 XX	December 17, 2018	3	5:00	Seoul, South Korea	Defended the Road FC Women's Atomweight Championship.
Win	19–8	Jinh Yu Frey	TKO (punches)	Road FC 045 XX	December 23, 2017	1	4:40	Seoul, South Korea	Defended the Road FC Women's Atomweight Championship.
Win	18–8	Mina Kurobe	TKO (punches)	Road FC 039	June 10, 2017	3	4:13	Seoul, South Korea	Return to Atomweight; Won the inaugural Road FC Women's Atomweight Championship.
Loss	17–8	Danielle Taylor	Decision (split)	UFC Fight Night: Whittaker vs. Brunson	November 27, 2016	3	5:00	Melbourne, Australia	
Loss	17–7	Bec Rawlings	Decision (unanimous)	UFC Fight Night: Hunt vs. Mir	March 20, 2016	3	5:00	Brisbane, Australia	
Win	17–6	Cortney Casey	Decision (unanimous)	UFC Fight Night: Henderson vs. Masvidal	November 28, 2015	3	5:00	Seoul, South Korea	Fight of the Night.
Loss	16–6	Joanne Calderwood	Decision (unanimous)	The Ultimate Fighter: A Champion Will Be Crowned Finale	December 12, 2014	3	5:00	Las Vegas, Nevada, United States	Return to Strawweight.
Win	16–5	Saori Ishioka	Submission (armbar)	Deep Jewels 6	November 3, 2014	2	2:43	Tokyo, Japan	Defended the Jewels Atomweight Championship (106 lbs).
Win	15–5	Alyona Rassohyna	Decision (unanimous)	Road FC 018	August 30, 2014	2	5:00	Seoul, South Korea	
Win	14–5	Shino VanHoose	Decision (unanimous)	Road FC Korea 003: Korea vs. Brazil	April 6, 2014	2	5:00	Seoul, South Korea	
Win	13–5	Sadae Numata	Decision (unanimous)	Deep Jewels 2	November 4, 2013	3	5:00	Tokyo, Japan	Defended the Jewels Atomweight Championship (106 lbs).
Win	12–5	Naho Sugiyama	Decision (unanimous)	Jewels 24th Ring	May 25, 2013	3	5:00	Tokyo, Japan	Atomweight debut. Won the Jewels Atomweight Championship (106 lb).
Win	11–5	Ryo Mizunami	Submission (armbar)	Gladiator 54: Dream, Power and Hope	April 21, 2013	1	1:05	Sapporo, Japan	Defended the CMA/KPW Women's Lightweight Championship.
Loss	10–5	Ayaka Hamasaki	TKO (corner stoppage)	Jewels 17th Ring	December 17, 2011	1	5:00	Tokyo, Japan	For the Jewels Lightweight Championship (115 lb).
Win	10–4	Mei Yamaguchi	Decision (unanimous)	Jewels 15th Ring	July 9, 2011	2	5:00	Tokyo, Japan	
Win	9–4	Anna Saito	Decision (unanimous)	Gladiator 15: GI 2	March 6, 2011	2	5:00	Kawasaki, Japan	Defended the CMA/KPW Women's Lightweight Championship.
Win	8–4	Saori Ishioka	Decision (unanimous)	Deep: 52 Impact	February 25, 2011	2	5:00	Tokyo, Japan	
Loss	7–4	Ayaka Hamasaki	Decision (unanimous)	Jewels 11th Ring	December 17, 2010	2	5:00	Tokyo, Japan	Jewels Lightweight Queen Tournament Final.
Win	7–3	Mika Nagano	Decision (split)	Jewels 11th Ring	December 17, 2010	2	5:00	Tokyo, Japan	Jewels Lightweight Queen Tournament Semifinal.
Win	6–3	Mai Ichii	Decision (unanimous)	Jewels 9th Ring	July 31, 2010	2	5:00	Tokyo, Japan	Jewels Lightweight Queen Tournament Quarterfinal.
Win	5–3	Misaki Takimoto	Decision (unanimous)	Jewels 5th Ring	September 13, 2009	2	5:00	Tokyo, Japan	
Loss	4–3	Megumi Fujii	Submission (armbar)	Smackgirl: World ReMix 2008 Second Round	April 25, 2008	1	3:39	Tokyo, Japan	Smackgirl Lightweight Tournament Semifinal.
Win	4–2	Saori Ishioka	Decision (unanimous)	Smackgirl: World ReMix 2008 Opening Round	February 14, 2008	2	5:00	Tokyo, Japan	Smackgirl Lightweight Tournament Quarterfinal.
Loss	3–2	Yuka Tsuji	Decision (unanimous)	Smackgirl: Starting Over	December 26, 2007	3	5:00	Tokyo, Japan	For the Smackgirl Lightweight Championship.
Win	3–1	Amantiva Golbahar	Submission (rear-naked choke)	X-Impact World Cup	October 20, 2007	1	0:10	Suwon, South Korea	
Win	2–1	Ayumi Saito	Decision (unanimous)	Smackgirl 2007: Queens' Hottest Summer	September 6, 2007	2	5:00	Tokyo, Japan	
Loss	1–1	Miku Matsumoto	Submission (triangle choke)	Deep: clubDeep Toyama: Barbarian Festival 6	May 13, 2007	2	3:44	Toyama, Japan	
Win	1–0	Hisae Watanabe	Decision (unanimous)	Deep: 28 Impact	February 16, 2007	2	5:00	Tokyo, Japan	

== Kickboxing record ==
11 fights, 8 wins, 3 losses
Result	Record	Opponent	Method	Event	Date	Round	Time	Location	Notes
Win	8–3–0	Kira Yuki	Decision (unanimous)	DEEP JEWELS 4	May 18, 2014	3	3:00	Tokyo, Japan	Kickboxing rules
Loss	7–3–0	Rena Kubota	Decision (unanimous)	2012 Shoot Boxing Girls S-Cup	August 25, 2012	3+1	2:00	Tokyo, Japan	Shoot boxing rules. 2012 Girls S-Cup semi-final
Win	7–2–0	Lisa Ellis	Decision (unanimous)	2012 Shoot Boxing Girls S-Cup	August 25, 2012	3	2:00	Tokyo, Japan	Shoot boxing rules. 2012 Girls S-Cup quarterfinal
Loss	6–2–0	Erika Kamimura	Decision (unanimous)	Rise 88	June 2, 2012	3	3:00	Tokyo, Japan	Kickboxing rules
Loss	6–1–0	Erika Kamimura	Decision (unanimous)	2011 Shoot Boxing Girls S-Cup	August 19, 2011	3	2:00	Tokyo, Japan	Shoot boxing rules. 2011 Girls S-Cup final
Win	6–0–0	Mina	Decision (majority)	2011 Shoot Boxing Girls S-Cup	August 19, 2011	3	2:00	Tokyo, Japan	Shoot boxing rules. 2011 Girls S-Cup semi-final
Win	5–0–0	Emi Fujino	Decision (majority)	2011 Shoot Boxing Girls S-Cup	August 19, 2011	3	2:00	Tokyo, Japan	Shoot boxing rules. 2011 Girls S-Cup quarterfinal
Win	4–0–0	Megumi Yabushita	TKO (punches)	Gladiator 14: KOK Samurai Series	February 27, 2011	2	0:55	Tokyo, Japan	Kickboxing rules
Win	3–0–0	Miyu Matsui	Decision (unanimous)	Gladiator 6	April 25, 2010	3	3:00	Kobe, Japan	Won CMA KPW Lightweight Championship
Win	2–0–0	Ayano Oishi	Decision (unanimous)	Japan-South Korea friendship international martial arts tournament Gladiator Okayama tournament	November 3, 2009	3	3:00	Okayama, Japan	K-1 rules
Win	1–0–0	Megumi Yabushita	Decision (unanimous)	CMA Festival 2: Ikuhisa Minowa debut 10 anniversary tournament	July 23, 2007	3	2:00	Tokyo, Japan	Kickboxing rules

Legend: Win Loss Draw/No contest

== See also ==
- List of female mixed martial artists
- List of female kickboxers
