= Jewels (mixed martial arts) =

MMA promoter based in Japan

- Company type: Private
- Industry: Mixed martial arts promotion
- Predecessor: Smackgirl
- Founded: October 2008
- Headquarters: Shibuya, Tokyo, Japan
- Area served: Japan
- Key people: Yuichi Ozono (president); Shigeru Saeki (supervisor)
- Parent: Marverous Japan Co., Ltd.
- Website: w-jewels.jp

Jewels (styled JEWELS in capitals) is a mixed martial arts organization owned by Marverous Japan Co., Ltd., focused on female fighters. It is the direct successor of Smackgirl. It has a working relationship with fellow mixed martial arts promotion Deep presided by Shigeru Saeki (also the Jewels supervisor).

== History ==
After the women’s MMA promotion Smackgirl faced severe financial difficulties caused by unexpected departures from major sponsors and television network deals, an executive from the Japanese event production company Archery Inc., Yuichi Ozono, formed the company Marverous Japan, who acquired the assets and rights formerly belonging to Smackgirl parent company Kilgore. Since the reputation of Smackgirl was tarnished by all the problems it faced, it was decided to start anew.

On June 9, 2012, it was announced that Jewels has formed a strategic partnership with American promotion Invicta Fighting Championships to cross-promote the world's top female fighters on their respective fight cards in the United States and Japan.

On May 25, 2013, Jewels announced that it would cease operations as an independent company, with Yuichi Ozono, then head of Jewels, stepping down and Shigeru Saeki from Deep, formerly supervisor, taking the full direction. This move transferred fighters and the promotion’s image to the new Deep Jewels brand, which would be managed by Deep.

== Current champions ==
Class	Champion	Since	Defences	-
Featherweight; 65.8 kg (145.1 lb)	(Japan) Yoko Higashi	May 8, 2022	0	
Bantamweight; 61.2 kg (134.9 lb)	Vacant			
Flyweight; 56.7 kg (125.0 lb)	(Japan) Rin Nakai	May 8, 2022	1	
Strawweight; 52.2 kg (115.1 lb)	(Japan) Machi Fukuda	September 7, 2025	0	
Atomweight; 47.6 kg (104.9 lb)	(Japan) Seika Izawa	March 24, 2024	0	
Microweight; 44 kg (97.0 lb)	(Japan) Saori Oshima	May 26, 2024	0	

== Championship history ==
=== Featherweight championship ===
No.	Name	Event	Date	Defenses
1	(Japan) Yoko Higashi def. Reina Miura	Deep Jewels 37; Tokyo, Japan	May 8, 2022	

=== Bantamweight championship ===
Formerly known as middleweight until May 2015.

No.	Name	Event	Date	Defenses
1	(Japan) Takayo Hashi def. Shizuka Sugiyama	Deep Jewels 4 Tokyo, Japan	May 18, 2014	
2	(South Korea) Ji Yeon Kim	Deep Jewels 9 Tokyo, Japan	August 22, 2015	
Kim vacated the title when she signed with the UFC.

=== Flyweight championship ===
No.	Name	Event	Date	Defenses
1	(Japan) Rin Nakai def. Shizuka Sugiyama	Deep Jewels 37; Tokyo, Japan	May 8, 2022	1. def. Yuka Okutomi at Deep Jewels 53 on May 24, 2026 in Tokyo, Japan.

=== Strawweight championship ===
Formerly known as lightweight until May 2015.

No.	Name	Event	Date	Defenses
1	(Japan) Ayaka Hamasaki def. Seo Hee Ham	Jewels 11th Ring; Tokyo, Japan	December 17, 2010	1. def. Seo Hee Ham at Jewels 17th Ring on December 17, 2011 in Tokyo, Japan; 2. def. Yuka Tsuji at Jewels 19th Ring on May 26, 2012 in Osaka, Japan; 3. def. Emi Fujino at Jewels 22nd Ring on December 15, 2012 in Osaka, Japan
Ayaka Hamasaki vacated the title on August 31, 2013.
2	(Japan) Emi Tomimatsu def. Mizuki Inoue	Deep Jewels 3 Tokyo, Japan	February 16, 2014	
3	(Japan) Mizuki Inoue	Deep Jewels 5 Tokyo, Japan	August 9, 2014	1. def. Emi Fujino at Deep Jewels 9 on August 29, 2015 in Tokyo, Japan
-	(Japan) Miki Motono def. Asami Naki for interim title	Deep Jewels 29; Tokyo, Japan	July 23, 2020	
-	(Japan) Seika Izawa def. interim champion Miki Motono	Deep Jewels 33; Tokyo, Japan	June 19, 2021	
Inoue vacated the title on March 15, 2022. Izawa was promoted to full champion status.
4	(Japan) Seika Izawa promoted to undisputed champion	—	March 15, 2022	
-	(Japan) Arisa Matsuda def. Machi Fukuda for interim title	Deep Jewels 43; Tokyo, Japan	November 23, 2023	
-	(South Korea) Si Woo Park def. Machi Fukuda for interim title	Deep Jewels 45; Tokyo, Japan	May 26, 2024	
Izawa vacated the title on July 11, 2025. Park was promoted to full champion status
5	(South Korea) Si Woo Park promoted to undisputed champion	—	July 11, 2025	
6	(Japan) Machi Fukuda	Deep Jewels 50; Tokyo, Japan	September 7, 2025	

=== Atomweight championship ===
Formerly known as featherweight until May 2015.

No.	Name	Event	Date	Defenses
1	(Japan) Naho Sugiyama def. Misaki Takimoto	Jewels 17th Ring; Tokyo, Japan	December 17, 2011	
2	(South Korea) Ham Seo-hee	Jewels 24th Ring; Tokyo, Japan	May 25, 2013	1. def. Sadae Numata at Deep Jewels 2 on November 4, 2013 in Tokyo, Japan; 2. def. Saori Ishioka at Deep Jewels 6 on November 3, 2014 in Tokyo, Japan
Seo Hee Ham vacated the title on December 11, 2014.
3	(Japan) Mei Yamaguchi def. Satomi Takano	Deep Jewels 8 Tokyo, Japan	May 31, 2015	
Mei Yamaguchi vacated the title on April 19, 2016.
4	(Japan) Naho Sugiyama (2) def. Emi Tomimatsu	Deep Jewels 12; Tokyo, Japan	June 5, 2016	
5	(Japan) Mina Kurobe	Deep Jewels 15; Tokyo, Japan	February 25, 2017	1. def. Satomi Takano at Deep Jewels 19 on March 10, 2018 in Tokyo, Japan
6	(Japan) Tomo Maesawa	Deep Jewels 22; Tokyo, Japan	December 1, 2018	1. def. Emi Tomimatsu at Deep Jewels 26 on October 21, 2019 in Tokyo, Japan; 2. def. Hikaru Aono at Deep Jewels 30 on October 31, 2020 in Tokyo, Japan
Maesawa retired following her second title defense.
7	(Japan) Saori Oshima def. Hikaru Aono	Deep Jewels 33; Tokyo, Japan	June 20, 2021	1. def. Moeri Suda at Deep Jewels 37 on May 8, 2022 in Tokyo, Japan
8	(South Korea) Park Si-yoon	Deep 115 Impact: Deep Vs. Black Combat 2 Tokyo, Japan	September 18, 2023	
9	(Japan) Seika Izawa	Deep Jewels 44; Tokyo, Japan	March 24, 2024	

=== Microweight Championship ===
A four woman tournament was scheduled prior to Deep Jewels 28 to crown the promotions first Microweight Champion with the challengers being Emi Sato, Mizuki Furuse, Suwanan Boonsorn and Yasuko Tamada with Moe Sasaki as reserve. Furuse and Boonsorn advanced to the final which was scheduled to take place at Deep Jewels 29 before the COVID-19 pandemic, however this event and the match couldn't be rescheduled when the promotion returned with the show. On November 5, it was announced that Furuse would be taking an extended absence as she was both pregnant and getting married. As a result of these developments, Jewels declared Boonsorn as the inaugural champion.

No.	Name	Event	Date	Defenses
1	(Thailand) Suwanan Boonsorn	-	November 5, 2020	
2	(Japan) Aya Murakami	Deep Jewels 42; Tokyo, Japan	September 10, 2023	
3	(Japan) Saori Oshima	Deep Jewels 45; Tokyo, Japan	May 26, 2024	

=== Tournament champions ===
Tournament	Winner
Rough Stone Grand Prix 2009 -60 kilograms (132 lb)	(Germany) Alexandra Sanchez
Rough Stone Grand Prix 2009 -54 kilograms (119 lb)	(Japan) Mika Nagano
Rough Stone Grand Prix 2009 -48 kilograms (106 lb)	(Japan) Asami Kodera
Rough Stone Grand Prix 2010 -56 kilograms (123 lb)	(Japan) Mizuki Inoue
Rough Stone Grand Prix 2010 -52 kilograms (115 lb)	(Japan) Hiroko Kitamura
Rough Stone Grand Prix 2010 -48 kilograms (106 lb)	(Japan) Kikuyo Ishikawa
First lightweight queen decision tournament	(Japan) Ayaka Hamasaki
First featherweight queen decision tournament	(Japan) Naho Sugiyama
Jewels/Deep Kickboxing Tournament 2012 -47 kilograms (104 lb)	(Japan) Momoka
Deep - Jewels Lightweight Grand Prix 2013 -52 kilograms (115 lb)	(Japan) Emi Tomimatsu
Deep - Jewels Featherweight Grand Prix 2015 -48 kilograms (106 lb)	(Japan) Mei Yamaguchi
Deep - Jewels Atomweight Grand Prix 2021 -48 kilograms (106 lb)	(Japan) Saori Oshima

== Events ==
#	Event title	Date	Arena	Location	Attendance
68	Deep - Jewels 44	March 24, 2024	New Pier Hall	Tokyo, Japan	
67	Deep - Jewels 43	November 23, 2023	New Pier Hall	Tokyo, Japan	
66	Deep - Jewels 42	September 10, 2023	New Pier Hall	Tokyo, Japan	
65	Deep - Jewels 41	May 28, 2023	New Pier Hall	Tokyo, Japan	
64	Deep - Jewels 40	February 18, 2023	Shinjuku FACE	Shinjuku, Japan	
63	Deep - Jewels 39	November 22, 2022	New Pier Hall	Tokyo, Japan	
62	Deep - Jewels 38	September 10, 2022	New Pier Hall	Tokyo, Japan	
61	Deep - Jewels 37	May 8, 2022	Korakuen Hall	Tokyo, Japan	
60	Deep - Jewels 36	March 12, 2022	New Pier Hall	Tokyo, Japan	
59	Deep - Jewels 35	December 11, 2021	New Pier Hall	Minato, Tokyo, Japan	
58	Deep - Jewels 34	September 4, 2021	Shinjuku Face	Tokyo, Japan	
57	Deep - Jewels 33	June 19, 2021	New Pier Hall	Tokyo, Japan	
56	Deep - Jewels 32	March 7, 2021	Korakuen Hall	Tokyo, Japan	
55	Deep - Jewels 31	December 19, 2020	Shinjuku Face	Tokyo, Japan	
54	Deep - Jewels 30	October 31, 2020	New Pier Hall	Tokyo, Japan	
53	Deep - Jewels 29	July 23, 2020	Korakuen Hall	Tokyo, Japan	
52	Deep - Jewels 28	February 24, 2020	New Pier Hall	Tokyo, Japan	
51	Deep - Jewels 27	December 22, 2019	Abeno Activity Center	Osaka, Japan	
50	Deep - Jewels 26	October 21, 2019	Korakuen Hall	Tokyo, Japan	
49	Deep - Jewels 25	September 1, 2019	Shinjuku Face	Tokyo, Japan	
48	Deep - Jewels 24	June 9, 2019	Shinjuku Face	Tokyo, Japan	
47	Deep - Jewels 23	March 8, 2019	Korakuen Hall	Tokyo, Japan	
46	Deep - Jewels 22	December 1, 2018	Shinjuku Face	Tokyo, Japan	
45	Deep - Jewels 21	September 16, 2018	Shinjuku Face	Tokyo, Japan	
44	Deep - Jewels 20	June 9, 2018	Shinjuku Face	Tokyo, Japan	
43	Deep - Jewels 19	March 10, 2018	Shinjuku Face	Tokyo, Japan	
42	Deep - Jewels 18	December 2, 2017	Shinjuku Face	Tokyo, Japan	
41	Deep - Jewels 17	August 26, 2017	Shinjuku Face	Tokyo, Japan	
40	Deep - Jewels 16	May 20, 2017	Shinjuku Face	Tokyo, Japan	
39	Deep - Jewels 15	February 25, 2017	Shinjuku Face	Tokyo, Japan	
38	Deep - Jewels 14	November 3, 2016	Shinjuku Face	Tokyo, Japan	
37	Deep - Jewels 13	August 27, 2016	Differ Ariake	Tokyo, Japan	
36	Deep - Jewels 12	June 5, 2016	Shinjuku Face	Tokyo, Japan	
35	Deep - Jewels 11	March 5, 2016	Shinjuku Face	Tokyo, Japan	
34	Deep - Jewels 10	November 22, 2015	Shinjuku Face	Tokyo, Japan	
33	Deep - Jewels 9	August 29, 2015	Differ Ariake	Tokyo, Japan	
32	Deep - Jewels 8	May 31, 2015	Shinjuku Face	Tokyo, Japan	
31	Deep - Jewels 7	February 21, 2015	Shinjuku Face	Tokyo, Japan	
30	Deep - Jewels 6	November 3, 2014	Shinjuku Face	Tokyo, Japan	
29	Deep - Jewels 5	August 9, 2014	Shinjuku Face	Tokyo, Japan	
28	Deep - Jewels 4	May 18, 2014	Shinjuku Face	Tokyo, Japan	
27	Deep - Jewels 3	February 16, 2014	Shinjuku Face	Tokyo, Japan	
26	Deep - Jewels 2	November 4, 2013	Shinjuku Face	Tokyo, Japan	
25	Deep - Jewels 1	August 31, 2013	Shinjuku Face	Tokyo, Japan	
24	Jewels 24th Ring	May 25, 2013	Shinjuku Face	Tokyo, Japan	
23	Jewels 23rd Ring	March 30, 2013	Shin-Kiba 1st Ring	Tokyo, Japan	
22	Jewels 22nd Ring	December 15, 2012	Differ Ariake	Tokyo, Japan	
21	Jewels 21st Ring	September 22, 2012	Shin-Kiba 1st Ring	Tokyo, Japan	
20	Jewels 20th Ring	July 21, 2012	Differ Ariake	Tokyo, Japan	
19	Jewels 19th Ring	May 26, 2012	Azalea Taisho Hall	Osaka, Japan	
18	Jewels 18th Ring	March 3, 2012	Shin-Kiba 1st Ring	Tokyo, Japan	
17	Jewels 17th Ring	December 17, 2011	Shinjuku Face	Tokyo, Japan	370
16	Jewels 16th Ring	September 11, 2011	Shin-Kiba 1st Ring	Tokyo, Japan	822
15	Jewels 15th Ring	July 9, 2011	Shinjuku Face	Tokyo, Japan	426
14	Jewels 13th Ring & 14th Ring (Note: Jewels 14th Ring was originally an independent event planned for July 9, 2011. Jewels merged both events in a single date after the cancellation of Jewels 12th Ring.)	May 14, 2011	Shin-Kiba 1st Ring	Tokyo, Japan	328 / 324
-	Jewels 12th Ring	March 11, 2011	Shinjuku Face	Tokyo, Japan	cancelled (Note: The event was cancelled a few hours before the start due to the 2011 Tōhoku earthquake and tsunami.)
13	Jewels 11th Ring	December 17, 2010	Korakuen Hall	Tokyo, Japan	1216
12	Jewels 10th Ring	October 10, 2010	Shin-Kiba 1st Ring	Tokyo, Japan	464
11	Jewels 9th Ring	July 31, 2010	Shinjuku Face	Tokyo, Japan	578
10	Jewels 8th Ring	May 23, 2010	Shin-Kiba 1st Ring	Tokyo, Japan	438
9	Jewels 7th Ring	March 19, 2010	Shinjuku Face	Tokyo, Japan	696
8	Jewels - Rough Stone: Second Ring	January 31, 2010	Caesar Gym Shin-Koiwa	Tokyo, Japan	
7	Jewels 6th Ring	December 11, 2009	Shinjuku Face	Tokyo, Japan	762
6	Jewels 5th Ring	September 13, 2009	Shinjuku Face	Tokyo, Japan	610
5	Jewels 4th Ring	July 11, 2009	Shin-Kiba 1st Ring	Tokyo, Japan	464
4	Jewels 3rd Ring	May 16, 2009	Shinjuku Face	Tokyo, Japan	734
3	Jewels: Rough Stone: First Ring	April 19, 2009	Isami Wrestle Budokan	Warabi, Saitama, Japan	
2	Jewels 2nd Ring	February 4, 2009	Shinjuku Face	Tokyo, Japan	588
1	Jewels 1st Ring	November 16, 2008	Shinjuku Face	Tokyo, Japan	645

== See also ==
- List of Deep champions
- List of Deep events
- Deep Jewels events
