= Saori Ishioka =

Japanese mixed martial artist

- Born: September 13, 1987 (age 39); Hatsukaichi, Hiroshima Prefecture, Japan
- Other names: Shooting Star
- Nationality: Japanese
- Height: 5 ft 2 in (1.57 m)
- Weight: 114 lb (52 kg)
- Division: Strawweight
- Fighting out of: Koganei, Tokyo, Japan
- Team: Zendokai Koganei
- Years active: 2007-present (MMA); 2009-present (shoot boxing)

Kickboxing record
- Total: 3
- Wins: 2
- Losses: 1

Mixed martial arts record
- Total: 27
- Wins: 15
- By knockout: 1
- By submission: 9
- By decision: 5
- Losses: 12
- By submission: 4
- By decision: 8

Other information
- Website: Official blog
- Mixed martial arts record from Sherdog
- Last updated on: June 24, 2013

Saori Ishioka (石岡 沙織, Ishioka Saori; born on September 13, 1987) is a Japanese female mixed martial artist, kickboxer and karateka. She has participated in MMA promotions Smackgirl and Jewels. Her nickname is Shooting Star.

== Background ==
Ishioka was born on September 13, 1987 in Hiroshima Prefecture, Japan. She started judo during childhood, earning third place in an all-high school tournament in China. She graduated from the Hiroshima Prefectural Hiroshima Technical High School.

In 2006, she was introduced to the Karate-do Zendokai association in their Hiroshima branch and, wanting to become a professional martial artist, she moved to Tokyo.

== Mixed martial arts career ==
Ishioka debuted with a unanimous decision defeat against Kyoko Takabayashi at Smackgirl - F 2007: The Next Cinderella Tournament 2007 First Stage on March 11, 2007.

On April 28, 2007, Ishioka participated at Smackgirl 2007: The Dance of the Taisho Romance in the Next Cinderella Tournament 2007 lightweight first round, where she defeated Yoko Oyama by unanimous decision. In the next round of the tournament, at Smackgirl - F 2007: The Next Cinderella Tournament 2007 2nd Stage on May 19, 2007, Mei Yamaguchi defeated Ishioka with a kneebar.

Ishioka rebounded back with three consecutive victories. The first one was against Masako Yoshida, whom Ishioka defeated by unanimous decision on September 6, 2007 at Smackgirl 2007: Queens' Hottest Summer. She next defeated Miyuki Ariga, also by unanimous decision, in a match with special rules on November 25, 2007 during Kingdom of Grapple Live 2007. Her third consecutive victory came when she defeated American fighter Thricia Poovey by armbar submission at Smackgirl 7th Anniversary: Starting Over on December 26, 2007.

Her winning streak came to an end on February 14, 2008 at the hands of South Korean kickboxer Seo Hee Ham, who defeated Ishioka by unanimous decision in the Smackgirl World ReMix Tournament 2008 Opening Round, during the first round of the lightweight tournament.

Ishioka earned another victory by armbar submission against Harumi on August 6, 2008 at Kingdom of Grapple mini Live in Summerfest!! '08.

On November 16, 2008, Ishioka made her debut with MMA promotion Jewels at Jewels 1st Ring, where she defeated Mika Nagano by unanimous decision in the main event.

Ishioka got her first TKO victory against Hanako Kobayashi at Jewels 2nd Ring on February 4, 2009.

Ishioka then challenged the world's number one ranked female fighter Megumi Fujii. On July 11, 2009, Fujii submitted Ishioka by armbar at Jewels 4th Ring.

On December 11, 2009 at Jewels 6th Ring, Ishioka defeated Sally Krumdiack with a controversial finish in which Ishioka had Krumdiack in a weak armbar and the referee asked Krumdiack if she was okay. Krumdiack responded that she was, but the referee mistook the answer and incorrectly stopped the fight. Ringside officials recognized the mistake and it was expected that the fight would be ruled a no contest, but the result remained as a victory for Ishioka.

Ishioka got another victory at Jewels 8th Ring when she defeated pro-wrestler Mai Ichii by submission (armbar) on May 23, 2010.

In an upset on July 31, 2010 in the opening round of the 2010 Jewels Lightweight Queen Tournament, Ishioka was defeated by unanimous decision in her bout against Sakura Nomura, eliminating the favorite Ishioka from the tournament.

Ishioka and Celine Haga fought on October 10, 2010 at Jewels 10th Ring, with Ishioka winning a close but unanimous decision.

Ishioka faced Yuko "Amiba" Oya in a Jewels Lightweight Queen Tournament reserve match at Jewels 11th Ring on December 17, 2010. She defeated Oya by submission due to an armbar in the first round.

Ishioka rematched Seo Hee Ham on February 25, 2011 at DEEP: 52 Impact in Tokyo, Japan. She was defeated for the second time by unanimous decision.

Ishioka next faced Yuka Tsuji in a Jewels vs. Valkyrie bout at Jewels 15th Ring on July 9, 2011 in Tokyo, Japan. She was defeated by unanimous decision.

Ishioka faced "Windy" Tomomi Sunaba in Sunaba's retirement bout at Pancrase Progress Tour 3 on March 11, 2012. She defeated Sunaba by armbar submission in the second round.

After giving birth, Ishioka was scheduled to return to MMA on February 16, 2014, but her match had to be canceled when her opponent, Mika Nagano, announced her pregnancy.

== Shoot boxing career ==
Ishioka had her first shoot boxing match on May 16, 2009, defeating Kanako Oka by unanimous decision at Jewels 3rd Ring.

Ishioka then participated in the 2009 Shoot Boxing Girls S-Cup on August 23, 2009, where she defeated Ai Takahashi by unanimous decision and lost against tournament winner Rena Kubota by TKO (corner stoppage, towel thrown in).

== Other activities ==
Ishioka won the All-Japan RF Karate Championships -52 kg in 2007 and in 2009.

Ishioka has participated in a few grappling matches. The first one at Smackgirl Grappling Queen Tournament 2007 on September 24, 2007, where she was defeated via decision (0-2) by Yasuko Mogi. At Deep X 02 on December 2, 2007, Ishioka defeated Miki Aeba by armbar. On August 31, 2008, Ishioka was defeated by Kyoko Abe with an armbar submission at Gi Grappling 2008 during the first round of the Gi Grappling 2008 Queen Tournament expert -52.0 kg. Ishioka faced Jewels champion Ayaka Hamasaki in a grappling match at Jewels 14th Ring on May 14, 2011. She was defeated by split decision.

== Personal life ==
On July 13, 2012, Ishioka announced that she was expecting a baby and would marry a fellow karateka from Zendokai.

== Mixed martial arts record ==
Professional record breakdown
26 matches	15 wins	11 losses
By knockout	1	0
By submission	9	4
By decision	5	7

Res.	Record	Opponent	Method	Event	Date	Round	Time	Location	Notes
Loss	15-12	Miyuu Yamamoto	Decision (split)	Rizin 11	July 29, 2018	3	5:00	Saitama, Japan	
Loss	15-11	Kanna Asakura	Decision (unanimous)	Deep Jewels 17	August 26, 2017	3	5:00	Tokyo, Japan	Qualification for 2017 Rizin Super Atomweight Grand Prix.
Won	15-10	Bestare Kicaj	Submission (rear naked choke)	Rizin FF 5: Sakura	April 16, 2017	1	2:12	Yokohama, Japan	
Loss	14-10	Mina Kurobe	Decision (unanimous)	Deep-Jewels 14	November 2, 2016	3	5:00	Tokyo, Japan	
Win	14-9	Hana Date	Submission (Armbar)	Deep-Jewels 12	June 5, 2016	1	4:39	Tokyo, Japan	
Loss	13-9	Emi Tomimatsu	Submission (rear naked choke)	Deep-Jewels 11	March 5, 2016	2	4:49	Tokyo, Japan	
Loss	13-8	Seo Hee Ham	Submission (armbar)	Deep-Jewels 6	November 3, 2014	2	2:43	Tokyo, Japan	For the Deep Jewels Featherweight (106 lbs) Championship
Win	13-7	Satomi Takano	Technical Submission (armbar)	Deep-Jewels 4	May 18, 2014	1	4:44	Tokyo, Japan	
Win	12-7	Tomomi Sunaba	Submission (armbar)	Pancrase - Progress Tour 3	March 11, 2012	2	1:04	Tokyo, Japan	Sunaba's retirement fight
Loss	11-7	Yuka Tsuji	Decision (unanimous)	Jewels 15th Ring	July 9, 2011	2	5:00	Tokyo, Japan	
Loss	11-6	Seo Hee Ham	Decision (unanimous)	Deep: 52 Impact	February 25, 2011	2	5:00	Tokyo, Japan	
Win	11-5	Yuko Oya	Submission (armbar)	Jewels 11th Ring	December 17, 2010	1	2:14	Tokyo, Japan	Jewels Lightweight Queen Tournament reserve bout
Win	10-5	Celine Haga	Decision (unanimous)	Jewels 10th Ring	October 10, 2010	2	5:00	Tokyo, Japan	
Loss	9-5	Sakura Nomura	Decision (unanimous)	Jewels 9th Ring	July 31, 2010	2	5:00	Tokyo, Japan	Jewels Lightweight Queen Tournament first round
Win	9-4	Mai Ichii	Submission (armbar)	Jewels 8th Ring	May 23, 2010	2	2:41	Tokyo, Japan	
Win	8-4	Sally Krumdiack	Technical submission (armbar)	Jewels 6th Ring	December 11, 2009	1	2:45	Tokyo, Japan	
Loss	7-4	Megumi Fujii	Submission (armbar)	Jewels 4th Ring	July 11, 2009	2	4:17	Tokyo, Japan	
Win	7-3	Hanako Kobayashi	TKO (punches)	Jewels 2nd Ring	February 4, 2009	1	2:20	Tokyo, Japan	
Win	6-3	Mika Nagano	Decision (unanimous)	Jewels 1st Ring	November 16, 2008	2	5:00	Tokyo, Japan	
Win	5-3	Harumi	Submission (armbar)	Kingdom of Grapple mini Live in Summerfest!! '08	August 6, 2008	1	2:45	Tokyo, Japan	
Loss	4-3	Seo Hee Ham	Decision (unanimous)	Smackgirl World ReMix Tournament 2008 Opening Round	February 14, 2008	2	5:00	Tokyo, Japan	Lightweight tournament first round
Win	4-2	Thricia Poovey	Submission (armbar)	Smackgirl 7th Anniversary: Starting Over	December 26, 2007	1	4:18	Tokyo, Japan	
Win	3-2	Miyuki Ariga	Decision (unanimous)	Kingdom of Grapple Live 2007	November 25, 2007	2	5:00	Tokyo, Japan	Special rules
Win	2-2	Masako Yoshida	Decision (unanimous)	Smackgirl 2007: Queens' Hottest Summer	September 6, 2007	2	5:00	Tokyo, Japan	
Loss	1-2	Mei Yamaguchi	Submission (kneebar)	Smackgirl - F 2007: The Next Cinderella Tournament 2007 Second Stage	May 19, 2007	2	1:24	Tokyo, Japan	The Next Cinderella Tournament 2007 lightweight tournament semi-finals
Win	1-1	Yoko Oyama	Decision (unanimous)	Smackgirl 2007: The Dance of the Taisho Romance	April 28, 2007	2	5:00	Osaka, Japan	The Next Cinderella Tournament 2007 lightweight tournament first round
Loss	0-1	Kyoko Takabayashi	Decision (unanimous)	Smackgirl - F 2007: The Next Cinderella Tournament 2007 First Stage	March 11, 2007	2	5:00	Tokyo, Japan	

== Kickboxing record ==
3 fights, 2 wins, 1 loss
Date	Result	Opponent	Event	Location	Method	Round	Time	Record	Notes
August 23, 2009	Loss	Rena Kubota	Shoot Boxing Girls Tournament 2009	Tokyo, Japan	TKO (corner stoppage)	3	0:20	2-1-0	Shoot boxing rules. 2009 Girls S-Cup semi-final
August 23, 2009	Win	Ai Takahashi	Shoot Boxing Girls Tournament 2009	Tokyo, Japan	Decision (unanimous)	3	2:00	2-0-0	Shoot boxing rules. 2009 Girls S-Cup quarterfinal
May 16, 2009	Win	Kanako Oka	Jewels 3rd Ring	Tokyo, Japan	Decision (unanimous)	3	2:00	1-0-0	Shoot boxing rules

Legend: Win Loss Draw/No contest

== Championships and accomplishments ==
- All-Japan RF Karate Championships -52 kg in 2007
- All-Japan RF Karate Championships -52 kg in 2009

== See also ==
- List of female mixed martial artists
- List of female kickboxers
