= Momoka =

- Gender: Female

Origin
- Origin: Japanese
- Meaning: Different meanings depending on the kanji used

Momoka (written: 杏果, 百夏, 桃花 or 桃華) is a feminine Japanese given name. Notable people with the name include:

- Momoka Akashi (明石 百夏; born 1981), Japanese popular music artist
- Momoka Ariyasu (有安 杏果; born 1995), Japanese singer and photographer
- Momoka Cinderella (桃花・シンデレラ; born 2007), Japanese kickboxer
- Momoka Hanazono (花園 桃花; born 1999), Japanese professional wrestler
- Momoka Horikawa (堀川 桃香; born 2003), Japanese speed skater
- Momoka Ito (伊藤 萌々香; born 1997), Japanese former idol from Fairies (Japanese group)
- Momoka Kinoshita (木下 桃香; born 2003), Japanese footballer
- Momoka Kobori (born 1999), New Zealand golfer
- Momoka Kodakari (小鷹狩 百花; born 1999), Japanese former idol from Cheeky Parade
- Momoka Muraoka (村岡 桃佳; born 1997), Japanese woman para-alpine skier
- Momoka Nakajima (中嶋 桃花; born 2000), Japanese idol from E-girls
- Momoka Nishina (仁科 百華; born 1990), Japanese former AV actress
- Momoka Sumitani (隅谷 百花; born 2004), Japanese idol from Girls²
- Momoka Terasawa (寺澤 百花), Japanese voice actress
- Momoka Yamada (山田 杏佳; born 2006), Japanese idol from ≒Joy

Fictional characters:

- Momoka Kawakabe (川壁桃花), a main female character in the anime series Touka Gettan
- Momoka Kawaragi (河原木 桃香), a main character and lead guitarist of the fictional band Togenashi Togeari in Girls Band Cry
- Momoka Nishizawa (西澤 桃華), character in the manga series Keroro Gunso
- Momoka Aino (愛乃モモカ), character from Magical x Heroine Magimajo Pures!
- Momoka Yashiro (ヤシロ・モモカ), character from Gundam Build Divers
