= Hitomi Akano =

Japanese mixed martial artist

- Born: 27 July 1974 (age 52); Osaka, Japan
- Other names: Girlfight Monster
- Height: 5 ft 4 in (163 cm)
- Weight: 135 lb (61 kg; 9 st 9 lb)
- Reach: 61 in (155 cm)
- Style: Judo
- Fighting out of: Tokyo, Japan
- Team: Abe Ani Combat Club

Mixed martial arts record
- Total: 28
- Wins: 18
- By submission: 14
- By decision: 4
- Losses: 10
- By knockout: 1
- By submission: 1
- By decision: 8

Other information
- Mixed martial arts record from Sherdog

Hitomi Akano (赤野 仁美, Akano Hitomi; born 27 July 1974) is a retired Japanese female mixed martial artist. She announced her formal retirement from MMA on 1 August 2013.

Akano used a song she penned herself called "Between the Sky" as her entrance music. She is a former Smackgirl Middleweight Champion at 128 pounds (58 kg).

== Mixed martial arts career ==
Akano made her mixed martial arts debut on November 26, 2004 against veteran Megumi Yabushita. Akano went into the fight with a broken foot, unwilling to pull out of the fight beforehand. She was defeated by Unanimous Decision.

On August 17, 2005, Akano submitted Takayo Hashi at 1:19 of the first round at Smackgirl – Dynamic !!

Akano faced Tara LaRosa at MFC – USA vs. Russia 3 on June 3, 2006. She lost the fight by Unanimous Decision.

She faced Molly Helsel at Smackgirl – Women Hold Their Ground on September 15, 2006. She won the fight by armbar submission in the second round and became the second Smackgirl Middleweight (128-Pound) Champion.

On April 14, 2007, Akano faced Amanda Buckner at BodogFight – Clash of the Nations. She was defeated by Unanimous Decision.

Akano battled Takayo Hashi for the second time at Smackgirl – Queen's Hottest Summer on September 6, 2007. She was defeated by Unanimous Decision and lost the Smackgirl Middleweight Championship.

Akano fought Vanessa Porto at FFF 3 – War of the Roses on November 3, 2007. She lost the fight by Split Decision.

Akano rematched Megumi Yabushita in the opening round of the 2008 Smackgirl World ReMix Grand Prix. She defeated Yabushita with a heel hook in the second round.

Akano advanced to the finals of the ReMix tournament by submitting Hiroko Yamanaka on April 25, 2008, but Smackgirl closed its doors soon after and was later renamed Jewels.

On November 16, 2008, Akano submitted Mika Harigai with an armbar in just 38 seconds at Jewels 1st Ring.

Akano faced Cris Cyborg at Strikeforce: Shamrock vs. Diaz on April 11, 2009. Cyborg came in six pounds overweight for the fight. Akano originally rejected the fight due to Cyborg failing to make weight but later accepted the fight. She lost the fight by TKO due to strikes in the third round.

Following the Strikeforce bout, Akano returned to Japan and faced Miki Morifuji at Jewels 4th Ring. She defeated Morifuji by armbar in the second round.

Akano faced Hiroko Yamanaka for the second time at Jewels 7th Ring on March 19, 2010. She lost the fight by Split Decision.

Akano was part of the one-night Strikeforce 135-pound women's tournament on August 13, 2010 at Strikeforce Challengers: Riggs vs. Taylor. A random drawing was held on the day of the weigh-ins to determine first-round matchups and Akano faced Carina Damm in the opening round of the tournament.

Akano submitted Damm with a triangle armbar in the second round to advance to the tournament final. She faced Miesha Tate and was defeated by Unanimous Decision.

Akano was scheduled to face Roxanne Modafferi at World Victory Road Presents: Soul of Fight on December 30, 2010, but the fight was cancelled after Modafferi suffered a stomach illness and was unable to compete.

Akano faced Chisa Yonezawa at Pancrase Impressive Tour 2 on March 13, 2011 in Osaka, Japan. She defeated Yonezawa by armbar submission in just 40 seconds.

Akano then faced Roxanne Modafferi in a bout rescheduled for Jewels 15th Ring on July 9, 2011. She defeated Modafferi by Unanimous Decision.

Akano faced Olympian Sara McMann at ProElite 3 on January 21, 2012. She was defeated by unanimous decision.

Akano faced Alexis Davis at Invicta Fighting Championships 2 on July 28, 2012. She was defeated by submission due to a rear-naked choke in the second round.

It was announced on August 2, that Akano has retired from the sport of MMA.

== Mixed martial arts record ==
Professional record breakdown
| 28 matches | 18 wins | 10 losses |
| By knockout | 0 | 1 |
| By submission | 14 | 1 |
| By decision | 4 | 8 |

| Res. | Record | Opponent | Method | Event | Date | Round | Time | Location | Notes |
|---|---|---|---|---|---|---|---|---|---|
| Loss | 18–10 | Alexis Davis | Submission (rear-naked choke) | Invicta FC 2: Baszler vs. McMann | July 28, 2012 | 2 | 3:41 | Kansas City, Kansas, U.S. | |
| Loss | 18–9 | Sara McMann | Decision (unanimous) | ProElite 3: Grove vs. Minowa | January 21, 2012 | 3 | 5:00 | Honolulu, Hawaii, U.S. | |
| Win | 18–8 | Roxanne Modafferi | Decision (unanimous) | Jewels 15th Ring | July 9, 2011 | 2 | 5:00 | Tokyo, Japan | |
| Win | 17–8 | Chisa Yonezawa | Submission (armbar) | Pancrase: Impressive Tour 2 | March 13, 2011 | 1 | 0:40 | Osaka, Japan | |
| Loss | 16–8 | Miesha Tate | Decision (unanimous) | Strikeforce Challengers: Riggs vs. Taylor | August 13, 2010 | 3 | 3:00 | Phoenix, Arizona, U.S. | Final of Women's 135 lb tournament |
| Win | 16–7 | Carina Damm | Submission (triangle armbar) | Strikeforce Challengers: Riggs vs. Taylor | August 13, 2010 | 2 | 1:48 | Phoenix, Arizona, U.S. | Semi-final of Women's 135 lb tournament |
| Loss | 15–7 | Hiroko Yamanaka | Decision (split) | Jewels 7th Ring | March 19, 2010 | 2 | 5:00 | Tokyo, Japan | |
| Win | 15–6 | Miki Morifuji | Technical submission (straight armbar) | Jewels 4th Ring | July 11, 2009 | 2 | 4:17 | Tokyo, Japan | |
| Loss | 14–6 | Cris Cyborg | TKO (punches) | Strikeforce: Shamrock vs. Diaz | April 11, 2009 | 3 | 0:35 | San Jose, California, U.S. | Catchweight bout due to Cyborg missing weight |
| Win | 14–5 | Mika Harigai | Submission (armbar) | Jewels 1st Ring | November 16, 2008 | 1 | 0:38 | Tokyo, Japan | |
| Win | 13–5 | Hiroko Yamanaka | Submission (armbar) | Smackgirl: World Remix Tournament Semifinal | April 26, 2008 | 2 | 3:10 | Tokyo, Japan | |
| Win | 12–5 | Megumi Yabushita | Submission (heel hook) | Smackgirl: World ReMix Tournament Opening | February 14, 2008 | 2 | 4:16 | Tokyo, Japan | |
| Loss | 11–5 | Vanessa Porto | Decision (split) | FFF 3: War of the Roses | November 3, 2007 | 5 | 3:00 | Ontario, California, U.S. | |
| Loss | 11–4 | Takayo Hashi | Decision (unanimous) | Smackgirl: Queen's Hottest Summer | September 6, 2007 | 3 | 5:00 | Tokyo, Japan | Lost Smackgirl Middleweight Championship |
| Win | 11–3 | Liz Posener | Submission (armbar) | Smackgirl: The Queen Said The USA Is Strongest | May 19, 2007 | 2 | 0:52 | Tokyo, Japan | |
| Loss | 10–3 | Amanda Buckner | Decision (unanimous) | BodogFight: Clash of the Nations | April 14, 2007 | 3 | 5:00 | Saint Petersburg, Russia | |
| Win | 10–2 | Keiko Tamai | Submission (armbar) | MARS: BodogFight | October 4, 2006 | 2 | 4:48 | Tokyo, Japan | |
| Win | 9–2 | Molly Helsel | Submission (armbar) | Smackgirl: Women Hold Their Ground | September 15, 2006 | 2 | 1:32 | Tokyo, Japan | Won Smackgirl Middleweight Championship |
| Win | 8–2 | Emma Bush | Decision (unanimous) | Smackgirl: Top Girl Battle | June 30, 2006 | 2 | 5:00 | Tokyo, Japan | |
| Loss | 7–2 | Tara LaRosa | Decision (unanimous) | M-1 Mixfight: USA vs Russia 3 | June 3, 2006 | 3 | 5:00 | Atlantic City, New Jersey, U.S. | |
| Win | 7–1 | Debi Purcell | Decision (unanimous) | Smackgirl: Advent of Goddess | February 15, 2006 | 2 | 5:00 | Tokyo, Japan | |
| Win | 6–1 | Keiko Tamai | Submission (armbar) | G-Shooto: G-Shooto 03 | December 17, 2005 | 1 | 1:27 | Tokyo, Japan | |
| Win | 5–1 | Asako Saioka | Decision (unanimous) | Smackgirl: Shimokita Experiment League | October 15, 2005 | 2 | 5:00 | Tokyo, Japan | |
| Win | 4–1 | Takayo Hashi | Submission (armbar) | Smackgirl: Dynamic !! | August 17, 2005 | 1 | 1:19 | Tokyo, Japan | |
| Win | 3–1 | Kinuka Sasaki | Submission (armbar) | Smackgirl: The Next Cinderella 2005 Second Stage | July 10, 2005 | 1 | 3:58 | Tokyo, Japan | |
| Win | 2–1 | Seri Saito | Submission (armbar) | Smackgirl: The Next Cinderella 2005 First Stage | April 29, 2005 | 2 | 1:25 | Tokyo, Japan | |
| Win | 1–1 | Mika Harigai | Submission (armbar) | Smackgirl: Refresh 2005 | January 8, 2005 | 1 | 2:29 | Tokyo, Japan | |
| Loss | 0–1 | Megumi Yabushita | Decision (unanimous) | G-Shooto: G-Shooto 01 | November 26, 2004 | 2 | 5:00 | Tokyo, Japan | |

== Championships ==
- 2007 Smackgirl Middleweight Champion
- 2006 Smackgirl Middleweight Champion
- 1999 Grand Prix Città di Roma (U63) (Silver)
- 1999 ASKO World Tournament Leonding (U63) (Silver)

== See also ==
List of female mixed martial artists
