= Smackgirl =

MMA promoter based in Japan

- Company type: Private
- Industry: Mixed martial arts promotion
- Predecessor: ReMix
- Founded: May 2001
- Defunct: October 2008
- Fate: Transformed into Jewels
- Successor: Jewels
- Headquarters: Japan
- Area served: Japan
- Key people: Motoki Shino (president); Koichiro Kimura (founder)
- Parent: Kilgore
- Website: (Internet archive)

Smackgirl was a Japanese mixed martial arts promotion focused solely on female fighters. The promotion also held grappling and amateur events along with its main line of professional MMA cards. After financial difficulties throughout 2008 the promotion was sold to Marverous Japan Co., Ltd. and rebranded JEWELS.

Unlike conventional MMA in Japan, Smackgirl did not allow striking to the head while in a grounded position. There was also a 30-second limit for ground fighting but it was abolished by 2008. There were four weight classes: flyweight (under 48 kg), lightweight (under 52 kg), middleweight (under 58 kg), and openweight (no limit).

Before being Smackgirl, the ReMix banner was used and held its first event in December 5, 2000. After another event with the ReMix brand, the promotion morphed into Smackgirl in May 2001.

== Rules ==
=== Weight classes ===
- Flyweight (-48 kg (105.8 lb; 7.6 st))
- Lightweight (-53 kg (116.8 lb; 8.3 st))
- Middleweight (-58 kg (127.9 lb; 9.1 st))
- Open weight

== Former champions ==
=== Openweight Championship ===
Weight limit: Unlimited

No.	Name	Event	Date	Defenses
1	(Japan) Megumi Yabushita def. Erin Toughill	Smackgirl: World ReMix 2004; Shizuoka, Japan	Dec 19, 2004	
2	(United States) Amanda Buckner	Smackgirl 2006: Advent of Goddess; Tokyo, Japan	Feb 15, 2006	
Buckner relinquished the title on May 15, 2007.
3	(Japan) Yoko Takahashi def. Alicia Mena	Smackgirl 2007: The Queen Said The USA is The Strongest; Tokyo, Japan	May 19, 2007	
4	(Japan) Hiroko Yamanaka	Smackgirl: Queen’s Hottest Summer; Tokyo, Japan	Sep 6, 2007	

=== Middleweight Championship ===
Weight limit: 58 kg (127.9 lb)

No.	Name	Event	Date	Defenses
1	(United States) Laura D'Auguste def. Tevi Say	Smackgirl; Japan	Aug 17, 2005	
D'Auguste relinquished the title on September 1, 2006.
2	(Japan) Hitomi Akano def. Molly Helsel	Smackgirl: Women Hold Their Ground; Tokyo, Japan	Sep 15, 2006	
3	(Japan) Takayo Hashi	Smackgirl: Queen’s Hottest Summer; Tokyo, Japan	Sep 6, 2007	

=== Lightweight Championship ===
Weight limit: 53 kg (116.8 lb)

No.	Name	Event	Date	Defenses
1	(Japan) Yuka Tsuji def. Hisae Watanabe	Smackgirl: Road to Dynamic!! Tokyo, Japan	Jun 28, 2005	1. def. Maiko Ohkada at Smackgirl: Dynamic!! on Aug 17, 2005; 2. def. Cami Hostetler at Smackgirl: Queen’s Triumphant Return on Apr 22, 2006; 3. def. Tomomi Sunaba at Smackgirl: Top Girl Battle on Jun 30, 2006; 4. def. Thricia Poovey at Smackgirl: The Dance of the Taisho Romance on Apr 28, 2007; 5. def. Seo Hee Ham at Smackgirl: Starting Over on Dec 26, 2007

=== Flyweight Championship ===
Weight limit: 48 kg (105.8 lb)

No.	Name	Event	Date	Defenses
1	(Japan) Satoko Shinashi def. Naoko Omuro	Smackgirl: Lightweight Anniversary; Tokyo, Japan	Nov 29, 2005	1. def. Misaki Takimoto at Smackgirl: Will the Queen Paint the Shinjuku Red on Mar 11, 2007

== See also ==
- Jewels
- List of Deep champions
- List of Deep events
- Deep Jewels events
- Jewels (mixed martial arts)
- List of female mixed martial artists
