= Shinjuku Face =

Event hall in Kabukicho, Tokyo, Japan

Coordinates: 35°41′45.32″N 139°42′05.11″E

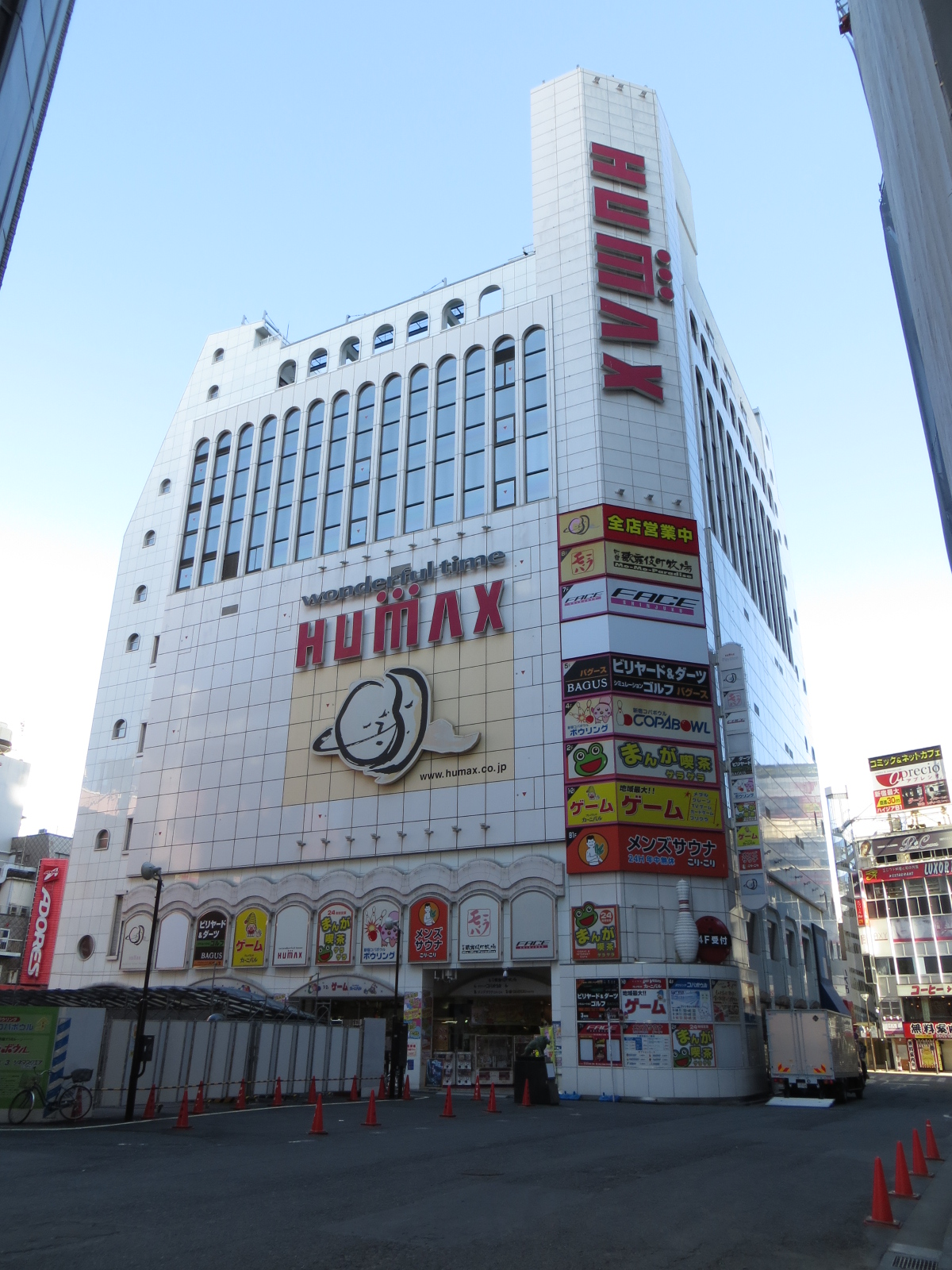
- Interactive map of Shinjuku Face
- Former names: Liquid Room (1994-2004)
- Location: Humax Pavilion Shinjuku 7F, 1-20-1 Kabukicho, Tokyo, Japan
- Operator: Shinjuku Face
- Capacity: 600

Construction
- Opened: July 29, 2005
- Closed: September 30, 2026

Shinjuku Face, (新宿FACE, Shinjuku feisu) stylized as FACE, is an event hall located on the 7th floor of the Humax Pavilion Shinjuku complex, 1-20-1 Kabukicho, Tokyo, Japan. It mainly hosts mixed martial arts, boxing and professional wrestling events. Shinjuku Face has a capacity of approximately 600 people.

== History ==
From 1994 to 2004, the place was used as a live venue known at the time as Liquid Room. Many live concerts were recorded at the venue, such as Jeff Mills' Live at the Liquid Room, Tokyo. In 2004, Liquid Room moved out of Humax Pavilion Shinjuku. The place was renovated as an event hall for sports and re-opened on July 29, 2005.

The hall was officially opened on July 29, 2005, with the first event being a women's martials arts competition called W-FACE.

The venue has also hosted stage shows, such as the musical adaptations of Chargeman Ken!.

Due to the expiration of the fixed-term building lease agreement, Shinjuku Face will close on September 30, 2026.
