= Robot Restaurant =

Entertainment venue

Coordinates: 35.694350°N 139.702857°E

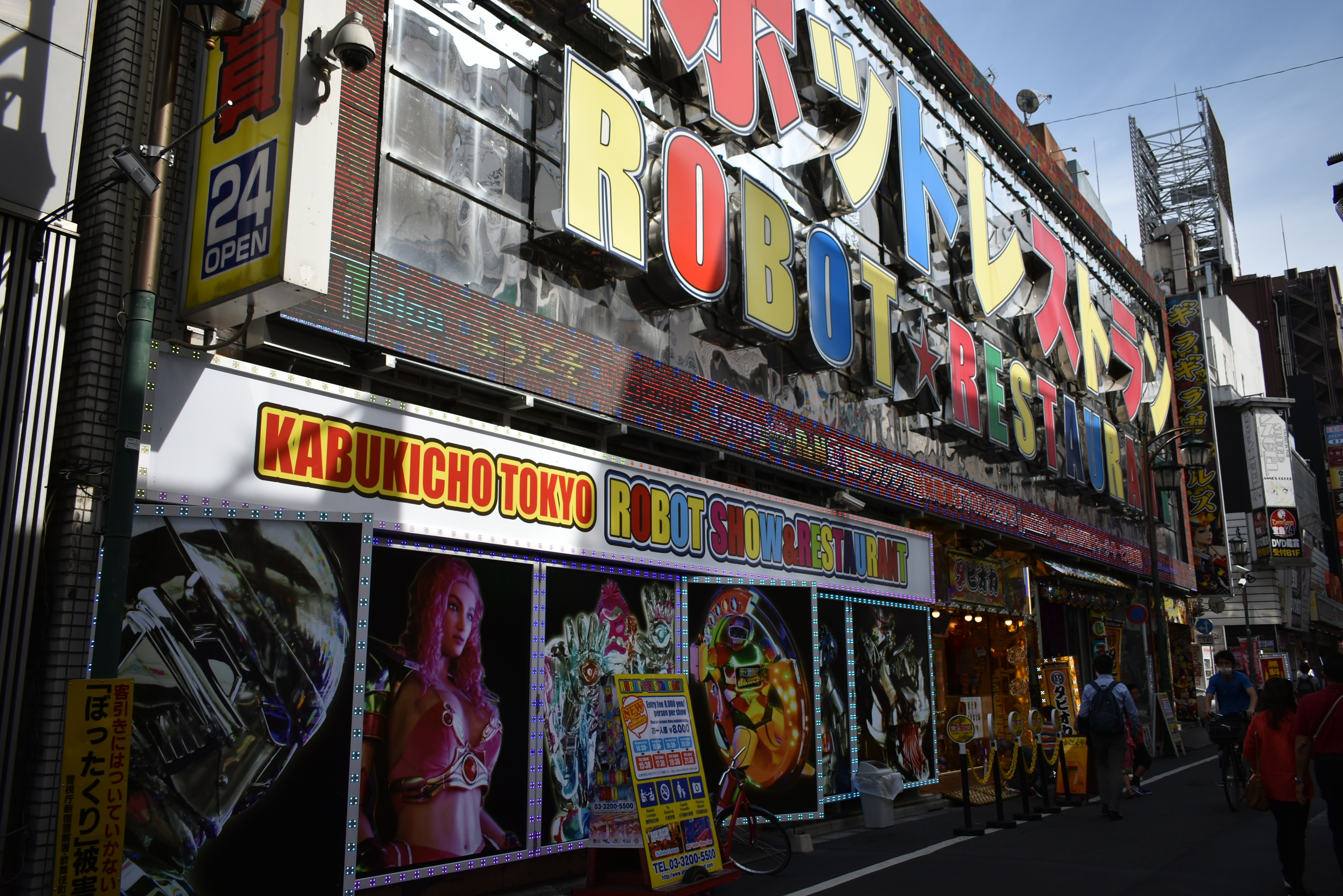
Exterior view

Robot Restaurant was an entertainment venue operated by Robot Restaurant Co., Ltd. located in Kabukicho, Shinjuku, Tokyo. The restaurant offered dinner with a robot show. Due to the COVID-19 pandemic, the restaurant has permanently shut down.

== Overview ==
When it first opened in July 2012, the theme was to "enliven office workers", targeting office workers in Shinjuku with a show featuring female dancers in extreme costumes and robots. Hollywood film directors Tim Burton, J.J. Abrams, and Guillermo del Toro have visited the location.

From there, word-of-mouth spread on social media, leading to an increase in the number of foreign tourists. They subsequently shifted their target audience to foreign tourists, and also had shows that include many elements of Japanese culture. In addition, the mascot character "Roboko" was permanently installed at the storefront as an advertising tower.
