= Shinjuku Golden Gai =

Shinjuku Golden Gai 新宿ゴールデン街
- District in Kabukichō, Shinjuku, Tokyo
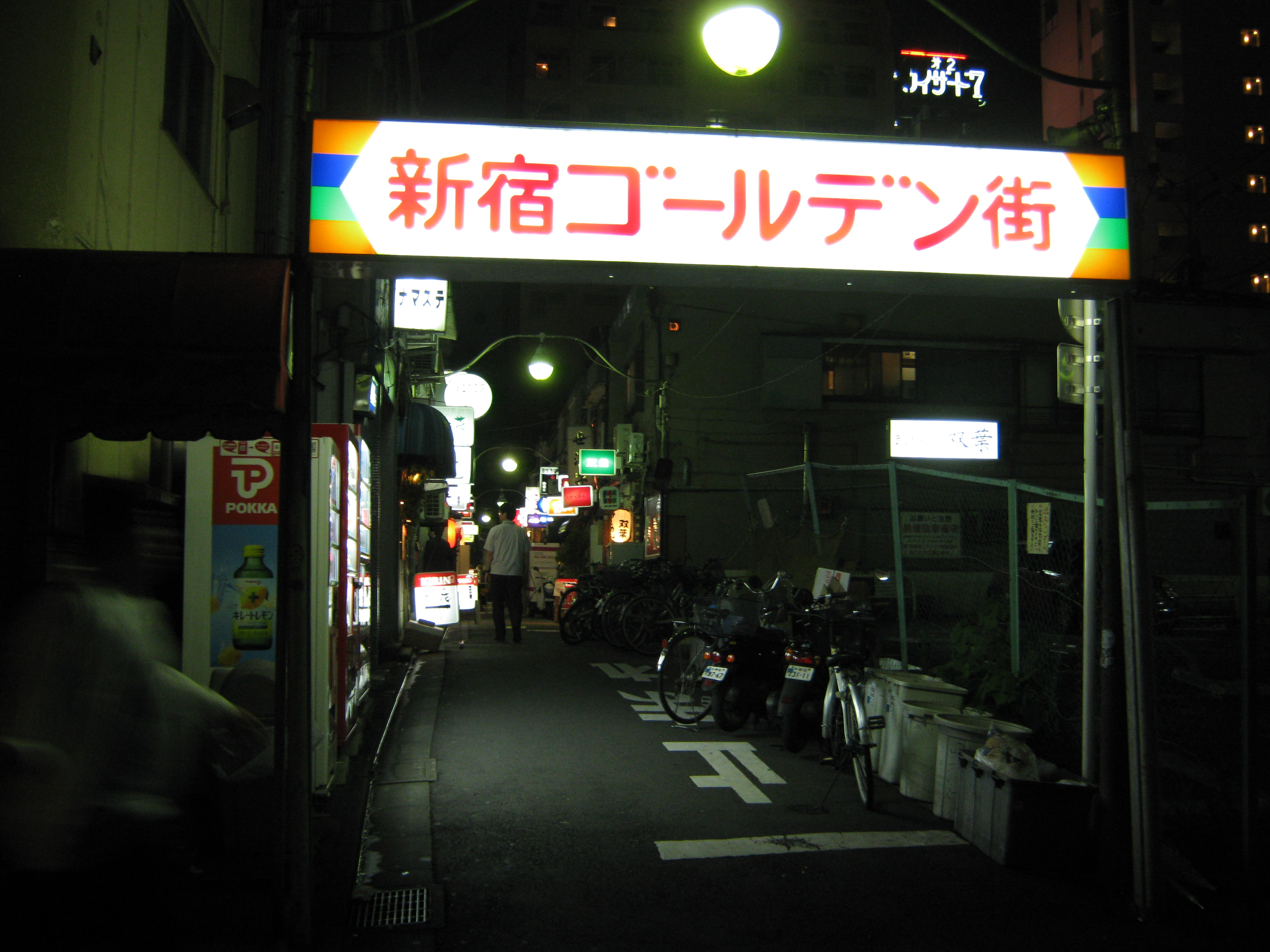
- Entrance gate of Shinjuku Golden Gai

- Location within Special wards of Tokyo Location within Tokyo Location within Japan
- Coordinates: 35°41′38″N 139°42′17″E
- Country: Japan
- Prefecture: Tokyo
- Ward: Shinjuku
- District: Kabukicho

Area
  - Total: 0.661157 ha (1.63375 acres)

Shinjuku Golden Gai (Japanese: 新宿ゴールデン街, Hepburn: Shinjuku gōruden-gai) is a district of Kabukicho within Shinjuku, a special ward of Tokyo, Japan. It is composed of a network of six narrow alleys, connected by even narrower passageways which are about wide enough for a single person to pass through. Over 200 tiny shanty-style bars, clubs and eateries are squeezed into this area.

The alleys are private roads, not public roads. In this area, shooting photographs and video for all purposes on the street is prohibited without permission of the area's business promotion association.

== Streetscape ==
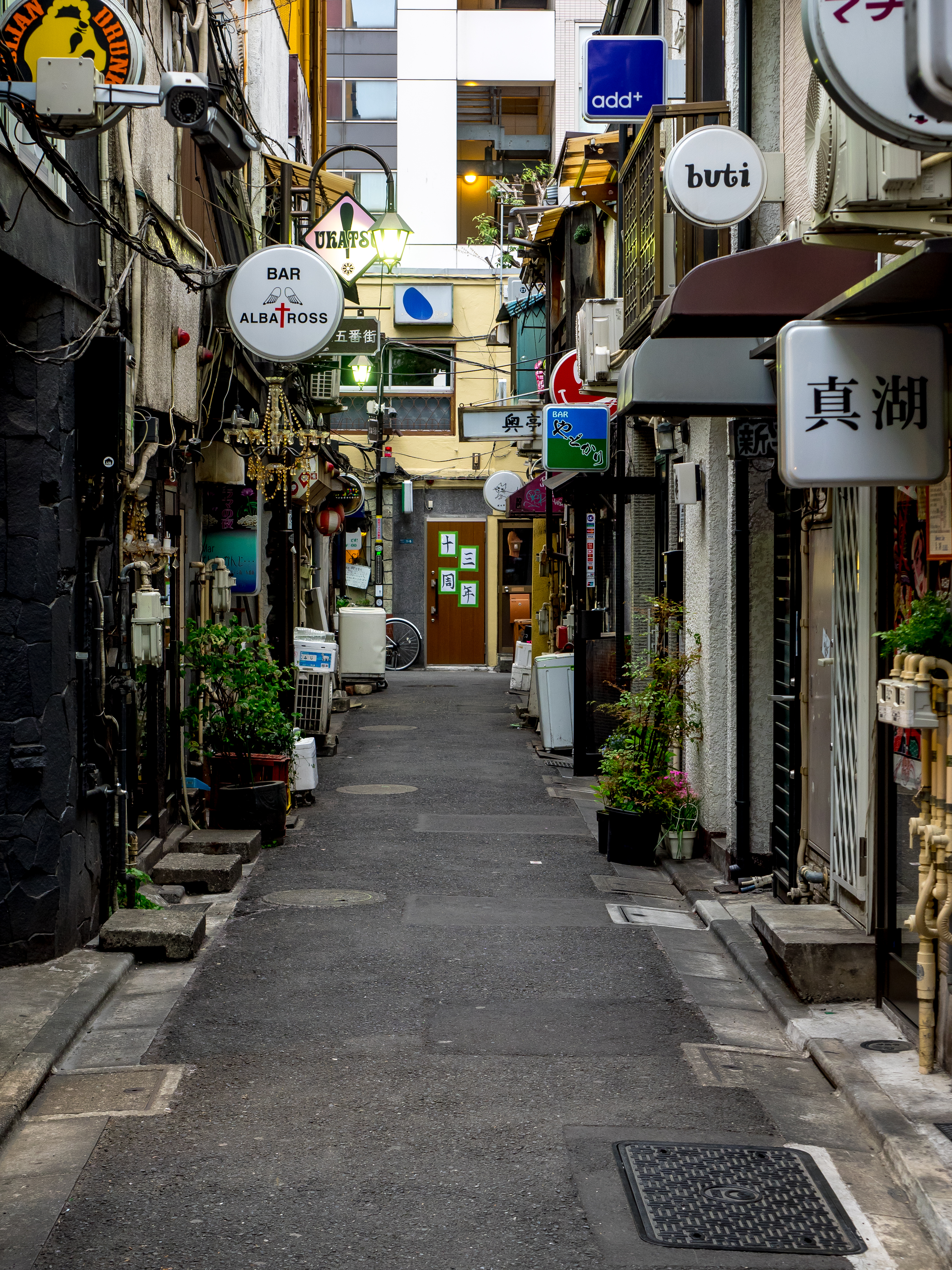
An alley in Golden Gai

Golden Gai is a few minutes' walk from the East Exit of Shinjuku Station, between the Shinjuku City Office and the Hanazono Shrine. Its architectural importance is that it provides a view into the relatively recent past of Tokyo, when large parts of the city resembled present-day Golden Gai, particularly in terms of the extremely narrow lanes and the tiny two-story buildings.

Nowadays, most of the surrounding area has been redeveloped: The street plans have been changed to create much wider roads and larger building plots, and most of the buildings themselves are now much larger high- or medium- rise developments. This has left Golden Gai as one of a decreasing number of examples of the nature of Tokyo before Japan's "economic miracle" that took place in the latter half of the 20th century.

Typically, the buildings are just a few feet wide and are built so close to the ones next door that they nearly touch. Most are two-story, having a small bar at street level and either another bar or a tiny flat upstairs, reached by a steep set of stairs. None of the bars are very large. Some are so small that they can fit only five or so customers at one time. The buildings are generally ramshackle, and the alleys are dimly lit, giving the area a very scruffy and run-down appearance. However, Golden Gai is not a cheap place to drink.

Shinjuku Golden Street Theatre is a tiny theater in one corner of Golden Gai that puts on mainly comedy shows.

== Bars ==
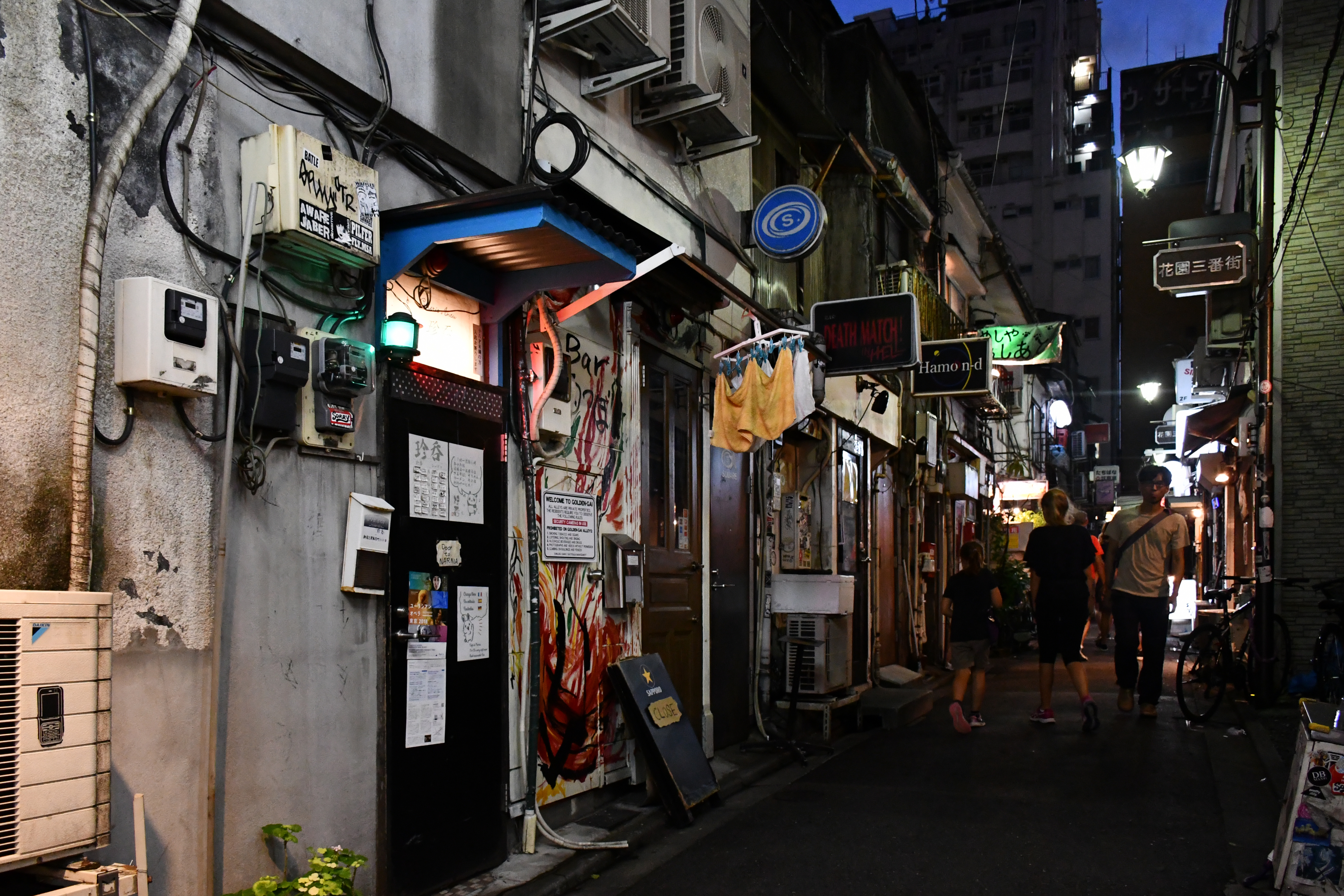
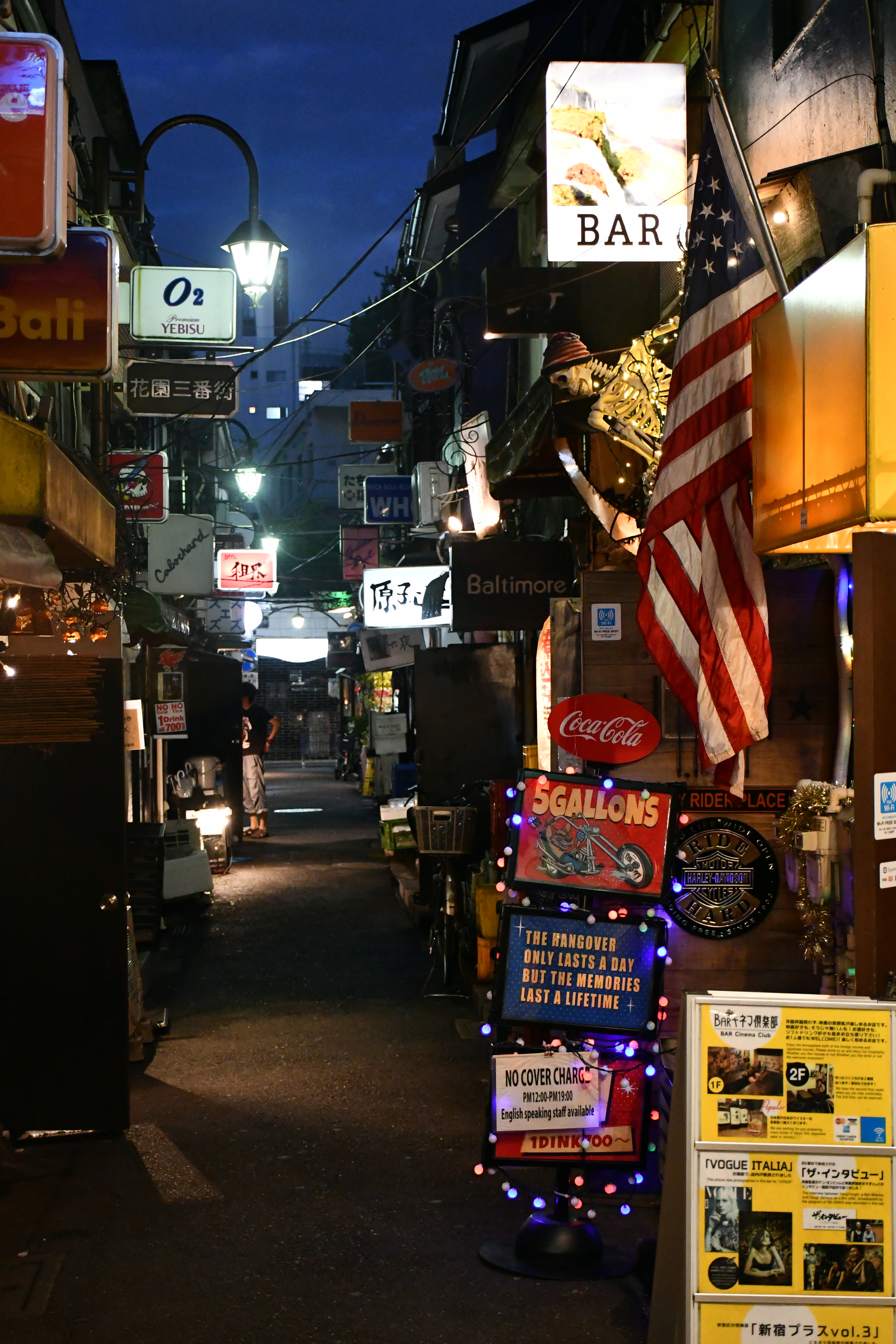
Bars in the alleys of Golden Gai

Bars in Golden Gai are known in particular for the artistic affinities of their patrons. Golden Gai is well known as a meeting place for musicians, artists, directors, writers, academics and actors, including many celebrities. Many of the bars only welcome regular customers, who initially should be introduced by an existing patron, although many others welcome non-regulars, some even making efforts to attract overseas tourists by displaying signs and price lists in English. Some bartenders are foreign.

Many of the bars have a particular theme, such as jazz, R&B, karaoke, punk rock, or flamenco, and their ramshackle walls are sometimes liberally plastered with movie, film and concert posters. Others cater to customers with a particular interest, such as go, exploitation films, or horse racing. Most of the bars don't open until 9:00 or 10:00 p.m., so the area is very quiet during the day and early evening.

== History ==
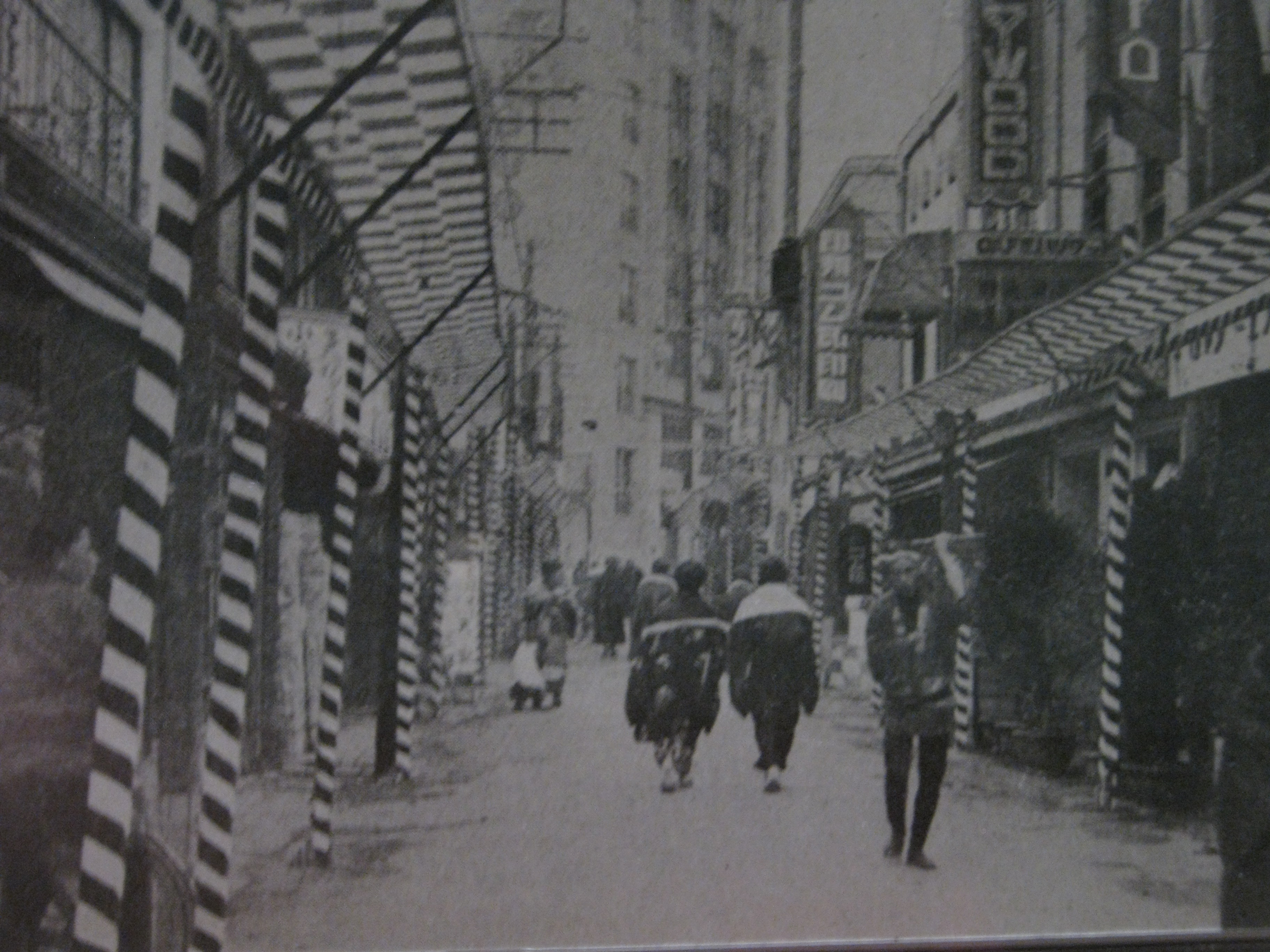
Early Golden Gai

Golden Gai was known for prostitution before 1958, when prostitution became illegal. Since then it has developed as a drinking area, and at least some of the bars can trace their origins back to the 1960s. In the 1980s, many buildings in Tokyo were set on fire by yakuza, so the land could be bought up by developers, but Golden Gai survived because some of its supporters took turns guarding the area at night.

== Gallery ==
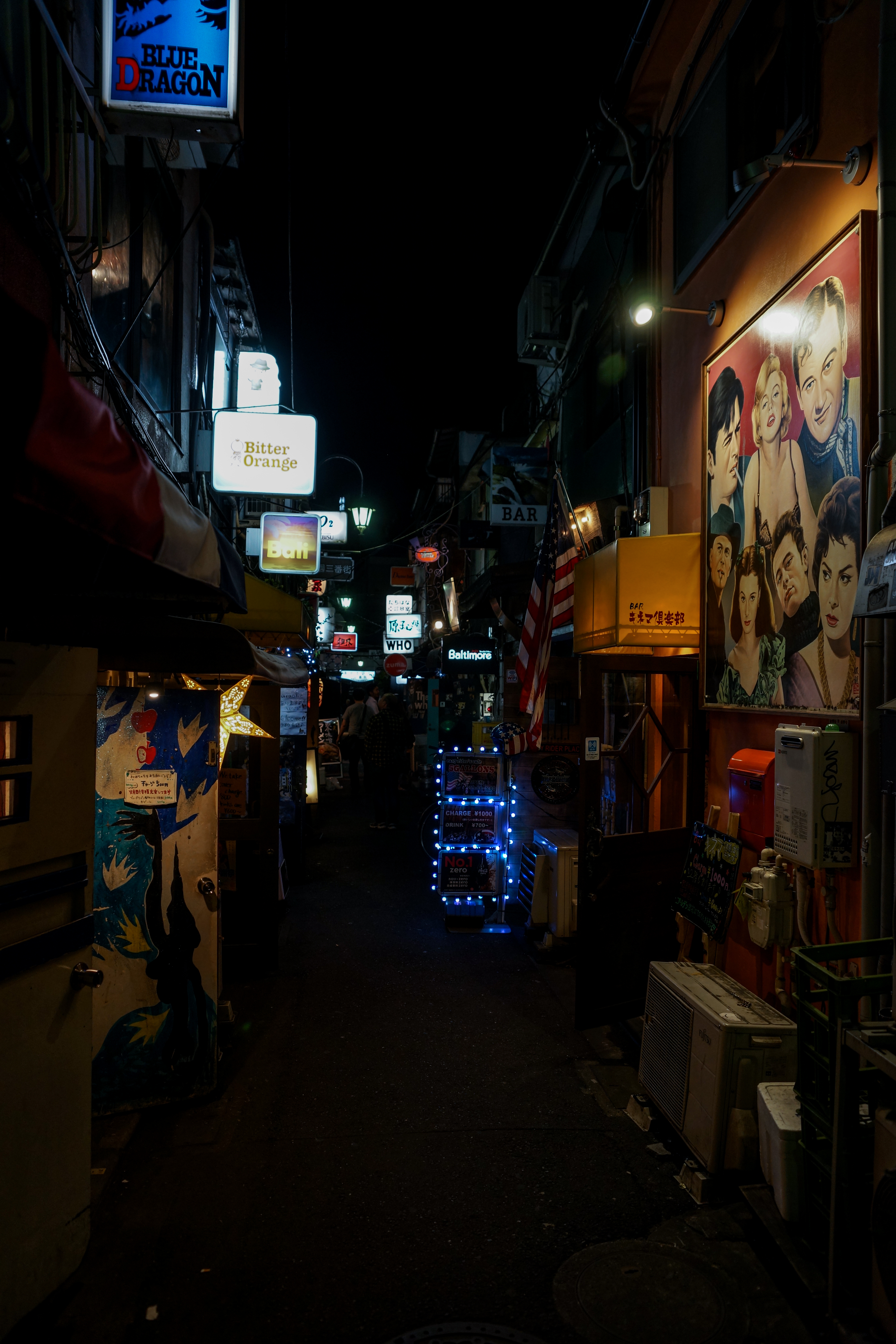
Akarui Hanazono Sanban Street at night

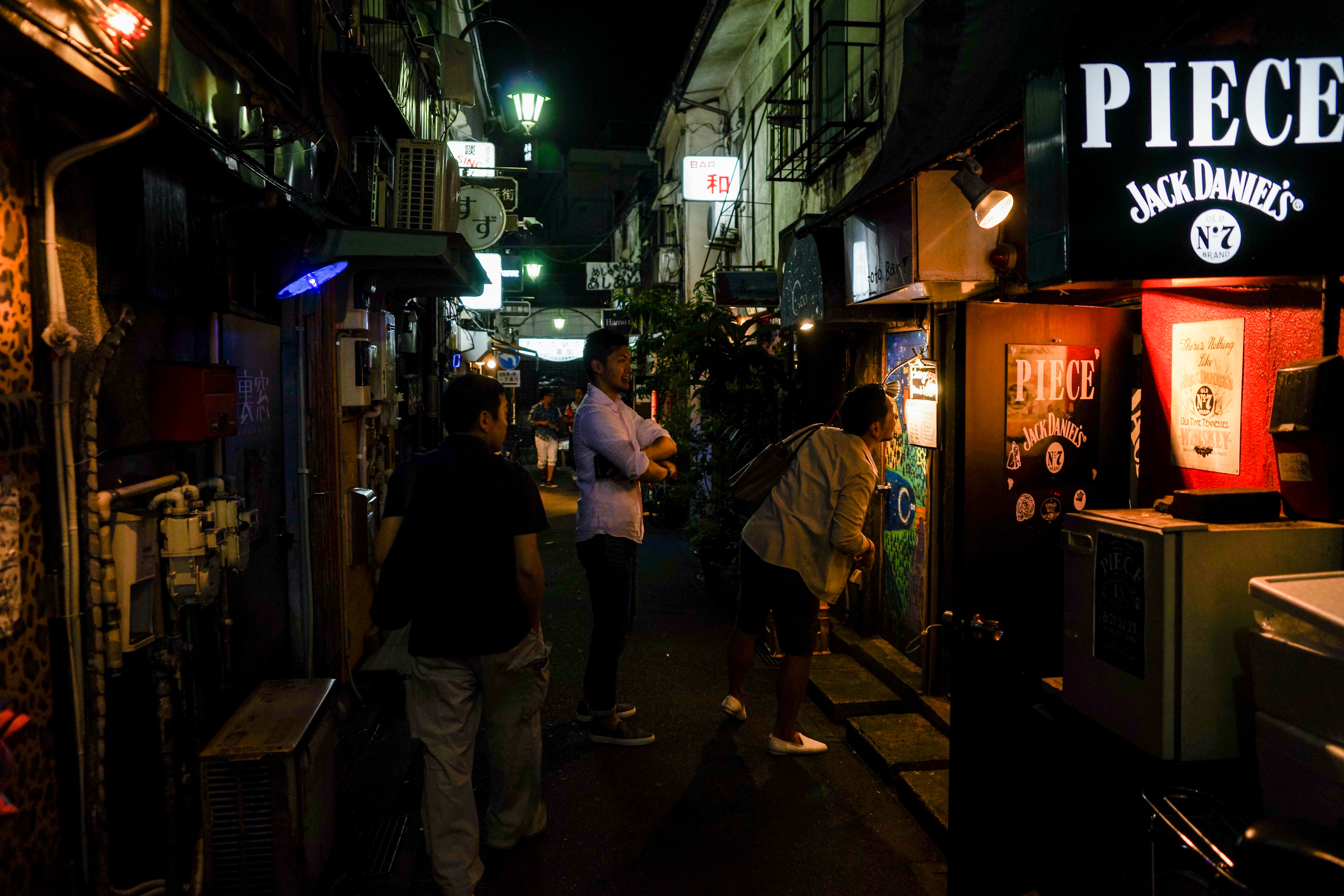
Akarui Hanazono Sanban Street at night

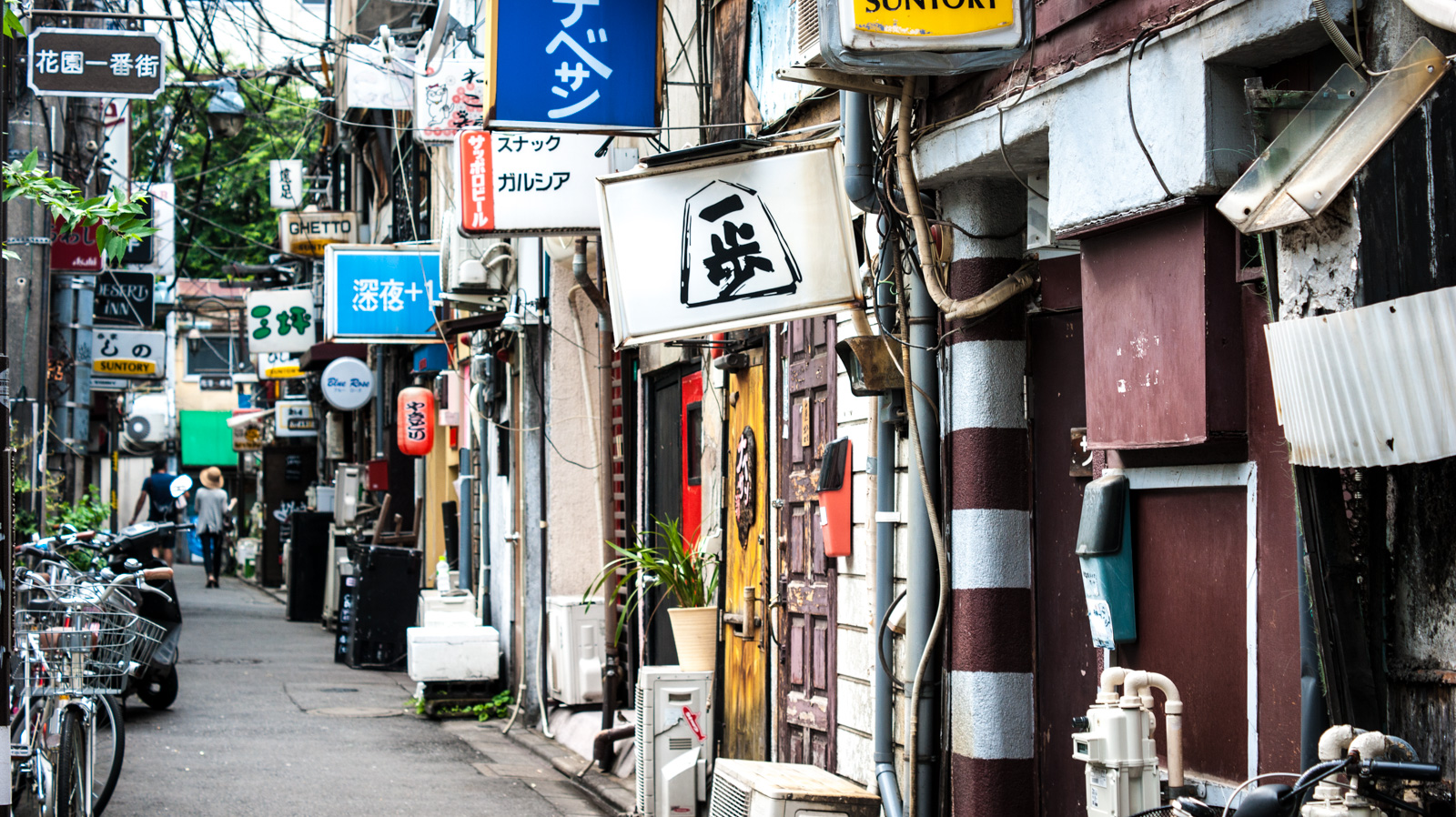
Akarui Hanazono Ichiban Street at morning

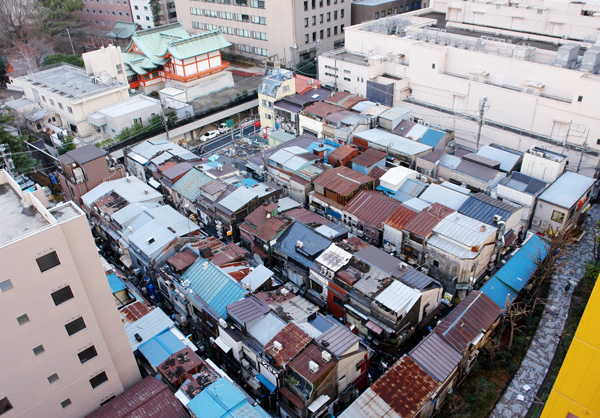
Overhead view

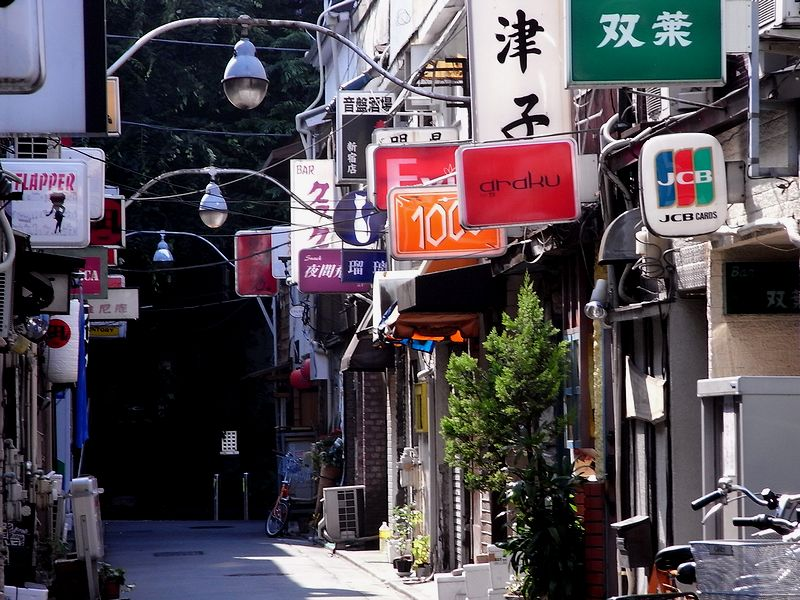
Golden Gai

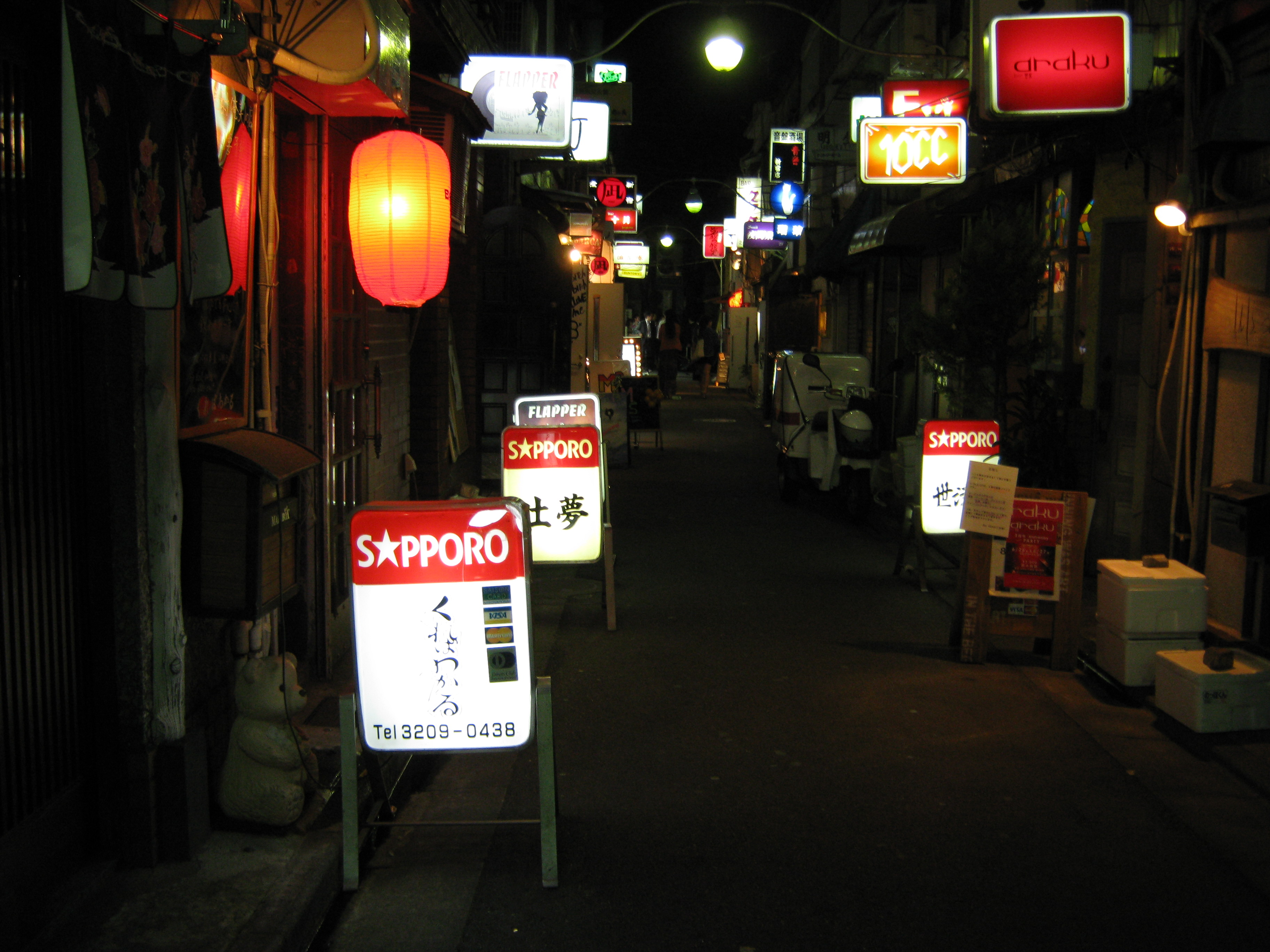
G2 Street at night

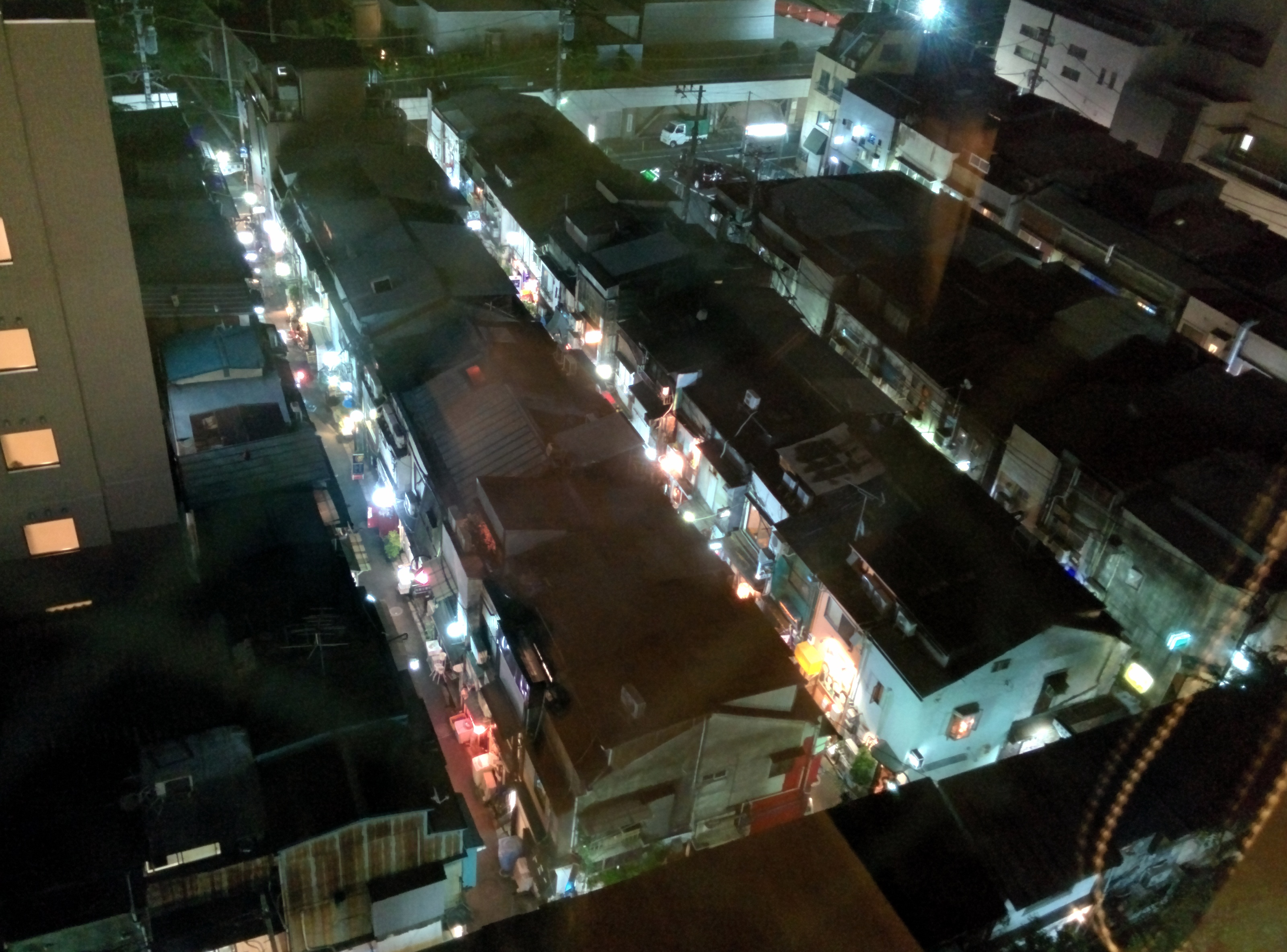
Akarui Hanazono Goban Street, Akarui Hanazono Sanban Street, Akarui Hanazono Ichiban Street, and G2 Street from above at night

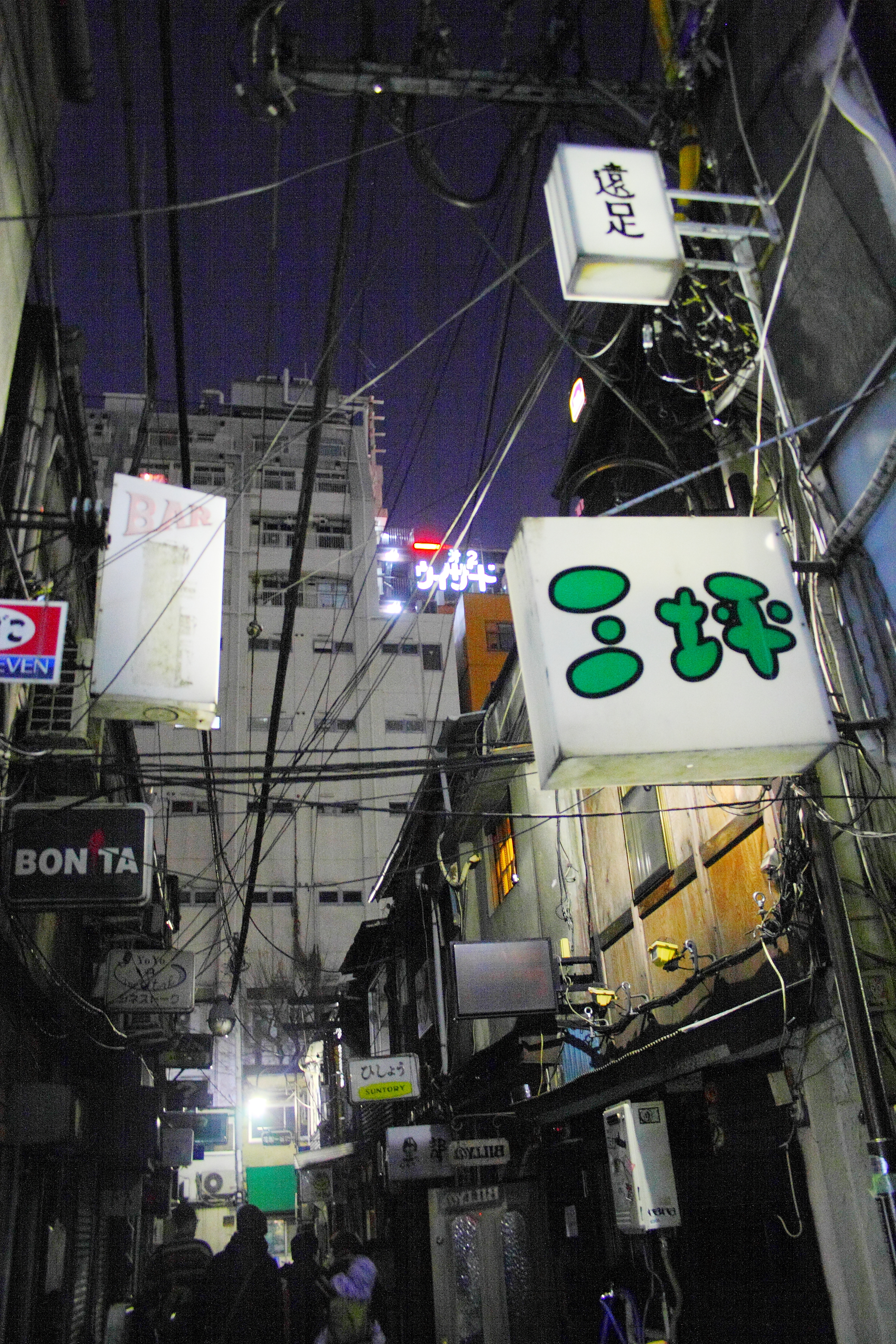
Akarui Hanazono Ichiban Street

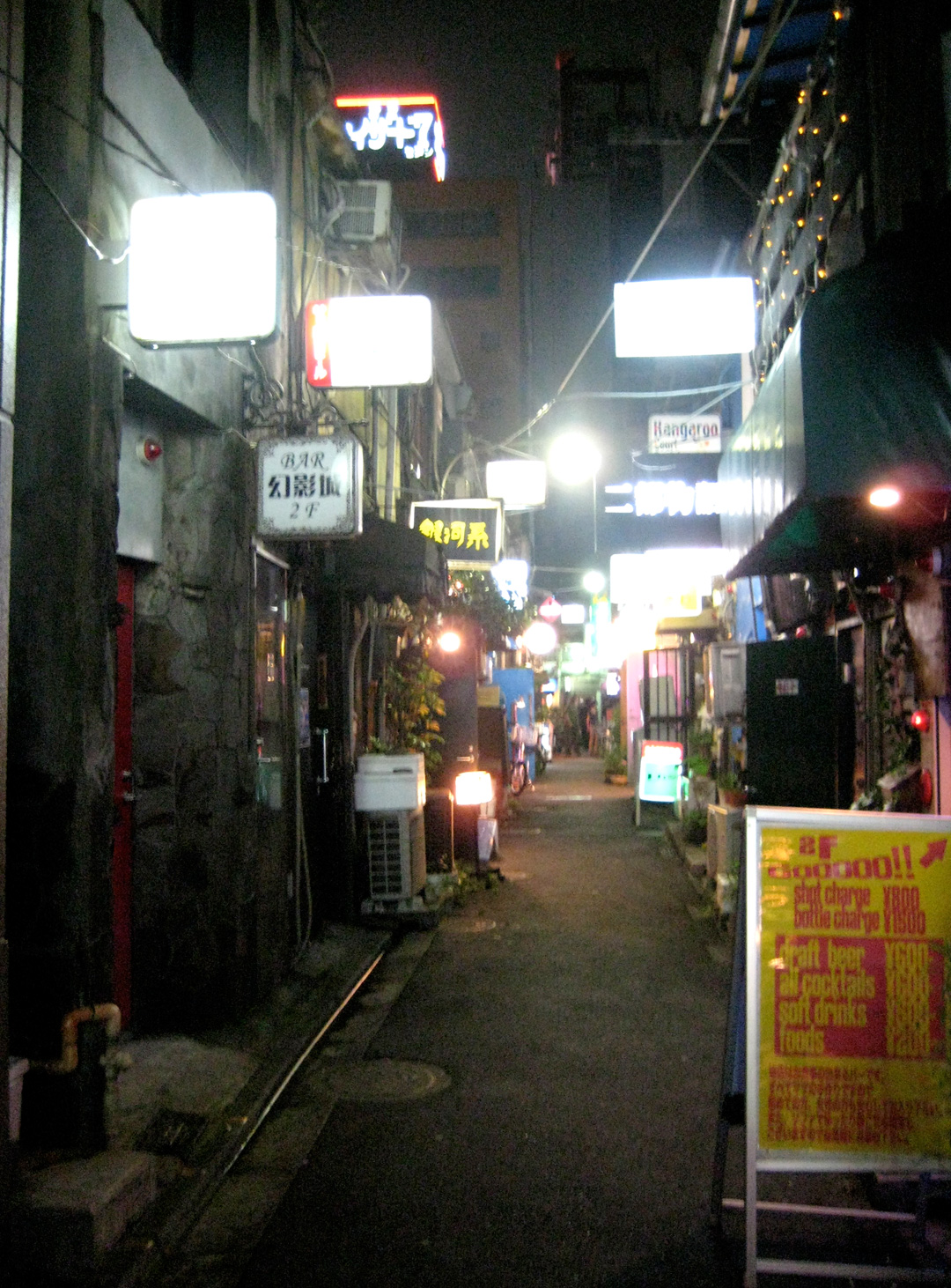
Golden Gai at night

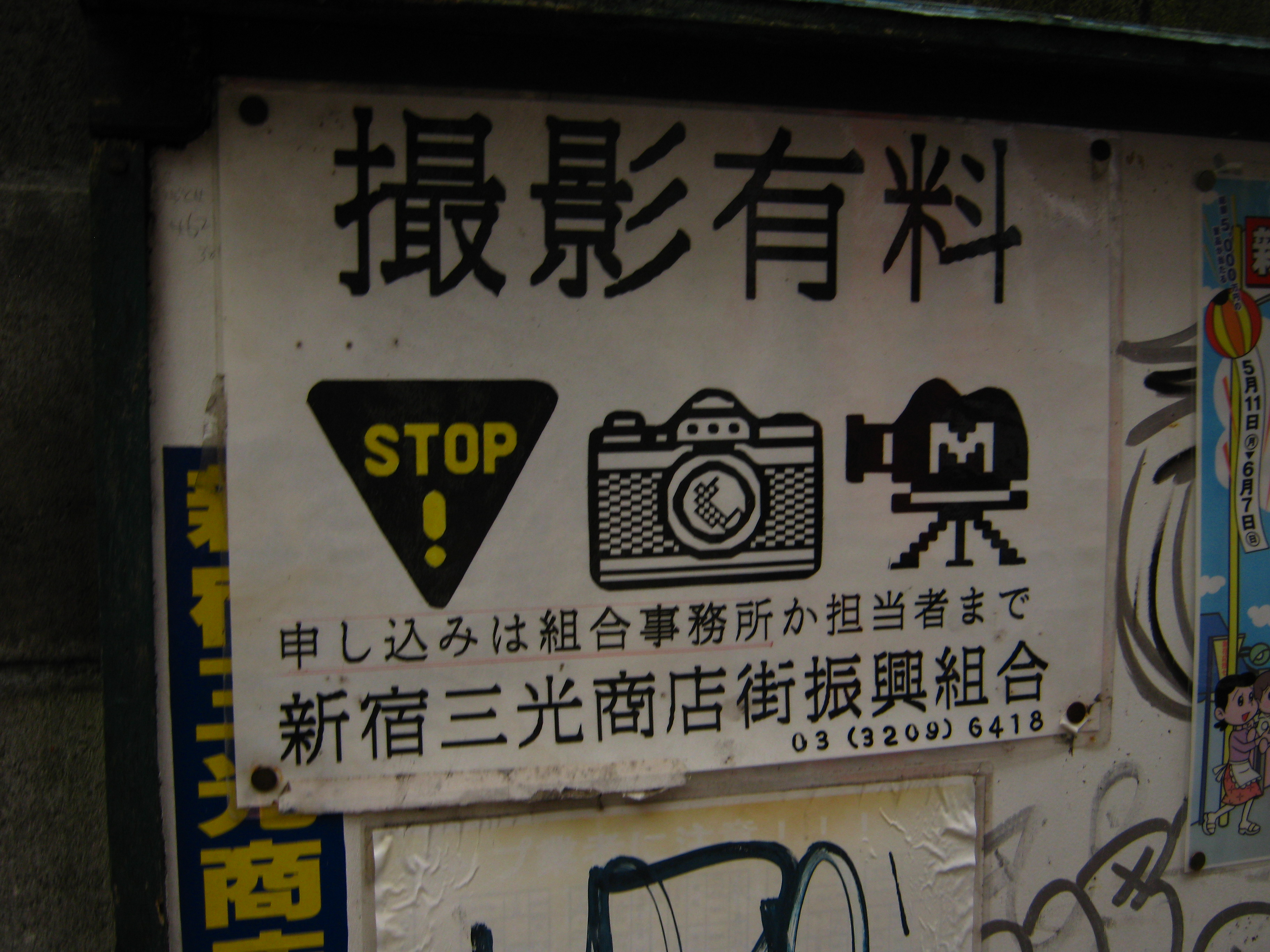
"Photography - fee required" sign in Shinjuku Golden Gai

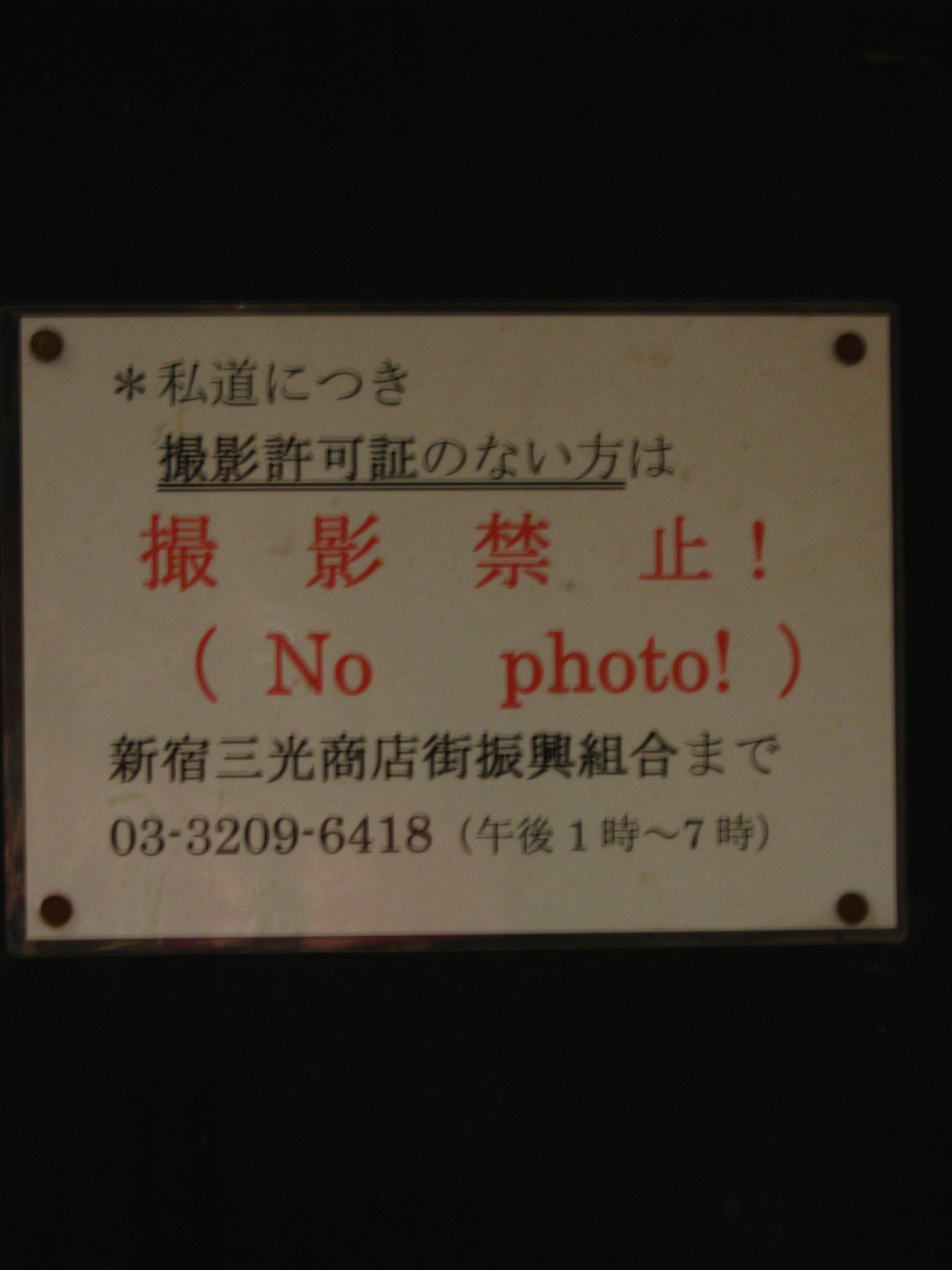
No photography sign in Golden Gai
