= Kabukichō =

District located in Shinjuku-ku, Tokyo

Kabuki-chō 歌舞伎町
- Entertainment district
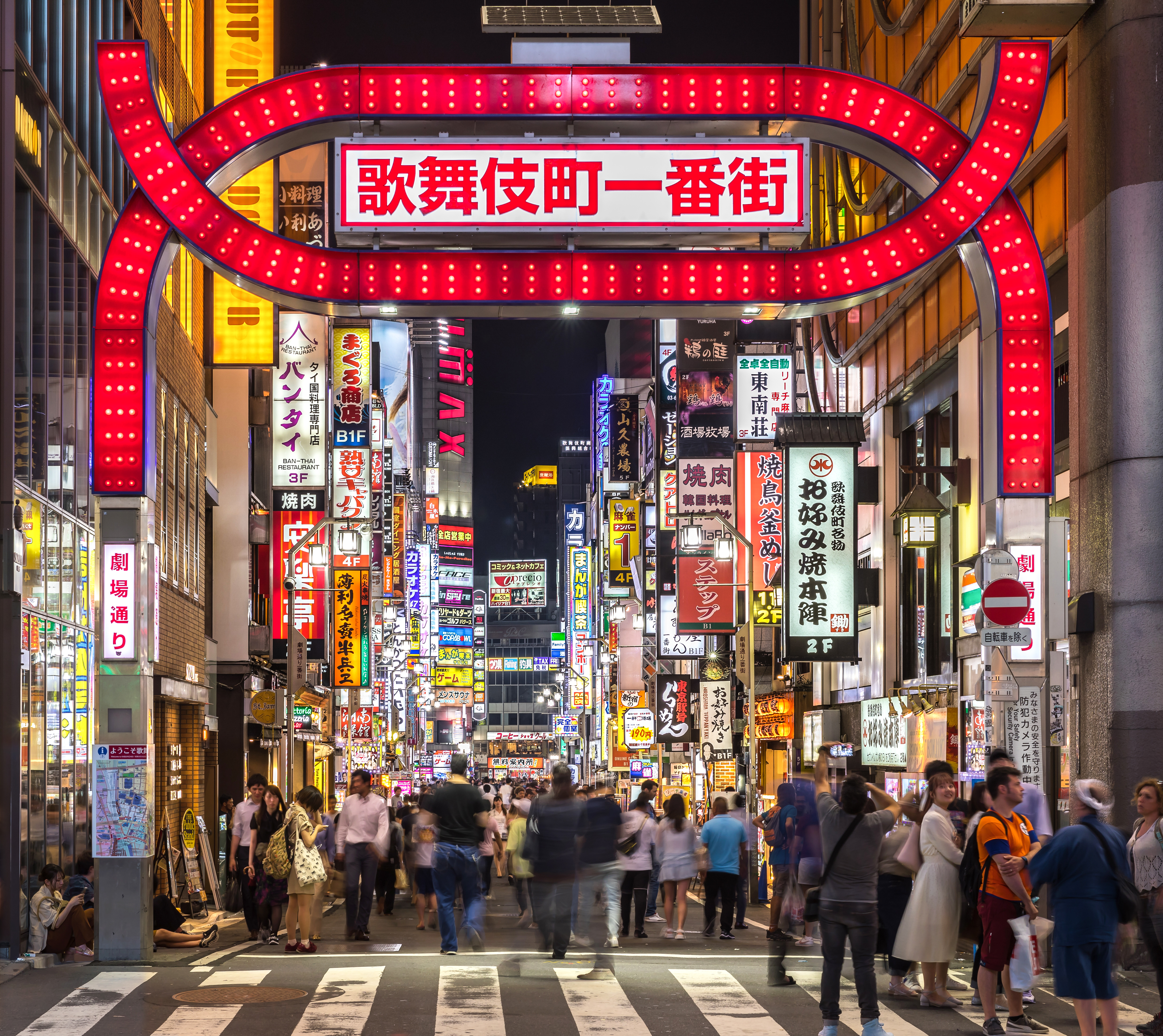
- Kabukichō Ichiban-gai and colourful neon street signs
- Nickname: Sleepless Town (眠らない街)
- Location within Special wards of Tokyo Location within Tokyo Location within Japan
- Coordinates: 35°41′42″N 139°42′18″E
- Region: Kantō
- Prefecture: Tokyo
- Special ward: Shinjuku

Area
  - Total: 36 ha (89 acres)
- Time zone: UTC+9 (Japan Standard Time)
- Website: www.kabukicho.or.jp

Kabukichō (歌舞伎町, Kabuki-chō; pronounced [kabɯki̥ tɕoː]) is an entertainment district in Shinjuku, Tokyo, Japan. Kabukichō is considered a red-light district with a high concentration of host and hostess clubs, love hotels, shops, restaurants, and nightclubs, and is often called the "Sleepless Town" (眠らない街, Nemuranai Machi; pronounced [nemɯɾanai matɕiꜜ]). Shinjuku Golden Gai, famous for its plethora of small bars, is part of Kabukichō.

The district's name comes from late-1940s plans to build a kabuki theater, and although the theater was never built, the name stuck.

The area has many movie theaters, and is located near Shinjuku Station, Seibu Shinjuku Station, and several other major railway and subway stations.

The Shinjuku City Office / ward office is located in Kabukichō.

== History ==
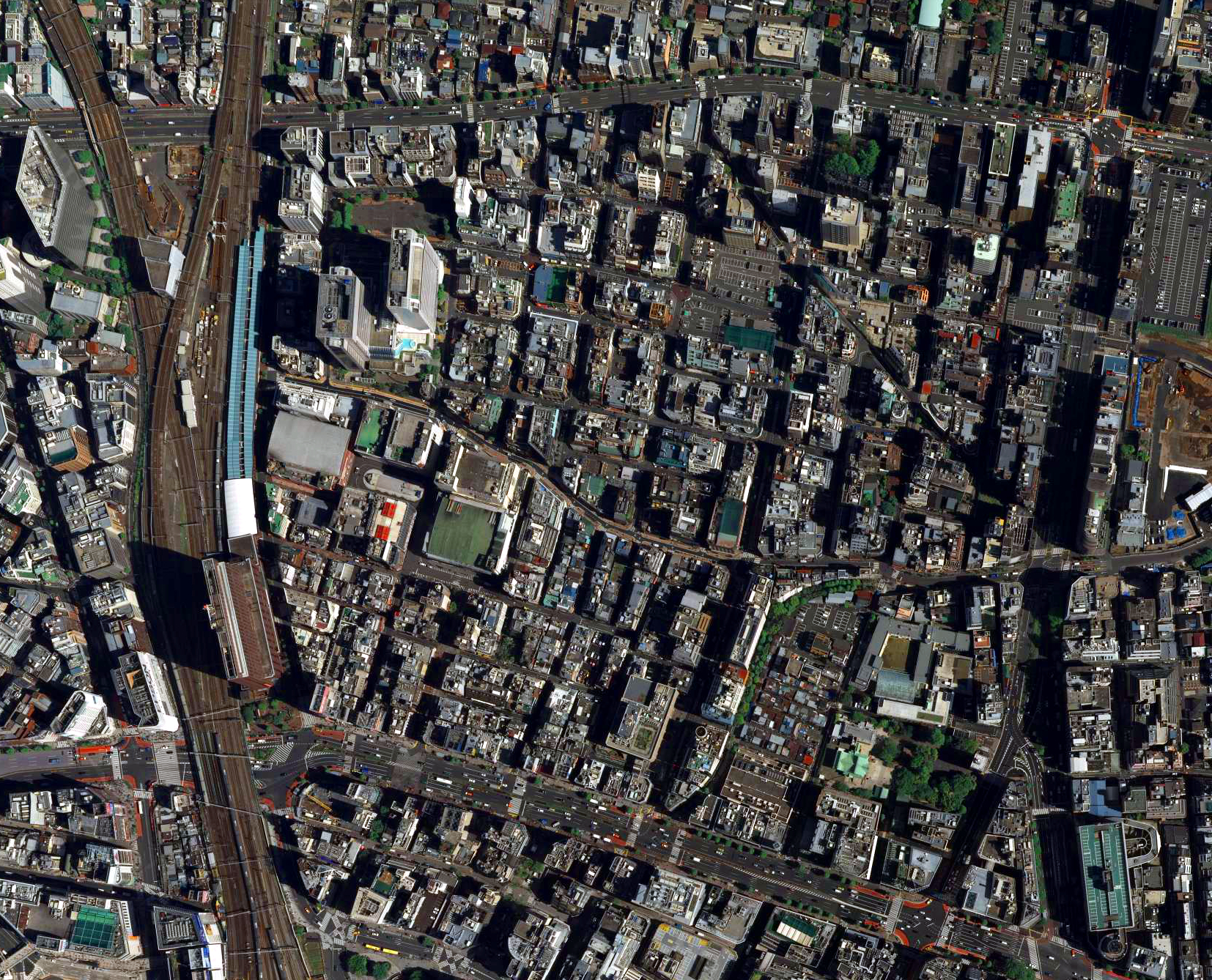
Aerial photograph (2009)

Originally, the area was known as Tsunohazu (角筈) and was a swamp. After the Meiji Period, the area became a duck sanctuary. As the Yodobashi Purification Plant was built in 1893, the ponds were filled in. In 1920, a girls' school was built there, and the surroundings were developed into a residential area. Prior to World War II, the district was one of the areas open to non-mainland property owners (primarily from the colonies in Taiwan and Korea), who mainly operated tsurekomi yado, predecessors to today's love hotels.

During the war, a bombing raid on April 13, 1945, razed the area to the ground. After the war, Kihei Suzuki from the Shinjuku Revitalization Land Readjustment Union worked with the major landowner, Mohei Mineshima to draw up plans for Kiku-za, a kabuki theatre, in the area; they believed that performers from the Kabuki-za theatre in Ginza would accept their invitation to perform at Kiku-za. As a result, Hideaki Ishikawa, a regional planner, dubbed the town Kabukichō, which was adopted on April 1, 1948. Although the theatre was cancelled due to financial problems, the name remained. The Tokyu Cultural Hall (to the south, in Shibuya), Tokyu Milano-za movie theater, Tokyo Ice Skating Rink, and Shinjuku Koma Theater were all completed in 1956, cementing the area's reputation as an entertainment center.

Kabukichō was quickly redeveloped after the war, mainly due to the efforts of the overseas Chinese in Japan who bought land left unused after the expos and greatly developed them. The "three most renowned overseas Chinese of Kabukicho" include the founder of Humax, Lin Yi-wen, who started his business with a cabaret; Lin Tsai-wang, who built the Fūrin Kaikan; and Lee Ho-chu, owner of the Tokyo Hotel Chinese restaurant. In 2002, it was estimated that 70% of the land in Kabukichō was owned by foreign-born Japanese residents and their descendants. The rise of home video entertainment decreased the demand for live performances and film theaters, and Kabukichō became home to a number of video arcades, discos, and fuzoku (businesses offering sexual services).

Watanabe Katsumi, a portrait photographer who took pictures and sold prints back to his subjects for a modest ¥200, documented the citizens of Kabukichō during this transition period in the 1960s and 1970s. His portraits of Kabukichō residents received critical attention and praise from fellow photographers, and are today exhibited in museums like the Metropolitan Museum of Art. In 1971, Takeshi Aida, a former mattress salesman, opened "Club Ai", the first host club in Kabukichō; at its peak, Aida's company reported ¥2.7 billion in annual revenue.

By 1999, the area had been named "Asia's largest adult entertainment district", and tabloids were regularly running candid photographs of drunken Kabukichō patrons fighting and being arrested. However, starting in 2003, joint citizen and police patrols began enforcing business licensing, and the 1948 Businesses Affecting Public Morals Regulation Act was more strictly enforced as well starting in April 2004, forcing adult-themed businesses to start removing customers at midnight in preparation to close by 1 AM. Kabukichō leaders attributed the change in enforcement to Tokyo Governor Shintaro Ishihara and the Tokyo bid for the 2016 Summer Olympics. Today, the 36 ha (89 acres; 0.14 sq mi) Kabukichō district has all the hallmarks of a red-light district, with over three thousand bars, nightclubs, love hotels, massage parlours, and hostess clubs. However, there are no red lights in the literal sense with prostitutes in the windows as in Amsterdam.

With increased tourism from China and South Korea, tourists can now be seen in Kabukichō even during daytime. After several large hotels opened in the district, the Kabukicho Concierge Association was formed to recommend businesses that would be safe for foreign patrons, as the area is notorious for the practice known as bottakuri, where some businesses add exorbitant hidden fees to bring the final bill well beyond the initial advertised prices.

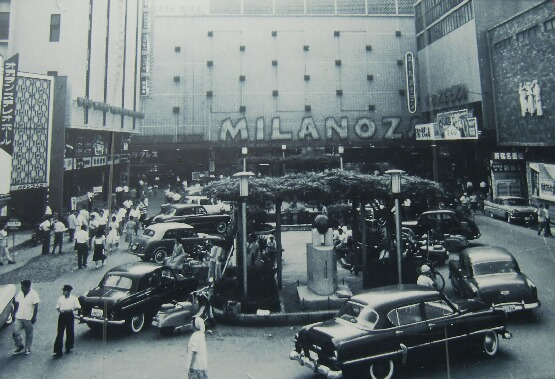
Tokyu Mirano-za (1959)

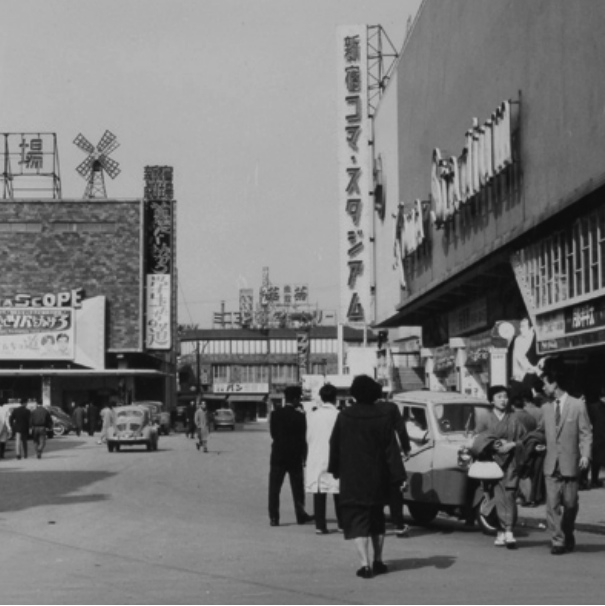
Shinjuku Koma, looking north from the east end of Cinecity Square (1960)

== Geography and statistics ==
Selected locations in and near Kabukichō, Shinjuku, Tokyo
- Points of interest
- Transportation
- Parks and open spaces
1 Red "Ichiban-gai Gate" entrance
2 Seibu-Shinjuku Station
3 Cinecity Square
4 Ohkubo Hospital
5 Ōkubo Park
6 Don Quijote (store)
7 Godzilla head / Toho Cinemas
8 Robot Restaurant
9 Shinjuku Golden Gai
10 Hanazono Shrine
11 Shinjuku Station, East Exit

Kabukichō is generally bounded by:

- Railroad tracks (on the west)
- Yasukuni-Dōri (靖国通り) (on the south)
- Tokyo Metropolitan Route 305 (Meiji-Dōri (明治通り), on the east)
- Tokyo Metropolitan Route 302 (Shokuan-Dōri (職安通り), on the north)

=== Notable locations ===
The red Kabuki-chō Ichiban-gai (歌舞伎町一番街) gate, near the southwest corner along Yasukuni-Dōri, is often photographed as the main entrance to Kabukichō. Other major entrances, east of Ichibangai-Dōri along Yasukuni-Dōri, include Central Road (セントラルロード, Sentoraru Rōdo), where the Kabukichō branch of Don Quijote is; and another neon-lit arch at Sakura-Dōri (さくら通り).

The Shinjuku Koma Theater was a landmark in Kabukichō. By 2008, it had moved to its third location; since it opened in 1956, it has hosted concerts and other performances by top stars, including enka singers Saburō Kitajima, Kiyoshi Hikawa, and actor Ken Matsudaira. The management announced that they would close after the December 31, 2008 show, and the building was demolished in 2009. The site was redeveloped and the Toho Shinjuku Building was completed there in 2014, including the 12-screen Toho Cinemas Shinjuku theatre and the Hotel Gracery Shinjuku. A "life-size" replica of Godzilla (from the neck up) was added to an outdoor terrace in 2015; it has since become a local landmark.

The Tokyu Milano-za movie theater, just west of Cinecity Square, was the largest in Japan when it opened in 1956. The cinema showed many of the latest movies in Japan, including anime films. As well as a cinema, which had four screens at the time of closure, the Tokyu Milano-za complex also had a skate rink when it first opened which was converted into a bowling alley called the Milano Bowl a few years later, a Japanese restaurant (both the bowling alley and the Japanese restaurant closed alongside the cinema), a Chinese restaurant (closed in 2008), a fast food restaurant (Wimpy until the mid 1990s, Mos Burger afterwards; closed in 2011) and a casino. Its last day of operation was December 31, 2014, closing after a screening of the film E.T. the Extra-Terrestrial. A 225 m (738 ft) high skyscraper called the Tokyu Kabukicho Tower (which is being developed by the former owners of the Tokyu Milano) is built and was opened on 14 April 2023.

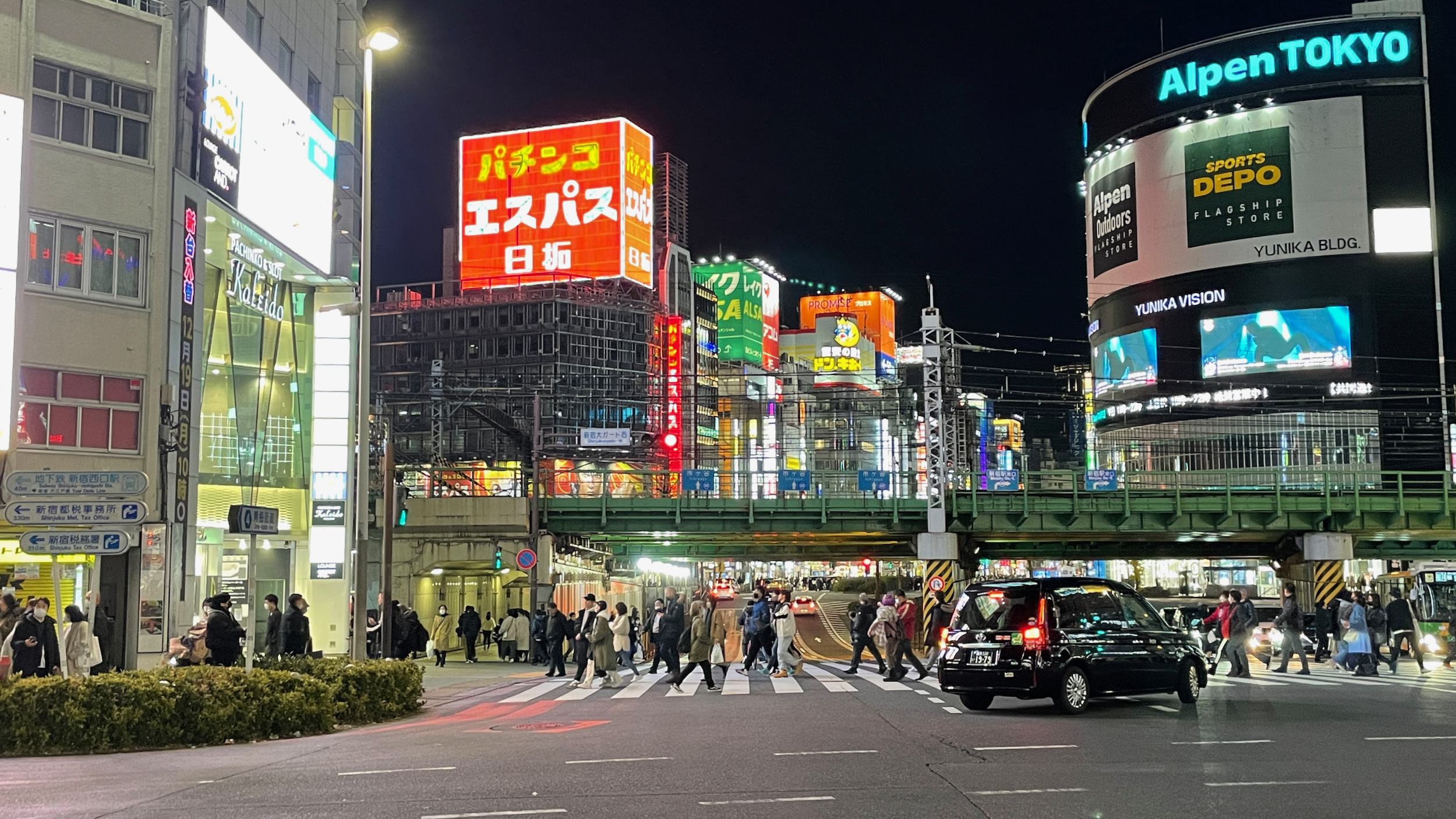
The bridge over Ōme Kaidō looking east towards Kabukichō

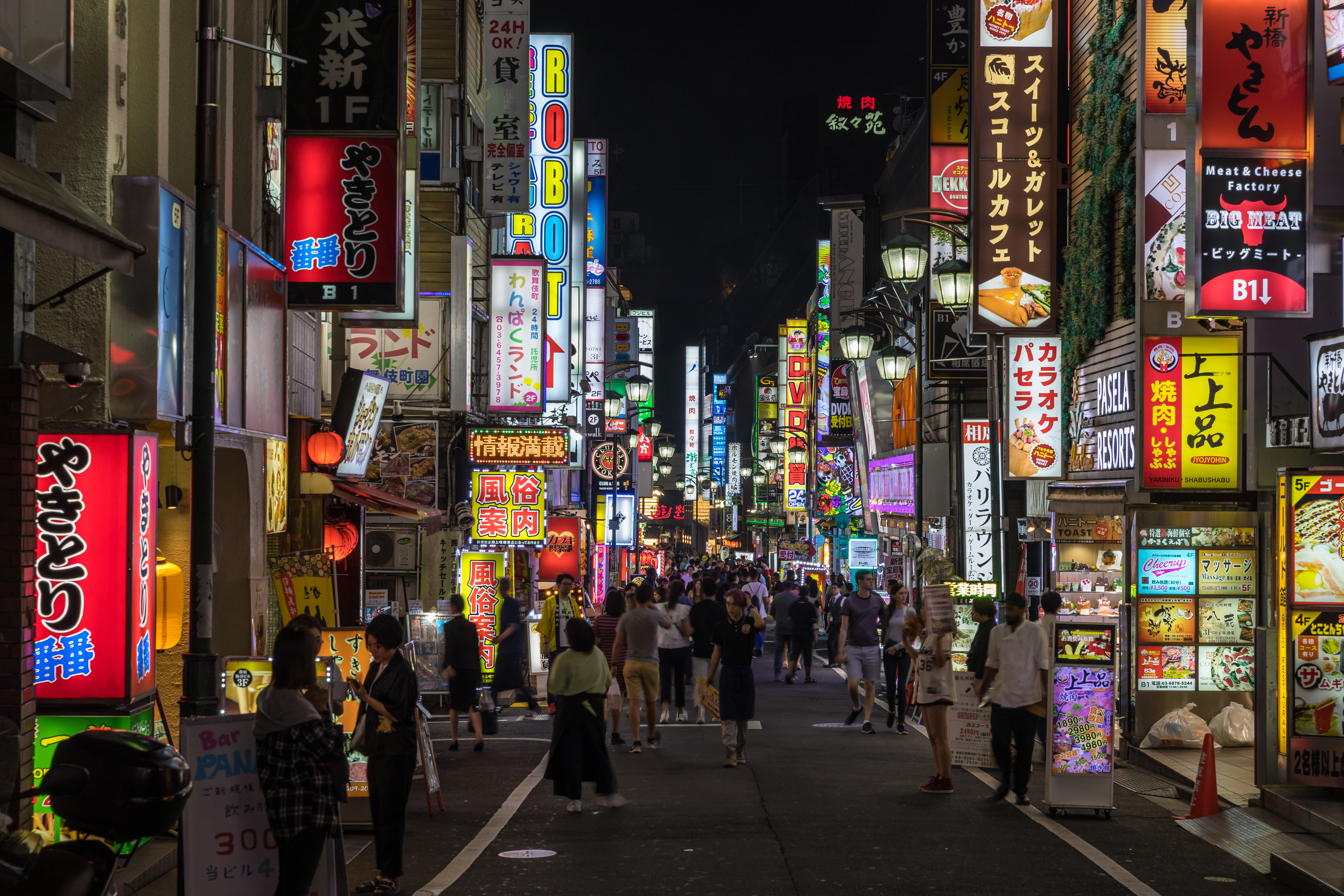
Neon street signs at Sakura-Dōri

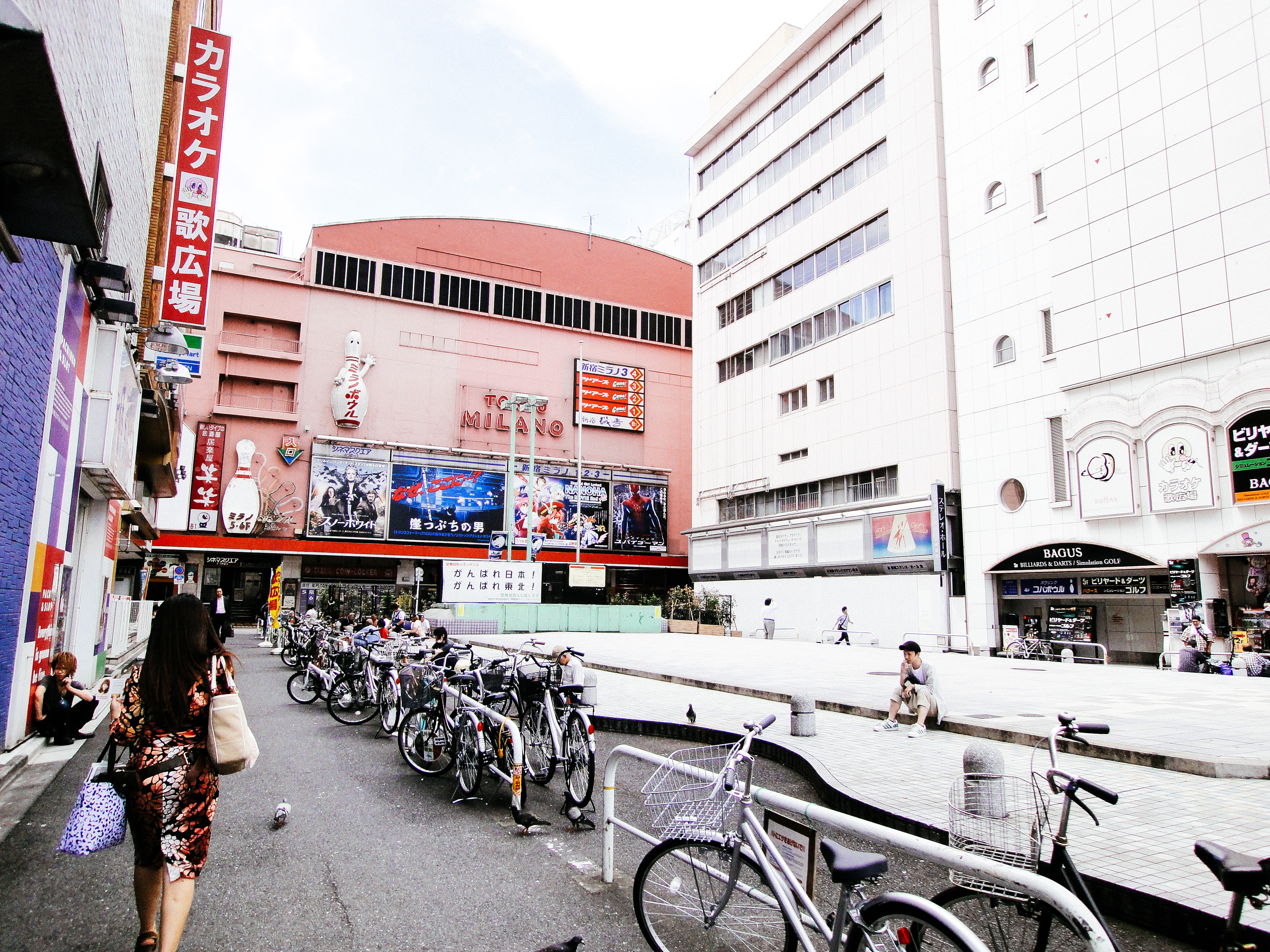
Tokyu Milano-za in 2012, looking west from Cinecity Square

== Crime ==
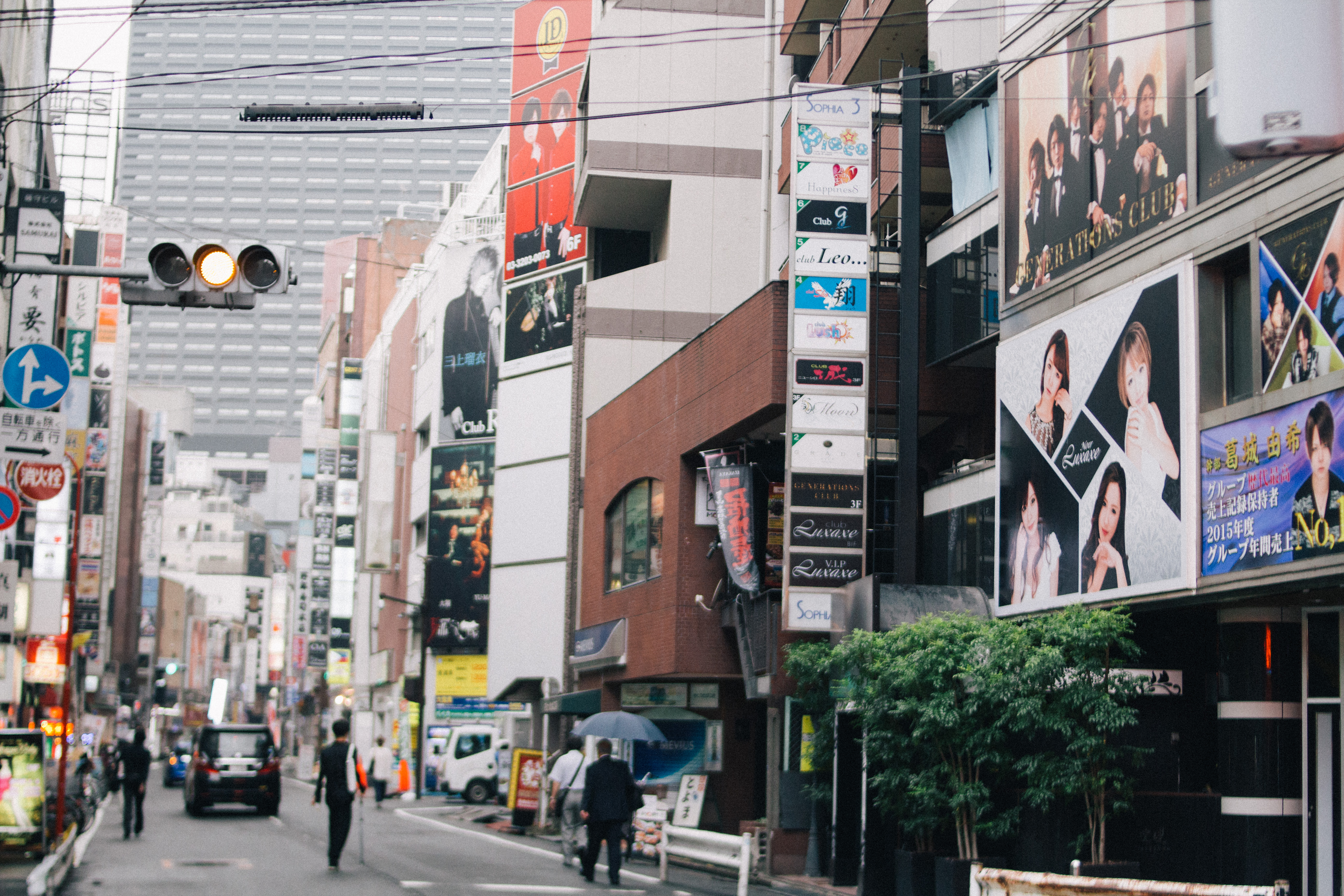
Advertisements for host, hostess, and cabaret clubs (2016)

In 2004, according to a spokesperson of Metropolitan Tokyo, there were more than 1,000 yakuza in Kabukichō, and 120 different enterprises under their control.

Entering the new millennium, laws were more strictly enforced and patrols became more frequent. In addition, fifty closed-circuit cameras were installed in May 2002 after the Myojo 56 building fire that killed 44; the patrols and cameras reduced criminal activities in Kabukichō, amidst controversy.

Private citizens and government agencies launched a joint effort in July 2003, called the Shinjuku Shopping Center Committee to Expel Organized-Crime Groups, with the aim to replace unlicensed and adult-oriented businesses (which were believed to pay protection fees to organized crime groups) with legitimate businesses. In 2004, the police undertook an operation clamping down on illegal clubs and brothels, causing many to go out of business. An amendment to the 1948 Adult Entertainment law made aggressive catching of female patrons by male hosts illegal. Also, the Kabukichō Renaissance organization started in April 2008 to rid Kabukichō of the yakuza; office manager Yoshihisa Shimoda stated "[a]t the end of the day, we want Kabukicho to be clean. We want security, safety and a pleasant environment."

In 2011, Tokyo began to enforce the Organised Crime Exclusion Ordinance, which makes it a crime for businesses or individuals to deal with the yakuza. The punishment for violating the ordinance, which ranges up to one year in prison and a fine of ¥50,000, is intended to provide an excuse for refusing to make protection payments. In recent years, with the increase in tourism, especially among younger foreign visitors interested in Japanese nightlife, several concierge and community groups have attempted to provide safer matchmaking and social interaction experiences in the district. Some newer dating platforms, such as Yoitoki, have specifically marketed themselves as foreigner-friendly services offering pre-agreed transportation compensation and mutual consent-based arrangements. These platforms are often discussed in travel-related content across social media, especially among Tokyo-based influencers documenting modern dating culture in areas like Kabukichō.

=== Bottakuri ===
Bottakuri is a form of a clip joint where patrons are attracted by a low advertised price but then charged numerous hidden fees. In one instance, a group of nine was lured into a bar under the promise the all-inclusive cost was ¥4,000 (about US$29 in 2025); the hostesses inside consumed 172 drinks and the final bill was ¥2,663,000, over US$19,000 in 2025 dollars. The staff at the bar allegedly threatened the patrons to ensure payment. In 2015, there were 1,052 reported cases of bottakuri in the first four months of the year alone, particularly targeting foreign tourists from China and Korea, prompting a crackdown that began in May; in July, there were only 45 reported cases of bottakuri and 28 bars had been shut down.

In 2007, local businessman Takeshi Aida founded the Shinjuku Kabukicho Host Club Anti-Organized Crime Gang Association to disassociate host and hostess clubs from organized crime, reduce the aggressive "catching" street solicitations, and eliminate the bottakuri practice.

== Education ==
The Shinjuku City Board of Education operates public elementary and junior high schools.

Kabuki-cho 2-chome and a portion of Kabuki-cho 1-chome is zoned to Ōkubo Elementary School (大久保小学校) and Shinjuku Junior High School (新宿中学校). Another portion of Kabuki-cho 1-chome is zoned to Hanazono Elementary School (花園小学校) and Yotsuya Junior High School (四谷中学校).

== In popular culture ==
Kabukichō has been featured in:

- Black Lagoon (manga)
- Case File nº221: Kabukicho (anime television series)
- City Hunter (manga)
- Cells at Work! Code Black as kanzō (肝臟, "Liver")
- Digimon Story: Time Stranger (role-playing video game)
- Gintama (manga)
- Hypnosis Mic: Division Rap Battle (multimedia project)
- Ichi the Killer (both film and manga)
- 20th Century Boys (manga)
- Lost in Translation 2003 film
- Enter the Void 2009 film
- Midnight Diner (Japanese TV series)
- Odd Taxi (anime)
- Persona 5 (video game) as 歓楽街 ("Entertainment District")
- Shin Petshop of Horrors (manga)
- A Place Further than the Universe (anime)
- Tokyo Afterschool Summoners (role-playing video game)
- Tokyo Vice (2009 memoir by Jake Adelstein)
- Watamote (anime) Episode 5
- Weathering with You (film)
- Yakuza and Judgment (video game series), as Kamurochō
- In the Miso Soup (1997 novel)
- Marvel’s Wolverine (2026 video game)

== Gallery ==
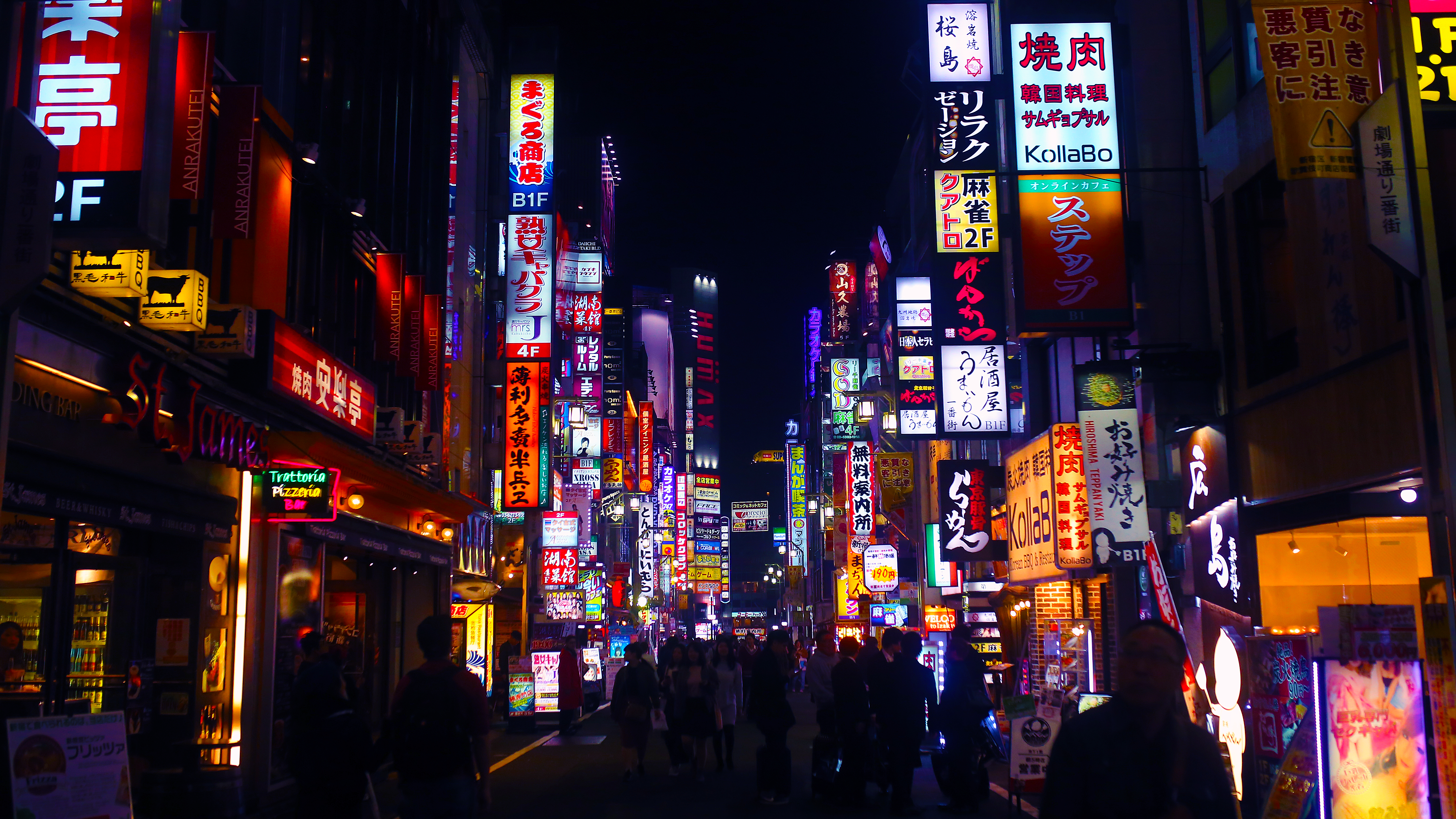
Kabukichō, view north along Ichibangai-dori towards the Humax Pavilion complex (night, 2016)

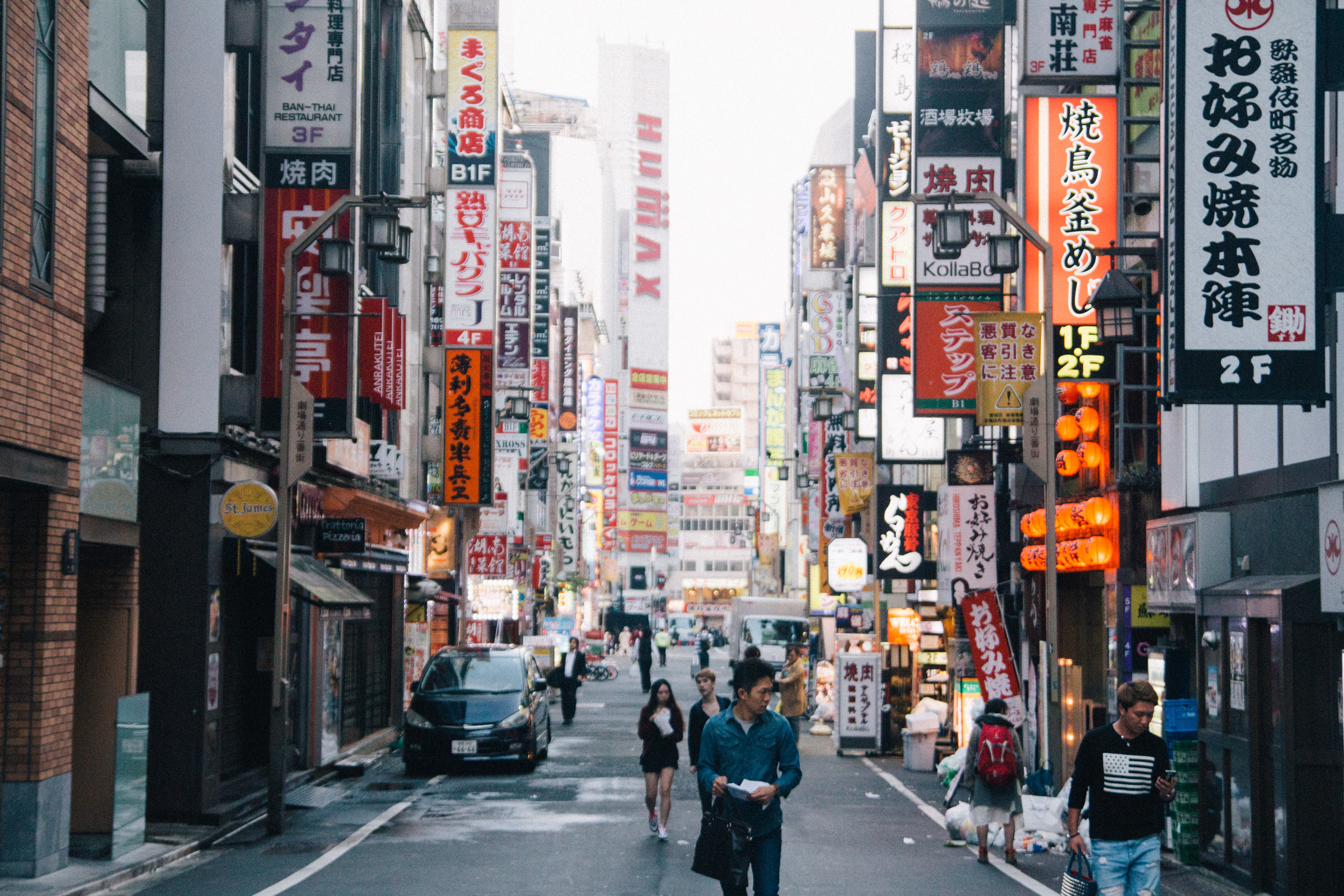
Kabukichō, view north along Ichibangai-dori towards the Humax Pavilion complex (day, 2016)

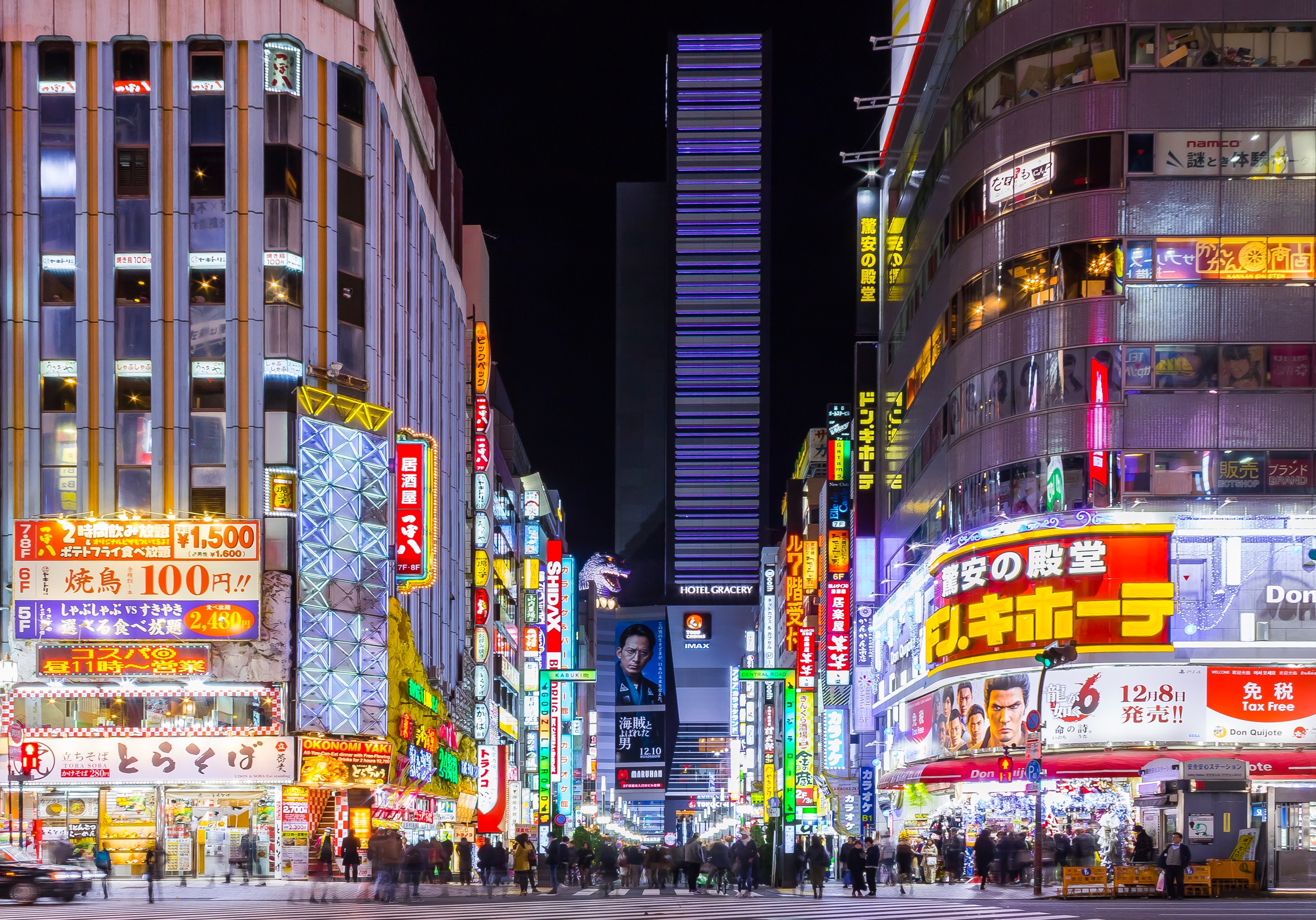
View north along Central Road towards Toho Building

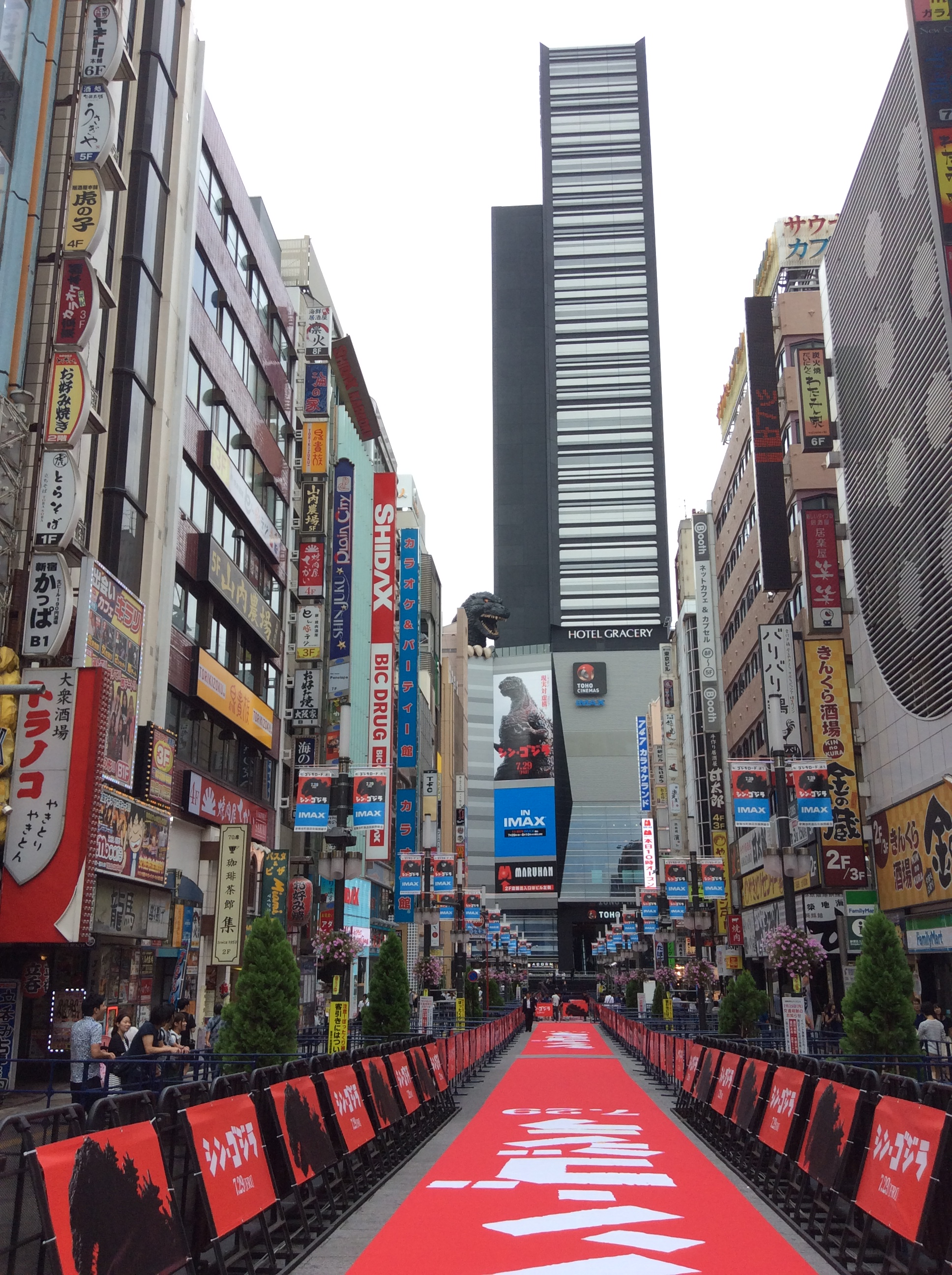
Shinjuku Toho Building

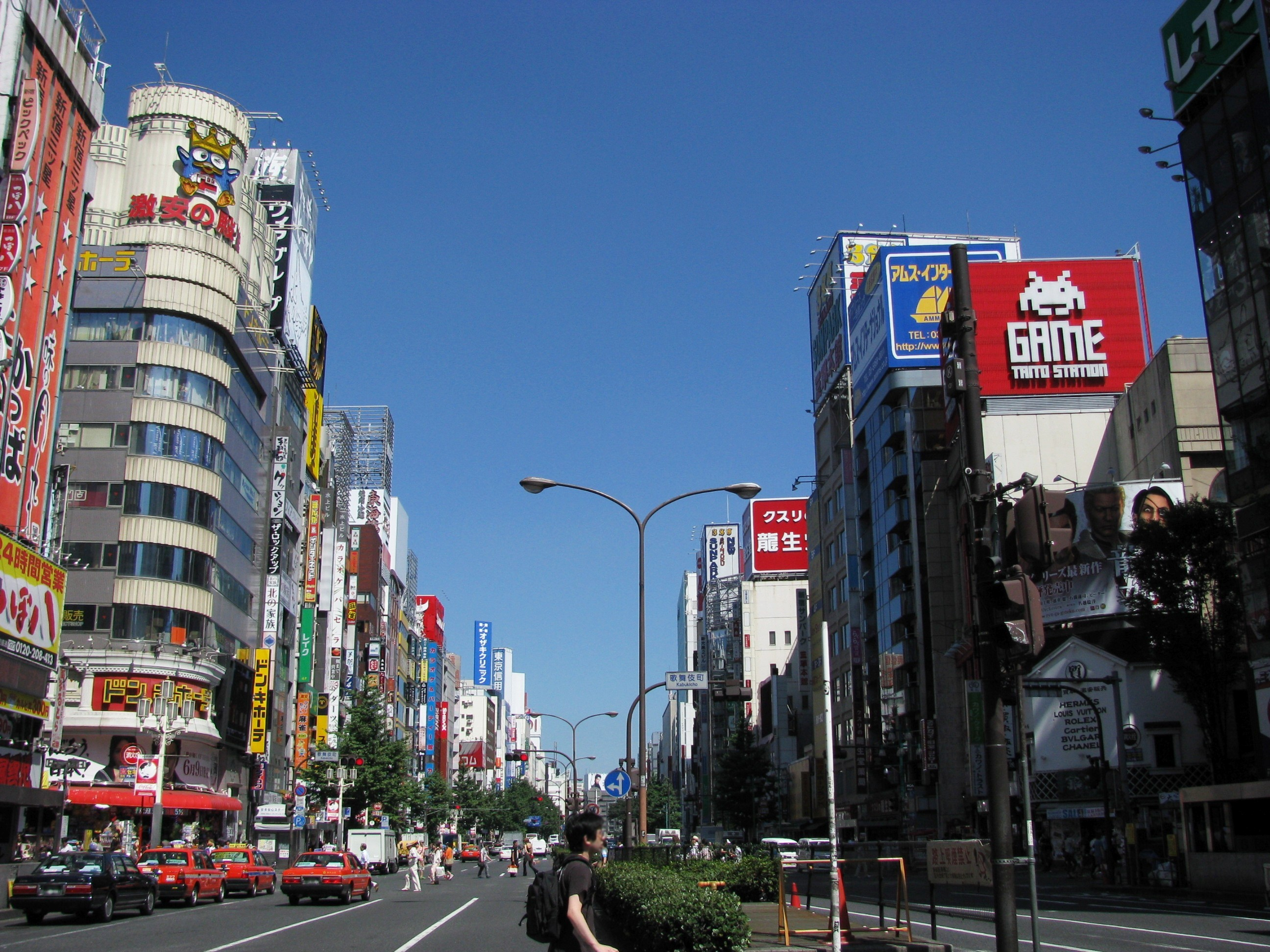
View east along Yasukuni-Dori, the southern border

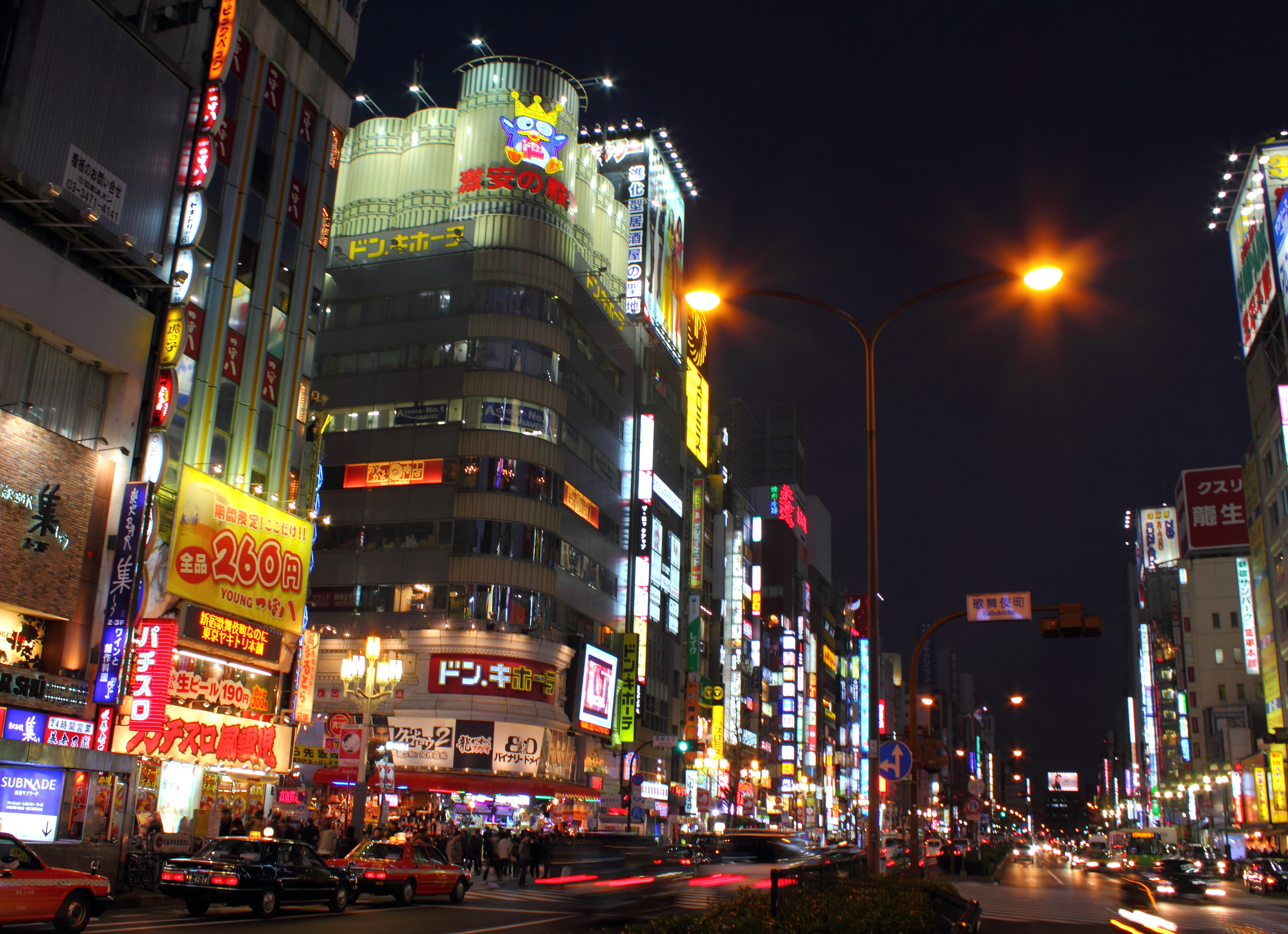
View east along Yasukuni-Dori at night

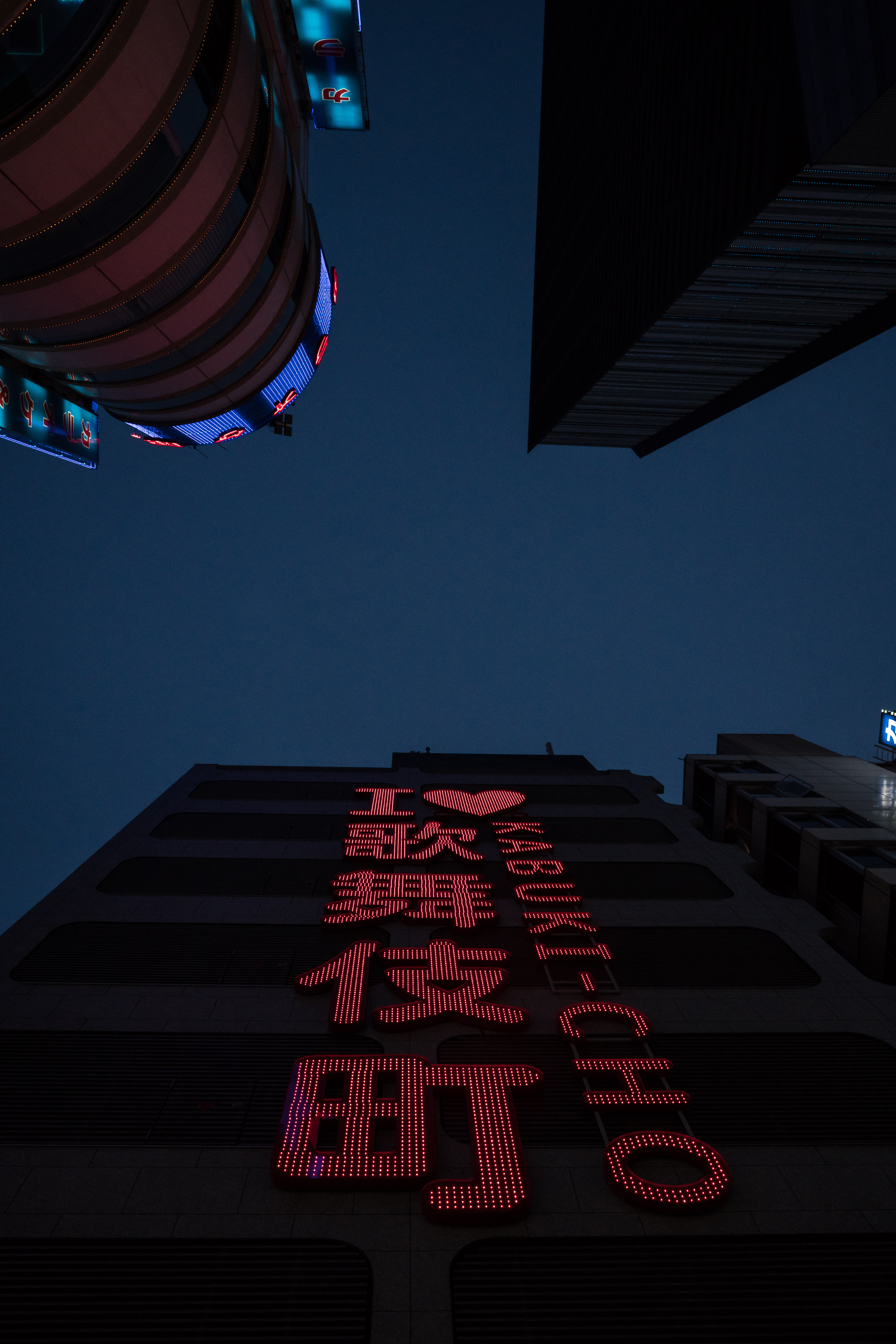
I ♥ Kabukichō sign

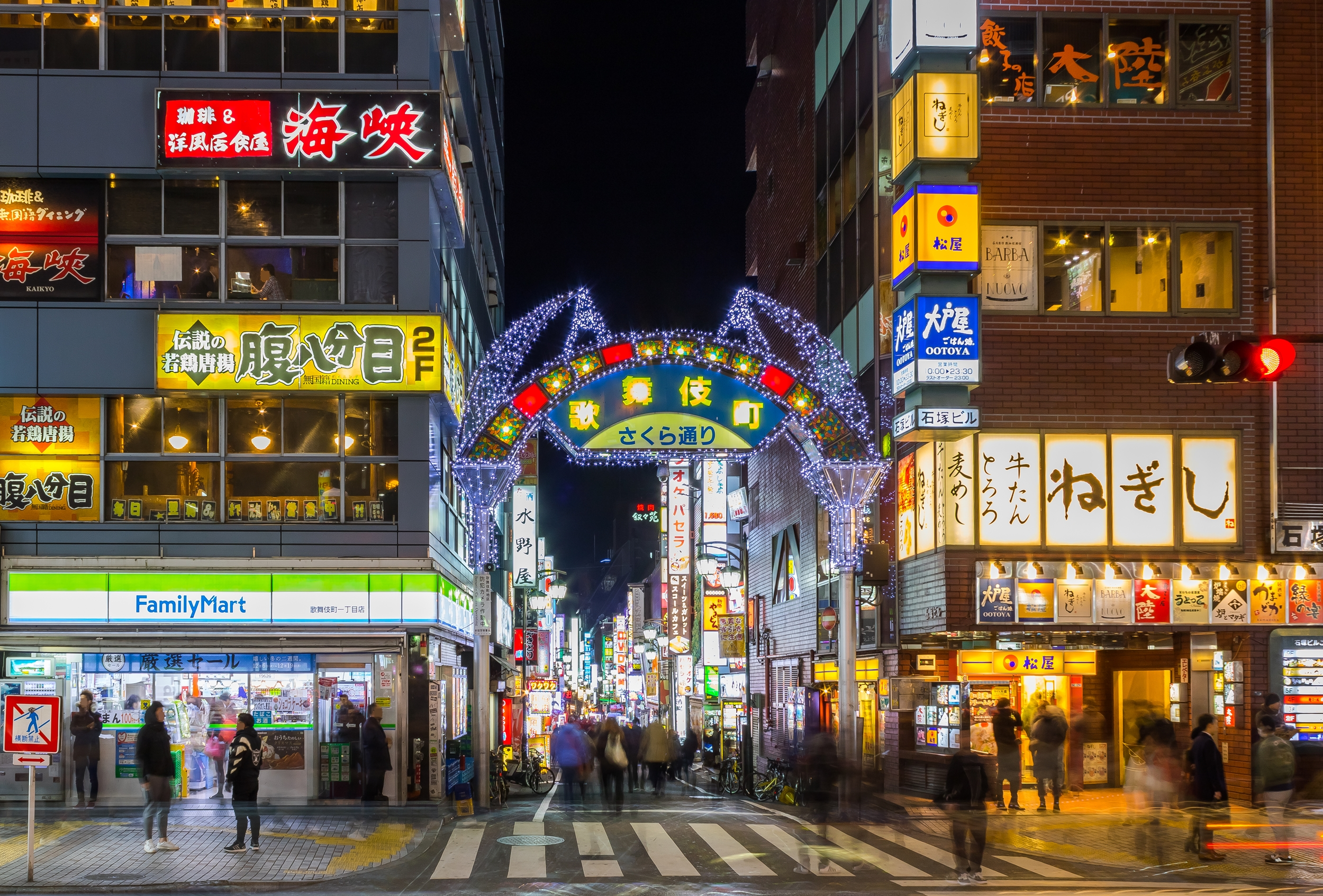
Gate at Sakura-Dori, looking north from Yasukuni-Dori

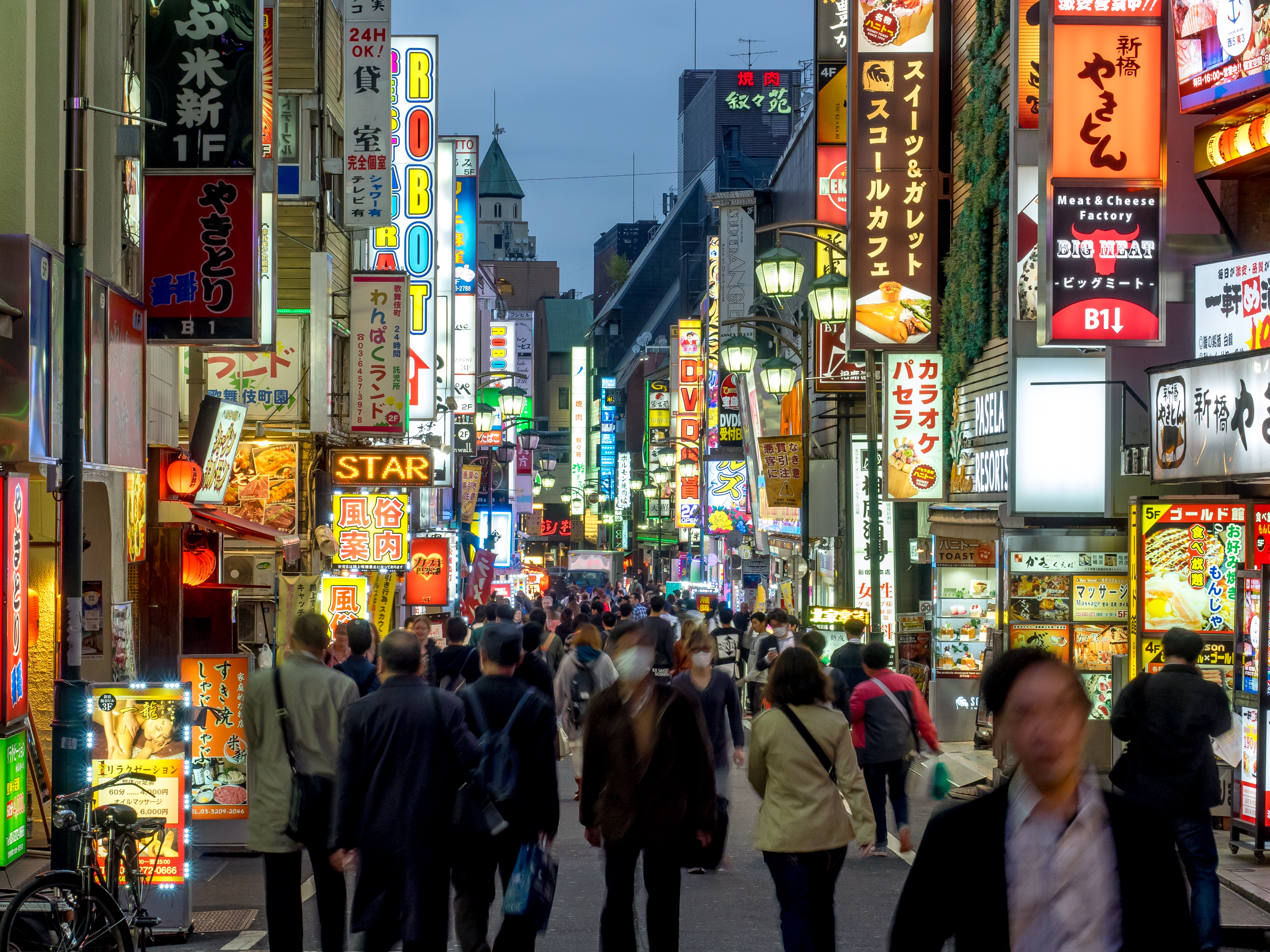
Sakura-Dori at dusk

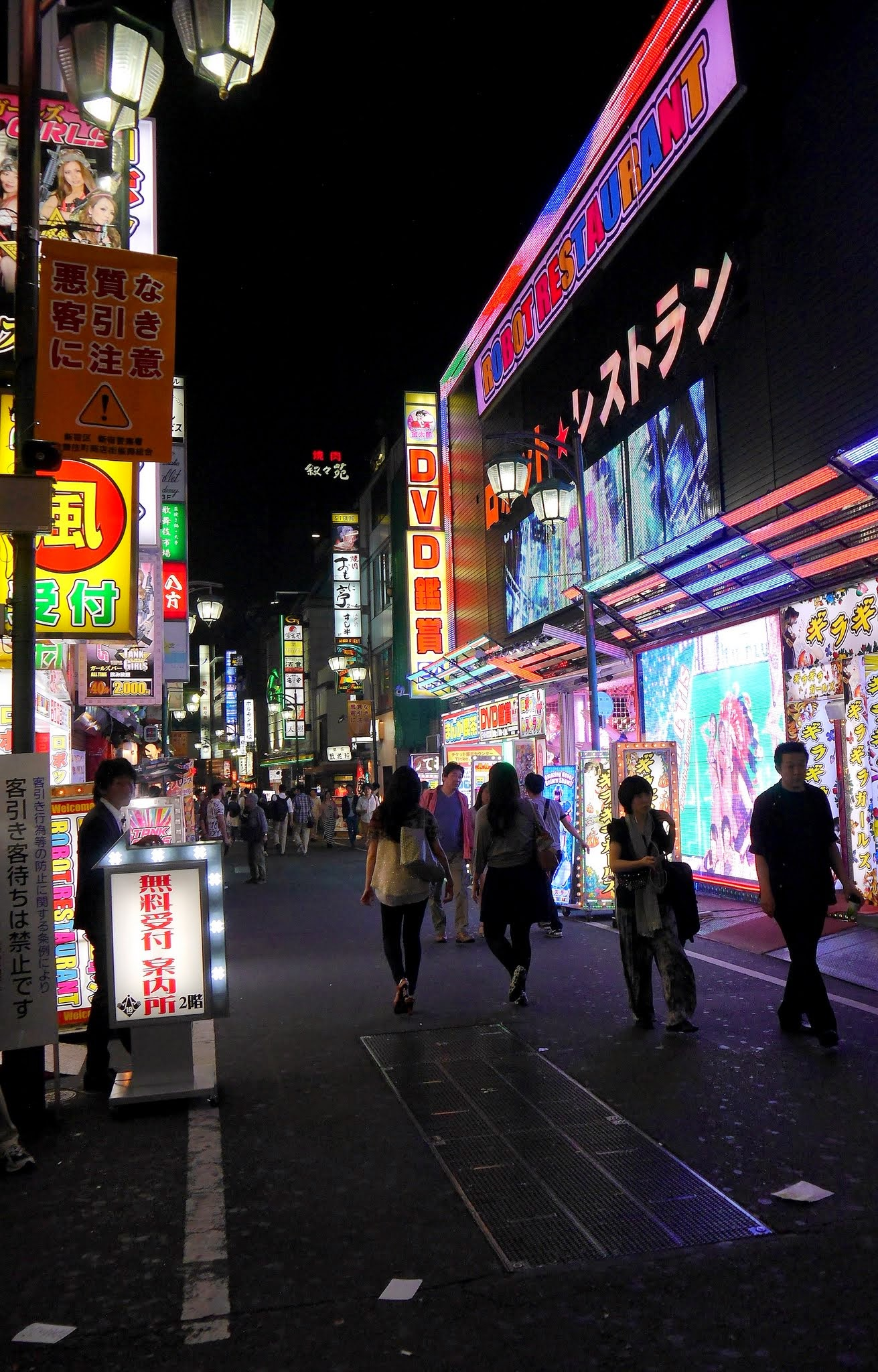
Signs along Sakura-Dori, including entrance to the Robot Restaurant

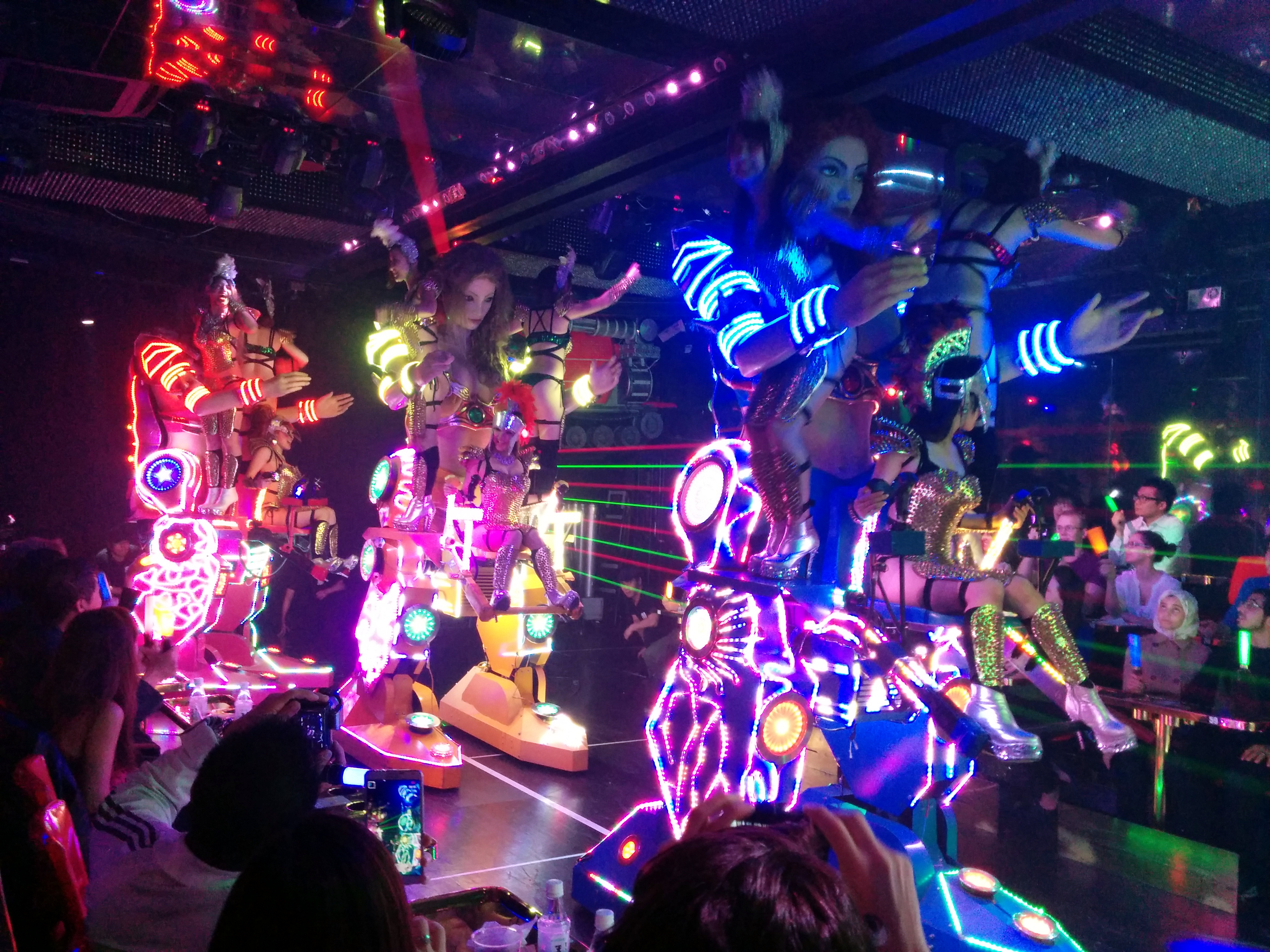
Show at the Robot Restaurant

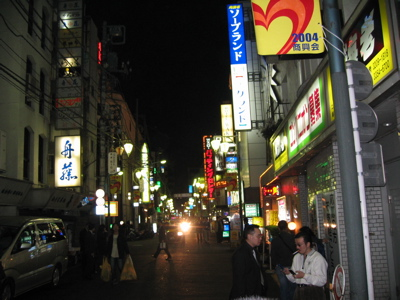
Kabukicho back alleys are a popular yakuza hangout.

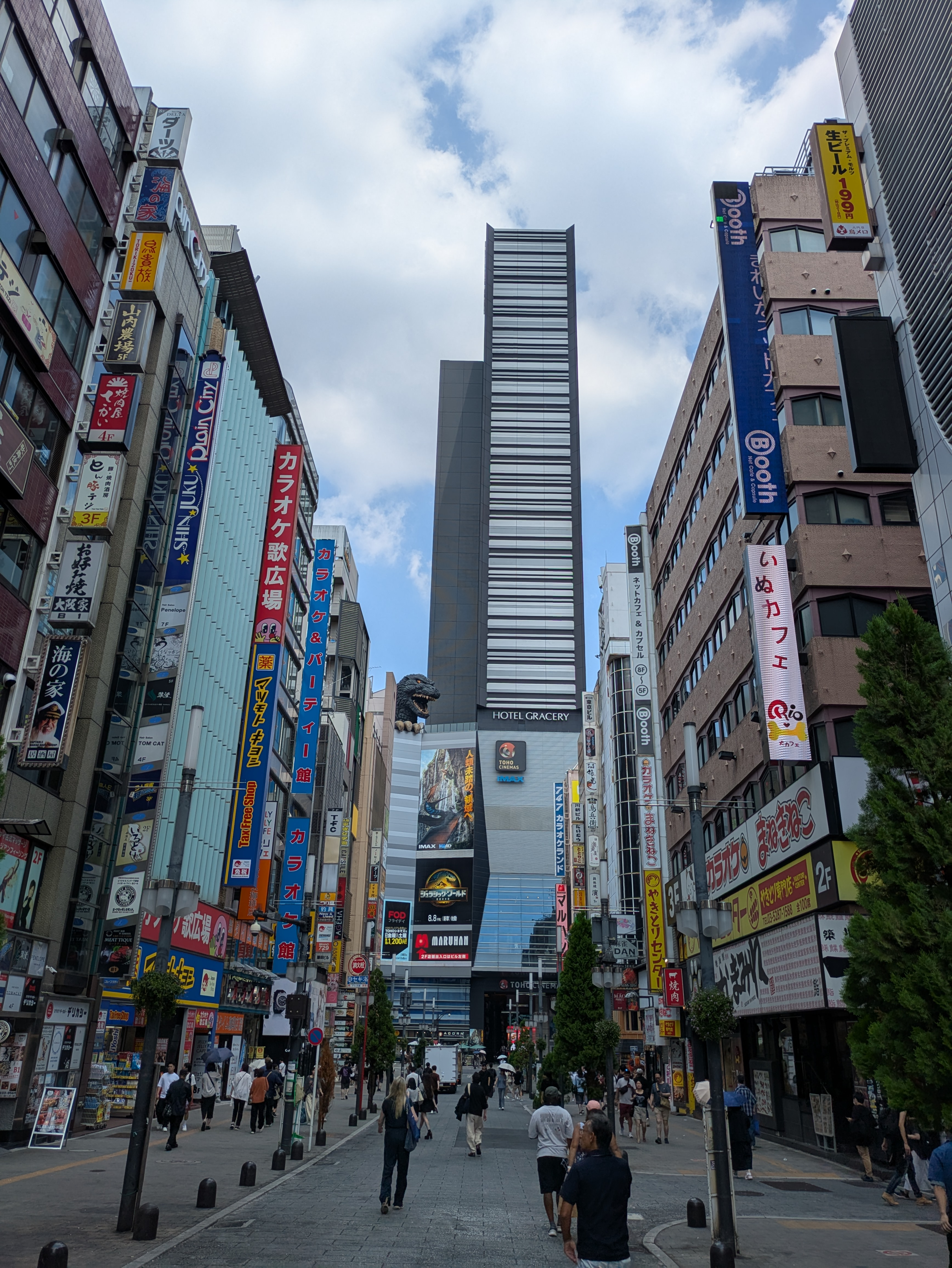
CentralRoad （20250824）

== See also ==
- Jūsō, Osaka
- Kyabakura Union
- Tobita Shinchi, Osaka
