= 2011 in Jewels =

Mixed martial arts events

Information
- First date: May 14, 2011
- Last date: December 17, 2011

Events
- Total events: 4

Fights
- Title fights: 61

Chronology
2010 in Jewels	2011 in Jewels	2012 in Jewels

The year 2011 is the 4th year in the history of Jewels, a mixed martial arts promotion based in Japan. In 2011 Jewels held 4 events beginning with, Jewels 13th Ring & 14th Ring.

== Title fights ==
Title fights in 2011
Weight class				Method	Round	Time	Event	Notes
Strawweight	Ayaka Hamasaki (c)	def.	Seo Hee Ham	TKO (Corner Stoppage)	1	5:00	Jewels 17th Ring	(Note: For the Jewels Strawweight Championship.)

== Events list ==
#	Event Title	Date	Arena	Location	Attendance
17	Jewels 17th Ring	December 17, 2011	Shinjuku Face	Tokyo, Japan	370
16	Jewels 16th Ring	September 11, 2011	Shin-Kiba 1st Ring	Tokyo, Japan	822
15	Jewels 15th Ring	July 9, 2011	Shinjuku Face	Tokyo, Japan	426
14	Jewels 13th Ring & 14th Ring (Note: Jewels 14th Ring was originally an independent event planned for July 9, 2011. Jewels merged both events in a single date after the cancellation of Jewels 12th Ring.)	May 14, 2011	Shin-Kiba 1st Ring	Tokyo, Japan	328 / 324
-	Jewels 12th Ring	March 11, 2011	Shinjuku Face	Tokyo, Japan	cancelled (Note: The event was cancelled a few hours before the start due to the 2011 Tohoku earthquake and tsunami.)

== Jewels 12th Ring ==
Jewels 12th Ring was a cancelled event that would have been held on March 11, 2011 at Shinjuku Face in Tokyo, Japan.

== Jewels 13th Ring & 14th Ring ==
Jewels 13th Ring and Jewels 14th Ring were events held on May 14, 2011 at Shin-Kiba 1st Ring in Tokyo, Japan.

=== Jewels 13th Ring Results ===
Main Card
Weight class				Method	Round	Time	Notes
-61 kg	Bolormaa Erdenebileg	def.	Chisa Yonezawa	TKO (Doctor Stoppage)	1	5:00
-50 kg	Megumi Morioka	def.	Asami Higa	Decision (Unanimous)	2	5:00
-48 kg	Yukiko Seki	def.	Yuka Okumura	Decision (Split)	2	5:00
-54 kg	Sadae Numata	def.	Anna Saito	Technical Submission (Armbar)	2	2:10
Jewels Grappling Rules
-49 kg	Tamaki Usui	def.	Nana Ichikawa	submission (triangle choke)	1	0:35
-50 kg	Satoko Kameda	def.	Kayoko Yamazaki	submission (heel hook)	1	1:14
Jewels Special Rules
-61 kg	Esui	def.	Chisa Yonezawa	TKO (doctor stoppage)	1	5:00
Jewels Kickboxing Rules
-53.52 kg	Miku Hayashi	def.	Rio Kamikaze	unanimous decision (30-29, 30-29, 29-28)	3	2:00
-47 kg	Madoka Okada	vs.	Momoka Mandokoro	Majority draw (30-29, 30-30, 29-29)	3	2:00
-57.15 kg	Kozue Nagashima	def.	Yukimi Kamikaze	unanimous decision (30-29, 30-29, 30-29)	3	3:00

=== Jewels 14th Ring Results ===
Main Card
Weight class				Method	Round	Time	Notes
-48 kg	Naho Sugiyama	def.	Misaki Takimoto	Submission (Rear-Naked Choke)	1	4:06
-54 kg	Mika Nagano	def.	Emi Murata	Submission (Armbar)	1	1:40
-48 kg	Sachiko Yamamoto	def.	Miyoko Kusaka	Decision (Unanimous)	2	5:00
Jewels Grappling Rules
-50 kg	Kayoko Yamazaki	def.	O Quin Mei	Time limit draw after 4:00.	1	4:00
-54 kg	Emi Tomimatsu	def.	Mayumi Suzuki	submission (rear-naked choke)	2	0:49
-56.5 kg	Ricaco Yuasa	def.	Kazue Matake	unanimous decision	2	4:00
-54 kg	Mizuki Inoue	def.	Natsuka	unanimous decision (30-28, 30-28, 30-27)	3	2:00
lightweight	Ayaka Hamasaki	def.	Saori Ishioka	split decision	2	4:00

== Jewels 15th Ring ==
Jewels 15th Ring was an event held on July 9, 2011 at Shinjuku Face in Tokyo, Japan.

=== Results ===
Main Card - Jewels Special Rules (pound allowed)
Weight class				Method	Round	Time	Notes
-52 kg	Yuka Tsuji	def.	Saori Ishioka	Decision (Unanimous)	2	5:00
-52 kg	Seo Hee Ham	def.	Mei Yamaguchi	Decision (Unanimous)	2	5:00
Jewels Official Rules
-52 kg	Megumi Fujii	def.	Mika Nagano	Decision (Unanimous)	2	5:00
Jewels Special Rules (pound allowed)
-61 kg	Hitomi Akano	def.	Roxanne Modafferi	Decision (Unanimous)	2	5:00
-65 kg	Hiroko Yamanaka	def.	Bolormaa Erdenebileg	Submission (Armbar)	2	2:20
Jewels Kickboxing Rules
-53.52 kg	Miku Hayashi	def.	Anna Saito	TKO (knees)	2	1:22
Jewels vs. Valkyrie - Jewels Special Rules (pound allowed)
-52 kg	Kyoko Takabayashi	def.	Celine Haga	Decision (Unanimous)	2	5:00
Jewels vs. Valkyrie - Jewels Special Rules
-48 kg	Kikuyo Ishikawa	def.	Sachiko Yamamoto	Decision (Unanimous)	2	5:00
Jewels Kickboxing Rules
-60 kg	Chikako WSR	def.	Hanako Nakamori	decision (3-0)	3	2:00
-50 kg	Tomoko SP	def.	Kaoru Chatani	decision (3-0)	3	2:00
Jewels Official Rules
-48 kg	Miyoko Kusaka	def.	Yuka Okumura	Decision (Unanimous)	2	5:00
Opening card - Jewels Amateur Kickboxing
-53 kg	Seira Aragaki	def.	Wano Sato	decision (3-0)	2	2:00
-44 kg	Saya Ito	def.	Chihiro Kira	decision (3-0)	2	2:00
Opening card - Jewels Amateur Rules
-50 kg	Kayoko Yamazaki	vs.	O Quin Mei	Draw	1	4:00
-49 kg	Tamaki Usui	def.	Nana Ichikawa	Submission (Armbar)	1	0:14

== Jewels 16th Ring ==
Jewels 16th Ring was an event held on September 11, 2011 at Shin-Kiba 1st Ring in Tokyo, Japan.

=== Results ===
Main Card - Jewels Official Rules
Weight class				Method	Round	Time	Notes
-54 kg	Ayaka Hamasaki	def.	Mizuki Inoue	Decision (Unanimous)	2	5:00
Jewels Kickboxing Rules
-57.15 kg	Kozue Nagashima	def.	Kim Sung Eun	KO (knee to the body)	2	0:34
Jewels Featherweight Queen GP 2011 First Round
Featherweight	Naho Sugiyama	def.	Ayumi Saito	Decision (Unanimous)	2	5:00
Featherweight	Kikuyo Ishikawa	def.	Yasuko Tamada	Decision (Unanimous)	2	5:00
Featherweight	Misaki Takimoto	def.	Miyoko Kusaka	Decision (Unanimous)	2	5:00
Featherweight	Yukiko Seki	def.	Sachiko Yamamoto	Decision (Unanimous)	2	5:00
Jewels Kickboxing Rules
-58 kg	Satoko Ozawa	def.	Chikako WSR	decision (2-0)	3	2:00
Jewels Official Rules
lightweight	Emi Tomimatsu	def.	Celine Haga	Decision (Unanimous)	2	5:00
lightweight	Yuko Oya	def.	Akiko Naito	Decision (Split)	2	5:00
-54 kg	Rina Tomita	def.	Anna Saito	Technical Submission (Armbar)	1	4:24
Opening card - Jewels U-15 Kickboxing Tournament Semi-Final
-46 kg	Saya Ito	def.	Ryoka Yasuoka	decision (3-0)	2	2:00
-46 kg	Chihiro Imoto	def.	Mili Sasaki	decision (3-0)	2	2:00
Jewels Amateur Rules
-48 kg	Tamaki Usui	def.	Nana Ichikawa	Submission (Armbar)	1	2:01

== Jewels 17th Ring ==
Jewels 17th Ring was an event held on December 17, 2011 at Shinjuku Face in Tokyo, Japan.

=== Results ===
Main Card - Jewels Lightweight Queen Championship
Weight class				Method	Round	Time	Notes
Strawweight	Ayaka Hamasaki (c)	def.	Seo Hee Ham	TKO (Corner Stoppage)	1	5:00	(Note: For the Jewels Strawweight Championship.)
Jewels Featherweight Queen GP 2011 Final
-48 kg	Naho Sugiyama	def.	Misaki Takimoto	Technical Submission (Armbar)	1	4:09
Jewels Official Rules
-52 kg	Mei Yamaguchi	def.	Mika Nagano	Decision (Split)	2	5:00
-52 kg	Emi Fujino	def.	Celine Haga	Decision (Unanimous)	2	5:00
Jewels Kickboxing Rules
-52 kg	Miku Hayashi	def.	Kanomu Shisso	unanimous decision (30-28, 30-28, 30-28)	3	2:00
-49 kg	Mai	def.	Miyako Mitsuhori	unanimous decision (30-28, 30-28, 30-29)	3	2:00
Jewels Official Rules
-52 kg	Emi Tomimatsu	def.	Rina Tomita	Decision (Split)	2	5:00
Jewels Featherweight Queen GP 2011 Reserve Bout
Featherweight	Sachiko Yamamoto	def.	Yasuko Tamada	Decision (Split)	2	5:00
Jewels Featherweight Queen GP 2011 Semi-Final B
Featherweight	Naho Sugiyama	def.	Kikuyo Ishikawa	Decision (Split)	2	5:00
Jewels Featherweight Queen GP 2011 Semi-Final A
Featherweight	Misaki Takimoto	def.	Yukiko Seki	Decision (Unanimous)	2	5:00
Jewels Official Rules
-48 kg	Shino VanHoose	def.	Asami Higa	Decision (Unanimous)	2	5:00
-54 kg	Yuka Okumura	def.	Anna Saito	Submission (Heel Hook)	1	4:41
Opening card - Jewels Under-15 Kickboxing Tournament Final
-46 kg	Chihiro Imoto	def.	Saya Ito	majority decision (20-19, 20-19, 19-19)	2	2:00
Jewels Amateur Rules
	Yukari Yamaguchi	def.	Nana Ichikawa	Technical Submission (Armbar)	1	1:20
Jewels Amateur Kickboxing
-48 kg	Mili Sasaki	def.	Fuka Saito	majority decision (20-20, 20-19, 20-19)	2	2:00
