= 2010 in Jewels =

Mixed martial arts events

Information
- First date: January 31, 2010
- Last date: December 17, 2010

Events
- Total events: 6

Fights
- Total fights: 42
- Title fights: 1

Chronology
2009 in Jewels	2010 in Jewels	2011 in Jewels

The year 2010 is the 3rd year in the history of Jewels, a mixed martial arts promotion based in Japan. In 2010 Jewels held 6 events beginning with, Jewels - Rough Stone: Second Ring.

== Title fights ==
Title fights in 2010
Weight class				Method	Round	Time	Event	Notes
Strawweight	Ayaka Hamasaki	def.	Seo Hee Ham	Decision (Unanimous)	2	5:00	Jewels 11th Ring	(Note: For the Jewels Strawweight Championship.)

== Events list ==
#	Event title	Date	Arena	Location	Attendance
13	Jewels 11th Ring	December 17, 2010	Korakuen Hall	Tokyo, Japan	1216
12	Jewels 10th Ring	October 10, 2010	Shin-Kiba 1st Ring	Tokyo, Japan	464
11	Jewels 9th Ring	July 31, 2010	Shinjuku Face	Tokyo, Japan	578
10	Jewels 8th Ring	May 23, 2010	Shin-Kiba 1st Ring	Tokyo, Japan	438
9	Jewels 7th Ring	March 19, 2010	Shinjuku Face	Tokyo, Japan	696
8	Jewels - Rough Stone: Second Ring	January 31, 2010	Caesar Gym Shin-Koiwa	Tokyo, Japan	

== Jewels - Rough Stone: Second Ring ==
Jewels - Rough Stone: Second Ring was an event held on January 31, 2010 at Caesar Gym Shin-Koiwa in Tokyo, Japan.

=== Results ===
Main Card
Weight class				Method	Round	Time	Notes
	Hiroko Kitamura	def.	Yoko Kagoshima	Decision (Unanimous)	2	5:00

== Jewels 7th Ring ==
Jewels 7th Ring was an event held on March 19, 2010 at Shinjuku Face in Tokyo, Japan.

=== Results ===
Main Card
Weight class				Method	Round	Time	Notes
	Hiroko Yamanaka	def.	Hitomi Akano	Decision (Split)	2	5:00
	Mika Nagano	def.	Mai Ichii	Decision (Unanimous)	2	5:00
	Miki Morifuji	def.	Shizuka Sugiyama	Decision (Unanimous)	2	5:00
	Hiroko Kitamura	def.	Celine Haga	Technical Submission (Kimura)	1	2:04
	Miyoko Kusaka	def.	Kikuyo Ishikawa	Decision (Split)	2	5:00
	Sakura Nomura	def.	Yoko Kagoshima	Technical Submission (Armbar)	2	4:35

== Jewels 8th Ring ==
Jewels 8th Ring was an event held on May 23, 2010 at Shin-Kiba 1st Ring in Tokyo, Japan.

=== Results ===
Main Card
Weight class				Method	Round	Time	Notes
	Saori Ishioka	def.	Mai Ichii	Submission (Armbar)	2	2:41
	Hiroko Yamanaka	def.	Atsuko Emoto	Decision (Unanimous)	2	5:00
	Celine Haga	def.	Mika Nagano	Decision (Unanimous)	2	5:00
	Miyo Yoshida	def.	Yoko Kagoshima	TKO (Punches)	1	3:30
	Yuko Oya	def.	Harumi Harumi	Technical Submission (Armbar)	1	3:45

== Jewels 9th Ring ==
Jewels 9th Ring was an event held on July 31, 2010 at Shinjuku Face in Tokyo, Japan.

=== Results ===
Main Card
Weight class				Method	Round	Time	Notes
	Sakura Nomura	def.	Saori Ishioka	Decision (Unanimous)	2	5:00
	Seo Hee Ham	def.	Mai Ichii	Decision (Unanimous)	2	5:00
	Mika Nagano	def.	Celine Haga	Submission (Armbar)	1	2:52
	Ayaka Hamasaki	def.	Han Sol Lee	Submission (Keylock)	1	0:48
	Misaki Takimoto	def.	Lisa Newton	Submission (Rear-Naked Choke)	1	2:10
	Mayumi Aoki	def.	Bolormaa Erdenebileg	Technical Submission (Armbar)	1	4:34
	Yukiko Seki	def.	Miyoko Kusaka	Submission (Rear-Naked Choke)	2	0:50
	Yuko Oya	def.	Misaki Ozawa	Submission (Armbar)	2	2:27
	Emi Murata	def.	Harumi Harumi	Submission (Armbar)	1	1:08

== Jewels 10th Ring ==
Jewels 10th Ring was an event held on October 10, 2010 at Shin-Kiba 1st Ring in Tokyo, Japan.

=== Results ===
Main Card
Weight class				Method	Round	Time	Notes
	Miki Morifuji	def.	Aya Koyama	Submission (Rear-Naked Choke)	1	1:51
	Mai Ichii	def.	Miyo Yoshida	Decision (Unanimous)	2	5:00
	Hiroko Kitamura	def.	Rina Tomita	Decision (Unanimous)	2	5:00
	Yukiko Seki	def.	Yoko Kagoshima	Decision (Unanimous)	2	5:00
	Kikuyo Ishikawa	def.	Misaki Ozawa	Submission (Armbar)	1	2:24
	Mizuki Inoue	def.	Emi Murata	Submission (Armbar)	2	2:58
	Asako Saioka	def.	Harumi Harumi	KO (Punch)	1	2:31
	Saori Ishioka	def.	Celine Haga	Decision (Unanimous)	2	5:00
	Asami Higa	vs.	Sachiko Togashi	Draw (Time Limit)	1	4:00

== Jewels 11th Ring ==
Jewels 11th Ring was an event held on December 17, 2010 at Korakuen Hall in Tokyo, Japan.

=== Results ===
Main Card
Weight class				Method	Round	Time	Notes
Strawweight	Ayaka Hamasaki	def.	Seo Hee Ham	Decision (Unanimous)	2	5:00	(Note: For the Jewels Strawweight Championship.)
	Hiroko Yamanaka	def.	Molly Helsel	TKO (Punches)	2	3:12
	Bolormaa Erdenebileg	def.	Shizuka Sugiyama	TKO (Corner Stoppage)	2	0:13
	Miki Morifuji	def.	Kinuka Sasaki	Decision (Unanimous)	2	5:00
	Saori Ishioka	def.	Yuko Oya	Submission (Armbar)	1	2:14
	Seo Hee Ham	def.	Mika Nagano	Decision (Split)	2	5:00
	Ayaka Hamasaki	def.	Sakura Nomura	Decision (Unanimous)	2	5:00
	Kikuyo Ishikawa	def.	Yukiko Seki	Decision (Split)	2	5:00
	Hiroko Kitamura	def.	Mai Ichii	Decision (Unanimous)	2	5:00
	Mizuki Inoue	def.	Asako Saioka	Technical Submission (Armbar)	1	2:59
	Miyoko Kusaka	def.	Asami Higa	Submission (Scarf Hold Armlock)	2	0:43
	Emi Murata	def.	Anna Saito	Submission (Triangle Armbar)	1	1:03

== See also ==
- Jewels
