= Jewels 13th Ring & 14th Ring =

Mixed martial arts events in 2011

- The poster for Jewels 13th Ring & 14th Ring
- Promotion: Jewels
- Date: May 14, 2011
- Venue: Shin-Kiba 1st Ring
- City: Koto, Tokyo, Japan
- Attendance: 328 (13th Ring); 324 (14th Ring)

Event chronology
Jewels 12th Ring	Jewels 13th Ring & 14th Ring	Jewels 15th Ring

Jewels 13th Ring and Jewels 14th Ring are two mixed martial arts (MMA) events combined in a single date and location held by promotion Jewels. The events took place on May 14, 2011 at Shin-Kiba 1st Ring in Koto, Tokyo, Japan.

== Background ==
Due to the 2011 Tōhoku earthquake and tsunami, Jewels 12th Ring was canceled. As a result of this, Jewels decided to change their planned schedule in order to combine Jewels 13th Ring and Jewels 14th Ring into a single date and location, the first one in the afternoon and the second one in the evening, and serve as fundraisers for Japan's earthquake relief and reconstruction efforts. The location and date originally planned for Jewels 14th Ring will be used for Jewels 15th Ring. As part of the relief efforts of the 2011 Tōhoku earthquake and tsunami, 13th Ring and 14th Ring are part of the Fight for Japan charity, a collaborative effort from several Japanese combat sports organizations.

The first four bouts announced were two kickboxing matches and two MMA matches on April 13, 2011. In a notable development, Yasuko Mogi, producer of MMA promotion Valkyrie, was present during the press conference to announce that the MMA bouts would be part of the theme Jewels vs Valkyrie, where fighters representing their respective promotions would face each other.

On April 23, 2011, Jewels added Mika Nagano vs. Emi Murata to the 14th Ring card and announced three more bouts for the 13th Ring card.

Four more matches were announced on May 1, 2011, two MMA bouts for 13th Ring and two grappling bouts for 14th Ring.

On May 6, 2011, Jewels added one shoot boxing match and one more grappling match to 14th Ring.

== Results ==
=== 13th Ring card ===
- Opening match 1: Jewels grappling rules -49 kg bout, 4:00 / 1 round

(Japan) Nana Ichikawa (Freelance) vs. (Japan) Tamaki Usui (Reversal Gym Tokyo Standout)

Usui defeated Ichikawa via submission (triangle choke) at 0:35 of round 1.

- Opening match 2: Jewels grappling rules -50 kg bout, 4:00 / 1 round

(Japan) Satoko Kameda (P's Lab Yokohama) vs. (Japan) Kayoko Yamazaki (Paraestra Kashiwa)

Kameda defeated Yamazaki via submission (heel hook) at 1:14 of round 1.

- 1st match: Jewels official rules -54 kg bout, 5:00 / 2 rounds

(Japan) Anna Saito (Fight Chix) vs. (Japan) Sadae Suzumura (Cobra Kai MMA Dojo)

Suzumura defeated Saito via technical submission (armbar) at 2:10 of round 2.

- 2nd match: Jewels official rules -48 kg bout, 5:00 / 2 rounds

Yukiko Seki (Fight Chix) vs. Yuka Okumura (Soul Fighters Japan)

Seki defeated Okumura via split decision.

- 3rd match: Jewels vs Valkyrie, Jewels official rules -50 kg bout, 5:00 / 2 rounds

(Japan) Asami Higa (S-Keep) vs. (Japan) Megumi Morioka (Wajutsu Keishukai Iwate)

Morioka defeated Higa via unanimous decision.

- 4th match: Jewels vs Valkyrie, Jewels special rules (pound allowed) -61 kg bout, 5:00 / 2 rounds

(Mongolia) Esui (Smash Shoji Dojo) vs. (Japan) Chisa Yonezawa (Cobra Kai MMA Dojo)

Esui defeated Yonezawa via TKO (doctor stoppage) at 5:00 of round 1.

- 5th match: Jewels kickboxing rules -53.52 kg bout, 2:00 / 3 rounds

(Japan) Miku Hayashi (Bungeling Bay Spirit) vs. (Japan) Rio Kamikaze (Kamikaze Juku)

Hayashi defeated Kamikaze via unanimous decision (30-29, 30-29, 29-28).

- 6th match: Jewels kickboxing rules -47 kg bout, 2:00 / 3 rounds

(Japan) Madoka Okada (Angura) vs. (Japan) Momoka Mandokoro (T.B. Nation)

Majority draw (30-29, 30-30, 29-29) after three rounds.

- 7th match: Jewels kickboxing rules -57.15 kg bout, 3:00 / 3 rounds

(Japan) Kozue Nagashima (y-park) vs. (Japan) Yukimi Kamikaze (Kamikaze Juku)

Nagashima defeated Kamikaze via unanimous decision (30-29, 30-29, 30-29).

=== 14th Ring card ===
- Opening match: Jewels grappling rules -50 kg bout, 4:00 / 1 round

(Japan) Kayoko Yamazaki (Paraestra Kashiwa) vs. (China) O Quin Mei (Core)

Time limit draw after 4:00.

- 1st match: Jewels grappling rules -54 kg bout, 4:00 / 2 rounds

(Japan) Emi Tomimatsu (Paraestra Matsudo) vs. (Japan) Mayumi Suzuki (Iwaki K-3)

Tomimatsu defeated Suzuki via submission (rear-naked choke) at 0:49 of round 2.

- 2nd match: Jewels vs Valkyrie, Jewels grappling rules -56.5 kg bout, 4:00 / 2 rounds

(Japan) Ricaco Yuasa (Pogona Club) vs. (Japan) Kazue Matake (Wajyutsu Keisyukai Tokyo)

Yuasa defeated Matake via unanimous decision.

- 3rd match: Jewels shoot boxing rules -54 kg bout, 2:00 / 3 rounds

(Japan) Mizuki Inoue (White Heart Karate Association) vs. (Japan) Natsuka (Shoot Boxing / Risshikaikan)

Inoue defeated Natsuka via unanimous decision (30-28, 30-28, 30-27).

- 4th match: Jewels vs Valkyrie, Jewels official rules -48 kg bout, 5:00 / 2 rounds

(Japan) Miyoko Kusaka (Grabaka) vs. (Japan) Sachiko Yamamoto (Angura)

Yamamoto defeated Kusaka via unanimous decision.

- 5th match: Jewels official rules -54 kg bout, 5:00 / 2 rounds

(Japan) Mika Nagano (Core) vs. (Japan) Emi Murata (AACC)

Nagano defeated Murata via submission (armbar) at 1:40 of round 1.

- 6th match: Jewels grappling rules lightweight bout, 4:00 / 2 rounds

(Japan) Ayaka Hamasaki (AACC) vs. (Japan) Saori Ishioka (Zendokai Koganei)

Hamasaki defeated Ishioka via split decision.

- 7th match: Jewels vs Valkyrie, Jewels special rules (pound allowed) -48 kg bout, 5:00 / 2 rounds

(Japan) Misaki Takimoto (Zendokai Yokohama) vs. (Japan) Naho Sugiyama (Wajutsu Keishukai A3)

Sugiyama defeated Takimoto via submission (rear-naked choke) at 4:06 of round 1.

== Jewels vs. Valkyrie result ==
Valkyrie defeated Jewels 3–2 in the best of five series.
