= Jewels 12th Ring =

Mixed martial arts event in 2011

- The poster for Jewels 12th Ring
- Promotion: Jewels
- Date: March 11, 2011
- Venue: Shinjuku Face
- City: Kabukicho, Tokyo, Japan

Event chronology
Jewels 11th Ring	Jewels 12th Ring	Jewels 13th Ring & 14th Ring

Jewels 12th Ring was a planned mixed martial arts (MMA) to be held by MMA promotion Jewels. The event was planned to be held on March 11, 2011 at Shinjuku Face in Kabukicho, Tokyo, Japan but it was cancelled a few hours before the start due to the 2011 Tōhoku earthquake and tsunami.

== Background ==
The first two bouts of the event were disclosed on February 8, 2011. Four more bouts were announced on February 17, 2011, including the addition of American fighter Lisa Ellis as an opponent for Jewels lightweight champion Ayaka Hamasaki in a special rules non-title bout. The rest of the card was revealed on March 3, 2011, which included the debut in MMA of South Korean boxer Ji Yun Kim and a kickboxing match. It was announced the next day that Ellis had suffered an injury in training and that fellow Bellator season three semi-finalist Jessica Aguilar would face Hamasaki instead.

The weigh-ins took place on March 10, 2011, with American fighter Danielle West missing weight and being penalized with a red card (point deduction) in her bout against Mongolian Esui. Fighters Sakura Nomura and Kim did not take part in the weigh-ins and instead were going to be weighed on the day of their match.

== Announced card ==
- 1st match: Jewels official rules -50 kg bout, 5:00 / 2 R

Miyoko Kusaka (50.0 kilograms (110.2 lb), Grabaka Gym) vs. Yuka Okumura (49.5 kilograms (109 lb), Soul Fighters Japan)

- 2nd match: Jewels official rules lightweight bout, 5:00 / 2 R

(Japan) Rina Tomita (51.8 kilograms (114 lb), AACC) vs. (Japan) Sadae Suzumura (51.9 kilograms (114 lb), Cobra Kai MMA Dojo)

- 3rd match: Jewels special rules (pound allowed) -65 kg bout, 5:00 / 2 R

(Mongolia) Esui (64.6 kilograms (142 lb), Smash Alley Gym) vs. (United States) Danielle West (66.0 kilograms (145.5 lb), Fuzion MMA)

- 4th match: Jewels kickboxing rules -52.16 kg bout, 5:00 / 2 R

(Japan) Miku Hayashi (52.1 kilograms (115 lb), Bungeling Bay Spirit) vs. (Japan) Suzuna Nakamura (51.7 kilograms (114 lb), Sakigake Juku)

- 5th match: Jewels official rules -62 kg bout, 5:00 / 2 R

(Japan) Shizuka Sugiyama (62.0 kilograms (136.7 lb), Zendokai Yokohama) vs. (Japan) Mayumi Aoki (61.7 kilograms (136 lb), Gamurannac)

- 6th match: Jewels official rules -58 kg bout, 5:00 / 2 R

(Japan) Sakura Nomura (Club Barbarian Impact) vs. (South Korea) Ji Yun Kim (CMA Korea Team Posse)

- 7th match: Jewels official rules -54 kg bout, 5:00 / 2 R

(Japan) Mika Nagano (53.9 kilograms (119 lb), Core) vs. (Japan) Emi Murata (53.6 kilograms (118 lb), AACC)

- 8th match: Jewels special rules (pound allowed) lightweight bout, 5:00 / 2 R

(Japan) Ayaka Hamasaki (52.0 kilograms (114.6 lb), AACC) vs. (United States) Jessica Aguilar (American Top Team)
