= Jewels 15th Ring =

Mixed martial arts event in 2011

- The poster for Jewels 15th Ring
- Promotion: Jewels
- Date: July 9, 2011
- Venue: Shinjuku Face
- City: Kabukicho, Tokyo, Japan
- Attendance: 872

Event chronology
Jewels 13th Ring & 14th Ring	Jewels 15th Ring	Jewels 16th Ring

Jewels 15th Ring was a mixed martial arts (MMA) event held by promotion Jewels on July 9, 2011 at Shinjuku Face in Kabukicho, Tokyo, Japan.

As in the previous Jewels event, 15th Ring featured a Jewels vs. Valkyrie theme, pitting fighters from both promotions in four bouts that ended with two victories for each promotion. Former Valkyrie featherweight champion Yuka Tsuji made her return to active competition after having surgery to correct shoulder and knee injuries.

== Background ==
Yuka Tsuji, who was returning after 17 months, was booked to face Saori Ishioka under Jewels special rules (ground-and-pound allowed) as the first bout announced for the event on June 1, 2011. On June 6, 2011, Jewels added three more fights to the card; Valkyrie featherweight champion Mei Yamaguchi against South Korean kickboxing specialist Seo Hee Ham, Hitomi Akano versus American Roxanne Modafferi and Hiroko Yamanaka against Mongolian Esui, all of which would be contested under Jewels special rules.

Jewels next announced on June 20, 2011 a rematch between Bellator tournament finalist Megumi Fujii and Jewels promotional star Mika Nagano, along with matches between Valkyrie's featherweight contender Kyoko Takabayashi and Norwegian Celine Haga, 2010 Jewels 48 kg Rough Stone Grand Prix winner Kikuyo Ishikawa versus Sachiko Yamamoto, Miyoko Kusaka versus Yuka Okumura and two kickboxing bouts pitting Miku Hayashi against Anna Saito, and Chikako WSR against Hanako Nakamori.

Three more fights, a kickboxing bout and two amateur rules bouts, were added to the event on June 30, 2011 and the final two kickboxing bouts, with top Japanese female prospects Saya Ito - a 12-year-old dubbed the Muay Thai Genius - in one of them and 14-year-old kickboxing champion Seira Aragaki in the other, were added to the card on July 5, 2011.

During the weigh-ins, which took place on July 8, 2011, all fighters made weight on their first attempt with the exception Ham, who made weight on her second attempt.

== Event ==
The first bout of the opening card ended quickly as Tamaki Usui secured an armbar against Nana Ichikawa that forced Ichikawa to submit in 14 seconds. The second bout ended in a draw after neither Kayoko Yamazaki nor O Quin Mei were able to win within the limited time, and no decision was given since the fight was contested under amateur rules.

In the first kickboxing match of the night, contested under amateur rules, Chihiro Kira was defeated via unanimous decision by Saya Ito, who was the more effective striker during the two rounds and scored her 56th win. The next amateur rules kickboxing bout of the event was won by Seira Aragaki, who defeated Wano Sato by unanimous decision after two rounds.

In the first bout of the main card, Miyoko Kusaka was able to use her grappling skills to defeat Yuka Okumura by unanimous decision despite Okumura nearly ending the fight in the final seconds of round two.

In the next two bouts of the night, both kickboxing matches, Tomoko SP defeated Kaoru Chatani and Chikako WSR defeated Hanako Nakamori. Both wins came via unanimous decision after three rounds.

The first Jewels vs. Valkyrie bout was won by Jewels' Kikuyo Ishikawa, who defeated Sachiko Yamamoto via unanimous decision by avoiding Yamamoto's takedown attempts and delivering the most effective strikes, giving Jewels the advantage 1-0.

In the first bout contested under special rules, Celina Haga (representing Jewels) was defeated by Kyoko Takabayashi (representing Valkyrie) via unanimous decision after two rounds, bringing the score to 1-1 in the Jewels vs. Valkyrie competition. Haga had the superior striking at the beginning of the fight, but Takabayashi managed to control the fight on the ground to earn the decision.

The last kickboxing bout of the event matched Miku Hayashi against Anna Saito. Hayashi won via TKO at 1:22 of round two by landing damaging knees to Saito's body after Saito had a standing count earlier.

During the 7th match of the main card, Hiroko Yamanaka battered Esui with punches before defeating her with an armbar submission at 2:20 of the second round. The bout was characterized by the different striking styles of both fighters, reminiscent of their trainers, Yamanaka's Kuniyoshi Hironaka and Esui's Tatsuya Iwasaki, which showed Yamanaka as the superior striker before she scored a takedown and ended the fight.

In a match originally scheduled to be contested at World Victory Road Presents: Soul of Fight, Hitomi Akano won via unanimous decision over Roxanne Modafferi after two rounds. The Strikeforce veterans exchanged strikes and submission attempts during both rounds, with Modafferi seemingly winning the first round and Akano the second. In the end, though, Akano was awarded the unanimous decision victory in what was a close and competitive fight.

Before the start of the ninth match of the main card, it was announced that, starting on September 11, 2011 and ending on December 17, 2011, Jewels would hold an eight-woman featherweight tournament to crown the first Jewels Featherweight Queen Champion.

In the next bout, Megumi Fujii defeated Mika Nagano via unanimous decision after two rounds. In the first round, Fujii used strikes and forced Nagano to clinch. This proved ineffective for Nagano, however, as Fujii connected with knees to the body and Nagano tried unsuccessfully for an armbar. Fujii continued to dominate Nagano on the ground during the first round and once again dominated all aspects of the fight during the second; nearly finishing the fight with a toe hold.

The co-main event and third Jewels vs. Valkyrie bout was contested under Jewels special rules between Seo Hee Ham (fighting for Jewels) and Mei Yamaguchi (fighting for Valkyrie), with Ham defeating Valkyrie's champion via unanimous decision after two rounds. In the first round, Yamaguchi and Ham exchanged punches and kicks, with Ham gaining the advantage in the striking exchange. Yamaguchi tried to take the fight to the ground, but Ham escaped and remained on her feet. During the second round, Yamaguchi tried to match Ham in the striking exchanges, but was forced to backpedal. After escaping from an armbar attempt, Ham delivered hammerfists from above before both fighters were stood up by the referee. Yamaguchi attempted a leg lock, which Ham defended by throwing more hammerfists. Yamaguchi then tried to reverse position or stand up, but she was unable to do anything significant before the final bell. With Ham's victory, Jewels moved to 2-1.

In the final bout of the night, Yuka Tsuji defeated Saori Ishioka after two rounds via a dominant unanimous decision. Tsuji took Ishioka down at will and was able to defend without problems from Ishioka's submission attempts during the first round. In the second round, Tsuji tried for several submissions. Ishioka managed to escape, but was unable to mount any significant offense. With Tsuji's victory, the Jewels vs. Valkyrie competition ended 2-2.

== Results ==
=== Opening card ===
- 1st opening fight: Jewels amateur rules -49 kg, 4:00 / 1 round

(Japan) Nana Ichikawa (freelance) vs. (Japan) Tamaki Usui (Reversal Gym Tokyo Standout)

Usui defeated Ichikawa by submission (armbar) at 0:14 of round 1.

- 2nd opening fight: Jewels amateur rules -50 kg, 4:00 / 1 round

(Japan) Kayoko Yamazaki (Paraestra Kashiwa) vs. (China) O Quin Mei (Core)

Draw (time limit) after 4:00.

- 3rd opening fight: Jewels amateur kickboxing rules -44 kg, 2:00 / 2 rounds

(Japan) Saya Ito (Shobukai) vs. (Japan) Chihiro Kira (Kaijuku)

Ito defeated Kira by decision (3-0).

- 4th opening fight: Jewels amateur kickboxing rules -53 kg, 2:00 / 2 rounds

(Japan) Seira Aragaki (WSR Warabi Gym) vs. (Japan) Wano Sato (Shinkoh Muythai Gym)

Aragaki defeated Sato by decision (3-0).

=== Main card ===
- 1st match: Jewels official rules -48 kg bout, 5:00 / 2 rounds

Miyoko Kusaka (Grabaka) vs Yuka Okumura (Soul Fighters Japan)

Kusaka defeated Okumura by decision (3-0).

- 2nd match: Jewels kickboxing rules -50 kg bout, 2:00 / 3 rounds

(Japan) Tomoko SP (WSR Fairtex Gym) vs. (Japan) Kaoru Chatani (Seishikai)

Tomoko SP defeated Chatani by decision (3-0).

- 3rd match: Jewels kickboxing rules -60 kg bout, 2:00 / 3 rounds

(Japan) Chikako WSR (WSR Fairtex Gym) vs. (Japan) Hanako Nakamori (JWP)

Chikako WSR defeated Nakamori by decision (3-0).

- 4th match: Jewels vs. Valkyrie, Jewels official rules -48 kg bout, 5:00 / 2 rounds

(Japan) Kikuyo Ishikawa (Reversal Gym Yokohama Grand Slam, Jewels) vs. (Japan) Sachiko Yamamoto (Angura, Valkyrie)

Ishikawa defeated Yamamoto by decision (3-0).

- 5th match: Jewels vs. Valkyrie, Jewels special rules (pound allowed) -52 kg bout, 5:00 / 2 rounds

(Norway) Celine Haga (Team Hellboy Hansen, Jewels) vs. (Japan) Kyoko Takabayashi (Alive, Valkyrie)

Takabayashi defeated Haga by decision (3-0).

- 6th match: Jewels kickboxing rules -53.52 kg bout, 2:00 / 3 rounds

(Japan) Miku Hayashi (Bungeling Bay Spirit) vs. (Japan) Anna Saito (Fight Chix)

Hayashi defeated Saito by TKO (knees) at 1:22 of round 2.

- 7th match: Jewels special rules (pound allowed) -65 kg bout, 5:00 / 2 rounds

Hiroko Yamanaka (Master Japan) vs. (Mongolia) Esui (Smash Alley Gym)

Yamanaka defeated Esui by submission (armbar) at 2:20 of round 2.

- 8th match: Jewels special rules (pound allowed) -61 kg bout, 5:00 / 2 rounds

(Japan) Hitomi Akano (Abe Ani Combat Club) vs. (United States) Roxanne Modafferi (freelance)

Akano defeated Modafferi by decision (3-0).

- 9th match: Jewels official rules -52 kg bout, 5:00 / 2 rounds

(Japan) Megumi Fujii (Abe Ani Combat Club) vs. (Japan) Mika Nagano (Core)

Fujii defeated Nagano by decision (3-0).

- 10th match: Jewels vs. Valkyrie, Jewels special rules (pound allowed) -52 kg bout, 5:00 / 2 rounds

(South Korea) Seo Hee Ham (CMA Korea Team Mad/CMA KPW, Jewels) vs. (Japan) Mei Yamaguchi (freelance, Valkyrie)

Ham defeated Yamaguchi by decision (3-0).

- 11th match: Jewels vs. Valkyrie, Jewels special rules (pound allowed) -52 kg bout, 5:00 / 2 rounds

(Japan) Saori Ishioka (Zendokai Koganei, Jewels) vs (Japan) Yuka Tsuji (Angura, Valkyrie)

Tsuji defeated Ishioka by decision (3-0).
