= Valkyrie (mixed martial arts) =

MMA promoter based in Tokyo, Japan

- Company type: Private
- Industry: Mixed martial arts promotion
- Predecessor: Smackgirl
- Founded: September 2008
- Founder: Toyoki Kubo
- Defunct: 2011
- Fate: Dissolved
- Headquarters: Tokyo, Japan
- Area served: Tokyo, Japan
- Key people: Toyoki Kubo (GCM president); Yasuko Mogi (producer, matchmaker)
- Parent: GCM Communication Co. Ltd.
- Website: Official website at the Wayback Machine (archived 20 November 2011)

Valkyrie (ヴァルキリー, Varukirī), sometimes styled VALKYRIE in capitals, was a women's mixed martial arts (MMA) promotion. It was the sister of Japanese MMA promotion Cage Force, both operated by Greatest Common Multiple (GCM) Communication. Contrary to other Japanese women MMA promotions at the time, it featured a cage instead of a ring and used the same venues as Cage Force.

== History ==
Around 2004, GCM Communication, the parent company of Japanese promotion Cage Force, had already hosted some all-women MMA events named Cross Section and with the imminent dissolution of female MMA promotion Smackgirl, GCM Communication announced at the event Cage Force 08 on 27 September 2008 that the company would hold a new all-female promotion which would be named Valkyrie and would have its first event on 8 November 2008 in a double-header event with Cage Force. Takeshi Nagao, a former Smackgirl executive, and Yasuko Mogi were appointed as producers. Mogi announced several details of the promotion, such as the weight classes and the rules, which would be essentially the same as those used in Cage Force, and also that former Smackgirl Lightweight Champion Yuka Tsuji would participate in the promotion in a match against Mei Yamaguchi. Other matches would be announced at later dates. As part of its business strategy, Valkyrie events were held before Cage Force, in this way sharing venue, cage and other resources.

Valkyrie first event was held as planned on 8 November 2008, with a card featuring a victorious Tsuji, Yasuko Tamada, Tomomi Sunaba and Roxanne Modafferi against their rivals.

In its second event, Valkyrie 02, on 25 April 2009, Valkyrie crowned its first featherweight champion with Yuka Tsuji defeating American fighter Kate Martinez

The next Valkyrie event, title Cage Force & Valkyrie, was co-promoted with Cage Force and featured three female bouts. It took place on 12 July 2009. Mei Yamaguchi won the tournament to become the next challenger for the featherweight title.

Valkyrie 03 was held on 24 October 2009. Due to an injury, Yuka Tsuji would be unable to defend her title against Mei Yamaguchi, so it was decided to postpone that match for another event. Due to this, Yasuko Mogi stepped up to fight again against Misaki Takimoto in the main bout. Future Jewels featherweight champion Naho Sugiyama debuted professionally in this event.

On 11 February 2010 Valkyrie 04 was held. The event featured as the main bout Yuka Tsuji against Mei Yamaguchi for the featherweight title as well as the first round of the flyweight tournament to crown the first champion of the promotion. In a big upset in the history of women's MMA, Yamaguchi defeated Tsuji in the first round of their match, becoming the featherweight champion, and giving Tsuji her second professional defeat and the first since 2003.

For the next event, Valkyrie 05 held on 11 April 2010, Yasuko Tamada was originally slated to face Naoko Omuro for Valkyrie's flyweight championship, but Omuro suffered an injury and was forced to withdraw, being replaced by Yukiko Seki, who took the fight on short notice. and the championship bout was postponed until June 2010. A few days before the event, Ayame Miura got injured and was replaced by Megumi Yabushita. Yabushita and Kyoko Takabayashi, who defeated standout Emi Fujino, were the more notable winners of the event.

On 19 June 2010, Valkyrie 06 was held. During the event, future star Rin Nakai beat seasoned veteran Megumi Yabushita and in the flyweight tournament final Yasuko Tamada defeated Naoko Omuro to become Valkyrie's first champion in that weight.

Valkyrie 07, held on 26 September 2010, was an event with only three professional MMA bouts, two of which were part of the tournament to crown the first openweight champion of the promotion. Rin Nakai and Mizuho Sato advanced to the final of the tournament.

For the next event of the promotion, Valkyrie 08, Rin Nakai and Mizuho Sato were set to fight for Valkyrie openweight title and Mei Yamaguchi would fight against Kyoko Takabayashi to defend Valkyrie featherweight title. On 28 November 2010 the event took place, with Nakai becoming the openweight champion and Yamaguchi barely defending the featherweight title with a majority draw in a very controversial decision. Also notably, Naho Sugiyama defeated flyweight champion Yasuko Tamada in a non-title bout.

After several months with no news from the promotion, on 13 April 2011, in a notable development for female MMA promotions in Japan, Yasuko Mogi, matchmaker of Valkyrie, in an effort to keep Valkyrie alive, given that GCM Communication was apparently out of business with no other event planned, was present during the press conference of Jewels and announced along with Shigeru Saeki, Jewels matchmaker, that some of the MMA bouts of the 14 May 2011 Jewels event would have the theme Jewels vs Valkyrie, where fighters representing their respective promotions would face each other, starting with Misaki Takimoto vs. Naho Sugiyama and Miyoko Kusaka vs. Sachiko Yamamoto.

After the Jewels vs. Valkyrie theme in Jewels 13th Ring & 14th Ring, followed also in Jewels 15th Ring, and due to the lack of Valkyrie events, fighters from the Valkyrie promotion started joining rival Japanese promotion Jewels. Some of them had already participated in other MMA promotions already.

On 11 November 2011, members of Wajyutsu Keisyukai announced the formation of a new players association to separate themselves from GCM Communication and its president Toyoki Kubo due to the lack of activity of GCM Communication which had not held any new MMA event since 28 November 2010 and had not paid storage fees and other payments. A few weeks later, at Jewels 17th Ring on 17 December 2013 Yasuko Mogi became the matchmaker of Jewels and this effectively meant the end for the Valkyrie promotion.

== Rules ==
Generally speaking, the rules were based on Cage Force rules, which in turn were similar to the Unified Rules of Mixed Martial Arts, minus elbow strikes to the head and no ground-and-pound in amateur bouts. With respect to the length of matches, regular bouts were three three-minute rounds and title bouts were three five-minute rounds.

=== Weight classes ===
These were the official weight classes used by the promotion.

Weight class name	Upper limit
Flyweight	48 kg (105.8 lb; 7.6 st)
Bantamweight	52 kg (114.6 lb; 8.2 st)
Featherweight	58 kg (127.9 lb; 9.1 st)
Lightweight	64 kg (141.1 lb; 10.1 st)
Welterweight	70 kg (154.3 lb; 11.0 st)
Openweight	No weight restrictions

== Valkyrie events ==
Event name	Date	Venue	Location
Valkyrie 08	28 November 2010	Differ Ariake Arena	Ariake, Tokyo, Japan
Valkyrie 07	26 September 2010	Differ Ariake Arena	Ariake, Tokyo, Japan
Valkyrie 06	19 June 2010	Differ Ariake Arena	Ariake, Tokyo, Japan
Valkyrie 05	11 April 2010	Differ Ariake Arena	Ariake, Tokyo, Japan
Valkyrie 04	11 February 2010	Differ Ariake Arena	Ariake, Tokyo, Japan
Valkyrie 03	24 October 2009	Differ Ariake Arena	Ariake, Tokyo, Japan
Cage Force & Valkyrie	12 July 2009	Differ Ariake Arena	Ariake, Tokyo, Japan
Valkyrie 02	25 April 2009	Differ Ariake Arena	Ariake, Tokyo, Japan
Valkyrie 01 Cage Force-EX	8 November 2008	Differ Ariake Arena	Ariake, Tokyo, Japan

== Champions ==
Class	Champion	Period	Defenses
Openweight	(Japan) Rin Nakai	28 November 2010—2011	0
Featherweight	(Japan) Mei Yamaguchi	11 February 2010—2011	1
Featherweight	(Japan) Yuka Tsuji	25 April 2009—11 February 2010	0
Flyweight	(Japan) Yasuko Tamada	19 June 2010—2011	0

== See also ==
Cage Force
