= Jewels 16th Ring =

Mixed martial arts event in 2011

- The poster for Jewels 16th Ring
- Promotion: Jewels
- Date: September 11, 2011
- Venue: Shin-Kiba 1st Ring
- City: Koto, Tokyo, Japan
- Attendance: 426

Event chronology
Jewels 15th Ring	Jewels 16th Ring	Jewels 17th Ring

Jewels 16th Ring was a mixed martial arts (MMA) event held by Jewels at Shin-Kiba 1st Ring in Koto, Tokyo, Japan on September 11, 2011.

The event featured the first round of the Jewels Featherweight Queen tournament, which determined the first featherweight (-48 kg) titleholder of the promotion.

== Background ==
At the end of Jewels 15th Ring, it was announced that Jewels 16th Ring would hold the first round of the Jewels Featherweight Queen Grand Prix; a tournament that will crown the first featherweight queen (champion) of the promotion. Naho Sugiyama, Yasuko Tamada, Misaki Takimoto, Sachiko Yamamoto, Kikuyo Ishikawa, Yukiko Seki, Miyoko Kusaka and Ayumi Saito were revealed as the participants in the tournament.

On August 17, 2011, six bouts were announced for the card. Naho Sugiyama vs. Ayumi Saito, Yasuko Tamada vs. Kikuyo Ishikawa, Misaki Takimoto vs. Miyoko Kusaka and Yukiko Seki vs. Sachiko Yamamoto would be the quarterfinals in the Jewels Featherweight GP. Rina Tomita, competing for the first time since undergoing surgery six months earlier, would face Anna Saito in a regular MMA match, and Chikako WSR would face Satoko Ozawa in a kickboxing match.

Five days later on August 22, 2011, it was announced that 2010 Rough Stone GP -56 kg winner and kickboxing standout Mizuki Inoue would face Jewels Lightweight Queen Champion Ayaka Hamasaki in a non-title match. Two other matches, Emi Tomimatsu vs. Celine Haga and Yuko Oya vs. Akiko Naito were also added to the card. A kickboxing bout between Kozue Nagashima and South Korean Kim Sung Eun was added to the card on August 26, 2011.

Three more undercard amateur matches were announced a day before the event. Saya Ito vs. Ryouka and Mili Sasaki vs. Chihiro Imoto would compete as part of the Jewels Under-15 Kickboxing mini-tournament and Tamaki Usui vs. Nana Ichikawa would fight under amateur MMA rules.

The day before the event, all fighters made weight on their first attempt during the weigh-ins.

== Event ==
Saya Ito and Chihiro Imoto won their semi-final matches in the Jewels Under-15 amateur kickboxing tournament. They will face each other in the tournament final at Jewels 17th Ring on December 17, 2011.

Naho Sugiyama, Kikuyo Ishikawa, Misaki Takimoto and Yukiko Seki were victorious in quarterfinal matches in the Jewels Featherweight Queen tournament. A drawing was held after the event to determine semi-final matchups. Sugiyama faced Ishikawa, while Takimoto faced Seki. The semi-final and final will take place at Jewels 17th Ring.

In the main event, Ayaka Hamasaki defeated Mizuki Inoue via unanimous decision.

== Results ==
=== Opening card ===
- 1st opening fight: Jewels amateur rules -48 kg, 4:00 x 1 round

(Japan) Tamaki Usui (Reversal Gym Tokyo Standout) vs. (Japan) Nana Ichikawa (freelance)

Usui defeated Ichikawa by submission (armbar) at 2:01 of round 1.

- 2nd opening fight: Jewels U-15 Kickboxing Tournament semi-final, Jewels amateur kickboxing rules -46 kg, 2:00 x 2 rounds

(Japan) Chihiro Imoto (Kokushi Gym) vs. (Japan) Mili Sasaki (Shobukai)

Imoto defeated Sasaki by decision (3-0).

- 3rd opening fight: Jewels U-15 Kickboxing Tournament semi-final, Jewels amateur kickboxing rules -46 kg, 2:00 x 2 rounds

(Japan) Ryoka Yasuoka (T.B. Nation) vs. (Japan) Saya Ito (Shobukai)

Ito defeated Yasuoka by decision (3-0).

=== Main card ===
- 1st match: Jewels official rules -54 kg bout, 5:00 x 2 rounds

(Japan) Rina Tomita (AACC) vs. (Japan) Anna Saito (Fight Chix)

Tomita defeated Saito by technical submission (referee stoppage, armbar) at 4:24 of round 1.

- 2nd match: Jewels official rules lightweight bout, 5:00 x 2 rounds

(Japan) Akiko Naito (Deep Official Gym Impact) vs. (Japan) Yuko Oya (Wajutsu Keishukai RJW)

Oya defeated Naito by decision (2-1).

- 3rd match: Jewels official rules lightweight bout, 5:00 x 2 rounds

(Norway) Celine Haga (Team Hellboy Hansen, Jewels) vs. (Japan) Emi Tomimatsu (Paraestra Matsudo)

Tomimatsu defeated Haga by decision (3-0).

- 4th match: Jewels kickboxing rules -58 kg bout, 2:00 x 3 rounds

(Japan) Chikako WSR (WSR Fairtex) vs. (Japan) Satoko Ozawa (Team Dragon)

Ozawa defeated Chikako WSR by decision (2-0).

- 5th match: Jewels Featherweight Queen GP 2011 first round, Jewels official rules, 5:00 x 2 rounds

(Japan) Yukiko Seki (Fight Chix) vs. (Japan) Sachiko Yamamoto (Angura)

Seki defeated Yamamoto by decision (3-0).

- 6th match: Jewels Featherweight Queen GP 2011 first round, Jewels official rules, 5:00 x 2 rounds

(Japan) Misaki Takimoto (Zendokai Yokohama) vs. (Japan) Miyoko Kusaka (Grabaka Gym)

Takimoto defeated Kusaka by decision (3-0).

- 7th match: Jewels Featherweight Queen GP 2011 first round, Jewels official rules, 5:00 x 2 rounds

(Japan) Yasuko Tamada (AACC) vs. (Japan) Kikuyo Ishikawa (Reversal Gym Yokohama Groundslam)

Ishikawa defeated Tamada by decision (3-0).

- 8th match: Jewels Featherweight Queen GP 2011 first round, Jewels official rules, 5:00 x 2 rounds

(Japan) Naho Sugiyama (Wajutsu Keishukai Akza) vs. (Japan) Ayumi Saito (Angura)

Sugiyama defeated Saito by decision (3-0).

- 9th match: Jewels kickboxing rules -57.15 kg bout, 3:00 x 3 rounds

(Japan) Kozue Nagashima (y-park) vs. (South Korea) Kim Sung Eun (Kokusai Muay Thai Gym)

Nagashima defeated Kim by KO (knee to the body) at 0:34 of round 2.

- 10th match: Jewels official rules -54 kg bout, 5:00 x 2 rounds

(Japan) Ayaka Hamasaki (AACC) vs. (Japan) Mizuki Inoue (White Heart Karate Association)

Hamasaki defeated Inoue by decision (3-0).
