= Jewels 11th Ring =

Mixed martial arts event in 2010

- The poster for Jewels 11th Ring
- Promotion: Jewels
- Date: December 17, 2010
- Venue: Korakuen Hall
- City: Bunkyo, Tokyo, Japan
- Attendance: 1216

Event chronology
Jewels 10th Ring	Jewels 11th Ring	Jewels 12th Ring

Jewels 11th Ring was a mixed martial arts (MMA) event held by MMA promotion Jewels. The event took place on December 17, 2010 at Korakuen Hall in Bunkyo, Tokyo, Japan.

The event hosted the Jewels Lightweight Queen tournament semi-finals and along with the Rough Stone GP 2010 finals. It also held the retirement match for Miki Morifuji.

== Background ==
For the first time at the Korakuen Hall, Jewels first announced the semi-finals of the Jewels Lightweight Queen tournament and the finals of the Rough Stone GP 2010.

Two more fights were announced in November 2010, one of them was Miki Morifuji retirement match.

On December 3, 2010, along with two other matches, it was announced that Hiroko Yamanaka was slated to fight against 2008 Olympic bronze medallist American Randi Miller. After 5 days, December 8, 2010, a reserve match for the Lightweight Queen tournament was announced, with Saori Ishioka and Yuko Oya as participants, along with a grappling bout added to the card.

Replacing Randi Miller who withdrew from the event on December 12, 2010, it was announced that American Molly Helsel would take Miller's place and would fight against Hiroko Yamanaka, along with a second grappling match and a special exhibition match for the card. The final addition was a special demonstration which was added to the card on December 14, 2010.

The weigh-ins took place on December 16, 2010 and all fighters made weight without problems.

== Results ==
=== Opening card ===
- 1st opening fight: Jewels grappling rules -54 kg, 4:00 / 1R

(Japan) Emi Tomimatsu (Paraestra Matsudo) vs. (Japan) Akemi Ogawa (TK Esperanza)

Tomimatsu defeated Ogawa by decision (3-0).

- 2nd opening fight: Jewels grappling rules -54 kg, 4:00 / 1R

(Japan) Ricaco Yuasa (Pogona Club Gym) vs. (Japan) Mayumi Katouno (Iwaki K-3)

Yuasa defeated Katouno by decision (3-0).

=== Main card ===
- 1st match: Jewels official rules -55 kg bout, 5:00 / 2 R

(Japan) Emi Murata (54.1 kilograms (119 lb), AACC) vs. (Japan) Anna Saito (54.2 kilograms (119 lb), Fight Chix)

Murata defeated Saito by submission (triangle armbar) at 1:03 of round 1.

- 2nd match: Jewels official rules -50 kg bout, 5:00 / 2 R

(Japan) Miyoko Kusaka (49.5 kilograms (109 lb), Grabaka Gym) vs. (Japan) Asami Higa (49.8 kilograms (110 lb), S-Keep)

Kusaka defeated Higa by submission (scarf hold armlock) at 0:43 of round 2.

- 3rd match: Rough Stone GP 2010 –56 kg final, Jewels official rules, 5:00 / 2 R

(Japan) Asako Saioka (55.4 kilograms (122 lb), U-File Camp Gifu) vs. (Japan) Mizuki Inoue (55.4 kilograms (122 lb), White Heart Karate Association)

Inoue defeated Saioka by technical submission (referee stoppage, armbar) at 2:59 of round 1. Inoue became the Jewels -56kg Rough Stone Grand Prix 2010 champion.

- 4th match: Rough Stone GP 2010 –52 kg final, Jewels official rules, 5:00 / 2 R

(Japan) Hiroko Kitamura (51.8 kilograms (114 lb), Zendokai Koganei) vs. (Japan) Mai Ichii (51.8 kilograms (114 lb), Ice Ribbon)

Kitamura defeated Ichii by decision (3-0). Kitamura became the Jewels -52kg Rough Stone Grand Prix 2010 champion.

- 5th match: Rough Stone GP 2010 –48 kg final, Jewels official rules, 5:00 / 2 R

(Japan) Yukiko Seki (46.6 kilograms (103 lb), Fight Chix) vs. (Japan) Kikuyo Ishikawa (47.7 kilograms (105 lb), Reversal Gym Yokohama Ground Slam)

Ishikawa defeated Seki by decision (1-2). Ishikawa became the Jewels -52kg Rough Stone Grand Prix 2010 champion.

- Special demonstration

Japanese Kyokushin Karate champion Yoko Bito and pro-wrestler Fuka presented a martial arts demonstration.

- 6th match: Jewels Lightweight Queen tournament semi-finals block A, Jewels official rules, 5:00 / 2 R

(Japan) Ayaka Hamasaki (52.0 kilograms (114.6 lb), AACC) vs. (Japan) Sakura Nomura (52.0 kilograms (114.6 lb), Club Barbarian Impact)

Hamasaki defeated Nomura by decision (3-0). Hamasaki advanced to the tournament final.

- 7th match: Jewels Lightweight Queen tournament semi-finals block B, Jewels official rules, 5:00 / 2 R

(South Korea) Seo Hee Ham (51.9 kilograms (114 lb), CMA Korea Team Mad) vs. (Japan) Mika Nagano (52.0 kilograms (114.6 lb), Core)

Ham defeated Nagano by decision (2-1). Ham advanced to the tournament final.

- 8th match: Jewels Lightweight Queen tournament reserve match, Jewels official rules, 5:00 / 2 R

(Japan) Saori Ishioka (52.0 kilograms (114.6 lb), Zendokai Koganei) vs. (Japan) Yuko Oya (52.0 kilograms (114.6 lb), Deep Official Gym Impact)

Ishioka defeated Oya by submission (armbar) at 2:14 of round 1.

- 9th match: Miki Morifuji retirement match, special rules (pound allowed) -57 kg bout, 5:00 / 2 R

(Japan) Miki Morifuji (56.9 kilograms (125 lb), T-Blood) vs. (Japan) Kinuka Sasaki (56.9 kilograms (125 lb), Alive)

Morifuji defeated Sasaki by decision (3-0).

- Special exhibition match, no time limit bout

(Japan) Rina Takeda (playing the role of character Ayaka Kurenai (紅彩夏, kurenai ayaka)) vs. (Japan) Kazutoshi Yokoyama (playing the role of character Mutou Ryuuji (武藤竜士, ryūji mutō)

Promoting the Japanese film KG, actors were representing the roles of two characters from the movie.

- 10th match: Jewels official rules -59 kg bout, 5:00 / 2 R

(Japan) Shizuka Sugiyama (59.0 kilograms (130.1 lb), Zendokai Yokohama) vs. (Mongolia) Esui (58.5 kilograms (129 lb), Smash Alley Gym)

Esui defeated Sugiyama by TKO (corner stoppage, punches) at 0:13 of round 2.

- 11th match: Special rules (pound allowed) -65 kg bout, 5:00 / 2 R

Hiroko Yamanaka (64.7 kilograms (143 lb), Master Japan) vs. (United States) Molly Helsel (61.2 kilograms (135 lb), Victory MMA)

Yamanaka defeated Helsel by TKO (referee stoppage, 3 knockdowns, punches) at 3:11 of round 2.

- 12th match: Jewels Lightweight Queen tournament final, 5:00 / 2 R

(Japan) Ayaka Hamasaki (52.0 kilograms (114.6 lb), AACC) vs. (South Korea) Seo Hee Ham (51.9 kilograms (114 lb), CMA Korea Team Mad)

Hamasaki defeated Ham by decision (3-0). Hamasaki became Jewels Lightweight Queen Champion.

== Jewels Lightweight Queen tournament bracket ==
Quarter-finals
July 31, 2010
(Japan) Ayaka Hamasaki	SUB
(South Korea) Han Sol Lee	0:48, 1R
July 31, 2010
(Japan) Sakura Nomura	DEC
(Japan) Saori Ishioka	5:00, 2R
July 31, 2010
(Japan) Mika Nagano	SUB
(Norway) Celine Haga	2:52, 1R
July 31, 2010
(South Korea) Seo Hee Ham	DEC
(Japan) Mai Ichii	5:00, 2R

Semi-finals
December 17, 2010
(Japan) Ayaka Hamasaki	DEC
(Japan) Sakura Nomura	5:00, 2R
December 17, 2010
(South Korea) Seo Hee Ham	DEC
(Japan) Mika Nagano	5:00, 2R

Final
December 17, 2010
(Japan) Ayaka Hamasaki	DEC
(South Korea) Seo Hee Ham	5:00, 2R
