= Yasuko Mogi =

Japanese mixed martial artist (born 1969)

- Born: January 27, 1969 (age 57); Nerima, Tokyo, Japan
- Other names: Pink Spider
- Nationality: Japanese
- Height: 1.66 m (5 ft 5 1/2 in)
- Weight: 56 kg (123 lb)
- Division: Flyweight
- Style: Brazilian Jiu-Jitsu
- Fighting out of: Nerima, Tokyo, Japan
- Team: Freelance
- Years active: 2005-present

Mixed martial arts record
- Total: 12
- Wins: 3
- By submission: 2
- By decision: 1
- Losses: 9
- By knockout: 3
- By decision: 6

Other information
- Website: Official website
- Mixed martial arts record from Sherdog
- Last updated on: September 3, 2013

Yasuko Mogi (茂木 康子, mogi yasuko; born on January 27, 1969) is a Japanese female mixed martial arts (MMA) fighter. Her nicknames are Pioneer of women's Jiu-Jitsu world (女子柔術界のパイオニア, joshi jū jutsu kai no paionia) and Pink Spider (ピンクスパイダー, pinku supaidā).

Mogi has participated in MMA promotions Smackgirl, Shooto and Valkyrie. She formerly worked as Valkyrie's producer (matchmaker) and is now a producer for Jewels.

== Background ==
Mogi was born on January 27, 1969 in Nerima, Tokyo, Japan.

== Mixed martial arts career ==
Mogi made her professional debut in MMA on April 29, 2005 at Smackgirl-F 2005: I'll do it this year! Smack F Festival during The Next Cinderella Tournament 2005 portion of the event, submitting Gravure idol, actress, and tarento Ai Fukaya with an armbar.

On July 12, 2005, Mogi debuted with the Shooto promotion at G-Shooto Plus 02 and defeated Masako Yoshida by unanimous decision.

Returning to Smackgirl at the event Smackgirl 2005: Lightweight Anniversary, Mogi suffered her first defeat at the hands of kickboxing specialist Hisae Watanabe via TKO (punches) on November 29, 2005.

Mogi was defeated by Taeko Nagamine via split decision at Smackgirl 2006: Queen's Triumphant Return on April 22, 2006.

Mogi suffered her third straight loss on March 11, 2007 at Smackgirl: The Next Cinderella Tournament 2007 First Stage, where she was defeated by Akiko Naito via another split decision.

On June 26, 2008, Mogi defeated Ayumi Takeuchi by submission (rear naked choke) at Shooto 6/26 in Kitazawa Town Hall.

In a rematch from their 2005 bout, Mogi fought against Masako Yoshida at Shooto Spirit 2009, losing for the third time by split decision on May 24, 2009.

Debuting as a fighter in Valkyrie, Mogi was defeated by TKO (punches) by Misaki Takimoto at Valkyrie 03 on October 24, 2009.

On April 11, 2010 at Valkyrie 05, Mogi was defeated by Akiko Naito, this time by unanimous decision.

Mogi competed for the first time in more than two and a half years when she faced Keiko Tomita at Jewels 22nd Ring on December 15, 2012 in Tokyo. Mogi missed weight for the fight and was defeated by TKO early in the second round.

On March 30, 2013, Mogi faced Takumi Umehara at Jewels 23rd Ring. She was defeated by unanimous decision.

Mogi next faced Yuko Oya at Deep Jewels 1 on August 31, 2013. She was defeated by split decision.

== Submission grappling career ==
Mogi debuted in submission grappling in 1998 in a Brazilian Jiu-Jitsu tournament.

== Mixed martial arts record ==
Professional record breakdown
12 matches	3 wins	9 losses
By knockout	0	3
By submission	2	0
By decision	1	6

Res.	Record	Opponent	Method	Event	Date	Round	Time	Location	Notes
Loss	3-9	Yuko Oya	Decision (split)	Deep Jewels 1	August 31, 2013	2	5:00	Kabukicho, Tokyo, Japan	
Loss	3-8	Takumi Umehara	Decision (unanimous)	Jewels 23rd Ring	March 30, 2013	2	5:00	Kabukicho, Tokyo, Japan	
Loss	3-7	Keiko Tomita	TKO (punches)	Jewels 22nd Ring	December 15, 2012	2	0:20	Ariake, Tokyo, Japan	
Loss	3-6	Akiko Naito	Decision (unanimous)	Valkyrie 05	April 11, 2010	3	3:00	Ariake, Tokyo, Japan	
Loss	3-5	Misaki Takimoto	TKO (punches)	Valkyrie 03	October 24, 2009	3	0:51	Ariake, Tokyo, Japan	
Loss	3-4	Masako Yoshida	Decision (split)	Shooto: Spirit 2009	May 24, 2009	2	5:00	Sendai, Miyagi, Japan	
Win	3-3	Ayumi Takeuchi	Submission (rear-naked choke)	Shooto: 6/26 in Kitazawa Town Hall	June 26, 2008	1	2:45	Setagaya, Tokyo, Japan	
Loss	2-3	Akiko Naito	Decision (split)	Smackgirl: The Next Cinderella Tournament 2007 First Stage	March 11, 2007	2	5:00	Kabukicho, Tokyo, Japan	
Loss	2-2	Taeko Nagamine	Decision (split)	Smackgirl 2006: Queen's Triumphant Return	April 22, 2006	2	5:00	Taisho-ku, Osaka, Japan	
Loss	2-1	Hisae Watanabe	TKO (punches)	Smackgirl 2005: Lightweight Anniversary	November 29, 2005	1	4:03	Bunkyo, Tokyo, Japan	
Win	2-0	Masako Yoshida	Decision (unanimous)	G-Shooto: Plus02	July 12, 2005	2	5:00	Setagaya, Tokyo, Japan	
Win	1-0	Ai Fukaya	Submission (armbar)	Smackgirl-F 2005: I'll do it this year! Smack F Festival	April 29, 2005	1	3:50	Setagaya, Tokyo, Japan	The Next Cinderella Tournament 2005

== Submission grappling ==
Submission grappling record
13 Fights, 8 Wins, 5 Losses
Date	Result	Opponent	Event	Location	Method	Round	Time	Record	Notes
August 31, 2008	Loss	(Japan) Kyoko Abe	Gi Grappling 2008	Tokyo, Japan	Decision (points 0-0, advantages 0–1)	N/A	N/A	8-5-0	Gi Grappling 2008 Queen Tournament expert -52 kg semi-finals
September 24, 2007	Win	(Japan) Yuko Yamazaki	Smackgirl Grappling Queen Tournament 2007	Setagaya, Tokyo, Japan	Decision (points 4–3)	1	7:00	8-4-0	Lightweight third place bout
September 24, 2007	Loss	(Japan) Kyoko Takabayashi	Smackgirl Grappling Queen Tournament 2007	Setagaya, Tokyo, Japan	Submission (rear-naked choke)	1	1:30	7-4-0	Lightweight semi-finals
September 24, 2007	Win	(Japan) Saori Ishioka	Smackgirl Grappling Queen Tournament 2007	Setagaya, Tokyo, Japan	Decision (points 2–0)	1	7:00	7-3-0	Lightweight first round
April 15, 2007	Loss	(Japan) Sayaka Shioda	ADCC Japan Trial final qualifier	Tokyo, Japan	Submission (guillotine choke)	1	N/A	6-3-0	Women's -55 kg semi-finals
April 15, 2007	Win	(Japan) Mei Yamaguchi	ADCC Japan Trial final qualifier	Tokyo, Japan	Decision (points 6–2)	1	N/A	6-2-0	Women's -55 kg first round
February 11, 2005	Win	(Japan) Yuko Yamazaki	G-Shooto Plus 01	Tokyo, Japan	Submission (armbar)	2	1:25	5-2-0	Shooto grappling
May 16, 2004	Win	(Japan) Yasuko Tamada	Smackgirl F: 5-tsuki Byo o But Tobase! Natsu mo Chikai zo Sumakku F Sai	Tokyo, Japan	Decision (unanimous)	2	4:00	4-2-0	SGG 1 Day Tournament 2004 lightweight final
May 16, 2004	Win	(Japan) Yuki Sugiuchi	Smackgirl F: 5-tsuki Byo o But Tobase! Natsu mo Chikai zo Sumakku F Sai	Tokyo, Japan	Decision (unanimous)	2	4:00	3-2-0	SGG 1 Day Tournament 2004 lightweight semi-finals
May 16, 2004	Win	(Japan) Asami Kodera	Smackgirl F: 5-tsuki Byo o But Tobase! Natsu mo Chikai zo Sumakku F Sai	Tokyo, Japan	Submission (armbar)	2	1:49	2-2-0	SGG 1 Day Tournament 2004 lightweight first round
February 29, 2004	Loss	(Japan) Yasuko Tamada	All-Japan Shooto Grappling Championships	Tokyo, Japan	N/A	N/A	N/A	1-2-0	Women's strawweight final
July 6, 2003	Loss	(Japan) Rie Imazawa	Smackgirl Third Season-EX: Grappler's holiday	Tokyo, Japan	Decision (split)	3	3	1-1-0	SGG lightweight 1 day tournament final
July 6, 2003	Win	(Japan) Maiko Okado	Smackgirl Third Season-EX: Grappler's holiday	Tokyo, Japan	Decision (split)	3	3	1-0-0	SGG lightweight 1 day tournament first round
Legend: Win Loss Draw/No contest

== Championships and accomplishments ==
- 13th all-Japan amateur Shooto championship women's flyweight winner (2006)
- 14th all-Japan amateur Shooto championship women's flyweight winner (2007)
- 15th all-Japan amateur Shooto championship women's flyweight winner (2008)

== See also ==
- List of female mixed martial artists
