= Mizuki Inoue =

Japanese mixed martial arts fighter

- Born: August 19, 1994 (age 32); Toyohashi, Aichi Prefecture, Japan
- Height: 5 ft 4 in (163 cm)
- Weight: 115 lb (52 kg; 8 st 3 lb)
- Division: Lightweight (Jewels); Strawweight (Invicta FC)
- Team: Serra-Longo Fight Team (2018–present)
- Trainer: Ray Longo
- Rank: 1st degree black belt in Karate
- Years active: 2010–present

Kickboxing record
- Total: 13
- Wins: 11
- By knockout: 1
- Losses: 2

Mixed martial arts record
- Total: 22
- Wins: 16
- By submission: 9
- By decision: 7
- Losses: 6
- By decision: 5
- By disqualification: 1

Other information
- Notable relatives: Naoki Inoue
- Website: Official blog
- Mixed martial arts record from Sherdog
- Last updated on: August 30, 2015

Mizuki Inoue (井上 瑞樹, inoue mizuki; born on August 19, 1994), known mononymously as Mizuki (魅津希), is a Japanese female kickboxer and mixed martial artist. Inoue has fought in the kickboxing promotion J-Girls and MMA promotion Jewels. She won the 2010 Jewels -56 kg Rough Stone Grand Prix tournament at 16 years of age, becoming one of the youngest female champions in a major MMA promotion. As of October 24, 2026, she is #12 in the Meta UFC women's strawweight rankings.

On August 25, 2012, Inoue became the 2012 Shoot Boxing Girls S-Cup 53.5-kilogram tournament champion. She repeated this feat on August 3, 2013.

== Background ==
Inoue was born on August 19, 1994 in Aichi Prefecture, Japan. She started training karate in fourth grade when she accompanied her brother to his karate lesson. A year later, Inoue joined Hakushinkai Karate and also began training mixed martial arts (MMA). At 11 years old, Inoue met her karate and current main coach, Sadanori Yamaguchi, who is also the head of Hakushinkai Karate in Toyohashi, Aichi. He was the one who encouraged her to start MMA as he himself became interested in MMA after watching fellow karateka Minoki Ichihara, a Daido Juku champion, fall to Royce Gracie during UFC 2. At 15 years old, Inoue debuted professionally in shoot boxing prior to MMA due to believing that she had to be 18 years old to compete in MMA.

== Kickboxing and shoot boxing career ==
After several amateur bouts in kickboxing, Inoue made her debut in professional combat sports in shoot boxing on May 16, 2010 at Shoot Boxing Osaka 2010 Alpinisme: "Young Caesar vol. 2". She faced Kanako Oka and was defeated by majority decision.

Inoue next competed at the kickboxing event J-Girls Catch The Stone 9 on July 25, 2010, where Inoue, in an upset, defeated Emi Fujino via unanimous decision after three rounds. At this event, Inoue began using the ring name Mizuki instead of her real name, which she used in her previous amateur kickboxing bouts.

Despite having professional matches already, at the event Krush.9 on August 14, 2010, Inoue, for the last time, had an amateur rules match against Kanako Taniyama, losing against Taniyama via majority decision after two rounds.

Returning to professional competition, on September 20, 2010 at J-Girls Catch The Stone 10, Inoue defeated Anna Saito by unanimous decision after three rounds.

Inoue faced Nozomi Satake in the opening round of the 2011 J-Girls bantamweight tournament at J-Girls Catch The Stone 12 on January 30, 2011. She defeated Satake by majority decision.

Inoue faced Madoka Jinnai in the J-Girls bantamweight tournament semi-final round at J-Girls Catch The Stone 13 on March 6, 2011. She defeated Jinnai by unanimous decision after one extension round.

Inoue faced Natsuka in a shoot boxing match at Jewels 14th Ring on May 14, 2011. She defeated Natsuka by unanimous decision.

Inoue suffered her first professional loss in a kickboxing rules match at J-Girls 2011: Born This Way 2nd on July 10, 2011 when she was defeated by Yukino Oishi via majority decision in the J-Girls bantamweight tournament final.

At Shoot Boxing 2012: Road To S-Cup, Act.1 on February 5, 2012, Inoue faced Shoot Boxing Japan women's flyweight champion Ai Takahashi. In an upset, Inoue defeated Takahashi by unanimous decision after one extension round.

Inoue faced Mina at Shoot Boxing 2012: Road To S-Cup, Act.2 on April 13, 2012. She won the fight by referee stoppage in the third round to advance to the Shoot Boxing Girls S-Cup 53.5 tournament final.

Inoue faced Ai Takahashi once again in the 2012 Shoot Boxing Girls S-Cup 53.5 tournament final on August 25, 2012. She defeated Takahashi by unanimous decision after six rounds to become the first Shoot Boxing Girls S-Cup 53.5 champion.

On August 3, 2013, Inoue entered the 2013 Shoot Boxing Girls S-Cup 53.5 tournament. She defeated Izumi Noguchi, Miyo Yoshida and Ai Takahashi in one night to become the 2013 Shoot Boxing Girls S-Cup 53.5 champion.

== Grappling matches ==
On September 22, 2012, Inoue faced Yukiko Suzuki in a grappling match at Jewels 21st Ring. She defeated Suzuki by technical submission due to an armbar in just 56 seconds.

Inoue faced Rikako Yuasa in a grappling match at Deep Jewels 1 on August 31, 2013. She was defeated by unanimous decision.

== Mixed martial arts career ==
=== Jewels ===
At just 16 years old, Inoue debuted in MMA at Jewels 10th Ring on October 10, 2010 during the 2010 Rough Stone Grand Prix -56 kg tournament, submitting the more mature Abe Ani Combat Club member Emi Murata with an armbar in the second round.

On December 17, 2010 at Jewels 11th Ring, Inoue defeated the more experienced Asako Saioka via technical submission (referee stoppage, armbar) to win the 2010 Rough Stone GP -56 kg tournament.

Inoue faced Jewels champion Ayaka Hamasaki in a non-title bout at Jewels 16th Ring on September 11, 2011 in Tokyo. She was defeated by unanimous decision.

Inoue returned to Jewels to face Australian fighter Alex Chambers at Jewels 18th Ring on March 3, 2012. She defeated Chambers by submission due to an armbar in the first round.

On December 15, 2012, Inoue faced Hyo Kyung Song at Jewels 22nd Ring. She defeated Song by submission due to an armbar in the second round.

Inoue was next scheduled to face Mi-Jeon Chan at Jewels 23rd Ring on March 30, 2013. However, Chan suffered an injury and Inoue instead faced Seo Ye Jung. She defeated Jung by submission due to a rear-naked choke in the first round.

Inoue made her North American debut against Bec Hyatt at Invicta FC 6: Coenen vs. Cyborg on July 13, 2013. Inoue won the fight via unanimous decision.

In a rematch at Deep Jewels 2 on November 4, 2013, Inoue faced Emi Fujino in the opening round of the Deep Jewels lightweight title tournament. She won the fight by unanimous decision.

On February 16, 2014, Inoue faced Emi Tomimatsu to determine the inaugural Deep Jewels lightweight champion. Mizuki Inoue finished the match at 3:57 of the 3rd round via armbar, but was disqualified for not being able to make weight. Emi Tomimatsu was crowned the new champion.

=== Invicta Fighting Championship ===
Inoue was scheduled to face Milana Dudieva on March 24, 2018, at Invicta FC 28: Morandin vs. Jandiroba, however Morandin pulled out of the fight with Jandiroba, allowing Mizuki to step up into the main event which was for the vacant Invicta FC strawweight championship which she lost via split decision.

Inoue was scheduled to face Heather Jo Clark on November 16, 2018, at Invicta FC 32: Spencer vs. Sorenson. It was reported that Clark pulled out from the event and she was replaced by Viviane Pereira. At the weigh-ins, Inoue weighed in at 116.4 pounds, 0.4 pound over the strawweight non-title fight limit of 116. She was fined 25 percent of her purse, which went to her opponents Pereira and the fight proceeded to a catchweight bout. Inoue won the fight via unanimous decision.

=== Ultimate Fighting Championship ===
Inoue faced Yanan Wu, replacing Luana Carolina, on August 31, 2019, at UFC on ESPN+ 15. At the weigh-ins, Wu weighed in at 128 lbs, two pounds over the non-title fight limit. Wu was fined 30% of her purse to Inoue and the bout proceeded at catchweight. Mizuki won the fight via split decision.

Inoue was scheduled to face Tecia Torres on March 28, 2020, at UFC on ESPN: Ngannou vs. Rozenstruik. Due to the COVID-19 pandemic, the event was eventually postponed.

Inoue faced Amanda Lemos August 22, 2020 at UFC on ESPN 15. She lost the fight via unanimous decision.

In November 2020, Inoue underwent surgery to repair an anterior cruciate ligament injury.

After three years off due to injury, Inoue faced Hannah Goldy on September 23, 2023, at UFC Fight Night 228. She won the fight via unanimous decision.

After a two-year layoff, Inoue faced Jaqueline Amorim on October 25, 2025 at UFC 321. She won the fight by unanimous decision.

== Championships and accomplishments ==
=== Mixed martial arts ===
- Invicta Fighting Championships
  - Fight of the Night (Two times) vs. Karolina Kowalkiewicz and Alexa Grasso
- DEEP Jewels
  - Strawweight Champion (One time; current)
  - 2010 Jewels Rough Stone Grand Prix 56 kg tournament winner
- MMAJunkie.com
  - 2015 February Fight of the Month vs. Alexa Grasso

=== Shoot boxing ===
- Girls S-Cup
  - 2012 Shoot Boxing Girls S-Cup 53.5 kg tournament winner
  - 2013 Shoot Boxing Girls S-Cup 53.5 kg tournament winner

== Mixed martial arts record ==
Professional record breakdown
22 matches	16 wins	6 losses
By submission	9	0
By decision	7	5
By disqualification	0	1

Res.	Record	Opponent	Method	Event	Date	Round	Time	Location	Notes
Win	16–6	Jaqueline Amorim	Decision (unanimous)	UFC 321	October 25, 2025	3	5:00	Abu Dhabi, United Arab Emirates	
Win	15–6	Hannah Goldy	Decision (unanimous)	UFC Fight Night: Fiziev vs. Gamrot	September 23, 2023	3	5:00	Las Vegas, Nevada, United States	
Loss	14–6	Amanda Lemos	Decision (unanimous)	UFC on ESPN: Munhoz vs. Edgar	August 22, 2020	3	5:00	Las Vegas, Nevada, United States	Return to Strawweight.
Win	14–5	Wu Yanan	Decision (split)	UFC Fight Night: Andrade vs. Zhang	August 31, 2019	3	5:00	Shenzhen, China	Flyweight bout; Wu missed weight (129 lb).
Win	13–5	Viviane Pereira	Decision (unanimous)	Invicta FC 32	November 16, 2018	3	5:00	Shawnee, Oklahoma, United States	
Loss	12–5	Virna Jandiroba	Decision (split)	Invicta FC 28	March 24, 2018	5	5:00	Salt Lake City, Utah, United States	For the vacant Invicta FC Strawweight Championship.
Win	12–4	Lynn Alvarez	Submission (armbar)	Invicta FC 18	July 29, 2016	2	3:00	Kansas City, Missouri, United States	
Win	11–4	Nori Date	Submission (armbar)	DEEP: Jewels 11	March 5, 2016	1	3:12	Tokyo, Japan	
Win	10–4	Lacey Schuckman	Submission (armbar)	Invicta FC 15	January 16, 2016	3	3:41	Costa Mesa, California, United States	Performance of the Night.
Win	9–4	Emi Fujino	Decision (unanimous)	DEEP: Jewels 9	August 29, 2015	3	5:00	Tokyo, Japan	Defended the DEEP Jewels Strawweight Championship
Loss	8–4	Alexa Grasso	Decision (unanimous)	Invicta FC 11	February 27, 2015	3	5:00	Los Angeles, California, United States	Fight of the Night.
Loss	8–3	Karolina Kowalkiewicz	Decision (split)	Invicta FC 9	November 1, 2014	3	5:00	Davenport, Iowa, United States	Fight of the Night.
Win	8–2	Emi Tomimatsu	Submission (armbar)	DEEP: Jewels 5	August 9, 2014	3	1:33	Tokyo, Japan	Won the DEEP Jewels Lightweight (115 lb) Championship.
Loss	7–2	Emi Tomimatsu	DQ (overturned)	DEEP: Jewels 3	February 16, 2014	3	3:57	Tokyo, Japan	Originally a submission (armbar) win for Inoue; overturned due to her missing weight.
Win	7–1	Emi Fujino	Decision (unanimous)	DEEP: Jewels 2	November 4, 2013	2	5:00	Tokyo, Japan	DEEP Jewels Lightweight GP Semifinal.
Win	6–1	Bec Rawlings	Decision (unanimous)	Invicta FC 6	July 13, 2013	3	5:00	Kansas City, Missouri, United States	
Win	5–1	Seo Ye Jung	Submission (rear-naked choke)	Jewels 23rd Ring	March 30, 2013	1	1:43	Tokyo, Japan	
Win	4–1	Hyo Kyung Song	Submission (armbar)	Jewels 22nd Ring	December 15, 2012	2	2:14	Tokyo, Japan	Strawweight debut.
Win	3–1	Alex Chambers	Submission (armbar)	Jewels 18th Ring	March 3, 2012	1	4:32	Tokyo, Japan	
Loss	2–1	Ayaka Hamasaki	Decision (unanimous)	Jewels 16th Ring	September 11, 2011	2	5:00	Tokyo, Japan	
Win	2–0	Asako Saioka	Technical submission (armbar)	Jewels 11th Ring	December 17, 2010	1	2:59	Tokyo, Japan	2010 Rough Stone GP -56 kg Final.
Win	1–0	Emi Murata	Submission (armbar)	Jewels 10th Ring	October 10, 2010	2	2:58	Tokyo, Japan	2010 Rough Stone GP -56 kg (125 lbs) Semifinal.

== Kickboxing and shoot boxing record ==
13 fights, 11 wins, 2 losses
Result	Record	Opponent	Method	Event	Date	Round	Time	Location	Notes
Win	11–2	Ai Takahashi	Decision (unanimous)	2013 Shoot Boxing Girls S-Cup	August 3, 2013	3	2:00	Tokyo, Japan	Shoot boxing rules. 2013 Girls S-Cup 53.5 tournament final. Became 2013 Shoot Boxing Girls S-Cup 53.5 champion.
Win	10–2	Miyo Yoshida	Decision (unanimous)	2013 Shoot Boxing Girls S-Cup	August 3, 2013	3	2:00	Tokyo, Japan	Shoot boxing rules. 2013 Girls S-Cup 53.5 tournament semi-final.
Win	9–2	Izumi Noguchi	Decision (unanimous)	2013 Shoot Boxing Girls S-Cup	August 3, 2013	3	2:00	Tokyo, Japan	Shoot boxing rules. 2013 Girls S-Cup 53.5 tournament quarterfinal.
Win	8–2	Ai Takahashi	Decision (unanimous)	2012 Shoot Boxing Girls S-Cup	August 25, 2012	5+1	3:00	Tokyo, Japan	Shoot boxing rules. 2012 Girls S-Cup 53.5 tournament final. Became 2012 Shoot Boxing Girls S-Cup 53.5 champion.
Win	7–2	Mina	TKO (referee stoppage)	Shoot Boxing 2012: Road To S-Cup, Act.2	April 13, 2012	3	1:01	Tokyo, Japan	Shoot boxing rules. 2012 Girls S-Cup 53.5 tournament semi-final.
Win	6–2	Ai Takahashi	Decision (unanimous)	Shoot Boxing 2012: Road To S-Cup, Act.1	February 5, 2012	3+1	3:00	Tokyo, Japan	Shoot boxing rules.
Loss	5–2	Yukino Oishi	Decision (majority)	J-Girls 2011: Born This Way 2nd	July 10, 2011	3	2:00	Tokyo, Japan	Kickboxing rules. J-Girls bantamweight tournament final.
Win	5–1	Natsuka	Decision (unanimous)	Jewels 14th Ring	May 14, 2011	3	2:00	Tokyo, Japan	Shoot boxing rules.
Win	4–1	Madoka Jinnai	Decision (unanimous)	J-Girls: Catch The Stone 13	March 6, 2011	3+1	2:00	Tokyo, Japan	Kickboxing rules. J-Girls bantamweight tournament semi-final.
Win	3–1	Nozomi Satake	Decision (majority)	J-Girls: Catch The Stone 12	January 30, 2011	3	2:00	Tokyo, Japan	Kickboxing rules. J-Girls bantamweight tournament quarterfinal.
Win	2–1	Anna Saito	Decision (unanimous)	J-Girls: Catch The Stone 10	September 20, 2010	3	2:00	Tokyo, Japan	Kickboxing rules.
Win	1–1	Emi Fujino	Decision (unanimous)	J-Girls: Catch The Stone 9	July 25, 2010	3	2:00	Tokyo, Japan	Kickboxing rules.
Loss	0–1	Kanako Oka	Decision (majority)	Shoot Boxing Osaka 2010 Alpinisme: "Young Caesar vol. 2"	May 16, 2010	3	2:00	Osaka, Japan	Shoot boxing rules.

Legend: Win Loss Draw/No contest

== See also ==
- List of female mixed martial artists
- List of female kickboxers
