= Esui =

Mongol mixed martial artist and professional wrestler

- Born: Erdenebilegiin Bolormaa; May 9, 1985 (age 41); Ulan Bator, Mongolia
- Nationality: Mongolian
- Height: 1.72 m (5 ft 7 1/2 in)
- Weight: 64 kg (141 lb)
- Style: Wrestling
- Fighting out of: Tokyo, Japan
- Team: S Ovation (2007–2010); Smash Alley Gym (2010–present)
- Trainer: Mariko Yoshida (S Ovation); Akira Shoji (Smash Alley Gym)
- Years active: 2010–present

Mixed martial arts record
- Total: 4
- Wins: 2
- By knockout: 2
- Losses: 2
- By submission: 2

Other information
- Mixed martial arts record from Sherdog
- Last updated on: September 4, 2011

Erdenebilegiin Bolormaa (born May 9, 1985), better known by her ring name Esui (エスイ) is a Mongolian female professional wrestler and mixed martial artist. She is considered as Mongolia's first female professional wrestler and also the first female mixed martial artist from Mongolia.

== Background ==
Erdenebileg was born on May 9, 1985 in Ulan Bator, Mongolia.

== Professional wrestling career ==
Erdenebileg was recruited by Japanese female pro-wrestler Mariko Yoshida in a trip to Mongolia that Yoshida made in January 2007. Erdenebileg made her professional wrestling debut on May 5, 2007 in a tag match with Ran Yu-Yu (Tomoko Miyaguchi) as her partner, defeating Tojuki Leon (Rena Takase) and Aya Yuki at the Korakuen Hall.

Working for S Ovation's pro-wrestling promotion Ibuki, after Ibuki's last show on February 11, 2010, Erdenebileg announced her retirement from professional wrestling.

== Mixed martial arts career ==
A few months after her pro-wrestling retirement, Erdenebileg joined the Smash pro-wrestling promotion and started training at the Smash Alley Gym – the MMA division of Smash – with the purpose of debuting in MMA.

As preparation for MMA, Erdenebileg had a grappling match against Sachiko Fujimori, whom Erdenebileg defeated with an ude hishigi hiza gatame submission on June 26, 2010 at Amateur Deep Nishi Chofu Arena Rally (アマチュアDEEP西調布アリーナ大会, amachua DEEP nishi chōfu arīna taikai).

Before starting with MMA, Erdenebileg was scheduled to make her professional shoot boxing debut against Jewels star Shizuka Sugiyama at Jewels 9th Ring on July 31, 2010, but Sugiyama was forced to withdraw from the event due to an injury and Erdenebileg's match was changed from a shoot boxing match to a MMA bout with former powerlifter Mayumi Aoki. In her MMA debut, Erdenebileg was submitted by Aoki with an armbar in the first round.

Erdenebileg was next slated to fight against Brazilian fighter Carina Damm at Fury 2 to be held on October 9, 2010 in Macau before the event was canceled amid embezzlement allegations.

After Sugiyama recovered from her injury, Erdenebileg and Sugiyama fought on December 17, 2010 at Jewels 11th Ring, with Erdenebileg outstriking the karate expert to knock her down twice in the first round. Sugiyama's corner threw in the towel shortly after the beginning of the second round when Erdenebileg once again hurt Sugiyama with punches, giving Erdenebileg her first professional win.

Erdenebileg was scheduled to face Danielle West at Jewels 12th Ring on March 11, 2011 in Tokyo, Japan, but the event was cancelled after the Tōhoku earthquake and tsunami earlier in the day.

She next faced Chisa Yonezawa at Jewels 13th Ring on May 14, 2011 and defeated Yonezawa by TKO (doctor stoppage) after the first round.

Erdenebileg faced Hiroko Yamanaka at Jewels 15th Ring on July 9, 2011. She was defeated by armbar submission in the second round.

== Outside sports ==
Erdenebileg debuted as a singer with the CD Khan no Matsuei: Mongolian Challenger (ハーンの末裔 ～モンゴリアンチャレンジャー～, hān no matsuei mongorian charenjā; translated as Descendant of the Khan: Mongolian Challenger) released in November 2009.

== Mixed martial arts record ==
Professional record breakdown
4 matches	2 wins	2 losses
By knockout	2	0
By submission	0	2
By decision	0	0

Res.	Record	Opponent	Method	Event	Date	Round	Time	Location	Notes
Loss	2–2	(Japan) Hiroko Yamanaka	Submission (armbar)	Jewels 15th Ring	July 9, 2011	2	2:20	Tokyo, Japan	
Win	2–1	(Japan) Chisa Yonezawa	TKO (doctor stoppage)	Jewels 13th Ring & 14th Ring	May 14, 2011	1	5:00	Tokyo, Japan	
Win	1–1	(Japan) Shizuka Sugiyama	TKO (corner stoppage)	Jewels 11th Ring	December 17, 2010	2	0:13	Tokyo, Japan	
Loss	0–1	(Japan) Mayumi Aoki	Technical submission (armbar)	Jewels 9th Ring	July 31, 2010	1	4:34	Tokyo, Japan	

== See also ==
- List of female mixed martial artists
