= Jewels 17th Ring =

Mixed martial arts event in 2011

- The poster for Jewels 17th Ring
- Promotion: Jewels
- Date: December 17, 2011
- Venue: Shinjuku Face
- City: Kabukicho, Tokyo, Japan
- Attendance: 822

Event chronology
Jewels 16th Ring	Jewels 17th Ring	Jewels 18th Ring

Jewels 17th Ring was a mixed martial arts (MMA) event held by promotion Jewels on December 17, 2011 at Shinjuku Face in Kabukicho, Tokyo, Japan.

The event featured the semi-finals and final of the Jewels Featherweight Queen tournament, which determined the first featherweight (-48 kg) titleholder of the promotion. It also featured a Jewels lightweight queen championship match and the final of the Jewels Under-15 Amateur Kickboxing Tournament.

== Background ==
At the conclusion of Jewels 16th Ring, the semi-final matchups were determined in the Jewels Featherweight Queen Grand Prix; a tournament that crowned the first featherweight queen champion of the promotion at Jewels 17th Ring. Naho Sugiyama would face Kikuyo Ishikawa in one semi-final and Misaki Takimoto would face Yukiko Seki in the other. The winners would then face each other for the championship later on the same card.

On October 28, 2011, three bouts were announced for the card. Jewels lightweight queen champion Ayaka Hamasaki would defend her title in a rematch with Seo Hee Ham. Mei Yamaguchi would face Mika Nagano and Yasuko Tamada would face Sachiko Yamamoto in a Jewels Featherweight Queen GP reserve bout.

Two more fights, Emi Fujino vs. Celine Haga and Emi Tomimatsu vs. Rina Tomita, were added to the card on November 22, 2011.

The Jewels Under-15 Amateur Kickboxing Tournament final between Saya Ito and Chihiro Imoto, along with a non-tournament kickboxing match between Miku Hayashi and Kanomu Shisso, was confirmed for the card on December 2, 2011.

Four more fights were announced on December 9, 2011. In professional MMA bouts, Shino VanHoose would face Asami Higa and Yuka Okumura would face Anna Saito. Miyako Mitsuhori would face Mai in a kickboxing match and Yukari Yamaguchi would face Nana Ichikawa in an amateur MMA fight.

The final fight on the card, an amateur kickboxing match between Mili Sasaki and Fuka Saito, was announced on December 14, 2011.

The day before the event, all fighters made weight on their first attempt during the weigh-ins.

== Event ==
Chihiro Imoto defeated Saya Ito by unanimous decision to win the Jewels Under-15 Amateur Kickboxing Tournament.

Misaki Takimoto defeated Yukiko Seki in the first Jewels Featherweight Queen GP semi-final and Naho Sugiyama defeated Kikuyo Ishikawa in the other. Sugiyama then defeated Takimoto by technical submission (armbar) in the tournament final to become the first Jewels featherweight queen champion.

In the main event, Ayaka Hamasaki defeated Seo Hee Ham by TKO (corner stoppage) after the first round when Ham was unable to continue due to a back injury.

== Results ==
=== Opening card ===
- 1st opening fight: Jewels amateur kickboxing rules -48 kg, 2:00 x 2 rounds

(Japan) Mili Sasaki (Shobukai) vs. (Japan) Fuka Saito (Shakariki Dojo)

Sasaki defeated Saito by majority decision (20-20, 20-19, 20-19).

- 2nd opening fight: Jewels amateur rules, 4:00 x 1 round

(Japan) Yukari Yamaguchi (White Heart Karate Association) vs. (Japan) Nana Ichikawa (Freelance)

Yamaguchi defeated Ichikawa by technical submission (armbar) at 1:20 of round 1.

- 3rd opening fight: Jewels Under-15 Kickboxing Tournament final (-46 kg), Jewels amateur kickboxing rules, 2:00 x 2 rounds

(Japan) Chihiro Imoto (Kokushi Gym) vs. (Japan) Saya Ito (Shobukai)

Imoto defeated Ito by majority decision (20-19, 20-19, 19-19).

=== Main card ===
- 1st match: Jewels official rules -54 kg bout, 5:00 x 2 rounds

Yuka Okumura (Soul Fighters Japan) vs. Anna Saito (Fight Chix)

Okumura defeated Saito by submission (heel hook) at 4:41 of round 1.

- 2nd match: Jewels official rules -48 kg bout, 5:00 x 2 rounds

(United States) Shino VanHoose (Paraestra Hachioji/Shobukai) vs. (Japan) Asami Higa (S-KEEP)

VanHoose defeated Higa by unanimous decision.

- 3rd match: Jewels Featherweight Queen GP 2011 semi-final A (-48 kg), Jewels official rules, 5:00 x 2 rounds

(Japan) Misaki Takimoto (Zendokai Yokohama) vs. (Japan) Yukiko Seki (Fight Chix)

Takimoto defeated Seki by unanimous decision.

- 4th match: Jewels Featherweight Queen GP 2011 semi-final B (-48 kg), Jewels official rules, 5:00 x 2 rounds

(Japan) Naho Sugiyama (Wajutsu Keishukai AKZA) vs. (Japan) Kikuyo Ishikawa (Reversal Gym Yokohama Ground Slam)

Sugiyama defeated Ishikawa by split decision.

- 5th match: Jewels Featherweight Queen GP 2011 reserve bout (-48 kg), Jewels official rules, 5:00 x 2 rounds

(Japan) Sachiko Yamamoto (Angura) vs. (Japan) Yasuko Tamada (AACC)

Yamamoto defeated Tamada by split decision.

- 6th match: Jewels official rules -52 kg bout, 5:00 x 2 rounds

(Japan) Emi Tomimatsu (Paraestra Matsudo) vs. (Japan) Rina Tomita (AACC)

Tomimatsu defeated Tomita by split decision.

- 7th match: Jewels kickboxing rules -49 kg bout, 2:00 x 3 rounds

(Japan) Mai (Kenshinjyuku) vs. (Japan) Miyako Mitsuhori (Y'ZD Gym)

Mai defeated Mitsuhori by unanimous decision (30-28, 30-28, 30-29).

- 8th match: Jewels kickboxing rules -52 kg bout, 2:00 x 3 rounds

(Japan) Miku Hayashi (Bungeling Bay Spirit) vs. (Japan) Kanomu Shisso (Team SO)

Hayashi defeated Shisso by unanimous decision (30-28, 30-28, 30-28).

- 9th match: Jewels official rules -52 kg bout, 5:00 x 2 rounds

(Japan) Emi Fujino (Wajutsu Keishukai GODS) vs. (Norway) Celine Haga (Team Hellboy Hansen)

Fujino defeated Haga by unanimous decision.

- 10th match: Jewels official rules -52 kg bout, 5:00 x 2 rounds

(Japan) Mei Yamaguchi (Freelance) vs. (Japan) Mika Nagano (Core)

Yamaguchi defeated Nagano by split decision.

- 11th match: Jewels Featherweight Queen GP 2011 final (-48 kg), Jewels official rules, 5:00 x 2 rounds

(Japan) Naho Sugiyama (Wajutsu Keishukai AKZA) vs. (Japan) Misaki Takimoto (Zendokai Yokohama)

Sugiyama defeated Takimoto by technical submission (armbar) at 4:09 of round 1 to become Jewels featherweight queen champion.

- 12th match: Jewels Lightweight Queen Championship (-52 kg), Jewels special rules, 5:00 x 3 rounds

(Japan) Ayaka Hamasaki (AACC) vs. (South Korea) Seo Hee Ham (CMA Korea/Busan Team M.A.D.)

Hamasaki defeated Ham by TKO (corner stoppage) at 5:00 of round 1 to retain the Jewels lightweight queen championship.
