= Naho Sugiyama =

Japanese mixed martial artist

- Born: February 3, 1978 (age 48); Kyoto Prefecture, Japan
- Other names: Sugirock, Sugi Rock
- Nationality: Japanese
- Height: 1.54 m (5 ft 1/2 in)
- Weight: 48.0 kg (105.8 lb)
- Division: Atomweight (Invicta FC); Featherweight (Jewels)
- Stance: Orthodox
- Fighting out of: Tokyo, Japan
- Team: Wajutsu Keishukai Akza
- Years active: 2009-present

Mixed martial arts record
- Total: 17
- Wins: 12
- By knockout: 1
- By submission: 2
- By decision: 9
- Losses: 5
- By knockout: 1
- By submission: 1
- By decision: 3

Other information
- Website: ameblo.jp/sugi-69
- Mixed martial arts record from Sherdog
- Last updated on: November 11, 2013

Naho Sugiyama (杉山 直歩, Sugiyama Naho; born February 3, 1978), also known by her nickname Sugirock (スギロック, Sugirokku) or Sugi Rock, is a Japanese female mixed martial arts (MMA) fighter. She has competed professionally since 2009. In 2011, she became the first Jewels featherweight champion. Besides Jewels, Sugiyama has also competed in MMA promotions Valkyrie and Invicta Fighting Championships.

As of November 1, 2013, Sugiyama is ranked as the number four female atomweight (96-106 lb) fighter in the world according to the Unified Women's Mixed Martial Arts Rankings.

== Background ==
Sugiyama was born on February 3, 1978 in Kyoto Prefecture, Japan. A member of Wajutsu Keishukai Akza (和術慧舟會AKZA, wajutsu keishūkai akza), Sugiyama became interested in MMA after watching Caol Uno on TV at the K-1 World Max 2005 Japan Tournament on February 23, 2005, so she started training MMA as a hobby.

== Mixed martial arts career ==
After participating in four amateur bouts for the Smackgirl promotion, Sugiyama made her professional debut on October 24, 2009 in a bout where she defeated Madoka Ebihara by unanimous decision at Valkyrie 3. Sugiyama's second fight was on June 19, 2010 at Valkyrie 6, in which she defeated Megumi Morioka by TKO. In her last fight with Valkyrie, in an upset, Sugiyama defeated the then-flyweight champion Yasuko Tamada via unanimous decision in a non-title bout at Valkyrie 8.

Debuting in Jewels on May 14, 2011, Sugiyama submitted Misaki Takimoto with a rear naked choke in the first round at the combined event Jewels 13th Ring & 14th Ring, where Sugiyama represented Valkyrie as part of a Jewels vs Valkyrie theme.

In her fifth professional fight, Sugiyama faced and defeated Ayumi Saito by unanimous decision at Jewels 16th Ring on September 11, 2011 in a close bout that was part of the first round of the Jewels Featherweight Queen Grand Prix.

On December 17, 2011, at Jewels 17th Ring, Sugiyama was crowned as the first Jewels Featherweight Queen after winning the Jewels Featherweight Queen GP by defeating Kikuyo Ishikawa via split decision and Misaki Takimoto via technical submission (armbar).

Sugiyama faced Yasuko Tamada in a non-title rematch at Jewels 19th Ring on May 26, 2012. Despite being penalized for not making weight, Sugiyama was able to defeat Tamada once again by majority decision, keeping her unbeaten record intact.

Making her debut overseas, Sugiyama faced American fighter Jessica Penne at Invicta FC 3: Penne vs. Sugiyama on October 6, 2012 in a title bout to crown the first Invicta FC Atomweight Champion. Penne defeated Sugiyama by submission (triangle choke) in the second round.

On March 30, 2013, Sugiyama faced Celine Haga in a non-title bout at Jewels 23rd Ring. She was defeated by unanimous decision.

Sugiyama defended her Jewels title against Seo Hee Ham at Jewels 24th Ring on May 25, 2013. She was defeated by unanimous decision.

On November 4, 2013, Sugiyama faced Masako Yoshida at Deep Jewels 2. She won the fight by unanimous decision.

== Championships and accomplishments ==
=== Mixed martial arts ===
- Jewels
  - Featherweight Queen Grand Prix winner (2011)
  - Atomweight Championship (Two times; current)
- Fight Matrix
  - 2011 Female Fighter of the Year

== Mixed martial arts record ==
Professional record breakdown
17 matches	12 wins	5 losses
By knockout	1	1
By submission	2	1
By decision	9	3

Res.	Record	Opponent	Method	Event	Date	Round	Time	Location	Notes
Loss	12–5	Mina Kurobe	Decision (unanimous)	Deep Jewels 15	February 25, 2017	3	5:00	Tokyo, Japan	Lost the Deep Jewels Atomweight Championship.
Win	12–4	Emi Tomimatsu	Decision (unanimous)	Deep Jewels 12	June 5, 2016	3	5:00	Tokyo, Japan	Won the Deep Jewels Atomweight Championship.
Win	11–4	Mina Kurobe	Decision (unanimous)	Deep Jewels 10	November 23, 2015	3	5:00	Tokyo, Japan	
Loss	10–4	Ayaka Hamasaki	TKO (Punches)	Deep Jewels 5	August 9, 2014	1	4:01	Tokyo, Japan	
Win	10–3	Satomi Takano	Decision (split)	Deep Jewels 3	February 16, 2014	2	5:00	Tokyo, Japan	
Win	9–3	Masako Yoshida	Decision (unanimous)	Deep Jewels 2	November 4, 2013	2	5:00	Tokyo, Japan	
Loss	8–3	Seo Hee Ham	Decision (unanimous)	Jewels 24th Ring	May 25, 2013	3	5:00	Tokyo, Japan	Lost the Jewels Featherweight Championship.
Loss	8–2	Celine Haga	Decision (unanimous)	Jewels 23rd Ring	March 30, 2013	2	5:00	Tokyo, Japan	Non-title bout.
Loss	8–1	Jessica Penne	Submission (triangle choke)	Invicta FC 3: Penne vs. Sugiyama	October 6, 2012	2	2:20	Kansas City, Kansas, United States	For the inaugural Invicta FC Atomweight Championship.
Win	8–0	Yasuko Tamada	Decision (majority)	Jewels 19th Ring	May 26, 2012	2	5:00	Osaka, Japan	Sugiyama was penalized for not making weight. Non-title bout.
Win	7–0	Misaki Takimoto	Technical Submission (armbar)	Jewels 17th Ring	December 17, 2011	1	4:09	Tokyo, Japan	Jewels Featherweight Queen tournament final. Won the Jewels Featherweight Championship.
Win	6–0	Kikuyo Ishikawa	Decision (split)	Jewels 17th Ring	December 17, 2011	2	5:00	Tokyo, Japan	Jewels Featherweight Queen tournament semi-final.
Win	5–0	Ayumi Saito	Decision (unanimous)	Jewels 16th Ring	September 11, 2011	2	5:00	Tokyo, Japan	Jewels Featherweight Queen tournament quarterfinal.
Win	4–0	Misaki Takimoto	Submission (rear-naked choke)	Jewels 13th Ring & 14th Ring	May 14, 2011	1	4:06	Tokyo, Japan	
Win	3–0	Yasuko Tamada	Decision (unanimous)	Valkyrie 8	November 28, 2010	3	3:00	Tokyo, Japan	Non-title bout.
Win	2–0	Megumi Morioka	TKO (punches)	Valkyrie 6	June 19, 2010	2	2:20	Tokyo, Japan	
Win	1–0	Madoka Ebihara	Decision (unanimous)	Valkyrie 3	October 24, 2009	3	3:00	Tokyo, Japan	

== See also ==
- List of female mixed martial artists
