= Yasuko Tamada =

Japanese mixed martial arts (MMA) fighter

- Born: June 30, 1967 (age 59); Shinagawa, Tokyo, Japan
- Other names: Tama-chan; Ikuko
- Nationality: Japanese
- Height: 5 ft 0 in (1.52 m)
- Weight: 100 lb (45 kg)
- Division: Featherweight (45.4 kg – 48.0 kg) (Jewels)
- Fighting out of: Japan
- Team: Abe Ani Combat Club
- Trainer: Megumi Fujii
- Years active: 2005–present

Mixed martial arts record
- Total: 35
- Wins: 18
- By submission: 2
- By decision: 16
- Losses: 13
- By knockout: 1
- By submission: 1
- By decision: 11
- Draws: 4

Other information
- Website: Official blog
- Mixed martial arts record from Sherdog
- Last updated on: January 1, 2014

Yasuko Tamada (玉田 育子, tamada yasuko; born June 30, 1967) is a Japanese female mixed martial arts (MMA) fighter. She previously fought as a flyweight in the Valkyrie promotion and was the only Valkyrie Flyweight Champion. She later fought for Jewels and last competed for Deep.

Tamada was once ranked as the #6 female atomweight (96-106 lb) fighter in the world according to the Unified Women's Mixed Martial Arts Rankings.

== Grappling career ==
Tamada started fighting in the grappling tournament Girl Fight Challenge (GFC) on October 14, 2002. She managed to make it to the finals of a Smackgirl grappling tournament on May 16, 2004 where she lost to Yasuko Mogi. Tamada won a Smackgirl tournament on April 29, 2005 by defeating Naomi and was runner-up in 2006 and 2007. Her last grappling bout was at Gi Grappling 2008.

== Mixed martial arts career ==
Tamada made her professional debut in MMA with a split decision victory against Maho Muranami. Her next fights resulted in four losses and two draws. She rebounded with seven consecutive wins. After a draw in Valkyrie's first event, she won her next three fights. At Valkyrie 06, she became Valkyrie Flyweight Champion by defeating Naoko Omuro in her most impressive performance to date.

At Valkyrie 08 on November 28, 2010, in an upset, Tamada was defeated by Naho Sugiyama via unanimous decision in a non-title bout in which Sugiyama dominated Tamada during the three rounds.

Tamada faced Kikuyo Ishikawa in the opening round of the Jewels Featherweight Queen tournament at Jewels 16th Ring on September 11, 2011 in Tokyo. She was defeated by unanimous decision.

Tamada then faced Sachiko Yamamoto at Jewels 17th Ring on December 17, 2011. She was defeated by split decision.

On May 26, 2012, Tamada faced Naho Sugiyama in a non-title rematch at Jewels 19th Ring in Osaka, Japan. She was defeated by majority decision.

Tamada faced Naoko Omuro for a third time at Jewels 20th Ring on July 21, 2012. She defeated Omuro by technical submission due to an armbar in the second round.

Tamada next faced Satomi Takano at Jewels 22nd Ring on December 15, 2012. She defeated Takano by unanimous decision.

Tamada competed against Yukiko Seki for the third time at Deep Jewels 1 on August 31, 2013. She defeated Seki by unanimous decision.

Tamada made her US debut for Invicta Fighting Championships on September 6, 2014. She faced Michelle Waterson for the Invicta FC Atomweight Championship. Tamada lost the fight via TKO in the third round which was the first time she had ever lost via TKO.

== Mixed martial arts record ==
Professional record breakdown
35 matches	18 wins	13 losses
By knockout	0	1
By submission	2	1
By decision	16	11
Draws	4	

Res.	Record	Opponent	Method	Event	Date	Round	Time	Location	Notes
Draw	18–13–4	Hisae Watanabe	Draw (Majority)	Shooto Colors 1	May 21, 2023	2	5:00	Tokyo, Japan	
Win	18–13–3	Sakura Katada	Decision (unanimous)	Shooto - Gig Tokyo 33	October 15, 2022	2	5:00	Tokyo, Japan	
Loss	17–13–3	Reina Kobayashi	Decision (split)	DEEP Nagoya Impact: Kobudo Fight 28	July 24, 2022	2	5:00	Kasugai, Aichi Japan	
Loss	17–12–3	Aya Murakami	Submission (armbar)	DEEP Tokyo Impact 2021 ~2nd Round~	October 17, 2021	1	3:33	Tokyo, Japan	
Loss	17–11–3	Mizuki Furuse	Decision (unanimous)	Deep Jewels 28	February 24, 2020	2	5:00	Tokyo, Japan	
Win	17–10–3	Kotori Tamiya	Decision (unanimous)	Deep Jewels 26	October 22, 2019	2	5:00	Tokyo, Japan	
Win	16–10–3	Madoka Ishibashi	Decision (unanimous)	Deep Jewels 23	March 8, 2019	2	5:00	Tokyo, Japan	
Loss	15–10–3	Kanna Asakura	Decision (unanimous)	VTJ 7th	September 13, 2015	3	3:00	Urayasu, Chiba, Japan	
Loss	15–9–3	Michelle Waterson	TKO (knee & punches)	Invicta FC 8: Waterson vs. Tamada	September 6, 2014	3	4:58	Kansas City, Missouri, United States	For the Invicta FC Atomweight Championship.
Win	15–8–3	Yukiko Seki	Decision (unanimous)	Deep Jewels 1	August 31, 2013	2	5:00	Kabukicho, Tokyo, Japan	
Win	14–8–3	Satomi Takano	Decision (unanimous)	Jewels 22nd Ring	December 15, 2012	2	5:00	Koto, Tokyo, Japan	
Win	13–8–3	Naoko Omuro	Technical Submission (armbar)	Jewels 20th Ring	July 21, 2012	2	1:05	Koto, Tokyo, Japan	
Loss	12–8–3	Naho Sugiyama	Decision (majority)	Jewels 19th Ring	May 26, 2012	2	5:00	Taisho-ku, Osaka, Japan	Non-title bout. Sugiyama failed to make the weight.
Loss	12–7–3	Sachiko Yamamoto	Decision (split)	Jewels 17th Ring	December 17, 2011	2	5:00	Kabukicho, Tokyo, Japan	Jewels Featherweight Queen tournament reserve bout
Loss	12–6–3	Kikuyo Ishikawa	Decision (unanimous)	Jewels 16th Ring	September 11, 2011	2	5:00	Koto, Tokyo, Japan	Jewels Featherweight Queen tournament quarterfinal
Loss	12–5–3	Naho Sugiyama	Decision (unanimous)	Valkyrie 08	November 28, 2010	3	3:00	Koto, Tokyo, Japan	Non-title bout
Win	12–4–3	Naoko Omuro	Decision (unanimous)	Valkyrie 06	June 19, 2010	3	5:00	Koto, Tokyo, Japan	Won Valkyrie Flyweight Championship
Win	11–4–3	Yukiko Seki	Decision (unanimous)	Valkyrie 05	April 11, 2010	3	3:00	Koto, Tokyo, Japan	
Win	10–4–3	Fujuko Hamada	Decision (unanimous)	Valkyrie 04	February 11, 2010	3	3:00	Koto, Tokyo, Japan	
Win	9–4–3	Misaki Takimoto	Decision (unanimous)	Jewels 2nd Ring	February 4, 2009	2	5:00	Kabukicho, Tokyo, Japan	
Draw	8–4–3	Naoko Omuro	Draw (majority)	Valkyrie 01	November 8, 2008	3	3:00	Koto, Tokyo, Japan	
Win	8–4–2	Fukuko Hamada	Decision (unanimous)	Deep: 36 Impact	July 27, 2008	2	5:00	Osaka, Japan	
Win	7–4–2	Kayo Nagayasu	Decision (majority)	Shooto: 6/26 in Kitazawa Town Hall	June 26, 2008	2	5:00	Setagaya, Tokyo, Japan	
Win	6–4–2	Maho Muranami	Decision (unanimous)	Smackgirl: Starting Over	December 26, 2007	2	5:00	Bunkyo, Tokyo, Japan	
Win	5–4–2	Yuka Okumura	Submission (rear-naked choke)	Zst: Swat! Rx1	September 9, 2007	1	7:34	Tokyo, Japan	
Win	4–4–2	Masako Yoshida	Decision (unanimous)	Smackgirl: Summerfest 2007	July 26, 2007	2	5:00	Tokyo, Japan	
Win	3–4–2	Kayo Nagayasu	Decision (unanimous)	Shooto: Battle Mix Tokyo 2	March 30, 2007	2	5:00	Tokyo, Japan	
Win	2–4–2	Yukiko Seki	Decision (unanimous)	Smackgirl: Legend of Extreme Women	November 29, 2006	2	5:00	Bunkyo, Tokyo, Japan	
Loss	1–4–2	Ayumi Saito	Decision (unanimous)	Smackgirl: Women Hold Their Ground	September 15, 2006	2	5:00	Bunkyo, Tokyo, Japan	
Loss	1–3–2	Masako Yoshida	Decision (majority)	G-Shooto: G-Shooto 06	June 11, 2006	2	5:00	Setagaya, Tokyo, Japan	
Draw	1–2–2	Kayo Nagayasu	Draw	G-Shooto: G-Shooto 05	May 6, 2006	2	5:00	Kabukicho, Tokyo, Japan	
Draw	1–2–1	Eri Kaneya	Draw	G-Shooto: G-Shooto 04	March 11, 2006	2	5:00	Kabukicho, Tokyo, Japan	
Loss	1–2–0	Masako Yoshida	Decision (split)	Smackgirl: Shimokita Experiment League	October 15, 2005	2	5:00	Setagaya, Tokyo, Japan	
Loss	1–1–0	Yuki Furudate	Decision (split)	G-Shooto: Plus03	September 16, 2005	2	5:00	Setagaya, Tokyo, Japan	
Win	1–0–0	Maho Muranami	Decision (split)	G-Shooto: Plus02	July 12, 2005	2	5:00	Setagaya, Tokyo, Japan	

== Championships ==
- Valkyrie Flyweight Champion (2010)

== See also ==
- List of female mixed martial artists
