= Ayaka Hamasaki =

Japanese mixed martial artist

- Born: March 31, 1982 (age 44); Yamaguchi Prefecture, Japan
- Nationality: Japanese
- Height: 5 ft 2 in (1.57 m)
- Weight: 114 lb (52 kg)
- Division: Atomweight; Strawweight
- Style: Judo, Grappling
- Stance: Southpaw
- Fighting out of: Tokyo, Japan
- Team: Abe Ani Combat Club
- Trainer: Megumi Fujii
- Rank: 2nd Dan Black Belt in Judo
- Years active: 2009–present

Mixed martial arts record
- Total: 34
- Wins: 26
- By knockout: 3
- By submission: 11
- By decision: 12
- Losses: 8
- By knockout: 3
- By submission: 2
- By decision: 3

Other information
- Mixed martial arts record from Sherdog

Ayaka Hamasaki (浜崎 朱加, Hamasaki Ayaka; born March 31, 1982) is a Japanese female mixed martial artist, judoka and submission grappler. She is the former Rizin Super Atomweight Champion. She has fought in MMA promotions Shooto, Jewels and Rizin in Japan, and Invicta FC in the United States. Hamasaki won the first Jewels 115 lb (52 kg) Queen tournament to become the first lightweight champion of the promotion. Hamasaki vacated her title due to injuries on August 31, 2013. She is a former Invicta FC Atomweight Champion. Hamasaki is the first Asian to win a North American premier MMA promotion title.

Fight Matrix and MMARising.com list her as the number 2 atomweight fighter in the world, and one of the top 10 pound for pound female fighters in the world.

== Personal life ==
Hamasaki was born on March 31, 1982 in Yamaguchi Prefecture, Japan.

Outside of fighting, Hamasaki enjoys time with her dogs and going for walks.

== Martial arts training ==
Hamasaki practiced judo for 8 years, achieving 2nd dan. She stopped practicing judo after finishing college and was working in an office. A year and a half later, Hamasaki began training in MMA around 2008, partly for dieting purposes. She was introduced to the Abe Ani Combat Club (AACC) by her friend and AACC member Rina Tomita, and although Hamasaki knew about MMA, she was unaware of women's MMA.

== Mixed martial arts career ==
Hamasaki made her MMA debut on October 25, 2009 at Shooto Gig Central Vol. 19, defeating Kinuka Sasaki via submission (armbar) in the second round.

=== Deep Jewels ===
Joining Jewels for the first Lightweight Queen tournament, Hamasaki submitted South Korean kickboxer Han Sol Lee with an Americana in just 48 seconds in the opening round of the tournament at Jewels 9th Ring on July 31, 2010.

At Jewels 11th Ring on December 17, 2010, Hamasaki defeated Sakura Nomura after three competitive rounds via unanimous decision in the Lightweight Queen tournament semi-finals. In the same event, Hamasaki defeated South Korean Seo Hee Ham by unanimous decision, surprising commentators by holding her own in the striking exchanges against the experienced Korean kickboxer. Hamasaki won the tournament in the process and became the first Jewels Lightweight (115 lbs) Queen Champion.

Hamasaki was scheduled to face Lisa Ellis in a non-title bout at Jewels 12th Ring on March 11, 2011 in Tokyo, Japan. However, Ellis suffered a calf injury and was forced to withdraw from the fight. Hamasaki was then set to face Jessica Aguilar at 12th Ring instead, but the event was cancelled after the Tōhoku earthquake and tsunami earlier in the day.

Hamasaki faced Mizuki Inoue in a non-title bout at Jewels 16th Ring on September 11, 2011 in Tokyo. She defeated Inoue by unanimous decision.

Hamasaki defended her Jewels title in a rematch against Seo Hee Ham at Jewels 17th Ring on December 17, 2011. She won the fight by TKO (corner stoppage) after the first round when Ham could not continue due to injury.

Hamasaki faced Yuka Tsuji in a Jewels title fight at Jewels 19th Ring on May 26, 2012 in Osaka, Japan. She won the fight by submission due to a kimura in the first round.

=== Invicta FC ===
Hamasaki was scheduled to face Jasminka Cive at Invicta FC 2: Baszler vs. McMann on July 28, 2012 in Kansas City, Kansas. However, Cive was unable to secure a visa to compete and Hamasaki faced Lacey Schuckman instead. She defeated Schuckman by submission due to an armbar late in the third round.

Hamasaki was expected to face Carla Esparza at Invicta FC 4 in January 2013. However, Hamasaki withdrew from the fight in order to defend her Jewels title. She faced Emi Fujino at Jewels 22nd Ring on December 15, 2012 and defeated Fujino by unanimous decision.

Hamasaki agreed to face Carla Esparza for the Invicta FC Strawweight Championship at Invicta FC 6: Coenen vs. Cyborg on July 13, 2013, but Esparza withdrew due to a knee injury. Hamasaki was then matched up against Cláudia Gadelha. She was defeated by TKO in the third round.

==== Invicta FC Atomweight Champion ====
After suffering her first professional defeat, Hamasaki bounced back with two victories in Deep Jewels before challenging Hérica Tibúrcio at Invicta FC 13: Cyborg vs. Van Duin for the Invicta FC Atomweight Championship. Hamasaki won the fight and championship via split decision.

Hamasaki made her first title defense against Amber Brown at Invicta FC 16: Hamasaki vs. Brown on March 11, 2016. She successfully defended the title via third-round submission.

Her second title defense took place against Jinh Yu Frey at Invicta FC 19: Maia vs. Modafferi on September 23, 2016. She won the fight and retained the title via second-round doctor stoppage.

She then faced Lívia Renata Souza in a strawweight bout at Invicta FC 22: Evinger vs. Kunitskaya II on March 25, 2017. She lost the fight via first-round knockout.

Later in 2017 Hamasaki vacated her Invicta FC Atomweight title and subsequently signed with Rizin Fighting Federation.

=== Rizin FF ===
==== First Super Atomweight title reign ====
Ayaka faced Kanna Asakura on December 21, 2018 at Rizin 14 for the Rizin Super Atomweight Championship. She won the bout and the championship in the second rout via armbar.

Ayaka defended her title for the first time against Invicta FC Atomweight Champion Jinh Yu Frey at Rizin 16: Kobe on June 2, 2019. Ayaka won the fight via unanimous decision.

Ayaka faced Suwanan Boonsorn in a non-title bout on August 18, 2019 at RIZIN 18. She won the bout easily via first round armbar.

Ayaka faced former Road FC Women's Atomweight Champion Seo Hee Ham at Rizin 20 on December 31, 2019. She lost the trilogy fight via split decision, losing the Rizin Women's Super Atomweight Champion in the process.

On August 9, 2020, she faced Tomo Maesawa at Rizin 22 and won via second round kimura.

==== Second Super Atomweight title reign ====
Hamasaki next faced three time freestyle wrestling World Champion Miyuu Yamamoto on December 31, 2020 for the vacant RIZIN Super Atomweight belt. Ahead of her fight against Miyuu Yamamoto at RIZIN 26, Hamasaki said the opportunity to fight someone as legendary in combat sports like Yamamoto was an honor. Hamasaki won the bout and reclaimed the championship via first-round submission.

Hamasaki made her first title defense in a rematch against Kanna Asakura at Rizin 27 on March 21, 2021. She won a close bout via split decision.

Hamasaki was scheduled to face Emi Fujino in a non-title bout on September 19, 2021 at Rizin 30. She won the fight by unanimous decision.

Hamasaki faced the reigning Jewels Strawweight champion Seika Izawa in a non-title bout at Rizin 33 - Saitama on December 31, 2021. She suffered her first loss in two years, as Izawa won the bout by a second-round technical knockout.

Hamasaki made her second Super Atomweight title defense against Seika Izawa at Rizin 35 on April 16, 2022. She lost the fight by unanimous decision.

==== Super Atomweight Grand Prix ====
On July 7, 2022, it was revealed that Hamasaki would be one of eight participants in the 2022 Rizin Super Atomweight Grand Prix. Hamasaki faced the inaugural WSOF Women's Strawweight champion Jessica Aguilar in the tournament quarterfinals which were held at Rizin 37 - Saitama on July 31, 2022. She won the fight by unanimous decision.

Hamasaki was booked to face Si Woo Park in the tournament semifinals at Rizin 38 on September 25, 2022. She lost the fight by unanimous decision.

Hamasaki is scheduled to face Claire Lopez at Rizin Landmark 8 on February 24, 2024.

== Submission grappling ==
Hamasaki participated in a submission grappling mini-tournament held at Jewels 10th Ring on October 10, 2010, where she won the tournament by defeating Emi Tomimatsu via armbar submission in the second round and Yuko Oya, also by armbar in the first round.

Hamasaki faced Saori Ishioka in a grappling match at Jewels 14th Ring on May 14, 2011. She won the match by split decision.

== Championships and accomplishments ==
- Rizin Fighting Federation
  - Rizin Super Atomweight Championship (Inaugural, 2 times)
    - Two successful title defenses (Overall)
      - One successful title defense (First reign)
      - One successful title defense (Second reign)
  - Most submissions in Rizin women's history (five)
- Invicta Fighting Championships
  - Invicta FC Atomweight Champion (One time; former)
    - Two successful title defenses
- Deep Jewels
  - Jewels Lightweight Queen tournament winner
  - Jewels Lightweight Queen Champion (one time; former)
    - Three successful title defenses
- Women's MMA Awards
  - 2014 Atomweight of the Year

== Mixed martial arts record ==
Professional record breakdown
34 matches	26 wins	8 losses
By knockout	3	3
By submission	11	2
By decision	12	3

Res.	Record	Opponent	Method	Event	Date	Round	Time	Location	Notes
Loss	26–8	Natalia Kuziutina	Submission (armbar)	Rizin Landmark 13	April 12, 2026	1	4:54	Fukuoka, Japan	
Win	26–7	Lee Ye-ji	Decision (unanimous)	Deep Jewels 51	November 23, 2025	3	5:00	Tokyo, Japan	
Loss	25–7	Moeri Suda	Submission (rear-naked choke)	Deep Jewels 48	March 23, 2025	1	2:28	Tokyo, Japan	
Win	25–6	Shim Yu-ri	Submission (kimura)	Rizin Landmark 10	November 17, 2024	2	1:15	Nagoya, Japan	
Loss	24–6	Park Si-woo	Decision (unanimous)	Rizin 38	September 25, 2022	3	5:00	Saitama, Japan	2022 Rizin Super Atomweight Grand Prix Semifinal.
Win	24–5	Jessica Aguilar	Decision (unanimous)	Rizin 37	July 31, 2022	3	5:00	Saitama, Japan	2022 Rizin Super Atomweight Grand Prix Quarterfinal.
Loss	23–5	Seika Izawa	Decision (unanimous)	Rizin 35	April 17, 2022	3	5:00	Chōfu, Japan	Lost the Rizin Super Atomweight Championship.
Loss	23–4	Seika Izawa	TKO (elbows and punches)	Rizin 33	December 31, 2021	2	2:50	Saitama, Japan	Non-title bout.
Win	23–3	Emi Fujino	Decision (unanimous)	Rizin 30	September 19, 2021	3	5:00	Saitama, Japan	Non-title bout.
Win	22–3	Kanna Asakura	Decision (split)	Rizin 27	March 21, 2021	3	5:00	Nagoya, Japan	Defended the Rizin Super Atomweight Championship.
Win	21–3	Miyuu Yamamoto	Submission (leg scissor choke)	Rizin 26	December 31, 2020	1	1:42	Saitama, Japan	Won the vacant Rizin Super Atomweight Championship.
Win	20–3	Tomo Maesawa	Submission (kimura)	Rizin 22	August 9, 2020	2	1:26	Yokohama, Japan	
Loss	19–3	Ham Seo-hee	Decision (split)	Rizin 20	December 31, 2019	3	5:00	Saitama, Japan	Lost the Rizin Super Atomweight Championship.
Win	19–2	Suwanan Boonsorn	Submission (armbar)	Rizin 18	August 18, 2019	1	3:20	Nagoya, Japan	Non-title bout.
Win	18–2	Jinh Yu Frey	Decision (unanimous)	Rizin 16	June 2, 2019	3	5:00	Kobe, Japan	Defended the Rizin Super Atomweight Championship.
Win	17–2	Kanna Asakura	Submission (armbar)	Rizin 14	December 31, 2018	2	4:34	Saitama, Japan	Won the inaugural Rizin Super Atomweight Championship.
Win	16–2	Mina Kurobe	Submission (kimura)	Rizin 13	September 30, 2018	1	4:45	Saitama, Japan	
Win	15–2	Alyssa Garcia	Decision (unanimous)	Rizin 10	May 6, 2018	3	5:00	Fukuoka, Japan	
Loss	14–2	Lívia Renata Souza	KO (punches)	Invicta FC 22	March 25, 2017	1	1:41	Kansas City, Missouri, United States	Strawweight bout.
Win	14–1	Jinh Yu Frey	TKO (doctor stoppage)	Invicta FC 19	September 23, 2016	2	4:38	Kansas City, Missouri, United States	Defended the Invicta FC Atomweight Championship.
Win	13–1	Amber Brown	Submission (armbar)	Invicta FC 16	March 11, 2016	3	2:52	Las Vegas, Nevada, United States	Defended the Invicta FC Atomweight Championship.
Win	12–1	Hérica Tibúrcio	Decision (split)	Invicta FC 13	July 9, 2015	5	5:00	Las Vegas, Nevada, United States	Won the Invicta FC Atomweight Championship.
Win	11–1	Mei Yamaguchi	Decision (unanimous)	DEEP Dream Impact 2014: Omisoka Special	December 31, 2014	2	5:00	Saitama, Japan	
Win	10–1	Naho Sugiyama	TKO (Punches)	Deep Jewels 5	August 9, 2014	1	4:01	Tokyo, Japan	Deep Jewels Featherweight (105 lbs) debut.
Loss	9–1	Cláudia Gadelha	TKO (punches)	Invicta FC 6	July 13, 2013	3	3:58	Kansas City, Missouri, United States	Invicta FC Strawweight title eliminator.
Win	9–0	Emi Fujino	Decision (unanimous)	Jewels 22nd Ring	December 15, 2012	3	5:00	Tokyo, Japan	Defended the Jewels Lightweight Championship (115 lbs).
Win	8–0	Lacey Schuckman	Submission (armbar)	Invicta FC 2	July 28, 2012	3	4:45	Kansas City, Kansas, United States	
Win	7–0	Yuka Tsuji	Submission (kimura)	Jewels 19th Ring	May 26, 2012	1	3:41	Osaka, Japan	Defended the Jewels Lightweight Championship (115 lbs).
Win	6–0	Ham Seo-hee	TKO (corner stoppage)	Jewels 17th Ring	December 17, 2011	1	5:00	Tokyo, Japan	Defended the Jewels Lightweight Championship (115 lbs).
Win	5–0	Mizuki Inoue	Decision (unanimous)	Jewels 16th Ring	September 11, 2011	2	5:00	Tokyo, Japan	Non-title bout.
Win	4–0	Ham Seo-hee	Decision (unanimous)	Jewels 11th Ring	December 17, 2010	2	5:00	Tokyo, Japan	Jewels Lightweight Tournament Final. Won the inaugural Jewels Lightweight Championship (115 lbs).
Win	3–0	Sakura Nomura	Decision (unanimous)	Jewels 11th Ring	December 17, 2010	2	5:00	Tokyo, Japan	Jewels Lightweight Tournament Semi-Final.
Win	2–0	Lee Han-sol	Submission (Americana)	Jewels 9th Ring	July 31, 2010	1	0:48	Tokyo, Japan	Jewels Lightweight Tournament Opening round.
Win	1–0	Kinuka Sasaki	Submission (armbar)	Shooto: Gig Central 19	October 25, 2009	2	2:00	Nagoya, Japan	

== See also ==
- List of current Rizin FF fighters
- List of current mixed martial arts champions
- List of female mixed martial artists

Awards and achievements
Preceded by Hérica Tibúrcio	4th Invicta FC Atomweight Champion; July 9, 2015 – July 15, 2017	Succeeded by Jinh Yu Frey
