= Kikuyo Ishikawa =

Japanese MMA fighter

- Born: May 2, 1984 (age 42); Gushikawa, Okinawa Prefecture, Japan
- Nationality: Japanese
- Height: 5 ft 3 in (1.60 m)
- Weight: 106 lb (48 kg)
- Division: Atomweight
- Fighting out of: Yokohama, Kanagawa Prefecture, Japan
- Team: Real Gym (2008); Freelance (2009-2010); Reversal Gym Yokohama Ground Slam (2010-present)
- Trainer: Mitsuhisa Sunabe (Real Gym)
- Years active: 2008-2013

Mixed martial arts record
- Total: 13
- Wins: 9
- By knockout: 1
- By submission: 3
- By decision: 5
- Losses: 4
- By submission: 1
- By decision: 3

Other information
- Website: Official blog
- Mixed martial arts record from Sherdog
- Last updated on: January 1, 2014

Kikuyo Ishikawa (石川 菊代, ishikawa kikuyo; born on May 2, 1984) is a retired Japanese mixed martial artist. She won the 2010 Jewels Rough Stone GP in the -48 kg category.

Ishikawa was the first female mixed martial artist from Okinawa. She announced her retirement from MMA on December 15, 2013.

== Background ==
Ishikawa was born on May 2, 1984 in Gushikawa, Okinawa Prefecture, Japan. Originally a Real Gym member and regular freelance training partner of Pancrase fighter and fellow Okinawan Mitsuhisa Sunabe, she later moved to Yokohama where she joined Reversal Gym Yokohama Ground Slam.

== Mixed martial arts career ==
On November 16, 2008 at Jewels 1st Ring, Ishikawa debuted with a victory over Sumie Yamada via submission (triangle choke) in 62 seconds.

Fighting as a freelancer at Jewels 5th Ring on September 13, 2009, Ishikawa defeated Asako Saioka with a rear naked choke submission in less than 90 seconds. Ishikawa was originally set to fight against Mami Odera as part of the 2009 Jewels -48 kg Rough Stone Grand Prix, but Odera was injured before the bout and Ishikawa was given direct entrance to the final and fought instead in a regular match at the event.

In the final of the 2009 Jewels -48 kg Rough Stone Grand Prix, Ishikawa was defeated by Asami Kodera via unanimous decision at Jewels 6th Ring on December 11, 2009.

In her second consecutive loss, Ishikawa lost against Miyoko Kusaka by split decision on March 19, 2010 at Jewels 7th Ring.

Training with Reversal Gym Yokohama Ground Slam, Ishikawa rebounded with a victory over Misaki Ozawa via submission (armbar) in the first round during the 2010 Jewels -48 kg Rough Stone Grand Prix semi-finals at Jewels 10th Ring on October 10, 2010.

On December 17, 2010 at Jewels 11th Ring, Ishikawa won the 2010 Jewels -48 kg Rough Stone Grand Prix by defeating Yukiko Seki in the tournament final via split decision.

Ishikawa faced Sachiko Yamamoto in a Jewels vs. Valkyrie match at Jewels 15th Ring on July 9, 2011. She defeated Yamamoto by unanimous decision.

Ishikawa faced Yasuko Tamada in the opening round of the Jewels Featherweight Queen tournament at Jewels 16th Ring on September 11, 2011 in Tokyo. She defeated Tamada by unanimous decision. Ishikawa then faced Naho Sugiyama in the semi-finals of the tournament at Jewels 17th Ring on December 17, 2011. She was defeated by split decision.

Ishikawa competed in Okinawa for the first time when she faced Shino VanHoose at Pancrase Progress Tour 6 on May 20, 2012. She won the fight by unanimous decision.

Ishikawa was scheduled to face Angelica Chavez at Invicta Fighting Championships 2 on July 28, 2012 in Kansas City, Kansas. On June 14, 2012, it was announced that Ishikawa would no longer be competing on the card.

On December 15, 2012, Ishikawa faced Tomo Maesawa at Jewels 22nd Ring. She defeated Maesawa by unanimous decision.

Ishikawa faced Miyoko Kusaka in a rematch at Pancrase: Sakaguchi Dojo vs. Pancrase on April 21, 2013 in Okinawa, Japan. She defeated Kusaka by TKO in the first round.

On July 28, 2013, Ishikawa returned to Pancrase to face American opponent Amber Brown at Pancrase 250. She was defeated by submission due to an armbar in the third round.

== Mixed martial arts record ==
Professional record breakdown
13 matches	9 wins	4 losses
By knockout	1	0
By submission	3	1
By decision	5	3

Res.	Record	Opponent	Method	Event	Date	Round	Time	Location	Notes
Loss	9–4–0	Amber Brown	Submission (armbar)	Pancrase 250: 2013 Neo-Blood Tournament Finals	July 28, 2013	3	3:27	Tokyo, Japan	
Win	9–3–0	Miyoko Kusaka	TKO (punch)	Pancrase: Sakaguchi Dojo vs. Pancrase	April 21, 2013	1	1:43	Okinawa, Okinawa, Japan	
Win	8–3–0	Tomo Maesawa	Decision (unanimous)	Jewels 22nd Ring	December 15, 2012	2	5:00	Tokyo, Japan	
Win	7–3–0	Shino VanHoose	Decision (unanimous)	Pancrase Progress Tour 6	May 20, 2012	2	5:00	Okinawa, Okinawa, Japan	
Loss	6–3–0	Naho Sugiyama	Decision (split)	Jewels 17th Ring	December 17, 2011	2	5:00	Tokyo, Japan	Jewels Featherweight Queen tournament semi-final
Win	6–2–0	Yasuko Tamada	Decision (unanimous)	Jewels 16th Ring	September 11, 2011	2	5:00	Tokyo, Japan	Jewels Featherweight Queen tournament quarterfinal
Win	5–2–0	Sachiko Yamamoto	Decision (unanimous)	Jewels 15th Ring	July 9, 2011	2	5:00	Tokyo, Japan	
Win	4–2–0	Yukiko Seki	Decision (split)	Jewels 11th Ring	December 17, 2010	2	5:00	Tokyo, Japan	2010 Jewels -48 kg Rough Stone GP final
Win	3–2–0	Misaki Ozawa	Submission (armbar)	Jewels 10th Ring	October 10, 2010	1	2:24	Tokyo, Japan	2010 Jewels -48 kg Rough Stone GP semi-finals
Loss	2–2–0	Miyoko Kusaka	Decision (split)	Jewels 7th Ring	March 19, 2010	2	5:00	Tokyo, Japan	
Loss	2–1–0	Asami Kodera	Decision (unanimous)	Jewels 6th Ring	December 11, 2009	2	5:00	Tokyo, Japan	2009 Jewels -48 kg Rough Stone GP final
Win	2–0–0	Asako Saioka	Submission (rear-naked choke)	Jewels 5th Ring	September 13, 2009	1	1:18	Tokyo, Japan	
Win	1–0–0	Sumie Yamada	Submission (triangle choke)	Jewels 1st Ring	November 16, 2008	1	1:02	Tokyo, Japan	

== Championships ==
- 2010 Jewels -48 kg Rough Stone Grand Prix Champion

== See also ==
- List of female mixed martial artists
