= Abe Ani Combat Club =

MMA training facility in California

- Est.: N/A
- Primary trainers: Hiroyuki Abe (head MMA); Josh Barnett (Catch wrestling); Antonio Carvalho (Jiu-jitsu coach); Megumi Fujii (Freestyle wrestling & Sambo coach)
- Current titleholders: Ayaka Hamasaki (Jewels lightweight queen)
- Past titleholders: Hitomi Akano (Smackgirl middleweight champion; 58 kg); Yasuko Tamada (Valkyrie flyweight champion; 45.4 kg – 48.5 kg)
- Prominent fighters: Hitomi Akano; Megumi Fujii; Yasuko Tamada
- Training facilities: Tokyo, Japan
- Website: AACC Sports

The Abe Ani Combat Club is a mixed martial arts gym and training camp located in Japan. The gym is renowned mostly for its female stable of fighters who were regular competitors in the Smackgirl promotion. On its roster are prominent MMA stars such as Megumi “Mega Megu” Fujii and Hitomi Akano. Owner and head coach Hiroyuki Abe teaches mixed martial arts and former UFC Heavyweight Champion Josh Barnett is a catch wrestling coach for the gym.

== Notable members ==
- Hiroyuki Abe
- Hitomi Akano
- Antonio Carvalho
- Megumi Fujii
- Shinichi Kojima
- Hitomi Sakamoto
- Yasuko Tamada
- Ayaka Hamasaki
- Koyomi Matsushima

== Strikeforce controversy ==
The club was involved in a controversy during the mixed martial arts event Strikeforce: Shamrock vs. Diaz, the inaugural fight card for San Jose-based fight promoter Strikeforce under their new Showtime broadcast deal on April 11, 2009. Hitomi Akano, former Smackgirl 125-pound fighter, was to meet Chute Boxe fighter Cristiane "Cyborg" Santos in the 145 pound weight division. During the initial weigh-ins Cyborg was unable to meet the cutoff, weighing in at 152 pounds. Cyborg reportedly weighed more according to some claims by AACC staff and trainers. Not wanting to risk her health and future against a significantly larger fighter, Akano initially refused to go through with the fight and the California State Athletic Commission wouldn't sanction the fight, giving the Brazilian until 8 pm to reach 149 pounds. After further negotiation and reported concessions from Strikeforce owner and president Scott Coker (which are rumored encompass an increased presence of fight team members on the promotion's cards), she finally agreed to the match at a catchweight of 150 pound, the lightest weight Santos ultimately made. Giving up close to 15 pounds to a vastly larger fighter, Akano lost the fight via TKO in the third round but gained the respect of Showtime commentators for taking the fight despite the disparity.

Team members, trainers, and administration rallied around Cyborg following the event. Fellow fighter, and one-time trainer, Megumi Fujii blasted Cyborg as well as the Chute Boxe Academy calling them "shameful" and accused Cyborg of cheating. The team's wrestling coach Josh Barnett relayed similar sentiments on his MySpace blog, and manager Shu Hirata also displayed his disgust of the situation in his Sherdog Radio interview with Jordan Breen. All three, however, praised Coker for his professionalism during the negotiations.

== See also ==
- List of professional MMA training camps
