= Tomo Maesawa =

Japanese mixed martial artist

- Born: December 10, 1987 (age 38); Hachinohe, Japan
- Native name: 前澤智
- Nationality: Japanese
- Height: 4 ft 11 in (1.50 m)
- Weight: 104.9 lb (48 kg; 7 st 7 lb)
- Division: Atomweight
- Style: Judo, Brazilian Jiu Jitsu
- Fighting out of: Hachioji, Tokyo, Japan
- Team: Reversal Gym Tachikawa Alpha -> Reversal Gym Tokyo Standout
- Trainer: Masanori Kanehara -> Masato Kataoka
- Rank: Black belt in Brazilian Jiu Jitsu
- Years active: 2012 – 2020

Mixed martial arts record
- Total: 25
- Wins: 14
- By knockout: 2
- By submission: 3
- By decision: 9
- Losses: 11
- By knockout: 3
- By submission: 3
- By decision: 5

Other information
- Mixed martial arts record from Sherdog

Tomo Maesawa (Japanese: 前澤智, born 10 December 1987) is a retired Japanese mixed martial artist. A professional competitor since 2012, Maesawa is the former DEEP JEWELS Atomweight champion, having retired with the title after defending it twice.

At the time of her retirement, she was ranked as the #10 atomweight in the world by Fight Matrix and #9 by Sherdog.

== Mixed martial arts career ==
=== Early career ===
Maesawa was scheduled to make her professional debut against Mika Nagano at Jewels - 21st Ring. Nagano won the fight by unanimous decision.

Maesawa was scheduled to face Kikuyo Ishikawa at Jewels - 22nd Ring. Ishikawa won the bout by unanimous decision.

Maesawa faced Mina Kurobe at Jewels - 23rd Ring, and lost by a first-round submission, extending her losing streak to three fights.

Maesawa was scheduled to fight Hyo Kyung Song at Gladiator 64 - Sapporo. She earned the first professional victory of her career by submitting Song in the first round.

Measawa earned her second professional win with a first-round knockout of Yasuko Mogi at DEEP 64.

=== DEEP JEWELS ===
Maesawa was scheduled to fight Brittany Decker at Deep Jewels 4. She won the fight by unanimous decision.

Maesawa was scheduled to face Cortney Casey at PXC 44: Calvo vs Kadestam. Casey won the fight by a first-round technical knockout.

Maesawa made her second DEEP JEWELS appearance against Yuko Oya Deep Jewels 6. She beat Oya by unanimous decision. She won her third fight with JEWELS as well, winning a unanimous decision against Yukiko Seki at Deep Jewels 7.

Maesawa traded wins and losses over her next five fights. She first lost to Satomi Takano at Deep Jewels 8 by unanimous decision, before notching a victory against Karei Date at Deep Jewels 12. This was followed by her second career loss to Mina Kurobe at Deep Jewels 13. At Deep Jewels 14, Maesawa submitted Emi Tomimatsu by a third-round rear naked choke. She lost to Satomi Takano at Deep Jewels 16 by a second-round technical knockout.

Maesawa was scheduled to fight Ye Ji Lee at Road FC 041. Maesawa won the fight by split decision.

Maesawa was scheduled to fight Yuko Suzuki at DEEP 80 Impact. She won the fight by unanimous decision.

Maesawa fought a trilogy bout with Satomi Takano at Deep Jewels 18. Takano won the fight by unanimous decision, increasing her overall score against Measawa to 3-0.

Maesawa was scheduled to fight Yuko Saito at Deep Jewels 19. She won the fight by unanimous decision.

Maesawa was set to face Jeong Eun Park at Deep Jewels 21. She beat Park by unanimous decision.

==== DEEP JEWELS Atomweight champion ====
Maesawa challenged the reigning DEEP JEWELS Atomweight champion Mina Kurobe at Deep Jewels 22. They had fought twice previously, with Kurobe winning both of their prior bouts. Maesawa won the fight by split decision, with two of the judges scoring the fight 29-28 and 30-27 in her favor, while the third judge scored it 29-28 for Kurobe.

Maesawa was scheduled to fight Kanna Asakura in a non-title bout at Deep Jewels 23. Asakura won the fight by unanimous decision, using her superior wrestling to dominate Maesawa.

Maesawa was scheduled to make her Rizin debut at Rizin 17, against Seo Hee Ham. Ham won the fight by a first-round technical knockout, stopping Maesawa through repeated knee strikes.

After losing two non-title bouts back-to-back, Maesawa was scheduled to make her first title defense against Emi Tomimatsu at Deep Jewels 26. Maesawa won the fight by unanimous decision, with scores of 30-27, 30-27 and 29-28.

Maesawa was scheduled to make her second appearance with Rizin at Rizin 22, when she was scheduled to fight Ayaka Hamasaki. Hamasaki won the fight by a second-round kimura submission.

Maesawa made her second title defense against Hikaru Aono at Deep Jewels 30. She submitted Aono with a front choke, 57 seconds into the third round. During her post-fight interview, Maesawa announced her retirement.

== Championships and accomplishments ==
- DEEP JEWELS
  - DEEP JEWELS Atomweight Championship
    - Two successful title defenses

== Mixed martial arts record ==
Professional record breakdown
25 matches	14 wins	11 losses
By knockout	2	3
By submission	3	3
By decision	9	5

Res.	Record	Opponent	Method	Event	Date	Round	Time	Location	Notes
Win	14–11	Hikaru Aono	Submission (front choke)	Deep Jewels 30	October 31, 2020	3	0:57	Tokyo, Japan	Defends the DEEP JEWELS Atomweight Championship.
Loss	13–11	Ayaka Hamasaki	Submission (kimura)	Rizin 22	August 9, 2020	2	1:26	Yokohama, Japan	Flyweight bout.
Win	13–10	Emi Tomimatsu	Decision (unanimous)	Deep Jewels 26	October 21, 2019	3	5:00	Tokyo, Japan	Defends the DEEP JEWELS Atomweight Championship. Return to Atomweight.
Loss	12–10	Seo Hee Ham	TKO (knees)	Rizin 17	July 28, 2019	1	3:13	Saitama, Japan	
Loss	12–9	Kanna Asakura	Decision (unanimous)	Deep Jewels 23	March 8, 2019	3	5:00	Tokyo, Japan	Super Atomweight (108 lb) debut.
Win	12–8	Mina Kurobe	Decision (split)	Deep Jewels 22	December 1, 2018	3	5:00	Tokyo, Japan	Wins the DEEP JEWELS Atomweight Championship
Win	11–8	Jeong Eun Park	Decision (unanimous)	Deep Jewels 21	September 16, 2018	3	5:00	Tokyo, Japan	
Win	10–8	Yuko Saito	Decision (unanimous)	Deep Jewels 19	March 10, 2018	2	5:00	Tokyo, Japan	
Loss	9–8	Satomi Takano	Decision (unanimous)	Deep Jewels 18	December 2, 2017	3	5:00	Tokyo, Japan	
Win	9–7	Yuko Suzuki	Decision (unanimous)	DEEP 80 Impact	October 21, 2017	2	5:00	Tokyo, Japan	
Win	8–7	Ye Ji Lee	Decision (split)	Road FC 041	August 12, 2017	2	5:00	Wonju, South Korea	
Loss	7–7	Satomi Takano	TKO (referee stoppage)	Deep Jewels 16	May 20, 2017	2	4:42	Tokyo, Japan	
Win	7–6	Emi Tomimatsu	Submission (rear naked choke)	Deep Jewels 14	November 2, 2016	3	1:24	Tokyo, Japan	
Loss	6–6	Mina Kurobe	Decision (unanimous)	Deep Jewels 13	August 27, 2016	3	5:00	Tokyo, Japan	
Win	6–5	Karei Date	TKO (punches)	Deep Jewels 12	June 4, 2016	1	2:30	Tokyo, Japan	Flyweight bout.
Loss	5–5	Satomi Takano	Decision (unanimous)	Deep Jewels 8	May 31, 2015	3	5:00	Tokyo, Japan	
Win	5–4	Yukiko Seki	Decision (unanimous)	Deep Jewels 7	February 20, 2015	3	5:00	Tokyo, Japan	Return to Atomweight.
Win	4–4	Yuko Oya	Decision (unanimous)	Deep Jewels 6	November 3, 2014	3	5:00	Tokyo, Japan	
Loss	3–4	Cortney Casey	TKO (corner stoppage)	PXC 44: Calvo vs Kadestam	June 27, 2014	1	0:39	Mangilao, Guam	
Win	3–3	Brittany Decker	Decision (unanimous)	Deep Jewels 4	May 17, 2014	3	5:00	Tokyo, Japan	Catchweight (112 lb) bout.
Win	2–3	Yasuko Mogi	KO (punch)	DEEP 64 Impact	December 22, 2013	1	2:19	Tokyo, Japan	Catchweight (117 lb) bout.
Win	1–3	Hyo Kyung Song	Submission (armbar)	Gladiator 64 - Sapporo	October 27, 2013	1	N/A	Sapporo, Japan	Return to Flyweight.
Loss	0–3	Mina Kurobe	Submission (rear-Naked Choke)	Jewels - 23rd Ring	March 30, 2013	1	1:49	Tokyo, Japan	
Loss	0–2	Kikuyo Ishikawa	Decision (unanimous)	Jewels - 22nd Ring	December 15, 2012	2	5:00	Tokyo, Japan	Atomweight debut.
Loss	0–1	Mika Nagano	Decision (unanimous)	Jewels - 21st Ring	September 22, 2012	2	3:37	Tokyo, Japan	Flyweight debut.

== See also ==
- List of female mixed martial artists
