= Herica Tiburcio =

Brazilian mixed martial arts (MMA) fighter

Hérica Tibúrcio
- Born: January 1, 1993 (age 33); Toledo, Minas Gerais, Brazil
- Height: 4 ft 11 in (1.50 m)
- Weight: 105 lb (48 kg; 7.5 st)
- Division: Atomweight (2014 - present), Strawweight (2011-2014)

Mixed martial arts record
- Total: 16
- Wins: 11
- By submission: 7
- By decision: 4
- Losses: 5
- By decision: 5

Other information
- Mixed martial arts record from Sherdog

Hérica Tibúrcio (born January 1, 1993) is a Brazilian mixed martial artist who competes in the Atomweight division and she is a former Invicta FC Atomweight Champion. Also, she is the youngest champion in the history of the organization at the age of 21 after winning the title in her very first fight in the promotion, outside of her native Brazil and at Atomweight.

Tibúrcio's first title defense took place at Invicta FC 13: Cyborg vs. Van Duin on July 10, 2015 against Ayaka Hamasaki. Tibúrcio lost the fight via split decision.

== Championships and accomplishments ==
Earlier in her career, Tibúrcio faced future UFC title contender Cláudia Gadelha, losing by unanimous decision at Max Sport 13.2 in May 2013.

=== Mixed martial arts ===
- Invicta Fighting Championships
  - Invicta FC Atomweight Champion (One time)
  - Youngest champion in Invicta FC history (21)
  - Performance of the Night (Two times) vs. Michelle Waterson and Simona Soukupova
  - Fight of the Night (One time) vs. Michelle Waterson
- Women's MMA Awards
  - 2014 Fight of the Year vs. Michelle Waterson on December 5
- FightBooth.com
  - 2014 Upset of the Year vs. Michelle Waterson on December 5

== Mixed martial arts record ==
Professional record breakdown
16 matches	11 wins	5 losses
By knockout	0	0
By submission	7	0
By decision	4	5

Res.	Record	Opponent	Method	Event	Date	Round	Time	Location	Notes
Loss	11–5	Jéssica Delboni	Decision (unanimous)	Invicta FC 42: Cummins vs. Zappitella	September 17, 2020	3	5:00	Kansas City, Kansas, United States	
Win	11–4	Tessa Simpson	Decision (split)	Invicta FC 23: Porto vs. Niedźwiedź	May 20, 2017	3	5:00	Kansas City, Missouri, United States	
Win	10–4	Simona Soukupova	Decision (unanimous)	Invicta FC 20: Evinger vs. Kunitskaya	November 18, 2016	3	5:00	Kansas City, Missouri, United States	Performance of the Night.
Loss	9–4	Jinh Yu Frey	Decision (unanimous)	Invicta FC 16: Hamasaki vs. Brown	March 11, 2016	3	5:00	Las Vegas, Nevada, United States	
Loss	9–3	Ayaka Hamasaki	Decision (split)	Invicta FC 13: Cyborg vs. Van Duin	July 9, 2015	5	5:00	Las Vegas, Nevada, United States	Lost the Invicta FC Atomweight Championship.
Win	9–2	Michelle Waterson	Submission (guillotine choke)	Invicta FC 10: Waterson vs. Tiburcio	December 5, 2014	3	1:04	Houston, Texas, United States	Atomweight debut. Won the Invicta FC Atomweight Championship. Performance of the Night. Fight of the Night.
Win	8–2	Aline Sattelmeyer	Decision (unanimous)	MMA Super Heroes 3	March 30, 2014	3	5:00	Sao Paulo, Brazil	
Win	7–2	Chayen Aline Gaspar	Submission (armbar)	Talent MMA Circuit 5: Campinas 2013	November 23, 2013	1	1:57	Sao Paulo, Brazil	
Win	6–2	Kinberly Tanaka Novaes	Submission (armbar)	MMA Super Heroes 1	July 13, 2013	3	3:54	Sao Paulo, Brazil	
Loss	5–2	Cláudia Gadelha	Decision (unanimous)	Max Sport 13.2	May 11, 2013	3	5:00	Sao Paulo, Brazil	
Loss	5–1	Camila Lima	Decision (split)	Supreme Fight Championship	December 1, 2012	3	5:00	Sao Paulo, Brazil	
Win	5–0	Cyrlania Onelina Souza	Submission (armbar)	Pink Fight 2	March 10, 2012	1	3:30	Rio de Janeiro, Brazil	
Win	4–0	Alessandra Silva	Decision (unanimous)	Pink Fight	January 29, 2012	3	5:00	Bahia, Brazil	
Win	3–0	Bruna Paiffer	Submission (guillotine choke)	Full Heroes Battle 4	June 25, 2011	1	3:10	Paranaguá, Brazil	
Win	2–0	Camila Lima	Submission (guillotine choke)	Centurion Fight Combat	June 18, 2011	1	2:30	Sao Paulo, Brazil	
Win	1–0	Daniela Souza	Submission (armbar)	FPMMA Combat	May 30, 2011	1	0:56	Sao Paulo, Brazil	

== See also ==
- List of female mixed martial artists

Awards and achievements
Preceded by Michelle Waterson	3rd Invicta FC Atomweight Champion; December 5, 2014 – July 9, 2015	Succeeded by Ayaka Hamasaki
