= Ayaka Watanabe =

Japanese mixed martial artist

- Born: June 14, 1997 (age 29); Toyokawa, Aichi, Japan
- Native name: 渡辺彩華
- Nationality: Japanese
- Height: 5 ft 2 in (1.57 m)
- Weight: 110 lb (50 kg; 7 st 12 lb)
- Division: Atomweight
- Fighting out of: Aichi, Japan
- Team: Paraestra Kashiwa
- Years active: 2020–present

Mixed martial arts record
- Total: 7
- Wins: 4
- By knockout: 3
- By submission: 1
- By decision: 0
- Losses: 3
- By knockout: 0
- By submission: 0
- By decision: 3

Other information
- Mixed martial arts record from Sherdog

Ayaka Watanabe (渡辺彩華, Watanabe Ayaka; born June 14, 1997) is a Japanese mixed martial artist, currently fighting in the super atomweight division of Shooto, where she is the current Shooto Super Atomweight champion in her first reign. A professional competitor since 2020, Watanabe has also competed in Jewels and Pancrase.

== Mixed martial arts career ==
=== Early career ===
In her professional mixed martial arts debut, Watanabe was scheduled to face Akari Jinno at Deep Jewels 31 on December 19, 2020. She won the bout by a first-round technical knockout.

Watanabe faced Emi Fujino at Pancrase 28th Neo-Blood Tournament Finals on October 9, 2022, having been brought in to replace Song Hye Yun. She lost the fight via unanimous decision.

=== Shooto ===
In her Shooto debut, Watanabe faced Mina Kurobe on January 15, 2023, at Shooto 2023 Opening Round. She won the bout by knockout in the second round.

Watanabe faced defending Shooto Super Atomweight champion Satomi Takano, at Shooto Colors 1 on May 21, 2023. She won the fight by a second-round technical knockout to win the title.

Watanabe faced Machi Fukuda at Rizin Landmark 6 on October 1, 2023, losing the fight by split decision.

Watanabe faced Park Bo-hyun at Shooto Colors Vol.3 on August 3, 2024. She lost the fight by unanimous decision.

== Championships and accomplishments ==
- Shooto
  - Shooto Super Atomweight Championship (One time, current)

== Mixed martial arts record ==
Professional record breakdown
7 matches	4 wins	3 losses
By knockout	3	0
By submission	1	0
By decision	0	3

Res.	Record	Opponent	Method	Event	Date	Round	Time	Location	Notes
Win	4–3	Chiyo Takamoto	Submission (rear-naked choke)	Shooto 2026 Vol.5	July 20, 2026	3	2:41	Tokyo, Japan	Defended the Shooto Super Atomweight Championship.
Loss	3–3	Park Bo-hyun	Decision (unanimous)	Shooto Colors Vol.3	August 3, 2024	3	5:00	Tokyo, Japan	
Loss	3–2	Machi Fukuda	Decision (split)	Rizin Landmark 6	October 1, 2023	3	5:00	Nagoya, Japan	Return to Strawweight.
Win	3–1	Satomi Takano	TKO (head kick and punches)	Shooto Colors Vol.1	May 21, 2023	2	2:36	Tokyo, Japan	Won the Shooto Super Atomweight Championship.
Win	2–1	Mina Kurobe	KO (punch)	Shooto 2023 Vol.1	January 15, 2023	2	2:29	Tokyo, Japan	Super Atomweight debut.
Loss	1–1	Emi Fujino	Decision (unanimous)	Pancrase – 28th Neo-Blood Tournament Finals	October 10, 2022	3	5:00	Tokyo, Japan	
Win	1–0	Akari Jinno	TKO (referee stoppage)	Deep Jewels 31	December 19, 2020	1	4:56	Tokyo, Japan	Strawweight debut.
