= Stephanie Frausto =

American mixed martial artist

- Born: September 20, 1990 (age 36); Madera, California, U.S.
- Other names: Macaquinha
- Height: 5 ft 2 in (157 cm)
- Weight: 115 lb (52 kg; 8.2 st)
- Division: Strawweight

Mixed martial arts record
- Total: 17
- Wins: 8
- By knockout: 4
- By submission: 3
- By decision: 1
- Losses: 9
- By knockout: 3
- By submission: 2
- By decision: 4

Other information
- Notable relatives: Zoila Frausto Gurgel sister
- Mixed martial arts record from Sherdog

Stephanie Frausto is an American mixed martial artist who competes in the Atomweight division. She has fought in Invicta FC and Bellator. She is the younger sister of former Bellator women's Strawweight Champion Zoila Frausto.

== Championships and accomplishments ==
- King of the Cage
  - KOTC Strawweight Championship (1 time)

== Mixed martial arts record ==
Professional record breakdown
17 matches	8 wins	9 losses
By knockout	4	3
By submission	3	2
By decision	1	4

Res.	Record	Opponent	Method	Event	Date	Round	Time	Location	Notes
Loss	8–9	Camila Rivarola	Decision (unanimous)	Combate: Bravo vs. Estrada	December 3, 2021	3	5:00	Medley, Florida, United States	
Loss	8–8	Yazmin Jauregui	Decision (unanimous)	Combate Global	August 13, 2021	3	5:00	Miami, Florida, United States	
Loss	8–7	Luana Pinheiro	TKO (punches)	Dana White's Contender Series 35	November 10, 2020	1	2:48	Las Vegas, Nevada, United States	
Win	8–6	Charisa Sigala	TKO (punches)	Combate Americas - Mexico vs. USA	February 28, 2020	2	4:06	Fresno, California, United States	
Win	7–6	Celine Haga	TKO (punches)	Combate Americas - Fresno	November 22, 2019	2	4:59	Fresno, California, United States	
Win	6–6	Angela Danzig	Decision (unanimous)	KOTC: Flashback	June 24, 2017	5	5:00	Oroville, California, United States	Won the vacant KOTC Women's Strawweight Championship.
Loss	5–6	Jamielene Nievara	TKO (punches)	Bellator 154	May 14, 2016	3	2:43	San Jose, California, United States	
Win	5–5	Maria Andaverde	Submission (armbar)	KOTC - Total Elimination	October 3, 2015	2	3:05	Oroville, California, United States	
Loss	4–5	Cassie Rodish	TKO (punches and elbows)	Invicta FC 4	January 5, 2013	3	1:04	Kansas City, Kansas, United States	
Win	4–4	Amy Davis	Submission (guillotine choke)	Invicta FC 3	October 6, 2012	1	0:48	Kansas City, Kansas, United States	
Win	3–4	Diana Rael	Submission (armbar)	WFC - Women's Fighting Championship 1	May 12, 2012	1	3:25	Casper, Wyoming, United States	
Loss	2–4	Ashley Cummins	Decision (unanimous)	NAAFS - Caged Fury 16	January 28, 2012	3	3:00	Morgantown, West Virginia, United States	
loss	2–3	Paulina Ramirez	Decision (split)	TPF 6: High Stakes	September 9, 2010	3	3:00	Lemoore, Californie, United States	
Loss	2–2	Lisa Ellis	Technical Submission (rear-naked choke)	Bellator 22	June 17, 2010	1	2:01	Kansas City, Missouri, United States	
Win	2–1	Elaine Garza	TKO (punches)	TWC 8 - Meltdown	May 16, 2010	1	2:18	Porterville, California, United States	
Loss	1–1	Trisha Pinon	Submission (armbar)	TWC 7 - Violence	March 7, 2010	1	2:18	Porterville, California, United States	
Win	1–0	Erica Madrid	TKO (punches)	TWC 6 - Primitive Rage	January 10, 2010	1	2:42	Porterville, California, United States	
