= Tessa Simpson =

American mixed martial arts (MMA) fighter

- Born: October 27, 1986 (age 39); Mangilao, Guam
- Other names: The Typhoon
- Nationality: American
- Height: 5 ft 3 in (160 cm)
- Division: Atomweight (105 lbs)
- Style: BJJ, Kickboxing
- Fighting out of: Austin, Texas, U.S.
- Team: Austin Kickboxing Academy
- Years active: 2009–2017

Mixed martial arts record
- Total: 8
- Wins: 5
- By knockout: 1
- By submission: 2
- By decision: 2
- Losses: 3
- By submission: 2
- By decision: 1

Other information
- Mixed martial arts record from Sherdog

Tessa Simpson (born October 27, 1986) is an American former mixed martial artist who competed in Atomweight division of the Invicta Fighting Championships (Invicta).

== Background ==
Simpson was born in Guam. Growing up as a teenager, she was actively competing in various sports. She started training in jiu-jitsu after watching Pride Fighting Championships and Pancrase events. She took up Muay Thai later and transitioned to mixed martial arts as few kickboxing competition events could be found in Texas.

== Mixed martial arts career ==
=== Early career ===
Simpson started her amateur career in 2009. After amassing 2–1 record in 2009, she had a long hiatus from 2010 to 2016 where she had only one fight in 2013. She was signed by Invicta Fighting Championships (Invicta) after coming nearly a three-year layoff when she won over Satomi Takano at Pacific Xtreme Combat 52 with amassing a record of 4–1.

=== Invicta Fighting Championships ===
Simpson made her promotional debut on July 29, 2016, at Invicta FC 18: Grasso vs. Esquibel against Simona Soukupova. She won the fight unanimous decision.

Her next fight came ten months later on May 20, 2017, at Invicta FC 23: Porto vs. Niedzwiedz against Herica Tiburcio. She lost the fight via split decision.

On December 8, 2017, Simpson faced Amber Brown at Invicta FC 26: Maia vs. Niedzwiedz. She won the fight via a submission armbar on round one.

== Mixed martial arts record ==
Professional record breakdown
8 matches	5 wins	3 losses
By knockout	1	0
By submission	2	2
By decision	2	1

Res.	Record	Opponent	Method	Event	Date	Round	Time	Location	Notes
Loss	5–3	Amber Brown	Submission (armbar)	Invicta FC 26: Maia vs. Niedzwiedz	December 8, 2017	1	0:50	Kansas City, Missouri, United States	
Loss	5–2	Herica Tiburcio	Decision (split)	Invicta FC 23: Porto vs. Niedzwiedz	May 20, 2017	3	5:00	Kansas City, Missouri, United States	
Win	5–1	Simona Soukupova	Decision (unanimous)	Invicta FC 18: Grasso vs. Esquibel	July 29, 2016	3	5:00	Kansas City, Missouri, United States	
Win	4–1	Satomi Takano	Submission (mounted triangle keylock)	Pacific Xtreme Combat 52	March 13, 2016	3	2:01	Mangilao, Guam, Guam	
Win	3–1	Paulina Granados	Decision (unanimous)	Legacy Fighting Championship 23	September 13, 2013	3	5:00	San Antonio, Texas, United States	
Loss	2–1	Anita Rodriguez	Submission (scarf hold armlock)	Bully Bash and Brawl 2	August 8, 2009	2	0:56	Austin, Texas, United States	
Win	2–0	Hayley Cypert	TKO (punches)	Adrenaline: Feel The Rush	July 25, 2009	1	1:56	San Angelo, Texas, United States	
Win	1–0	Angelita Davis	Submission (triangle choke)	Shark Fights 3	March 14, 2009	1	0:48	Amarillo, Texas, United States	

== See also ==
- List of current Invicta FC fighters
- List of female mixed martial artists
