= Cassie Rodish =

American mixed martial artist

- Born: June 10, 1980 (age 46); Iowa, United States
- Other names: Sassy
- Height: 5 ft 1 in (1.55 m)
- Weight: 105 lb (48 kg; 7.5 st)
- Division: Atomweight
- Fighting out of: Des Moines, Iowa
- Team: Des Moines Jiu-jitsu

Mixed martial arts record
- Total: 9
- Wins: 5
- By knockout: 2
- By submission: 3
- Losses: 4
- By submission: 2
- By decision: 2

Other information
- Mixed martial arts record from Sherdog

Cassie Rodish is an American mixed martial artist who competes in the Atomweight division. She has fought in Invicta FC.

== Mixed martial arts record ==
Professional record breakdown
9 matches	5 wins	4 losses
By knockout	2	0
By submission	3	2
By decision	0	2

Res.	Record	Opponent	Method	Event	Date	Round	Time	Location	Notes
Win	5–4	Raquel Magdaleno	Submission (Rear-naked Choke)	RFA 19: Collier vs Checco	October 10, 2014	1	4:50	Prior Lake, Minnesota, United States	
Loss	4–4	Simona Soukupova	Submission (standing guillotine choke)	Invicta FC 5: Penne vs. Waterson	April 5, 2013	2	3:20	Kansas City, Missouri, United States	
Win	4–3	Stephanie Frausto	TKO (punches and elbows)	Invicta FC 4: Esparza vs. Hyatt	January 5, 2013	3	1:04	Kansas City, Kansas, United States	
Win	3–3	Summer Artherton	Submission (rear-naked choke)	MCC 43: High Octane	October 12, 2012	2	4:43	Des Moines, Iowa, United States	
Win	2–3	Meghan Wright	Submission (guillotine choke)	Invicta FC 1: Coenen vs. Ruyssen	April 28, 2012	1	0:36	Kansas City, Kansas, United States	
Win	1–3	Mariah Johnson	TKO (punches)	MCC 36: Back in Action	September 23, 2011	1	3:10	Des Moines, Iowa, United States	
Loss	0–3	Margarita Chavez	Decision (split)	ECSC Friday Night Fights 3	April 15, 2011	3	5:00	Clovis, New Mexico, United States	
Loss	0–2	Michele Gutierrez	Decision (unanimous)	XFO 36: Outdoor War 6	August 14, 2010	3	5:00	Island Lake, Illinois, United States	
Loss	0–1	Katy Klinefelter	Submission (triangle choke)	MCC 24: Reloaded	January 16, 2010	2	3:02	Des Moines, Iowa, United States	
