= Simona Soukupova =

Czech mixed martial artist

- Born: June 4, 1977 (age 49)
- Nationality: Czech
- Height: 5 ft 1 in (1.55 m)
- Weight: 115 lb (52 kg; 8.2 st)
- Division: Atomweight (MMA)
- Reach: 68.0 in (173 cm)
- Style: Muay Thai, Kickboxing, Boxing, Taekwondo, Judo
- Stance: Southpaw
- Years active: 2003–present

Mixed martial arts record
- Total: 13
- Wins: 6
- By knockout: 3
- By submission: 2
- By decision: 1
- Losses: 6
- By decision: 6
- Draws: 1

Other information
- Mixed martial arts record from Sherdog

Simona Soukupova is a Czech mixed martial artist who competes at Invicta FC in the Atomweight division and has fought 3 times for the organization.

== Mixed martial arts record ==
Professional record breakdown
13 matches	6 wins	6 losses
By knockout	3	0
By submission	2	0
By decision	1	6
Draws	1	

Res.	Record	Opponent	Method	Event	Date	Round	Time	Location	Notes
Loss	6–6–1	Svetlana Gotsyk	Decision (split)	WWFC 9	December 14, 2017	3	5:00	Kiev, Ukraine	
Win	6–5–1	Anna Bezhenar	Decision (unanimous)	XFN 2: World Cup of MMA	December 18, 2016	3	5:00	Prague, Czech Republic	
Loss	5–5–1	Herica Tiburcio	Decision (unanimous)	Invicta FC 20: Evinger vs. Kunitskaya	November 18, 2016	3	5:00	Kansas City, Missouri, United States	
Loss	5–4–1	Tessa Simpson	Decision (unanimous)	Invicta FC 18: Grasso vs. Esquibel	July 29, 2016	3	5:00	Kansas City, Missouri, United States	
Win	5–3–1	Iman Darabi	TKO (knees)	IRFA 8	May 23, 2015	2	1:35	Solna, Stockholm, Sweden	
Loss	4–3–1	Karolina Kowalkiewicz	Decision (unanimous)	KSW 24: Clash of the Giants	September 28, 2013	3	5:00	Łódź, Poland	
Win	4–2–1	Cassie Rodish	Submission (standing guillotine choke)	Invicta FC 5: Penne vs. Waterson	April 5, 2013	2	3:20	Kansas City, Missouri, United States	
Win	3–2–1	Elodie Puget	Submission (armbar)	Kayo MMA	November 24, 2012	1	4:21	Watford, England	
Draw	2–2–1	Katja Kankaanpaa	Draw (split)	Botnia Punishment 12	September 14, 2012	3	5:00	Seinajoki, Finland	
Loss	2–2	Felice Herrig	Decision (unanimous)	XFC 19: Charlotte Showdown	August 3, 2012	3	5:00	Charlotte, North Carolina, United States	
Loss	2–1	Karla Benitez	Decision (unanimous)	Hombres de Honor	August 19, 2011	3	5:00	Spain	
Win	2–0	Celine Haga	TKO (punches)	ECFF Night of Champions	November 10, 2010	2	1:50	Norwich, Norfolk, England	
Win	1–0	Lisa Newton	TKO (corner stoppage)	Kayo MMA	March 6, 2010	1	5:00	Watford, England	
