= Michelle Waterson-Gomez =

American mixed martial artist

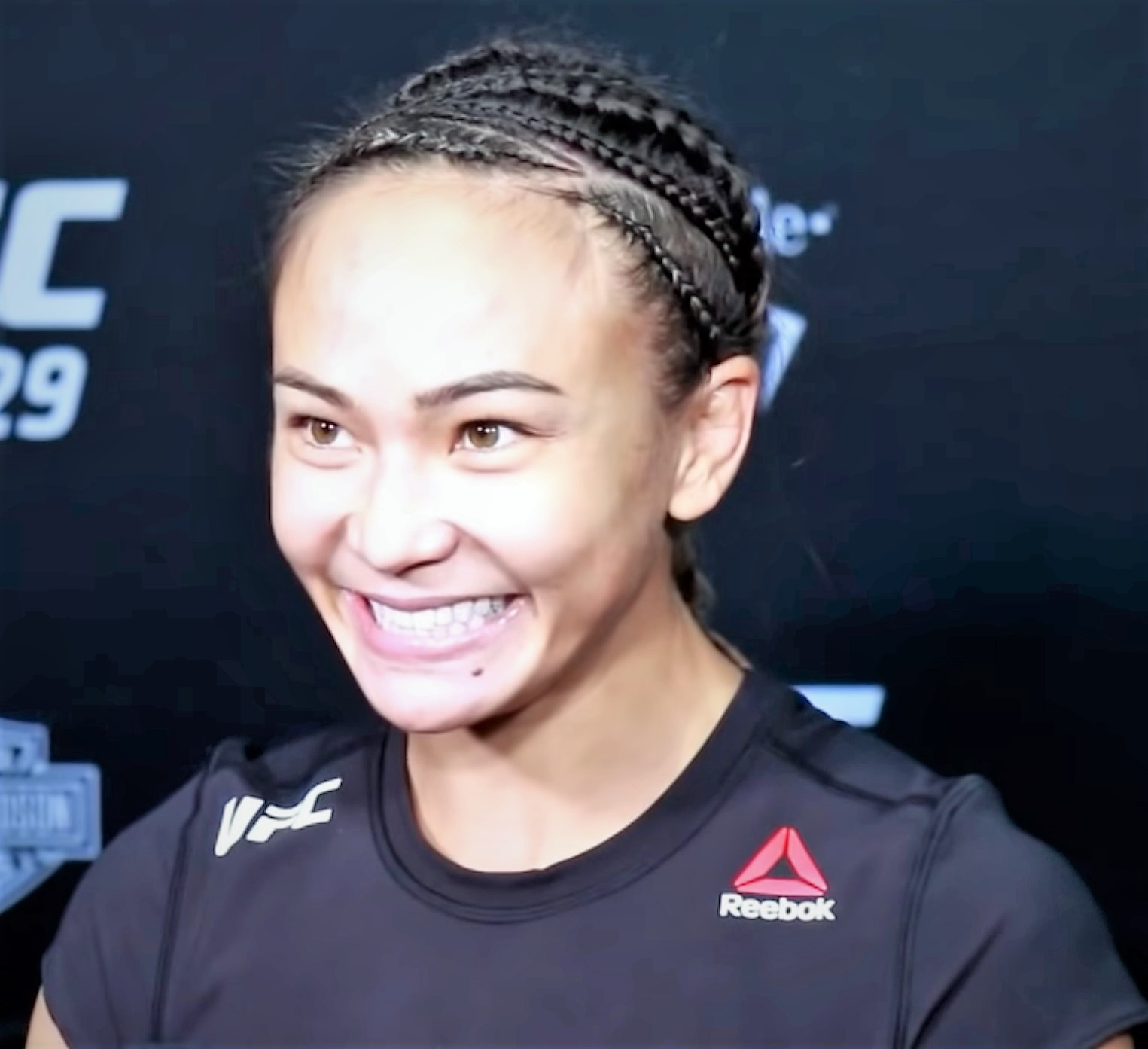
- Waterson interviewed after UFC 229
- Born: Michelle Eileen Waterson; January 6, 1986 (age 40); Colorado Springs, Colorado, U.S.
- Other names: The Karate Hottie
- Height: 5 ft 3 in (1.60 m)
- Weight: 115 lb (52 kg; 8.2 st)
- Division: Atomweight (2012–2015); Strawweight (2007–2012, 2015–2024); Flyweight (2008, 2021)
- Reach: 62 in (157 cm)
- Fighting out of: Albuquerque, New Mexico, U.S.
- Team: Jackson Wink MMA Academy (2007–present)
- Rank: Black belt in American freestyle karate Brown belt in Brazilian Jiu-Jitsu under Rafael de Freitas and Roberto Alencar
- Years active: 2007–2024 (MMA); 2008 (Kickboxing)

Kickboxing record
- Total: 1
- Wins: 0
- Losses: 1

Mixed martial arts record
- Total: 31
- Wins: 18
- By knockout: 3
- By submission: 9
- By decision: 6
- Losses: 13
- By knockout: 2
- By submission: 4
- By decision: 7

Other information
- Mixed martial arts record from Sherdog

Michelle Eileen Waterson-Gomez (born January 6, 1986) is an American former mixed martial artist, actress, stuntwoman, and model who competed in the Ultimate Fighting Championship (UFC). She is the former Invicta FC Atomweight Champion. Between 2013 and 2014, she was ranked the No. 1 women's atomweight fighter in the world.

== Early life ==
Born in Colorado Springs and raised in Aurora, Waterson is of European and Thai descent: her father is American and mother Thai. She began her modeling career in 2004 after she graduated from Aurora Central High School. She then attended the University of Denver, also working as a waitress at Hooters, until she realized she wanted to pursue a career in fighting.

== Early martial arts career ==
She had an early interest in gymnastics but an inability to pay for classes led her to karate at age 10.

Waterson-Gomez holds a black belt in American freestyle karate and has also trained in wushu, Muay Thai, Kickboxing, Brazilian jiu-jitsu, boxing and wrestling.

She rose to fame as a contestant on the Muay Thai-themed Fight Girls reality show on the Oxygen television network. She was also featured as one of the fighters in the MTV/MTV2 reality show Bully Beatdown.

== Mixed martial arts career ==
Waterson made her MMA debut on February 16, 2007, at Ring of Fire 28: Evolution against Andrea Miller, winning the fight by unanimous decision. She made her debut without having any amateur fights.

She faced Freestyle Cage Fighting champion Lynn Alvarez at Ring of Fire 31: Undisputed on December 1, 2007, but lost by submission in the first round.

Waterson made her Strikeforce debut against Tyra Parker at Strikeforce: Payback on October 3, 2008. She won the fight by rear naked choke submission in the first round.

Waterson faced Karina Taylor at Duke City MMA Series 1 on March 1, 2009. She won the fight by armbar submission in the first round. There was some controversy with this fight because Taylor did not tap out to the armbar.

On April 11, 2009, Waterson fought former WIBA and IFBA Flyweight Boxing Champion Elena Reid at Apache Gold: Extreme Beatdown. Reid won the fight by TKO in the second round.

Waterson faced the debuting Rosary Califano at EB - Beatdown at 4 Bears 6 and won by submission due to a flying armbar in just 15 seconds.

She faced Masako Yoshida at Crowbar MMA: Spring Brawl on April 24, 2010. Waterson won the fight by TKO in the first round.

Waterson returned to MMA on January 21, 2012. She faced Diana Rael at Jackson's MMA Series 7 and won the fight by rear-naked choke in the first round.

=== Invicta Fighting Championships ===
Waterson faced Lacey Schuckman at Invicta FC 3: Penne vs. Sugiyama on October 6, 2012. After three back and forth rounds, Waterson defeated Schuckman via split decision. The bout was named Fight of the Night.

Waterson challenged for the Invicta FC Atomweight Championship when she faced Jessica Penne in the main event of Invicta FC 5: Penne vs. Waterson on April 5, 2013. Waterson won the fight via armbar submission in the fourth round to become the Invicta FC Atomweight Champion. On September 6, 2014, Waterson successfully defended her championship against Yasuko Tamada in the main event of Invicta FC 8 via TKO in the third round.

Waterson next headlined Invicta FC 10 on December 5, 2014, in Houston against Brazilian Hérica Tibúrcio. She lost the fight via a guillotine choke submission in the third round.

=== Ultimate Fighting Championship ===
On April 28, 2015, it was reported that Waterson had officially signed with the UFC and was expected to compete in the Women's Strawweight division. Waterson made her promotional debut against Angela Magaña on July 12, 2015, at The Ultimate Fighter 21 Finale. She won the fight via submission in the third round.

Waterson was next expected to meet Tecia Torres at UFC 194. However, she was forced to pull out of the bout on November 24, 2015, citing a knee injury.

After over a year-and-a-half away from the sport due to injuries, Waterson returned in December 2016 to face Paige VanZant in the main event at UFC on Fox 22. She won the fight via technical submission due to a rear naked choke in the first round. The win also earned Waterson her first Performance of the Night bonus award.

Waterson fought Rose Namajunas on April 15, 2017, at UFC on Fox 24. She lost via rear naked choke. Waterson faced Tecia Torres on December 2, 2017, at UFC 218. She lost the fight by unanimous decision.

Waterson faced Cortney Casey at UFC on Fox 29 on April 14, 2018. She won the fight via split decision. Waterson next faced Felice Herrig on October 6, 2018, at UFC 229. She won the fight via unanimous decision.

Waterson fought Karolina Kowalkiewicz at UFC on ESPN 2 on March 30, 2019. She won the fight via unanimous decision.

Waterson faced Joanna Jędrzejczyk on October 12, 2019, at UFC Fight Night 161. She lost the fight via unanimous decision.

Waterson was scheduled to face Carla Esparza on April 11, 2020, at UFC Fight Night: Overeem vs. Harris. Due to the COVID-19 pandemic, the event was eventually postponed and the bout eventually took place on May 9, 2020, at UFC 249. She lost the fight via split decision.

Waterson was scheduled to meet Angela Hill on August 22, 2020, at UFC on ESPN 15. However, due to some personal reasons on Waterson's side, the bout was moved three weeks later to UFC Fight Night 177. She won the fight via split decision. This fight earned her the Fight of the Night award. After the fight, Waterson was awarded her BJJ brown belt in the octagon from her coach, Gracie Barra's Rafael 'Barata' Freitas.

Waterson was scheduled to face Amanda Ribas on January 24, 2021 at UFC 257. However, Waterson pulled out of the bout in early December due to undisclosed reasons. She was replaced by Marina Rodriguez. In May 2021, Waterson clarified that the reason for withdrawal was the loss of two grandparents.

Waterson faced Marina Rodriguez in a flyweight bout on May 8, 2021, at UFC on ESPN 24. She lost the fight via unanimous decision.

Waterson was scheduled to face Amanda Ribas on March 26, 2022, at UFC Fight Night 205. However, the bout was postponed to UFC 274 on May 7, 2022, due to Waterson sustaining an undisclosed injury.

Waterson faced Amanda Lemos on July 16, 2022, at UFC on ABC 3. She lost the fight via a guillotine choke submission in the second round.

Waterson faced Luana Pinheiro on April 8, 2023, at UFC 287. She lost the close bout via split decision.

Waterson faced Marina Rodriguez in a rematch on September 23, 2023, at UFC Fight Night 228. She lost the fight via technical knockout in round two.

Waterson was expected to face Gillian Robertson on June 1, 2024, at UFC 302. However, for unknown reasons, the bout was moved and eventually took place at UFC 303 on June 29, 2024. She lost the fight via unanimous decision, and subsequently announced her retirement from mixed martial arts competition.

== Championships and accomplishments ==
=== Mixed martial arts ===
- Ultimate Fighting Championship
  - Performance of the Night (One time) vs. Paige VanZant
  - Fight of the Night (One time) vs. Angela Hill
  - Tied (Ji Yeon Kim, Cynthia Calvillo, Marion Reneau & Istela Nunes) for the second longest losing streak in UFC Women's history (5) (behind Andrea Lee)
- Invicta Fighting Championships
  - Invicta FC Atomweight Championship (One time)
    - One successful title defense
  - Fight of the Night (Two times) vs. Lacey Schuckman and Hérica Tibúrcio
- Women's MMA Awards
  - 2013 Atomweight of the Year
  - 2013 Fight of the Year vs. Jessica Penne on April 5
  - 2014 Fight of the Year vs. Hérica Tibúrcio on December 5
- AwakeningFighters.com WMMA Awards
  - 2013 Atomweight of the Year
  - 2014 Atomweight of the Year
- FightBooth.com
  - 2014 Most Vulgar Display of Power Award (Beatdown of the Year) vs. Yasuko Tamada
- MMAjunkie.com
  - 2020 September Fight of the Month vs. Angela Hill

== Personal life ==
Waterson is married to former U.S. Armed Forces amateur boxing champion Joshua Gomez. On September 16, 2010, Waterson announced that she was pregnant with her first child and recently engaged. She gave birth to a daughter on March 18, 2011.

Waterson got her "Karate Hottie" nickname while a spokesmodel for a bikini website.

== Media appearances ==
In 2008, Knockouts released a calendar featuring her.

She is featured in the music video for Head Crusher, the first single from the Endgame album by the American Metal band Megadeth.

Waterson performed some stunts for Natalie Portman in the Marvel movie Thor.

On June 24, 2014, she appeared on American Ninja Warrior but failed to qualify when she fell on the first obstacle.

She was also featured on Bully Beatdown. She was the central character of the 2016 documentary Fight Mom.

In 2017, Waterson competed on the special mini-series for the MTV reality show The Challenge titled Champs vs. Stars. That same year, she was featured in The Body Issue.

== Selected filmography ==
Year	Film	Role	Notes
2010	MacGruber	Club Babe #1	Stunt double: Kristen Wiig
2011	Thor		Utility stunts
2011	Fright Night	Vamp #2	
2012	Jackie	Chinese waitress	
2013	Odd Thomas		Stunts
2013	The Lone Ranger		Stunts
2014	The Signal		Stunt double: Olivia Cooke
2014	Transcendence		Stunts
2016	Independence Day: Resurgence		Stunts
2018	Crossed Lines	Trish Koi	Main character
2022	The Cleaning Lady	MMA Fighter #1	Episode: "TNT"
2025	Havoc	Assassin	

== Mixed martial arts record ==
Professional record breakdown
31 matches	18 wins	13 losses
By knockout	3	2
By submission	9	4
By decision	6	7

Res.	Record	Opponent	Method	Event	Date	Round	Time	Location	Notes
Loss	18–13	Gillian Robertson	Decision (unanimous)	UFC 303	June 29, 2024	3	5:00	Las Vegas, Nevada, United States	
Loss	18–12	Marina Rodriguez	TKO (elbows and punches)	UFC Fight Night: Fiziev vs. Gamrot	September 23, 2023	2	2:42	Las Vegas, Nevada, United States	
Loss	18–11	Luana Pinheiro	Decision (split)	UFC 287	April 8, 2023	3	5:00	Miami, Florida, United States	
Loss	18–10	Amanda Lemos	Submission (guillotine choke)	UFC on ABC: Ortega vs. Rodríguez	July 16, 2022	2	1:48	Elmont, New York, United States	
Loss	18–9	Marina Rodriguez	Decision (unanimous)	UFC on ESPN: Rodriguez vs. Waterson	May 8, 2021	5	5:00	Las Vegas, Nevada, United States	Flyweight bout.
Win	18–8	Angela Hill	Decision (split)	UFC Fight Night: Waterson vs. Hill	September 12, 2020	5	5:00	Las Vegas, Nevada, United States	Fight of the Night.
Loss	17–8	Carla Esparza	Decision (split)	UFC 249	May 9, 2020	3	5:00	Jacksonville, Florida, United States	
Loss	17–7	Joanna Jędrzejczyk	Decision (unanimous)	UFC Fight Night: Joanna vs. Waterson	October 12, 2019	5	5:00	Tampa, Florida, United States	
Win	17–6	Karolina Kowalkiewicz	Decision (unanimous)	UFC on ESPN: Barboza vs. Gaethje	March 30, 2019	3	5:00	Philadelphia, Pennsylvania, United States	
Win	16–6	Felice Herrig	Decision (unanimous)	UFC 229	October 6, 2018	3	5:00	Las Vegas, Nevada, United States	
Win	15–6	Cortney Casey	Decision (split)	UFC on Fox: Poirier vs. Gaethje	April 14, 2018	3	5:00	Glendale, Arizona, United States	
Loss	14–6	Tecia Torres	Decision (unanimous)	UFC 218	December 2, 2017	3	5:00	Detroit, Michigan, United States	
Loss	14–5	Rose Namajunas	Submission (rear-naked choke)	UFC on Fox: Johnson vs. Reis	April 15, 2017	2	2:47	Kansas City, Missouri, United States	
Win	14–4	Paige VanZant	Technical Submission (rear-naked choke)	UFC on Fox: VanZant vs. Waterson	December 17, 2016	1	3:21	Sacramento, California, United States	Performance of the Night.
Win	13–4	Angela Magaña	Submission (rear-naked choke)	The Ultimate Fighter: American Top Team vs. Blackzilians Finale	July 12, 2015	3	2:38	Las Vegas, Nevada, United States	Return to Strawweight.
Loss	12–4	Hérica Tibúrcio	Submission (guillotine choke)	Invicta FC 10: Waterson vs. Tiburcio	December 5, 2014	3	1:06	Houston, Texas, United States	Lost the Invicta FC Atomweight Championship. Fight of the Night.
Win	12–3	Yasuko Tamada	TKO (knee and punch)	Invicta FC 8: Waterson vs. Tamada	September 6, 2014	3	4:58	Kansas City, Missouri, United States	Defended the Invicta FC Atomweight Championship.
Win	11–3	Jessica Penne	Submission (armbar)	Invicta FC 5: Penne vs. Waterson	April 5, 2013	4	2:31	Kansas City, Missouri, United States	Won the Invicta FC Atomweight Championship.
Win	10–3	Lacey Schuckman	Decision (split)	Invicta FC 3: Penne vs. Sugiyama	October 6, 2012	3	5:00	Kansas City, Kansas, United States	Atomweight debut. Fight of the Night.
Win	9–3	Diana Rael	Submission (rear-naked choke)	Jackson's MMA Series 7	January 21, 2012	1	2:12	Albuquerque, New Mexico, United States	
Win	8–3	Masako Yoshida	TKO (punches)	Crowbar MMA: Spring Brawl	April 24, 2010	1	4:17	Fargo, North Dakota, United States	
Win	7–3	Rosary Califano	Submission (flying armbar)	Beatdown at 4 Bears 6	February 13, 2010	1	0:15	New Town, North Dakota, United States	
Loss	6–3	Elena Reid	TKO (punches)	Apache Gold: Extreme Beatdown	April 11, 2009	2	1:50	Phoenix, Arizona, United States	
Win	6–2	Karina Taylor	Technical Submission (armbar)	Duke City MMA Series 1	March 14, 2009	1	2:36	Albuquerque, New Mexico, United States	
Win	5–2	Tyra Parker	Submission (rear-naked choke)	Strikeforce: Payback	October 3, 2008	1	1:20	Denver, Colorado, United States	Flyweight bout.
Win	4–2	Krystal Macatol	Submission (armbar)	SCA: Bike n Brawl 2	August 23, 2008	1	0:22	Albuquerque, New Mexico, United States	
Win	3–2	Thricia Poovey	TKO (corner stoppage)	KOTC: Badlands	July 12, 2008	2	5:00	Albuquerque, New Mexico, United States	
Loss	2–2	Lynn Alvarez	Submission (guillotine choke)	Ring of Fire 31: Undisputed	December 1, 2007	1	1:19	Broomfield, Colorado, United States	
Win	2–1	Jaime Cook	Submission (armbar)	Ring of Fire 30: Domination	September 15, 2007	1	1:33	Broomfield, Colorado, United States	
Loss	1–1	Alicia Gumm	Decision (unanimous)	RMBB: Battle of the Arts	June 30, 2007	2	5:00	Denver, Colorado, United States	
Win	1–0	Andrea Miller	Decision (unanimous)	Ring of Fire 28: Evolution	February 16, 2007	3	3:00	Broomfield, Colorado, United States	

== Kickboxing record ==
Kickboxing record
0 wins, 1 loss, 0 draws
Date	Result	Opponent	Event	Location	Method	Round	Time
2008-03-22	Loss	(United States) Catia Vitoria	XFA 1	Las Vegas, Nevada, USA	Decision (unanimous)	3	3:00
Legend: Win Loss Draw/No contest Notes

== See also ==
- List of female mixed martial artists

Awards and achievements
Preceded by Jessica Penne	2nd Invicta FC Atomweight Champion; April 5, 2013 – December 5, 2014	Succeeded by Hérica Tibúrcio
