= Satomi Takano =

Japanese mixed martial artist

- Born: June 19, 1990 (age 36); Toyama, Japan
- Native name: 高野聡美
- Other names: SARAMI
- Nationality: Japanese
- Height: 5 ft 1 in (1.55 m)
- Weight: 108 lb (49 kg; 7 st 10 lb)
- Division: Atomweight
- Style: Catch wrestling, Judo
- Stance: Orthodox
- Fighting out of: Toyama, Japan
- Team: PANCRASEism Yokohama
- Years active: 2012 – present

Kickboxing record
- Total: 1
- Draws: 1

Mixed martial arts record
- Total: 35
- Wins: 20
- By knockout: 3
- By submission: 6
- By decision: 11
- Losses: 15
- By knockout: 4
- By submission: 3
- By decision: 8

Other information
- University: Kinjo University
- Mixed martial arts record from Sherdog

Satomi Takano (Japanese: 高野聡美, Takano Satomi; born June 19, 1990) is a Japanese mixed martial artist, currently competing in the atomweight division of Pancrase. She is the current Pancrase Atomweight champion and the former Shooto Super Atomweight champion.

== Mixed martial arts career ==
=== DEEP JEWELS ===
==== Early career ====
Takano made her professional debut against Yukiko Seki at JEWELS: 20th Ring on July 21, 2012, and won the fight by unanimous decision. She amassed a 3-5 record over her next eight fights, with a notable three-fight losing streak to Mina Kurobe, Saori Ishioka and Naho Sugiyama.

Takano was scheduled to make her Road FC and Korean debut against Ga Yeon Song at Road FC 020 on December 14, 2014. She won the fight by a first-round submission.

Takano participated in the DEEP JEWELS featherweight tournament, held to crown the inaugural Jewels featherweight (-48 kg) champion. Takano first faced Masako Yoshida in the tournament quarterfinal bout at Deep Jewels 7 on February 20, 2015, and won by unanimous decision. She faced Tomo Maesawa in the tournament semifinals, held at Deep Jewels 8 on May 31, 2015. She won the fight by unanimous decision, and advanced to the finals of the one-day tournament, where she faced Mei Yamaguchi. Yamaguchi won the fight by a second-round technical knockout.

==== Second title run ====
Takano was scheduled to make her second appearance with Road FC against Jeong Eun Park at Road FC 025 on August 22, 2015. She won the fight by majority decision.

Takano was scheduled to face Emi Tomimatsu at Deep Jewels 10 on November 22, 2015. She lost the fight by split decision. Takano was next scheduled to face Tessa Simpson at PXC 52 on August 13, 2016, as a replacement for Mei Yamaguchi. She lost the fight by a third-round submission.

Takano was scheduled to face Miyuki Furusawa at Deep Jewels 14 on November 2, 2016, and won the fight by a first-round technical submission. Takano next faced Ye Jin Jung at Deep Jewels 15 on February 25, 2017, and won the fight by a 39-second guillotine choke. She was afterwards scheduled to fought a rematch with Tomo Maesawa at Deep Jewels 16 on May 20, 2017, and won by a second-round technical knockout.

Takano was next scheduled to fight a rematch with Emi Tomimatsu at Deep Jewels 17 on August 26, 2017. Tomimatsu won the fight by split decision. Takano was then scheduled to face Tomo Maesawa in a trilogy bout at Deep Jewels 18. Takano won the fight by unanimous decision, increasing her overall score against Measawa to 3-0.

Takano's third victory against Measawa earned her the right to challenge Mina Kurobe for the DEEP JEWELS Atomweight Championship at Deep Jewels 19 on March 10, 2018. Kurobe won the fight by unanimous decision.

==== Later career ====
Takano was scheduled to face Alyssa Garcia at DEEP 85 Impact on August 26, 2018. Garcia won the fight by knockout, flooring Takano with a headkick at the 2:05 minute mark of the second round.

Takano was scheduled to face Yuko Saito at Deep Jewels 22 on December 1, 2018. She won the fight by unanimous decision.

Takano made her strawweight and ONE Championship debut against Michele Ferreira at ONE Warrior Series 6 on June 20, 2019. She won the fight by a second-round submission, forcing Ferreira to tap to an armbar.

Takano made her second strawweight appearance against So Yul Kim at ONE Warrior Series 8 on October 5, 2019. She lost the fight by unanimous decision.

=== Shooto ===
Takano made her promotional debut with Shooto against Megumi Sugimoto, in a 51 kg catchweight bout, at Shooto 2020 Vol. 7 on November 23, 2020. She won the fight by a first-round submission, forcing Sugimoto to tap at the midway point of the round.

Takano returned to atomweight for her next bout, against Miku Nakamura at Shooto 2021 Vol.5 on July 25, 2021, in a title eliminator bout. She won the fight by a second-round technical knockout.

==== Shooto Atomweight champion ====
Her victory against Nakamura earned Takano the chance to challenge the reigning Shooto Super Atomweight champion Mina Kurobe at Shooto 2021 Vol.7 on November 6, 2021. He won the fight by unanimous decision, with scores of 49-46, 49-45 and 48-47. Following this victory, she was recognized as the fourth best atomweight in the world by Fight Matrix.

Takano was booked face Kanna Asakura on April 17, 2022 at Rizin 35. She lost the fight by unanimous decision.

Takano faced Laura Fontoura at Rizin Landmark 4 on November 6, 2022. She won the fight by unanimous decision.

Takano made her first Shooto Super Atomweight title defense against Ayaka Watanabe at Shooto Colors 1 on May 21, 2023. She lost the fight by a second-round technical knockout.

=== Pancrase ===
Takano faced Zenny Huang in the semifinals of the Pancrase Women's Atomweight Championship tournament on December 24, 2023 at Pancrase 340. She won the bout via unanimous decision. Takano faced Sayako Fujita for the inaugural Pancrase Women's Atomweight Championship in the tournament finals on March 31, 2024 at Pancrase 341. She won the bout by a first-round knockout.

Takano faced Hong Ye-rin in a non-title bout at Pancrase 347 on September 29, 2024. She won the fight by unanimous decision, with three scorecards of 30—27 in her favor.

== Championships and accomplishments ==
- Shooto
  - Shooto Super Atomweight Championship
- Pancrase
  - Pancrase Atomweight Championship
- Jewels
  - Deep Jewels Featherweight (-48 kg) Tournament Runner-up

== Mixed martial arts record ==
Professional record breakdown
35 matches	20 wins	15 losses
By knockout	3	4
By submission	6	3
By decision	11	8

Res.	Record	Opponent	Method	Event	Date	Round	Time	Location	Notes
Loss	20–15	Miki Motono	TKO (punches)	Pancrase 366	September 23, 2026	2	4:09	Tachikawa, Japan	Strawweight debut. For the Pancrase Women's Strawweight Championship.
Win	20–14	Hong Ye-rin	Decision (unanimous)	Pancrase 347	September 29, 2024	3	5:00	Tokyo, Japan	Non-title bout.
Win	19–14	Sayako Fujita	KO (punches)	Pancrase 341	March 31, 2024	1	0:48	Tokyo, Japan	Won the inaugural Pancrase Women's Atomweight Championship.
Win	18–14	Zenny Huang	Decision (unanimous)	Pancrase 340	December 24, 2023	3	5:00	Yokohama, Japan	
Loss	17–14	Ayaka Watanabe	TKO (head kick and punches)	Shooto Colors 1	May 21, 2023	2	2:36	Tokyo, Japan	Lost the Shooto Super Atomweight Championship.
Win	17–13	Laura Fontoura	Decision (unanimous)	Rizin Landmark 4	November 6, 2022	3	5:00	Nagoya, Japan	
Loss	16–13	Kanna Asakura	Decision (unanimous)	Rizin 35	April 17, 2022	3	5:00	Chōfu, Japan	
Win	16–12	Mina Kurobe	Decision (unanimous)	Shooto 2021 Vol.7	November 6, 2021	5	5:00	Tokyo, Japan	Won the Shooto Super Atomweight Championship.
Win	15–12	Miku Nakamura	TKO (punches)	Shooto 2021 Vol.5	July 25, 2021	2	2:48	Tokyo, Japan	Return to Super Atomweight (108 lbs).
Win	14–12	Megumi Sugimoto	Submission (armbar)	Shooto 2020 Vol. 7	November 23, 2020	1	2:46	Tokyo, Japan	Catchweight (112 lb) bout.
Loss	13–12	Kim So-yul	Decision (unanimous)	ONE Warrior Series 8	October 5, 2019	3	5:00	Tokyo, Japan	
Win	13–11	Michele Ferreira	Submission (armbar)	ONE Warrior Series 6	June 20, 2019	2	2:56	Kallang, Singapore	Strawweight debut.
Win	12–11	Yuko Saito	Decision (unanimous)	Deep Jewels 22	December 1, 2018	3	5:00	Tokyo, Japan	
Loss	11–11	Alyssa Garcia	KO (head kick and punches)	DEEP 85 Impact	August 26, 2018	2	2:05	Tokyo, Japan	
Loss	11–10	Mina Kurobe	Decision (unanimous)	Deep Jewels 19	March 10, 2018	5	5:00	Tokyo, Japan	For the Jewels Atomweight Championship.
Win	11–9	Tomo Maesawa	Decision (unanimous)	Deep Jewels 18	December 2, 2017	3	5:00	Tokyo, Japan	
Loss	10–9	Emi Tomimatsu	Decision (split)	Deep Jewels 17	August 26, 2017	2	5:00	Tokyo, Japan	
Win	10–8	Tomo Maesawa	TKO (punches)	Deep Jewels 16	May 20, 2017	2	4:42	Tokyo, Japan	
Win	9–8	Jung Ye-jin	Submission (guillotine choke)	Deep Jewels 15	February 25, 2017	1	0:39	Tokyo, Japan	
Win	8–8	Miyuki Furusawa	Technical Submission (armbar)	Deep Jewels 14	November 2, 2016	1	3:53	Tokyo, Japan	
Loss	7–8	Tessa Simpson	Submission (mounted triangle keylock)	Pacific Xtreme Combat 52	August 13, 2016	3	2:01	Mangilao, Guam	
Loss	7–7	Emi Tomimatsu	Decision (split)	Deep Jewels 10	November 22, 2015	3	5:00	Tokyo, Japan	
Win	7–6	Jeong Eun Park	Decision (majority)	Road FC 025	August 22, 2015	2	5:00	Wonju, South Korea	
Loss	6–6	Mei Yamaguchi	TKO (punches)	Deep Jewels 8	May 31, 2015	2	4:57	Tokyo, Japan	Jewels Featherweight Grand Prix Final. For the vacant Jewels Featherweight Championship.
Win	6–5	Tomo Maesawa	Decision (unanimous)	Deep Jewels 8	May 31, 2015	2	5:00	Tokyo, Japan	Jewels Featherweight Grand Prix Semifinal.
Win	5–5	Masako Yoshida	Decision (unanimous)	Deep Jewels 7	February 20, 2015	2	5:00	Tokyo, Japan	Jewels Featherweight Grand Prix Quarterfinal.
Win	4–5	Song Ga-yeon	Submission (inverted triangle kimura)	Road FC 020	December 14, 2014	1	4:21	Seoul, South Korea	
Loss	3–5	Mina Kurobe	Technical Submission (rear-naked choke)	Deep Jewels 6	November 3, 2014	1	4:02	Tokyo, Japan	
Loss	3–4	Saori Ishioka	Technical Submission (armbar)	Deep Jewels 4	May 17, 2014	1	4:44	Tokyo, Japan	
Loss	3–3	Naho Sugiyama	Decision (split)	Deep Jewels 3	February 16, 2014	2	5:00	Tokyo, Japan	
Win	3–2	Miyoko Kusaka	Submission (armbar)	DEEP Toyama Impact Rookies 3	November 17, 2013	1	4:04	Toyama, Japan	
Loss	2–2	Masako Yoshida	Decision (unanimous)	Deep Jewels 1	August 31, 2013	2	5:00	Tokyo, Japan	
Loss	2–1	Yasuko Tamada	Decision (unanimous)	JEWELS: 22nd Ring	December 15, 2012	2	5:00	Tokyo, Japan	
Win	2–0	Fukuko Hamada	Decision (unanimous)	JEWELS: 21st Ring	September 22, 2012	2	5:00	Tokyo, Japan	
Win	1–0	Yukiko Seki	Decision (unanimous)	JEWELS: 20th Ring	July 21, 2012	2	5:00	Tokyo, Japan	

== Kickboxing record ==
Professional Kickboxing Record
0 Wins (0 (T)KO's, 1 Decision), 0 Losses, 1 Draw, 0 No Contests
Date	Result	Opponent	Event	Location	Method	Round	Time
2013-03-25	Draw	(Japan) Kaoru Chatani	JEWELS: 24th Ring	Tokyo, Japan	Decision (Split)	3	2:00
Legend: Win Loss Draw/No contest Notes

== See also ==
- List of Shooto champions
- List of current mixed martial arts champions
