= Mina Kurobe =

Japanese mixed martial artist

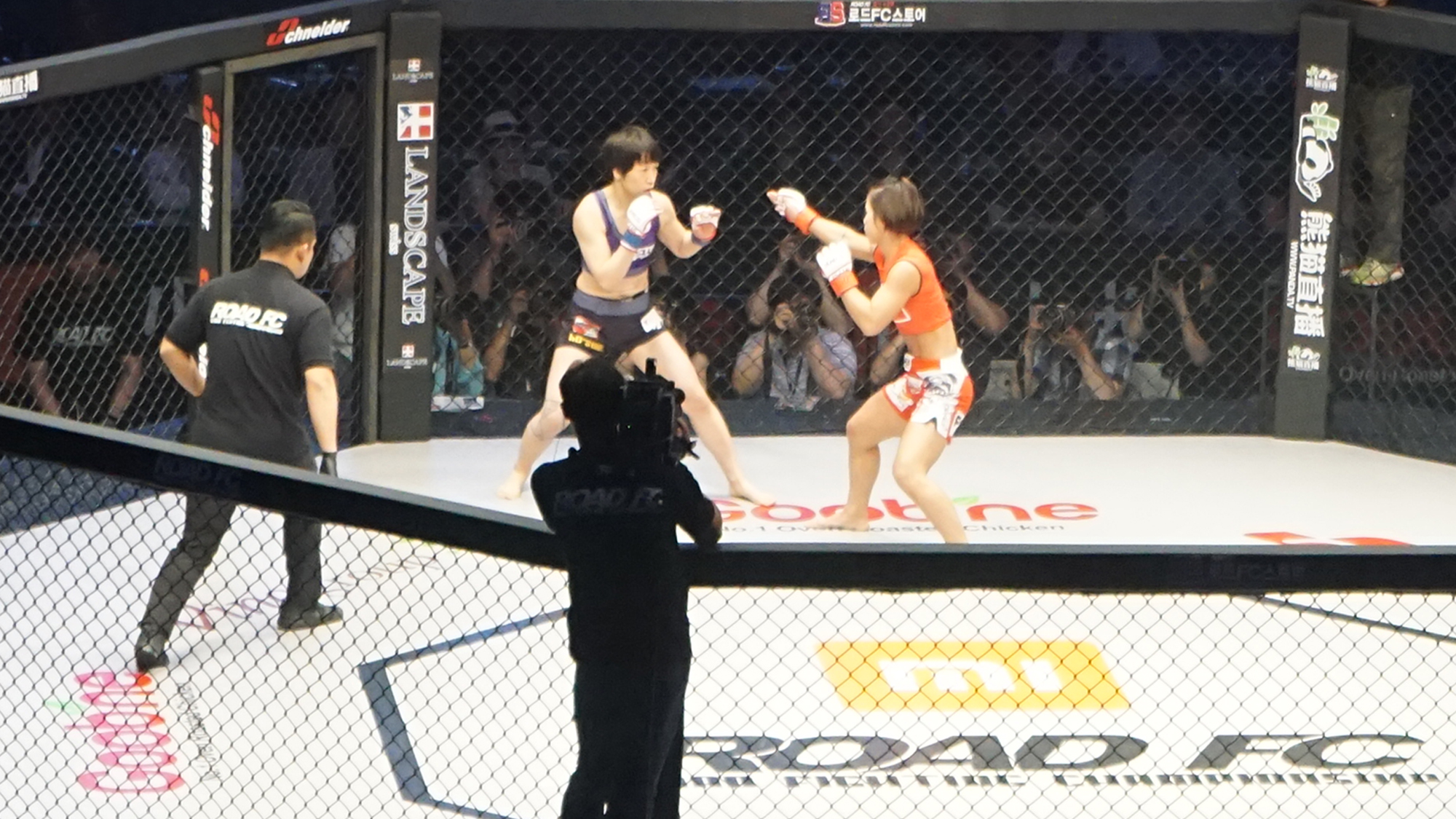
- Kurobe (left) fighting Seo Hee Ham, 2017
- Born: May 2, 1977 (age 49); Arakawa-ku, Tokyo, Japan
- Native name: 黒部三奈
- Nationality: Japanese
- Height: 5 ft 2 in (1.57 m)
- Weight: 110.2 lb (50 kg; 7 st 12 lb)
- Division: Atomweight
- Fighting out of: Kanda-Misakichō, Chiyoda, Tokyo, Japan
- Team: Master Team
- Trainer: Kuniyoshi Hironaka
- Rank: Brown belt in Brazilian Jiu Jitsu
- Years active: 2012–present

Mixed martial arts record
- Total: 25
- Wins: 18
- By knockout: 3
- By submission: 5
- By decision: 10
- Losses: 7
- By knockout: 2
- By submission: 1
- By decision: 4

Other information
- Mixed martial arts record from Sherdog

Mina Kurobe (黒部三奈; born 2 May 1977) is a Japanese mixed martial artist, currently fighting in the super atomweight division of Shooto, where she is the former and inaugural Shooto Super Atomweight champion. A professional competitor since 2012, Kurobe is also the former DEEP JEWELS Atomweight champion.

In June 2021, she is the #9 ranked atomweight in the world according to Sherdog.

== Mixed martial arts career ==
=== DEEP JEWELS ===
==== Early career ====
Kurobe made her professional debut against Naomi Taniyama at JEWELS: 22nd Ring. She won the fight by a second round rear naked choke.

Kurobe made her second appearance with JEWELS at JEWELS: 23rd Ring, against Tomo Maesawa. Kurobe once again won by rear naked choke, submitting Maesawa in the first round of the bout.

Kurobe was scheduled to fight Masako Yoshida at Deep Jewels 5. She beat Yoshida by unanimous decision.

Following a first-round submission of Satomi Takano at Deep Jewels 6, Kurobe was scheduled to fight Emi Tomimatsu in the co-main event of Deep Jewels 7. Her fight with Tomimatsu was one of four quarterfinal bouts of the DEEP JEWELS Featherweight (-48 kg) Grand Prix. Kurobe won the fight by split decision, with her pressure and volume swaying two of the three judges to score the bout in her favor. Advancing to the semifinals, Kurobe faced Mei Yamaguchi at Deep Jewels 8. Kurobe lost to the eventual tournament winner by unanimous decision.

Kurobe was next scheduled to fight the former JEWELS Featherweight champion Naho Sugiyama at Deep Jewels 10. She lost the fight by unanimous decision.

==== Title run ====
Following her first two professional losses, Kurobe was scheduled to fight Hana Date at Deep Jewels 11. Kurobe won the fight by unanimous decision. In her next fight, Kurobe was scheduled to fight the second date sister, Renju Date, at Deep Jewels 12. She beat Renju by a first-round technical knockout.

Kurobe was scheduled to fight a rematch with Tomo Maesawa at Deep Jewels 13. The two had previously fought at JEWELS: 23rd Ring, with Kurobe winning by a first-round submission. Kurobe won the rematch by unanimous decision.

Kurobe was scheduled to fight Saori Ishioka in the main event of Deep Jewels 14. Kurobe beat Ishioka by unanimous decision.

==== DEEP JEWELS Atomweight champion ====
Kurobe was scheduled to fight the reigning DEEP JEWELS Atomweight champion Naho Sugiyama at Deep Jewels 15, at the age of 39. Kurobe was dominant throughout the bout, mixing in volume striking with takedown attempts. She won the fight by a unanimous decision.

Kurobe was next scheduled to fight Seo Hee Ham for the vacant Road FC Women's Atomweight title at Road FC 039. Ham won the fight by a third-round technical knockout.

Kurobe was scheduled to fight Jeong Eun Park in a non-title bout at DEEP 81 Impact. She beat Park by a unanimous decision.

Kurobe made her first title defense against Satomi Takano at Deep Jewels 19. She beat Takano by unanimous decision.

Kurobe had her second fight outside of JEWELS on September 30, 2018, when she was scheduled to fight Ayaka Hamasaki at Rizin 13. Hamasaki won the fight by a first-round submission, locking in a kimura with 15 seconds left in the round.

Kurobe was scheduled to make her second title defense in a trilogy bout with Tomo Maesawa at Deep Jewels 22. Kurobe had won their previous two encounters, winning by submission the first time and by decision the second time. Maesawa won the tightly contested bout by split decision.

=== Shooto ===
==== Shooto Super Atomweight tournament ====
Kurobe was scheduled to fight Ye Ji Lee in her Shooto debut, at Shooto 30th Anniversary Tour 6th Round. Kurobe won the fight by a second-round submission, submitting Lee with a rear naked choke at the very end of the round.

Following her victory over Lee, Kurobe was scheduled to participate in the Shooto Super Atomweight tournament, held to determine the inaugural champion. Kurobe was scheduled to fight Tanja Angerer at Shooto 30th Anniversary Tour, in the tournament quarterfinals. She beat Angerer by a second-round technical knockout, stopping her opponent with ground-and-pound near the end of round.

Advancing to the tournament semifinals, Kurobe was scheduled to fight the future DEEP JEWELS Atomweight champion Saori Oshima, at Shooto 2020 vol.3. Kurobe won the fight by a third-round technical knockout.

==== Shooto Super Atomweight champion ====
Kurobe was scheduled to face Megumi Sugimoto in the finals of the Shooto Super Atomweight tournament at Shooto 2020 Vol. 5. Despite the COVID-19 restrictions, the event was held in front of a live audience at the Korakuen Hall. Kurobe won the fight by a dominant unanimous decision, with all three judges scoring the bout 30-27 in her favor. Aside from winning the inaugural title, Kurobe was also given a 1 million yen award for winning the tournament.

Kurobe was expected to face Satomi Takano in her first title defense, at a location and date which to be determined later. The bout was later announced as the co-main event of Professional Shooto 2021 Vol. 7, which will be held on November 6, 2021. Kurobe lost the fight by unanimous decision, with scores of 49-46, 49-45 and 48-47.

==== Post title reign ====
Kurobe faced Momoka Hoshuyama, in her first fight post-title loss, at Professional Shooto 2022. Kurobe won the fight by unanimous decision, utilizing her wrestling to out-grapple Hoshuyama throughout the two round bout.

Kurobe was booked to face Seo Young Park at Shooto 2022 Vol. 7 on July 17, 2022. She won the fight by a second-round submission, forcing Park to tap with a rear-naked choke.

Kurobe faced Ayaka Watanabe on January 15, 2023 at Shooto 2023 Opening Round, losing the bout when she got knocked out in the second round.

== Championships and accomplishments ==
- DEEP JEWELS
  - DEEP JEWELS Atomweight Championship
    - One successful title defense
- Shooto
  - Shooto Super Atomweight Championship

== Mixed martial arts record ==
Professional record breakdown
25 matches	18 wins	7 losses
By knockout	3	2
By submission	5	1
By decision	10	4

Res.	Record	Opponent	Method	Event	Date	Round	Time	Location	Notes
Loss	18–7	Ayaka Watanabe	KO (punch)	Shooto 2023 Opening Round	January 15, 2023	2	2:29	Tokyo, Japan	
Win	18–6	Seo Young Park	Submission (rear-naked choke)	Shooto 2022 Vol. 5	July 17, 2022	2	1:34	Bunkyō, Japan	
Win	17–6	Momoka Hoshuyama	Decision (unanimous)	Shooto 2022 Opening Round	January 16, 2022	2	5:00	Bunkyō, Japan	
Loss	16–6	Satomi Takano	Decision (unanimous)	Shooto 2021 Vol. 7	November 5, 2021	5	5:00	Tokyo, Japan	Lost the Shooto Super Atomweight Championship.
Win	16–5	Megumi Sugimoto	Decision (unanimous)	Shooto 2020 Vol. 5	August 1, 2020	5	5:00	Tokyo, Japan	Super Atomweight tournament finals. Won the inaugural Shooto Super Atomweight Championship.
Win	15–5	Saori Oshima	TKO (punches)	Shooto 2020 vol.3	May 31, 2020	3	1:54	Tokyo, Japan	Shooto Super Atomweight tournament semifinals.
Win	14–5	Tanja Angerer	TKO (punches)	Shooto 30th Anniversary Tour	November 24, 2019	2	4:52	Tokyo, Japan	Shooto Super Atomweight tournament quarterfinals. Return to Super Atomweight.
Win	13–5	Ye Ji Lee	Technical Submission (rear-naked choke)	Shooto 30th Anniversary Tour 6th Round	July 15, 2019	2	4:48	Tokyo, Japan	
Loss	12–5	Tomo Maesawa	Decision (split)	Deep Jewels 22	December 1, 2018	5	5:00	Tokyo, Japan	Loses the DEEP JEWELS Atomweight Championship
Loss	12–4	Ayaka Hamasaki	Submission (kimura)	Rizin 13	September 30, 2018	1	4:45	Saitama, Japan	Super Atomweight (108 lb) bout.
Win	12–3	Satomi Takano	Decision (unanimous)	Deep Jewels 19	March 10, 2018	5	5:00	Tokyo, Japan	Defends the DEEP JEWELS Atomweight Championship
Win	11–3	Jeong Eun Park	Decision (unanimous)	DEEP 81 Impact	December 23, 2017	3	5:00	Tokyo, Japan	
Loss	10–3	Seo Hee Ham	TKO (punches)	Road FC 039	June 10, 2017	3	4:13	Seoul, South Korea	For the Road FC Women's Atomweight Championship
Win	10–2	Naho Sugiyama	Decision (unanimous)	Deep Jewels 15	February 25, 2017	5	5:00	Tokyo, Japan	Wins the DEEP JEWELS Atomweight Championship
Win	9–2	Saori Ishioka	Decision (unanimous)	Deep Jewels 14	November 2, 2016	3	5:00	Tokyo, Japan	
Win	8–2	Tomo Maesawa	Decision (unanimous)	Deep Jewels 13	August 27, 2016	2	5:00	Tokyo, Japan	
Win	7–2	Renju Date	TKO (punches)	Deep Jewels 12	June 5, 2016	1	1:29	Tokyo, Japan	
Win	6–2	Hana Date	Decision (unanimous)	Deep Jewels 11	March 5, 2016	2	5:00	Tokyo, Japan	
Loss	5–2	Naho Sugiyama	Decision (unanimous)	Deep Jewels 10	November 22, 2015	2	5:00	Tokyo, Japan	
Loss	5–1	Mei Yamaguchi	Decision (unanimous)	Deep Jewels 8	May 31, 2015	2	5:00	Tokyo, Japan	Deep Jewels Featherweight (-48 kg) Grand Prix Semifinal
Win	5–0	Emi Tomimatsu	Decision (split)	Deep Jewels 7	February 21, 2015	2	5:00	Tokyo, Japan	Deep Jewels Featherweight (-48 kg) Grand Prix Quarterfinal
Win	4–0	Satomi Takano	Technical Submission (rear-naked choke)	Deep Jewels 6	November 3, 2014	1	4:02	Tokyo, Japan	
Win	3–0	Masako Yoshida	Decision (unanimous)	Deep Jewels 5	August 9, 2014	1	4:02	Tokyo, Japan	
Win	2–0	Tomo Maesawa	Submission (rear-naked choke)	JEWELS: 23rd Ring	March 30, 2013	1	1:49	Tokyo, Japan	
Win	1–0	Naomi Taniyama	Submission (rear-naked choke)	JEWELS: 23rd Ring	December 15, 2012	2	1:55	Tokyo, Japan	Atomweight debut.

== Grappling record ==
1 Win, 1 Loss, 1 Draw, 0 No Contest
Date	Result	Opponent	Event	Location	Method	Round	Time
2017-05-30	Draw	(Japan) Emi Tomimatsu	DEEP JEWELS 16	Tokyo, Japan	Decision (Time limit)	2	5:00
2012-09-22	Win	(Japan) Yuka Hiyama	JEWELS: 21st Ring	Tokyo, Japan	Submission (Sleeper choke)	1	1:17
2012-03-03	Loss	(Japan) Miyoko Kusaka	Jewels: 18th Ring	Tokyo, Japan	Submission (Scissor choke)	2	3:17
Legend: Win Loss Draw/No contest Notes

== See also ==
- List of female mixed martial artists
- List of current mixed martial arts champions
- List of Shooto champions
