= Lacey Schuckman =

American mixed martial artist

- Born: July 16, 1988 (age 38); Denver, Colorado, United States
- Height: 5 ft 2 in (1.57 m)
- Division: Strawweight

Mixed martial arts record
- Total: 22
- Wins: 12
- By knockout: 2
- By submission: 6
- By decision: 4
- Losses: 10
- By knockout: 1
- By submission: 4
- By decision: 5

Other information
- Mixed martial arts record from Sherdog

Lacey Schuckman is an American mixed martial artist who competes in the Strawweight division. She has fought in Invicta FC and Strikeforce.

== Mixed martial arts record ==
Professional record breakdown
22 matches	12 wins	10 losses
By knockout	2	1
By submission	6	4
By decision	4	5

Res.	Record	Opponent	Method	Event	Date	Round	Time	Location	Notes
Win	12–10	Rosa Acevedo	Decision (unanimous)	SCL 62: Unbroken	October 14, 2017	3	5:00	Denver, Colorado, United States	
Loss	11–10	Molly McCann	Decision (split)	Cage Warriors 82: Pimblett vs. Narimani	April 1, 2017	3	5:00	Liverpool, United Kingdom	
Loss	11–9	Mizuki Inoue	Submission (armbar)	Invicta FC 15: Cyborg vs. Ibragimova	January 16, 2016	3	3:41	Costa Mesa, California, United States	
Win	11–8	Jenny Liou	TKO (punches)	Invicta FC 12: Kankaanpää vs. Souza	April 24, 2015	1	1:53	Kansas City, Missouri, United States	
Loss	10–8	Brenda Gonzalez	Decision (unanimous)	Mosley Showdown/Swarm Entertainment: SuperBrawl 1	January 30, 2015	3	5:00	Phoenix, Arizona, United States	
Win	10–7	Melissa Myers	Submission (rear-naked choke)	Fight to Win: Animals	April 18, 2014	1	1:35	Denver, Colorado, United States	
Loss	9–7	Amber Stautzenberger	Decision (unanimous)	XKO 20	November 23, 2013	3	5:00	Arlington, Texas, United States	
Win	9–6	Jody Lynn Reicher	Submission (armbar)	SCL Thunderdome 2	June 8, 2013	1	0:28	Denver, Colorado, United States	
Win	8–6	Darla Harris	Decision (unanimous)	SCL Thunderdome	February 9, 2013	3	5:00	Denver, Colorado, United States	
Loss	7–6	Michelle Waterson	Decision (split)	Invicta FC 3: Penne vs. Sugiyama	October 6, 2012	3	5:00	Kansas City, Kansas, United States	
Loss	7–5	Ayaka Hamasaki	Submission (armbar)	Invicta FC 2: Baszler vs. McMann	July 28, 2012	3	4:45	Kansas City, Kansas, United States	
Win	7–4	Michelle Blalock	Submission (guillotine choke)	ROF 42: Who's Next	December 17, 2011	2	1:02	Broomfield, Colorado, United States	
Loss	6–4	Patricia Vidonic	Submission (rear-naked choke)	The Beatdown 8: Battle of the Badges 2	June 25, 2011	3	4:04	Denver, Colorado, United States	
Win	6–3	Diana Rael	Submission (rear-naked choke)	RMBB Bad Girlz Gone Wild	January 21, 2011	1	4:08	Sheridan, Colorado, United States	
Loss	5–3	Carla Esparza	Submission (rear-naked choke)	NMEF Ladies Night: Clash of the Titans 8	July 16, 2010	2	2:37	Castle Rock, Colorado, United States	
Win	5–2	Alyx Hess	TKO (punches)	Ring Wars	June 26, 2010	2	3:37	Gillette, Wyoming, United States	
Win	4–2	Avery Vilche	Decision (unanimous)	NMEF Annihilation 24: Clash of the Titans 7	March 13, 2010	3	3:00	Greeley, Colorado, United States	
Loss	3–2	Jeri Sitzes	TKO (punches)	Strikeforce Challengers: Kennedy vs. Cummings	September 25, 2009	3	2:18	Tulsa, Oklahoma, United States	
Win	3–1	Jess Taylor	Submission (punches)	Fearless Fighting Championships	April 11, 2009	1	4:43	Superior, Wisconsin, United States	
Win	2–1	Tammie Schneider	Submission (rear-naked choke)	C3 Fights	February 28, 2009	1	1:59	Newkirk, Oklahoma, United States	
Loss	1–1	Lisa Higo	Decision (unanimous)	HOOKnSHOOT GFight 2009 Grand Prix	January 16, 2009	3	3:00	Evansville, Indiana, United States	
Win	1–0	Mariah Reed	Decision (unanimous)	HOOKnSHOOT GFight 2009 Grand Prix	January 16, 2009	3	3:00	Evansville, Indiana, United States	

== See also ==
- List of current Invicta FC fighters
- List of female mixed martial artists
