= Atomweight (MMA) =

MMA weight class

The atomweight division in mixed martial arts generally refers to competitors weighing less than 48 kg (105.8 lb), depending on the promotion. It sits below the heavier strawweight division and is the lightest weight class widely recognized within MMA. The atomweight division in mixed martial arts is used almost exclusively for Women's MMA.

== Ambiguity ==
In general, atomweight refers to competitors weighing less than 48 kg (105.8 lb), but the exact weight differs per promotion. Fight Matrix classifies fighters at 110.9 lbs (50.3 kg) and under as atomweight.

- The Deep Jewels atomweight division has an upper limit of 47.6 kg (105 lbs). It was previously known as featherweight until May 2015.
- The Invicta Fighting Championships atomweight division is between 95 and 105 lbs (43 to 47.6 kg).
- The Pancrase atomweight division has an upper limit of 47.6 kg.
- The ONE Championship atomweight division is between 105 and 115 lbs (47.6 to 52.2 kg).
- The Road Fighting Championship atomweight division has an upper limit of 48 kg.
- The Shooto atomweight division has an upper limit of 47.6 kg.

== History ==
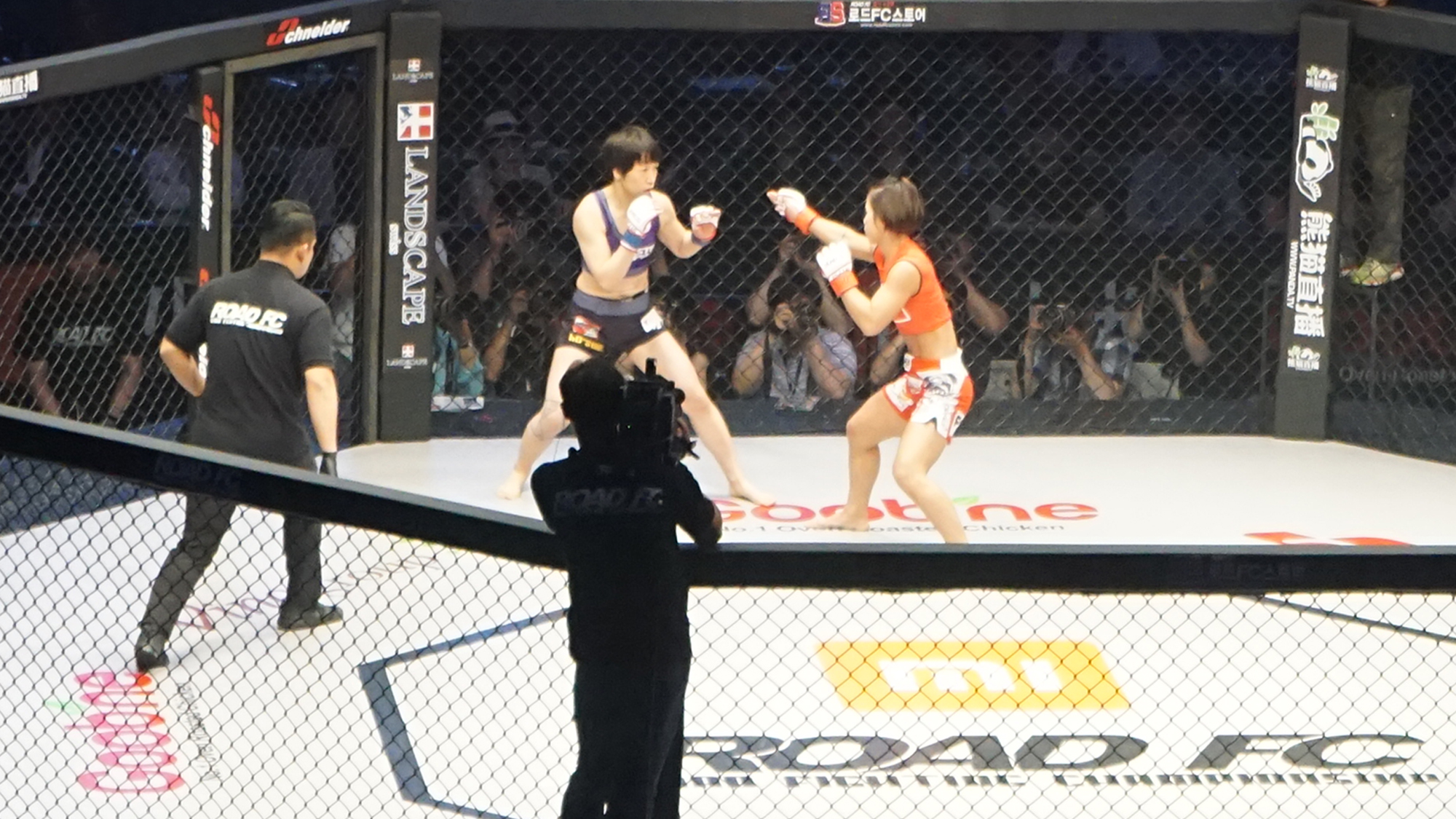
Mina Kurobe vs. Seo Hee Ham for the inaugural Road FC Women's Atomweight Championship, 2017

Deep Jewels regularly holds contests at 47.6 kg and circulates a championship title. A tournament took place that culminated on December 17, 2011 at Jewels 17th Ring, where Naho Sugiyama defeated both Kikuyo Ishikawa and Misaki Takimoto on the same night to win the inaugural championship. Although now titled the atomweight class, the division was previously known as the featherweight class until May 2015.

Invicta held their inaugural atomweight title fight on October 6, 2012. The contest saw Jessica Penne defeating Naho Sugiyama by triangle choke in the second round.

ONE Championship held their inaugural atomweight championship title match on May 6, 2016. The fight saw Angela Lee defeat Mei Yamaguchi.

Road FC introduced an atomweight championship title on June 10, 2017. The match saw Seo Hee Ham defeat Mina Kurobe by TKO in the third round.

Shooto introduced an atomweight championship via a tournament that culminated on November 27, 2022, where Chihiro Sawada defeated Yuki Ono.

Pancrase held a tournament to crown their inaugural atomweight champion. It concluded on March 31, 2024, with Sarami stopping Sayako Fujita in the first round.

== Professional champions ==
=== Current champions ===
Organization	Reign began	Champion	Record	Defenses
Deep Jewels	March 24, 2024	(Japan) Seika Izawa	18–0 (1KO 10SUB)	0
Rizin FF	N/A	Vacant	N/A	N/A
Invicta FC	September 20, 2024	(Brazil) Elisandra Ferreira	8–2 (1KO)	1
ONE Championship	May 2, 2025	(Philippines) Denice Zamboanga	12–2 (3KO 3SUB)	0
Pancrase	March 31, 2024	(Japan) Sarami	19–14 (3KO 6SUB)	0
Road FC	September 4, 2021	(South Korea) Yu Ri Shim	6–3 (2KO 1SUB)	0
Shooto	August 3, 2024	(Japan) Aira Koga	7-3–1 (1KO, 1SUB)	0

== See also ==
- List of current MMA Women's Atomweight Champions
- Mixed martial arts weight classes
