= 2008 in Elite Xtreme Combat =

Information
- First date: January 25, 2008
- Last date: October 10, 2008

Events
- Total events: 12

Fights
- Total fights: 126
- Title fights: 7

Chronology
2007 in Elite XC	2008 in Elite Xtreme Combat

The year 2008 is the 2nd year in the history of the Elite Xtreme Combat, a mixed martial arts promotion based in The United States. In 2008 Elite Xtreme Combat held 12 events beginning with, ShoXC: Elite Challenger Series.

== Title fights ==
Title fights in 2008
Weight class				Method	Round	Time	Event	Notes
Middleweight	Robbie Lawler (c)	vs.	Scott Smith	No Contest	3	3:26	EliteXC: Primetime	(Note: For the EliteXC Middleweight Championship; Lawler inadvertently poked Smith in the eye.)
Lightweight	K. J. Noons (c)	def.	Yves Edwards	KO (punches and elbows)	1	0:48	EliteXC: Return of the King	(Note: For the EliteXC Lightweight Championship)
Middleweight	Robbie Lawler (c)	def.	Scott Smith	TKO (strikes)	2	2:35	EliteXC: Unfinished Business	(Note: For the EliteXC Middleweight Championship)
Welterweight	Jake Shields	def.	Nick Thompson	Submission (guillotine choke)	1	1:03	EliteXC: Unfinished Business	(Note: For the EliteXC Welterweight Championship)
Heavyweight	Antônio Silva	def.	Justin Eilers	TKO (punches)	2	0:19	EliteXC: Unfinished Business	(Note: For the EliteXC Heavyweight Championship)
Bantamweight	Wilson Reis	def.	Abel Cullum	Decision (Unanimous)	5	5:00	ShoXC: Elite Challenger Series	(Note: For the EliteXC Bantamweight Championship)
Welterweight	Jake Shields (c)	def.	Paul Daley	Submission (armbar)	2	3:47	EliteXC: Heat	(Note: For the EliteXC Welterweight Championship)

== Events list ==
#	Event title	Date	Arena	Location
21	EliteXC: Renegade	November 10, 2008	American Bank Center	Corpus Christi, Texas
20	ShoXC: Elite Challenger Series	October 10, 2008	Horseshoe Casino	Hammond, Indiana
19	EliteXC: Heat	October 4, 2008	BankAtlantic Center	Sunrise, Florida
18	ShoXC: Elite Challenger Series	September 26, 2008	Chumash Casino Resort	Santa Ynez, California
17	ShoXC: Hamman vs. Suganuma 2	August 15, 2008	Table Mountain Rancheria	Friant, California
16	EliteXC: Unfinished Business	July 26, 2008	Stockton Arena	Stockton, California
15	EliteXC: Return of the King	June 14, 2008	Neal S. Blaisdell Arena	Oahu, Hawaii
14	EliteXC: Primetime	May 31, 2008	Prudential Center	Newark, New Jersey
13	ShoXC: Elite Challenger Series	April 5, 2008	Table Mountain Rancheria	Friant, California
12	Strikeforce: Shamrock vs. Le	March 29, 2008	HP Pavilion	San Jose, California
11	ShoXC: Elite Challenger Series	March 21, 2008	Chumash Casino Resort	Santa Ynez, California
10	EliteXC: Street Certified	February 16, 2008	BankUnited Center	Miami
9	ShoXC: Elite Challenger Series	January 25, 2008	Trump Taj Mahal	Atlantic City, New Jersey

== ShoXC: Elite Challenger Series ==
ShoXC: Elite Challenger Series
- Date: January 25, 2008
- Venue: Trump Taj Mahal
- City: Atlantic City, New Jersey

ShoXC: Elite Challenger Series was an event held on January 25, 2008 at Trump Taj Mahal in Atlantic City, New Jersey.

=== Results ===
Main card (Showtime)
Weight class				Method	Round	Time	Notes
	Eddie Alvarez	def.	Ross Ebanez	TKO (Punches)	2	2:32
	Paul Daley	def.	Sam Morgan	KO (Elbow)	1	2:12
	Bao Quach	def.	Robert McMasters	Decision (Unanimous)	3	5:00
	Tonya Evinger	def.	Julie Kedzie	Submission (Rear-Naked Choke)	1	1:43
	Kala Hose	def.	Frederic Belleton	KO (Punch)	1	4:32
	Charlie Brenneman	def.	Drew Puzon	Decision (Split)	3	5:00
	Wilson Reis	def.	Zach Makovsky	Submission (Arm-Triangle Choke)	2	1:15
	James Jones	def.	Mark Getto	Submission (Kimura)	1	1:12
	Brett Linebarger	def.	Sergio Vinagre	KO (Punch)	3	2:29
	Matt Makowski	def.	Joe Schilling	Submission (Rear-Naked Choke)	1	4:01

== EliteXC: Street Certified ==
EliteXC: Street Certified was an event held on February 16, 2008 at BankUnited Center in Miami.

=== Results ===
Main card (Showtime)
Weight class				Method	Round	Time	Notes
Heavyweight	Kimbo Slice	def.	Tank Abbott	KO (punch)	1	0:43
Heavyweight	Antônio Silva	def.	Ricco Rodriguez	Decision (split) (28-29, 29-28, 30-27)	3	5:00
Middleweight	Scott Smith	def.	Kyle Noke	KO (punch)	2	0:07
Lightweight	Yves Edwards	def.	James Edson Berto	KO (flying knee)	1	4:56
Heavyweight	Brett Rogers	def.	James Thompson	KO (strikes)	1	2:24
Preliminary card (Proelite.com)
Light Heavyweight	Rafael Cavalcante	def.	John Doyle	TKO (knee)	1	2:17
Middleweight	Yosmany Cabezas	def.	Jon Kirk	Submission (rear-naked choke)	2	0:58
Heavyweight	Dave Herman	def.	Mario Rinaldi	TKO (knees and punches)	3	0:33
Welterweight	Eric Bradley	def.	Mikey Gomez	Decision (unanimous)	3	5:00
Welterweight	Lorenzo Borgomeo	def.	Mike Bernhard	Submission (triangle choke)	2	4:11
Catchweight (210 lbs)	Moyses Gabin	def.	Jirka Hlavati	TKO (punches)	1	2:32

== ShoXC: Elite Challenger Series ==
ShoXC: Elite Challenger Series
- Date: March 21, 2008
- Venue: Chumash Casino Resort
- City: Santa Ynez, California

ShoXC: Elite Challenger Series was an event held on March 21, 2008 at Chumash Casino Resort in Santa Ynez, California.

=== Results ===
Main card (Showtime)
Weight class				Method	Round	Time	Notes
	Thomas Denny	def.	Mongkhon Wiwasuk	DQ (Illegal Strikes)	1	4:51
	Conor Heun	def.	Marlon Matias	Decision (Unanimous)	3	5:00
	Jaime Fletcher	def.	Aaron Rosa	Decision (Unanimous)	3	5:00
	Shane del Rosario	def.	Analu Brash	TKO (Punches)	1	3:18
	Mark Oshiro	def.	Chris Cariaso	TKO (Punches)	1	2:38
	Brandon Tarns	def.	Jason Williams	Submission (Rear-Naked Choke)	2	1:05
	Devin Howard	def.	Mark Kempthorne	Submission (Rear-Naked Choke)	1	2:53
	Lyle Beerbohm	def.	Vince Guzman	Submission (Rear-Naked Choke)	2	3:26
	Kenny Johnson	def.	Mike Penafiel	Decision (Unanimous)	3	5:00
	Steve Gable	def.	Eric Jones	TKO (Punches)	1	2:47

== Strikeforce: Shamrock vs. Le ==
Strikeforce: Shamrock vs. Le was an event held on March 29, 2008 at The HP Pavilion in San Jose, California.

=== Results ===
Main card
Weight class				Method	Round	Time	Notes
Middleweight	Cung Le	def.	Frank Shamrock (c)	TKO (stoppage)	3	5:00	(Note: For the Middleweight Championship.)
Lightweight	Gilbert Melendez (c)	def.	Gabe Lemley	TKO (punches)	2	2:18	(Note: For the Lightweight Championship.)
Heavyweight	Wayne Cole	def.	Mike Kyle	Submission (armbar)	1	0:45
Middleweight	Joey Villasenor	def.	Ryan Jensen	KO (punch)	1	4:45
Preliminary card
Catchweight (162 lb)	Billy Evangelista	def.	Marlon Sims	KO (punch)	3	0:39
Welterweight	Drew Fickett	def.	Jae Suk Lim	Submission (guillotine choke)	1	1:14
Welterweight	Tiki Ghosn	def.	Luke Stewart	Decision (unanimous) (29-28, 29-28, 30-27)	3	5:00
Bantamweight	Darren Uyenoyama	def.	Anthony Figueroa	Submission (guillotine choke)	1	1:27
Catchweight (180 lb)	Jesse Jones	def.	Jesse Gillespie	TKO (punches)	1	0:35

== ShoXC: Elite Challenger Series ==
ShoXC: Elite Challenger Series
- Date: April 5, 2008
- Venue: Table Mountain Rancheria
- City: Friant, California

ShoXC: Elite Challenger Series was an event held on April 5, 2008 at The Table Mountain Rancheria in Friant, California.

=== Results ===
Main card (Showtime)
Weight class				Method	Round	Time	Notes
	Poai Suganuma	def.	Jared Hamman	KO (Flying Knee)	1	0:15
	Fabricio Camões	def.	Joe Camacho	TKO (Punches)	1	3:20
	Shayna Baszler	def.	Keiko Tamai	Submission (Twister)	1	2:05
	Giva Santana	def.	Matt Lucas	Submission (Armbar)	1	1:49
	Bao Quach	def.	Douglas Evans	TKO (Punches)	1	0:55
	Tony Lopez	def.	Terroll Dees	TKO (Punches)	2	1:09
	Brent Cooper	def.	Jaime Iracheta	TKO (Punches)	1	1:30
	Luke Riddering	def.	Yasser Pezzat	TKO (Punches)	1	2:53
	Lucas Gamaza	def.	Devin Howard	Decision (Unanimous)	3	5:00
	Roberto Vargas	def.	Telly Sanders	Submission (Shoulder Lock)	3	1:53
	Melanie Lacroix	def.	Melissa Vasquez	KO (Punch)	1	2:58

== EliteXC: Primetime ==
EliteXC: Primetime was an event held on May 31, 2008 at The Prudential Center in Newark, New Jersey.

=== Results ===
Main card (CBS)
Weight class				Method	Round	Time	Notes
Heavyweight	Kimbo Slice	def.	James Thompson	TKO (punches)	3	0:38
Middleweight	Robbie Lawler (c)	vs.	Scott Smith	No Contest	3	3:26	(Note: For the Middleweight Championship; Lawler inadvertently poked Smith in the eye.)
Catchweight (144 lbs)	Gina Carano	def.	Kaitlin Young	TKO (doctor stoppage)	2	3:00	(Note: The ringside physician stopped the bout between rounds 2 and 3.)
Middleweight	Joey Villasenor	def.	Phil Baroni	TKO (punches)	1	1:11
Heavyweight	Brett Rogers	def.	Jon Murphy	KO (punch)	1	1:01
Preliminary card
Lightweight	Chris Liguori	def.	Jim Bova	TKO (cut)	2	4:31
Heavyweight	Carlton Haselrig	def.	Carlos Moreno	TKO (corner stoppage)	1	5:00	(Note: Moreno's corner stopped the bout between rounds 2 and 3.)
Lightweight	Matt Makowski	def.	Nick Serra	TKO	2	3:57	(Note: Serra refused to get up from the ground, resulting in the referee ending the fight.)
Bantamweight	Wilson Reis	def.	Justin Robbins	Submission (rear-naked choke)	1	4:06
Bantamweight	James Jones	def.	Calvin Kattar	Submission (rear-naked choke)	1	4:49
Bantamweight	Zach Makovsky	def.	André Soares	Decision (unanimous) (29–28, 29–26, 29–26)	3	5:00
Bantamweight	Joe Sampieri	def.	Mike Groves	TKO (punches)	1	4:58

== EliteXC: Return of the King ==
EliteXC: Return of the King was an event held on June 14, 2008 at Neal S. Blaisdell Arena in Oahu, Hawaii.

=== Results ===
Main card (Showtime)
Weight class				Method	Round	Time	Notes
Lightweight	K. J. Noons (c)	def.	Yves Edwards	KO (punches and elbows)	1	0:48	(Note: For the EliteXC Lightweight Championship)
Catchweight (169 lbs)	Nick Diaz	def.	Muhsin Corbbrey	TKO (punches)	3	3:59
Middleweight	Murilo Rua	def.	Tony Bonello	KO (punches)	1	3:15
Heavyweight	Dave Herman	def.	Ron Waterman	TKO (punches)	1	2:19
Light Heavyweight	Rafael Cavalcante	def.	Wayne Cole	TKO (punches)	1	2:47
Preliminary card (Proelite.com)
Middleweight	Bubba McDaniel	def.	Kala Hose	Submission (rear-naked choke)	1	0:41
Bantamweight	Mark Oshiro	def.	Chris Willems	Submission (triangle choke)	1	2:12
Lightweight	Mike Aina	def.	Kaleo Kwan	Decision (unanimous)	3	5:00
Lightweight	P.J. Dean	vs.	Dean Lista	Draw	3	5:00
Catchweight (135 lbs)	Russell Doane	def.	Dwayne Haney	TKO (punches and elbows)	1	2:54
Middleweight	Carl Barton	def.	Kepa Madeiros	TKO (punches)	1	0:55

== EliteXC: Unfinished Business ==
EliteXC: Unfinished Business was an event held on July 26, 2008 at Stockton Arena in Stockton, California.

=== Results ===
Main card (CBS)
Weight class				Method	Round	Time	Notes
Middleweight	Robbie Lawler (c)	def.	Scott Smith	TKO (strikes)	2	2:35	(Note: For the EliteXC Middleweight Championship)
Lightweight	Nick Diaz	def.	Thomas Denny	KO (punches)	2	0:30
Welterweight	Jake Shields	def.	Nick Thompson	Submission (guillotine choke)	1	1:03	(Note: For the EliteXC Welterweight Championship)
Women's Bantamweight	Cristiane Santos	def.	Shayna Baszler	TKO (strikes)	2	2:48
Preliminary card (Showtime)
Heavyweight	Antônio Silva	def.	Justin Eilers	TKO (punches)	2	0:19	(Note: For the EliteXC Heavyweight Championship)
Light Heavyweight	Rafael Cavalcante	vs.	Travis Galbraith	TKO (punches)	1	3:00
Bantamweight	Wilson Reis	def.	Bryan Caraway	Decision (unanimous) (30-27, 30-27, 30-27)	3	5:00
Preliminary card (Unaired)
Lightweight	David Douglas	def.	Marlon Mathias	KO (punches)	1	0:12	(Note: Swing bout that occurred after the main event finished.)
Light Heavyweight	Anthony Ruiz	def.	Jeromy Freitag	Decision (unanimous) (29–28, 29–28, 29–28)	3	5:00
Heavyweight	Carl Seumanutafa	def.	Mike Cook	KO (slam)	1	1:21
Heavyweight	Drew Montgomery	def.	Brandon Tarn	TKO (cut)	3	4:22

== ShoXC: Hamman vs. Suganuma 2 ==
ShoXC: Hamman vs. Suganuma 2
- Date: August 15, 2008
- Venue: Table Mountain Rancheria
- City: Friant, California

ShoXC: Hamman vs. Suganuma 2 was an event held on August 15, 2008 at The Table Mountain Rancheria in Friant, California.

=== Results ===
Main card (Showtime)
Weight class				Method	Round	Time	Notes
	Jared Hamman	def.	Poai Suganuma	TKO (Punches)	1	2:34
	Fabricio Camões	def.	Sam Morgan	Submission (Rear-Naked Choke)	1	0:47
	Cyrille Diabate	def.	Jaime Fletcher	Decision (Unanimous)	3	5:00
	Rosi Sexton	def.	Debi Purcell	Decision (Split)	3	3:00
	Ray Lizama	def.	Keith Berry	TKO (Punches to the Body)	2	2:15
	Katrine Alendal	def.	Melanie Lacroix	Decision (Unanimous)	3	3:00
	Roberto Vargas	def.	Ralph Lopez	Decision (Split)	3	5:00
	Jesse Brock	def.	Josh Rave	Decision (Unanimous)	3	5:00
	Lucas Gamaza	def.	Kenny Johnson	Decision (Split)	3	5:00
	David Douglas	def.	William Jacobson	TKO (Corner Stoppage)	1	1:12

== ShoXC: Elite Challenger Series ==
ShoXC: Elite Challenger Series
- Date: September 26, 2008
- Venue: Chumash Casino Resort
- City: Santa Ynez, California

ShoXC: Elite Challenger Series was an event held on September 26, 2008 at Chumash Casino Resort in Santa Ynez, California.

=== Results ===
Main card (Showtime)
Weight class				Method	Round	Time	Notes
Bantamweight	Wilson Reis	def.	Abel Cullum	Decision (Unanimous)	5	5:00	(Note: For the EliteXC Bantamweight Championship)
	Shane del Rosario	def.	Carl Seumanutafa	TKO (Punches)	2	1:07
	David Douglas	def.	Mongkhon Wiwasuk	TKO (Punches)	3	2:51
	Jaime Jara	def.	Giva Santana	Decision (Split)	3	5:00
	Erik Apple	def.	Matt Makowski	Submission (Rear-Naked Choke)	2	2:04
	Scott Lighty	def.	Jamiah Williamson	TKO (Punches)	1	4:51
	Damion Douglas	def.	Joe Schilling	Submission (Rear-Naked Choke)	1	0:46
	Fernando Bettega	def.	Manuel Otero	Submission (Rear-Naked Choke)	1	2:27
	Luke Riddering	def.	John Corstorphine	TKO (Punches)	1	3:44
	Steve Gable	def.	Josh McDonald	Decision (Split)	3	5:00

== EliteXC: Heat ==
EliteXC: Heat was an event held on October 4, 2008 at The BankAtlantic Center in Sunrise, Florida.

=== Results ===
Main card (CBS)
Weight class				Method	Round	Time	Notes
Heavyweight	Seth Petruzelli	def.	Kimbo Slice	KO (punches)	1	0:14
Welterweight	Jake Shields (c)	def.	Paul Daley	Submission (armbar)	2	3:47	(Note: For the EliteXC Welterweight Championship)
Heavyweight	Andrei Arlovski	def.	Roy Nelson	KO (punch)	2	3:14
Women's Bantamweight	Gina Carano	def.	Kelly Kobold	Decision (unanimous) (30–27, 30–27, 29–28)	3	5:00
Middleweight	Benji Radach	def.	Murilo Rua	KO (punch)	2	2:31
Preliminary card (Unaired)
Women's Bantamweight	Cristiane Santos	def.	Yoko Takahashi	Decision (unanimous) (30–26, 30–27, 30–27)	3	5:00
Lightweight	Conor Heun	def.	James Edson Berto	TKO (strikes)	2	2:18
Welterweight	Mikey Gomez	def.	Lorenzo Borgomeo	Submission (armbar)	2	4:06
Bantamweight	Bryan Hamade	def.	David Gomez	Submission (guillotine choke)	1	2:03
Lightweight	Nicolae Cury	def.	Jorge Bouchat	Submission (triangle choke)	1	1:35

== ShoXC: Elite Challenger Series ==
ShoXC: Elite Challenger Series
- Date: October 10, 2008
- Venue: The Horseshoe Casino
- City: Hammond, Indiana

ShoXC: Elite Challenger Series was an event held on October 10, 2008 at The Horseshoe Casino in Hammond, Indiana.

=== Results ===
Main card (Showtime)
Weight class				Method	Round	Time	Notes
	Dave Herman	def.	Kerry Schall	TKO (Knees and Punches)	1	1:06
	Mamed Khalidov	def.	Jason Guida	TKO (Punches)	2	4:53
	Anthony Lapsley	def.	Mike Stumpf	Decision (Majority)	3	5:00
	Alexander Shlemenko	def.	Bubba McDaniel	TKO (Flying Knee to the Body)	1	5:00
	Lyle Beerbohm	def.	Rafaello Oliveira	TKO (Doctor Stoppage)	1	5:00
	Matt Jaggers	def.	Orville Smith	Decision (Unanimous)	3	5:00
	Jared McMahan	def.	Jacob Hey	Submission (Rear Naked Choke)	1	3:11
	Jeff Cox	def.	Jay Ellis	Submission (Guillotine Choke)	1	0:28
	Tiawan Howard	def.	Johnny Hughes	Submission (Rear Naked Choke)	1	3:42
	Josh Barnes	def.	Jeremy Norton	TKO (Punches)	1	2:22
	Deray Davis	def.	John Kuhner	Submission (Rear Naked Choke)	2	3:53

== See also ==
- Elite Xtreme Combat
