= Jared Hamman =

American mixed martial arts fighter

- Born: March 7, 1982 (age 44); Atascadero, California, United States
- Other names: The Messenger
- Height: 6 ft 3 in (1.91 m)
- Weight: 205 lb (93 kg; 14 st 9 lb)
- Division: Middleweight; Light Heavyweight
- Reach: 75.0 in (191 cm)
- Stance: Orthodox
- Fighting out of: El Segundo, California, United States
- Team: VMAT
- Trainer: Vladimir Matyushenko; Henry Akins; Antoni Hardonk
- Years active: 2006–present

Mixed martial arts record
- Total: 20
- Wins: 14
- By knockout: 11
- By submission: 2
- By decision: 1
- Losses: 6
- By knockout: 4
- By submission: 1
- By decision: 1

Other information
- Mixed martial arts record from Sherdog

Jared Hamman (born March 7, 1982) is an American mixed martial artist that competes in the World Series of Fighting's Middleweight division. A professional competitor since 2006, he has also formerly competed for the UFC, Strikeforce and ShoXC.

== Background ==
Hamman is originally from Atascadero, California, and was raised by his single mother along with his older brother, Loren. Hamman, who was expelled from a private school, later attended Atascadero High School where he was a standout athlete in football, swimming, track and field, and also competed in wrestling for one year. Hamman continued with football as a defensive end for the University of Redlands, winning All-Conference honors. He also worked as a teacher and an assistant coach before pursuing mixed martial arts.

== Mixed martial arts career ==
=== Early career ===
Hamman began training in mixed martial arts when he was 22 years old at the Unbreakable Gym under Brian Warren in November 2005 and made his professional debut in 2006. He began training with Henry Akins, Antoni Hardonk, and Vladimir Matyushenko of Dynamix MMA in 2010. Hamman received national attention while fighting for the now-defunct EliteXC under their ShoXC banner on the cable network Showtime, most notably for a two-fight series against Po'ai Suganuma.

=== Ultimate Fighting Championship ===
Hamman made his UFC debut against Alexander Gustafsson on November 14, 2009, at UFC 105. Hamman lost via first-round KO.

After that, Hamman faced Rodney Wallace on March 27, 2010, at UFC 111. He won the fight via unanimous decision and both fighters were awarded Fight of the Night honors.

Hamman was defeated by Kyle Kingsbury via unanimous decision on September 15, 2010, at UFC Fight Night 22. However, Hamman was awarded his second Fight of the Night honors.

For his next fight, Hamman dropped to Middleweight and faced CB Dollaway at UFC on Versus 5. He was successful in his middleweight debut, winning via TKO at 3:38 of round 2.

Hamman faced Costas Philippou on December 10, 2011, at UFC 140. He lost via KO in the 1st round.

Hamman was expected to face Kyle Noke on March 3, 2012, at UFC on FX 2. However, he withdrew from the fight due to an undisclosed injury, and was replaced by UFC newcomer Andrew Craig.

Hamman next faced Michael Kuiper on August 11, 2012, at UFC 150. Hamman lost via TKO in the second round.

After over a year out, Hamman faced Magnus Cedenblad on August 31, 2013, at UFC 164. He lost the fight via guillotine choke submission in the first round. After the loss, Hamman was released from the UFC.

=== World Series of Fighting ===
After over a year away from the sport, Hamman signed with the World Series of Fighting. He debuted for the company on October 11, 2014, in Edmonton, Alberta, Canada against former The Ultimate Fighter Nations competitor Luke Harris. Hamman won the fight via TKO in the first round.

== Championships and accomplishments ==
- Ultimate Fighting Championship
  - Fight of the Night (Two times) vs. Rodney Wallace, Kyle Kingsbury

== Mixed martial arts record ==
Professional record breakdown
20 matches	14 wins	6 losses
By knockout	11	4
By submission	2	1
By decision	1	1

Res.	Record	Opponent	Method	Event	Date	Round	Time	Location	Notes
Win	14–6	Luke Harris	TKO (punches)	WSOF 14	October 11, 2014	1	2:27	Edmonton, Alberta, Canada	Returned to Light Heavyweight.
Loss	13–6	Magnus Cedenblad	Technical Submission (guillotine choke)	UFC 164	August 31, 2013	1	0:57	Milwaukee, Wisconsin, United States	
Loss	13–5	Michael Kuiper	TKO (punches)	UFC 150	August 11, 2012	2	2:16	Denver, Colorado, United States	
Loss	13–4	Costas Philippou	KO (punches)	UFC 140	December 10, 2011	1	3:11	Toronto, Ontario, Canada	
Win	13–3	CB Dollaway	TKO (punches)	UFC Live: Hardy vs. Lytle	August 14, 2011	2	3:38	Milwaukee, Wisconsin, United States	Middleweight debut.
Loss	12–3	Kyle Kingsbury	Decision (unanimous)	UFC Fight Night: Marquardt vs. Palhares	September 15, 2010	3	5:00	Austin, Texas, United States	Fight of the Night.
Win	12–2	Rodney Wallace	Decision (unanimous)	UFC 111	March 27, 2010	3	5:00	Newark, New Jersey, United States	Fight of the Night.
Loss	11–2	Alexander Gustafsson	KO (punches)	UFC 105	November 14, 2009	1	0:41	Manchester, England	
Win	11–1	Po'ai Suganuma	TKO (punches)	ShoXC: Hamman vs. Suganuma 2	August 15, 2008	1	2:34	Friant, California, United States	
Win	10–1	Ibrahim Ibrahim	TKO (punches)	California Cage Championships	June 9, 2008	1	2:00	Maywood, California, United States	
Loss	9–1	Po'ai Suganuma	KO (flying knee)	ShoXC: Elite Challenger Series	April 5, 2008	1	0:15	Friant, California, United States	
Win	9–0	Aaron Rosa	Submission (rear-naked choke)	ShoXC: Elite Challenger Series	October 26, 2007	2	1:46	Santa Ynez, California, United States	
Win	8–0	Travis Wiuff	KO (punches)	IFC: Global Domination 2	July 14, 2007	2	N/A	Marksville, Louisiana, United States	
Win	7–0	Rogent Lloret	KO (punches)	IFC: Global Domination 2	July 14, 2007	2	N/A	Marksville, Louisiana, United States	
Win	6–0	Paul Mince	TKO (punches)	Chaos in the Cage 2	April 6, 2007	2	0:20	San Bernardino, California, United States	
Win	5–0	Rafael Real	Submission (armbar)	Beatdown in Bakersfield	November 17, 2006	1	1:41	Bakersfield, California, United States	
Win	4–0	Ricardo Arrivabeive	TKO (punches)	Pangea Fights 2: Live MMA	August 18, 2006	2	2:14	Hollywood, California, United States	
Win	3–0	Randal Limond	TKO (punches)	California Xtreme Fighting 2	July 15, 2006	1	0:36	Upland, California, United States	
Win	2–0	Scott Graham	TKO (punches)	Strikeforce: Revenge	June 9, 2006	2	1:36	San Jose, California, United States	
Win	1–0	Ray Lizama	TKO (cut)	California Xtreme Fighting 1	April 29, 2006	2	N/A	Upland, California, United States	
