= Elite Xtreme Combat =

MMA promoter based in the U.S.

- Company type: Public
- Traded as: OTC Pink: PELE
- Founded: November 13, 2006; 19 years ago
- Founder: Showtime Networks, ProElite
- Defunct: October 20, 2008; 17 years ago
- Fate: Folded
- Headquarters: Los Angeles, United States
- Key people: William Kelly President & Chief Operating Officer, Chairman, Paul Feller, Glenn Golenberg, Douglas De Luca, Lloyd Bryan Molander
- Parent: ProElite

Elite Xtreme Combat, also known as EliteXC, was a United States–based mixed martial arts (MMA) organization owned and operated by ProElite. It was founded as a partnership between Showtime Networks and ProElite and officially announced on December 14, 2006. It was headquartered in Los Angeles.

The partnership to form EliteXC was announced on November 13, 2006. The first major event occurred February 10, 2007, at the DeSoto Civic Center in Southaven, Mississippi. Fighters Frank Shamrock and Renzo Gracie fought in the main event. Also debuting on this card was Charles Bennett, K. J. Noons, Mike Pyle and Antônio Silva.

In early 2008, EliteXC had reached an agreement with CBS to broadcast EliteXC shows on prime time. The arrangement was that CBS would broadcast EliteXC specials every other month on Saturday nights. CBS aired only three events in 2008, on May 31, July 26, and October 4.

== EliteXC events ==
This is a list of events held and scheduled by Elite Xtreme Combat (EliteXC), a mixed martial arts organization based in the United States. The first event took place in February 2007. The list includes three events that EliteXC co-promoted (Dynamite!! USA, Strikeforce Shamrock vs. Baroni, and Strikeforce: Shamrock vs. Le) with other MMA organizations. Two events were shown initially on pay-per-view, while the others aired on the Showtime cable network or on CBS.

#	Event Title	Date	Arena	Location
20	ShoXC: Elite Challenger Series	October 10, 2008	Horseshoe Casino	Hammond, Indiana
19	EliteXC: Heat	October 4, 2008	BankAtlantic Center	Sunrise, Florida
18	ShoXC: Elite Challenger Series	September 26, 2008	Chumash Casino Resort	Santa Ynez, California
17	ShoXC: Hamman vs. Suganuma 2	August 15, 2008	Table Mountain Rancheria	Friant, California
16	EliteXC: Unfinished Business	July 26, 2008	Stockton Arena	Stockton, California
15	EliteXC: Return of the King	June 14, 2008	Neal S. Blaisdell Arena	Oahu, Hawaii
14	EliteXC: Primetime	May 31, 2008	Prudential Center	Newark, New Jersey
13	ShoXC: Elite Challenger Series	April 5, 2008	Table Mountain Rancheria	Friant, California
12	Strikeforce: Shamrock vs. Le	March 29, 2008	HP Pavilion	San Jose, California
11	ShoXC: Elite Challenger Series	March 21, 2008	Chumash Casino Resort	Santa Ynez, California
10	EliteXC: Street Certified	February 16, 2008	BankUnited Center	Miami
9	ShoXC: Elite Challenger Series	January 25, 2008	Trump Taj Mahal	Atlantic City, New Jersey
8	EliteXC: Renegade	November 10, 2007	American Bank Center	Corpus Christi, Texas
7	ShoXC: Elite Challenger Series	October 26, 2007	Chumash Casino Resort	Santa Ynez, California
6	EliteXC: Uprising	September 15, 2007	Neal S. Blaisdell Arena	Oahu, Hawaii
5	ShoXC: Elite Challenger Series	August 25, 2007	Vicksburg Convention Center	Vicksburg, Mississippi
4	ShoXC: Elite Challenger Series	July 27, 2007	Chumash Casino Resort	Santa Ynez, California
3	Strikeforce: Shamrock vs. Baroni	June 22, 2007	HP Pavilion	San Jose, California
2	Dynamite!! USA	June 2, 2007	Los Angeles Memorial Coliseum	Los Angeles
1	EliteXC: Destiny	February 10, 2007	DeSoto Civic Center	Southaven, Mississippi

== ShoXC ==
On July 11, 2007, it was announced that Proelite.com and Showtime would produce a new series titled ShoXC. The monthly shows featured up-and-coming MMA talent, similar to Showtime's ShoBox boxing events. The first took place on July 27, 2007. The first event was co-promoted with King of the Cage and was also known as KOTC: Undisputed.

== Partnership with Cage Rage ==
On September 7, 2007, ProElite, Inc. announced that they had officially acquired British MMA organization Cage Rage Championships. EliteXC and Cage Rage Championships planned numerous joint ventures together, beginning with Cage Rage 23.

== Partnership with DREAM ==
On May 10, 2008, EliteXC announced a working partnership with Japanese promotion Dream. The two groups intended to share fighters (Eddie Alvarez, Jason Miller and Nick Diaz have already participated in Dream events) and eventually co-promote shows.

== Co-promoting with Affliction ==
On September 24, 2008, EliteXC announced a working partnership with rival US promotion Affliction. Affliction offered Andrei Arlovski vs. Roy Nelson for the EliteXC: Heat card on CBS. In addition, Affliction heavily promoted their line through commercials on the show. It was hoped that the two companies would survive a rocky financial situation long enough to co-promote fights again in the future.

== Controversy and closing of EliteXC ==
On October 4, 2008, at EliteXC: Heat, EliteXC's biggest ratings draw Kimbo Slice was knocked out by Seth Petruzelli in just 14 seconds. Petruzelli served as a last-minute replacement for MMA pioneer Ken Shamrock, who got injured on the day of the fight and was unable to compete. The unexpected outcome of this fight drew a great deal of attention, and subsequent comments by Petruzelli that he was offered a monetary bonus to employ certain techniques during the fight (comments he later recanted and obfuscated), raised the question of undue influence by EliteXC representatives in fights. Significant debt incurred by parent company Pro Elite with no investors or buyers showing interest caused the subsequent cancellation of the November 8, 2008, event. Combined with the Florida State Athletic Commission launching an investigation into the Slice/Petruzelli fight, Pro Elite announced on October 20, 2008, that they would cease operations.

== Weight classes ==
Weight class name	Upper limit
Bantamweight	140 lb (63.5 kg)
Featherweight	150 lb (68.0 kg)
Lightweight	160 lb (72.6 kg)
Welterweight	170 lb (77.1 kg)
Middleweight	190 lb (86.2 kg)
Light Heavyweight	210 lb (95.3 kg)
Heavyweight	No weight limit

== EliteXC champions ==
=== Heavyweight Championship ===
Weight limit: Unlimited

No.	Name	Event	Date	Defenses
1	(Brazil) Antônio Silva def. Justin Eilers	EliteXC: Unfinished Business; Stockton, California, US	July 26, 2008	

=== Middleweight Championship ===
Weight limit: 190 lb (86.2 kg; 13.6 st)

No.	Name	Event	Date	Defenses
1	(Brazil) Murilo Rua def. Joey Villasenor	Strikeforce: Shamrock vs. Baroni; San Jose, California, US	June 22, 2007	
2	(United States) Robbie Lawler	EliteXC: Uprising; Honolulu, Hawaii, US	September 15, 2007	NC vs. Scott Smith at EliteXC: Primetime on May 31, 2008 in Newark, New Jersey, US; 1. def. Scott Smith at EliteXC: Unfinished Business on Jul 26, 2008 in Stockton, California, US

=== Welterweight Championship ===
Weight limit: 170 lb (77.1 kg; 12.1 st)

No.	Name	Event	Date	Defenses
1	(United States) Jake Shields def. Nick Thompson	EliteXC: Unfinished Business; Stockton, California, US	July 26, 2008	1. def. Paul Daley at EliteXC: Heat on Oct 4, 2008 in Sunrise, Florida, US

=== Lightweight Championship ===
Weight limit: 160 lb (72.6 kg; 11.4 st)

No.	Name	Event	Date	Defenses
1	(United States) K. J. Noons def. Nick Diaz	EliteXC: Renegade; Corpus Christi, Texas, US	November 10, 2007	1. def. Yves Edwards at EliteXC: Return of the King on Jun 14, 2008 in Honolulu, Hawaii, US
Noons was stripped of the title on September 19, 2008 by EliteXC

=== Bantamweight Championship ===
Weight limit: 140 lb (63.5 kg; 10.0 st)

No.	Name	Event	Date	Defenses
1	(Brazil) Wilson Reis def. Abel Cullum	ShoXC 8 Santa Ynez, California, US	September 26, 2008	

== Women's division ==
- Shayna Baszler
- Gina Carano
- Marloes Coenen
- Tonya Evinger
- Takayo Hashi
- Sarah Kaufman
- Debi Purcell
- Cris Cyborg
- Kaitlin Young

== See also ==
- Mixed Martial Arts
- List of current mixed martial arts champions
- List of Bellator MMA champions
- List of Invicta FC champions
- List of ONE Championship champions
- List of Pride champions
- List of PFL champions
- List of Strikeforce champions
- List of UFC champions
- List of WEC champions
- Mixed martial arts weight classes
