= ShoXC =

Elite Xtreme Combat MMA event in 2007

- Genre: Sports
- Created by: EliteXC; Showtime; Proelite.com
- Country of origin: United States

Production
- Running time: 120 minutes

Original release
- Network: Showtime
- Release: July 27, 2007 – October 10, 2008

ShoXC is a mixed martial arts series produced by the mixed martial arts organization EliteXC, Showtime and Proelite.com. The series was announced on July 11, 2007. The purpose of the show is to highlight up and coming MMA fighters.

On October 20, 2008, ProElite, the parent company of EliteXC, informed its employees and fighters that they were shutting down. The company filed for bankruptcy protection and all future events were canceled. A breakdown in the negotiations with Showtime Networks to purchase ProElite resulted in the company's funding to disappear, forcing them out of business. ShoXC events were later replaced on Showtime by ShoMMA events put on by Strikeforce, after purchasing EliteXC's assets.

== ShoXC 1 ==
ShoXC 1: Noons vs. Berto
- Date: July 27, 2007
- Venue: Chumash Casino Resort
- City: Santa Ynez, California, United States

Event chronology
EliteXC: Destiny	ShoXC 1: Noons vs. Berto	ShoXC 2: Bennett vs. Valenzuela

The inaugural event took place on July 27, 2007 at the Chumash Casino in Santa Ynez, California and aired on the Showtime cable network. In a unique twist, the traditional "preliminary" matches were fought after the main televised bouts. These matches were streamed live via the ProElite website.

Televised bouts
Weight class				Method	Round	Time	Notes
	K. J. Noons	def.	James Edson Berto	KO (knee)	3	0:45
	Jaime Jara	def.	Jeremiah Metcalf	KO (punch)	1	4:15
	Scott Jorgensen	def.	Chris David	Unanimous decision	3	5:00
	Aaron Rosa	def.	Jefferson Silva	TKO (doctor stoppage)	1	5:00
	Muhsin Corbbrey	def.	Lee Gibson	Unanimous decision	3	5:00
Preliminary bouts
	Brian Cobb	def.	John Reedy	Submission (rear naked choke)	1	4:09
	Tony Rubalcava	def.	Drew Montgomery	TKO (strikes)	1	4:19
	Anthony Ruiz	def.	Jason Gersis	TKO (doctor stoppage)	1	5:00
	Josh Neal	def.	Eric Beondo	TKO (knee)	1	2:56
	Shayna Baszler	def.	Jan Finney	Submission (armbar)	1	2:40

== ShoXC 2 ==
ShoXC 2: Bennett vs. Valenzuela
- Date: August 25, 2007
- Venue: Vicksburg Convention Center
- City: Vicksburg, Mississippi United States

Event chronology
ShoXC 1: Noons vs. Berto	ShoXC 2: Bennett vs. Valenzuela	EliteXC: Uprising

During the July 27th streaming event, it was announced the next ShoXC card would take place on Showtime on Saturday, August 25, 2007, putting the EliteXC event head-to-head with UFC 74. The event took place in Vicksburg, Mississippi. The main event was the rematch between Charles Bennett and Victor Valenzuela, which was originally scheduled for Strikeforce Shamrock vs. Baroni.

Televised bouts
Weight class				Method	Round	Time	Notes
	Victor Valenzuela	def.	Charles Bennett	TKO (Submission to strikes)	1	3:23
	Seth Kleinbeck	def.	Jaime Jara	KO (strikes)	2	4:59
	Chris Smith	def.	David Huckaba	KO (strikes)	2	0:19
	Hector Urbina	def.	Ray Lizama	Unanimous decision	3	5:00
	Umar Luv	def.	Brendan Tierney	Submission (rear naked choke)	1	4:08

== ShoXC 3 ==
On the August 25th broadcast, it was announced that the next edition of ShoXC would take place on October 26, 2007 on Showtime at the Chumash Casino in Santa Ynez, California.

Televised bouts
Weight class				Method	Round	Time	Notes
	Jared Hamman	def.	Aaron Rosa	Submission (rear naked choke)	2	1:46
	Javier Vazquez	def.	JC Pennington	Submission (rear naked choke)	1	1:15
	Malaipet Sasiprapa	def.	Kaleo Kwan	Unanimous decision	3	5:00
	Shayna Baszler	def.	Jennifer Tate	Submission (armbar)	1	0:44
	Muhsin Corbbrey	def.	Bobby McMasters	Submission (guillotine)	1	4:59
Preliminary bouts
	Shane Del Rosario	def.	Amedeo Viola	Submission (triangle choke)	1	2:27
	Givanildo Santana	def.	Jaime Fletcher	Submission (armbar)	1	2:46
	Chris Cariaso	def.	Richard McCorkel	Decision (unanimous)	3	5:00

== ShoXC 4 ==
The fourth edition of ShoXC took place on January 25, 2008 at the Trump Taj Mahal in Atlantic City, New Jersey.

Televised bouts
Weight class				Method	Round	Time	Notes
	Eddie Alvarez	def.	Ross Ebanez	KO (punch)	2	2:32
	Paul Daley	def.	Sammy Morgan	KO (elbow strike)	1	2:10
	Bao Quach	def.	Bobby McMaster	Unanimous decision	3	5:00
	Tonya Evinger	def.	Julie Kedzie	Submission (rear naked choke)	1	1:43
	Kala Hose	def.	Frederic Belleton	KO (punch)	1	4:32
Preliminary bouts
	Charlie Brenneman	def.	Drew Puzon	Decision (split)	3	5:00
	Wilson Reis	def.	Zach Makovsky	Submission (side choke)	2	1:15
	James “Binky” Jones	def.	Mark Getto	Submission (kimura)	1	1:12
	Brett Linebarger	def.	Sergio Vignare	TKO (punch)	3	2:29
	Matt Makowski	def.	Joe Schilling	Submission (rear naked choke)	1	4:01

== ShoXC 5 ==
On the January 25th ShoXC, it was announced the next event would take place on March 21, 2008 in California.

Televised bouts
Weight class				Method	Round	Time	Notes
	Thomas Denny	def.	Malaipet	DQ (illegal strikes)	1	4:51
	Conor Heun	def.	Marlon Mathias	Unanimous decision	3	5:00
	Jamie Fletcher	def.	Aaron Rosa	Unanimous decision	3	5:00
	Shane Del Rosario	def.	Analu Brash	TKO (punches)	1	3:18
	Mark Oshiro	def.	Chris Cariaso	TKO (punches)	1	2:38

== ShoXC 6 ==
The sixth edition of ShoXC took place on April 5, 2008 at the Table Mountain Casino in Friant, California.

Televised bouts
Weight class				Method	Round	Time	Notes
Light Heavyweight	Poai Suganuma	def.	Jared Hamman	KO (flying knee)	1	0:15
Lightweight	Fabricio Camoes	def.	Joe Camacho	KO (punches)	1	2:30
Women's Catchweight (140 lb.)	Shayna Baszler	def.	Keiko Tamai	Submission (twister)	1	2:05
Middleweight	Giva Santana	def.	Matt Lucas	Submission (armbar)	1	4:49
Catchweight (147 lb.)	Bao Quach	def.	Doug Evans	KO (punch)	1	0:55

== ShoXC 7 ==
The seventh edition of ShoXC took place on August 15, 2008 at the Table Mountain Casino in Friant, California. The main event featured a rematch between Jared Hamman and Po'ai Suganuma, who initially fought on the April 5th card.

Televised bouts
Weight class				Method	Round	Time	Notes
	Jared Hamman	def.	Po'ai Suganuma	TKO	1	2:34
	Fabricio Camoes	def.	Sammy Morgan	Submission (rear naked choke)	1	0:47
	Cyrille Diabate	def.	Jamie Fletcher	Unanimous decision	3	5:00
	Rosi Sexton	def.	Debi Purcell	Decision (split)	3	3:00
	Ray Lizama	def.	Keith Berry	TKO	2	2:15

== ShoXC 8 ==
The eighth entry of ShoXC took place on September 26, 2008 at the Chumash Casino in Santa Ynez, California and aired on the Showtime cable network. In the main event, Wilson Reis became the first ever EliteXC Bantamweight Champion.

Televised bouts
Weight class				Method	Round	Time	Notes
	Wilson Reis	def.	Abel Cullum	Unanimous decision	5	5:00	(Note: For the Bantamweight Championship.)
	Shane del Rosario	def.	Carl Seumanutafa	TKO (strikes)	2	1:07
	David Douglas	def.	Malaipet	TKO (strikes)	3	2:51
	Jaime Jara	def.	Giva Santana	Decision (split)	3	5:00
	Erik Apple	def.	Matt Makowski	Submission (rear naked choke)	2	2:04

== ShoXC 9 ==
The ninth and final edition of ShoXC took place on October 10, 2008 at the Horseshoe Casino in Hammond, Indiana and aired on the Showtime cable network.

Televised bouts
Weight class				Method	Round	Time	Notes
	Dave Herman	def.	Kerry Schall	TKO (strikes)	1	1:06
	Mamed Khalidov	def.	Jason Guida	TKO (strikes)	2	4:53
	Anthony Lapsley	def.	Mike Stumpf	Decision (majority)	3	5:00
	Alexander Shlemenko	def.	Bubba McDaniel	TKO (flying knee)	1	5:00
	Lyle Beerbohm	def.	Rafaello Oliveira	TKO (cut)	1	5:00

== See also ==
- List of EliteXC events
