= Shayna Baszler =

American professional wrestler, mixed martial artist, and kickboxer

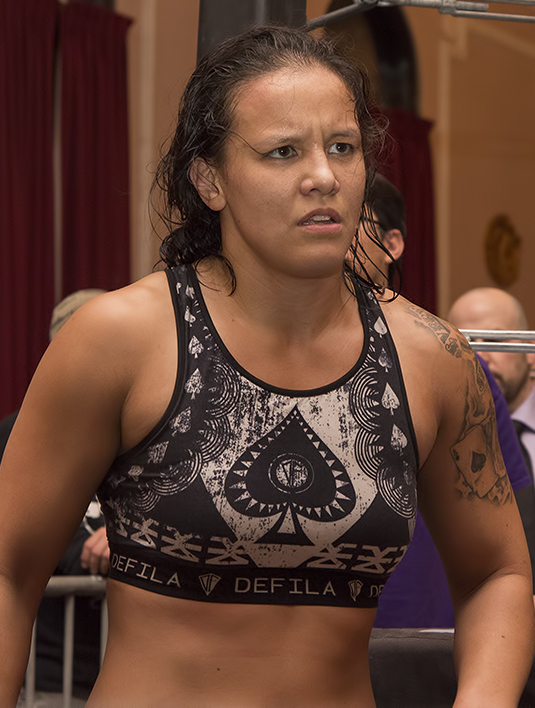
- Baszler in 2016
- Born: Shayna Andrea Baszler; August 8, 1980 (age 46); Sioux Falls, South Dakota, U.S.
- Education: MidAmerica Nazarene University (BA)
- Professional wrestling career
- Ring name: Shayna Baszler
- Billed height: 5 ft 7 in (170 cm)
- Billed weight: 136 lb (62 kg)
- Billed from: Sioux Falls, South Dakota
- Trained by: Josh Barnett; Billy Robinson; Mercedes Martinez; WWE Performance Center
- Debut: 2015
- Martial arts career
- Other names: The Queen of Spades
- Division: Bantamweight; Featherweight; Lightweight
- Stance: Orthodox
- Trainer: Josh Barnett; Billy Robinson
- Rank: Khun kru in Muay Thai; 3rd degree black belt in Brazilian jiu-jitsu

Mixed martial arts record
- Total: 26
- Wins: 15
- By knockout: 1
- By submission: 13
- By decision: 1
- Losses: 11
- By knockout: 7
- By submission: 1
- By decision: 3

Other information
- Mixed martial arts record from Sherdog

Shayna Andrea Baszler (/ˈbeɪzlər/ BAYZ-ler; born August 8, 1980) is an American professional wrestler and a former kickboxer and mixed martial artist. As of October 2026, she is signed to Total Nonstop Action Wrestling (TNA), where she is one-half of Apex and the TNA Knockouts World Tag Team Champions alongside Zoey Serrano. She also performs on the independent circuit. She is best known for her tenure in WWE, where she became a two-time and longest combined-reigning NXT Women's Champion and a three-time WWE Women's Tag Team Champion.

Baszler was trained in mixed martial arts (MMA) by former UFC fighter Josh Barnett and in catch wrestling by Billy Robinson. She had her first professional MMA fight in 2006 and later gained recognition for her skills as a submission grappler. Baszler was signed by the UFC in 2013 for the reality television series The Ultimate Fighter – she would go on to have two professional bouts (0–2) in the company. In 2015, she was cut from the UFC and started her professional wrestling career that same year, being trained by Barnett again. After spending some time on the independent circuit and World Wonder Ring Stardom, Baszler signed with WWE in 2017. She would go on to become a two-time NXT Women's Champion and a three-time WWE Women's Tag Team Champion. In 2025, she was released from WWE.

== Early life and education ==
Shayna Baszler was born and raised in Sioux Falls, South Dakota. She has German, Hungarian and Sioux ancestry on her father's side and Chinese ancestry on her mother's side. Baszler graduated from Lincoln High School in 1998 and attended MidAmerica Nazarene University in Olathe, Kansas, where she graduated with a degree in evangelical Christian studies.

== Mixed martial arts career ==
=== Early career (2006–2007) ===
Baszler faced Amanda Buckner at MFC: USA vs. Russia 3 on June 3, 2006. She lost the fight by TKO in the third round.

She faced Samantha Gavere at NFF: The Breakout on March 10, 2007. She won the fight by kimura submission in the first round.

=== Elite XC and Strikeforce (2007–2010) ===
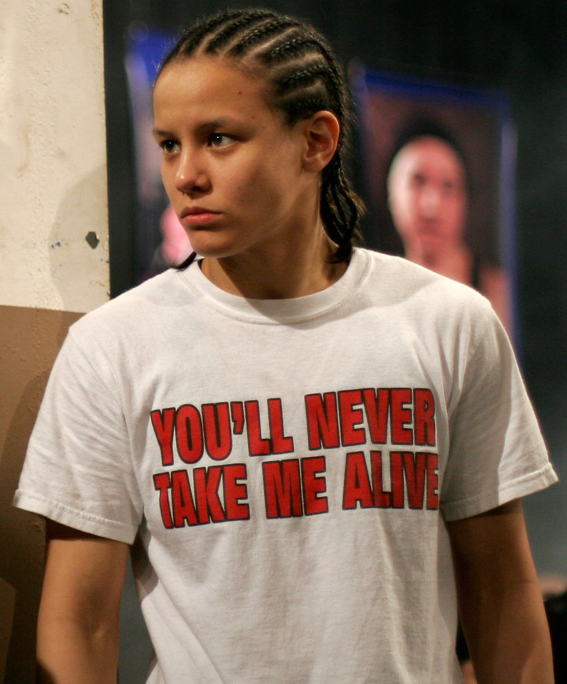
Baszler in 2007

Baszler debuted for EliteXC at a ShoXC event on July 27, 2007. She submitted veteran Jan Finney with a first-round armbar and repeated the feat three months later against Jennifer Tate. After defeating Keiko Tamai with an impressive Twister submission at a third ShoXC event, Baszler moved up to the main EliteXC cards.

Baszler next faced Cris Cyborg on CBS television at EliteXC: Unfinished Business on July 26, 2008. She lost the fight via TKO in the second round.

Following EliteXC's closure, Baszler debuted for Strikeforce at Strikeforce Challengers: Villasenor vs. Cyborg on June 19, 2009, in a fight against Sarah Kaufman, but lost by unanimous decision.

=== Various promotions (2010–2012, 2017) ===
Baszler entered the Freestyle Cage Fighting Women's Bantamweight Grand Prix at FCF 39 on January 30, 2010, in Shawnee, Oklahoma. She submitted Megumi Yabushita with a twister submission in the first round of their quarterfinal bout. It was the second time that Baszler had won an MMA fight with the unique submission. Baszler faced late replacement Alexis Davis in the second round of the FCF tournament at FCF 40 on March 27, 2010. She defeated Davis by unanimous decision. Baszler was scheduled to face Jan Finney in the tournament final at FCF 43 on June 12, 2010. However, Finney withdrew in order to compete in Strikeforce and Baszler faced Adrienna Jenkins instead. Baszler defeated Jenkins by first-round armbar to become FCF Women's Bantamweight Grand Prix Champion.

On November 19, 2010, Baszler faced Elaina Maxwell at The Cage Inc.: Battle at the Border 7. Baszler defeated Maxwell by submission due to a kneebar in the first round to become the first TCI Women's 140 lbs Champion.

Baszler was scheduled to defend her TCI title in a rematch with Alexis Davis at The Cage Inc.: Battle at the Border 10 on July 30, 2011. However, the fight was canceled after Davis signed with Strikeforce.

Baszler agreed to face Kelly Kobold in a rematch at Cage Fighting Xtreme: Spring Brawl on April 21, 2012. However, it was announced on March 16 that the event had been canceled.

On February 25, 2017, Baszler was defeated by Reina Miura at Deep Jewels 15. This marked Baszler's last MMA fight.

=== Invicta Fighting Championships (2012–2013) ===
On April 28, it was announced that Baszler would face Sara McMann in the main event of Invicta FC 2: Baszler vs. McMann. The event took place on July 28, 2012. In a back-and-forth affair, Baszler lost the fight in what was considered to be a controversial unanimous decision. The bout was named Invicta's Fight of the Night.

Baszler faced Sarah D'Alelio at Invicta FC 3: Penne vs. Sugiyama on October 6, 2012. She defeated D'Alelio via submission due to a rear naked choke early in round two.

Baszler faced Alexis Davis in a rematch at Invicta FC 4: Esparza vs. Hyatt on January 5, 2013. She was defeated via technical submission due to a rear naked choke in round three. The bout was named Invicta's Fight of the Night.

=== Ultimate Fighting Championship (2013–2015) ===
==== The Ultimate Fighter ====
In August 2013, it was announced that Baszler was one of the fighters selected to be on The Ultimate Fighter: Team Rousey vs. Team Tate. In her fight to get into the TUF house, Baszler faced Colleen Schneider and won via an armbar submission in the first round. Baszler was then selected by Ronda Rousey as the first team pick and the first fight of the season against Julianna Peña. Baszler lost to Peña after tapping out due to a rear naked choke in the second round.

Baszler was expected to face Sarah Kaufman at The Ultimate Fighter Nations Finale. However, on April 2, 2014, she pulled out of the bout due to an injury.

==== Main roster and departure ====
For her promotional debut, Baszler faced Bethe Correia on August 30, 2014, at UFC 177. She lost the fight via TKO in the second round.

Baszler faced Amanda Nunes on March 21, 2015, at UFC Fight Night 62. She lost the fight via TKO in the first round after taking multiple leg kicks. After going 0–2 with the promotion, Baszler was released from the organization and went on to pursue a professional wrestling career.

== Professional wrestling career ==
=== Early career (2015–2017) ===
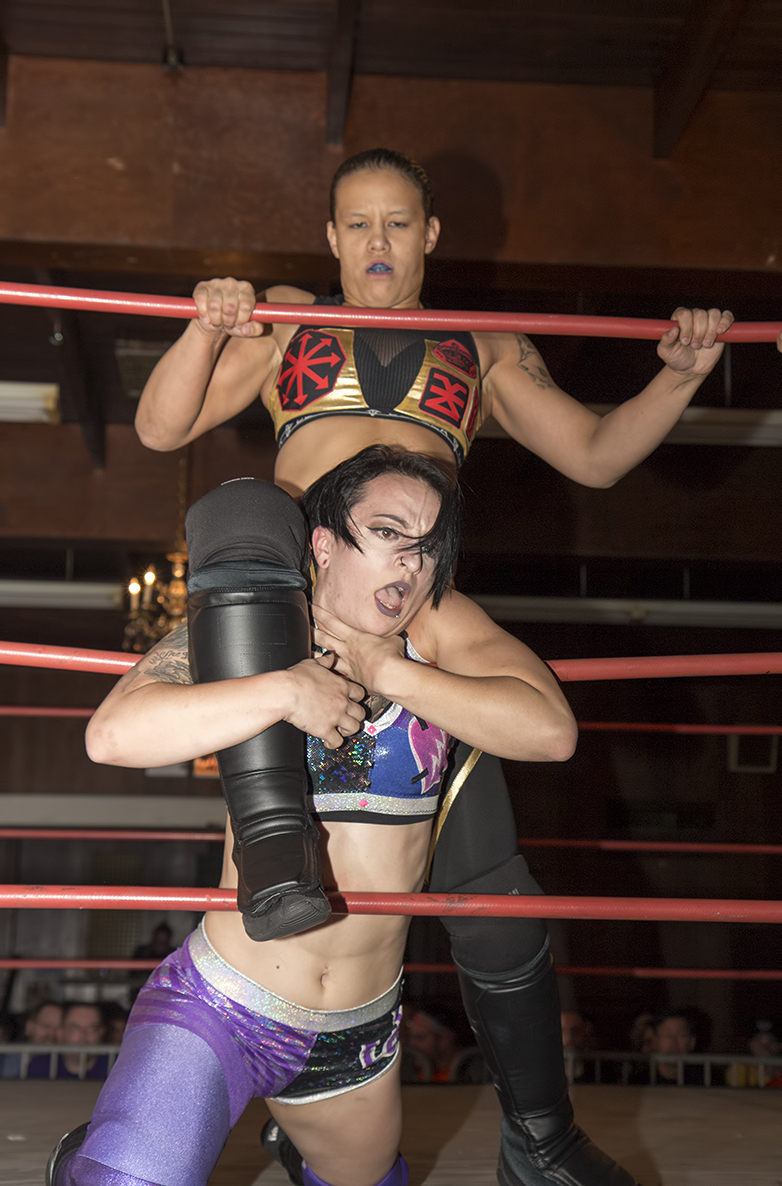
Baszlar faces off against Heidi Lovelace in SHIMMER in 2016

On March 1, 2015, at Ring of Honor's 13th Anniversary Show, Baszler accompanied reDRagon to the ring for their ROH World Tag Team Championship defense. After they won, she helped cut a celebratory promo, where they described her addition to the team as "[finding] our Ringo". After training under Josh Barnett, Baszler made her professional wrestling debut on September 26, 2015, losing to Cheerleader Melissa for Quintessential Pro Wrestling (QPG) in Reno, Nevada. Baszler was attacked by Nicole Matthews after the match, setting up a future match between them. On October 30, Baszler defeated Matthews in their first match against each other, but lost in their second meeting, a KO or submission only match in January 2016, won by Matthews via KO in just over nine minutes. On July 17, Baszler defeated Ruby Raze to become the Premier Women's Champion at Premier XIII.

Baszler debuted for Absolute Intense Wrestling (AIW) in April 2016, losing to Mia Yim. She returned to the promotion in June, defeating Veda Scott, and then again the following month, defeating Annie Social. On September 9, she defeated Heidi Lovelace to become the AIW Women's Champion. She made her first successful defense against Britt Baker on November 5, and again retained the championship against Ray Lyn and Ayzali in a three-way match for Rise Wrestling on November 10. She once again retained the championship against Lovelace in a rematch on November 25.

In June 2016, Baszler made her debut for Shimmer Women Athletes at Volume 81, defeating Rhia O'Reilly. She defeated Solo Darling at volume 82, and at volume 83, she unsuccessfully challenged Nicole Savoy for the Heart Of Shimmer Championship. She once again defeated Mia Yim at Volume 85. She returned in November, teaming with Mercedes Martinez in a loss to The Aussie Squad (Kellie Skater and Shazza McKenzie) at volume 86. At Volume 87, she faced Kay Lee Ray, Heidi Lovelace and Vanessa Kraven in a fatal four-way match, won by Kraven. At Volume 88, she lost to Shazza McKenzie by disqualification. At Volume 89, she once again lost to McKenzie in a no disqualification match. At Volume 90, she once again defeated Heidi Lovelace.

=== World Wonder Ring Stardom (2015, 2017) ===
In October 2015, Baszler worked two events for Japanese promotion World Wonder Ring Stardom, during their American tour in Covina, California, first teaming with Brittany Wonder and Datura in a loss to Oedo Tai (Act Yasukawa, Kris Wolf and Kyoko Kimura), and unsuccessfully challenging Cheerleader Melissa for the GRPW Lady Luck Championship two days later. She returned to the promotion in January 2017, this time touring Japan. She made her debut on January 3, teaming with Jungle Kyona and Mayu Iwatani to defeat Kagetsu, Kyoko Kimura and Sumie Sakai. The following day, she teamed with Nixon Newell and Kay Lee Ray to defeat Iwatani, Kairi Hojo and Konami. The following day, she faced Himomi Mimura and Viper in a triple threat match won by Viper. On January 15, she took part in another triple threat match, this time defeating Momo Watanabe and Jungle Kyona. On January 29, she teamed with Deonna Purrazzo and Christi Jaynes to defeat Kagetsu, Kris Wolf and Viper. On February 23, Baszler unsuccessfully challenged Io Shirai for the World of Stardom Championship.

=== WWE (2017–2025) ===
==== NXT Women's Champion (2017–2020) ====
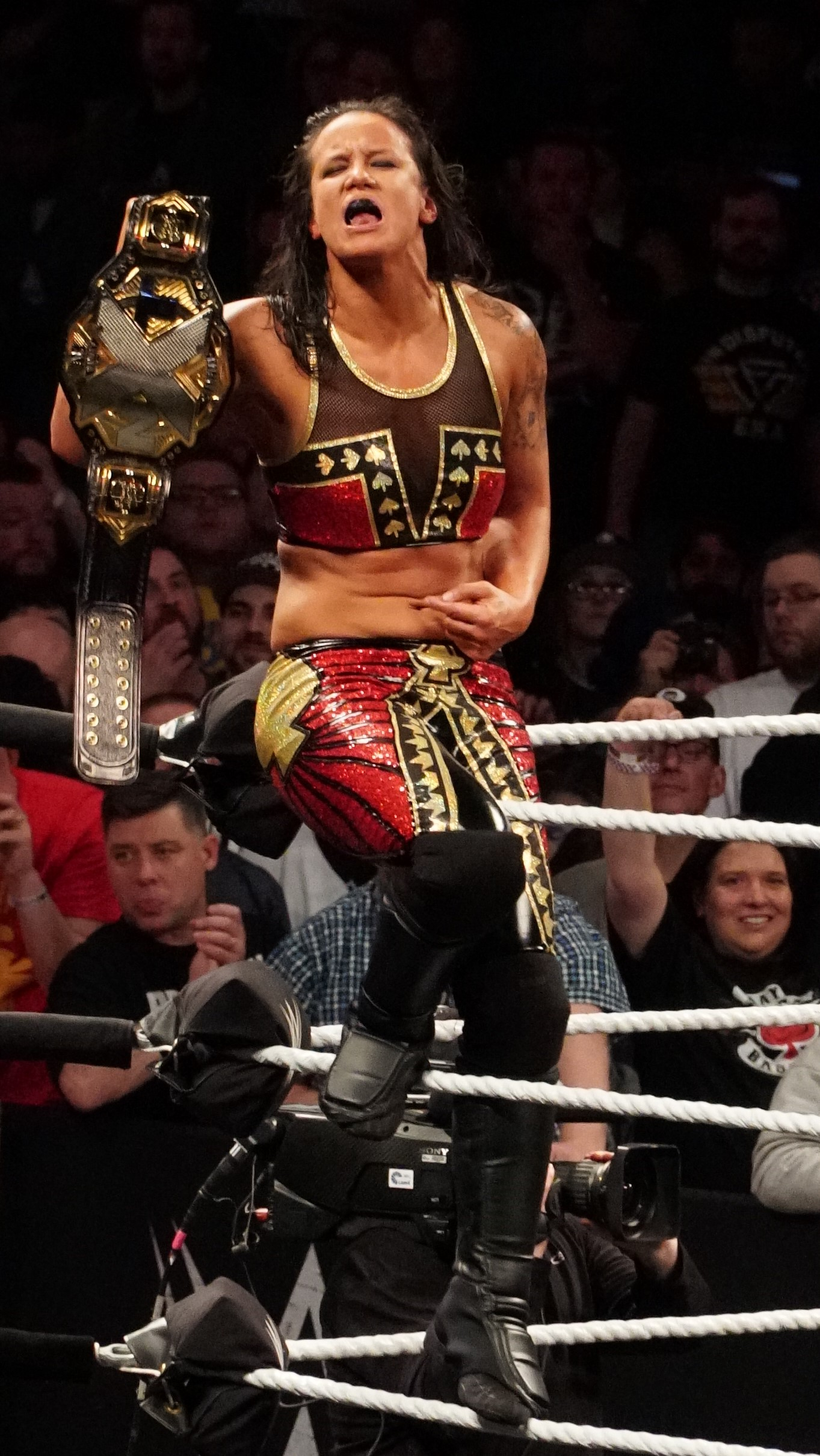
Baszler after winning the NXT Women's Championship in April 2018

On August 28, 2017, Baszler entered the Mae Young Classic tournament promoted by WWE, defeating Zeda in the first round. The following week, Baszler defeated Mia Yim, Candice LeRae, and Mercedes Martinez en route to the final. On September 12, Baszler was defeated in the final of the tournament by Kairi Sane.

Baszler made her NXT debut at a house show on August 10, 2017, where she teamed with The Iconic Duo (Billie Kay and Peyton Royce) to face Kairi Sane, Aliyah, and Dakota Kai in a losing effort. On August 12, she made her singles debut by defeating Zeda. On October 3, WWE officially announced that Baszler had signed with the company and started training at the WWE Performance Center.

On the December 6 episode of NXT, a vignette aired teasing Baszler's televised debut. She made her televised debut by attacking Kairi Sane on the December 27 episode of NXT. On the January 10, 2018, episode of NXT, she made her in-ring debut, defeating Dakota Kai by referee stoppage. Baszler continued to attack Kai until NXT Women's Champion Ember Moon made the save, leading to a title match at NXT TakeOver: Philadelphia on January 27, where Moon defeated Baszler to retain the title, but was attacked by her afterwards. Baszler received another title match against Moon at NXT TakeOver: New Orleans on April 7, where Baszler defeated Moon by technical submission to win the NXT Women's Championship. She then began a feud with Nikki Cross, culminating in a title match at NXT TakeOver: Chicago II on June 16, which Baszler won.

At NXT TakeOver: Brooklyn 4 on August 18, Baszler lost the title to Kairi Sane, ending her first reign at 133 days. At Evolution on October 28, she defeated Sane in a rematch to regain the title, becoming the first-ever two-time NXT Women's Champion. Baszler went on to successfully defend her title against Sane at NXT TakeOver: WarGames on November 17, Bianca Belair at NXT TakeOver: Phoenix on January 26, 2019, and in a fatal four-way match against Sane, Belair, and Io Shirai at NXT TakeOver: New York on April 5. Baszler then started a feud with Shirai, retaining her title against Shirai at NXT TakeOver: XXV on June 1 and on the June 26 episode of NXT in a steel cage match to end the feud. At NXT TakeOver: Toronto on August 10, she defeated Mia Yim to retain her title.

On the November 1 episode of SmackDown, Baszler was the first NXT wrestler to invade the show, when she attacked Nikki Cross, Sasha Banks, and SmackDown Women's Champion Bayley; later that night, Baszler joined Triple H and the rest of the NXT roster as they declared war on both Raw and SmackDown, and vowed to win the Survivor Series brand warfare. At NXT TakeOver: WarGames on November 23, Baszler and her team lost against Rhea Ripley and her team in the first ever women's WarGames match. On the next day at Survivor Series, Baszler won the triple threat match against Raw Women's Champion Becky Lynch and SmackDown Women's Champion Bayley to win Survivor Series for the NXT brand. On the December 18 episode of NXT, Baszler lost the championship to Ripley, ending her second reign at 416 days, making her the sixth longest reigning women's champion after Sensational Sherri's reign of 441 days. On January 26, 2020, at Royal Rumble, she would enter the women's Royal Rumble match at #30 and go on to eliminate 8 contestants, which tied the record for most eliminations in a women's Royal Rumble match, before being the last woman eliminated by Charlotte Flair, who would win the match. On the January 22 episode of NXT, Baszler defeated Shotzi Blackheart in what would be her final match in NXT.

==== Teaming with Nia Jax (2020–2021) ====
On the February 10 episode of Raw, Baszler made her main roster debut by attacking Raw Women's Champion Becky Lynch, biting the back of Lynch's neck furiously. At Elimination Chamber on March 8, Baszler won the Elimination Chamber match to become the #1 contender for the Raw Women's Championship, while also setting a record by eliminating every other woman. On the first night of WrestleMania 36 on April 4, Baszler failed to win the title from Lynch after a roll-up pin, with her push reportedly being cancelled by Vince McMahon over criticisms about her MMA style, despite other talents such as Brock Lesnar using the same. At Money in the Bank on May 10, Baszler failed to win the briefcase which contained the Raw Women's Championship instead of the contract, also reportedly due to her push being cancelled. However, all of these circumstances of Baszler's push being cancelled were contradicted by Shayna Baszler herself during a December 2025 interview with Chris Van Vliet, stating that her WrestleMania loss was due to the lack of a live crowd and her Money in the Bank loss was due to Becky Lynch's surprise pregnancy.

At Payback on August 30, Baszler and Nia Jax defeated Bayley and Sasha Banks to win the WWE Women's Tag Team Championship. They lost the titles to Asuka and Charlotte Flair on December 20 at TLC: Tables, Ladders & Chairs, ending their first reign at 112 days; they later regained the titles from Asuka and Flair on the Royal Rumble Kickoff show on January 31, 2021. On the second night of WrestleMania 37 on April 11, Baszler and Jax retained the titles against Natalya and Tamina. After multiple singles and tag team matches between the two teams, Baszler and Jax lost the titles to Natalya and Tamina on the May 14 episode of SmackDown, ending their second reign at 103 days.

On the May 31 episode of Raw, Baszler began feuding with Alexa Bliss, claiming that the use of Bliss' "powers" were the reason why Baszler and Jax lost the titles. A match between the two was scheduled for Hell in a Cell on June 20, which Bliss won. Tensions kept rising between Baszler and Jax, and on the September 20 episode of Raw, their alliance ended when she brutally attacked Jax after their match against each other.

As part of the 2021 Draft, Baszler was drafted to the SmackDown brand. In October, Baszler entered the Queen's Crown tournament, where she defeated Dana Brooke in the first round but lost to Doudrop in the semi-finals. She participated in the 5 on 5 Survivor Series elimination match at Survivor Series on November 21, eliminating Rhea Ripley before she was eliminated by Bianca Belair.

==== Storyline with Ronda Rousey (2022–2023) ====
She also participated in the Royal Rumble match at the namesake event on January 19, 2022, entering at #30 but was eliminated by Charlotte Flair. During this time, Baszler formed a tag team with Natalya and challenged for the WWE Women's Tag Team Championship, leading to a fatal four-way tag team match for the titles on the second night of WrestleMania 38 on April 3, which was won by Sasha Banks and Naomi. On the June 3 episode of SmackDown, Baszler competed in a six-pack challenge to determine the #1 contender for the SmackDown Women's Championship, which was won by Natalya. Baszler failed to qualify for the Money in the Bank ladder match after losing to Raquel Rodriguez on the June 17 episode of SmackDown, and a six-woman elimination match on the June 27 episode of Raw. On the August 5 episode of SmackDown, Baszler won a gauntlet match for the opportunity to face Liv Morgan for the SmackDown Women's Championship at Clash at the Castle on September 3, but failed to win the title at the event.

On the October 28 episode of SmackDown, Baszler attacked Natalya in a backstage segment, ending their partnership and aligning with SmackDown Women's Champion and real-life best friend Ronda Rousey in the process. The following week, with Rousey in her corner, Baszler defeated Natalya. At Survivor Series WarGames on November 26, Baszler helped Rousey retain her title against Shotzi. On Night 2 of WrestleMania 39, Rousey and Baszler won the Women's WrestleMania Showcase fatal four-way tag team match despite Rousey barely being involved in the match. As part of the 2023 WWE Draft, Baszler and Rousey were drafted to the Raw brand as a team. On the May 29 episode of Raw, Baszler and Rousey won a fatal four-way tag team match for the vacant WWE Women's Tag Team Championship. On the June 23 episode of SmackDown, Baszler and Rousey defeated Alba Fyre and Isla Dawn for the NXT Women's Tag Team Championship to unify the two tag team titles. For unknown reasons, WWE does not recognize Rousey and Baszler's reign, instead incorrectly recognizing Fyre and Dawn as the final NXT Women's Tag Team Champions.

On July 1, at Money in the Bank, Baszler turned on Rousey by attacking her and walking out of the match, turning face for the first time in her career, allowing Liv Morgan and Raquel Rodriguez to take advantage and pinning Rousey to regain the WWE Women's Tag Team Championship, ending their reign at 32 days. On the July 3 episode of Raw, Baszler confronted Rousey, frustrated as she had to pay her dues to get to the WWE, while Rousey had her first match at WrestleMania. This led into a brawl between the two, which ended with Baszler kneeing Rousey in the face. On the July 10 episode of Raw, after Baszlers match versus Emma, Rousey came out and another brawl broke out. This ended with Baszler barely escaping the ring after receiving an arm bar from Rousey. The following week, after defeating Nikki Cross in a match, Rousey called out Baszler from the skybox, then Baszler challenged Rousey to a fight after calling her out for taking the easy way into WWE while she herself had to work hard to get into WWE, though Rousey refused and instead offered to face Baszler at SummerSlam in a MMA rules match. Baszler defeated Rousey at SummerSlam, choking her unconscious and winning by technical submission.

==== Final storylines (2023–2025) ====
On the September 4 episode of Raw, Baszler defeated Zoey Stark by technical submission after Stark passed out to the Kirifuda Clutch. After the match, Baszler gave praise to Stark's toughness. In the following week, Stark ran out to save Baszler when Baszler was attacked by Chelsea Green and Piper Niven after Baszler's match with Green. At Crown Jewel on November 4, Baszler competed in a fatal five-way match for the Women's World Championship against Stark, Jax, Raquel Rodriguez and defending champion Rhea Ripley, but failed to win the title. At Raw: Day 1 on January 1, 2024, Baszler teamed up with Stark for the first time to defeat Tegan Nox and Natalya to become the number 1 contender for the WWE Women's Tag Team Championship.

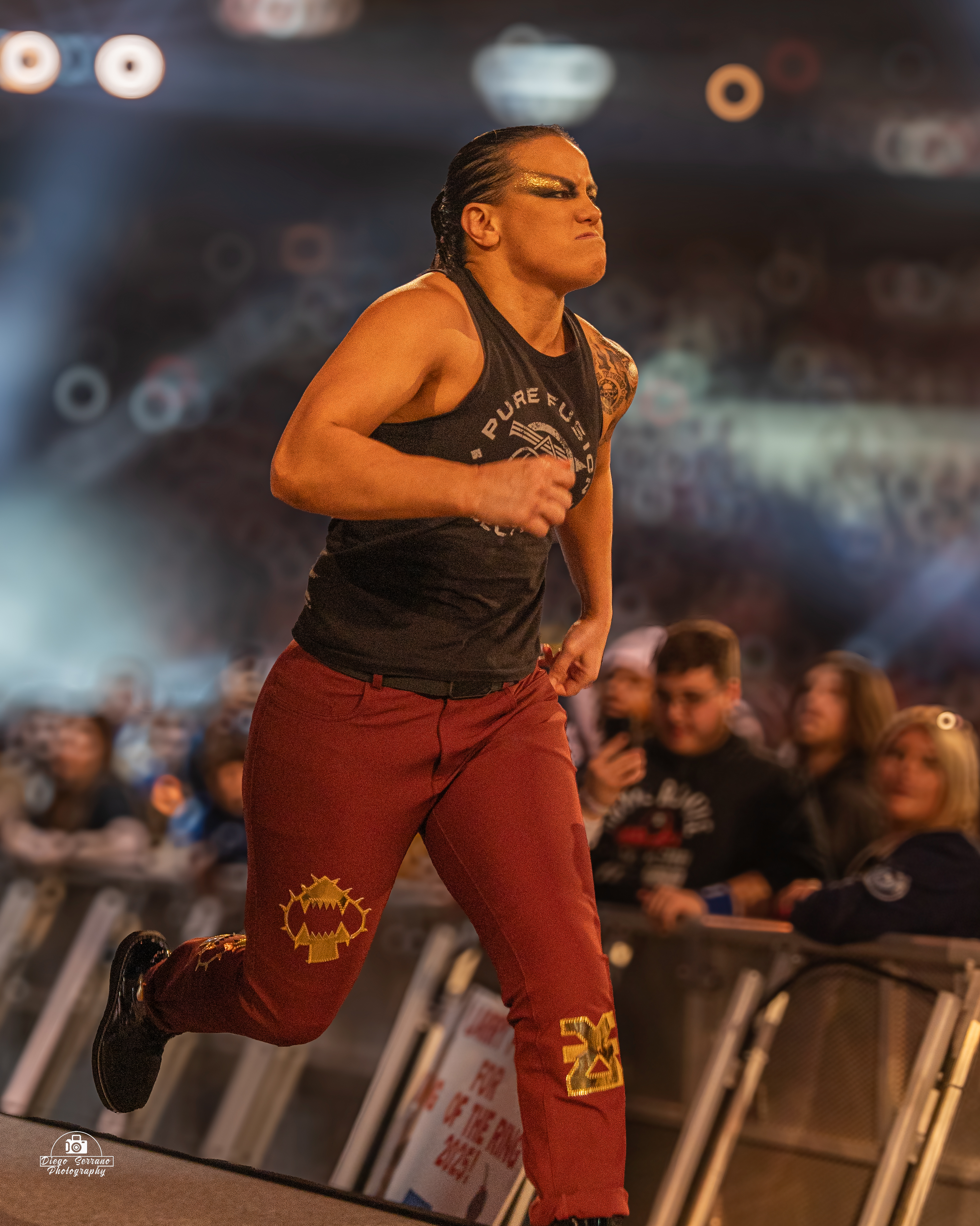
Baszler in February 2025.

On Week 1 of the 2024 Spring Breakin' edition of NXT, Baszler made her return to NXT teaming with Lola Vice against Natalya and Karmen Petrovic. At Week 2 of Spring Breakin', Vice won the match. Baszler entered the Queen of the Ring tournament, defeating Maxxine Dupri in the first round but lost to Iyo Sky in the quarterfinals. On the May 14 episode of NXT, Natalya and Petrovic challenged Vice and Baszler to a tag team match on next week's episode, which was made official. On the May 20 episode of Raw, Baszler and Stark won a fatal four-way tag team match to become the number one contenders for Bianca Belair and Jade Cargill's WWE Women's Tag Team Championship. On the May 21 episode of NXT, Baszler and Vice was defeated by Natalya and Petrovic. After that, Vice turned on Baszler, and a brawl started between the two. NXT General Manager Ava then announced a match between the two at NXT Battleground, where Baszler proposed an NXT Underground match, which was made official. On June 4 episode of Raw, Baszler and Stark challenged Belair and Cargill to a title match, but ended in a disqualification win for Belair and Cargill after Alba Fyre and Isla Dawn interfered. On June 9 at Battleground, Baszler was defeated by Vice. On June 15 at Clash at the Castle: Scotland, Baszler and Stark competed in a triple threat tag team match for the WWE Women's Tag Team Championship, which The Unholy Union won. On the July 8 episode of Raw, Baszler and Stark aligned themselves with the returning Sonya Deville after weeks of declining the latter's offer, turning heel and later calling themselves Pure Fusion Collective. On May 2, WWE informed that Baszler's contract will expire on July 31, ending her eight-year tenure with the company and effectively disbanding Pure Fusion Collective.

==== Non-wrestling roles and sporadic appearances (2025–present) ====
Despite having been released under a 90-day non-compete clause, Baszler was reported to be listed as a producer on the July 9 episode of NXT, where she produced a match alongside Christopher Girard. On the September 16 episode of NXT: Homecoming, Baszler made an appearance in a backstage segment, encouraging Sol Ruca and Zaria to get back on the same page as a tag team. In a December 2025 interview with Chris Van Vliet, Baszler reveals she continues to work for WWE on occasion as a guest coach at the WWE Performance Center. She made an appearance in an NXT promo with Kelani Jordan on March 3, 2026, training Jordan for her underground match against Lola Vice (whom Baszler previously had an underground match against) at NXT Vengeance Day.

=== Independent circuit (2025–present) ===
On October 5, 2025, Baszler made her first post-WWE appearance at Prestige Wrestling's Roseland XII, where she defeated Dani Luna. On November 2, Baszler made her debut for Boca Raton Championship Wrestling (BRCW) at November Knockdown, where she defeated Lacey Lane to win the vacant BRCW Women's Championship. On November 15, Baszler made her debut for House of Glory (HOG) at Superclash, where she defeated Maki Itoh.

On July 25, 2026, Baslzer made her debut for Revolution Pro Wrestling (RevPro), competing in the Women’s Grand Prix, where she was eliminated by Kanji in the semi-final. The following day, Baszler reunited with former tag team partner Zoey Serrano (formerly Zoey Stark in WWE) to defeat Kanji and Myla Grace.

=== Total Nonstop Action Wrestling (2026–present) ===
Baszler made her debut for Total Nonstop Action Wrestling (TNA) at Bound for Glory on October 11, 2026, partnering with Zoey Serrano to defeat Allie and Kiera Hogan for the TNA Knockouts World Tag Team Championship. Baszler and Serrano later adopted the tag team name of "Apex". On October 22, it was announced that Baszler had signed with TNA.

== Martial arts background and persona ==
Baszler, a khun kru (teacher) in Muay Thai and a Brazilian jiu-jitsu practitioner, wanted to begin incorporating Josh Barnett's catch wrestling style into her MMA training. This proved to be somewhat difficult because she could not train with Barnett in Southern California, so Barnett wrote a syllabus and filmed a video to teach her the step-by-step techniques and concepts of catch wrestling and give her tips on how to improve her verbal skills. Baszler competed at the 2016 Frank Gotch World Catch Championships in Gotch's hometown of Humboldt, Iowa, winning the women's openweight division.

Barnett suggested that Baszler carry an electric guitar to the cage to show that she was outspoken. Baszler reluctantly agreed, and the guitar became a signature of her rockstar-like persona. Later, Barnett gave Baszler "The Queen of Spades" nickname due to her ability to perform card tricks – the card magic nickname also gives a nod to her "submission magic." Baszler refers to her fans as the "Queen's Army."

== Other media ==
Baszler made her WWE video game debut as a playable character in WWE 2K19, and returned for WWE 2K20. She also appeared in WWE 2K22, WWE 2K23, WWE 2K24 and WWE 2K25.

== Personal life ==
During a 2013 interview on the MMA Roasted podcast, Baszler mentioned that she was dating a woman, though she did not label her sexuality at that time. An Outsports article in 2024 referred to her as an "out LGBTQ pro wrestler".

Baszler was a key spokesperson in the movement to create a South Dakota athletic commission for combat sports. She once delivered a speech that touched opposing Rep. Steve Hickey, who once labeled MMA as the "child porn" of sports. After visiting Baszler at the Next Edge Academy of Martial Arts, the training place of Baszler, as well as other mixed martial arts fighters and practitioners, Hickey changed his mind about the sport.

Outside of combat sports, Baszler coaches the South Dakota–based roller derby team, the Sioux Falls Roller Dollz and is a certified Emergency Medical Technician (EMT).

Baszler is also a fan of the Warhammer 40,000 franchise and occasionally incorporates the designs of certain Space Marine chapters into her ring gear.

== Championships and accomplishments ==
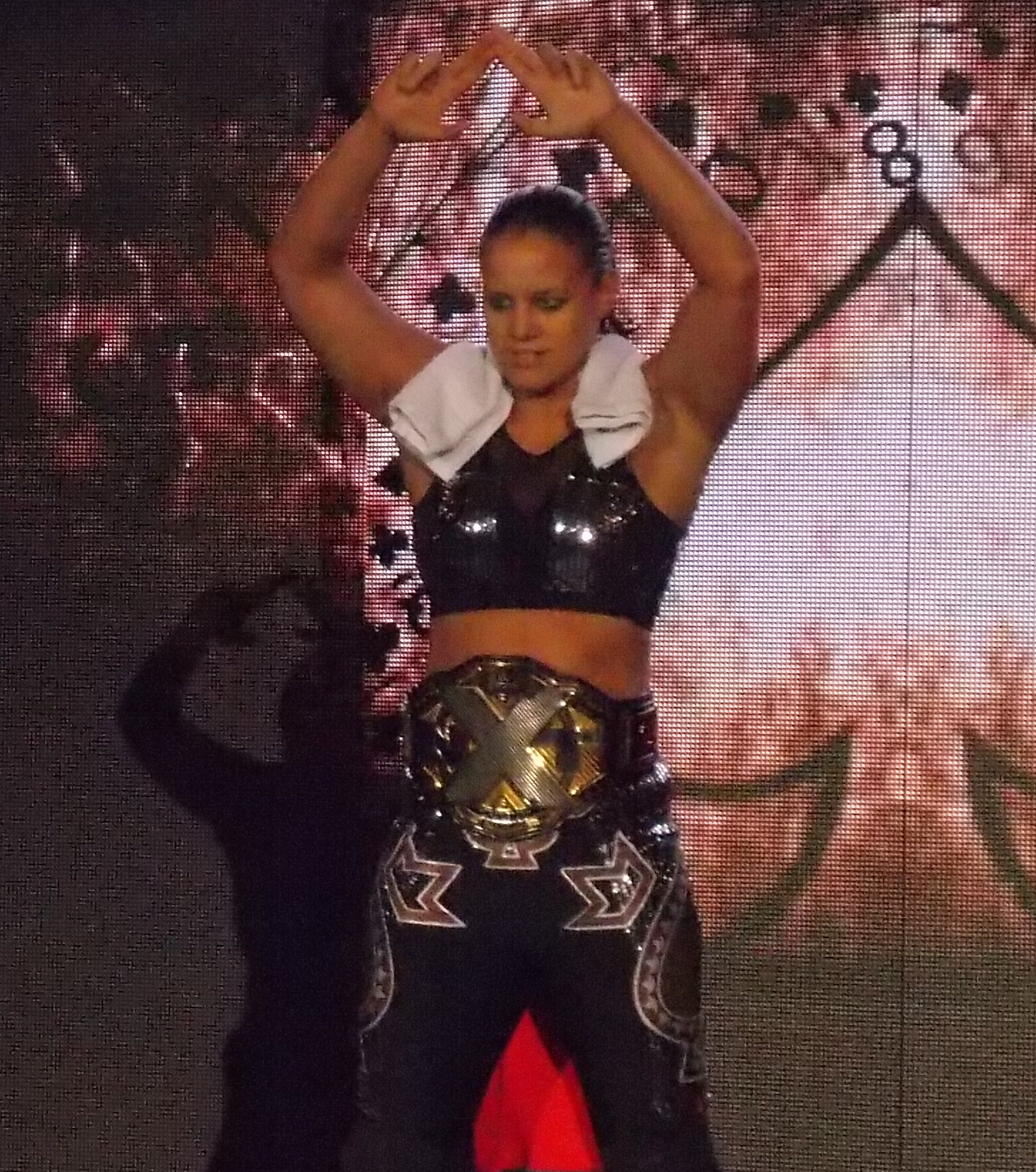
Baszler is a two-time NXT Women's Champion and held the title for a combined total of 549 days, making it the longest reign in the title's history.

=== Mixed martial arts ===
- Freestyle Cage Fighting
  - FCF Women's Bantamweight Grand Prix Championship (1 time)
- Invicta FC
  - Fight of the Night (2 times) vs. Sara McMann, Alexis Davis
- The Cage Inc.
  - TCI Women's 140 lbs Championship (1 time, first)

=== Submission grappling ===
- Catch Wrestling Alliance
  - 2016 Frank Gotch World Catch Championships - Champion, Women's Openweight
- International Federation of Associated Wrestling Styles
  - FILA 2009 Grappling World Championships Senior No-Gi Silver Medalist
  - FILA 2009 Grappling World Championships Senior Gi Silver Medalist
- USA Wrestling
  - FILA 2011 World Team Trials Senior No-Gi Gold Medalist
  - FILA 2009 World Team Trials Senior Gi Gold Medalist
  - FILA 2009 World Team Trials Senior No-Gi Gold Medalist
  - FILA 2007 World Team Trials Senior No-Gi Bronze Medalist

=== Professional wrestling ===
- Absolute Intense Wrestling
  - AIW Women's Championship (1 time)
- Boca Raton Championship Wrestling
  - BRCW Women's Championship (1 time)
- DDT Pro-Wrestling
  - Ironman Heavymetalweight Championship (1 time)
- New Horizon Pro Wrestling
  - IndyGurlz Australian Championship (1 time)
  - Global Conflict Shield Tournament (2017)
- Premier Wrestling
  - Premier Women's Championship (1 time)
- Pro Wrestling Illustrated
  - Ranked No. 4 of the top 100 female wrestlers in the PWI Female 100 in 2019
  - Ranked No. 24 of the top 50 Tag Teams in the PWI Tag Team 50 in 2021- with Nia Jax
- Quintessential Pro Wrestling
  - QPW Women's Championship (1 time)
- Sports Illustrated
  - Ranked No. 4 of the top 10 women's wrestlers in 2019
- Total Nonstop Action Wrestling
  - TNA Knockouts World Tag Team Championship (1 time, current) – with Zoey Serrano
- World Series Wrestling
  - WSW Women's Championship (one time)
- WWE
  - NXT Women's Championship (2 times)
  - WWE Women's Tag Team Championship (3 times) – with Nia Jax (2) and Ronda Rousey (1)
  - NXT Year-End Award (1 time)
    - Female Competitor of the Year (2019)
  - Women's Elimination Chamber (2020)

== Mixed martial arts record ==
Professional record breakdown
26 matches	15 wins	11 losses
By knockout	1	6
By submission	13	2
By decision	1	3

Res.	Record	Opponent	Method	Event	Date	Round	Time	Location	Notes
Loss	15–11	Reina Miura	Decision (unanimous)	Deep Jewels 15	February 25, 2017	2	5:00	Tokyo, Japan	Lightweight bout.
Loss	15–10	Amanda Nunes	TKO (leg kick)	UFC Fight Night: Maia vs. LaFlare	March 21, 2015	1	1:56	Rio de Janeiro, Brazil	
Loss	15–9	Bethe Correia	TKO (punches)	UFC 177	August 30, 2014	2	1:56	Sacramento, California, United States	
Loss	15–8	Alexis Davis	Technical Submission (rear-naked choke)	Invicta FC 4: Esparza vs. Hyatt	January 5, 2013	3	0:58	Kansas City, Kansas, United States	Fight of the Night
Win	15–7	Sarah D'Alelio	Submission (rear-naked choke)	Invicta FC 3: Penne vs. Sugiyama	October 6, 2012	2	0:37	Kansas City, Kansas, United States	
Loss	14–7	Sara McMann	Decision (unanimous)	Invicta FC 2: Baszler vs. McMann	July 28, 2012	3	5:00	Kansas City, Kansas, United States	Fight of the Night
Win	14–6	Elaina Maxwell	Submission (kneebar)	The Cage Inc.: Battle at the Border 7	November 19, 2010	1	4:03	Hankinson, North Dakota, United States	Became inaugural TCI Women's 140 lbs Champion
Win	13–6	Adrienna Jenkins	Submission (armbar)	Freestyle Cage Fighting 42	June 12, 2010	1	2:12	Shawnee, Oklahoma, United States	Became FCF Women's Bantamweight Grand Prix Champion
Win	12–6	Alexis Davis	Decision (unanimous)	Freestyle Cage Fighting 40	March 27, 2010	3	5:00	Shawnee, Oklahoma, United States	
Win	11–6	Megumi Yabushita	Submission (twister)	Freestyle Cage Fighting 39	January 30, 2010	1	4:50	Shawnee, Oklahoma, United States	
Loss	10–6	Sarah Kaufman	Decision (unanimous)	Strikeforce Challengers: Villasenor vs. Cyborg	June 19, 2009	3	5:00	Kent, Washington, United States	
Loss	10–5	Cris Cyborg	TKO (punches)	EliteXC: Unfinished Business	July 26, 2008	2	2:48	Stockton, California, United States	
Win	10–4	Keiko Tamai	Submission (twister)	ShoXC: Elite Challenger Series	April 5, 2008	1	2:05	Friant, California, United States	
Win	9–4	Jennifer Tate	Submission (armbar)	ShoXC: Elite Challenger Series	October 26, 2007	1	0:44	Santa Ynez, California, United States	
Win	8–4	Jan Finney	Submission (armbar)	ShoXC: Elite Challenger Series	July 27, 2007	1	2:40	Santa Ynez, California, United States	
Win	7–4	Samantha Gavere	Submission (kimura)	NFF: The Breakout	March 10, 2007	1	1:00	Minneapolis, Minnesota, United States	
Loss	6–4	Tara LaRosa	TKO (punches)	BodogFight: Costa Rica	February 18, 2007	2	3:15	Costa Rica	
Win	6–3	Roxanne Modafferi	Submission (hammerlock)	MARS: BodogFight	October 4, 2006	1	1:08	Tokyo, Japan	
Loss	5–3	Amanda Buckner	TKO (punches)	MFC: USA vs Russia 3	June 3, 2006	3	3:03	Atlantic City, New Jersey, United States	
Win	5–2	Julie Kedzie	Submission (armbar)	Freestyle Combat Challenge 22	March 18, 2006	1	N/A	Racine, Wisconsin, United States	
Loss	4–2	Amanda Buckner	Submission (armbar)	Ring of Fire 20: Elite	December 10, 2005	1	4:28	Castle Rock, Colorado, United States	
Win	4–1	Cindy Romero	TKO (submission to punches)	UCS: Battle At The Barn 9	May 7, 2005	1	N/A	Rochester, Minnesota, United States	
Win	3–1	Heather Lobs	Submission (choke)	Jungle Madness 2	January 15, 2005	1	1:51	Minnesota, United States	
Loss	2–1	Kelly Kobold	TKO (submission to punches)	Reality Cage Fighting	May 15, 2004	2	2:20	South Dakota, United States	
Win	2–0	Christy Zimmerman	Submission (armbar)	Reality Cage Fighting	November 14, 2003	1	N/A	South Dakota, United States	
Win	1–0	Tina Johnson	Submission (armbar)	Reality Cage Fighting	October 31, 2003	1	1:20	South Dakota, United States	

Exhibition record breakdown		
2 matches	1 win	1 loss
By submission	1	1

Res.	Record	Opponent	Method	Event	Date	Round	Time	Location	Notes
Loss	1–1	Julianna Peña	Submission (rear-naked choke)	The Ultimate Fighter: Team Rousey vs. Team Tate	September 11, 2013 (air date)	2	3:08	Las Vegas, Nevada, United States	TUF 18 Quarter Final round.
Win	1–0	Colleen Schneider	Submission (armbar)	The Ultimate Fighter: Team Rousey vs. Team Tate	September 4, 2013 (air date)	1	4:24	Las Vegas, Nevada, United States	TUF 18 elimination round.

== See also ==
- List of female mixed martial artists
- List of multi-sport athletes
