= Aaron Rosa =

American mixed martial arts fighter

- Born: May 28, 1983 (age 43); Del Rio, Texas, United States
- Other names: Big Red
- Height: 6 ft 3 in (1.91 m)
- Weight: 205.8 lb (93 kg; 14 st 10 lb)
- Division: Heavyweight; Light Heavyweight
- Reach: 77.0 in (196 cm)
- Fighting out of: San Antonio, Texas, United States
- Team: Team Punishment
- Years active: 2005-2013

Professional boxing record
- Total: 2
- Draws: 2

Mixed martial arts record
- Total: 25
- Wins: 18
- By knockout: 6
- By submission: 4
- By decision: 8
- Losses: 7
- By knockout: 4
- By submission: 2
- By decision: 1

Other information
- Boxing record from BoxRec
- Mixed martial arts record from Sherdog

Aaron Isaac Rosa (born May 28, 1983) is an American former professional mixed martial artist. A professional competitor from 2005 until 2013, he has competed for the UFC, Bellator, ShoXC, and Strikeforce.

== Background ==
Born and raised in the border-town of Del Rio, Texas, Rosa was a talented football player, competing at Del Rio High School before continuing his career at Angelo State University, where he was also a standout. In January 2004, Rosa began training in mixed martial arts.

== Mixed martial arts career ==
=== Early career ===
Rosa made his amateur debut later that year in 2004 and made his professional debut in November 2005. Rosa compiled an undefeated record of 9–0 fighting on the local circuit before being signed by ShoXC.

=== ShoXC ===
Rosa made his promotional debut on July 27, 2007, at ShoXC: Elite Challengers Series against Jefferson Silva and won via TKO. Rosa made his next appearance on October 26, 2007, against Jared Hamman and was handed his first professional defeat via rear-naked choke submission in the second round. Rosa then faced Jaime Fletcher on March 21, 2008, and was defeated again, via unanimous decision.

Rosa was scheduled to fight Seth Petruzelli, at EliteXC: Heat, but Petruzelli was moved to the main event to fight Kevin "Kimbo Slice" Ferguson after Ken Shamrock had to pull out due to an injury.

=== Strikeforce ===
After picking up a win under the Adrenaline MMA banner, Rosa made his Strikeforce debut at Strikeforce Challengers: Evangelista vs. Aina on May 15, 2009, in a Light Heavyweight bout against Anthony Ruiz. Rosa won via rear-naked choke submission in the first round. Rosa made his next appearance on November 20, 2009, at Strikeforce Challengers: Woodley vs. Bears against Rafael Cavalcante. Rosa was defeated in the second round via TKO.

At Bellator 20 he defeated veteran Robert Villegas by unanimous decision. Rosa then defeated The Ultimate Fighter 10 alumnus Abe Wagner via submission at Titan FC 17: Lashley vs. Ott.

=== Ultimate Fighting Championship ===
On May 13, 2011, it was announced that Rosa had signed with the UFC.

He made his debut against Joey Beltran at UFC 131. After a back-and-forth first two rounds, Rosa was stopped by Beltran by TKO in the third round.

Rosa was expected to face Fabio Maldonado in a Light Heavyweight bout at UFC Live: Cruz vs. Johnson. But Maldonado was forced to pull out of the bout due to an injury.

Rosa instead faced promotional newcomer Matt Lucas on November 12, 2011, at UFC on Fox 1. He won the fight via majority decision.

Rosa had his next Light Heavyweight bout against James Te-Huna on March 3, 2012, at UFC on FX 2. Rosa lost via TKO in the first round and was subsequently released from the promotion.

=== Bellator ===
After his release from the UFC, Rosa made his return to Bellator at Bellator 103 on October 11, 2013, facing Mikhail Zayats. Rosa was defeated 47 seconds into the first round via submission.

=== Return to MMA ===
After more the 9 years away from the sport, Rosa made his return against Juan Adams at Fury FC 56 on February 6, 2022. Rosa lost the bout in the first round via ground and pound TKO.

== Personal life ==
Rosa is married and has 2 daughters and a son.

== Mixed martial arts record ==
Professional record breakdown
25 matches	18 wins	7 losses
By knockout	6	4
By submission	4	2
By decision	8	1

Res.	Record	Opponent	Method	Event	Date	Round	Time	Location	Notes
Loss	18–7	Juan Adams	TKO (punches)	Fury FC 56	February 6, 2022	1	3:08	San Antonio, Texas, United States	Return to Heavyweight.
Loss	18–6	Mikhail Zayats	Submission (kimura)	Bellator 103	October 11, 2013	1	0:47	Mulvane, Kansas, United States	
Win	18–5	Tony Melton	Decision (split)	EODV: El Orgulo del Valle	March 16, 2013	3	3:00	Pharr, Texas, United States	
Loss	17–5	James Te-Huna	TKO (punches)	UFC on FX: Alves vs. Kampmann	March 3, 2012	1	2:08	Sydney, Australia	
Win	17–4	Matt Lucas	Decision (majority)	UFC on Fox: Velasquez vs. Dos Santos	November 12, 2011	3	5:00	Anaheim, California, United States	Return to Light Heavyweight.
Loss	16–4	Joey Beltran	TKO (punches)	UFC 131	June 11, 2011	3	1:26	Vancouver, British Columbia, Canada	
Win	16–3	Abe Wagner	Submission (rear-naked choke)	Titan FC 17: Lashley vs. Ott	March 25, 2011	2	0:35	Kansas City, Kansas, United States	
Win	15–3	Devin Cole	Decision (unanimous)	Shark Fights 13: Jardine vs Prangley	September 11, 2010	3	5:00	Amarillo, Texas, United States	Heavyweight debut.
Win	14–3	Jay Peche	TKO (punches)	ABG: Promotions	July 17, 2010	1	4:47	San Antonio, Texas, United States	
Win	13–3	Robert Villegas	Decision (unanimous)	Bellator 20	May 27, 2010	3	5:00	San Antonio, Texas, United States	
Loss	12–3	Rafael Cavalcante	TKO (punches)	Strikeforce Challengers: Woodley vs. Bears	November 20, 2009	2	3:25	Kansas City, Kansas, United States	
Win	12–2	Anthony Ruiz	Submission (rear-naked choke)	Strikeforce Challengers: Evangelista vs. Aina	May 15, 2009	1	4:29	Fresno, California, United States	
Win	11–2	Ron Fields	TKO (punches)	Adrenaline MMA: Guida vs. Russow	June 14, 2008	2	0:34	Chicago, Illinois, United States	
Loss	10–2	Jaime Fletcher	Decision (unanimous)	ShoXC: Elite Challenger Series	March 21, 2008	3	5:00	Santa Ynez, California, United States	
Loss	10–1	Jared Hamman	Submission (rear-naked choke)	ShoXC: Elite Challenger Series	October 26, 2007	2	1:46	Santa Ynez, California, United States	
Win	10–0	Jefferson Silva	TKO (doctor stoppage)	ShoXC: Elite Challenger Series	July 27, 2007	1	5:00	Santa Ynez, California, United States	
Win	9–0	Matt Thomas	Decision (split)	World Cage Fighting 1	June 23, 2007	3	3:00	Southaven, Mississippi, United States	
Win	8–0	Corey Salter	TKO (punches)	JJL Promotions: Sudden Impact 1	February 27, 2007	3	0:10	San Antonio, Texas, United States	
Win	7–0	Jesse Vasquez	TKO (punches)	Renegades Extreme Fighting	January 20, 2007	2	0:10	Houston, Texas, United States	
Win	6–0	Anthony Trotter	TKO (punches)	NLE: Ultimate Fright Night	October 28, 2006	2	N/A	Bossier City, Louisiana, United States	
Win	5–0	Robert Masko	Decision (unanimous)	Renegades Extreme Fighting	September 30, 2006	4	5:00	Houston, Texas, United States	
Win	4–0	Lance Ramoth	Submission (rear-naked choke)	Renegades Extreme Fighting	June 17, 2006	4	0:28	Houston, Texas, United States	
Win	3–0	Patrick Miller	Submission (rear-naked choke)	Renegades Extreme Fighting	March 25, 2006	1	0:44	Houston, Texas, United States	
Win	2–0	Matt Thompson	Decision (unanimous)	Renegades Extreme Fighting	February 10, 2006	3	5:00	Austin, Texas, United States	
Win	1–0	Shane Faulkner	Decision (unanimous)	Renegades Extreme Fighting	November 5, 2005	3	5:00	Houston, Texas, United States	
