= 2007 in Elite Xtreme Combat =

Information
- First date: February 10, 2007
- Last date: November 10, 2007

Events
- Total events: 8

Fights
- Total fights: 81
- Title fights: 3

Chronology
| 2007 in Elite Xtreme Combat | 2008 in Elite XC |

The year 2007 is the 1st year in the history of the Elite Xtreme Combat, a mixed martial arts promotion based in The United States. In 2007 Elite Xtreme Combat held 8 events beginning with, EliteXC Destiny.

== Title fights ==
Title fights in 2007
| Weight class | | | | Method | Round | Time | Event | Notes |
|---|---|---|---|---|---|---|---|---|
| Middleweight | Murilo Rua | def | Joey Villasenor | KO (punches) | 2 | 1:05 | Strikeforce Shamrock vs. Baroni | (Note: For the EliteXC Middleweight Championship.) |
| Middleweight | Robbie Lawler (c) | def. | Murilo Rua (c) | KO (punches) | 3 | 2:04 | EliteXC: Uprising | (Note: For the EliteXC Middleweight Championship and ICON Sport Middleweight championships unification.) |
| Lightweight | K. J. Noons | def. | Nick Diaz | TKO (doctor stoppage) | 1 | 5:00 | EliteXC: Renegade | (Note: For the EliteXC Lightweight Championship) |

== Events list ==
| # | Event title | Date | Arena | Location |
|---|---|---|---|---|
| 8 | EliteXC: Renegade | November 10, 2007 | American Bank Center | Corpus Christi, Texas |
| 7 | ShoXC: Elite Challenger Series | October 26, 2007 | Chumash Casino Resort | Santa Ynez, California |
| 6 | EliteXC: Uprising | September 15, 2007 | Neal S. Blaisdell Arena | Oahu, Hawaii |
| 5 | ShoXC: Elite Challenger Series | August 25, 2007 | Vicksburg Convention Center | Vicksburg, Mississippi |
| 4 | ShoXC: Elite Challenger Series | July 27, 2007 | Chumash Casino Resort | Santa Ynez, California |
| 3 | Strikeforce: Shamrock vs. Baroni | June 22, 2007 | HP Pavilion | San Jose, California |
| 2 | Dynamite!! USA | June 2, 2007 | Los Angeles Memorial Coliseum | Los Angeles |
| 1 | EliteXC: Destiny | February 10, 2007 | DeSoto Civic Center | Southaven, Mississippi |

== EliteXC Destiny ==
EliteXC Destiny was an event held on February 10, 2007, at DeSoto Civic Center in Southaven, Mississippi.

=== Results ===
Main card (Showtime)
| Weight class | | | | Method | Round | Time | Notes |
|---|---|---|---|---|---|---|---|
| Middleweight | Renzo Gracie | def. | Frank Shamrock | DQ (illegal knees) | 2 | 2:00 | (Note: Shamrock was disqualified for knees to the head of a grounded opponent.) |
| Super Heavyweight | Antônio Silva | def. | Wesley Correira | TKO (flying knee and punches) | 1 | 3:49 |
| Middleweight | Joey Villasenor | def. | David Loiseau | Decision (unanimous) | 3 | 5:00 |
| Catchweight (141 lbs) | Gina Carano | def. | Julie Kedzie | Decision (unanimous) | 3 | 3:00 |
| Lightweight | Charles Bennett | def. | K. J. Noons | KO (punch) | 1 | 3:43 |
Preliminary card (Proelite.com)
| Middleweight | Riki Fukuda | def. | Chris Gates | Submission (punches) | 1 | 1:18 |
| Lightweight | James Edson Berto | def. | John Shackelford | TKO (punches) | 2 | 2:27 |
| Lightweight | Javier Vazquez | def. | Adriano Pereira | Decision (split) | 3 | 5:00 |
| Welterweight | Mike Pyle | def. | Ross Ebanez | Submission (rear naked choke) | 1 | 1:55 |
| Heavyweight | Tim Persey | def. | Bo Cantrell | KO (punches) | 1 | 1:33 |

== Dynamite!! USA ==
Dynamite!! USA was an event held on June 2, 2007, at Los Angeles Memorial Coliseum in Los Angeles.

=== Results ===
Main card (PPV)
| Weight class | | | | Method | Round | Time | Notes |
|---|---|---|---|---|---|---|---|
| Heavyweight | Brock Lesnar | def. | Min Soo Kim | Submission (punches) | 1 | 1:09 |
| Catchweight (188 lbs) | Royce Gracie | def. | Kazushi Sakuraba | Decision (unanimous) | 3 | 5:00 | (Note: Gracie tested positive for banned substances post-fight.) |
| Lightweight | Hideo Tokoro | def. | Brad Pickett | Submission (armbar) | 1 | 2:41 |
| Catchweight (192 lbs) | Yoon Dong-Sik | def. | Melvin Manhoef | Submission (armbar) | 2 | 1:17 |
| Super Heavyweight | Mighty Siliga | def. | Ruben Villareal | TKO (punches) | 1 | 1:33 |
| Catchweight (213 lbs) | Bernard Ackah | def. | Johnnie Morton | KO (punch) | 1 | 0:38 | (Note: Morton tested positive for banned substances post-fight.) |
Preliminary card (Showtime)
| Welterweight | Jake Shields | def. | Ido Pariente | Submission (rear naked choke) | 1 | 2:06 |
| Catchweight (160 lbs) | Gesias Cavalcante | def. | Nam Phan | TKO (punches) | 1 | 0:26 |
| Heavyweight | Jonathan Wiezorek | def. | Tim Persey | TKO (punches) | 2 | 0:50 | (Note: Persey tested positive for banned substances post-fight.) |
Preliminary card (unaired)
| Lightweight | Katsuhiko Nagata | def. | Isaiah Hill | Decision (split) | 3 | 5:00 |

== Strikeforce Shamrock vs. Baroni ==
Strikeforce Shamrock vs. Baroni was an event held on June 22, 2007, at The HP Pavilion in San Jose, California.

=== Results ===
Main Card
| Weight class | | | | Method | Round | Time | Notes |
|---|---|---|---|---|---|---|---|
| Middleweight | Frank Shamrock | def | Phil Baroni | submission (rear-naked choke) | 2 | 4:15 | (Note: For the Middleweight Championship.) |
| Middleweight | Murilo Rua | def | Joey Villasenor | KO (punches) | 2 | 1:05 | (Note: For the EliteXC Middleweight Championship.) |
| Middleweight | Cung Le | def | Tony Fryklund | TKO (punches) | 3 | 0:25 |
| Heavyweight | Paul Buentello | def | Carter Williams | KO (punches) | 2 | 0:10 |
| Lightweight | Josh Thomson | def | Nick Gonzalez | submission (rear-naked choke) | 1 | 1:42 |
| Welterweight | Paul Daley | def | Duane Ludwig | TKO (punches) | 2 | 0:32 |
Preliminary card
| Lightweight | David Smith | def | Sean Bassett | KO (punch) | 2 | 1:23 |
| Lightweight | James Edson Berto | def | Victor Valenzuela | submission (heel hook) | 1 | 0:47 |
| Middleweight | Nik Theotiko | def | Nikk Covert | KO (punch) | 1 | 1:13 |
| Welterweight | Mike Pyle | def | Aaron Wetherspoon | unanimous decision | 3 | 5:00 |
| Welterweight | Luke Stewart | def | Jason Von Flue | TKO (punches) | 3 | 2:17 |
| Heavyweight | Rex Richards | def | Ray Seraile | TKO (punches) | 1 | 0:35 |
| Bantamweight | Chris Cariaso | def | Anthony Figueroa | unanimous decision | 3 | 5:00 |
| Catchweight (179 lb) | Jeffrey Cachia | def | Shigeru Momoi | submission (guillotine choke) | 1 | 1:58 |
| Middleweight | Seth Kleinbeck | def | Sam Spengler | TKO (punches) | 2 | 2:55 |

== ShoXC: Elite Challenger Series ==
ShoXC: Elite Challenger Series
- Date: July 27, 2007
- Venue: Chumash Casino Resort
- City: Santa Ynez, California

ShoXC: Elite Challenger Series was an event held on July 27, 2007, at Chumash Casino Resort in Santa Ynez, California.

=== Results ===
Main Card
| Weight class | | | | Method | Round | Time | Notes |
|---|---|---|---|---|---|---|---|
| | Brian Cobb | def. | John Reedy | Submission (Rear-Naked Choke) | 1 | 4:09 |
| | Tony Rubalcava | def. | Drew Montgomery | TKO (Punches) | 1 | 4:19 |
| | Anthony Ruiz | def. | Jason Geris | TKO (Referee Stoppage) | 1 | 5:00 |
| | Josh Neal | def. | Eric Beondo | TKO (Knee) | 1 | 2:56 |
| | Shayna Baszler | def. | Jan Finney | Submission (Armbar) | 1 | 2:40 |
| | K. J. Noons | def. | Edson Berto | KO (Knee) | 3 | 0:45 |
| | Jaime Jara | def. | Jeremiah Metcalf | KO (Punch) | 1 | 4:15 |
| | Scott Jorgensen | def. | Chris David | Decision (Unanimous) | 3 | 5:00 |
| | Aaron Rosa | def. | Jefferson Silva | TKO (Doctor Stoppage) | 1 | 5:00 |
| | Muhsin Corbbrey | def. | Lee Gibson | Decision (Unanimous) | 3 | 5:00 |

== ShoXC: Elite Challenger Series ==
ShoXC: Elite Challenger Series
- Date: August 25, 2007
- Venue: Vicksburg Convention Center
- City: Vicksburg, Mississippi

ShoXC: Elite Challenger Series was an event held on August 25, 2007, at Vicksburg Convention Center in Vicksburg, Mississippi.

=== Results ===
Main Card
| Weight class | | | | Method | Round | Time | Notes |
|---|---|---|---|---|---|---|---|
| | Wes Shivers | def. | James Neely | Submission (Guillotine Choke) | 1 | 2:22 |
| | Victor Valenzuela | def. | Charles Bennett | TKO (Punches) | 1 | 3:23 |
| | Seth Kleinbeck | def. | Jaime Jara | TKO (Punch) | 2 | 4:59 |
| | Jon Murphy | def. | Dave Huckaba | KO (Punches) | 2 | 0:19 |
| | Héctor Urbina | def. | Ray Lizama | Decision (Unanimous) | 3 | 5:00 |
| | Umar Luv | def. | Brendan Tierney | Submission (Rear-Naked Choke) | 1 | 4:08 |

== EliteXC: Uprising ==
EliteXC: Uprising was an event held on September 15, 2007, at Neal S. Blaisdell Arena in Oahu, Hawaii.

=== Results ===
Main card (Showtime)
| Weight class | | | | Method | Round | Time | Notes |
|---|---|---|---|---|---|---|---|
| Middleweight | Robbie Lawler (c) | def. | Murilo Rua (c) | KO (punches) | 3 | 2:04 | (Note: For the EliteXC Middleweight Championship. and ICON Sport Middleweight championships unification.) |
| Lightweight | Nick Diaz | def. | Mike Aina | Decision (split) (30-27, 28-29, 29-28) | 3 | 5:00 |
| Catchweight (141 lbs) | Gina Carano | def. | Tonya Evinger | Submission (rear naked choke) | 1 | 2:53 |
| Middleweight | Joey Villasenor | def. | Riki Fukuda | Decision (split) (29-28, 28-29, 29-28) | 3 | 5:00 |
| Welterweight | Jake Shields | def. | Renato Verissimo | TKO (punches and elbows) | 1 | 4:00 |
Preliminary card (Proelite.com)
| Welterweight | Brandon Wolff | def. | Chad Klingensmith | Decision (unanimous) | 3 | 5:00 |
| Bantamweight | Mark Oshiro | def. | Nui Wheeler | Submission (rear naked choke) | 1 | 1:19 |
| Middleweight | Mark Kurano | def. | Jose Diaz | Submission (rear naked choke) | 1 | 1:13 |
| Middleweight | Kala Hose | def. | Jeff Fox | TKO (strikes) | 1 | 0:20 |
| Bantamweight | Tyson Nam | def. | Albert Manners | Decision (unanimous) | 3 | 5:00 |
| Lightweight | Justin Buchholz | def. | Ikaika Choy-Fu | TKO (punches) | 1 | 1:35 |
| Featherweight | Elias Delos Reyes | def. | Chico Cantiberos | Submission (armbar) | 1 | 0:52 |

== ShoXC: Elite Challenger Series ==
ShoXC: Elite Challenger Series
- Date: October 26, 2007
- Venue: Chumash Casino Resort
- City: Santa Ynez, California

ShoXC: Elite Challenger Series was an event held on October 26, 2007, at Chumash Casino Resort in Santa Ynez, California.

=== Results ===
Main Card
| Weight class | | | | Method | Round | Time | Notes |
|---|---|---|---|---|---|---|---|
| | Jared Hamman | def. | Aaron Rosa | Submission (Rear-Naked Choke) | 2 | 1:46 |
| | Javier Vazquez | def. | J.C. Pennington | Submission (Rear-Naked Choke) | 1 | 1:15 |
| | Mongkhon Wiwasuk | def. | Kaleo Kwan | Decision (Unanimous) | 3 | 5:00 |
| | Shayna Baszler | def. | Jennifer Tate | Submission (Armbar) | 1 | 0:44 |
| | Muhsin Corbbrey | def. | Robert McMasters | Submission (Guillotine Choke) | 1 | 4:59 |
| | Shane del Rosario | def. | Amedeo Viola | Submission (Triangle Choke) | 1 | 2:27 |
| | Giva Santana | def. | Jaime Fletcher | Submission (Armbar) | 1 | 2:46 |
| | Chris Cariaso | def. | Rick McCorkell | Decision (Unanimous) | 3 | 5:00 |

== EliteXC: Renegade ==
EliteXC: Renegade was an event held on November 10, 2007, at The American Bank Center in Corpus Christi, Texas.

=== Results ===
Main card (Showtime)
| Weight class | | | | Method | Round | Time | Notes |
|---|---|---|---|---|---|---|---|
| Lightweight | K. J. Noons | def. | Nick Diaz | TKO (doctor stoppage) | 1 | 5:00 | (Note: For the EliteXC Lightweight Championship) |
| Heavyweight | Kimbo Slice | def. | Bo Cantrell | Submission (strikes) | 1 | 0:19 |
| Welterweight | Jake Shields | def. | Mike Pyle | Submission (rear-naked choke) | 1 | 3:39 |
| Middleweight | Kyle Noke | def. | Seth Kleinbeck | TKO (doctor stoppage) | 2 | 4:22 |
| Heavyweight | Antônio Silva | def. | Jonathan Wiezorek | Submission (rear-naked choke) | 1 | 3:12 |
Preliminary card (Proelite.com)
| Heavyweight | Geoff Bumstead | def. | Robert Ruiz | Submission (rear-naked choke) | 1 | 1:30 |
| Lightweight | Yves Edwards | def. | Nick Gonzalez | Submission (rear-naked choke) | 1 | 3:05 |
| Middleweight | Matt Lucas | def. | Jon Kirk | Decision (unanimous) | 3 | 5:00 |
| Heavyweight | Brett Rogers | def. | Ralph Kelly | TKO (strikes) | 1 | 1:43 |
| Welterweight | Jae Suk Lim | def. | Daniel Pineda | Submission (rear-naked choke) | 1 | 2:42 |

== See also ==
- Elite Xtreme Combat
