= EliteXC: Renegade =

Elite Xtreme Combat MMA event in 2007

- The poster for EliteXC: Renegade
- Promotion: EliteXC
- Date: November 10, 2007
- Venue: American Bank Center
- City: Corpus Christi, Texas

Event chronology
EliteXC: Uprising	EliteXC: Renegade	EliteXC: Street Certified

EliteXC: Renegade was a mixed martial arts event promoted by EliteXC that took place on Saturday, November 10, 2007 at the American Bank Center in Corpus Christi, Texas. The main card aired live on Showtime.

== Background ==
The main event featured a showdown between Nick Diaz and K. J. Noons for the new EliteXC 160-pound Lightweight title.

The card also featured the EliteXC debut of Internet brawler Kevin "Kimbo Slice" Ferguson, as well as welterweight stand-out Jake Shields.

== Results ==
Main card (Showtime)
Weight class				Method	Round	Time	Notes
Lightweight	K. J. Noons	def.	Nick Diaz	TKO (doctor stoppage)	1	5:00	(Note: For the EliteXC Lightweight Championship)
Heavyweight	Kimbo Slice	def.	Bo Cantrell	TKO (Submission to strikes)	1	0:19
Welterweight	Jake Shields	def.	Mike Pyle	Submission (rear-naked choke)	1	3:39
Middleweight	Kyle Noke	def.	Seth Kleinbeck	TKO (doctor stoppage)	2	4:22
Heavyweight	Antônio Silva	def.	Jonathan Wiezorek	Submission (rear-naked choke)	1	3:12
Preliminary card (Proelite.com)
Heavyweight	Geoff Bumstead	def.	Robert Ruiz	Submission (rear-naked choke)	1	1:30
Lightweight	Yves Edwards	def.	Nick Gonzalez	Submission (rear-naked choke)	1	3:05
Middleweight	Matt Lucas	def.	Jon Kirk	Decision (unanimous)	3	5:00
Heavyweight	Brett Rogers	def.	Ralph Kelly	TKO (strikes)	1	1:43
Welterweight	Jae Suk Lim	def.	Daniel Pineda	Submission (rear-naked choke)	1	2:42

== See also ==
- Elite Xtreme Combat
- 2007 in Elite Xtreme Combat
