= EliteXC: Uprising =

Elite Xtreme Combat MMA event in 2007

- The poster for EliteXC: Uprising
- Promotion: EliteXC, Icon Sport, Rumble on the Rock
- Date: September 15, 2007
- Venue: Neal S. Blaisdell Arena
- City: Honolulu, Hawaii

Event chronology
ShoXC 2: Bennett vs. Valenzuela	EliteXC: Uprising	ShoXC 3:

EliteXC: Uprising was a mixed martial arts event promoted by EliteXC and co-promoted by Icon Sport and Rumble World Entertainment. The event took place on Saturday, September 15, 2007 at the Neal S. Blaisdell Arena in Oahu, Hawaii.

== Background ==
Following several co-promotions and the debut of ShoXC, EliteXC returned with their second official show 7 months after their debut with EliteXC: Destiny.

The main card aired on Showtime. The main event featured a middleweight unification match between EliteXC Middleweight Champion, Murilo Rua, and ICON Sport Middleweight Champion, Robbie Lawler.

In a rare move for MMA, the untelevised matches occurred after the main card and streamed live on the Proelite.com website.

== Results ==
Main card (Showtime)
Weight class				Method	Round	Time	Notes
Middleweight	Robbie Lawler (c)	def.	Murilo Rua (c)	KO (punches)	3	2:04	(Note: EliteXC and ICON Sport Middleweight championships unification)
Lightweight	Nick Diaz	def.	Mike Aina	Decision (split) (30-27, 28-29, 29-28)	3	5:00
Catchweight (141 lbs)	Gina Carano	def.	Tonya Evinger	Submission (rear naked choke)	1	2:53
Middleweight	Joey Villasenor	def.	Riki Fukuda	Decision (split) (29-28, 28-29, 29-28)	3	5:00
Welterweight	Jake Shields	def.	Renato Verissimo	TKO (punches and elbows)	1	4:00
Preliminary card (Proelite.com)
Welterweight	Brandon Wolff	def.	Chad Klingensmith	Decision (unanimous)	3	5:00
Bantamweight	Mark Oshiro	def.	Nui Wheeler	Submission (rear naked choke)	1	1:19
Middleweight	Mark Kurano	def.	Jose Diaz	Submission (rear naked choke)	1	1:13
Middleweight	Kala Hose	def.	Jeff Fox	TKO (strikes)	1	0:20
Bantamweight	Tyson Nam	def.	Albert Manners	Decision (unanimous)	3	5:00
Lightweight	Justin Buchholz	def.	Ikaika Choy-Fu	TKO (punches)	1	1:35
Featherweight	Elias Delos Reyes	def.	Chico Cantiberos	Submission (armbar)	1	0:52

== See also ==
- Elite Xtreme Combat
- 2007 in Elite Xtreme Combat
