= Table Mountain Rancheria =

Native American tribe

Coordinates: 36°59′06″N 119°38′09″W

Total population
- 140–160 enrolled members 11 reservation population

Regions with significant populations
- United States (California)

Languages
- English, Yokuts language

Religion
- traditional tribal religion, Christianity

Related ethnic groups
- other Yokuts and Monache tribes

The Table Mountain Rancheria is a federally recognized tribe of Native American people from the Chukchansi band of Yokuts and the Monache tribe. It is also the tribe's ranchería, located in Fresno County, California.

== Reservation ==
Founded in 1916, the Table Mountain Rancheria is 61 acres (250,000 m^{2}) large and in Fresno County, near Friant, California. The reservation population is approximately eleven people, with 34 tribal members living in the general area.

Table Mountain Rancheria Sky view. Picture Taken by Nathan Mechikoff

== Government ==
The tribe's headquarters is in Friant, and their tribal chairperson is Michelle Heredia-Cordova.

Table Mountain Rancheria Sunset. Picture Taken by Nathan Mechikoff

Table Mountain Rancheria 2024 Pow-Wow participants. Picture Taken by Nathan Mechikoff

== Cultural Resources ==
The Cultural Resources Department was formed in 1997 as a division of the Table Mountain Rancheria Tribal Government in part to help develop a Cultural Center and Museum, and record and preserve oral history, language and stories. The Museum Collections at Table Mountain Rancheria began when Tribal Elders from the area would occasionally bring up baskets to Tribal Council to sell. Over the last century and a half, many items with recognized connections to Tribal heritage and history have ended up in private collections, and the Tribe has worked to return as many pieces as possible back to Tribal custodianship as possible.

Since 1996, this collection of Native American art has grown to include baskets from over 20 different Tribes or Tribal groups in California. As of 2025, work was under way to complete traditional village exhibits on our Native Plant Trail, developed in partnership with the Tribal Youth Council.

Table Mountain Rancheria Casino Main Entrance as seen from next to the waterfall. Picture Taken by Nathan Mechikoff

== Language ==
Haw lesh ma’ and Munahoo are standard greetings from two distinctly different Native American languages at Table Mountain Rancheria. The old language, Gashowu, is a dialect of the Yokuts language, similar to Tachi and Chukchansi. The Mono language is also spoken here.

== Economic development ==
The tribe owns and operates Table Mountain Casino and Resort and Eagle Springs Golf Course, both in Friant. Table Mountain Casino Resort includes a casino, twelve story hotel, Eagle's Landing Steakhouse, Sukai Teppanyaki restaurant (above the hotel tower), Blue Oak Grille, Native Gathering Grounds coffee shop, and a few fast service restaurants all in a single building.

On July 21, 2022, the new Table Mountain Casino and Resort opened to the public. The old casino building is planned to be used as employee offices.

Table Mountain Rancheria 2025 Pow-Wow. Picture Taken by Nathan Mechikoff

Table Mountain Rancheria Casino Main Valet. Picture Taken by Nathan Mechikoff
