= EliteXC: Destiny =

Elite Xtreme Combat MMA event in 2007

- The poster for EliteXC: Destiny
- Promotion: EliteXC
- Date: February 10, 2007
- Venue: DeSoto Civic Center
- City: Southaven, Mississippi
- Attendance: 7,200

Event chronology
N/A	EliteXC: Destiny	ShoXC 1: Noons vs. Berto

EliteXC: Destiny was the inaugural mixed martial arts event by the mixed martial arts organization EliteXC. The event took place on Saturday, February 10, 2007, at the DeSoto Civic Center in Southaven, Mississippi. The main card aired on Showtime, with the undercard was streamed live on the Proelite.com website.

== History ==
The first EliteXC event ("Destiny") was announced unnamed on November 13, 2006. The fight card was finalized with less than one month to go before the debut event. The televised portion of the fight card included the return of MMA veterans Frank Shamrock and Renzo Gracie in the main event. The show also featured the first female MMA event aired live on television between Gina Carano and Julie Kedzie.

The undercard of EliteXC Destiny was streamed free of charge on Proelite.com and ivtasp.com starting at 7 p.m. EST. Heavy site traffic stopped a number of fans from viewing the fight, but many others were able to successfully view the event. As well, an "online chat" that was displayed under the message board, but numerous users complained in various message boards that their comments were not getting through and that the comments that were getting through were either "plants" or hand-selected to be pro-EliteXC.

The event drew a 1.62 household rating on Showtime.

== Results ==
Main card (Showtime)
Weight class				Method	Round	Time	Notes
Middleweight	Renzo Gracie	def.	Frank Shamrock	DQ (illegal knees)	2	2:00	(Note: Shamrock was disqualified for knees to the head of a grounded opponent.)
Super Heavyweight	Antônio Silva	def.	Wesley Correira	TKO (flying knee and punches)	1	3:49
Middleweight	Joey Villasenor	def.	David Loiseau	Decision (unanimous)	3	5:00
Catchweight (141 lbs)	Gina Carano	def.	Julie Kedzie	Decision (unanimous)	3	3:00
Lightweight	Charles Bennett	def.	K. J. Noons	KO (punch)	1	3:43
Preliminary card (Proelite.com)
Middleweight	Riki Fukuda	def.	Chris Gates	TKO (Submission to punches)	1	1:18
Lightweight	James Edson Berto	def.	John Shackelford	TKO (punches)	2	2:27
Lightweight	Javier Vazquez	def.	Adriano Pereira	Decision (split)	3	5:00
Welterweight	Mike Pyle	def.	Ross Ebanez	Submission (rear naked choke)	1	1:55
Heavyweight	Tim Persey	def.	Bo Cantrell	KO (punches)	1	1:33

== See also ==
- Elite Xtreme Combat
- 2007 in Elite Xtreme Combat
