= Friant, California =

Friant
- Unincorporated Community; Census Designated Place
- Location in Fresno County and the state of California

- Location in the United States
- Coordinates: 36°59′16″N 119°42′43″W
- Country: United States
- State: California
- County: Fresno

Government
  - State Senator: Shannon Grove (R)
  - State Assembly: David Tangipa (R)
  - U. S. Congress: Vince Fong (R)

Area
  - Total: 1.301 sq mi (3.370 km^{2})
  - Land: 1.251 sq mi (3.240 km^{2})
  - Water: 0.051 sq mi (0.131 km^{2}) 3.88%
- Elevation: 344 ft (105 m)

Population (2020)
  - Total: 446
  - Density: 357/sq mi (138/km^{2})
- Time zone: UTC-8 (PST)
  - Summer (DST): UTC-7 (PDT)
- ZIP code: 93626
- Area code: 559
- FIPS code: 06-27014
- GNIS feature IDs: 223946, 2408265

Friant (formerly, Converse Ferry, Jones Ferry, Hamptonville, and Pollasky) is a census-designated place (CDP) in Fresno County, California, United States. The population was 446 at the 2020 census, down from 549 at the 2010 census. Friant is located 11.5 miles (19 km) north of Clovis, at an elevation of 344 feet (105 m).

== Geography ==
The CDP is located along the banks of the San Joaquin River and at the base of Friant Dam and Millerton Lake.

According to the United States Census Bureau, the CDP has a total area of 1.3 square miles (3.4 km^{2}), of which 96.1% is land and 3.9% is water.

== Climate ==
Friant has a hot-summer Mediterranean climate (Csa) typical of California's Central Valley with hot, dry summers and cool, rainier winters.

Climate data for Friant Government Camp, California (1991–2020 normals, extremes 1912–present)
Month	Jan	Feb	Mar	Apr	May	Jun	Jul	Aug	Sep	Oct	Nov	Dec	Year
Record high °F (°C)	78 (26)	81 (27)	91 (33)	99 (37)	108 (42)	117 (47)	116 (47)	115 (46)	114 (46)	105 (41)	92 (33)	79 (26)	117 (47)
Mean maximum °F (°C)	69.3 (20.7)	73.0 (22.8)	80.0 (26.7)	89.8 (32.1)	99.2 (37.3)	106.3 (41.3)	108.4 (42.4)	107.9 (42.2)	103.8 (39.9)	94.8 (34.9)	81.0 (27.2)	69.0 (20.6)	110.0 (43.3)
Mean daily maximum °F (°C)	55.9 (13.3)	60.9 (16.1)	66.3 (19.1)	72.9 (22.7)	82.8 (28.2)	91.9 (33.3)	98.7 (37.1)	97.9 (36.6)	91.8 (33.2)	80.3 (26.8)	66.1 (18.9)	56.0 (13.3)	76.8 (24.9)
Daily mean °F (°C)	46.9 (8.3)	50.6 (10.3)	54.4 (12.4)	58.3 (14.6)	66.3 (19.1)	73.9 (23.3)	80.2 (26.8)	79.1 (26.2)	74.2 (23.4)	65.1 (18.4)	54.1 (12.3)	46.4 (8.0)	62.5 (16.9)
Mean daily minimum °F (°C)	38.0 (3.3)	40.4 (4.7)	42.5 (5.8)	43.6 (6.4)	49.8 (9.9)	55.8 (13.2)	61.6 (16.4)	60.3 (15.7)	56.7 (13.7)	49.8 (9.9)	42.2 (5.7)	36.9 (2.7)	48.1 (9.0)
Mean minimum °F (°C)	28.0 (−2.2)	31.5 (−0.3)	33.7 (0.9)	34.5 (1.4)	41.3 (5.2)	46.2 (7.9)	54.2 (12.3)	53.5 (11.9)	47.0 (8.3)	40.3 (4.6)	32.6 (0.3)	28.3 (−2.1)	25.6 (−3.6)
Record low °F (°C)	17 (−8)	19 (−7)	24 (−4)	24 (−4)	30 (−1)	35 (2)	45 (7)	38 (3)	36 (2)	29 (−2)	21 (−6)	16 (−9)	16 (−9)
Average precipitation inches (mm)	3.11 (79)	2.48 (63)	2.49 (63)	1.36 (35)	0.51 (13)	0.17 (4.3)	0.01 (0.25)	0.01 (0.25)	0.07 (1.8)	0.75 (19)	1.21 (31)	2.49 (63)	14.66 (372.6)
Average precipitation days	10.2	9.3	8.1	5.1	3.1	0.9	0.4	0.2	1.0	3.0	6.0	8.6	55.9
Source: NOAA

== History ==
The place was first called Converse Ferry for Charles Converse, who established a ferry across the San Joaquin River in 1852. It was renamed Jones Ferry for J.R. Jones, a local merchant. The post office came in 1881 and named the place Hamptonville, after William R. Hampton, its first postmaster. The Southern Pacific Railroad arrived in 1891 and named the place Pollasky for Marcus Pollasky, a railroad official. In the 1920s the place was renamed for Thomas Friant, a lumber company executive.

- Unknown Date: Mugginsville
- 1852-≤1863: Converse Ferry or Converse
- ≤1863-1881: Jones Ferry or Jonesville
- 1881-1891: Hamptonville
- 1891-1907: Pollasky
- 1907–present: Friant

== Demographics ==
Historical population
Census	Pop.	Note	%±
2000	778		—
2010	509		−34.6%
2020	446		−12.4%
U.S. Decennial Census; 1860–1870 1880-1890; 1900 1910 1920; 1930 1940 1950; 1960 1970 1980; 1990 2000 2010

Friant first appeared as a census designated place in the 2000 U.S. census.

=== 2020 ===
The 2020 United States census reported that Friant had a population of 446. The population density was 356.5 inhabitants per square mile (137.6/km^{2}). The racial makeup of Friant was 319 (71.5%) White, 5 (1.1%) African American, 14 (3.1%) Native American, 9 (2.0%) Asian, 0 (0.0%) Pacific Islander, 19 (4.3%) from other races, and 80 (17.9%) from two or more races. Hispanic or Latino of any race were 82 persons (18.4%).

The whole population lived in households. There were 216 households, out of which 32 (14.8%) had children under the age of 18 living in them, 117 (54.2%) were married-couple households, 8 (3.7%) were cohabiting couple households, 42 (19.4%) had a female householder with no partner present, and 49 (22.7%) had a male householder with no partner present. 57 households (26.4%) were one person, and 31 (14.4%) were one person aged 65 or older. The average household size was 2.06. There were 151 families (69.9% of all households).

The age distribution was 45 people (10.1%) under the age of 18, 22 people (4.9%) aged 18 to 24, 88 people (19.7%) aged 25 to 44, 129 people (28.9%) aged 45 to 64, and 162 people (36.3%) who were 65 years of age or older. The median age was 58.6 years. For every 100 females, there were 100.0 males.

There were 249 housing units at an average density of 199.0 units per square mile (76.8 units/km^{2}), of which 216 (86.7%) were occupied. Of these, 170 (78.7%) were owner-occupied, and 46 (21.3%) were occupied by renters.

=== 2010 ===
At the 2010 census Friant had a population of 509. The population density was 383.9 inhabitants per square mile (148.2/km^{2}). The racial makeup of Friant was 433 (85.1%) White, 4 (0.8%) African American, 14 (2.8%) Native American, 7 (1.4%) Asian, 0 (0.0%) Pacific Islander, 11 (2.2%) from other races, and 40 (7.9%) from two or more races. Hispanic or Latino of any race were 63 people (12.4%).

The whole population lived in households, no one lived in non-institutionalized group quarters and no one was institutionalized.

There were 224 households, 47 (21.0%) had children under the age of 18 living in them, 111 (49.6%) were opposite-sex married couples living together, 21 (9.4%) had a female householder with no husband present, 9 (4.0%) had a male householder with no wife present. There were 12 (5.4%) unmarried opposite-sex partnerships, and 5 (2.2%) same-sex married couples or partnerships. 61 households (27.2%) were one person and 33 (14.7%) had someone living alone who was 65 or older. The average household size was 2.27. There were 141 families (62.9% of households); the average family size was 2.75.

The age distribution was 83 people (16.3%) under the age of 18, 35 people (6.9%) aged 18 to 24, 82 people (16.1%) aged 25 to 44, 169 people (33.2%) aged 45 to 64, and 140 people (27.5%) who were 65 or older. The median age was 51.8 years. For every 100 females, there were 111.2 males. For every 100 females age 18 and over, there were 110.9 males.

There were 252 housing units at an average density of 190.1 per square mile (73.4/km^{2}), of which 224 were occupied, 171 (76.3%) by the owners and 53 (23.7%) by renters. The homeowner vacancy rate was 5.5%; the rental vacancy rate was 8.6%. 381 people (74.9% of the population) lived in owner-occupied housing units and 128 people (25.1%) lived in rental housing units.

== Education ==
The CDP is served by the Clovis Unified School District.

Friant is zoned to Kastner Intermediate Elementary School and Clovis West High School.

As of 2016 it was zoned to Liberty Elementary School, which at the time fed into Kastner and Clovis West.
