= Santa Ynez, California =

Santa Ynez, California 'alaxulapu (Sʰamala/Ineseño Chumash)
- unincorporated community census-designated place
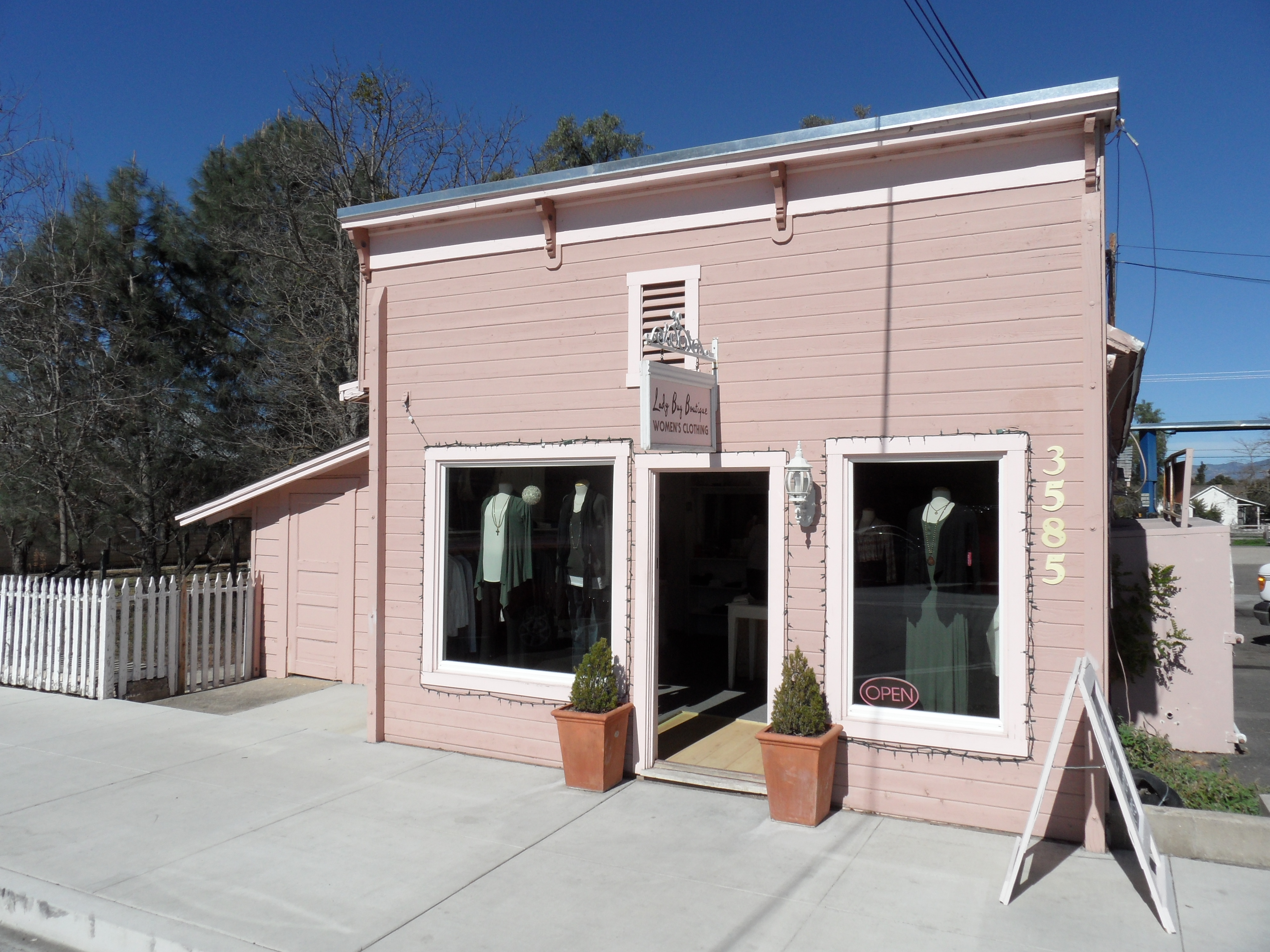
- A boutique with western-style architectural details

- Location in Santa Barbara County and the state of California

- Location in Southern California Location in California Location in the United States
- Coordinates: 34°36′43″N 120°5′18″W
- Country: United States
- State: California
- County: Santa Barbara

Government
  - State Senate: Monique Limón (D)
  - State Assembly: Gregg Hart (D)
  - U. S. Congress: Salud Carbajal (D)

Area
  - Total: 4.837 sq mi (12.528 km^{2})
  - Land: 4.830 sq mi (12.510 km^{2})
  - Water: 0.0069 sq mi (0.018 km^{2}) 0.14%
- Elevation: 607 ft (185 m)

Population (2020)
  - Total: 4,505
  - Density: 932.7/sq mi (360.1/km^{2})
- Time zone: UTC-8 (PST)
  - Summer (DST): UTC-7 (PDT)
- ZIP code: 93460
- Area code: 805
- FIPS code: 06-70182
- GNIS feature ID: 1661407

Santa Ynez (/ɪˈnɛz/ ee-NEZ; Spanish for "St. Agnes", originally spelled Santa Inés) is an unincorporated community in the Santa Ynez Valley of Santa Barbara County, California, United States.

The population was 4,505 at the 2020 census, up from 4,418 at the 2010 census. For statistical purposes, the United States Census Bureau has defined Santa Ynez as a census-designated place (CDP). Santa Ynez is the archaic spelling of Santa Inés in Spanish, meaning Saint Agnes. The Santa Ynez Airport is general aviation with a paved 2,804-by-75-foot (855 m × 23 m) runway.

== Geography ==
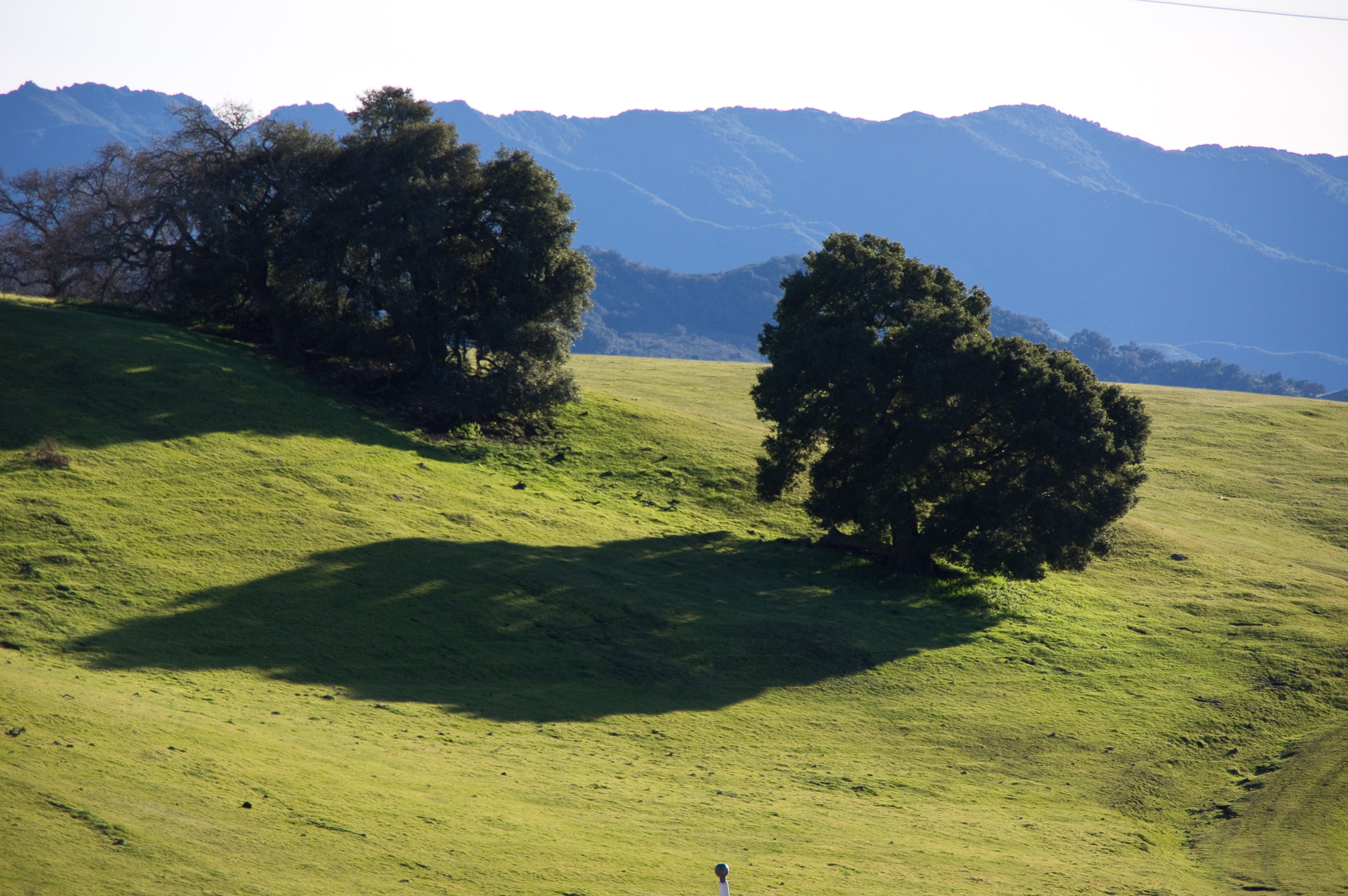
Santa Ynez, CA

Santa Ynez is located at 34°36′43″N 120°5′18″W.

According to the United States Census Bureau, the CDP has a total area of 4.8 square miles (12 km^{2}), 99.86% of it land, and 0.14% of it covered by water. Santa Ynez is located about 40 miles (64 km) north of Santa Barbara, California, and is known for its world-class wineries.

== Climate ==
This region experiences warm (but not hot) and dry summers, with no average monthly temperatures above 71.6 °F (22.0 °C). According to the Köppen Climate Classification system, Santa Ynez has a warm-summer Mediterranean climate, abbreviated Csb on climate maps.

== Demographics ==
Historical population
Census	Pop.	Note	%±
1980	3,335		—
1990	4,200		25.9%
2000	4,584		9.1%
2010	4,418		−3.6%
2020	4,505		2.0%
U.S. Decennial Census; 1860–1870 1880-1890; 1900 1910 1920; 1930 1940 1950; 1960 1970 1980; 1990 2000 2010; 2020

Santa Ynez first appeared as a census designated place in the 1980 U.S. census.

=== Racial and ethnic composition ===
Santa Ynez CDP, California – Racial and ethnic composition Note: the US Census treats Hispanic/Latino as an ethnic category. This table excludes Latinos from the racial categories and assigns them to a separate category. Hispanics/Latinos may be of any race.
Race / Ethnicity (NH = Non-Hispanic)	Pop 2000	Pop 2010	Pop 2020	% 2000	% 2010	% 2020
White alone (NH)	3,977	3,469	3,433	86.76%	78.52%	76.20%
Black or African American alone (NH)	8	9	33	0.17%	0.20%	0.73%
Native American or Alaska Native alone (NH)	32	153	42	0.70%	3.46%	0.93%
Asian alone (NH)	57	49	54	1.24%	1.11%	1.20%
Native Hawaiian or Pacific Islander alone (NH)	1	4	2	0.02%	0.09%	0.04%
Other race alone (NH)	10	7	23	0.22%	0.16%	0.51%
Mixed race or Multiracial (NH)	77	88	187	1.68%	1.99%	4.15%
Hispanic or Latino (any race)	422	639	731	9.21%	14.46%	16.23%
Total	4,584	4,418	4,505	100.00%	100.00%	100.00%

=== 2020 census ===
As of the 2020 census, Santa Ynez had a population of 4,505. The population density was 932.7 inhabitants per square mile (360.1/km^{2}). 90.7% of residents lived in urban areas, while 9.3% lived in rural areas.

The racial makeup of Santa Ynez was 80.0% White, 0.7% African American, 1.5% Native American, 1.3% Asian, 0.1% Pacific Islander, 4.6% from other races, and 11.7% from two or more races. Hispanic or Latino of any race were 16.2% of the population.

The census reported that 98.7% of the population lived in households, 1.3% lived in non-institutionalized group quarters, and no one was institutionalized. There were 1,762 households, of which 25.0% had children under the age of 18 living in them. Of all households, 60.7% were married-couple households, 5.7% were cohabiting couple households, 13.0% had a male householder and no spouse or partner present, and 20.7% had a female householder and no spouse or partner present. 21.9% of all households were made up of individuals, and 12.6% had someone living alone who was 65 years of age or older. The average household size was 2.52, and there were 1,281 families (72.7% of all households).

The age distribution was 17.9% under the age of 18, 6.3% aged 18 to 24, 17.7% aged 25 to 44, 30.4% aged 45 to 64, and 27.7% who were 65 years of age or older. The median age was 51.9 years. For every 100 females, there were 97.4 males, and for every 100 females age 18 and over there were 95.1 males age 18 and over.

There were 1,863 housing units at an average density of 385.7 units per square mile (148.9 units/km^{2}), of which 1,762 (94.6%) were occupied. Of occupied units, 72.4% were owner-occupied and 27.6% were occupied by renters. 5.4% of housing units were vacant. The homeowner vacancy rate was 0.2% and the rental vacancy rate was 0.8%.

=== 2010 census ===
At the 2010 census Santa Ynez had a population of 4,418. The population density was 859.0 inhabitants per square mile (331.7/km^{2}). The racial makeup of Santa Ynez was 3,797 (85.9%) White, 12 (0.3%) African American, 234 (5.3%) Native American, 51 (1.2%) Asian, 4 (0.1%) Pacific Islander, 147 (3.3%) from other races, and 173 (3.9%) from two or more races. Hispanic or Latino of any race were 639 people (14.5%).

The whole population lived in households, no one lived in non-institutionalized group quarters and no one was institutionalized.

There were 1,741 households, 524 (30.1%) had children under the age of 18 living in them, 1,052 (60.4%) were opposite-sex married couples living together, 137 (7.9%) had a female householder with no husband present, 81 (4.7%) had a male householder with no wife present. There were 82 (4.7%) unmarried opposite-sex partnerships, and 18 (1.0%) same-sex married couples or partnerships. 367 households (21.1%) were one person and 186 (10.7%) had someone living alone who was 65 or older. The average household size was 2.54. There were 1,270 families (72.9% of households); the average family size was 2.91.

The age distribution was 916 people (20.7%) under the age of 18, 280 people (6.3%) aged 18 to 24, 785 people (17.8%) aged 25 to 44, 1,559 people (35.3%) aged 45 to 64, and 878 people (19.9%) who were 65 or older. The median age was 47.8 years. For every 100 females, there were 96.3 males. For every 100 females age 18 and over, there were 91.7 males.

There were 1,886 housing units at an average density of 366.7 square miles (950 km^{2}), of which 1,327 (76.2%) were owner-occupied, and 414 (23.8%) were occupied by renters. The homeowner vacancy rate was 1.3%; the rental vacancy rate was 11.3%. 3,434 people (77.7% of the population) lived in owner-occupied housing units and 984 people (22.3%) lived in rental housing units.

=== Income and poverty ===
In 2023, the US Census Bureau estimated that the median household income was $117,500, and the per capita income was $64,240. About 9.1% of families and 11.3% of the population were below the poverty line.

=== Community ===
The Santa Ynez Band of Chumash Mission Indians, a federally recognized Chumash tribe is headquartered in Santa Ynez. They operate the local Chumash Casino Resort.

== Government ==
In the California State Legislature, Santa Ynez is in the 21st senatorial district, represented by Democrat Monique Limón, and in the 37th Assembly district, represented by Democrat Gregg Hart.

In the United States House of Representatives, Santa Ynez is in California's 24th congressional district, represented by Democrat Salud Carbajal.

== Notable people ==
- Jan Barrett (1939–1973) – American Football League player
- Tyler Boyd (born 1994) – soccer player who represented the United States national team
- John Corbett (born 1961) – actor and country music singer
- Bob Falkenburg (1926–2022) – tennis player and entrepreneur
- John Forsythe (1918–2010) – stage and film/television actor, producer, and narrator
- Ed Fitz Gerald (1924–2020) – Major League Baseball (MLB) player
- Marty Paich (1925–1995) – pianist, composer, arranger, record producer, music director, and conductor
- Ralph Story (1920–2006) – television and radio personality

== See also ==
- Neverland Ranch
- Lake Cachuma
- California State Route 154
- Rancho del Cielo
