= Jessica-Rose Clark =

Australian mixed martial artist

- Born: Jessica-Rose Clark; 28 November 1987 (age 38); Cairns, Queensland, Australia
- Other names: Jessy Jess
- Height: 5 ft 5 in (1.65 m)
- Weight: 135 lb (61 kg; 9.6 st)
- Division: Flyweight (2018); Bantamweight (2013–2017, 2019–present); Featherweight (2012–2013)
- Reach: 64.5 in (164 cm)
- Style: Brazilian jiu-jitsu
- Team: Integrated MMA (2012–2014); Igor MMA (2016); Australian Top Team (2016); Syndicate MMA (2016–2018); Combat Sports Academy (2018–2023); Team Ferreira BJJ (2023–present)
- Rank: Purple Belt in Brazilian Jiu-Jitsu
- Years active: 2012–present

Kickboxing record
- Total: 5
- Wins: 5
- Losses: 0

Mixed martial arts record
- Total: 21
- Wins: 11
- By knockout: 3
- By submission: 2
- By decision: 6
- Losses: 9
- By submission: 3
- By decision: 6
- No contests: 1

Other information
- Mixed martial arts record from Sherdog

Jessica-Rose Clark (born 28 November 1987) is an Australian mixed martial artist who competes in the women's Bantamweight division. She formerly competed in the Ultimate Fighting Championship (UFC).

== Background ==
Clark was born in Cairns, Australia, as the eldest of nine children. Her ailing single mother took care of the children while living on the road in a van and communities. Jessica-Rose attended regular school for the first time in the fifth grade when the family settled in North Queensland. She attended university after graduating from high school, but dropped out during the first semester. After dropping out, she found kickboxing and gradually started training mixed martial arts.

== Mixed martial arts career ==
=== Early career ===
Clark made her professional MMA debut in December 2012 in her native Australia. She fought six times over the next two years for various regional promotions, amassing a record of 5 wins and 1 loss.

=== Invicta FC ===
After taking nearly a year off from the sport, Clark made her debut with Invicta FC in July 2015. She faced Pannie Kianzad at Invicta FC 13: Cyborg vs. Van Duin and lost the bout via unanimous decision.

Clark returned to the promotion in November 2016 to face Pam Sorenson at Invicta FC 20: Evinger vs. Kunitskaya. She lost the bout via split decision.

Clark was scheduled to face Vanessa Porto at Invicta FC 26 in December 2017; however, she was removed from the card when she was tabbed by the UFC as a replacement.

=== Ultimate Fighting Championship ===
Clark made her UFC debut against Bec Rawlings in a flyweight bout, replacing Joanne Calderwood at UFC Fight Night: Werdum vs. Tybura on 19 November 2017. At the weigh-ins, Clark weighed in at 128 pounds, 2 pounds over the flyweight upper limit of 126 pounds. The bout proceeded at a catchweight and Clark forfeited 20% of her purse to Rawlings. Clark won the fight via split decision.

Clark faced Paige VanZant on 14 January 2018 at UFC Fight Night: Stephens vs. Choi. She won the fight via unanimous decision.

Clark faced Jessica Eye on 23 June 2018 at UFC Fight Night 132. She lost the fight via unanimous decision.

Clark was expected to face Andrea Lee on 15 December 2018 at UFC on Fox 31. However, Clark was forced out of the bout as she was hospitalized due to weight cutting issues and deemed medically unfit to compete by UFC physicians. As a result, the bout was cancelled.

Clark was scheduled to face Talita Bernardo on 11 May 2019 at UFC 237. However, it was reported on 3 April 2019 that Clark had pulled out of the bout, citing injury.

=== Return to bantamweight ===
Clark faced Pannie Kianzad on 9 November 2019 at UFC on ESPN+ 21. She lost the fight via unanimous decision.

Clark faced Sarah Alpar on 19 September 2020 at UFC Fight Night 178 She won the fight via a technical knockout in round three. In the fight she tore her Anterior cruciate ligament, which prevented her from fighting until mid 2021.

After recovering from the surgery, Clark returned after a year to face Joselyne Edwards at UFC Fight Night 196 on 23 October 2021. Clark won the fight via unanimous decision.

Clark faced Stephanie Egger on 19 February 2022, at UFC Fight Night 201. She lost the fight via an armbar submission in the first round.

Clark faced Julija Stoliarenko on 2 July 2022, at UFC 276. She lost the bout via armbar submission less than one minute into round one, dislocating her elbow.

Clark faced Tainara Lisboa on 13 May 2023, at UFC on ABC 4. She lost the bout via rear‐naked choke in third round. The fight was the final fight on her contract and she was not offered a new contract.

== Dirty Boxing Career ==
Clark made her debut in Mike Perry's "Dirty Boxing Championships" promotion on 14 June 2025, at Dirty Boxing Championship 2, facing Marilia Morais. She won the fight by unanimous decision

Clark faced Claudia Zamora at Dirty Boxing Championship 2, on 29 August 2025, winning via unanimous decision.

== Championships and accomplishments ==
- WCK Muay Thai Champion
- Unarmed Combat Unleashed
  - UCU Women's Bantamweight Championship (one time; only; former)
- Xtreme Fighting Championships
  - XFC Australia Bantamweight Championship (one time; former)
- Roshambo MMA
  - Roshambo Women's Bantamweight Championship (one time; only; former)

== Mixed martial arts record ==
Professional record breakdown
21 matches	11 wins	9 losses
By knockout	3	0
By submission	2	3
By decision	6	6
No contests	1	

Res.	Record	Opponent	Method	Event	Date	Round	Time	Location	Notes
Loss	11–9 (1)	Tainara Lisboa	Submission (rear-naked choke)	UFC on ABC: Rozenstruik vs. Almeida	13 May 2023	3	4:20	Charlotte, North Carolina, United States	
Loss	11–8 (1)	Julija Stoliarenko	Submission (armbar)	UFC 276	2 July 2022	1	0:42	Las Vegas, Nevada, United States	
Loss	11–7 (1)	Stephanie Egger	Submission (armbar)	UFC Fight Night: Walker vs. Hill	19 February 2022	1	3:44	Las Vegas, Nevada, United States	
Win	11–6 (1)	Joselyne Edwards	Decision (unanimous)	UFC Fight Night: Costa vs. Vettori	23 October 2021	3	5:00	Las Vegas, Nevada, United States	
Win	10–6 (1)	Sarah Alpar	TKO (punch and knee)	UFC Fight Night: Covington vs. Woodley	19 September 2020	3	4:21	Las Vegas, Nevada, United States	
Loss	9–6 (1)	Pannie Kianzad	Decision (unanimous)	UFC Fight Night: Magomedsharipov vs. Kattar	9 November 2019	3	5:00	Moscow, Russia	Return to Bantamweight.
Loss	9–5 (1)	Jessica Eye	Decision (unanimous)	UFC Fight Night: Cowboy vs. Edwards	23 June 2018	3	5:00	Kallang, Singapore	
Win	9–4 (1)	Paige VanZant	Decision (unanimous)	UFC Fight Night: Stephens vs. Choi	14 January 2018	3	5:00	St. Louis, Missouri, United States	
Win	8–4 (1)	Bec Rawlings	Decision (split)	UFC Fight Night: Werdum vs. Tybura	19 November 2017	3	5:00	Sydney, Australia	Return to Flyweight; Clark missed weight (128 lb).
Win	7–4 (1)	Carina Damm	Decision (split)	Titan FC 45: Araujo vs. Capitulino	18 August 2017	3	5:00	Pembroke Pines, Florida, United States	
Loss	6–4 (1)	Sarah Kaufman	Decision (unanimous)	Battlefield Fighting Championships	18 March 2017	3	5:00	Seoul, South Korea	
Loss	6–3 (1)	Pam Sorenson	Decision (split)	Invicta FC 20: Evinger vs. Kunitskaya	18 November 2016	3	5:00	Kansas City, Missouri, United States	
Win	6–2 (1)	Janay Harding	Decision (unanimous)	Eternal MMA 19	30 July 2016	3	5:00	Gold Coast, Australia	Return to Bantamweight.
NC	5–2 (1)	Emiko Raika	NC (overturned)	TTF Challenge 05	23 September 2015	3	5:00	Tokyo, Japan	Flyweight debut; overturned due to Clark missing weight (131 lb).
Loss	5–2	Pannie Kianzad	Decision (unanimous)	Invicta FC 13: Cyborg vs. Van Duin	9 July 2015	3	5:00	Las Vegas, Nevada, United States	
Win	5–1	Rhiannon Thompson	Decision (unanimous)	Roshambo MMA 3	26 July 2014	5	5:00	Chandler, Australia	Won the inaugural Roshambo MMA Bantamweight Championship.
Win	4–1	Kate Da Silva	TKO (punches)	XFC Australia 21	14 June 2014	2	4:07	Brisbane, Australia	Won the vacant XFC Australia Bantamweight Championship.
Win	3–1	Zoie Shreiweis	Submission (rear-naked choke)	Unarmed Combat Unleashed 2	8 February 2014	1	1:33	Emerald, Australia	Won the inaugural UCU Women's Bantamweight Championship.
Loss	2–1	Kyra Purcell	Decision (unanimous)	Fightworld Cup 16	16 November 2013	3	5:00	Nerang, Australia	Bantamweight debut. For the FWC Bantamweight Championship.
Win	2–0	Arlene Blencowe	Submission (rear-naked choke)	Nitro MMA 9	13 July 2013	2	3:38	Logan City, Australia	
Win	1–0	Mae-Lin Leow	TKO (punches)	Brace for War MMA 18	21 December 2012	3	2:17	Canberra, Australia	Featherweight debut.

== Dirty Boxing Record ==
Professional record breakdown
2 matches	2 wins	0 losses
By decision	2	0

Res.	Record	Opponent	Method	Event	Date	Round	Time	Location	Notes
Win	2-0	Claudia Zamora	Decision (Unanimous)	Dirty Boxing Championship 3	August 29, 2025	3	3:00	The Hangar at Regatta Harbour, Miami, Florida, USA	
Win	1-0	Marilia Morais	Decision (Unanimous)	Dirty Boxing Championship 2	June 14, 2025	3	3:00	The Hangar at Regatta Harbour, Miami, Florida, USA	Dirty Boxing Debut
