= Shanna Young =

American mixed martial arts fighter

- Born: Shanna Marie Young; February 20, 1991 (age 35); Salem, Virginia, United States
- Other names: The Shanimal
- Nationality: American
- Height: 5 ft 7 in (1.70 m)
- Weight: 135 lb (61 kg; 9 st 9 lb)
- Division: Bantamweight; Flyweight
- Reach: 65.0 in (165 cm)
- Team: Tuco O Tapa (formerly); Knoxville Martial Arts Academy (2014–2022); Syndicate MMA (2022–present)
- Rank: Black belt in karate Blue belt in Brazilian jiu-jitsu
- Years active: 2015–present

Mixed martial arts record
- Total: 20
- Wins: 11
- By knockout: 3
- By submission: 3
- By decision: 5
- Losses: 9
- By knockout: 1
- By submission: 1
- By decision: 7

Other information
- Mixed martial arts record from Sherdog

Shanna Marie Leonard Young (born February 20, 1991) is an American mixed martial artist who competes in the Flyweight division. She has previously competed in the Ultimate Fighting Championship (UFC) and Professional Fighters League (PFL).

== Background ==
Young, following her younger brother, started Shotokan karate at the age of eight and after a few years switched to competitive karate in which she competed until high school. She started wrestling while attending Franklin County High School and after faring well solely against boys she took a wrestling scholarship at King University where she was an All-American in 2010. She later transferred to East Tennessee State University from where she graduated with bachelor's degree in exercise science.

== Mixed martial arts career ==
=== Early career and Invicta FC ===
After three relatively comfortable victories, Young took a hard-fought split decision over Pam Sorenson. After her win over Pam, she received news that she'd suffered a torn labrum in her hip. After recovering from that injury, she tore the same labrum again. She was out for two years due to these injuries before returning to fight for Invicta FC.

Young was supposed to face Raquel Pa'aluhi in her Invicta FC debut, but Raquel pulled out and was replaced by Lisa Verzosa on September 1, 2018, at Invicta FC 31: Jandiroba vs. Morandin. She lost the fight via a split decision.

After losing this fight, she fought twice for Valor Fighting Challenge, winning both fights via stoppage before being invited on Dana White's Contender Series to face Sarah Alpar on August 13, 2019. She lost the fight via 2nd round submission.

Afterwards, she returned to Invicta and fought Maiju Suotama on November 1, 2019, at Invicta FC 38: Murata vs. Ducote. She won the fight via unanimous decision.

After Mariya Agapova was forced to pull out of her fight against Daiana Torquato on February 7, 2020, at Invicta FC 39: Frey vs. Cummins II, Shanna Young replaced Mariya but she was not medically cleared after she fell ill the week of weigh ins.

=== Ultimate Fighting Championship ===
Young made her UFC debut as a replacement for Nicco Montaño against Macy Chiasson on February 15, 2020, at UFC Fight Night 167. She lost the fight by unanimous decision.

Young faced Stephanie Egger on October 2, 2021, at UFC Fight Night: Santos vs. Walker. She lost the fight via technical knockout in round two.

Young faced Gina Mazany on April 30, 2022, at UFC on ESPN 35. She won the fight via TKO in the second round.

Young was scheduled to face Miranda Maverick on August 20, 2022, at UFC 278. However, the bout was cancelled due to Young was hospitalised due to weight cutting issues. The pair was rescheduled at UFC Fight Night 214. She lost the fight via unanimous decision.

On November 16, 2022, it was announced that Young was no longer on the UFC roster.

=== PFL ===
Young faced Sandra Lavado on February 24, 2024, at PFL Challenger Series 13, winning the bout via unanimous decision.

Young faced Kana Watanabe at PFL 1 on April 4, 2024, and lost the bout by unanimous decision. Young missed weight, so she was fined a percentage of her purse and given a point deduction in the standings.

Young faced Ilara Joanne at PFL 4 on June 13, 2024. She lost the bout via unanimous decision.

=== Return to Invicta FC ===
Young made her return to Invicta at Invicta FC 58 against Pamela Boveda on November 6, 2024. She would win the fight via technical knockout just 23 seconds into the first round.

In her next fight, Young would face Katharina Lehner at Invicta FC 60 on February 7, 2025. She would lose the fight via split decision.

Young faced Viviane Araújo on April 11, 2026, at PFL Chicago: Pettis vs. McKee. She lost the bout via unanimous decision.

== Personal life ==
Young has two sons, Chase (born 2010) and Raylon (born 2020).

== Championships and accomplishments ==
=== Mixed martial arts ===
- King of the Cage
  - Women's Bantamweight Championship (one time; former)
    - One successful title defense
- Invicta Fighting Championships
  - Fight of the Night (One time) vs. Lisa Verzosa

== Mixed martial arts record ==
Professional record breakdown
20 matches	11 wins	9 losses
By knockout	3	1
By submission	3	1
By decision	5	7

Res.	Record	Opponent	Method	Event	Date	Round	Time	Location	Notes
Loss	11–9	Viviane Araújo	Decision (unanimous)	PFL Chicago: Pettis vs. McKee	April 11, 2026	3	5:00	Chicago, Illinois, United States	Catchweight (128.2 lb) bout; Young missed weight.
Win	11–8	Amena Hadaya	Decision (unanimous)	UAE Warriors 62	July 24, 2025	3	5:00	Abu Dhabi, United Arab Emirates	Return to Flyweight.
Loss	10–8	Katharina Lehner	Decision (split)	Invicta FC 60	February 7, 2025	3	5:00	Atlanta, Georgia, United States	
Win	10–7	Pámela Bóveda Aguirre	TKO (knees to the body and punches)	Invicta FC 58	November 6, 2024	1	0:23	Kansas City, Kansas, United States	Return to Bantamweight.
Loss	9–7	Ilara Joanne	Decision (unanimous)	PFL 4 (2024)	June 13, 2024	3	5:00	Uncasville, Connecticut, United States	
Loss	9–6	Kana Watanabe	Decision (unanimous)	PFL 1 (2024)	April 4, 2024	3	5:00	San Antonio, Texas, United States	Catchweight (128.6 lb) bout; Young missed weight.
Win	9–5	Sandra Lavado	Decision (unanimous)	PFL Challenger Series 13	February 24, 2023	3	5:00	Orlando, Florida, United States	Catchweight (127.6 lb) bout; Lavado missed weight.
Loss	8–5	Miranda Maverick	Decision (unanimous)	UFC Fight Night: Rodriguez vs. Lemos	November 5, 2022	3	5:00	Las Vegas, Nevada, United States	
Win	8–4	Gina Mazany	TKO (punches)	UFC on ESPN: Font vs. Vera	April 30, 2022	2	3:11	Las Vegas, Nevada, United States	Return to Flyweight.
Loss	7–4	Stephanie Egger	TKO (elbow)	UFC Fight Night: Santos vs. Walker	October 2, 2021	2	2:22	Las Vegas, Nevada, United States	
Loss	7–3	Macy Chiasson	Decision (unanimous)	UFC Fight Night: Anderson vs. Błachowicz 2	February 15, 2020	3	5:00	Rio Rancho, New Mexico, United States	Return to Bantamweight.
Win	7–2	Maiju Suotama	Decision (unanimous)	Invicta FC 38	November 1, 2019	3	5:00	Kansas City, Kansas, United States	
Loss	6–2	Sarah Alpar	Submission (rear-naked choke)	Dana White's Contender Series 24	August 13, 2019	2	2:55	Las Vegas, Nevada, United States	Bantamweight bout.
Win	6–1	Anastasia Bruce	Submission (mounted triangle choke)	Valor Fighting Challenge 56	March 1, 2019	1	2:35	Knoxville, Tennessee, United States	Flyweight debut.
Win	5–1	Jessica Borga	Submission (punches)	Valor Fighting Challenge 54	January 19, 2019	3	3:24	Knoxville, Tennessee, United States	
Loss	4–1	Lisa Verzosa	Decision (split)	Invicta FC 31	September 1, 2018	3	5:00	Kansas City, Missouri, United States	Fight of the Night.
Win	4–0	Pam Sorenson	Decision (split)	KOTC: Generation X	April 8, 2016	5	5:00	Carlton, Minnesota, United States	Defended the KOTC Women's Bantamweight Championship.
Win	3–0	Christina Jobe	TKO (retirement)	KOTC: Bear Brawl	November 21, 2015	3	5:00	Carlton, Minnesota, United States	Won the inaugural KOTC Women's Bantamweight Championship.
Win	2–0	Moriel Charneski	Decision (majority)	KOTC: Attack Mode	July 25, 2015	3	5:00	Lac du Flambeau, Wisconsin, United States	Bantamweight debut.
Win	1–0	Katelyn Dykas	Submission (rear-naked choke)	Valor Fights 22	April 11, 2015	3	1:53	Knoxville, Tennessee, United States	Catchweight (128 lb) bout.

== See also ==
- List of female mixed martial artists
