= Zoila Frausto =

American martial artist

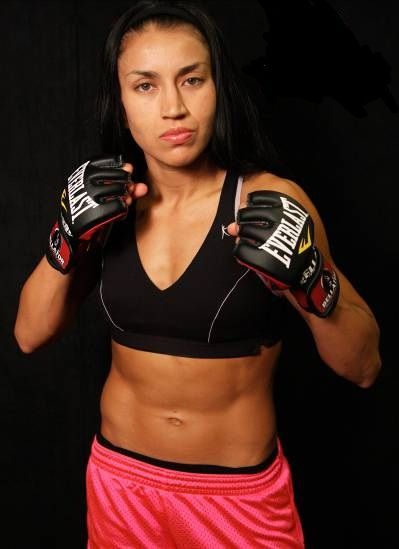
- Born: December 10, 1983 (age 42); Fresno, California, U.S.
- Other names: Warrior Princess
- Height: 5 ft 5 in (165 cm)
- Weight: 115–146 lb (52–66 kg; 8 st 3 lb – 10 st 6 lb)
- Division: Strawweight; Flyweight; Bantamweight
- Reach: 64 in (163 cm)
- Style: Taekwondo, Muay Thai, Brazilian Jiu-Jitsu
- Stance: Orthodox
- Fighting out of: Dublin, California
- Team: Combat Sports Academy
- Rank: Black belt in Taekwondo; Purple belt in Brazilian Jiu-Jitsu
- Years active: 2009–2019

Kickboxing record
- Total: 4
- Wins: 4
- By knockout: 1
- Losses: 0

Mixed martial arts record
- Total: 20
- Wins: 14
- By knockout: 2
- By submission: 2
- By decision: 10
- Losses: 6
- By submission: 3
- By decision: 3

Other information
- Notable relatives: Stephanie Frausto (sister)
- Mixed martial arts record from Sherdog

Zoila Frausto (born December 10, 1983) is an American kickboxer and former professional mixed martial artist. She was the first Bellator Women's Champion.

== Background ==
Zoila is of Mexican descent and heritage. Zoila's father is a third-degree black belt in tae kwon do. Her sister is MMA fighter Stephanie Frausto. She graduated from Madera High School in 2002 and attended Fresno City College.

== Mixed martial arts career ==
Frausto debuted in mixed martial arts on February 13, 2009, and faced Karina Hallinan at WarGods: Valentine's Eve Massacre. She defeated Hallinan by Split Decision.

She next faced Sarah Boyd on June 27, 2009, at Disturbing The Peace in Fresno, California. Frausto won the fight by Unanimous Decision.

On July 25, 2009, Frausto fought a debuting Leeann Jenkins at Pure Combat 9 – Home Turf. She won the fight by Unanimous Decision.

Frausto faced Elisha Helsper, who was coming back from a 3-year layoff, at Strikeforce Challengers: Gurgel vs. Evangelista on November 6, 2009, and won the fight by Unanimous Decision.

She next faced Jessica Rakoczy at Tachi Palace Fights 3 – Champions Collide on February 4, 2010. Frausto won the fight by armbar submission in the first round.

Frausto faced Miesha Tate on March 26, 2010, at Strikeforce Challengers: Johnson vs. Mahe. She lost the fight by armbar submission in the second round.

On May 16, 2010, Frausto dropped down to 125 pounds to face Michelle Ould at TWC 8 – Meltdown in Porterville, California. She was awarded a victory by verbal submission due to an ankle injury Ould sustained while taking Frausto down.

=== Bellator Fighting Championships ===
Frausto faced Rosi Sexton at Bellator 23 on June 24, 2010. She defeated Sexton by knockout due to a knee exactly two minutes into the first round.

She entered the Bellator Season Three 115-pound women's tournament at Bellator 25 and faced Jessica Penne in the opening round. Frausto won the fight via unanimous decision.

Frausto faced Jessica Aguilar in the second round of the Bellator tournament at Bellator 31. She defeated Aguilar via split decision and went on to face Megumi Fujii in the tournament final at Bellator 34 on October 28, 2010. Frausto won a decision, handing Fujii her first professional defeat and becoming the inaugural 115-pound women's champion.

Frausto faced Karina Hallinan at Bellator 35 in a non-title match on March 5, 2011, in Lemoore, California. She won the fight via unanimous decision but suffered a right hand fracture.

Frausto agreed to rematch Jessica Aguilar in a non-title bout at a Bellator event in late October. However, Aguilar withdrew from the planned fight while recovering from foot surgery and Frausto was booked to face Carina Damm at Bellator 57 on November 12, 2011. Frausto withdrew from the bout on October 20 after suffering a torn ACL in training and was sidelined for a year.

Frausto made her return on October 26, 2012, at Bellator 78 in Dayton, Ohio. She defeated Casey Noland by unanimous decision.

Frausto next faced Jessica Eye at Bellator 83 on December 7, 2012. She was defeated when Eye won via standing arm-triangle choke.

=== Invicta Fighting Championships ===
On February 5, 2013, it was announced that Frausto had signed a multi-fight deal with Invicta Fighting Championships. Also in 2013, she vacated her Bellator title. The Bellator women's division was dropped later that year in August.

She faced Jennifer Maia at Invicta FC 5: Penne vs. Waterson on April 5, 2013. Frausto lost the fight via unanimous decision.

On December 7, 2013, Frausto faced Vanessa Porto at Invicta FC 7: Honchak vs. Smith. Frausto lost the fight via unanimous decision.

=== Tachi Palace Fights 26 ===
She defeated short notice replacement Corina Herrera via unanimous decision on February 18, 2016, at “Tachi Palace Fights 26: Brawl in the Hall” in Lemoore, California to end a 4 fight losing skid.

=== Combate Americas ===
After a hiatus that included a divorce and relocating to California, Frausto signed with Combate Americas and made her promotional debut against Jaimelene Nievera at Combate 31 on February 22, 2019. She won the fight via technical knockout in the first round.

As the second fight in the promotion she headlined Combate 41 against Reina Cordoba on August 2, 2019. She lost the bout via submission in the first round.

She is expected to headline Combate Americas' event on December 13, 2019.

=== Muay Thai ===
She defeated Linda Aguilar by second-round TKO in her Muay Thai debut at WCK Muay Thai: Matter of Pride in Temecula, California on February 15, 2014. She took a majority decision win over Jessica Gladstone at WCK Muay Thai: Beauty and the Beast in Lemoore, California on May 1, 2014. Frausto made her third appearance with the promotion against Lindsay Marino at World Championship Kickboxing: Ultimate Conquest on December 4, 2014. She won the fight by unanimous decision.

== Championships and accomplishments ==
- Bellator Fighting Championships
  - Bellator Women's Strawweight Championship (One time; First)
  - Bellator Season 3 Women's Strawweight Tournament Winner
- Women's MMA Awards
  - 2010 Female Flyweight of the Year
  - 2010 Upset of the Year vs. Rosi Sexton on June 24
  - 2010 Headline of the Year defeating Megumi Fujii on October 28
- Grapplers Quest
  - 1st place, 2012 Grapplers Quest World Championships Women's No Gi Intermediate Openweight division

== Kickboxing record ==
Kickboxing record
4 Wins (1 (T)KO, 0 decisions), 0 Losses, 0 Draws
Date	Result	Opponent	Event	Location	Method	Round	Time	Record
2017-01-20	Win	(Germany) Daniela Graf	Glory 37: Los Angeles	Los Angeles, California, US	Decision (unanimous)	3	3:00	4-0
2014-12-04	Win	(United States) Lindsay Marino	World Championship Kickboxing: Ultimate Conquest		Decision (unanimous)	5	3:00	3-0
2014-05-01	Win	(Canada) Jessica Gladstone	World Championship Kickboxing: Beauty and the Beast	Lemoore, California, United States	Decision (majority)	4	3:00	2-0
2014-02-15	Win	(Mexico) Linda Aguilar	World Championship Kickboxing: Matter of Pride	Temecula, California, United States	Retirement	2	3:00	1-0
Legend: Win Loss Draw/No contest Notes

== Mixed martial arts record ==
Professional record breakdown
20 matches	14 wins	6 losses
By knockout	2	0
By submission	2	3
By decision	10	3

Res.	Record	Opponent	Method	Event	Date	Round	Time	Location	Notes
Loss	14–6	Reina Cordoba	Submission (armbar)	Combate 41: Frausto vs. Cordoba	August 2, 2019	1	2:32	Fresno, California, United States	
Win	14–5	Jaimelene Nievera	TKO (punches and knees)	Combate 31: Mexico vs. USA	February 22, 2019	1	1:52	Fresno, California, United States	
Win	13–5	Corina Herrera	Decision (unanimous)	Tachi Palace Fights 26	February 18, 2016	3	5:00	Lemoore, California, United States	
Loss	12–5	Jocelyn Jones-Lybarger	Decision (unanimous)	RFA 31: Smith vs. Marunde	October 9, 2015	5	5:00	Las Vegas, Nevada, United States	For the vacant RFA Women's Strawweight Championship.
Loss	12–4	Vanessa Porto	Decision (unanimous)	Invicta FC 7: Honchak vs. Smith	December 7, 2013	3	5:00	Kansas City, Missouri, United States	
Loss	12–3	Jennifer Maia	Decision (unanimous)	Invicta FC 5: Penne vs. Waterson	April 5, 2013	3	5:00	Kansas City, Missouri, United States	
Loss	12–2	Jessica Eye	Technical Submission (standing arm-triangle choke)	Bellator 83	December 7, 2012	1	0:58	Atlantic City, New Jersey, United States	
Win	12–1	Casey Noland	Decision (unanimous)	Bellator 78	October 26, 2012	3	5:00	Dayton, Ohio, United States	
Win	11–1	Karina Hallinan	Decision (unanimous)	Bellator 35	March 5, 2011	3	5:00	Lemoore, California, United States	Return to Flyweight.
Win	10–1	Megumi Fujii	Decision (split)	Bellator 34	October 28, 2010	5	5:00	Hollywood, Florida, United States	Bellator Season 3 Women's 115 lb Tournament Final; Won the inaugural Bellator Women's Strawweight World Championship.
Win	9–1	Jessica Aguilar	Decision (split)	Bellator 31	September 30, 2010	3	5:00	Lake Charles, Louisiana, United States	Bellator Season 3 Women's 115 lb Tournament Semifinal
Win	8–1	Jessica Penne	Decision (unanimous)	Bellator 25	August 19, 2010	3	5:00	Chicago, Illinois, United States	Bellator Season 3 Women's 115 lb Tournament Quarterfinal
Win	7–1	Rosi Sexton	KO (knee and punches)	Bellator 23	June 24, 2010	1	2:00	Louisville, Kentucky, United States	121 lb catchweight bout.
Win	6–1	Michelle Ould	Submission (ankle injury)	The Warriors Cage 8: Meltdown	May 16, 2010	2	2:42	Porterville, California, United States	
Loss	5–1	Miesha Tate	Submission (armbar)	Strikeforce Challengers: Johnson vs. Mahe	March 26, 2010	2	4:09	Fresno, California, United States	
Win	5–0	Jessica Rakoczy	Submission (armbar)	TPF 3: Champions Collide	February 4, 2010	2	1:17	Lemoore, California, United States	
Win	4–0	Elisha Helsper	Decision (unanimous)	Strikeforce Challengers: Gurgel vs. Evangelista	November 6, 2009	3	5:00	Fresno, California, United States	
Win	3–0	Leann Jenkins	Decision (unanimous)	PureCombat 9: Home Turf	July 25, 2009	3	5:00	Visalia, California, United States	
Win	2–0	Sarah Boyd	Decision (unanimous)	Disturbing The Peace	June 27, 2009	3	5:00	Fresno, California, United States	
Win	1–0	Karina Hallinan	Decision (split)	Wargods/Ken Shamrock Productions: The Valentine's Eve Massacre	February 13, 2009	3	3:00	Fresno, California, United States	

== See also ==
- List of female mixed martial artists
- List of people from Fresno, California

New championship	1st Bellator 115 lbs Women's Championship; October 28, 2010 – 2013	Succeeded by none
