= Olga Rubin =

Israeli mixed martial arts fighter (born 1989)

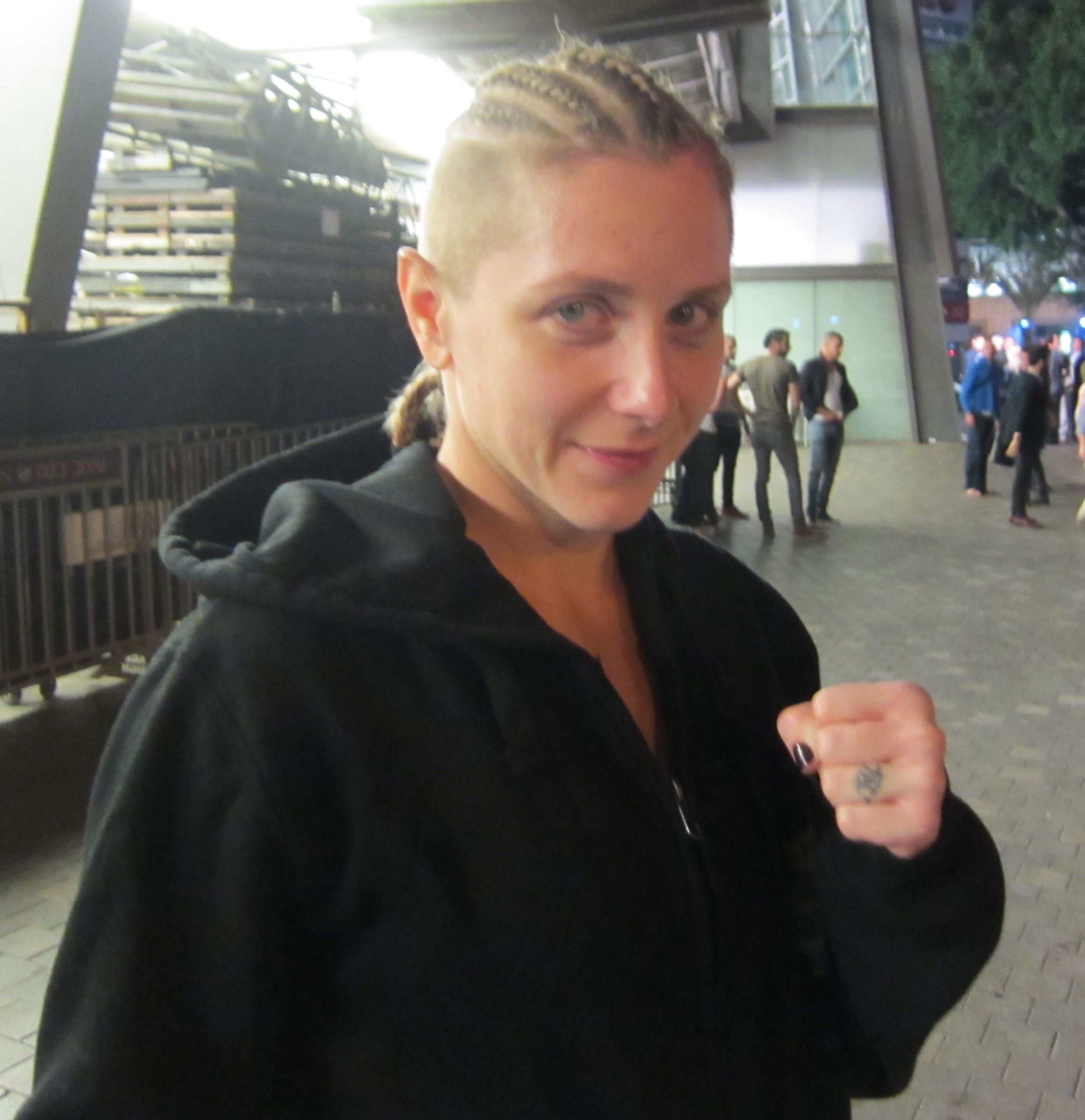
- Born: אולגה רובין; August 18, 1989 (age 37); Moscow, Russian SSR, Soviet Union
- Other names: Big Bad
- Nationality: Israeli
- Height: 5 ft 9 in (1.75 m)
- Weight: 135 lb (61 kg; 9 st 9 lb)
- Division: Bantamweight; Featherweight
- Reach: 69.0 in (175 cm)
- Fighting out of: London, England
- Team: Great Britain Top Team
- Years active: 2016–present

Mixed martial arts record
- Total: 15
- Wins: 10
- By knockout: 3
- By submission: 2
- By decision: 5
- Losses: 5
- By knockout: 2
- By submission: 1
- By decision: 2

Other information
- Mixed martial arts record from Sherdog

Olga Rubin (Hebrew: אולגה רובין, Russian: Ольга Рубин; born August 18, 1989) is a Russian-born Israeli female mixed martial artist who competes in the Bantamweight and Featherweight divisions. A professional since 2016, she fought in Bellator MMA, most notably fighting for the Bellator Women's Featherweight World Championship.

== Background ==
Being born in Moscow, she immigrated to Israel at the age of a year and a half. From the age of three she danced ballet and trained in floor gymnastics and artistic gymnastics. At the age of 15, she stopped and tried her luck at modeling, due to her height of 1.74 m (5 ft 9 in). Being asked to lose some weight, she signed up for a gym and trained in kickboxing, weights and aerobics. However, instead of losing weight, she gained weight and muscle mass, and after seeing a video of Ronda Rousey, realized that this was her vocation.

She married at the age of 20, and had her child before the start of her professional MMA career. She also has a degree in interior design.

Rubin participated heavily in Brazilian jiu-jitsu competitions before her MMA career, winning gold medals at the BJJ North Open Championship in 2014 & 2015, Copa de Israel 2015, JJIF Israeli Championship 2015, and Abu Dhabi no-gi 2015.

== Mixed martial arts career ==
=== Bellator MMA ===
Making her professional debut at Bellator 164 on November 10, 2016, she defeated Laurita Cibirite via TKO in the first round. Rubin would win her next two bouts on the regional Israeli scene, by first-round TKO against Carmel Ben Shoshan at Desert Combat Challenge 9 and Tetyana Voznuk via unanimous decision at Knockout MMA World Tour 1.

Returning to Bellator, Rubin defeated Joana Filipa Magalhães at Bellator 188 via TKO in the second round.

Rubin faced Cindy Dandois on November 15, 2018, at Bellator 209 She won the fight via unanimous decision.

Rubin was scheduled to face Sinead Kavanagh at Bellator 217 on February 2, 2019, who however pulled out of the bout due to injury. Kavanagh was replaced by Iony Razafiarison, whom Rubin defeated by unanimous decision.

Rubin challenged for the Bellator Women's Featherweight World Championship against reigning champion Julia Budd on July 12, 2019, at Bellator 224. She lost the bout in the first round, getting dropped with a body kick and the ground and pounded to a TKO loss.

The bout against Sinead Kavanagh was rebooked for Bellator 234 on November 15, 2019. Rubin lost via TKO in the second round.

In July 2021, she was released from Bellator.

=== Invicta FC ===
In her first appearance post release, Rubin moved down to Bantamweight and faced Priscila de Souza on November 6, 2021, at Oktagon Prime 4. She won the bout via split decision.

Olga challenged for the Invicta FC Bantamweight Championship against reigning champion Taneisha Tennant at Invicta FC 48: Tennant vs. Rubin on July 20, 2022. She lost the close bout by split decision, with scores of 47–48, 48–47 and 50–45.

Rubin faced Serena DeJesus on January 18, 2023, at Invicta FC 51. At weigh-ins, DeJesus came in at 137.3 pounds, 1.3 pounds over the limit and was fined 25% of her purse which went to Rubin. Rubin won the bout via unanimous decision.

Rubin faced Claire Guthrie at Invicta FC 53 on May 3, 2023, winning the fight by buggy choke in the second round.

Rubin challenged Talita Bernardo for the Invicta FC Bantamweight Championship at Invicta FC 55 on June 28, 2024. She lost the fight via second round rear-naked submission.

In her next fight, Rubin would face Mayra Cantuária in the main event of Invicta FC 60 on February 7, 2025. She would lose the fight via unanimous decision.

== Championships and accomplishments ==
=== Mixed martial arts ===
- Combat Press
  - 2023 Submission of the Year vs. Claire Guthrie at Invicta FC 53
- MMA Fighting
  - 2023 Third Team MMA All-Star

== Mixed martial arts record ==
Professional record breakdown
15 matches	10 wins	5 losses
By knockout	3	2
By submission	2	1
By decision	5	2

Res.	Record	Opponent	Method	Event	Date	Round	Time	Location	Notes
Win	10–5	Katharina Lehner	Submission (rear-naked choke)	Invicta FC 62	May 16, 2025	2	1:14	Kansas City, Missouri, United States	Catchweight (137 lb) bout; Lehner missed weight.
Loss	9–5	Mayra Cantuária	Decision (unanimous)	Invicta FC 60	February 7, 2025	3	5:00	Atlanta, Georgia, United States	
Loss	9–4	Talita Bernardo	Submission (rear-naked choke)	Invicta FC 55	June 28, 2024	2	2:53	Kansas City, Kansas, United States	For the Invicta FC Bantamweight Championship.
Win	9–3	Claire Guthrie	Submission (buggy choke)	Invicta FC 53	May 3, 2023	2	4:23	Denver, Colorado, United States	
Win	8–3	Serena DeJesus	Decision (unanimous)	Invicta FC 51	January 18, 2023	3	5:00	Denver, Colorado, United States	Catchweight (137.3 lb) bout; DeJesus missed weight.
Loss	7–3	Taneisha Tennant	Decision (split)	Invicta FC 48	July 20, 2022	5	5:00	Denver, Colorado, United States	For the Invicta FC Bantamweight Championship.
Win	7–2	Priscila de Souza	Decision (split)	Oktagon Prime 4	November 6, 2021	3	5:00	Pardubice, Czech Republic	Bantamweight debut.
Loss	6–2	Sinead Kavanagh	TKO (punches)	Bellator 234	November 15, 2019	2	4:37	Tel Aviv, Israel	
Loss	6–1	Julia Budd	TKO (body kick and punches)	Bellator 224	July 12, 2019	1	2:14	Thackerville, Oklahoma, United States	For the Bellator Women's Featherweight World Championship.
Win	6–0	Iony Razafiarison	Decision (unanimous)	Bellator 217	February 23, 2019	3	5:00	Dublin, Ireland	
Win	5–0	Cindy Dandois	Decision (unanimous)	Bellator 209	November 16, 2018	3	5:00	Tel Aviv, Israel	
Win	4–0	Joana Filipa Magalhães	TKO (punches)	Bellator 188	November 16, 2017	2	3:46	Tel Aviv, Israel	
Win	3–0	Tatiana Voznyuk	Decision (unanimous)	KNO World Tour 1	May 18, 2017	3	5:00	Ashdod, Israel	
Win	2–0	Carmel Ben Shoshan	TKO (punches)	Desert Combat Challenge 9	April 22, 2017	1	4:20	Beersheba, Israel	
Win	1–0	Laurita Likker-Cibirite	TKO (punches)	Bellator 164	November 10, 2016	1	3:12	Tel Aviv, Israel	Featherweight debut.

== See also ==
- List of current Invicta FC fighters
- List of male mixed martial artists
