= Taneisha Tennant =

American mixed martial artist (born 1989)

- Born: June 15, 1989 (age 37); New York, New York, United States
- Other names: Triple Threat
- Nationality: American
- Height: 5 ft 7 in (1.70 m)
- Weight: 135 lb (61 kg; 9 st 9 lb)
- Division: Bantamweight
- Reach: 70.0 in (178 cm)
- Fighting out of: New York, New York
- Team: Budokan Martial Arts Academy
- Years active: 2019–present

Mixed martial arts record
- Total: 7
- Wins: 5
- By knockout: 1
- By decision: 4
- Losses: 2
- By decision: 2

Other information
- Mixed martial arts record from Sherdog

Taneisha Tennant (born June 15, 1989) is a female American mixed martial artist, currently competing in the bantamweight division of Invicta FC, where she is the former Invicta FC Bantamweight Champion.

== Background ==
Tennant was in nursing school when she was diagnosed with Hodgkin's Lymphoma, after which she spent the next year having chemotherapy and radiation therapy. Right after that, Hurricane Sandy hit the New York area, and Tennant's house was flooded to the upper level, losing many of her possessions, photos, and videos. Tennant is currently a full-time nurse charged with the health and safety of her local retirement community.

== Mixed martial arts career ==
=== Invicta FC ===
In her MMA debut at Ring Of Combat 68, she faced Despina Karavas and went on to knock her out in the first round. Tennant made her Invicta FC debut against Serena DeJesus at Invicta FC 38: Murata vs. Ducote on November 1, 2019. Murata won the fight by split decision, with two judges scoring the bout 48-47 and 49–46 in her favor. She won the bout via unanimous decision.

Tennant participated in the Invicta Bantamweight Tournament for the next title shot at the Invicta FC Bantamweight Championship at Invicta FC Phoenix Series 3 on March 6, 2020. She defeated Brittney Victoria via unanimous decision in the quarterfinals, followed by Hope Chase via unanimous decision in the semifinals. In the finals, Tennant defeated Taylor Guardado via unanimous decision.

Tennant moved up to Featherweight and faced Danyelle Wolf at Dana White's Contender Series 33 on September 15. She lost the fight via unanimous decision.

==== Invicta FC Bantamweight champion ====
Tennant faced Lisa Verzosa for the vacant Invicta FC Bantamweight Championship at Invicta FC 44: A New Era on August 27, 2021. Tennant won the one sided bout via unanimous decision, becoming the new Invicta Bantamweight Champion

Tennant made her first Invicta FC Bantamweight title defense against the one-time Bellator MMA featherweight title challenger Olga Rubin at Invicta FC 48: Tennant vs. Rubin on July 20, 2022. She retained her title by split decision, with scores of 47–48, 48–47 and 50–45.

Tennant made her second Invicta FC Bantamweight title defense against the four-fight UFC veteran Talita Bernardo at Invicta FC 51 on January 18, 2023. She lost the fight by unanimous decision, with all three judges scoring the bout 48–46 for Bernardo.

== Professional grappling career ==
Tennant was invited to compete a 135lbs grappling tournament at Rise Invitational 11 on April 1, 2023.

== Championships and accomplishments ==
- Invicta Fighting Championships
  - Invicta FC Bantamweight Championship (One time, former)
    - One successful title defense

== Mixed martial arts record ==
Professional record breakdown
7 matches	5 wins	2 losses
By knockout	1	0
By decision	4	2

Res.	Record	Opponent	Method	Event	Date	Round	Time	Location	Notes
Loss	5–2	Talita Bernardo	Decision (unanimous)	Invicta FC 51	January 18, 2023	5	5:00	Denver, Colorado, United States	Lost the Invicta FC Bantamweight Championship.
Win	5–1	Olga Rubin	Decision (split)	Invicta FC 48	July 20, 2022	5	5:00	Denver, Colorado, United States	Defended the Invicta FC Bantamweight Championship.
Win	4–1	Lisa Verzosa	Decision (unanimous)	Invicta FC 44: A New Era	August 27, 2021	5	5:00	Kansas City, Kansas, United States	Won the vacant Invicta FC Bantamweight Championship.
Loss	3–1	Danyelle Wolf	Decision (unanimous)	Dana White's Contender Series 33	September 15, 2020	3	5:00	Las Vegas, Nevada, United States	Featherweight bout.
Win	3–0	Taylor Guardado	Decision (unanimous)	Invicta FC Phoenix Series 3	March 6, 2020	3	5:00	Kansas City, Kansas, United States	Invicta FC Bantamweight Tournament Final.
Win	2–0	Serena DeJesus	Decision (unanimous)	Invicta FC 38: Murata vs. Ducote	November 1, 2019	3	5:00	Kansas City, Kansas, United States	Bantamweight debut.
Win	1–0	Despina Karavas	KO (body kick)	Ring of Combat 68	May 31, 2019	1	2:02	Atlantic City, New Jersey, United States	Catchweight (140 lb) bout.

== Mixed martial arts exhibition record ==
Res.	Record	Opponent	Method	Event	Date	Round	Time	Location	Notes
Win	2–0	Hope Chase	Decision (unanimous)	Invicta FC Phoenix Series 3	March 6, 2020	1	5:00	Kansas City, Kansas, United States	Invicta FC Bantamweight Tournament Semifinal.
Win	1–0	Brittney Victoria	Decision (unanimous)	Invicta FC Phoenix Series 3	March 6, 2020	1	5:00	Kansas City, Kansas, United States	Invicta FC Bantamweight Tournament Quarterfinal.

== See also ==
- List of female mixed martial artists
- List of current mixed martial arts champions
- List of current Invicta FC fighters

Awards and achievements
Preceded by Julija Stoliarenko	6th Invicta FC Bantamweight Champion; August 27, 2021 – January 18, 2023	Succeeded by Talita Bernardo
