= Jennifer Maia =

Brazilian mixed martial arts fighter

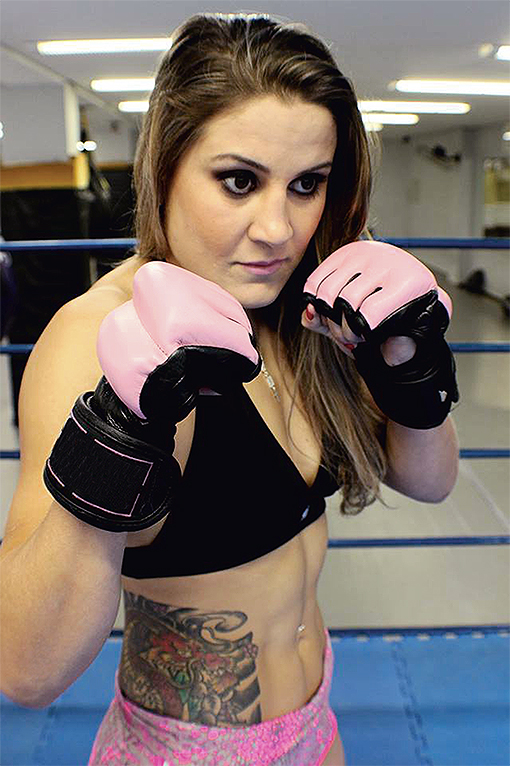
- Jennifer Maia in 2019
- Born: Jennifer Apreciada Gonçalves de Maia; October 6, 1988 (age 38); Curitiba, Paraná, Brazil
- Height: 5 ft 4 in (1.63 m)
- Weight: 125 lb (57 kg; 8 st 13 lb)
- Division: Flyweight
- Reach: 64 in (163 cm)
- Style: Brazilian Jiu-Jitsu, Muay Thai, Boxing
- Team: Chute Boxe Academy (2003–present)
- Rank: Black belt in Brazilian Jiu-Jitsu; Black belt in Muay Thai
- Years active: 2009–present

Professional boxing record
- Total: 3
- Wins: 3
- By knockout: 1
- Losses: 0

Mixed martial arts record
- Total: 34
- Wins: 23
- By knockout: 4
- By submission: 5
- By decision: 14
- Losses: 10
- By knockout: 1
- By submission: 1
- By decision: 8
- Draws: 1

Other information
- Website: jennifermaia.com
- Boxing record from BoxRec
- Mixed martial arts record from Sherdog

Jennifer Apreciada Gonçalves de Maia (born October 6, 1988) is a Brazilian professional mixed martial artist who competes in the bantamweight division of Invicta FC, where she is the current Invicta FC Bantamweight Champion. She has also competed in the Women's Flyweight division. Maia trains at Chute Boxe Academy in Brazil. A professional since 2009, Maia is most notable for her 12 bout stint in the Ultimate Fighting Championship (UFC) and for being the former Invicta FC Flyweight World Champion.

== Background ==
Maia was born in Curitiba, Paraná, Brazil, on October 6, 1988. Playing soccer since childhood, Maia transitioned to Muay Thai, at the age of 15. She won several national titles in the discipline before turning to boxing and then mixed martial arts.

== Boxing career ==
On March 29, 2008, Maia made her professional Boxing debut at Centri de Boxe in Curitiba, Brazil. She faced Michelle Bonassoli in an eight-round bout that went the distance and saw her victorious via unanimous decision.

Her second bout was against Juliana de Aguiar, another eight-round bout in which she won via points.

The last boxing match Maia competed in before transitioning into MMA was on August 5, 2009. She defeated Lorena Nancy Lopez via TKO in the fourth round.

== Mixed martial arts career ==
=== Early career ===
Maia made her professional MMA debut on December 5, 2009. She won her first four fights, finishing each of them in the first round with three submissions and one TKO.

On October 28, 2011, Maia suffered her first loss to fellow Brazilian Vanessa Porto at Kumite MMA Combate. She was defeated by a second-round armbar.

Maia rebounded with a second-round submission victory over Tatiane Porfirio Aguiar at Pink Fight 1 on January 29, 2012.

Maia was scheduled to face Vanessa Porto in a rematch at Pink Fight 2, but she withdrew from the fight in order to compete in the Cage Warriors women's flyweight title tournament.

At Cage Warriors Fight Night 4 on March 16, 2012, Maia suffered a somewhat controversial knockout loss to future UFC fighter Sheila Gaff. At the start of the fight, when both fighters met in the center of the cage to touch gloves, Gaff unloaded a flurry of punches that knocked Maia out in just 10 seconds.

Maia next faced future UFC Women's Strawweight Championship Jéssica Andrade on December 15, 2012, at Samurai FC 9: Water vs. Fire. She won the fight via unanimous decision.

=== Invicta Fighting Championships ===
Maia made her Invicta Fighting Championships debut at Invicta FC 5: Penne vs. Waterson on April 5, 2013, against former Bellator Women's Strawweight Champion Zoila Frausto Gurgel. She won the fight via unanimous decision.

Maia then faced off against Leslie Smith in a #1 contender's fight for a shot at the Flyweight Championship held by Barb Honchak at Invicta FC 6: Coenen vs. Cyborg on July 13, 2013. She lost the fight via unanimous decision.

After returning from the regional scene in Brazil, in which she went 2–0, Maia next faced DeAnna Bennett on December 5, 2014, at Invicta FC 10: Waterson vs. Tiburcio. She lost the fight via unanimous decision.

==== Invicta FC Flyweight Champion ====
Following the loss, Maia once again returned to the regional scene in Brazil, going 3–0 before returning to Invicta. She next faced Vanessa Porto on March 11, 2016, at Invicta FC 16: Hamasaki vs. Brown for the interim Invicta FC Flyweight Championship in a rematch of their 2011 bout. She won the fight via unanimous decision to capture the title.

Due to long-time Invicta FC Flyweight Champion Barb Honchak still unable to compete in a title unification bout, Maia was scheduled to face Roxanne Modafferi in a defense of her interim title on September 23, 2016, at Invicta FC 19: Maia vs. Modafferi. However, during the official weigh-in, it was announced that Barb Honchak was stripped of her title and that Maia would now be defending her undisputed championship at the event. Maia successfully defended her title, winning the fight via split decision.

Maia's next title defense came against undefeated Agnieszka Niedźwiedź on December 8, 2017, at Invicta FC 26: Maia vs. Niedzwiedz. She won the fight via unanimous decision, successfully defending her title for the second time.

On July 7, 2018, Maia vacated her Invicta FC Flyweight Championship.

=== Ultimate Fighting Championship ===
Maia was signed with the Ultimate Fighting Championship in 2018.

Maia made her UFC debut against Liz Carmouche at UFC Fight Night 133 on July 14, 2018. Maia lost the fight by unanimous decision.

It was announced by USADA on January 15, 2019, that Maia had tested positive during an out-of-competition drug test for multiple banned substances, which they determined were ingested through tainted supplements. As a result, she was suspended six months retroactive to August 16, 2018.

Maia faced Alexis Davis on March 23, 2019, at UFC Fight Night 148. She won the fight via unanimous decision.

Maia faced Roxanne Modafferi on July 20, 2019, at UFC on ESPN 4 in a rematch of their 2016 Invicta FC Flyweight Championship bout, which Maia won via split decision. At the weigh-ins, Maia weighed in at 129 pounds, 3 pounds over the women's flyweight non-title fight limit of 126. As a result, she was fined 30 percent of her purse, and the bout proceeded a catchweight fight. Maia won the fight via unanimous decision.

As the first fight of her new six-fight contract with the UFC, Maia faced Katlyn Chookagian on November 2, 2019, at UFC 244. At the weigh-ins, Maia weighed in at 127.2 pounds, 1.2 pounds over the flyweight non-title fight limit of 126. The bout went ahead at catchweight and Maia was fined 25% of her purse and went to her opponent. Maia lost the fight via unanimous decision.

Maia was scheduled to meet Viviane Araújo on June 27, 2020, at UFC on ESPN: Poirier vs. Hooker. However, the bout was rescheduled in mid-June to take place on August 1, 2020, at UFC Fight Night: Brunson vs. Shahbazyan, after both participants faced travel restrictions related to the COVID-19 pandemic. Subsequently, Araújo was removed from the card in mid-July, after testing positive for COVID-19, and she was replaced by Joanne Calderwood. Maia won the fight via armbar submission in round one. This win earned her the Performance of the Night award.

==== UFC Flyweight title shot ====
Maia faced Valentina Shevchenko for the UFC Women's Flyweight Championship on November 21, 2020, at UFC 255. She lost the fight via unanimous decision.

Maia faced Jessica Eye on July 10, 2021, at UFC 264. She won the fight via unanimous decision.

Maia faced Katlyn Chookagian in a rematch on January 15, 2022, at UFC on ESPN 32. She lost the fight via unanimous decision.

As the first bout of her new four-fight contract, Maia faced Manon Fiorot on March 26, 2022, at UFC on ESPN 33. She lost the fight by unanimous decision.

Maia faced Maryna Moroz on November 19, 2022, at UFC Fight Night 214. Maia won the fight via unanimous decision.

Maia faced Casey O'Neill on March 18, 2023, at UFC 286. She won the fight via unanimous decision.

Maia faced Viviane Araújo on October 14, 2023, at UFC Fight Night 230. She lost the fight via unanimous decision.

On October 18, 2023, it was announced that the promotion had decided to not resign her at the conclusion of her contract.

=== Return to Invicta FC ===
In her return to Invicta FC, Maia faced Mayra Cantuária on August 9, 2024 in the main event of Invicta FC 56: Maia vs. Cantuária. She won the fight via unanimous decision.

Maia faced Talita Bernardo for the Invicta FC Bantamweight Championship at Invicta FC 59 on December 13, 2024. She won the title by unanimous decision.

== Professional grappling career ==
Maia faced Beatriz Mesquita in the main event of ADXC 3 on March 2, 2024. She lost the match by submission.

== Championships and accomplishments ==
=== Mixed martial arts ===
- Ultimate Fighting Championship
  - Performance of the Night (One times) vs. Joanne Calderwood
  - Tied (Joanne Wood) for fourth most bouts in UFC Women's Flyweight division history (12)
  - Fourth most total fight time in UFC Women's Flyweight division history (2:59:29)
  - Fourth most significant strikes landed in UFC Women's Flyweight division history (781)
    - Sixth most total strikes landed in UFC Women's Flyweight division history (981)
- Invicta Fighting Championships
  - Invicta FC Bantamweight World Championship (One time; current)
  - Invicta FC Flyweight World Championship (One time; former)
    - Two successful title defenses
  - Interim Invicta FC Flyweight World Championship (One time; former)
  - Fight of the Night (Two times) vs. Vanessa Porto and Roxanne Modafferi
  - Performance of the Night (One time) vs. Agnieszka Niedźwiedź

=== Kickboxing ===
- WGP Kickboxing
  - 2024 WGP Kickboxing Lightweight Champion
    - One successful title defense

== Mixed martial arts record ==
Professional record breakdown
34 matches	23 wins	10 losses
By knockout	4	1
By submission	5	1
By decision	14	8
Draws	1	

Res.	Record	Opponent	Method	Event	Date	Round	Time	Location	Notes
Win	23–10–1	Talita Bernardo	Decision (unanimous)	Invicta FC 59	December 13, 2024	5	5:00	Atlanta, Georgia, United States	Won the Invicta FC Bantamweight Championship.
Win	22–10–1	Mayra Cantuária	Decision (unanimous)	Invicta FC 56	August 9, 2024	3	5:00	Denver, Colorado, United States	Return to Bantamweight.
Loss	21–10–1	Viviane Araújo	Decision (unanimous)	UFC Fight Night: Yusuff vs. Barboza	October 14, 2023	3	5:00	Las Vegas, Nevada, United States	
Win	21–9–1	Casey O'Neill	Decision (unanimous)	UFC 286	March 18, 2023	3	5:00	London, England	
Win	20–9–1	Maryna Moroz	Decision (unanimous)	UFC Fight Night: Nzechukwu vs. Cuțelaba	November 19, 2022	3	5:00	Las Vegas, Nevada, United States	
Loss	19–9–1	Manon Fiorot	Decision (unanimous)	UFC on ESPN: Blaydes vs. Daukaus	March 26, 2022	3	5:00	Columbus, Ohio, United States	
Loss	19–8–1	Katlyn Chookagian	Decision (unanimous)	UFC on ESPN: Kattar vs. Chikadze	January 15, 2022	3	5:00	Las Vegas, Nevada, United States	
Win	19–7–1	Jessica Eye	Decision (unanimous)	UFC 264	July 10, 2021	3	5:00	Las Vegas, Nevada, United States	
Loss	18–7–1	Valentina Shevchenko	Decision (unanimous)	UFC 255	November 21, 2020	5	5:00	Las Vegas, Nevada, United States	For the UFC Women's Flyweight Championship.
Win	18–6–1	Joanne Calderwood	Submission (armbar)	UFC Fight Night: Brunson vs. Shahbazyan	August 1, 2020	1	4:29	Las Vegas, Nevada, United States	Performance of the Night.
Loss	17–6–1	Katlyn Chookagian	Decision (unanimous)	UFC 244	November 2, 2019	3	5:00	New York City, New York, United States	Catchweight (127.2 lb) bout; Maia missed weight.
Win	17–5–1	Roxanne Modafferi	Decision (unanimous)	UFC on ESPN: dos Anjos vs. Edwards	July 20, 2019	3	5:00	San Antonio, Texas, United States	Catchweight (129 lb) bout; Maia missed weight.
Win	16–5–1	Alexis Davis	Decision (unanimous)	UFC Fight Night: Thompson vs. Pettis	March 23, 2019	3	5:00	Nashville, Tennessee, United States	
Loss	15–5–1	Liz Carmouche	Decision (unanimous)	UFC Fight Night: dos Santos vs. Ivanov	July 14, 2018	3	5:00	Boise, Idaho, United States	
Win	15–4–1	Agnieszka Niedźwiedź	Decision (unanimous)	Invicta FC 26	December 8, 2017	5	5:00	Kansas City, Missouri, United States	Defended the Invicta FC Flyweight Championship. Performance of the Night.
Win	14–4–1	Roxanne Modafferi	Decision (split)	Invicta FC 19	September 23, 2016	5	5:00	Kansas City, Missouri, United States	Defended the Invicta FC Flyweight Championship. Fight of the Night.
Win	13–4–1	Vanessa Porto	Decision (unanimous)	Invicta FC 16	March 11, 2016	5	5:00	Las Vegas, Nevada, United States	Won the interim Invicta FC Flyweight Championship. Fight of the Night. Later promoted to undisputed champion.
Win	12–4–1	Dayana Silva	Decision (majority)	Imortal FC 2	December 13, 2015	3	5:00	São José dos Pinhais, Brazil	Bantamweight bout.
Win	11–4–1	Marta Souza	TKO (punches)	Samurai FC 12	October 10, 2015	1	2:51	Curitiba, Brazil	Catchweight (132 lb) bout.
Win	10–4–1	Stephanie Bragayrac	KO (knee)	Imortal FC 1	June 13, 2015	2	2:07	São José dos Pinhais, Brazil	
Loss	9–4–1	DeAnna Bennett	Decision (unanimous)	Invicta FC 10	December 5, 2014	3	5:00	Houston, Texas, United States	
Win	9–3–1	Elaine Albuquerque	Decision (unanimous)	Circuito Talent de MMA 11	August 23, 2014	3	5:00	São José dos Pinhais, Brazil	Won the vacant CT Flyweight Championship.
Win	8–3–1	Mariana Morais	Submission (rear-naked choke)	Talent MMA Circuit 9	May 10, 2014	2	2:18	São José dos Pinhais, Brazil	
Loss	7–3–1	Leslie Smith	Decision (unanimous)	Invicta FC 6	July 13, 2013	3	5:00	Kansas City, Missouri, United States	Invicta FC Flyweight title eliminator.
Win	7–2–1	Zoila Frausto	Decision (unanimous)	Invicta FC 5	April 5, 2013	3	5:00	Kansas City, Missouri, United States	Return to Flyweight.
Win	6–2–1	Jéssica Andrade	Decision (unanimous)	Samurai FC 9	December 15, 2012	3	5:00	Curitiba, Brazil	Bantamweight debut.
Loss	5–2–1	Sheila Gaff	KO (punches)	Cage Warriors Fight Night 4	March 16, 2012	1	0:10	Dubai, United Arab Emirates	Cage Warriors Women's Flyweight Tournament Semifinal.
Win	5–1–1	Tatiane Porfirio Aguiar	Submission (armbar)	Pink Fight 1	January 29, 2012	2	1:17	Porto Seguro, Brazil	
Loss	4–1–1	Vanessa Porto	Technical Submission (armbar)	Kumite MMA Combate	October 28, 2011	2	3:55	Porto Alegre, Brazil	
Draw	4–0–1	Kalindra Faria	Draw	Power Fight Extreme 4	November 20, 2010	3	5:00	Curitiba, Brazil	
Win	4–0	Alessandra Silva	Submission (armbar)	Gladiators FC 2	October 16, 2010	1	1:50	Curitiba, Brazil	
Win	3–0	Jenifer Haas	Submission (punches)	Challenge Mixed Martial Arts	August 7, 2010	1	1:18	Curitiba, Brazil	
Win	2–0	Alessandra Silva	Submission (rear-naked choke)	Power Fight Extreme 2	March 13, 2010	1	4:03	Curitiba, Brazil	
Win	1–0	Suelen Pinheiro Ribeiro	TKO (punches)	Brave FC 4: Explosion	December 5, 2009	1	2:01	Curitiba, Brazil	Flyweight debut.

== Muay Thai and kickboxing record ==
Professional Muay Thai and Kickboxing Record
10 Wins (2 (T)KOs), 0 Loss, 0 Draw
Date	Result	Opponent	Event	Location	Method	Round	Time
2025-06-28	Win	(Uruguay) Marilyn Contin	K-1 World MAX 2025 - South American Round	São José dos Pinhais, Brazil	Decision (Split)	5	3:00
Defends the WGP Kickboxing Women's Lightweight (-60kg) title.
2024-03-24	Win	(Argentina) Yanet Maestrojuan	WGP Kickboxing 73	Sao Jose dos Pinhais, Brazil	TKO (injury)	4	
Wins the interim WGP Kickboxing Women's Lightweight (-60kg) title.
2010-08-21	Win	(Brazil) Fabiana Machado	Torneio Estímulo Muay Thai	Curitiba, Brazil	Decision (Unanimous)	5	3:00
Wins the Parana FPBT Muay Thai -60kg title.
2009-06-07	Win	(Brazil) Gleicy Kelly	Estímulo Muay Thai	Curitiba, Brazil	TKO (Knees)	2	
2008-06-27	Win	(Brazil) Juliana Aguiar	Estímulo Muay Thai	Curitiba, Brazil	Decision	3	3:00
Legend: Win Loss Draw/No contest Notes

== Professional boxing record ==
3 fights	3 wins	0 losses
By knockout	1	0
By decision	2	0

No.	Result	Record	Opponent	Type	Round, time	Date	Location	Notes
3	Win	3–0	(Paraguay) Lorena Nancy Lopez	TKO	4 (6)	5 July 2009	Curitiba Master Hall, Curitiba, Paraná, Brazil	
2	Win	2–0	(Brazil) Juliana De Aguiar	PTS	8	25 July 2008	Centro de Boxe, Curitiba, Paraná, Brazil	
1	Win	1–0	(Brazil) Michelle Larissa Bonassoli	UD	8	29 March 2008	Centro de Boxe, Curitiba, Paraná, Brazil	

== See also ==
- List of female boxers
- List of female kickboxers
- List of female mixed martial artists

Awards and achievements
Preceded by Barb Honchak	2nd Invicta FC Flyweight Champion; September 22, 2016 – July 7, 2018	Succeeded by Vanessa Porto
