= UFC 237 =

UFC mixed martial arts event in 2019

UFC 237: Namajunas vs. Andrade
- The poster for UFC 237: Namajunas vs. Andrade
- Promotion: Ultimate Fighting Championship
- Date: May 11, 2019
- Venue: Jeunesse Arena
- City: Rio de Janeiro, Brazil
- Attendance: 15,193
- Buyrate: 110,000

Event chronology
UFC Fight Night: Iaquinta vs. Cowboy	UFC 237: Namajunas vs. Andrade	UFC Fight Night: dos Anjos vs. Lee

UFC 237: Namajunas vs. Andrade was a mixed martial arts event produced by the Ultimate Fighting Championship that was held on May 11, 2019, at Jeunesse Arena in Rio de Janeiro, Brazil.

== Background ==
The event was originally expected to be held at Arena da Baixada in Curitiba. However, the event was relocated to Jeunesse Arena in Rio de Janeiro, after the UFC failed to come to terms with Athletico Paranaense.

A UFC Women's Strawweight Championship bout between current champion Rose Namajunas and Jéssica Andrade served as the event headliner.

A bout between former bantamweight title challenger Bethe Correia and Irene Aldana took place at the event. The match up was originally scheduled to take place in August 2018 at UFC 227, but Correia pulled out of that event, citing injury. At the weigh-ins, Correia weighed in at 141 pounds, 5 pounds over the women's bantamweight non-title fight limit of 136. As a result, Correia was fined 30 percent of her purse, and the bout proceeded at a catchweight.

A bantamweight bout between Talita Bernardo and Jessica-Rose Clark was scheduled at the event. However, it was reported on April 3, 2019, Clark pulled out of the bout citing injury and was replaced by promotional newcomer Melissa Gatto. In turn, Gatto was pulled from the fight in the days leading up to the event and replaced by Viviane Araújo.

A flyweight bout between Luana Carolina and Wu Yanan was scheduled at the event. However it was reported on April 22, 2019, that Wu pulled out of the bout due to injury and she was replaced by Priscila Cachoeira.

A bantamweight bout between Said Nurmagomedov and Raoni Barcelos at the event. However, it was reported on May 1, 2019, that Nurmagomedov pulled out of the bout for undisclosed reason and he was replaced by newcomer Carlos Huachin.

A lightweight bout between Carlos Diego Ferreira and Francisco Trinaldo was scheduled to take place as part of the main card. However, Ferreira was forced out of the bout on weigh-in day as he was deemed medically unfit due to a weight cutting issue. As a result, the bout was cancelled.

== Results ==
Main card
Weight class				Method	Round	Time	Notes
Women's Strawweight	Jéssica Andrade	def.	Rose Namajunas (c)	KO (slam)	2	2:58	(Note: For the UFC Women's Strawweight Championship.)
Middleweight	Jared Cannonier	def.	Anderson Silva	TKO (leg kicks)	1	4:47
Featherweight	Alexander Volkanovski	def.	José Aldo	Decision (unanimous) (30–27, 30–27, 30–27)	3	5:00
Welterweight	Laureano Staropoli	def.	Thiago Alves	Decision (unanimous) (30–27, 30–27, 29–28)	3	5:00
Catchweight (141 lb)	Irene Aldana	def.	Bethe Correia	Submission (armbar)	3	3:24
Preliminary card (ESPN)
Light Heavyweight	Ryan Spann	def.	Antônio Rogério Nogueira	KO (punches)	1	2:07
Lightweight	Thiago Moisés	def.	Kurt Holobaugh	Decision (unanimous) (30–26, 30–26, 30–27)	3	5:00
Welterweight	Warlley Alves	def.	Sérgio Moraes	KO (punch)	3	4:13
Lightweight	Clay Guida	def.	B.J. Penn	Decision (unanimous) (29–28, 29–28, 29–27)	3	5:00
Early Preliminary card (UFC Fight Pass)
Women's Flyweight	Luana Carolina	def.	Priscila Cachoeira	Decision (unanimous) (30–26, 30–26, 29–27)	3	5:00
Bantamweight	Raoni Barcelos	def.	Carlos Huachin	TKO (punches and elbows)	2	4:49
Women's Bantamweight	Viviane Araújo	def.	Talita Bernardo	KO (punch)	3	0:48

== Bonus awards ==
The following fighters received $50,000 bonuses:

- Fight of the Night: Jéssica Andrade vs. Rose Namajunas
- Performance of the Night: Jéssica Andrade and Warlley Alves

== See also ==
- List of UFC events
- 2019 in UFC
- List of current UFC fighters
