= Jessica Eye =

American mixed martial artist

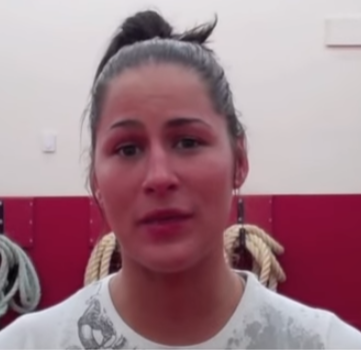
- Eye in 2016
- Born: Jessica Jo-Anne Eye; July 27, 1986 (age 40); Rootstown, Ohio, United States
- Other names: Evil
- Height: 5 ft 6 in (1.68 m)
- Weight: 126 lb (57 kg; 9 st 0 lb)
- Division: Flyweight (2010–2013, 2017–2022); Bantamweight (2013–2016)
- Reach: 66 in (168 cm)
- Fighting out of: Las Vegas, Nevada
- Team: Strong Style Fight Team (2006–2019, 2021–2022); Xtreme Couture Mixed Martial Arts (2019–2021)
- Years active: 2008–2022

Mixed martial arts record
- Total: 27
- Wins: 15
- By knockout: 3
- By submission: 1
- By decision: 11
- Losses: 11
- By knockout: 1
- By submission: 1
- By decision: 9
- No contests: 1

Other information
- Website: http://www.jessicaevileye.com/
- Mixed martial arts record from Sherdog

Jessica Jo-Anne Eye (born July 27, 1986) is a former American professional mixed martial artist currently signed with the Bare Knuckle Fighting Championship (BKFC). She formerly competed as a flyweight in the Ultimate Fighting Championship (UFC).

== Early life ==
Jessica Eye was born in Akron, Ohio to Randy Allen and Colleen Joanne Eye. Eye has two half-sisters, Jennifer Carlisle-Brunner and Heather Carlisle-Hunter, and a brother, Randy Miles Eye. When Eye was 6, her parents divorced. Her mother and sisters were forced to move to the Washington D.C. suburbs of Virginia. Eye attended elementary school in Virginia but returned to Ohio, growing up in Cuyahoga Falls and graduated from high school in Rootstown, Ohio. When she was 16 years old, a drunk driver hit Eye and her father. She suffered a broken back, among other injuries, and was bedridden for three months. She credits this incident with creating her drive towards success in mixed martial arts. She graduated in 2005 from Rootstown High School and Maplewood Career Center. She then attended the University of Akron, but never finished her four-year degree.

On June 4, 2019, Eye wrote in an article for The Players' Tribune detailing abuse she suffered as a teenager from her father, including an incident when Eye was 14, that led to her father being arrested and charged with child endangerment and domestic abuse.

== Mixed martial arts career ==
=== NAAFS and ROC ===
Eye made her amateur mixed martial arts debut in June 2008. She was undefeated as an amateur, winning 5 matches and becoming the first North American Allied Fight Series (NAAFS) amateur women's champion on December 5, 2009.

In June 2010, Eye made her professional MMA debut with North American Allied Fight Series in Ohio, defeating Amanda LaVoy by TKO (elbows). She defeated Marissa Caldwell in her second pro bout.

Eye became the Ring of Combat (ROC) 130 lbs women's champion on February 4, 2011, defeating Ashley Nee by TKO (punches).

She suffered her first loss on June 4, 2011, in an NAAFS professional women's flyweight championship bout against Aisling Daly.

Eye returned to NAAFS to face Angela Magaña in the main event at NAAFS: Rock N Rumble 6 on August 17, 2012. She defeated Magaña by unanimous decision.

=== Bellator Fighting Championships ===
Following her first professional loss, Eye signed with Bellator Fighting Championships. She made her debut in September 2011, defeating Casey Noland by split decision at Bellator 51.

After winning two fights for NAAFS, Eye next competed at Bellator 66 on April 20, 2012. She was originally scheduled to face Aisling Daly in a rematch, but Daly withdrew from the fight due to an ear infection. Eye faced Anita Rodriguez instead and defeated Rodriguez by unanimous decision.

In her third fight with Bellator, Eye defeated then-champion Zoila Frausto Gurgel at Bellator 83 on December 7, 2012, winning with a standing arm-triangle choke in less than one minute. The bout was a non-title bout.

Eye was set to face Munah Holland at Bellator 95 on April 4, 2013. However, Eye suffered a back injury during practice that left her temporarily unable to walk and she was forced to withdraw from a fight for the first time in her career.

On June 1, 2013, Eye defeated Carina Damm by unanimous decision at NAAFS: Fight Night in the Flats 9.

Along with Jessica Aguilar, Eye was released by Bellator on August 13, 2013, following the dissolution of its Women's division. Aguilar and Eye were the last remaining female fighters on the Bellator roster.

=== Ultimate Fighting Championship ===
==== Bantamweight division ====
In August 2013, Eye signed with the Ultimate Fighting Championship (UFC), moving up to the bantamweight division since, at the time, the UFC did not have a women's flyweight division. The anticipation surrounding her debut was covered by USA Today and FoxSports.com.

In her first fight with the promotion, Eye faced Sarah Kaufman at UFC 166 on October 19, 2013. She won the fight via split decision. However, in February 2014, the Texas Department of Licensing and Regulation changed the result to "no decision" with no reason initially given for the change. It was later revealed that Eye had failed her post-fight drug test after testing positive for marijuana and was subsequently fined $1,875 and put on probationary suspension for a year.

Eye faced Alexis Davis on February 22, 2014, at UFC 170. Eye lost the fight via split decision.

She then fought Leslie Smith at UFC 180 on November 15, 2014. She won the fight due to doctor stoppage after Smith's cauliflower ear ruptured mid-fight.

In March 2015, it was announced that Eye would face Miesha Tate on July 25, 2015, at UFC on Fox: Dillashaw vs. Barão 2, with the victor expected to receive a shot at the UFC Women's Bantamweight Championship. Eye expressed confidence heading into the bout, stating, "I know I'm better everywhere it goes. The striking, cage work, ground, everything." Tate remarked that she expected "the best Jessica Eye that anyone has ever seen," and called Eye a tough opponent. Eye lost the fight via unanimous decision.

Eye returned to face Julianna Peña at UFC 192 on October 3, 2015. She lost the fight by unanimous decision.

Eye next faced Sara McMann at UFC Fight Night 88 on May 29, 2016. She lost the fight via unanimous decision.

She fought Bethe Correia at UFC 203 on September 10, 2016, losing by split decision. Afterward, Eye announced that she planned to take a year-long hiatus from MMA competition.

She agreed to a grappling-only rematch with Miesha Tate at a Submission Underground show on December 11, 2016, which was won by Tate in overtime. In May 2017, she announced plans to compete in the UFC's newly created 125-pound flyweight division.

Eye was scheduled to face Aspen Ladd on July 7, 2017, at The Ultimate Fighter 25 Finale. However, the day of the event Ladd fell ill and the bout was canceled.

==== Return to flyweight ====
In August 2017, ESPN reported that Eye would make her UFC flyweight debut against Paige VanZant at UFC 216 on October 7. However, VanZant pulled out of the fight on September 25 citing a back injury. Subsequently, Eye was expected to be rescheduled against a separate opponent at another event.

==== Winning streak and title shot ====
Eye faced Kalindra Faria on January 14, 2018, at UFC Fight Night: Stephens vs. Choi in her debut in the UFC's flyweight division. She won the fight via split decision.

Eye faced Jessica-Rose Clark on June 23, 2018, at UFC Fight Night 132. She won the fight via unanimous decision.

Eye was scheduled to face Sijara Eubanks on December 29, 2018, at UFC 232. The fight was cancelled, and Eye was re-booked against Katlyn Chookagian at UFC 231 on December 8, 2018. Eye won the fight by split decision. Following the bout, the editors of MMAJunkie.com named Eye their "Comeback Fighter of the Year" for 2018, noting that she had benefited from the move to her natural weight class. She also rose to #1 in the official UFC flyweight rankings.

After over a decade of training at Strong Style Fight Team, Eye decided to change training camp due to disagreements, and switched to Xtreme Couture Mixed Martial Arts.

Eye faced Valentina Shevchenko for the UFC Women's Flyweight Championship in the co-main event at UFC 238 on June 8, 2019. She lost the fight by knockout in the second round via a head kick.

==== Post title shot and retirement ====
Eye faced Viviane Araújo on December 14, 2019, at UFC 245 At the weigh-ins, Jessica Eye weighted 131 lbs, five pounds over the non-title flyweight limit of 126 lbs. She forfeited 30% of her fight purse to Araújo. Eye won the fight via unanimous decision.

Eye faced Cynthia Calvillo on June 13, 2020, in the main event at UFC on ESPN: Eye vs. Calvillo. At the weigh-ins on June 12, Eye missed weight, weighing in at 126.25 pounds, a quarter pound over the non-title flyweight of 126 pounds. The fight proceeded as a catchweight bout and Eye was fined 25% of her purse. She lost the fight via unanimous decision.

Eye was briefly linked to a fight with Jéssica Andrade on October 17, 2020, at UFC Fight Night 181. However, the pairing never materialized due to lingering injuries for Eye.

Eye faced Joanne Calderwood at UFC 257 on January 24, 2021. She lost the fight via unanimous decision.

Eye faced Jennifer Maia on July 10, 2021, at UFC 264. She lost the fight via unanimous decision.

Eye was scheduled to face Andrea Lee on November 13, 2021, at UFC Fight Night 197. However, Eye pulled out of the bout in mid-October citing illness and was replaced by Cynthia Calvillo.

Eye was scheduled to face Manon Fiorot on March 5, 2022, at UFC 272. However, a week before the event, Eye withdrew due to injury.

Eye was scheduled to face Casey O'Neill on July 2, 2022, at UFC 276. However, O'Neill withdrew in late April due to torn ACL and was replaced by Maycee Barber. After losing to Barber via unanimous decision, Eye announced her retirement from MMA.

== Bare-knuckle boxing ==
On April 1, 2025, it was announced that Eye had signed with Bare Knuckle Fighting Championship.

Eye faced Mariya Agapova on June 21, 2025 at BKFC 76 and won the bout by unanimous decision.

Eye is scheduled to face Desiree Yanez on December 11, 2026 at BKFC 97.

== Fighting style ==
In a 2015 interview, UFC president Dana White said the following about Eye:

She's got great takedown defense, terrific hands and she's got that special something about her. She's a fighter, man. She's one of those fighters like I talk about, who is pure fighter. When it's go time, she's as tough as there is, and she loves it.

Known as an agile striker, Eye was largely recognized for exceptional hand speed and her use of variety. During exchanges, she often utilized quick jabs, looping hooks, combinations, and body shots. Against Leslie Smith at UFC 180, she landed 32 strikes in the first two minutes.

In a 2015 commentary, ESPN's Brett Okamoto noted that Eye "makes a concerted effort to pick opponents apart, dart in and out, move laterally and work behind her jab." However, he also described her as predictable at times due to her extensive focus on boxing. Following Eye's UFC debut, Gregg Doyel of CBSSports.com called her "a skilled striker with fast hands." Damon Martin of FoxSports.com has described Eye as "one of the best strikers" in women's MMA.

In addition to her boxing, she made regular use of body kicks. She was also known for her active striking during a clinch. When pressing an opponent against the cage, she normally attacked with knees, elbows, and uppercuts.

== In popular culture ==
In July 2015, Eye was considered for the cover of Cosmopolitan as part of a feature on female athletes. She modeled for the article and discussed how her upbringing had led her to become a fighter. Elizabeth Narins, the publication's fitness and health editor, called Eye "strong and amazing".

A re-mixed version of the song "Till I Die", by Machine Gun Kelly, references Eye.

In March 2016, Eye was featured in Pressure Life, a Cleveland-based theme magazine.

== Championships and accomplishments ==
- Ultimate Fighting Championship
  - UFC.com Awards
    - 2013: Ranked #10 Newcomer of the Year
- MMAJunkie.com
  - 2018 Comeback Fighter of the Year
- Ring of Combat
  - ROC 130 lb Women's Championship (One Time)

== Mixed martial arts record ==
Professional record breakdown
27 matches	15 wins	11 losses
By knockout	3	1
By submission	1	1
By decision	11	9
No contests	1	

Res.	Record	Opponent	Method	Event	Date	Round	Time	Location	Notes
Loss	15–11 (1)	Maycee Barber	Decision (unanimous)	UFC 276	July 2, 2022	3	5:00	Las Vegas, Nevada, United States	
Loss	15–10 (1)	Jennifer Maia	Decision (unanimous)	UFC 264	July 10, 2021	3	5:00	Las Vegas, Nevada, United States	
Loss	15–9 (1)	Joanne Calderwood	Decision (unanimous)	UFC 257	January 24, 2021	3	5:00	Abu Dhabi, United Arab Emirates	
Loss	15–8 (1)	Cynthia Calvillo	Decision (unanimous)	UFC on ESPN: Eye vs. Calvillo	June 13, 2020	5	5:00	Las Vegas, Nevada, United States	Catchweight (126.25 lb) bout; Eye missed weight.
Win	15–7 (1)	Viviane Araújo	Decision (unanimous)	UFC 245	December 14, 2019	3	5:00	Las Vegas, Nevada, United States	Catchweight (131 lb) bout; Eye missed weight.
Loss	14–7 (1)	Valentina Shevchenko	KO (head kick)	UFC 238	June 8, 2019	2	0:26	Chicago, Illinois, United States	For the UFC Women's Flyweight Championship.
Win	14–6 (1)	Katlyn Chookagian	Decision (split)	UFC 231	December 8, 2018	3	5:00	Toronto, Ontario, Canada	
Win	13–6 (1)	Jessica-Rose Clark	Decision (unanimous)	UFC Fight Night: Cowboy vs. Edwards	June 23, 2018	3	5:00	Kallang, Singapore	
Win	12–6 (1)	Kalindra Faria	Decision (split)	UFC Fight Night: Stephens vs. Choi	January 14, 2018	3	5:00	St. Louis, Missouri, United States	Return to Flyweight.
Loss	11–6 (1)	Bethe Correia	Decision (split)	UFC 203	September 10, 2016	3	5:00	Cleveland, Ohio, United States	
Loss	11–5 (1)	Sara McMann	Decision (unanimous)	UFC Fight Night: Almeida vs. Garbrandt	May 29, 2016	3	5:00	Las Vegas, Nevada, United States	
Loss	11–4 (1)	Julianna Peña	Decision (unanimous)	UFC 192	October 3, 2015	3	5:00	Houston, Texas, United States	Eye was deducted one point in round 2 due to an illegal knee.
Loss	11–3 (1)	Miesha Tate	Decision (unanimous)	UFC on Fox: Dillashaw vs. Barão 2	July 25, 2015	3	5:00	Chicago, Illinois, United States	
Win	11–2 (1)	Leslie Smith	TKO (doctor stoppage)	UFC 180	November 15, 2014	2	1:30	Mexico City, Mexico	
Loss	10–2 (1)	Alexis Davis	Decision (split)	UFC 170	February 22, 2014	3	5:00	Las Vegas, Nevada, United States	
NC	10–1 (1)	Sarah Kaufman	NC (overturned)	UFC 166	October 19, 2013	3	5:00	Houston, Texas, United States	Bantamweight bout. Split decision win for Eye overturned as she tested positive for marijuana.
Win	10–1	Carina Damm	Decision (unanimous)	NAAFS: Fight Night in the Flats 9	June 1, 2013	3	5:00	Cleveland, Ohio, United States	Catchweight (132 lb) bout; Damm missed weight.
Win	9–1	Zoila Frausto Gurgel	Technical Submission (arm-triangle choke)	Bellator 83	December 7, 2012	1	0:58	Atlantic City, New Jersey, United States	
Win	8–1	Angela Magaña	Decision (unanimous)	NAAFS: Rock N Rumble 6	August 17, 2012	3	5:00	Cleveland, Ohio, United States	
Win	7–1	Anita Rodriguez	Decision (unanimous)	Bellator 66	April 20, 2012	3	5:00	Cleveland, Ohio, United States	Catchweight (131 lb) bout.
Win	6–1	Kelly Warren	Decision (unanimous)	NAAFS: Caged Vengeance 10	February 18, 2012	3	5:00	Cleveland, Ohio, United States	
Win	5–1	Jennifer Scott	Decision (unanimous)	NAAFS: Night of Champions 2011	November 23, 2011	3	5:00	Canton, Ohio, United States	
Win	4–1	Casey Noland	Decision (split)	Bellator 51	September 24, 2011	3	5:00	Canton, Ohio, United States	Catchweight (128 lb) bout.
Loss	3–1	Aisling Daly	Submission (rear-naked choke)	NAAFS: Fight Night in the Flats 7	June 4, 2011	2	4:00	Cleveland, Ohio, United States	For the NAAFS Women's Flyweight Championship.
Win	3–0	Ashley Nee	TKO (punches)	Ring of Combat 34	February 4, 2011	1	4:34	Atlantic City, New Jersey, United States	Won the ROC 130 lb Women's Championship.
Win	2–0	Marissa Caldwell	Decision (unanimous)	NAAFS: Eve of Destruction 1	September 18, 2010	3	5:00	Akron, Ohio, United States	
Win	1–0	Amanda LaVoy	TKO (elbows)	NAAFS: Fight Night in the Flats 6	June 5, 2010	2	3:18	Cleveland, Ohio, United States	

== Bare-knuckle boxing record ==
Professional record breakdown
1 match	1 win	0 losses
By decision	1	0

Res.	Record	Opponent	Method	Event	Date	Round	Time	Location	Notes
Win	1–0	Mariya Agapova	Decision (unanimous)	BKFC 76	June 21, 2025	5	2:00	Fort Worth, Texas, United States	

== See also ==
- List of female mixed martial artists
