= Pam Sorenson =

American mixed martial artist

- Born: Pamela Sorenson; March 30, 1986 (age 40); Blaine, Minnesota, United States
- Other names: Bam
- Nationality: American
- Height: 5 ft 7 in (1.70 m)
- Weight: 145 lb (66 kg; 10 st 5 lb)
- Division: Featherweight
- Reach: 65.0 in (165 cm)
- Fighting out of: Minneapolis, Minnesota, United States
- Team: The Cellar Fight & Fitness
- Years active: 2015–2023

Mixed martial arts record
- Total: 15
- Wins: 9
- By knockout: 1
- By submission: 1
- By decision: 7
- Losses: 6
- By submission: 2
- By decision: 4

Other information
- Mixed martial arts record from Sherdog

Pam Sorenson (born March 3, 1986) is a female retired American mixed martial artist who competed in Featherweight division. She has previously competed in Bellator MMA and Invicta Fighting Championships, where she is the former Invicta FC Featherweight Championship.

== Background ==
Sorenson was born in Blaine, Minnesota, United States. She started picked up kickboxing class to lose weight after suffering a period of depression due to a passing of her best friend. Sorenson began competing in kickboxing shortly later.

== Mixed martial arts career ==
=== Early career ===
After a 5-1 amateur record, Sorenson started her professional mixed martial arts career in 2015. She fought all her fights under King of the Cage promotion prior joined Invicta Fighting Championships, amassing a record of 4-1.

=== Invicta Fighting Championships ===
Sorenson made her promotional debut on November 18, 2016, at Invicta FC 20: Evinger vs. Kunitskaya against Jessica-Rose Clark. She won the fight via split decision.

Her next fight was on May 20, 2017, at Invicta FC 23: Porto vs. Niedźwiedź. She faced Ediane Gomes in a featherweight bout and she lost the fight in split decision.

On July 15, 2017, Sorenson faced Helena Kolesnyk at Invicta FC 24: Dudieva vs. Borella. She won the via a submission in round one.

=== Alpha One Sports ===
Sorenson faced Jan Finney on November 22, 2018, at Alpha One Sports: IT Fight Series 77. She won the fight via split decision.

=== The Ultimate Fighter 28 ===
Sorenson participated tryout in the Ultimate Fighting Championships (UFC) TV series The Ultimate Fighter 28 for the females featherweight weight class in 2018. However, she failed to make it as one of the cast in the program.

=== Return to Invicta Fighting Championships ===
After one-year hiatus, Sorenson returned to Invicta and faced Felicia Spencer on November 16, 2018, at Invicta FC 32: Spencer vs. Sorenson for the vacant Invicta FC Featherweight Championship. She lost the fight via a rear-naked choke in round four.

Sorenson faced Kaitlin Young on August 9, 2019, at Invicta FC 36: Sorenson vs. Young for the vacant Invicta FC Featherweight Championship after former champion Felicia Spencer signed with the UFC. Sorenson won the fight and the title in a five round unanimous decision.

=== Bellator MMA ===
On July 13, 2021, Sorenson announced that she was released from Invicta FC, upon her request, and in the process vacated the title. Soon after it was announced that she had signed a multi-fight deal with Bellator MMA.

Sorenson faced Roberta Paim Samad on August 13, 2021, at Bellator 264. She won the bout via split decision.

Sorenson faced Arlene Blencowe on November 12, 2021, at Bellator 271. She lost the bout via unanimous decision.

Sorenson was scheduled to face Cat Zingano on March 11, 2022, at Bellator 276. However, Zingano was forced to pull out due to injury and the bout was cancelled. The bout was rebooked for Bellator 282 on June 24, 2022. She lost the bout via unanimous decision.

Sorenson faced promotional newcomer Sara Collins on March 31, 2023, at Bellator 293. She lost the fight via a scarf hold armlock submission in the first round.

On August 28, 2023, Sorenson announced her retirement on her social media.

== Professional grappling career ==
Sorensen signed up to compete in the women's under 70 kg and absolute division at the ADCC Denver Open on May 13, 2023. She did not reach the podium at the event.

She was then booked to compete in a 145 lbs tournament at Midwest Finishers 14 on May 26, 2023.

== Championships and accomplishments ==
=== Mixed martial arts ===
- Invicta Fighting Championships
  - Invicta FC Featherweight Championship (One time)
- King of the Cage
  - KOTC Women's Bantamweight Championship (One time)

=== Muay Thai ===
- 2015 Muay Thai Classic Women’s A-Class champion

== Mixed martial arts record ==
Professional record breakdown
15 matches	9 wins	6 losses
By knockout	1	0
By submission	1	2
By decision	7	4

Res.	Record	Opponent	Method	Event	Date	Round	Time	Location	Notes
Loss	9–6	Sara Collins	Submission (scarf hold armlock)	Bellator 293	March 31, 2023	1	2:43	Temecula, California, United States	
Loss	9–5	Cat Zingano	Decision (unanimous)	Bellator 282	June 24, 2022	3	5:00	Uncasville, Connecticut, United States	Zingano was deducted one point in round 1 due to an illegal knee.
Loss	9–4	Arlene Blencowe	Decision (unanimous)	Bellator 271	November 12, 2021	3	5:00	Hollywood, Florida, United States	
Win	9–3	Roberta Paim Samad	Decision (split)	Bellator 264	August 13, 2021	3	5:00	Uncasville, Connecticut, United States	
Win	8–3	Kaitlin Young	Decision (unanimous)	Invicta FC 36: Sorenson vs. Young	August 9, 2019	5	5:00	Kansas City, Kansas, United States	Won the vacant Invicta FC Featherweight Championship.
Loss	7–3	Felicia Spencer	Submission (rear-naked choke)	Invicta FC 32: Spencer vs. Sorenson	November 16, 2018	4	4:23	Kansas City, Missouri, United States	For the vacant Invicta FC Featherweight Championship.
Win	7–2	Jan Finney	Decision (split)	Alpha One Sports: IT Fight Series 77	November 22, 2017	3	5:00	Bellefontaine, Ohio, United States	Catchweight (140 lb) bout.
Win	6–2	Helena Kolesnyk	Submission (armbar)	Invicta FC 24: Dudieva vs. Borella	July 15, 2017	1	3:12	Kansas City, Missouri, United States	
Loss	5–2	Ediane Gomes	Decision (split)	Invicta FC 23: Porto vs. Niedźwiedź	May 20, 2017	3	5:00	Kansas City, Missouri, United States	Featherweight debut.
Win	5–1	Jessica-Rose Clark	Decision (split)	Invicta FC 20: Evinger vs. Kunitskaya	November 18, 2016	3	5:00	Kansas City, Missouri, United States	
Win	4–1	Christina Barry	Decision (split)	KOTC: Due Process	September 9, 2016	3	2:45	Carlton, Minnesota, United States	Defended the interim KOTC Women's Bantamweight Championship.
Win	3–1	Brenda Gonzales	Decision (unanimous)	KOTC: Natural Instinct	July 30, 2016	5	5:00	Lac du Flambeau, Wisconsin, United States	Won the interim KOTC Women's Bantamweight Championship.
Loss	2–1	Shanna Young	Decision (split)	KOTC: Generation X	April 8, 2016	5	5:00	Kansas City, Missouri, United States	For the inaugural KOTC Women's Bantamweight Championship.
Win	2–0	Nicco Montaño	Decision (split)	KOTC: Frozen War	February 20, 2016	3	5:00	Walker, Minnesota, United States	
Win	1–0	Moriel Charneski	Decision (split)	KOTC: Bear Brawl	November 21, 2015	3	5:00	Carlton, Minnesota, United States	Bantamweight debut.

== See also ==
- List of female mixed martial artists
