= Katharina Lehner =

German mixed martial arts (MMA) fighter

- Born: April 9, 1990 (age 36); Schwandorf, Germany
- Nationality: German
- Height: 5 ft 6 in (1.68 m)
- Weight: 135 lb (61 kg; 9.6 st)
- Division: Bantamweight (MMA)
- Reach: 67 in (170 cm)
- Fighting out of: Cologne, Germany
- Team: Combat Club Cologne
- Years active: 2014 - present

Mixed martial arts record
- Total: 19
- Wins: 9
- By knockout: 1
- By decision: 8
- Losses: 10
- By knockout: 1
- By submission: 4
- By decision: 5

Other information
- Mixed martial arts record from Sherdog

Katharina Lehner (born April 9, 1990) is a German mixed martial artist who competes in the women's Bantamweight division. She has also previously fought in Bellator MMA and Invicta FC. She fought Sarah Kaufman for the Invicta Bantamweight title in the main event of Invicta FC 29.

== Mixed martial arts career ==
=== Invicta FC ===
Lehner made her professional debut against Anne Merkt at We Love MMA 9 on September 27, 2014. She won the fight by split decision, and amassed a 5–0 record before signing with Invicta FC. Lehner made her debut against Alexa Conners at Invicta FC 25: Kunitskaya vs. Pa'aluhi on August 31, 2017. She won the fight by a first-round technical knockout.

After defeating Gemma Pike by unanimous decision at Hype FC 7 on December 16, 2017, Lehner was booked to face Sarah Kaufman for the vacant Invicta FC Bantamweight Championship at Invicta FC 29: Kaufman vs. Lehner on May 4, 2018. She lost the fight by a third-round submission.

Lehner faced Lisa Spangler at Invicta FC 35: Bennett vs. Rodriguez II on June 7, 2019. She lost the fight by unanimous decision.

Lehner faced Sinead Kavanagh at Bellator Milan 3 on October 3, 2020, following a 16-month absence from the sport. She lost the fight by unanimous decision.

Lehner was expected to face Talita Bernardo at Invicta FC 48 on July 20, 2022. Lehner withdrew for an undisclosed reason and was replaced by Yana Gadelha.

Lehner was rebooked against Talita Bernardo on November 16, 2022, at Invicta FC 50, getting submitted via a kimura in the second round.

== Bare-knuckle boxing ==
=== Bare Knuckle Fighting Championship ===
On December 2, 2023, it was announced that Lehner signed a multi-fight deal with Bare Knuckle Fighting Championship.

Lehner made her BKFC debut against Jessica Borga on April 12, 2024, at BKFC Fight Night 13. She lost the bout by knockout in the first round.

== Power Slap ==
Lehner faced on June 28, 2024, in her first slap-fighting bout at Power Slap 8 and lost as a result of a disqualification due to two clubbing fouls.

== Mixed martial arts record ==
Professional record breakdown
19 matches	9 wins	10 losses
By knockout	1	1
By submission	0	4
By decision	8	5

Res.	Record	Opponent	Method	Event	Date	Round	Time	Location	Notes
Loss	9–10	Brittney Victoria Grizzelle	Decision (unanimous)	Tuff-N-Uff 158	October 24, 2026	3	5:00	Las Vegas, Nevada, United States	
Loss	9–9	Lucie Pudilová	Decision (unanimous)	Oktagon 83	January 31, 2026	3	5:00	Stuttgart, Germany	
Loss	9–8	Alina Dalaslan	Decision (unanimous)	Oktagon 78	October 18, 2025	3	5:00	Cologne, Germany	
Loss	9–7	Maya Stewart	Submission (rear-naked choke)	Fury FC 109	September 7, 2025	3	3:37	Houston, Texas, United States	
Loss	9–6	Olga Rubin	Submission (rear-naked choke)	Invicta FC 62	May 16, 2025	2	1:14	Kansas City, Missouri, United States	Catchweight (137 lb) bout; Lehner missed weight.
Win	9–5	Shanna Young	Decision (split)	Invicta FC 60	February 7, 2025	3	5:00	Atlanta, Georgia, United States	
Loss	8–5	Melissa Croden	TKO (punches)	LFA 169	October 6, 2023	3	3:20	Dallas, Texas, United States	Catchweight (140 lb) bout.
Win	8–4	Abril Anguiano	Decision (unanimous)	Peak Fighting 27	March 11, 2023	3	5:00	Frisco, Texas, United States	Catchweight (140 lb) bout.
Loss	7–4	Talita Bernardo	Submission (kimura)	Invicta FC 50	November 16, 2022	2	4:26	Denver, Colorado, United States	
Loss	7–3	Sinead Kavanagh	Decision (unanimous)	Bellator Milan 3	October 3, 2020	3	5:00	Milan, Italy	Featherweight bout.
Loss	7–2	Lisa Spangler	Decision (unanimous)	Invicta FC 35	June 7, 2019	3	5:00	Kansas City, Kansas, United States	
Loss	7–1	Sarah Kaufman	Submission (rear-naked choke)	Invicta FC 29	May 4, 2018	3	4:30	Kansas City, Missouri, United States	For the vacant Invicta FC Bantamweight Championship.
Win	7–0	Gemma Pike	Decision (unanimous)	Hype FC 7	December 16, 2017	3	5:00	Bremen, Germany	Featherweight bout.
Win	6–0	Alexa Conners	TKO (punches)	Invicta FC 25	August 31, 2017	1	4:21	Lemoore, California, United States	
Win	5–0	Judith Ruis	Decision (unanimous)	Respect FC 18	December 4, 2016	3	5:00	Cologne, Germany	Return to Bantamweight. Won the Respect FC Women's Bantamweight Championship.
Win	4–0	Alexandra Buch	Decision (unanimous)	GMC 7	November 7, 2015	3	5:00	Castrop-Rauxel, Germany	Catchweight (139 lb) bout.
Win	3–0	Camilla Hinze	Decision (unanimous)	We Love MMA 15	July 4, 2015	3	5:00	Berlin, Germany	Featherweight debut.
Win	2–0	Barbora Polakova	Decision (unanimous)	Young Blood Night Vol. 3	February 6, 2015	3	5:00	Fürth, Germany	Bantamweight debut. Won the YBN Bantamweight Championship.
Win	1–0	Anne Merkt	Decision (split)	We Love MMA 9	September 27, 2014	2	5:00	Hamburg, Germany	Catchweight (137 lb) bout.

== Bare-knuckle boxing record ==
Professional record breakdown
1 match	0 wins	1 loss
By knockout	0	1

Res.	Record	Opponent	Method	Event	Date	Round	Time	Location	Notes
Loss	0–1	Jessica Borga	KO (punch)	BKFC Fight Night Clearwater: Richman vs. Lozano	April 12, 2024	1	0:53	Clearwater, Florida, United States	

== Professional boxing record ==
2 fights	1 win	1 loss
By decision	1	1

No.	Result	Record	Opponent	Type	Round, time	Date	Location	Notes
2	Loss	1–1	Elia Carranza	UD	4	Apr 29, 2023	Miccosukee Casino & Resort, Miami, Florida, U.S.	
1	Win	1–0	Mariam Tatunashvili	MD	4	Dec 15, 2018	Sporthalle Hamburg, Hamburg, Germany	
