= Viviane Araújo (fighter) =

Brazilian mixed martial artist (born 1986)

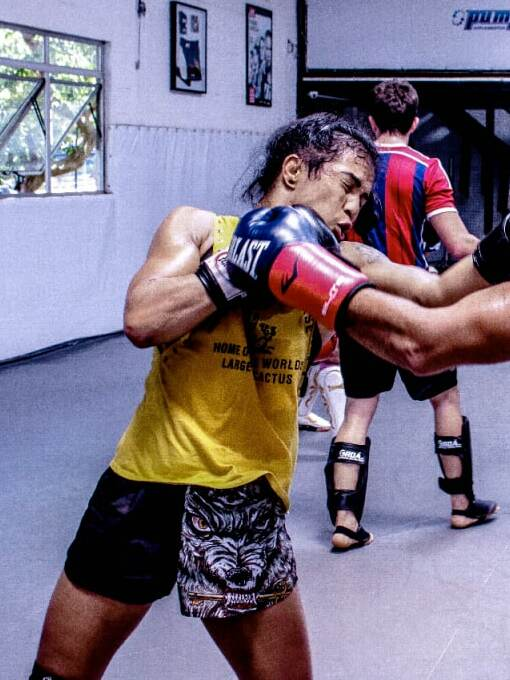
- Born: Viviane Araújo Gomes; November 21, 1986 (age 39); Ceilândia, Federal District, Brazil
- Other names: Vivi
- Height: 5 ft 5 in (1.65 m)
- Weight: 125 lb (57 kg; 8 st 13 lb)
- Division: Flyweight
- Reach: 68 in (173 cm)
- Fighting out of: Brasília, Distrito Federal, Brazil
- Team: Cerrado MMA (2015–present); Companhia Athetica
- Rank: Black belt in Brazilian Jiu-Jitsu under Léo Vieira; Black belt in Luta Livre
- Years active: 2015–present

Mixed martial arts record
- Total: 22
- Wins: 14
- By knockout: 3
- By submission: 4
- By decision: 7
- Losses: 8
- By knockout: 1
- By submission: 1
- By decision: 6

Other information
- Mixed martial arts record from Sherdog

Viviane Araújo Gomes (born November 21, 1986) is a Brazilian professional mixed martial artist who competes in the Women's Flyweight division of the Professional Fighters League (PFL). She is a former Pancrase strawweight champion and competed in the Ultimate Fighting Championship (UFC). As of April 21, 2026, she is #8 in the PFL women's flyweight rankings.

== Background ==
Araújo started playing soccer and spent much of her time away from home to forget about problems at home after witnessing her alcoholic father beating her mother on a daily basis. She later started Brazilian jiu-jitsu and fell in love with the sport after an invitation from her jiu-jitsu coach. She later became a jiu-jitsu teacher and transitioned to mixed martial arts as she was tired of watching her father abuse her mother. Araújo uses the octagon as the platform to voice her support to reach victims of domestic violence.

"The UFC is such a gigantic and powerful platform. A word from a woman can change your life and self-esteem. We have so many people going through things like that that I felt the need to talk about it. We're suffering with domestic violence and violence against women. I lived that reality since I was a kid. I've suffered with that, and I managed to turn the table with sports. My mom is a warrior."

== Mixed martial arts career ==
=== Early career ===
Araújo fought most of her early mixed martial arts career primarily in Brazil and Japan, notably under Jungle Fight and Pancrase where she was the Strawweight Queen of Pancrase prior being signed by the UFC.

=== Ultimate Fighting Championship ===
Araújo made her UFC debut and faced Talita Bernardo, replacing Melissa Gatto, on May 11, 2019 at UFC 237. She won the fight via knockout in the third round.

Her second fight came on July 27, 2019 at UFC 240, against Alexis Davis. She won the fight via unanimous decision.

Araújo faced Jessica Eye on December 14, 2019 at UFC 245 At the weigh-ins, Eye weighed 131 lbs., five lbs. over the Flyweight limit of 126 lbs. She forfeited 30% of her fight purse to Araújo. She lost the fight via unanimous decision.

Araújo was scheduled to meet Jennifer Maia on June 27, 2020 at UFC on ESPN 11. However, the bout was rescheduled in mid-June to take place on August 1, 2020 at UFC Fight Night: Holm vs. Aldana after both participants faced travel restrictions related to the COVID-19 pandemic. Subsequently, Araújo was removed from the card in mid-July after testing positive for COVID-19 and replaced by Joanne Calderwood.

Araújo faced Montana De La Rosa on September 5, 2020 at UFC Fight Night 176. She won the fight via unanimous decision.

Araújo was briefly scheduled to face Roxanne Modafferi on January 30, 2021 at UFC on ESPN 20. However, the fight was rescheduled and took place 10 days earlier at UFC Fight Night 185 instead. She won the fight via unanimous decision.

Araújo faced Katlyn Chookagian on May 15, 2021 at UFC 262. She lost the bout via unanimous decision.

Araújo was expected to face Alexa Grasso on January 22, 2022 at UFC 270. However, Araújo was forced to pull out form the event due to injury, and the bout was cancelled.

Araújo faced Andrea Lee on May 14, 2022 at UFC on ESPN 36. Despite surviving an early knockdown, Araújo won the bout via unanimous decision.

Araújo was rescheduled to face Alexa Grasso on August 13, 2022 at UFC on ESPN 41. However, the bout was cancelled due to Grasso's visa issues. The pair was yet again rescheduled on October 15, 2022 at UFC Fight Night 212. Araújo lost the fight via unanimous decision.

Araújo faced Amanda Ribas on March 4, 2023 at UFC 285. She lost the fight via unanimous decision.

Araújo was scheduled to face Casey O'Neill on September 9, 2023 at UFC 293. However, O'Neill pulled out due to injury, and Araújo was rebooked against Jennifer Maia for October 14, 2023 at UFC Fight Night 230. She won the fight via unanimous decision.

Araújo faced Natália Silva on February 3, 2024, at UFC Fight Night 235 She lost the fight by unanimous decision.

Araújo was scheduled to face Jasmine Jasudavicius on July 13, 2024, at UFC on ESPN 59. However, she withdrew from the bout due to an injury and was replaced by Fatima Kline.

Araújo faced Karine Silva on November 16, 2024 at UFC 309. She won the fight by unanimous decision.

Araújo faced Tracy Cortez on June 28, 2025, at UFC 317. She lost the fight by unanimous decision.

On July 9, 2025, it was reported that Araújo was removed from the UFC roster.

=== Professional Fighters League ===
On September 29, 2025, it was announced that she had signed a contract with the PFL.

Araújo faced Shanna Young on April 11, 2026, at PFL Chicago: Pettis vs. McKee. She won the bout via unanimous decision.

Araújo faced Liz Carmouche on June 27, 2026, at PFL San Diego. She lost the fight via a guillotine choke in round two.

== Championships and accomplishments ==
=== Mixed martial arts ===
- Ultimate Fighting Championship
  - UFC.com Awards
    - 2019: Ranked #10 Newcomer of the Year
- Pancrase
  - Strawweight Queen of Pancrase (One time) vs. Emi Fujino

== Mixed martial arts record ==
Professional record breakdown
22 matches	14 wins	8 losses
By knockout	3	1
By submission	4	1
By decision	7	6

Res.	Record	Opponent	Method	Event	Date	Round	Time	Location	Notes
Loss	14–8	Liz Carmouche	Submission (guillotine choke)	PFL San Diego: McKee vs. Isbulaev	June 27, 2026	2	2:07	San Diego, California, United States	
Win	14–7	Shanna Young	Decision (unanimous)	PFL Chicago: Pettis vs. McKee	April 11, 2026	3	5:00	Chicago, Illinois, United States	Catchweight (128.2 lb) bout; Young missed weight.
Loss	13–7	Tracy Cortez	Decision (unanimous)	UFC 317	June 28, 2025	3	5:00	Las Vegas, Nevada, United States	
Win	13–6	Karine Silva	Decision (unanimous)	UFC 309	November 16, 2024	3	5:00	New York City, New York, United States	
Loss	12–6	Natália Silva	Decision (unanimous)	UFC Fight Night: Dolidze vs. Imavov	February 3, 2024	3	5:00	Las Vegas, Nevada, United States	
Win	12–5	Jennifer Maia	Decision (unanimous)	UFC Fight Night: Yusuff vs. Barboza	October 14, 2023	3	5:00	Las Vegas, Nevada, United States	
Loss	11–5	Amanda Ribas	Decision (unanimous)	UFC 285	March 4, 2023	3	5:00	Las Vegas, Nevada, United States	
Loss	11–4	Alexa Grasso	Decision (unanimous)	UFC Fight Night: Grasso vs. Araújo	October 15, 2022	5	5:00	Las Vegas, Nevada, United States	
Win	11–3	Andrea Lee	Decision (unanimous)	UFC on ESPN: Błachowicz vs. Rakić	May 14, 2022	3	5:00	Las Vegas, Nevada, United States	
Loss	10–3	Katlyn Chookagian	Decision (unanimous)	UFC 262	May 15, 2021	3	5:00	Houston, Texas, United States	
Win	10–2	Roxanne Modafferi	Decision (unanimous)	UFC on ESPN: Chiesa vs. Magny	January 20, 2021	3	5:00	Abu Dhabi, United Arab Emirates	
Win	9–2	Montana De La Rosa	Decision (unanimous)	UFC Fight Night: Overeem vs. Sakai	September 5, 2020	3	5:00	Las Vegas, Nevada, United States	
Loss	8–2	Jessica Eye	Decision (unanimous)	UFC 245	December 14, 2019	3	5:00	Las Vegas, Nevada, United States	Catchweight (131 lb) bout; Eye missed weight.
Win	8–1	Alexis Davis	Decision (unanimous)	UFC 240	July 27, 2019	3	5:00	Edmonton, Alberta, Canada	Flyweight debut.
Win	7–1	Talita Bernardo	KO (punch)	UFC 237	May 11, 2019	3	0:48	Rio de Janeiro, Brazil	Bantamweight debut.
Win	6–1	Emi Fujino	TKO (doctor stoppage)	Pancrase 298	August 5, 2018	3	0:19	Tokyo, Japan	Won the vacant Pancrase Women's Strawweight Championship.
Win	5–1	Ayaka Miura	TKO (eye injury)	Pancrase 290	October 8, 2017	1	5:00	Tokyo, Japan	
Win	4–1	Deize Mayelem de Lima Araújo	Submission (armbar)	Iron Fight Combat 11	July 29, 2017	1	4:27	Feira de Santana, Brazil	
Loss	3–1	Sarah Frota	TKO (punches)	NP Fight Brazil 6	April 15, 2017	1	2:11	Goiânia, Brazil	For the NPF Strawweight Championship.
Win	3–0	Elaine Leal	Submission (armbar)	Jungle Fight 90	September 3, 2016	3	2:38	São Paulo, Brazil	
Win	2–0	Bianca de Araújo Carvalho	Submission (armbar)	Federal Gladiators Combat 1	November 7, 2015	1	3:55	Brasília, Brazil	
Win	1–0	Ana Karla Morais	Submission (heel hook)	Fight K: Águia	October 11, 2015	1	3:35	Gama, Brazil	Strawweight debut.

== See also ==
- List of current PFL fighters
- List of female mixed martial artists
