= Talita Bernardo =

Brazilian mixed martial artist

- Born: Talita de Oliveira Neves Bernardo; March 4, 1987 (age 39); Macaé, Rio de Janeiro, Brazil
- Height: 5 ft 4 in (1.63 m)
- Weight: 135 lb (61 kg; 9 st 9 lb)
- Division: Bantamweight
- Reach: 68 in (173 cm)
- Style: BJJ
- Fighting out of: Barra de São João, Rio de Janeiro, Brazil
- Team: Imperio Fight
- Rank: Black belt in Brazilian Jiu-Jitsu
- Years active: 2015–present

Mixed martial arts record
- Total: 16
- Wins: 11
- By submission: 7
- By decision: 4
- Losses: 5
- By knockout: 2
- By decision: 3

Other information
- University: Degree in physical education
- Children: 1
- Mixed martial arts record from Sherdog

Talita de Oliveira Neves Bernardo (born March 4, 1987) is a Brazilian mixed martial artist (MMA), currently competing in the bantamweight division of Invicta FC, where she is the former Invicta FC Bantamweight Champion. She also had a stint in the UFC.

== Background ==
Talita started training Brazilian jiu-jitsu (BJJ) at the age of 22, after she took up the challenge to fight a friend's BJJ student. She won the fight and transitioned into MMA five years later.

== Mixed martial arts career ==
=== Early career ===
Bernardo started her professional MMA career since 2015 and amassed a record of 5-1 before signed by UFC.

=== Ultimate Fighting Championship ===
Bernardo made her promotional debut on September 2, 2017 against Marion Reneau at UFC Fight Night: Volkov vs. Struve. She lost the fight via technical knockout in round three.

Bernardo next fight came on January 14, 2018 at UFC Fight Night: Stephens vs. Choi against Irene Aldana. She lost the fight via unanimous decision.

On October 27, Bernardo faced Sarah Moras at UFC Fight Night: Volkan vs. Smith. She won the fight via unanimous decision.

Bernardo was scheduled to face Jessica-Rose Clark on May 11, 2019 at UFC 237. However, it was reported on April 3, 2019 Clark pulled out of the bout citing injury and she was replaced by newcomer Melissa Gatto. In turn, Gatto was pulled from the fight in the days leading up to the event and replaced by Viviane Araújo. Bernardo lost the fight via knockout in the third round.

On March 19, 2020, it was reported that Bernardo was no longer part of the UFC's roster.

=== Post UFC ===
Bernardo made her return on July 24, 2021 at OKTAGON 26 against fellow former UFC fighter, Lucie Pudilová. She won the fight via unanimous decision.

=== Invicta FC ===
Bernardo was expected to face Katharina Lehner at Invicta FC 48 on July 20, 2022. Lehner withdrew for an undisclosed reason and was replaced by Yana Gadelha. She won the fight by a second-round submission, forcing Gadelha to tap with a rear-naked choke.

Bernardo was rebooked against Katharina Lehner on November 16, 2022 at Invicta FC 50, submitting Lehner with a kimura in the second round.

==== Bantamweight Champion ====
Bernardo challenged Taneisha Tennant for the Invicta FC Bantamweight Championship at Invicta FC 51 on January 18, 2023. She won the fight by unanimous decision, with all three judges scoring the bout 48–46 in her favor.

Bernardo made her first title defense against Olga Rubin for the Bantamweight Championship at Invicta FC 55 on June 28, 2024. She won the fight via second round rear-naked submission.

In her second title defense, Bernardo faced Jennifer Maia at Invicta FC 59 on December 13, 2024. She lost the title by unanimous decision.

== Personal life ==
Bernardo was a sport teacher prior to fighting MMA professionally. Bernardo has a daughter named Dominique.

== Championships and accomplishments ==
- Invicta Fighting Championships
  - Invicta FC Bantamweight Championship (One time)
    - One successful title defense

== Mixed martial arts record ==
Professional record breakdown
16 matches	11 wins	5 losses
By knockout	0	2
By submission	7	0
By decision	4	3

Res.	Record	Opponent	Method	Event	Date	Round	Time	Location	Notes
Loss	11–5	Jennifer Maia	Decision (unanimous)	Invicta FC 59	December 13, 2024	5	5:00	Atlanta, Georgia, United States	Lost the Invicta FC Bantamweight Championship.
Win	11–4	Olga Rubin	Submission (rear-naked choke)	Invicta FC 55	June 28, 2024	2	2:53	Kansas City, Kansas, United States	Defended the Invicta FC Bantamweight Championship.
Win	10–4	Taneisha Tennant	Decision (unanimous)	Invicta FC 51	January 18, 2023	5	5:00	Denver, Colorado, United States	Won the Invicta FC Bantamweight Championship.
Win	9–4	Katharina Lehner	Submission (kimura)	Invicta FC 50	November 16, 2022	2	4:26	Denver, Colorado, United States	
Win	8–4	Yana Gadelha	Submission (rear-naked choke)	Invicta FC 48	July 20, 2022	2	1:39	Denver, Colorado, United States	
Win	7–4	Lucie Pudilová	Decision (unanimous)	Oktagon 26	July 24, 2021	3	5:00	Prague, Czech Republic	
Loss	6–4	Viviane Araújo	KO (punch)	UFC 237	May 11, 2019	3	0:48	Rio de Janeiro, Brazil	
Win	6–3	Sarah Moras	Decision (unanimous)	UFC Fight Night: Volkan vs. Smith	October 27, 2018	3	5:00	Moncton, New Brunswick, Canada	
Loss	5–3	Irene Aldana	Decision (unanimous)	UFC Fight Night: Stephens vs. Choi	January 14, 2018	3	5:00	St. Louis, Missouri, United States	
Loss	5–2	Marion Reneau	TKO (punches)	UFC Fight Night: Volkov vs. Struve	September 2, 2017	3	4:54	Rotterdam, Netherlands	
Win	5–1	Irén Rácz	Submission (rear-naked choke)	Ladies Fight Night 5	April 8, 2017	1	4:09	Poznań, Poland	
Win	4–1	Gisele Moreira	Decision (unanimous)	Aspera FC 41	July 9, 2016	3	5:00	São José, Brazil	
Win	3–1	Priscila Cristina Dias Batista	Submission (armbar)	Rambo Fight	July 11, 2015	1	0:59	Rio das Ostras, Brazil	
Win	2–1	Lohanna Correia	Submission (armbar)	Maximus Fight 2	June 7, 2015	1	0:40	Rio Bonito, Brazil	
Loss	1–1	Juliana Velasquez	Decision (unanimous)	Face to Face 11	April 24, 2015	3	5:00	Rio de Janeiro, Brazil	Bantamweight debut.
Win	1–0	Nubia Santos do Nascimento	Submission (rear-naked choke)	Paraná Vale Tudo: Tamoios Fight	January 31, 2015	1	3:34	Cabo Frio, Brazil	Featherweight debut.

== See also ==
- List of female mixed martial artists
