= Lisa Spangler =

American MMA fighter

- Born: October 17, 1995 (age 31); Vancouver, Washington, United States
- Other names: The Strangler, Battle Angel
- Height: 5 ft 6 in (1.68 m)
- Weight: 155 lb (70 kg; 11 st 1 lb)
- Division: Bantamweight
- Reach: 68 in (173 cm)
- Fighting out of: Portland, Oregon, United States
- Team: Gracie Barra Portland
- Trainer: Rudy Garz - Boxing coach
- Years active: 2018–present

Mixed martial arts record
- Total: 8
- Wins: 6
- By decision: 6
- Losses: 2
- By decision: 2

Other information
- Mixed martial arts record from Sherdog

Lisa Spangler Verzosa (born October 17, 1995) is a mixed martial artist (MMA) from the United States, competing in the bantamweight division. She last competed for Invicta Fighting Championships (Invicta).

== Background ==
Spangler started playing football and competing in wrestling and karate when she was young, and transitioned to mixed martial arts at the age of 14 after joining Gladiator MMA gym in Vancouver.

== Mixed martial arts career ==
=== Early career ===
Spangler started her amateur MMA career since 2015 and fought almost primary under KOTC promotion. She amassed a record of 7-0 prior signed by Invicta.

=== Invicta Fighting Championships ===
Spangler made her Invicta debut on May 4, 2018 at Invicta FC 29: Kaufman vs. Lehner against Sarah Kleczka. She won the fight via unanimous decision.

=== CageSport MMA ===
Spangler face Kelly Clayton on July 2, 2018 at CageSport 52. She won the fight via majority decision.

=== Return to Invicta Fighting Championships ===
Spangler return to Invicta and faced Shanna Young on September 1, 2018, at Invicta FC 31: Jandiroba vs. Morandin, replacing Raquel Pa'aluhi. She won the fight via a split decision.

On June 7, 2019, Spangler face Katharina Lehner at Invicta FC 35: Bennett vs. Rodriguez II. She won the fight via unanimous decision.

Spangler faced Taneisha Tennant for the vacant Invicta FC Bantamweight Championship at Invicta FC 44: A New Era on August 27, 2021. Spangler lost a lop sided unanimous decision.

Spangler was scheduled to face Serena DeJesus on May 11, 2022 at Invicta FC 47.

== Mixed martial arts record ==
Professional record breakdown
8 matches	6 wins	2 losses
By decision	6	2

Res.	Record	Opponent	Method	Event	Date	Round	Time	Location	Notes
Loss	6–2	Taneisha Tennant	Decision (unanimous)	Invicta FC 44: A New Era	August 27, 2021	5	5:00	Kansas City, Kansas, United States	For the vacant Invicta FC Bantamweight Championship.
Win	6–1	Raquel Canuto	Decision (split)	Invicta FC 42: Cummins vs. Zappitella	September 17, 2020	3	5:00	Kansas City, Kansas, United States	
Loss	5–1	Julija Stoliarenko	Decision (split)	Invicta FC Phoenix Series 3	March 6, 2020	5	5:00	Kansas City, Kansas, United States	For the vacant Invicta FC Bantamweight Championship.
Win	5–0	Kerri Kenneson	Decision (unanimous)	Invicta FC 38: Murato vs. Ducote	November 1, 2019	3	5:00	Kansas City, Kansas, United States	
Win	4–0	Katharina Lehner	Decision (unanimous)	Invicta FC 35: Bennett vs. Rodriguez II	June 7, 2019	3	5:00	Kansas City, Kansas, United States	
Win	3–0	Shanna Young	Decision (split)	Invicta FC 31: Jandiroba vs. Morandin	September 1, 2018	3	5:00	Kansas City, Missouri, United States	
Win	2–0	Kelly Clayton	Decision (majority)	CageSport 52	July 21, 2018	3	5:00	Tacoma, Washington, United States	
Win	1–0	Sarah Kleczka	Decision (unanimous)	Invicta FC 29: Kaufman vs. Lehner	May 4, 2018	3	5:00	Kansas City, Missouri, United States	
