= Kansas City Scottish Rite Temple =

Coordinates: 39.069°N 94.567°W

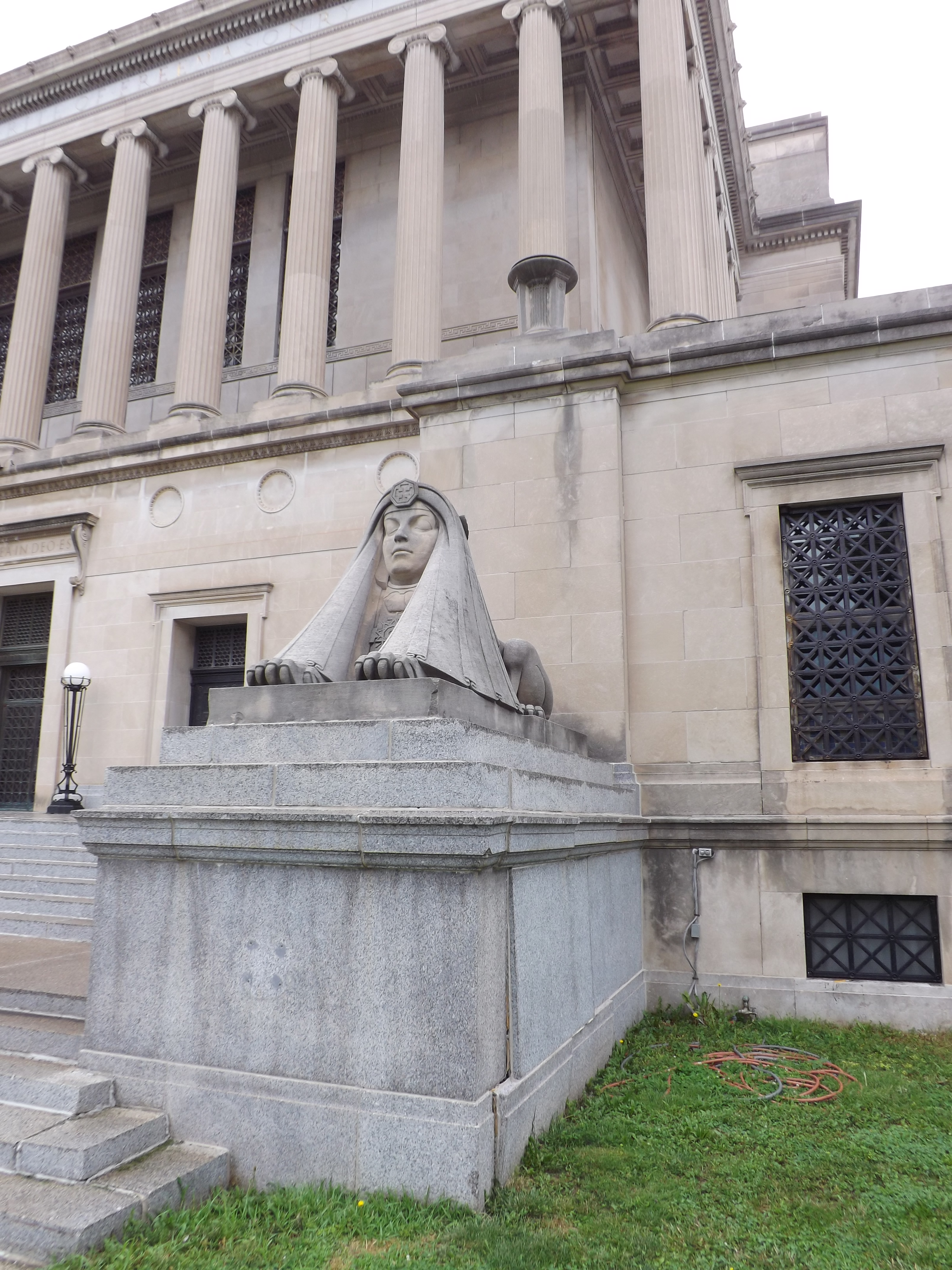
- The Scottish Rite Temple in 2015.

General information
- Location: 1330 E. Linwood Blvd., Kansas City, Missouri

The Kansas City Scottish Rite Temple is a monumental building in Kansas City, Missouri which was built during 1928-30. The architects were Keene & Simpson of Kansas City.

The building has a 102 by 112 feet (31 m × 34 m) 1,400-seat auditorium.

It was built on the site of the group's previous building at Linwood and Paseo Boulevard.

The group occupied the building from 1930 to 1940, and again from 1971 on.

== See also ==
- Scottish Rite Temple (Kansas City, Kansas), a 1908 building at 803 North 7th Street Trafficway
