= Invicta Fighting Championships =

American mixed martial arts promotion

- Type: Subsidiary
- Industry: Mixed martial arts promotion
- Founded: 2012; 14 years ago
- Founder: Shannon Knapp; Janet Martin
- Headquarters: Kansas City, Missouri, United States
- Area served: United States
- Key people: Shannon Knapp (president); Julie Kedzie (matchmaker); Amanda Nunes (matchmaker and athlete development team)
- Parent: Anthem Sports & Entertainment
- Website: invictafc.com

Invicta Fighting Championships, also known as Invicta FC, is an American professional mixed martial arts (MMA) promotion dedicated to women's mixed martial arts that was founded in 2012 by Janet Martin and Shannon Knapp. The promotion is currently owned by the Canadian-based Anthem Sports & Entertainment.

The company's name comes from the Latin word for "invincible and incomparable", which appears in the feminine form.

== History ==
=== Formation ===
After Zuffa, parent company of the UFC, purchased rival promotion Strikeforce in March 2011, Shannon Knapp received several calls from female fighters concerned about a possible lack of representation for women's MMA. Knapp would meet with Janet Martin and the two acquired the financial resources needed to launch a new MMA promotion.

The promotion held its first event, Invicta FC 1 on April 28, 2012. The event was headlined by a rematch between former Strikeforce women's bantamweight champion Marloes Coenen and French fighter Romy Ruyssen. The event also marked the MMA debut of 2008 Summer Olympics women's freestyle wrestling medalist Randi Miller.

On June 9, 2012, it was announced that Invicta has formed a strategic partnership with Japanese promotion JEWELS to cross-promote fighters on their respective cards in the United States and Japan. On September 24, Invicta would announce another cross-promotional partnership with the Super Fight League.

Invicta FC 6: Coenen vs. Cyborg, which took place on July 13, 2013, would mark the first event to be aired on cable and satellite pay-per-view, in addition to IPPV through a deal with Integrated Sports Media for live viewing. In 2014, Invicta began exclusively streaming events on UFC Fight Pass, with the company's fight library also made available on the service. Invicta FC 8 would be the first event to stream live on Fight Pass.

On February 24, 2015, Brazilian channel Combate acquired broadcast rights to Invicta live events as well as events from the Invicta library in South America.

=== Acquisition by Anthem ===
On April 15, 2021, it was announced that Anthem Sports & Entertainment had acquired Invicta. Starting with Invicta FC 44 on May 21, Invicta events are broadcast live on the Anthem-owned networks AXS TV and Fight Network in the United States and Canada, respectively. Invicta's events would also stream live on the promotion's YouTube channel.

On September 21, 2022, Invicta announced that it had made a deal with FOX Sports Mexico for Mexican broadcast rights, starting with Invicta FC 49.

On June 11, 2024, Invicta announced that it had signed a deal with CBS Sports to air all of that year's events on the CBS Sports Network in the United States, starting with Invicta FC 55 on June 28.

== Rules ==
Invicta's current rules follows the Unified Rules of Mixed Martial Arts that were originally established by the New Jersey State Athletic Control Board and modified by the Nevada State Athletic Commission.

== Events ==
=== Past events ===
#	Event	Date	Venue	Location	Ref
67	Invicta FC 62: Lehner vs. Rubin	May 16, 2025	The LEX at Municipal Auditorium	Kansas City, Missouri. U.S.	
66	Invicta FC 61: Ferreira vs. Palacios	April 4, 2025	Grand Casino Hotel & Resort	Shawnee, Oklahoma. U.S.	
65	Invicta FC 60: Rubin vs. Cantuária	February 7, 2025	Center Stage	Atlanta, Georgia. U.S.	
64	Invicta FC 59: Bernardo vs. Maia	December 13, 2024	The Eastern	Atlanta, Georgia. U.S.	
63	Invicta FC 58: Ducote vs. Ostroverkhova	November 6, 2024	Memorial Hall	Kansas City, Kansas. U.S.	
62	Invicta FC 57: Ferreira vs. Romero	September 20, 2024	Memorial Hall	Kansas City, Kansas. U.S.	
61	Invicta FC 56: Maia vs. Cantuária	August 9, 2024	Stockyards Event Center	Denver, Colorado. U.S.	
60	Invicta FC 55: Bernardo vs. Rubin	June 28, 2024	Memorial Hall	Kansas City, Kansas. U.S.	
59	Invicta FC 54: McCormack vs. Wojcik	October 27, 2023	Citizens House of Blues	Boston, Massachusetts, U.S.	
58	Invicta FC 53: DeCoursey vs. Dos Santos	May 3, 2023	ReelWorks Denver	Denver, Colorado, U.S.	
57	Invicta FC 52: Machado vs. McCormack	March 15, 2023	ReelWorks Denver	Denver, Colorado, U.S.	
56	Invicta FC 51: Tennant vs. Bernardo	January 18, 2023	ReelWorks Denver	Denver, Colorado, U.S.	
55	Invicta FC 50	November 16, 2022	ReelWorks Denver	Denver, Colorado, U.S.	
54	Invicta FC 49: Delboni vs. DeCoursey	September 28, 2022	Sugar Creek Casino	Hinton, Oklahoma, U.S.	
53	Invicta FC 48: Tennant vs. Rubin	July 20, 2022	ReelWorks Denver	Denver, Colorado, U.S.	
52	Invicta FC 47: Ducote vs. Zappitella	May 11, 2022	Memorial Hall	Kansas City, Kansas, U.S.	
51	Invicta FC 46: Rodríguez vs. Torquato II	March 9, 2022	Memorial Hall	Kansas City, Kansas, U.S.	
50	Invicta FC 45: Zappitella vs. Delboni II	January 12, 2022	Police Athletic League	Kansas City, Kansas, U.S.	
49	Invicta FC 44: A New Era	August 27, 2021	Memorial Hall	Kansas City, Kansas, U.S.	
48	Phoenix Tournament: Atomweight	June 11, 2021	Memorial Hall	Kansas City, Kansas, U.S.	
47	Invicta FC: Rodríguez vs. Torquato	May 21, 2021	Police Athletic League	Kansas City, Kansas, U.S.	
46	Invicta FC 43: King vs. Harrison	November 20, 2020	Police Athletic League	Kansas City, Kansas, U.S.	
45	Invicta FC 42: Cummins vs. Zappitella	September 17, 2020	Police Athletic League	Kansas City, Kansas, U.S.	
44	Invicta FC 41: Morandin vs. Ruiz	July 30, 2020	Police Athletic League	Kansas City, Kansas, U.S.	
43	Invicta FC 40: Ducote vs. Lima	July 2, 2020	Police Athletic League	Kansas City, Kansas, U.S.	
42	Phoenix Series 3	March 6, 2020	Memorial Hall	Kansas City, Kansas, U.S.	
41	Invicta FC 39: Frey vs. Cummins II	February 7, 2020	Memorial Hall	Kansas City, Kansas, U.S.	
40	Invicta FC 38: Murata vs. Ducote	November 1, 2019	Memorial Hall	Kansas City, Kansas, U.S.	
39	Invicta FC 37: Gonzalez vs. Sanchez	October 4, 2019	Memorial Hall	Kansas City, Kansas, U.S.	
38	Phoenix Series 2	September 6, 2019	Memorial Hall	Kansas City, Kansas, U.S.	
37	Invicta FC 36: Sorenson vs. Young	August 9, 2019	Memorial Hall	Kansas City, Kansas, U.S.	
36	Invicta FC 35: Bennett vs. Rodriguez II	June 7, 2019	Memorial Hall	Kansas City, Kansas, U.S.	
35	Phoenix Series 1	May 3, 2019	Memorial Hall	Kansas City, Kansas, U.S.	
34	Invicta FC 34: Porto vs. Gonzalez	February 15, 2019	Memorial Hall	Kansas City, Kansas, U.S.	
33	Invicta FC 33: Frey vs. Grusander II	December 15, 2018	Scottish Rite Temple	Kansas City, Missouri, U.S.	
32	Invicta FC 32: Spencer vs. Sorenson	November 16, 2018	Firelake Arena	Shawnee, Oklahoma, U.S.	
31	Invicta FC 31: Jandiroba vs. Morandin	September 1, 2018	Scottish Rite Temple	Kansas City, Missouri, U.S.	
30	Invicta FC 30: Frey vs. Grusander	July 21, 2018	Scottish Rite Temple	Kansas City, Missouri, U.S.	
29	Invicta FC 29: Kaufman vs. Lehner	May 4, 2018	Scottish Rite Temple	Kansas City, Missouri, U.S.	
28	Invicta FC 28: Mizuki vs. Jandiroba	March 24, 2018	Union Event Center	Salt Lake City, Utah, U.S.	
27	Invicta FC 27: Kaufman vs. Kianzad	January 13, 2018	Scottish Rite Temple	Kansas City, Missouri, U.S.	
26	Invicta FC 26: Maia vs. Niedźwiedź	December 8, 2017	Scottish Rite Temple	Kansas City, Missouri, U.S.	
25	Invicta FC 25: Kunitskaya vs. Pa'aluhi	August 31, 2017	Tachi Palace	Lemoore, California, U.S.	
24	Invicta FC 24: Dudieva vs. Borella	July 15, 2017	Scottish Rite Temple	Kansas City, Missouri, U.S.	
23	Invicta FC 23: Porto vs. Niedźwiedź	May 20, 2017	Scottish Rite Temple	Kansas City, Missouri, U.S.	
22	Invicta FC 22: Evinger vs. Kunitskaya II	March 25, 2017	Scottish Rite Temple	Kansas City, Missouri, U.S.	
21	Invicta FC 21: Anderson vs. Tweet	January 14, 2017	Scottish Rite Temple	Kansas City, Missouri, U.S.	
20	Invicta FC 20: Evinger vs. Kunitskaya	November 18, 2016	Scottish Rite Temple	Kansas City, Missouri, U.S.	
19	Invicta FC 19: Maia vs. Modafferi	September 23, 2016	Scottish Rite Temple	Kansas City, Missouri, U.S.	
18	Invicta FC 18: Grasso vs. Esquibel	July 29, 2016	Scottish Rite Temple	Kansas City, Missouri, U.S.	
17	Invicta FC 17: Evinger vs. Schneider	May 7, 2016	OC Fair & Event Center	Costa Mesa, California, U.S.	
16	Invicta FC 16: Hamasaki vs. Brown	March 11, 2016	Trinidad Pavilion	Las Vegas, Nevada, U.S.	
15	Invicta FC 15: Cyborg vs. Ibragimova	January 16, 2016	OC Fair & Event Center	Costa Mesa, California, U.S.	
14	Invicta FC 14: Evinger vs. Kianzad	September 12, 2015	Municipal Auditorium	Kansas City, Missouri, U.S.	
13	Invicta FC 13: Cyborg vs. Van Duin	July 9, 2015	The Cosmopolitan Resort & Casino	Las Vegas, Nevada, U.S.	
12	Invicta FC 12: Kankaanpää vs. Souza	April 24, 2015	Municipal Auditorium	Kansas City, Missouri, U.S.	
11	Invicta FC 11: Cyborg vs. Tweet	February 27, 2015	Shrine Expo Hall	Los Angeles, California, U.S.	
10	Invicta FC 10: Waterson vs. Tiburcio	December 5, 2014	Arena Theater	Houston, Texas, U.S.	
9	Invicta FC 9: Honchak vs. Hashi	November 1, 2014	RiverCenter	Davenport, Iowa, U.S.	
8	Invicta FC 8: Waterson vs. Tamada	September 6, 2014	Municipal Auditorium	Kansas City, Missouri, U.S.	
7	Invicta FC 7: Honchak vs. Smith	December 7, 2013	Ameristar Casino Kansas City	Kansas City, Missouri, U.S.	
6	Invicta FC 6: Coenen vs. Cyborg	July 13, 2013	Ameristar Casino Kansas City	Kansas City, Missouri, U.S.	
5	Invicta FC 5: Penne vs. Waterson	April 5, 2013	Ameristar Casino Kansas City	Kansas City, Missouri, U.S.	
4	Invicta FC 4: Esparza vs. Hyatt	January 5, 2013	Memorial Hall	Kansas City, Kansas, U.S.	
3	Invicta FC 3: Penne vs. Sugiyama	October 6, 2012	Memorial Hall	Kansas City, Kansas, U.S.	
2	Invicta FC 2: Baszler vs. McMann	July 28, 2012	Memorial Hall	Kansas City, Kansas, U.S.	
1	Invicta FC 1: Coenen vs. Ruyssen	April 28, 2012	Memorial Hall	Kansas City, Kansas, U.S.	

== Current champions ==
Division	Upper weight limit	Champion	Since	Title Defenses	Top Contender
Featherweight	145 lb (66 kg; 10.4 st)	Vacant	July 13, 2021		
Bantamweight	135 lb (61 kg; 9.6 st)	(Brazil) Jennifer Maia	December 13, 2024 (Invicta FC 59)		
Flyweight	125 lb (57 kg; 8.9 st)	Vacant	May 2, 2023		
Strawweight	115 lb (52 kg; 8.2 st)	Vacant	July 16, 2024		
Atomweight	105 lb (48 kg; 7.5 st)	(Brazil) Elisandra Ferreira	September 20, 2024 (Invicta FC 57)	1	

== Title history ==
=== Featherweight Championship ===
136 to 145 lbs (62 to 66 kg)

No.	Name	Event	Date	Reign	Defenses
1	(Brazil) Cris Cyborg def. Marloes Coenen	Invicta FC 6 Kansas City, MO, US	Jul 13, 2013	1351 days	1. def. Charmaine Tweet at Invicta FC 11 on Feb 27, 2015; 2. def. Faith Van Duin at Invicta FC 13 on Jul 9, 2015; 3. def. Daria Ibragimova at Invicta FC 15 on Jan 16, 2016
-	(Australia) Megan Anderson def. Charmaine Tweet for interim title	Invicta FC 21; Kansas City, MO, US	Jan 14, 2017	-	
Cyborg vacated the title on March 24, 2017 to compete full time with the UFC.
2	(Australia) Megan Anderson promoted to undisputed champion	Invicta FC 22; Kansas City, MO, US	Mar 24, 2017	88 days	
Anderson vacated the title on June 20, 2017 to sign with the Ultimate Fighting Championship.
3	(Canada) Felicia Spencer def. Pam Sorenson	Invicta FC 32; Shawnee, OK, US	Nov 16, 2018	129 days	
Spencer vacated the title on March 26, 2019 to sign with the Ultimate Fighting Championship
4	(United States) Pam Sorenson def. Kaitlin Young	Invicta FC 36; Kansas City, KS, US	Aug 9, 2019	705 days	
Sorenson vacated the title on July 13, 2021 to sign with Bellator MMA.

=== Bantamweight Championship ===
126 to 135 lbs (57 to 61 kg)

No.	Name	Event	Date	Reign	Defenses
1	(United States) Lauren Murphy def. Miriam Nakamoto	Invicta FC 7 Kansas City, MO, US	Dec 7, 2013	208 days	
Murphy vacated title on July 3, 2014 to sign with the UFC.
2	(United States) Tonya Evinger def. Irene Aldana	Invicta FC 13; Las Vegas, NV, US	Jul 9, 2015	724 days	1. def. Colleen Schneider at Invicta FC 17 on May 7, 2016; NC. vs. Yana Kunitskaya at Invicta FC 20 on Nov 18, 2016; 2. def. Yana Kunitskaya at Invicta FC 22 on Mar 25, 2017
Evinger had her defeat at Invicta FC 20 annulled on December 1, 2016 after proving that the referee took her out of a favorable position and remained champion.
Evinger vacated title on July 3, 2017 to sign with the Ultimate Fighting Championship.
3	(Russia) Yana Kunitskaya def. Raquel Pa'aluhi	Invicta FC 25; Lemoore, CA, US	Aug 31, 2017	160 days	
Kunitskaya vacated title on February 7, 2018 to sign with the Ultimate Fighting Championship.
4	(Canada) Sarah Kaufman def. Katharina Lehner	Invicta FC 29; Kansas City, MO, US	May 4, 2018	368 days	
Kaufman vacated title on May 9, 2019 to sign with the Professional Fighters League.
5	(Lithuania) Julija Stoliarenko def. Lisa Spangler	Invicta FC Phoenix Series 3 Kansas City, KS, USA	Mar 6, 2020	147 days	
Stoliarenko vacated title on July 31, 2020 to sign with the Ultimate Fighting Championship.
6	(United States) Taneisha Tennant def. Lisa Spangler	Invicta FC 44; Kansas City, KS, US	Aug 27, 2021	509 days	1. def. Olga Rubin at Invicta FC 48 on Jul 20, 2022
7	(Brazil) Talita Bernardo	Invicta FC 51; Denver, CO, US	Jan 18, 2023	684 days	1. def. Olga Rubin at Invicta FC 55 on Jun 28, 2024
8	(Brazil) Jennifer Maia	Invicta FC 59; Atlanta, GA, US	Dec 13, 2024	637 days (incumbent)	

=== Flyweight Championship ===
116 to 125 lbs (53 to 56 kg)

No.	Name	Event	Date	Reign	Defenses
1	(United States) Barb Honchak def. Vanessa Porto	Invicta FC 5 Kansas City, MO, US	Apr 5, 2013	1266 days	1. def. Leslie Smith at Invicta FC 7 on Dec 7, 2013; 2. def. Takayo Hashi at Invicta FC 9 on Nov 1, 2014
-	(Brazil) Jennifer Maia def. Vanessa Porto for interim title	Invicta FC 16; Las Vegas, NV, US	Mar 11, 2016	-	
Honchak was stripped of the title due to inactivity on September 22, 2016
2	(Brazil) Jennifer Maia promoted to undisputed champion	Invicta FC 19; Kansas City, MO, US	Sep 22, 2016	652 days	1. def. Roxanne Modafferi at Invicta FC 19 on Sep 23, 2016; 2. def. Agnieszka Niedźwiedź at Invicta FC 26 on Dec 8, 2017
Maia vacated title on July 7, 2018 to sign with the Ultimate Fighting Championship.
3	(Brazil) Vanessa Porto def. Pearl Gonzalez	Invicta FC 34; Kansas City, MO, USA	Feb 15, 2019	564 days	
Porto vacated title on September 2, 2020 to sign with Bellator MMA.
4	(Mexico) Karina Rodríguez def. Daiana Torquato	Invicta FC: Rodríguez vs. Torquato; Kansas City, KS, US	May 21, 2021	421 days	1. def. Daiana Torquato at Invicta FC 46 on Mar 9, 2022
Rodríguez vacated title on July 17, 2022 to sign with Bellator MMA.
5	(Brazil) Ketlen Souza def. Kristina Williams	Invicta FC 51; Denver, CO, USA	Jan 18, 2023	104 days	
Souza vacated title on May 2, 2023 to sign with the UFC.

=== Strawweight Championship ===
106 to 115 lbs (49 to 52 kg)

No.	Name	Event	Date	Reign	Defenses
1	(United States) Carla Esparza def. Bec Hyatt	Invicta FC 4 Kansas City, KS, U.S.	Jan 5, 2013	341 days	
Esparza vacated title on December 11, 2013 to participate in The Ultimate Fighter: A Champion Will Be Crowned.
2	(Finland) Katja Kankaanpää def. Stephanie Eggink	Invicta FC 8 Kansas City, MO, U.S.	Sep 6, 2014	230 days	
3	(Brazil) Lívia Renata Souza	Invicta FC 12; Kansas City, MO, U.S.	Apr 24, 2015	380 days	1. def. DeAnna Bennett at Invicta FC 15 on Jan 16, 2016
4	(United States) Angela Hill	Invicta FC 17; Costa Mesa, CA, U.S.	May 7, 2016	274 days	1. def. Kaline Medeiros at Invicta FC 20 on Nov 18, 2016
Hill vacated title on February 4, 2017 to return to the UFC.
5	(Brazil) Virna Jandiroba def. Mizuki Inoue	Invicta FC 28; Salt Lake City, UT, U.S.	Mar 24, 2018	379 days	1. def. Janaisa Morandin at Invicta FC 31 on Sep 1, 2018
Jandiroba vacated title on April 7, 2019 to sign with the UFC.
6	(United States) Brianna Van Buren def. Kailin Curran	Invicta Phoenix Series 1 Kansas City, KS, U.S.	May 3, 2019	39 days	
Van Buren vacated title on June 11, 2019 to sign with the UFC.
7	(Japan) Kanako Murata def. Emily Ducote	Invicta FC 38; Kansas City, KS, U.S.	Nov 1, 2019	305 days	
Murata vacated title on September 2, 2020 to sign with the UFC.
8	(United States) Emily Ducote def. Danielle Taylor	Invicta FC 44; Kansas City, KS, U.S.	Aug 27, 2021	279 days	1. def. Alesha Zappitella at Invicta FC 47 on May 11, 2022
Ducote vacated title on June 2, 2022 to sign with the UFC.
9	(Brazil) Valesca Machado def. Karolina Wójcik	Invicta FC 50; Denver, CO, U.S.	Nov 16, 2022	118 days	
10	(Republic of Ireland) Danni McCormack	Invicta FC 52; Denver, CO, U.S.	Mar 15, 2023	489 days	1. def. Karolina Wójcik at Invicta FC 54 on Oct 27, 2023
McCormack vacated title on July 16, 2024 to compete on the Road to UFC Season 3.

=== Atomweight Championship ===
96 to 105 lbs (44 to 48 kg)

No.	Name	Event	Date	Reign	Defenses
1	(United States) Jessica Penne def. Naho Sugiyama	Invicta FC 3 Kansas City, KS, U.S.	Oct 6, 2012	181 days	
2	(United States) Michelle Waterson	Invicta FC 5 Kansas City, MO, U.S.	Apr 5, 2013	609 days	1. def. Yasuko Tamada at Invicta FC 8 on Sep 6, 2014
3	(Brazil) Hérica Tibúrcio	Invicta FC 10; Houston, TX, U.S.	Dec 5, 2014	216 days	
4	(Japan) Ayaka Hamasaki	Invicta FC 13; Las Vegas, NV, U.S.	Jul 9, 2015	737 days	1. def. Amber Brown at Invicta FC 16 on Mar 11, 2016; 2. def. Jinh Yu Frey at Invicta FC 19 on Sep 23, 2016
Hamasaki vacated title on July 15, 2017 to sign with Rizin Fighting Federation.
5	(United States) Jinh Yu Frey def. Minna Grusander	Invicta FC 30; Kansas City, MO, U.S.	Jul 21, 2018	564 days	1. def. Minna Grusander at Invicta FC 33 on Dec 16, 2018
Frey was stripped of the title on February 6, 2020 after failing to make weight against Ashley Cummins at Invicta FC 39.
6	(United States) Alesha Zappitella def. Ashley Cummins	Invicta FC 42; Kansas City, KS, U.S.	Sep 17, 2020	482 days	1. def. Jéssica Delboni at Invicta FC on AXS TV: Rodríguez vs. Torquato on May 21, 2021
7	(Brazil) Jéssica Delboni	Invicta FC 45; Kansas City, KS, U.S.	Jan 12, 2022	258 days	
8	(United States) Jillian DeCoursey	Invicta FC 49; Hinton, OK, USA	Sep 28, 2022	215 days	
9	(Brazil) Rayanne dos Santos	Invicta FC 53; Denver, CO, USA	May 3, 2023	167 days	
Dos Santos vacated title on October 17, 2023 to sign with UFC.
10	(Brazil) Elisandra Ferreira	Invicta FC 57; Kansas City, KS, U.S.	Sep 20, 2024	721 days (incumbent)	1. def. Ana Palacios at Invicta FC 61 on April 4, 2025

== Records ==
=== Most wins in title bouts ===
Title wins	Champion	Division	V	D	NC	L
4	(Brazil) Cristiane Justino	Featherweight	4	0	0	0
4	(Brazil) Jennifer Maia	Flyweight/Bantamweight	4	0	0	0
3	(United States) Barb Honchak	Flyweight	3	0	0	0
3	(Japan) Ayaka Hamasaki	Atomweight	3	0	0	0

=== Most consecutive title defenses ===
Defenses	Champion	Division	Period
3	(Brazil) Cristiane Justino	Featherweight	July 12, 2013 – March 24, 2017

== Champions by nationality ==
The division champions include only linear and true champions. Interim champions who have never become linear champions will be listed as interim champions. Fighters with multiple title reigns in a specific division will also be counted once.

Country	Division champions	Interim champions	Total
United States	14	-	14
Brazil	11	-	11
Japan	2	-	2
Canada	2	-	2
Russia	1	-	1
Mexico	1	-	1
Australia	1	-	1
Ireland	1	-	1
Finland	1	-	1
Lithuania	1	-	1

== See also ==
- List of current Invicta FC fighters
- List of current mixed martial arts champions
- List of Bellator MMA champions
- List of EliteXC champions
- List of ONE Championship champions
- List of Pride champions
- List of PFL champions
- List of Strikeforce champions
- List of UFC champions
- List of WEC champions
- Mixed martial arts weight classes
