= Women's mixed martial arts =

Combat sport

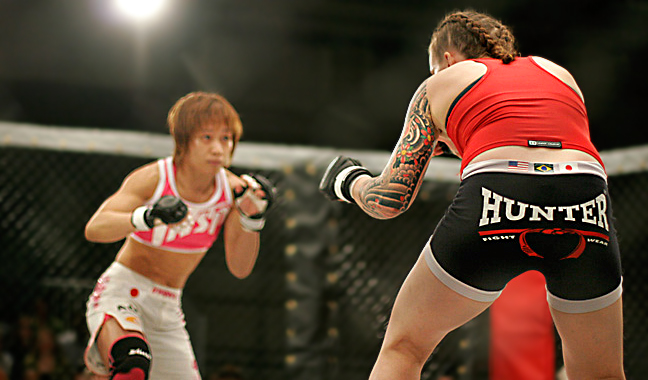
- Megumi Fujii (left) vs. Cody Welchlin (right)
- Focus: Various
- Hardness: Full contact
- Country of origin: Brazil and United states
- Olympic sport: No - not recognized by the IOC

While mixed martial arts is primarily a male dominated sport, it does have female athletes. For instance, Female competition in Japan includes promotions such as DEEP Jewels. Now defunct promotions that featured female fighters were Valkyrie, and Smackgirl. Professional mixed martial arts organizations in the United States that invite women to compete are industry leader Ultimate Fighting Championship, the all female Invicta Fighting Championships, Professional Fighters League, Resurrection Fighting Alliance and Legacy Fighting Championship. Now defunct promotions that featured female fighters were Strikeforce, Bellator Fighting Championships and EliteXC. There has been a growing awareness of women in mixed martial arts due to popular female fighters and personalities such as Amanda Nunes, Megumi Fujii, Gina Carano, Ronda Rousey, Miesha Tate, Holly Holm, Alexa Grasso, and Joanna Jędrzejczyk and among others. Carano became known as "the face of women's MMA" after appearing in a number of EliteXC events. This was furthered by her appearances on MGM Television's 2008 revival of their game show American Gladiators.

The UFC's decision to allow female fighters in the organization, to promote the dominant fighter Ronda Rousey, is often cited as the reason women's mixed martial arts became known to the general public. Rousey won the Best Fighter ESPY Award at the 2015 ESPN ESPY awards, beating out noted fighters such as Floyd Mayweather Jr., and becoming the first UFC and MMA fighter to win the award.

== History ==
=== The rise of women's MMA ===
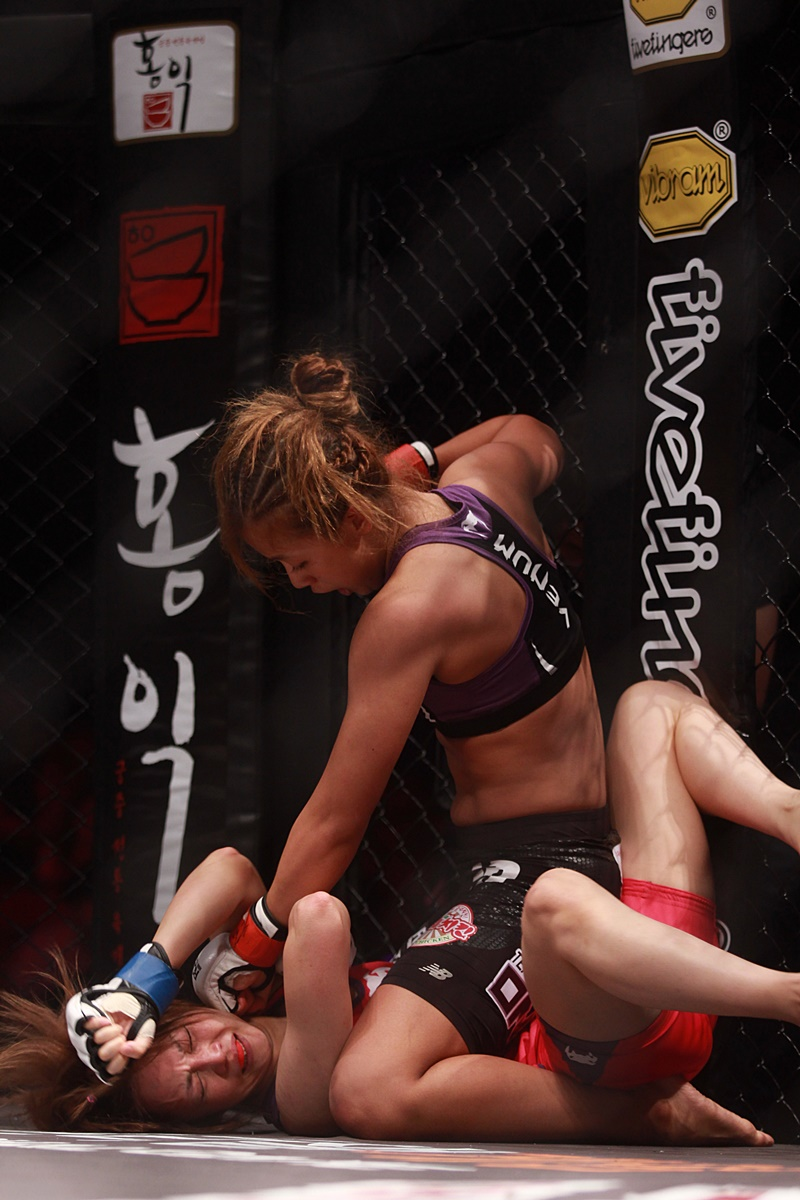

In Japan, female competition has been documented since the mid-1990s. Influenced by female professional wrestling and kickboxing, the Smackgirl competition was formed in 2001 and became the only major all-female promotion in mixed martial arts. Other early successful Japanese female organizations included Ladies Legend Pro-Wrestling, ReMix (a predecessor to Smackgirl), U-Top Tournament, K-Grace, and AX.

=== North America ===
In the United States, prior to the success of The Ultimate Fighter reality show that launched mixed martial arts into the mainstream media, there was little major coverage of female competitions. Some early organizations who invited women to compete included, International Fighting Championships, SuperBrawl, King of the Cage, Rage in the Cage, Ring of Combat, Bas Rutten Invitational, and HOOKnSHOOT. The first recorded American female competition was at an IFC 4 between Becky Levi and Betty Fagan on March 28, 1997. This was soon followed by an IFC four women tournament sanctioned by the Louisiana Boxing and Wrestling Commission on September 5, 1997 in Baton Rouge. In 2002, HOOKnSHOOT promoted an all women's card labeled ‘Revolution’. It was headlined by Debi Purcell and Christine Van Fleet. In 2005 they held an all-women, one-night-only tournament featuring Julie Kedzie, Jan Finney, and Lisa Ellis. From the mid-2000s, more coverage came when organizations such as Strikeforce, EliteXC, Bellator Fighting Championships, and Shark Fights invited women to compete.

Following Zuffa's acquisition of Strikeforce in March 2011, there has been much speculation concerning the future of women's competition, in term both of relevance and popularity.

The next step was for the Ultimate Fighting Championship (UFC) to pick up women's MMA, however UFC President Dana White was resistant. He has said, "There is not enough depth to create a women's division." However, Dana White warmed up to the idea of including women in the UFC and solely credits Ronda Rousey as the reason women are fighting in the UFC.

At the end of 2000s in Mexico, Ultimate Warrior Challenge Mexico (UWC), the oldest company in that country, hosted on May 30, 2009 an event called UWC: Furia Cacharilla that marked the first time there was a female combat in Mexican MMA. The protagonists were Margarita De La Cruz Ramírez and Cristina Marks, both debuting as professionals and with Ramírez taking the victory by submission.

=== Europe and Asia ===
In Europe some major organizations have held select female competitions, including It's Showtime, Shooto Europe, Cage Warriors in the United Kingdom, and M-1 Global, major MMA organization in Russia.

ONE Championship is the leading MMA promotion in Asia and hosts many female professional mixed martial arts bouts.

=== Africa ===
Africa's first female professional mixed martial arts bout was held in Johannesburg, South Africa in 2015. South Africa's Danella Eliasov defeated Zita Varju (Hungary) by first round submission.

== Rule differentiation ==
The traditional MMA rules have often been adjusted for female competitions because of safety concerns. In Japan, ReMix prohibited ground-and-pound and featured a 20-second time limit for ground fighting. This rule remained following ReMix's 2001 re-branding as Smackgirl, though the time limit was extended to 30 seconds. The rule was abolished in 2008.

In the United States, women's bouts organised by EliteXC saw three-minute rounds while those of Strikeforce were originally of two minutes' duration. These lengths compare to the more usual five minutes for men. Strikeforce later changed this rule to allow for five-minute rounds.

Another form of rule differentiation is a change in both weight limits and weight classification. This has been seen in a number of organizations including, Strikeforce, Smackgirl, and Valkyrie.

While men are required to wear a groin protector, women are forbidden from doing so. Women must wear a top and chest protector, while men are allowed neither.

== Milestones ==
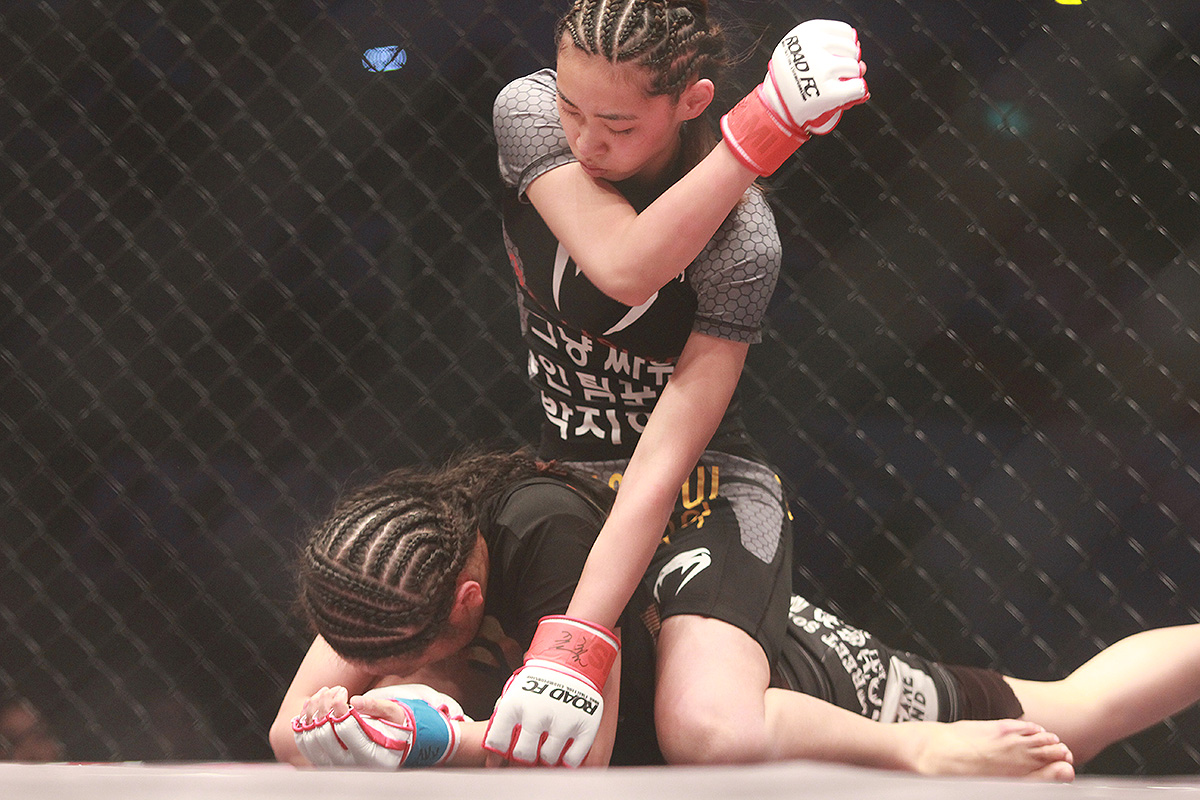

First female MMA fight in United States held on March 28, 1997 by the International Fighting Championships between Becky Levi and Betty Fagan.

Strikeforce became the first major promotion in the United States to have held a female fight as the main event on August 15, 2009. The fight between Gina Carano and Cristiane Santos, known professionally as Cris Cyborg, attracted 856,000 viewers. Santos made history with her victory over Carano as she became the first Strikeforce Women's 145 lb Champion.

Invicta Fighting Championships in early 2012 became one of the first major women's pro mma organisations.

Ronda Rousey became the first woman fighter signed to the UFC in November 2012, and was promoted to the division's bantamweight champion. She successfully defended her title in the first UFC women's fight against Liz Carmouche at UFC 157.

Miesha Tate and Cat Zingano fought at the Ultimate Fighter 17 Finale on April 13.

On December 11, 2013 the UFC picked up the contracts of 11 female fighters to fill up their 115-pound division. The Strawweights took part in the 20th season of The Ultimate Fighter, the season winner will be the first UFC women's strawweight champion. Some of the fighters include Felice Herrig, Claudia Gadelha, Tecia Torres, Bec Hyatt, Joanne Calderwood, and even Invicta FC's Strawweight Champion Carla Esparza and many more.

Carla Esparza became the first UFC strawweight champion after defeating Rose Namajunas at The Ultimate Fighter: A Champion Will Be Crowned finale.

Esparza lost her title to Joanna Jędrzejczyk at UFC 185.

== Disagreement and pay issues with women's MMA ==
Since its inception the role of women in mixed martial arts has been a subject of debate. Some observers have treated women's competition as a spectacle and a taboo topic.

Mixed martial arts (MMA) fights have become increasingly popular among women. Women fighters needed to be represented and marketed with more equality for a while. The average pay for women at the time was $15,000, compared to men's $38,000 per fight, which led to a lot of women being frustrated with their pay. Paige VanZant who is an MMA fighter spoke out about wage inequality in 2019 and said she wanted more money to "keep bleeding and sacrificing for this sport". US women's soccer players took legal action over the fact that their pay is significantly lower than men's. During the UFC 241 event, the highest-paid man earned $700,000, while the highest-paid female fighter earned $30,000 according to FINCHANNEL statistics. The top female earner in 2020 was Amanda Nunes, who earned $350,000 plus $100,000 if she won the fight. Conor McGregor is thought to have gotten about $3 million for each of his most recent fights. Another male MMA fighter, Alistair Overeem has recently been paid $800,000 for each match he has. Dana White, who is the president of the UFC stated that he would never allow women to compete in his organization. Although, after observing how many viewers are watching women's fights, he has since acknowledged that female athletes are "very good." Women are requesting more money from the UFC as more viewers start to watch women's fights. Female MMA fighters' earning potential has grown as they gain popularity and recognition. Even though it has changed, the most well-liked male fighters like Conor Mcgregor continue to attract larger audiences and earn more money although it definitely won't be long until women are just as popular, and it is truly equal.

== See also ==
- Mixed martial arts
- List of female mixed martial artists

== Bibliography ==
- Global Perspectives on Women in Combat Sports:Women Warriors around the World, Alex Channon, Palgrave Macmillan, August 2015, ISBN 9781137439352
