= Miesha Tate vs. Ronda Rousey =

MMA bouts between Miesha Tate and Ronda Rousey

Tale of the Tape
- Date: March 3, 2012 (1st Fight) December 28, 2013 (2nd Fight)
- Title(s) on the line: Strikeforce Women's Bantamweight Championship (1st Fight) UFC Bantamweight Championship (2nd Fight)

Tale of the tape
Boxer	(United States) Miesha Tate	(United States) Ronda Rousey
Nickname	"Cupcake"	"Rowdy"
Hometown	Tacoma, Washington	Riverside County, California
Pre-fight record	18-6	12-0
Height	1.69 m (5 ft 6 1/2 in)	1.70 m (5 ft 7 in)
Weight	135 lb (61 kg; 9.6 st)	135 lb (61 kg; 9.6 st)
Style	Wrestling; Brazilian Jiu-Jitsu	Judo
Recognition	Strikeforce Women’s Bantamweight Champion (1st fight) Challenger (2nd fight)	Challenger (1st fight) UFC Bantamweight Champion (2nd fight)

Miesha Tate vs. Ronda Rousey was a series of mixed martial arts bouts booked by Strikeforce and the Ultimate Fighting Championship (UFC). In 2011, the fighters began a rivalry via social media and a series of interviews, with Rousey expressing an interest in fighting Tate for Tate's Strikeforce Women's Bantamweight Championship. As the feud garnered increased attention from fans and the press, Tate and Rousey were ultimately chosen to headline a Strikeforce show on March 3, 2012. This marked a rare occurrence of women being placed in the main event of a mixed martial arts (MMA) card.

In making the transition to MMA, Rousey, a decorated judoka, employed a combination of judo and jiu-jitsu. Tate, an accomplished wrestler, utilized ground control to set up technical knockouts or submissions. In the pair's first bout, Rousey defeated Tate via armbar submission following a competitive round of grappling. Upon making the transition to the UFC, Rousey and Tate were eventually booked for a rematch in 2013.

The rivalry holds a significant place in MMA history, as it is credited with bringing women's MMA to the sport's premier promotion, the Ultimate Fighting Championship. Though Tate and Rousey maintained an ostensibly heated feud, the fighters often expressed respect for each other as competitors.

From July 2011 to December 2016, all fights for the Strikeforce and UFC bantamweight titles featured Tate, Rousey, or both.

== Background ==
Prior to her debut in mixed martial arts (MMA), Ronda Rousey earned multiple titles while competing in judo. She won the gold medal at the Pan American Championships in 2004 and 2005, the silver medal at the world championships in 2007, and the bronze medal at the Summer Olympic Games in 2008, where she became the first American woman to ever medal in Olympic judo. She is also a five-time national champion in the United States.

Miesha Tate began competing in amateur wrestling while in high school, winning the state championship in Washington in 2005. She went on to win a national grappling championship at the 2008 World Team Trials, and a silver medal at the 2008 FILA Worlds Grappling Championship. She made her professional MMA debut at the Hook 'n' Shoot Bodog tournament in 2007, defeating Jan Finney by decision. Tate won the 135-pound championship of the Freestyle Cage Fighting promotion in 2009, submitting Liz Carriero. She went on to win the Strikeforce Women's Bantamweight Championship, also a 135-pound title, on July 30, 2011, submitting Marloes Coenen with an arm-triangle choke.

Rousey made her pro MMA debut in March 2011, and finished each of her opponents throughout the year by first-round armbar submission. After defeating her fourth opponent, Julia Budd, at a Strikeforce event in November, Rousey (then fighting at 145 pounds) declared her intentions to challenge Tate for the bantamweight championship.

At the time, Sarah Kaufman was considered the no. 1 contender for Tate's title. Rousey offered to fight Kaufman for the top contender spot, stating that she wanted a title shot against Tate specifically. While discussing Tate in a later interview, Rousey explained "I kind of created this rivalry on purpose because I had enough friends, and I really could use a few enemies. And the result of how much attention this fight's been getting, that just proves me right." She also claimed that the challenge was not personal. In late 2011, Strikeforce announced that Tate vs. Rousey would take place in early 2012.

== First fight ==
=== Lead up ===
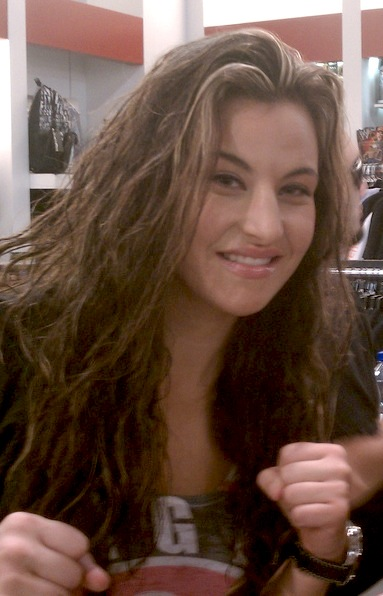
Miesha Tate

During the months leading up to their fight, Tate and Rousey began feuding via interviews and social media. Tate stated that she did not believe Rousey deserved a title shot, and felt that Rousey was more interested in self-promotion than in promoting women's mixed martial arts.

The animosity between the two eventually led to a variety of trash-talk. While discussing Tate's performance against Coenen, Rousey stated, "To be honest, every time I study that tape, I have to take breaks in the middle because I'm just bored."

Tate declared that most of the media attention surrounding Rousey was due to Rousey being "pretty." She also claimed that Rousey hadn't been truly tested in her career, stating, "She's been carefully matched, she’s been pampered and she’s been protected. The truth is, going into this world title fight with me, Ronda is still to discover whether she is even a real fighter."

While addressing the rivalry in general, Rousey eventually noted, "I think that if we met under different circumstances, if things weren't the way they were, we probably would've ended up being friends. I think that the person that you're fighting, you have more in common with than anyone else in the room."

=== Strikeforce: Tate vs. Rousey ===
Tate and Rousey fought for the first time on March 3, 2012 at Nationwide Arena in Columbus, Ohio. The main event marked the first occasion on which women had headlined an MMA card since Gina Carano fought Cristiane Santos in 2009. In the opening minute of the fight, Rousey attempted to lock Tate in an armbar. However, Tate escaped the hold and retaliated with strikes. Following a back-and-forth session of grappling, Rousey secured a second armbar during the final minute of the first round, forcing Tate to submit at 4:27, and becoming the new bantamweight champion.

After the fight, Tate drew a degree of criticism for risking long-term damage to her arm by resisting the armbar for several moments. At a press conference, Rousey stated, "Miesha impressed me, she’s a tough chick 'cause that hurts. I’ve had my elbow dislocated before and that’s no fun. The rule in judo is even if it’s dislocated if they don’t tap, then keep going."

== Second fight ==
=== Lead up ===
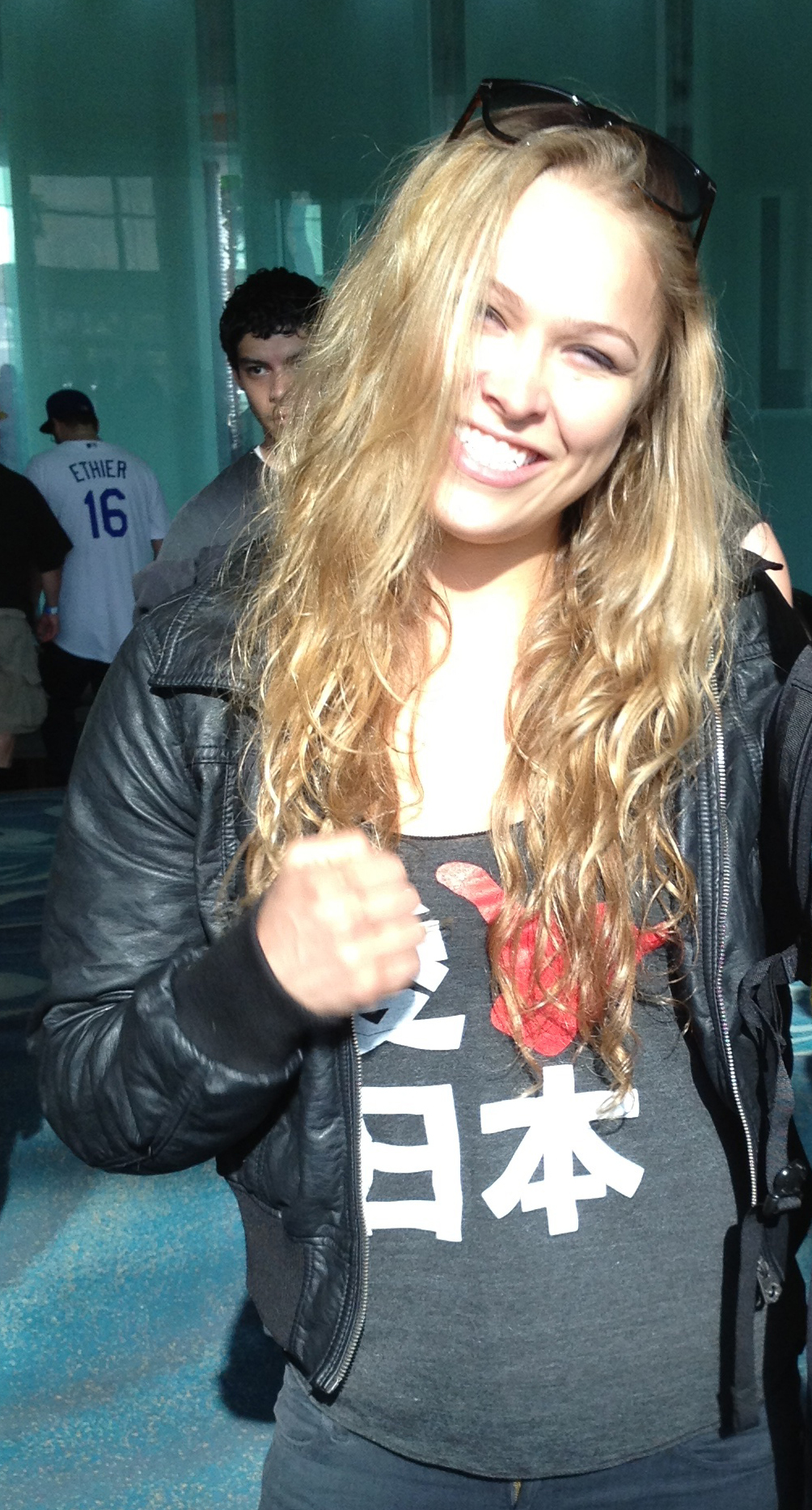
Ronda Rousey

Following Strikeforce's fold in early 2013, Rousey and Tate joined the Ultimate Fighting Championship (UFC). As both promotions were owned by Zuffa LLC, Rousey was made the inaugural UFC Women's Bantamweight Champion. On February 23, 2013, she successfully defended her title against Liz Carmouche at UFC 157. On April 13, Tate made her UFC debut against Cat Zingano. Prior to this bout, it was announced that the winner of Tate vs. Zingano would receive a shot at the bantamweight title, as well as a coaching position opposite Rousey on The Ultimate Fighter.

Zingano won the fight by third-round TKO, with Tate arguing that the stoppage was premature. Rousey later revealed that she agreed with Tate's stance on the matter. On May 28, the UFC announced that Zingano had withdrawn from her coaching opportunity and title shot due to a knee injury, and that Tate would replace her.

Following the change of opponents, Rousey shared her thoughts on the new situation:

I’ve always respected Miesha as a fighter and an athlete. How we feel personally really has nothing to do with that. I think she’s entirely legit, but I don’t really feel bad about hitting her. It’s going to be really interesting for all of the fans who have kept up with [our] rivalry up to this point, and it will be really exciting for people who are learning of it for the first time. I’m actually honored to be coaching opposed her on the show, and I think this is really what was fated to happen. I’m really lucky to have a rival like her.

Tate said, "We have our definite disagreements, but I give her credit for what she’s done and where she’s got in the sport of women’s MMA. Without her, I don’t think we’d be as far so I do value that. But at the same time, I feel like I’m right on her heels, and I want what she has. I want the UFC belt. I want my team to win the show, and I want to be able to say that at the end of the day—to look her in the face and say, 'I've beaten Ronda Rousey.' "

While reflecting on the first bout, Tate claimed that she'd become too emotional beforehand. "In the fight against Ronda, I went in there to beat her up, not win an MMA match. I [made] mistakes, my head wasn't where it needed to be, and I got beat," she said. However, she ultimately expressed respect for Rousey's fighting ability, and stated that she would focus strictly on becoming a champion again in the second bout.

Rousey declared that she would prepare for the best Miesha Tate possible in their rematch.

=== Rousey vs. Tate 2 ===
In their rematch at UFC 168 on December 28, 2013, Rousey defeated Tate by submission at 0:58 in round 3. Tate managed to escape several of Rousey's submission holds in the first two rounds, thus making her the first to ever reach the second and third round against Rousey.

== Impact ==
Rousey and Tate featured in promotional art for EA Sports UFC

Tate and Rousey's rivalry is credited with bringing women's mixed martial arts to the Ultimate Fighting Championship, with UFC president Dana White confirming this during a 2012 interview.

In 2013, EA Sports announced that Rousey and Tate were the first-ever female fighters selected for inclusion in a UFC video game. The two also appeared together on ESPN's SportsCenter while promoting their rematch. In an interview with Yahoo!, Rousey stated, "I think people will look back at this as one of the monumental rivalries", and as "one of those things that really cemented women's MMA."

In November 2015, Holly Holm defeated Rousey for the UFC Bantamweight Championship. Tate won the title from Holm the following March, but lost it to Amanda Nunes in July 2016. Following a loss to Raquel Pennington at UFC 205 in November 2016, Tate announced her retirement from mixed martial arts. A month later in December, Rousey attempted to take the title from Nunes but was defeated, and retired shortly afterward.
