= Sarah D'Alelio =

American mixed martial artist

- Born: December 13, 1980 (age 45); Belfast, Maine, United States
- Nickname: The Monster
- Height: 5 ft 7 in (170 cm)
- Weight: 135 lb (61 kg; 9 st 9 lb)
- Reach: 66.5 in (169 cm)
- Fighting out of: Olympia, Washington, United States
- Team: Olympia Jiu-Jitsu; Combat Sports Academy
- Years active: 2009–2017 (MMA)

Mixed martial arts record
- Total: 18
- Wins: 11
- By knockout: 1
- By submission: 8
- By decision: 2
- Losses: 7
- By knockout: 1
- By submission: 2
- By decision: 4

Other information
- Mixed martial arts record from Sherdog

Sarah D'Alelio (born December 13, 1980) is a professional mixed martial artist. She competed in the 135-pound women's bantamweight division for Invicta Fighting Championships and has also fought for Strikeforce.

== Mixed martial arts career ==
=== Jackson's MMA Series ===
D'Alelio was scheduled to face Julie Kedzie at Jackson's MMA Series 2 on September 4, 2010, but the fight was canceled after Kedzie signed on to take part in the filming of the Ultimate Women Challenge reality show.

D'Alelio's fight with Kedzie was then rebooked for Jackson's MMA Series 3 on December 18, 2010, in Albuquerque, New Mexico. She lost to Kedzie via unanimous decision.

=== Strikeforce ===
Strikeforce announced at its April 9, 2011, event in San Diego that Gina Carano would make her return on June 18 at the American Airlines Center in Dallas, Texas, during the Overeem vs. Werdum Strikeforce event against D'Alelio. Initially, Strikeforce announced that Carano had failed her pre-fight medical examination due to an unknown issue and the fight was pulled from the card. As the story developed, it became public that Carano was medically cleared by the Athletic Commission but was removed from the card for unknown reasons.

D'Alelio was then scheduled to make her Strikeforce debut against Ronda Rousey on July 30, 2011, at Strikeforce: Fedor vs. Henderson in Hoffman Estates, Illinois. The fight was pushed back and eventually took place on the Strikeforce Challengers 18 main card on August 12, 2011, in Las Vegas, Nevada. Rousey defeated D'Alelio by technical submission due to an armbar early in the first round. D'Alelio contended that she did not verbally tap out and that the fight was prematurely stopped by the referee (Steve Mazzagatti).

=== Invicta Fighting Championships ===
D'Alelio made her Invicta FC debut at Invicta FC 1: Coenen vs. Ruyssen against Vanessa Mariscal, winning via submission (punches) in the second round.

She then fought and defeated Vanessa Porto via submission (reverse triangle armbar) in round one at Invicta FC 2: Baszler vs. McMann on July 28, 2012.

D'Alelio faced Shayna Baszler at Invicta FC 3: Penne vs. Sugiyama on October 6, 2012. She lost the fight via submission due to a rear-naked choke early in round two.

On January 5, 2013, D'Alelio faced Amanda Nunes at Invicta FC 4: Esparza vs. Hyatt. D'Alelio won the fight via unanimous decision.

D'Alelio faced Lauren Taylor at Invicta FC 6: Coenen vs. Cyborg on July 13, 2013. D'Alelio lost the close fight via unanimous decision.

At Invicta FC 7, D'Alelio replaced Kelly Kobold in a fight against Tonya Evinger. D'Alelio lost the fight via unanimous decision.

D'Alelio was booked to face Rin Nakai at Pancrase: 258 on May 11, 2014. She lost the fight by unanimous decision.

=== Bellator MMA ===
D'Alelio made her Bellator MMA debut at Bellator 165 on November 19, 2016. She faced Jamielene Nievera and won the fight via submission in the second round.

D'Alelio faced Roxanne Modafferi at Invicta FC 23: Porto vs. Niedźwiedź on May 20, 2017. She lost the fight by a third-round technical knockout.

== Mixed martial arts record ==
Professional record breakdown
18 matches	11 wins	7 losses
By knockout	1	1
By submission	8	2
By decision	2	4

Res.	Record	Opponent	Method	Event	Date	Round	Time	Location	Notes
Loss	11–7	Roxanne Modafferi	TKO (elbows)	Invicta FC 23: Porto vs. Niedźwiedź	May 20, 2017	3	1:37	Kansas City, Missouri, United States	
Win	11–6	Jamielene Nievera	Submission (armbar)	Bellator 165	November 19, 2016	2	4:46	San Jose, California, United States	
Win	10–6	Jenny Liou	Decision (unanimous)	Super Fight League 50	July 23, 2016	3	5:00	Tacoma, Washington, United States	
Win	9–6	Andrea Lee	Submission (rear-naked choke)	Invicta FC 16: Hamasaki vs. Brown	March 11, 2016	3	4:21	Las Vegas, Nevada, United States	
Win	8–6	Christina Marks	Submission (rear-naked choke)	BAMMA USA: Badbeat 14	January 9, 2015	1	4:38	Commerce, California, United States	
Loss	7–6	Rin Nakai	Decision (unanimous)	Pancrase: 258	May 11, 2014	3	5:00	Tokyo, Japan	For the Pancrase Women's Bantamweight Championship.
Loss	7–5	Tonya Evinger	Decision (unanimous)	Invicta FC 7: Honchak vs. Smith	December 7, 2013	3	5:00	Kansas City, Missouri, United States	
Loss	7–4	Lauren Taylor	Decision (unanimous)	Invicta FC 6: Coenen vs. Cyborg	July 13, 2013	3	5:00	Kansas City, Missouri, United States	
Win	7–3	Amanda Nunes	Decision (unanimous)	Invicta FC 4: Esparza vs. Hyatt	January 5, 2013	3	5:00	Kansas City, Kansas, United States	
Loss	6–3	Shayna Baszler	Submission (rear-naked choke)	Invicta FC 3: Penne vs. Sugiyama	October 6, 2012	2	0:37	Kansas City, Kansas, United States	
Win	6–2	Vanessa Porto	Submission (reverse triangle armbar)	Invicta FC 2: Baszler vs. McMann	July 28, 2012	1	3:16	Kansas City, Kansas, United States	
Win	5–2	Vanessa Mariscal	Submission (punches)	Invicta FC 1: Coenen vs. Ruyssen	April 28, 2012	2	3:19	Kansas City, Kansas, United States	Invicta FC Debut
Loss	4–2	Ronda Rousey	Verbal Submission (armbar)	Strikeforce Challengers: Gurgel vs. Duarte	August 12, 2011	1	0:25	Las Vegas, Nevada, United States	
Loss	4–1	Julie Kedzie	Decision (unanimous)	Jackson's MMA Series 3	December 18, 2010	3	5:00	Albuquerque, New Mexico, United States	
Win	4–0	Raquel Pa'aluhi	Submission (armbar)	X-1: Heroes	September 11, 2010	1	2:13	Honolulu, Hawaii, United States	
Win	3–0	Melissa Steele	TKO (punches)	CageSport 11	July 24, 2010	1	1:25	Tacoma, Washington, United States	
Win	2–0	Colleen Schneider	Submission (rear-naked choke)	FE: Arctic Combat 2	March 19, 2010	2	N/A	Fairbanks, Alaska, United States	
Win	1–0	Sarah Oriza	Submission (guillotine choke)	CageSport 9	February 20, 2010	1	0:29	Tacoma, Washington, United States	

== See also ==
- List of female mixed martial artists
