= Strikeforce: Fedor vs. Henderson =

Strikeforce mixed martial arts event in 2011

- The poster for Strikeforce: Fedor vs. Henderson
- Promotion: Strikeforce; M-1 Global
- Date: July 30, 2011
- Venue: Sears Center
- City: Hoffman Estates, Illinois, United States

Event chronology
Strikeforce: Overeem vs. Werdum	Strikeforce: Fedor vs. Henderson	Strikeforce: Barnett vs. Kharitonov

Strikeforce/M-1 Global: Fedor vs. Henderson was a mixed martial arts event held by Strikeforce in association with M-1 Global. It took place on July 30, 2011 at Sears Center in Hoffman Estates, Illinois, United States.

== Background ==
A planned bout between Rafael Cavalcante and Ovince St. Preux at this event was later scrapped from the card

Evangelista Santos was originally scheduled to fight Tarec Saffiedine at this event. However, Saffiedine was pulled from the bout and replaced by Paul Daley. Soon afterwards, Santos was forced out of the bout with Daley due to a shoulder injury. Undefeated welterweight Tyron Woodley stepped in to replace Santos against Daley. Meanwhile, Saffiedine was moved to a bout with Scott Smith at this event.

Roger Gracie was originally scheduled to face Muhammed Lawal at the event. However, the bout was rescheduled for Strikeforce World Grand Prix: Barnett vs. Kharitonov that September after Gracie suffered a training injury. Lawal won the rescheduled bout by first round KO.

Ronda Rousey and Sarah D'Alelio were originally scheduled to fight on this card, but their bout was later moved to Strikeforce Challengers: Gurgel vs. Duarte.

Lyle Beerbohm was originally scheduled to face Gesias Cavalcante, but was replaced by Bobby Green on July 19, 2011.

The bout between Marloes Coenen and Miesha Tate was originally scheduled to be for the Women's Welterweight belt, but it was renamed to a Women's Bantamweight Championship bout by Zuffa to achieve consistency with the weight class names in the promotion.

With Fedor Emelianenko's departure from Strikeforce following this event, this was the last Strikeforce event to be co-promoted by his promotional team M-1 Global.

This was the last Strikeforce event featuring Gus Johnson on lead commentary. Strikeforce Challengers color commentator Pat Miletich replaced him on the promotion's main broadcast team at subsequent events, with Mauro Ranallo shifting to full play-by-play duties.

== Results ==
Main card
Weight class				Method	Round	Time	Notes
Heavyweight	Dan Henderson	def.	Fedor Emelianenko	TKO (punches)	1	4:12
Women's Bantamweight	Miesha Tate	def.	Marloes Coenen (c)	Submission (arm triangle choke)	4	3:03	(Note: For the Strikeforce Women's Bantamweight Championship.)
Welterweight	Tyron Woodley	def.	Paul Daley	Decision (unanimous) (29–28, 29–28, 29–28)	3	5:00
Middleweight	Tim Kennedy	def.	Robbie Lawler	Decision (unanimous) (30–27, 30–27, 30–27)	3	5:00
Welterweight	Tarec Saffiedine	def.	Scott Smith	Decision (unanimous) (30–27, 30–27, 30–26)	3	5:00
Preliminary card
Lightweight	Gesias Cavalcante	def.	Bobby Green	Decision (split) (29–28, 29–28, 28–29)	3	5:00
Middleweight	Derek Brunson	def.	Lumumba Sayers	Submission (rear-naked choke)	1	4:33
Women's Bantamweight	Alexis Davis	def.	Julie Kedzie	Decision (unanimous) (30–27, 30–27, 29–28)	3	5:00
Welterweight	Tyler Stinson	def.	Eduardo Pamplona	KO (punch)	1	0:15
Heavyweight	Gabriel Salinas-Jones	def.	Bryan Humes	Submission (D'arce choke)	3	1:19
