= Kaitlin Young =

American mixed martial arts fighter

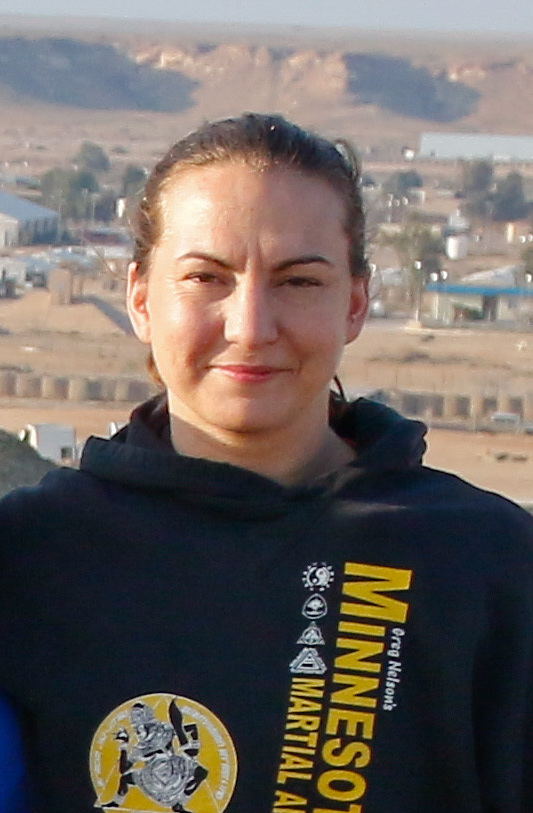
- Born: September 15, 1985 (age 41); Circle Pines, Minnesota, U.S.
- Other names: Striking Viking
- Height: 5 ft 9 in (1.75 m)
- Weight: 146 lb (66 kg; 10.4 st)
- Division: Featherweight
- Style: Muay Thai, Taekwondo, BJJ
- Fighting out of: Circle Pines, Minnesota
- Team: Minnesota Martial Arts Academy (2005–2019); Striking Institute/ M-Theory Martial Arts (2019–present); Striking Institute (2020–present)
- Rank: Black belt in Taekwondo; Brown belt in Brazilian jiu-jitsu under Ishmael Bentley
- Years active: 2007–2022

Mixed martial arts record
- Total: 26
- Wins: 12
- By knockout: 8
- By decision: 4
- Losses: 13
- By knockout: 4
- By submission: 3
- By decision: 6
- Draws: 1

Other information
- Mixed martial arts record from Sherdog

Kaitlin Young (born September 15, 1985) is an American former mixed martial artist who last competed in the lightweight division. A professional mixed martial artist since 2007, Young has also competed for EliteXC, Invicta Fighting Championships, and Professional Fighters League (PFL)

== Biography ==
Young began training in martial arts at age 14, where she explored her interest in taekwondo and earned a black belt.

After attending a taekwondo national conference, Young discovered Thai boxing. She signed up for classes at the Minnesota Martial Arts Academy after attending a Thai boxing event.

Graduating at the top of her class from Centennial High School in 2004, Young subsequently enrolled in the University of Minnesota, with a major in kinesiology.

== Mixed martial arts career ==
Young rose to fame after winning the one-night 2007 HOOKnSHOOT Women's Grand Prix with three knockouts in a combined time of just 1:45.

She then faced Sarah Schneider at Tuff-N-Uff: "Thompson vs. Troyer" on February 1, 2008, but was defeated by a second-round armbar.

On May 31, 2008, Young was defeated by Gina Carano at EliteXC: Primetime on CBS after the second round when the ringside physician declared her unable to continue.

Young returned to MMA competition on December 11, 2009, but lost to Shana Olsen via second-round technical knock out. Olsen had missed weight for the fight.

Young entered the Freestyle Cage Fighting Women's Bantamweight Grand Prix at FCF 39 on January 30, 2010 in Shawnee, Oklahoma. She was defeated by Jennifer Tate in the second round of their quarterfinal bout.

Young was set to face Jamie Seaton in the co-main event at Crowbar MMA: "Fall Brawl" on September 11, 2010, but Seaton withdrew from the fight. Young was then matched up against Liz Carmouche, but the fight was cancelled after Young signed on to take part in the filming of the Ultimate Women Challenge reality show. After the show never made it to air, Young and 6 other contestants sued the producers, claiming they were never paid.

During the filming of the Ultimate Women Challenge, Young faced Julie Kedzie on September 24, 2010. She defeated Kedzie by split decision.

Young faced Kedzie again in a five-round title rematch at Jackson's MMA Series 4 on April 9, 2011 in Albuquerque, New Mexico. She was defeated by unanimous decision.

Young was scheduled to face Jan Finney in the main event of Freestyle Cage Fighting 49 on October 1. However, Finney withdrew from the fight and Young faced Liz Carreiro instead. She defeated Carreiro by TKO late in the first round.

Young agreed to face Milana Dudieva at ProFC 37 on November 9, 2011 in Ufa, Russia. However, she withdrew from the fight on October 30 due to complications in securing a visa.

Young faced Anna Barone at "Downtown Showdown 2" on January 6, 2012 in Minneapolis, Minnesota. Barone missed weight, but the fight proceeded and Young defeated Barone by TKO when the doctor stopped the fight after round two.

=== Invicta FC ===
Young faced Leslie Smith at Invicta FC 1: Coenen vs. Ruyssen on April 28, 2012. Their bout ended in a split draw and was named fight of the night.

Young faced Liz Carmouche at Invicta FC 2: Baszler vs. McMann on July 28, 2012. She was defeated by submission due to a rear-naked choke in the second round.

Young was next set to face Sarah Kaufman at Invicta FC 3: Penne vs. Sugiyama. However, Kaufman suffered an injury and Young instead faced Leslie Smith in a rematch. She was defeated by TKO in the second round.

Young was scheduled to face Amanda Nunes at Invicta FC 5: Penne vs. Waterson on April 5, 2013. However, Nunes sustained an arm injury and Young instead faced Lauren Taylor. Young lost the fight via unanimous decision.

In April 2016 it was announced by Invicta FC that Young would be joining their staff as a fight matchmaker, working alongside Julie Kedzie.

After over four years of absence from competition, Young fought Reina Miura at Rizin 12 on August 12, 2018. Yong won the fight via unanimous decision.

Young was scheduled to face Zarah Fairn Dos Santos on November 16, 2018 at Invicta FC 32: Spencer vs. Sorenson. However due to visa issues Dos Santos was replaced by Sarah Patterson and the fight proceeded at 150-pound catchweight affair to accommodate Patterson. At the weigh-ins, Patterson weighed in at 154.5 pounds, 3.5 pound over the catchweight fight limit of 150. She was fined 25 percent of her purse, which went to her opponent Young. Young won the fight via technical knockout in round one. In June 2019, Young defeated Faith McMah by TKO in the third round.

Young faced Pam Sorenson on August 9, 2019 at Invicta FC 36: Sorenson vs. Young for the vacant Invicta featherweight title. Young lost the fight in a five round unanimous decision.

=== Professional Fighters League ===
On February 25, 2021, news surfaced that Young had signed with Professional Fighters League and is expected to compete in the women's lightweight tournament of season 2021.

Young made her debut against Cindy Dandois at PFL 3 on May 6, 2021. She won the bout via unanimous decision.

Young faced Mariana Morais on June 25, 2021 at PFL 6. She lost the close bout via split decision.

Young was scheduled to face Marina Mokhnatkina on August 19, 2021 at PFL 8. Young was pulled from the bout a day before the event due to undisclosed reasons.

Young faced Julia Budd on October 27, 2021 at PFL 10. She lost the bout in decisive fashion via unanimous decision.

Young faced Kayla Harrison on July 1, 2022 at PFL 6. Young lost the bout, with the referee stoppage at the 2:35 mark of the first round.

On April 3, 2023, Young announced her retirement from MMA.

== Championships and accomplishments ==
=== Muay Thai ===
- 2007 TBA-SA Amateur 135lb North American Muay Thai Champion

=== Mixed martial arts ===
- HOOKnSHOOT
  - 2007 HOOKnSHOOT Women's Grand Prix Champion
- Invicta FC
  - Fight of the Night (one time) vs. Leslie Smith

== Mixed martial arts record ==
Professional record breakdown
26 matches	12 wins	13 losses
By knockout	8	4
By submission	0	3
By decision	4	6
Draws	1	

Res.	Record	Opponent	Method	Event	Date	Round	Time	Location	Notes
Loss	12–13–1	Kayla Harrison	TKO (punches)	PFL 6: 2022 Regular Season	July 1, 2022	1	2:35	Atlanta, Georgia, United States	
Loss	12–12–1	Julia Budd	Decision (unanimous)	PFL 10: 2021 Season PFL Championships	October 27, 2021	3	5:00	Hollywood, Florida, United States	
Loss	12–11–1	Mariana Morais	Decision (split)	PFL 6: 2021 Regular Season	June 25, 2021	3	5:00	Atlantic City, New Jersey, United States	
Win	12–10–1	Cindy Dandois	Decision (unanimous)	PFL 3: 2021 Regular Season	May 6, 2021	3	5:00	Atlantic City, New Jersey, United States	Lightweight debut.
Win	11–10–1	Latoya Walker	Decision (unanimous)	Invicta FC 41: Morandin vs. Ruiz	July 30, 2020	3	5:00	Kansas City, Kansas, United States	
Loss	10–10–1	Pam Sorenson	Decision (unanimous)	Invicta FC 36: Sorenson vs. Young	August 9, 2019	5	5:00	Kansas City, Kansas, United States	For the vacant Invicta FC Featherweight Championship.
Win	10–9–1	Faith McMah	TKO (punches)	Invicta FC 35: Bennett vs. Rodriguez II	June 7, 2019	3	3:52	Kansas City, Kansas, United States	
Win	9–9–1	Sarah Patterson	TKO (leg kick and punches)	Invicta FC 32: Spencer vs. Sorenson	November 16, 2018	1	1:25	Shawnee, Oklahoma, United States	Catchweight (150 lb) bout.
Win	8–9–1	Reina Miura	Decision (unanimous)	Rizin 12	August 12, 2018	3	5:00	Nagoya, Japan	
Loss	7–9–1	Raquel Pa'aluhi	Decision (unanimous)	Invicta FC 9: Honchak vs. Hashi	November 1, 2014	3	5:00	Davenport, Iowa, United States	Featherweight debut.
Loss	7–8–1	Lauren Murphy	Decision (unanimous)	Invicta FC 5: Penne vs. Waterson	April 5, 2013	3	5:00	Kansas City, Missouri, United States	
Loss	7–7–1	Leslie Smith	TKO (punches)	Invicta FC 3: Penne vs. Sugiyama	October 6, 2012	2	2:19	Kansas City, Kansas, United States	
Loss	7–6–1	Liz Carmouche	Submission (rear-naked choke)	Invicta FC 2: Baszler vs. McMann	July 28, 2012	2	3:34	Kansas City, Kansas, United States	
Draw	7–5–1	Leslie Smith	Draw (split)	Invicta FC 1: Coenen vs. Ruyssen	April 28, 2012	3	5:00	Kansas City, Kansas, United States	Fight of the Night.
Win	7–5	Anna Barone	TKO (doctor stoppage)	Driller Promotions / SEG - Downtown Showdown 2	January 6, 2012	2	5:00	Minneapolis, Minnesota, United States	Catchweight (140 lb) bout; Barone missed weight.
Win	6–5	Liz Carreiro	TKO (punches)	FCF 49: Fight Strong For The Cure	October 1, 2011	1	4:47	Shawnee, Oklahoma, United States	
Loss	5–5	Julie Kedzie	Decision (unanimous)	Jackson's MMA Series 4	April 9, 2011	5	5:00	Albuquerque, New Mexico, United States	For the Jackson's MMA Series Women's Bantamweight Championship.
Win	5–4	Julie Kedzie	Decision (split)	Ultimate Women Challenge	September 24, 2010	3	3:00	St. George, Utah, United States	
Loss	4–4	Jennifer Tate	Submission (armbar)	Freestyle Cage Fighting 39	January 30, 2010	2	2:35	Shawnee, Oklahoma, United States	FCF Women's Bantamweight Grand Prix Quarterfinal.
Loss	4–3	Shana Olsen	TKO (punches and elbows)	Ironman MMA	December 11, 2009	2	1:52	Welch, Minnesota, United States	Catchweight bout; Olsen missed weight.
Loss	4–2	Gina Carano	TKO (doctor stoppage)	EliteXC: Primetime	May 31, 2008	2	3:00	Newark, New Jersey, United States	
Loss	4–1	Sarah Schneider	Submission (armbar)	Tuff-N-Uff: Thompson vs. Troyer	February 1, 2008	2	0:35	Las Vegas, Nevada, United States	
Win	4–0	Patti Lee	TKO (knee to the body)	HOOKnSHOOT: BodogFight 2007 Women's Grand Prix	November 24, 2007	1	0:53	Evansville, Indiana, United States	Won the BodogFIGHT 2007 Women's Bantamweight Tournament.
Win	3–0	Miesha Tate	KO (head kick)	HOOKnSHOOT: BodogFight 2007 Women's Grand Prix	November 24, 2007	1	0:30	Evansville, Indiana, United States	BodogFIGHT 2007 Women's Bantamweight Tournament Semifinal.
Win	2–0	Suzy Smith	KO (knees)	HOOKnSHOOT: BodogFight 2007 Women's Grand Prix	November 24, 2007	1	0:22	Evansville, Indiana, United States	BodogFIGHT 2007 Women's Bantamweight Tournament Quarterfinal.
Win	1–0	Lindsey Frandrop	TKO (body kicks and punches)	Brutaal - Fight Night	October 4, 2007	2	0:26	Maplewood, Minnesota, United States	

== See also ==
- List of female mixed martial artists
