= Elaina Maxwell =

American Mixed Martial Artist

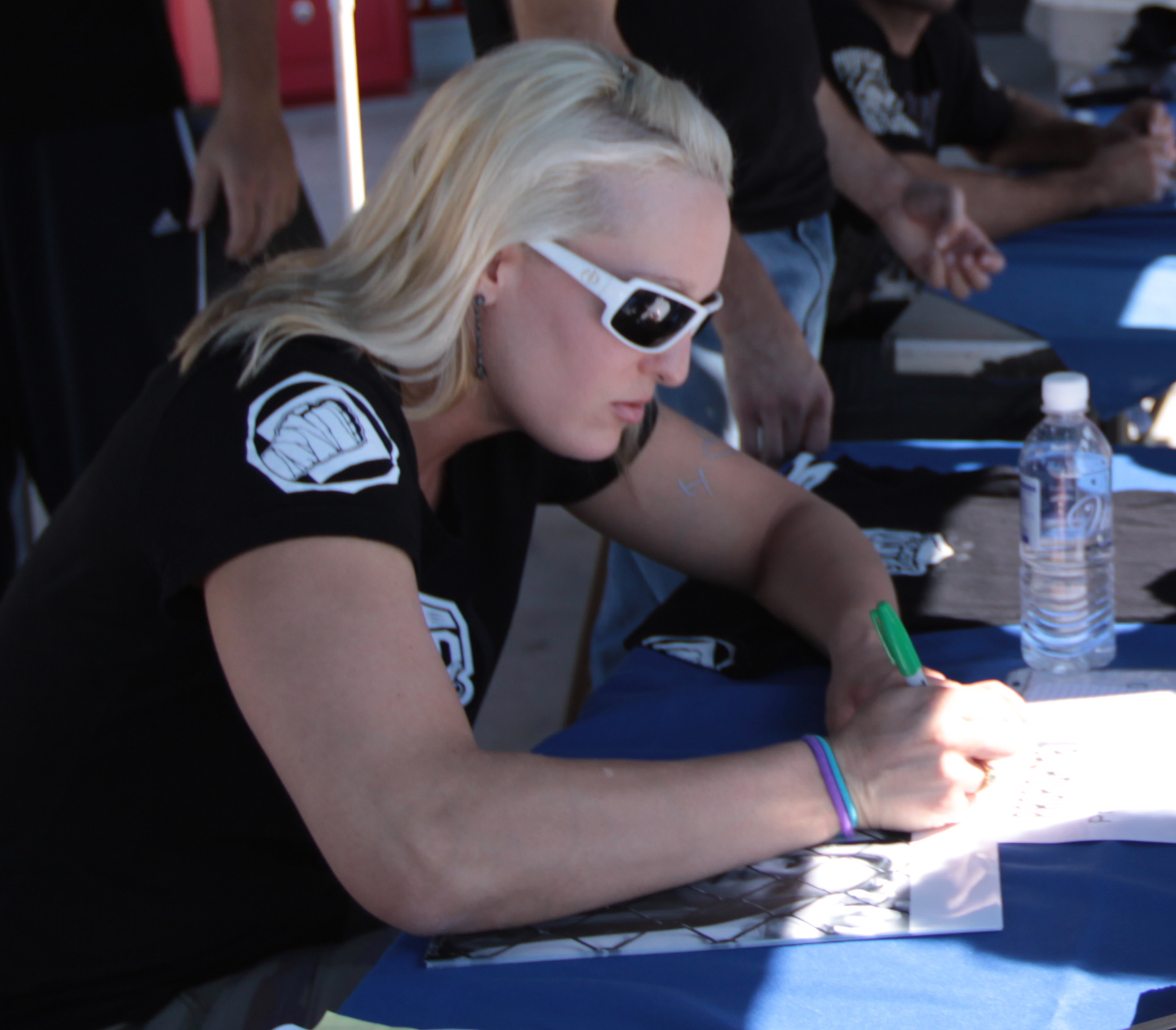
- Elaina Maxwell autograph session at Camp Pendleton
- Born: December 16, 1978 (age 47); Salt Lake City, Utah, United States
- Other names: Beef
- Height: 5 ft 8 in (1.73 m)
- Weight: 145 lb (66 kg; 10.4 st)
- Style: Sanshou, Brazilian Jiu-Jitsu, Wushu (sport)
- Fighting out of: San Francisco, United States
- Team: CSA Gym, Gracie Fighter; US Wushu Team (2003-2005)
- Rank: Purple Belt in Brazilian jiu-jitsu

Mixed martial arts record
- Total: 11
- Wins: 7
- By knockout: 3
- By decision: 4
- Losses: 4
- By submission: 1
- By decision: 3

Other information
- Website: http://www.elainamaxwell.com
- Mixed martial arts record from Sherdog

Medal record

Women's Sanda

Representing United States

World Wushu Championships
Gold medal – first place	2003 Macau	70 kg
Silver medal – second place	2005 Vietnam	70 kg

Elaina Maureen Maxwell (born December 16, 1978) is an American mixed martial arts (MMA) fighter, and professional kickboxer.

As a three-time San Shou Champion & BJJ purple belt, she trains under the guidance of Kirian Fitzgibbons and Cesar Gracie. After winning the first American gold medal at the World Wushu Championships in Macau, China in 2003, Elaina began to explore Brazilian jiu-jitsu.

With five titles and a San Shou record of 14-1 (2 KOs), she was booked to fight at the International Cage Fighting Organization - Warrior's Cup in Stockton, California on August 12, 2006.

== Early life ==
Maxwell has a fraternal twin sister named Ila. She started playing soccer in grade school and played volleyball in middle school.

=== IKF - International Kickboxing Federation ===
Elaina Maxwell won the IKF Amateur San Shou Rules Super Welterweight United States Title by forfeit when her opponent Melissa Alley pulled out of the bout after the event started on July 24, 2004, in San Jose, California.

First Defense: July 23, 2005, San Jose, California: Defended her title when she defeated Tiffany Chen of New York, NY with a round kick to Chen's face that split her chin open at 1:27 of round 1 stopping the bout.

== Mixed martial arts career ==
Maxwell was part of Strikeforce's first female mixed martial arts bout against Gina Carano on December 8, 2006. She lost the fight via Unanimous Decision.

She faced Michelle Maher in an MMA title match on July 24, 2007, at Melee on the Mountain. She won the fight via Split Decision and is currently the Golden State MMA Light Middleweight Champion.

Maxwell faced Miesha Tate at Strikeforce: Melendez vs. Thomson on June 27, 2008. She lost the fight via Unanimous Decision.

She was scheduled to face Alexis Davis at Raging Wolf 7: "Mayhem In The Mist 3" on May 8, 2010, but pulled out of the fight due to an injury.

Maxwell faced Lizbeth Carreiro at Freestyle Cage Fighting 44 on July 24, 2010. She won the fight via TKO in the first round.

Her next fight was against Alexis Davis at Raging Wolf 9 on August 28, 2010. This fight was originally for the Raging Wolf Women's Flyweight Championship but Maxwell was unable to make the 135 lbs weight limit, so the fight was changed to a non-title, three-round contest. Maxwell won the fight by unanimous decision.

On November 19, 2010, Maxwell faced Shayna Baszler at The Cage Inc. - Battle At The Border 7. Despite controlling the striking exchanges, Maxwell lost the fight by submission due to a kneebar in the first round.

Maxwell faced fellow Strikeforce veteran Shana Olsen at Crowbar MMA: Spring Brawl 2 on April 29, 2011, in Fargo, North Dakota. She won the fight by unanimous decision.

On July 23, 2011, Maxwell faced Angela Samaro at King of the Cage: Shockwave in Oroville, California. She defeated Samaro by TKO in the third round.

Maxwell faced Ashley Sanchez at Resurrection Fighting Alliance 2 on March 30, 2012, in Kearney, Nebraska. She won the fight by unanimous decision.

Maxwell was scheduled to face Julia Budd at Invicta Fighting Championships 3 on October 6, 2012, but she was forced to withdraw from the fight due to suffering a concussion in training.

== Media ==
Maxwell was featured on MSNBC's Warrior Nation as she prepared to face Gina Carano.

== Mixed martial arts record ==
Professional record breakdown
11 matches	7 wins	4 losses
By knockout	3	0
By submission	0	1
By decision	4	3

Res.	Record	Opponent	Method	Event	Date	Round	Time	Location	Notes
Win	7–4	Ashley Sanchez	Decision (unanimous)	RFA 2 - Yvel vs. Alexander	March 30, 2012	3	5:00	Kearney, Nebraska, United States	Catchweight bout; both fighters missed weight.
Win	6–4	Angela Samaro	TKO (elbows)	KOTC: Shockwave	July 23, 2011	3	1:00	Oroville, California, United States	
Win	5–4	Shana Olsen	Decision (unanimous)	Crowbar MMA - Spring Brawl 2	April 29, 2011	3	5:00	Fargo, North Dakota, United States	
Loss	4–4	Shayna Baszler	Submission (kneebar)	The Cage Inc. - Battle At The Border 7	November 19, 2010	1	4:03	Hankinson, North Dakota, United States	For TCI Women's 140 lbs Championship.
Win	4–3	Alexis Davis	Decision (unanimous)	RW 9: Mayhem In The Mist 4	August 28, 2010	3	5:00	Niagara Falls, New York, United States	Non-title fight (Maxwell missed weight).
Win	3–3	Lizbeth Carreiro	TKO (punches)	Freestyle Cage Fighting 44	July 24, 2010	1	2:55	Claremore, Oklahoma, United States	
Loss	2–3	Miesha Tate	Decision (unanimous)	Strikeforce: Melendez vs. Thomson	June 27, 2008	3	3:00	San Jose, California, United States	
Win	2–2	Michelle Maher	Decision (split)	MOTM - Melee on the Mountain	July 24, 2007	5	5:00	Friant, California, United States	Won Golden State MMA Light Middleweight Championship.
Loss	1–2	Michelle Maher	Decision (unanimous)	Strikeforce: Young Guns	February 10, 2007	3	3:00	San Jose, California, United States	
Loss	1–1	Gina Carano	Decision (unanimous)	Strikeforce: Triple Threat	December 8, 2006	3	2:00	San Jose, California, United States	
Win	1–0	Michelle Maher	KO (punches)	WC - Warriors Cup	August 12, 2006	1	1:05	Stockton, California, United States	

== See also ==
- List of female mixed martial artists
