= Julie Kedzie =

American mixed martial arts fighter

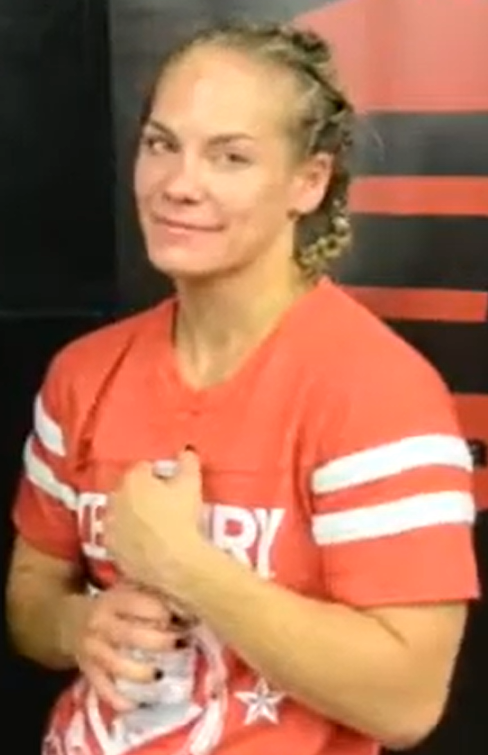
- In a 2018 interview
- Born: March 18, 1981 (age 45); Chicago, Illinois, U.S.
- Other names: Fireball
- Height: 5 ft 5 in (1.65 m)
- Weight: 135 lb (61 kg; 9.6 st)
- Reach: 64.5 in (164 cm)
- Style: Taekwondo, Muay Thai, Brazilian Jiu-Jitsu
- Fighting out of: Albuquerque, New Mexico
- Team: Jackson's Submission Fighting
- Rank: 3rd degree black belt in Taekwondo
- Years active: 2004–2013

Mixed martial arts record
- Total: 29
- Wins: 16
- By knockout: 3
- By submission: 3
- By decision: 10
- Losses: 13
- By submission: 7
- By decision: 6

Other information
- Mixed martial arts record from Sherdog

Julie Kedzie (born March 18, 1981) is an American retired mixed martial artist. She is a third degree black belt in Tae Kwon Do and specializes in Brazilian Jiu-Jitsu. Kedzie was Greg Jackson's personal assistant at Jackson's Mixed Martial Arts. Kedzie has been working for Invicta Fighting Championships as a fight commentator and interviewer. In December 2013, Kedzie became the new matchmaker for Invicta FC.

== Early life ==
Kedzie was born in Chicago, Illinois and moved to Bloomington, Indiana when she was twelve so her mother could pursue a doctorate in neurobiology from Indiana University Bloomington. Her sister is the geneticist Jennifer Raff.

She and her sister were enrolled in Tae Kwon Do by her father when Julie was five years old.

She studied under Steve and Linda Scott at Monroe County Martial Arts. She later returned to teach a one-time mixed martial arts class.

She has a Bachelor of Arts in English Literature from Indiana University Bloomington.

She graduated with a Masters of Fine Arts in Nonfiction Writing from the University of Iowa in 2019.

== Mixed martial arts career ==
=== Early career ===
Kedzie rose to prominence in mixed martial arts on November 19, 2005, when she won the one-night HOOKnSHOOT Women's Grand Prix in Evansville, Indiana.

=== EliteXC ===
On February 10, 2007, Kedzie faced undefeated rising star Gina Carano in a featured bout at EliteXC: Destiny, which aired live on Showtime. She was defeated by Carano, but the fight received Fight of the Night honours.

=== Independent promotions ===
Following the Elite XC fight, Kedzie defeated Kelly Kobold at BodogFight - Vancouver on August 24, 2007. She won the fight by unanimous decision.

Kedzie later signed a contract with the American Fight League, but the promotion folded and Kedzie was released from her contract.

=== Jackson's MMA Series ===
Kedzie was scheduled to face Sarah D'Alelio at Jackson's MMA Series 2 on September 4, 2010, but the fight was canceled after Kedzie signed on to take part in the filming of the Ultimate Women Challenge reality show. The show never made it to air, and 7 contestants sued the producers, claiming they were never paid.

During the filming of the Ultimate Women Challenge, Kedzie faced Kaitlin Young on September 24, 2010. She was defeated by split decision.

Kedzie's fight with Sarah D'Alelio was then rebooked for Jackson's MMA Series 3 on December 18, 2010, in Albuquerque, New Mexico. She defeated D'Alelio via unanimous decision.

She then faced Kaitlin Young in a five-round title rematch at Jackson's MMA Series 4 on April 9, 2011. Kedzie defeated Young by unanimous decision to become Jackson's MMA Series Women's Bantamweight Champion.

=== Strikeforce ===
Kedzie was scheduled to fight Amanda Nunes at the Strikeforce: Overeem vs. Werdum event on June 18, 2011, in Dallas, Texas. The bout, however, was cancelled after Nunes sustained a foot injury.

Kedzie made her Strikeforce debut against Alexis Davis on July 30, 2011, at Strikeforce: Fedor vs. Henderson in Hoffman Estates, Illinois. She lost the fight via unanimous decision.

Kedzie was expected to face Germaine de Randamie as part of the Strikeforce Challengers 19 card on September 23, 2011, but withdrew due to injury.

Kedzie faced Miesha Tate at Strikeforce: Rousey vs. Kaufman on August 18, 2012. She was defeated by submission due to an armbar in the third round.

=== Ultimate Fighting Championship ===
Kedzie's Ultimate Fighting Championship (UFC) debut was against Germaine de Randamie at UFC on Fox 8 on July 27, 2013. She lost the fight by split decision.

Kedzie faced Bethe Correia at UFC Fight Night: Hunt vs. Bigfoot on December 7, 2013. She lost the fight via split decision and subsequently announced her retirement from mixed martial arts competition via Twitter.

Kedzie announced that she is officially retired on April 24, 2021, via Twitter.

== Mixed martial arts record ==
Professional record breakdown
29 matches	16 wins	13 losses
By knockout	3	0
By submission	3	7
By decision	10	6

Res.	Record	Opponent	Method	Event	Date	Round	Time	Location	Notes
Loss	16–13	Bethe Correia	Decision (split)	UFC Fight Night: Hunt vs. Bigfoot	December 7, 2013	3	5:00	Brisbane, Queensland, Australia	
Loss	16–12	Germaine de Randamie	Decision (split)	UFC on Fox: Johnson vs. Moraga	July 27, 2013	3	5:00	Seattle, Washington, United States	
Loss	16–11	Miesha Tate	Submission (armbar)	Strikeforce: Rousey vs. Kaufman	August 18, 2012	3	3:28	San Diego, California, United States	
Loss	16–10	Alexis Davis	Decision (unanimous)	Strikeforce: Fedor vs. Henderson	July 30, 2011	3	5:00	Hoffman Estates, Illinois, United States	
Win	16–9	Kaitlin Young	Decision (unanimous)	Jackson's MMA Series 4	April 9, 2011	5	5:00	Albuquerque, New Mexico, United States	Won Jackson's MMA Series Women's Bantamweight Championship
Win	15–9	Sarah D'Alelio	Decision (unanimous)	Jackson's MMA Series 3	December 18, 2010	3	5:00	Albuquerque, New Mexico, United States	
Loss	14–9	Kaitlin Young	Decision (split)	Ultimate Women Challenge	September 24, 2010	3	3:00	St. George, Utah, United States	
Win	14–8	Malissa Sherwood	Decision (unanimous)	Jackson's MMA Series 1	June 5, 2010	3	5:00	Albuquerque, New Mexico, United States	
Win	13–8	Katrina Alendal	Decision (unanimous)	Cage Life: Ultimate Freedom Throwdown	July 4, 2009	3	5:00	Albuquerque, New Mexico, United States	
Loss	12–8	Sarah Schneider	Submission (rear-naked choke)	Duke City MMA Series 1	March 14, 2009	1	2:01	Albuquerque, New Mexico, United States	
Win	12–7	Angela Hayes	Submission (armbar)	Battlequest 8	April 11, 2008	1	4:26	Denver, Colorado, United States	
Loss	11–7	Tonya Evinger	Submission (rear-naked choke)	ShoXC: Elite Challenger Series	January 25, 2008	1	1:43	Atlantic City, New Jersey, United States	
Win	11–6	Jan Finney	TKO (punches)	HOOKnSHOOT: MW Tournament	September 29, 2007	2	2:44	Evansville, Indiana, United States	
Win	10–6	Kelly Kobold	Decision (unanimous)	BodogFight: Vancouver	August 24, 2007	3	5:00	Vancouver, British Columbia, Canada	
Win	9–6	Julia Berezikova	TKO (punches)	BodogFight: Clash of the Nations	April 14, 2007	2	2:49	St. Petersburg, Russia	
Loss	8–6	Gina Carano	Decision (unanimous)	EliteXC: Destiny	February 10, 2007	3	3:00	Southaven, Mississippi, United States	
Loss	8–5	Amanda Buckner	Submission (guillotine choke)	BodogFight: St. Petersburg	December 16, 2006	1	2:21	St. Petersburg, Russia	
Win	8–4	Molly Helsel	Decision (majority)	HOOKnSHOOT: The Women Return	November 18, 2006	3	5:00	Evansville, Indiana, United States	
Win	7–4	Jan Finney	Decision (unanimous)	KOTC: Meltdown	October 7, 2006	2	5:00	Indianapolis, Indiana, United States	
Loss	6–4	Tara LaRosa	Decision (unanimous)	Ultimate Cage Wars	July 8, 2006	3	5:00	Chelan, Washington, United States	
Win	6–3	Amanda Duvall	TKO (punches)	Cage Rage Indiana	May 6, 2006	1	0:18	Indiana, United States	
Win	5–3	Sasha Mrvic	Decision (unanimous)	Combat Do Fighting Challenge 7	April 22, 2006	3	5:00	Cicero, Illinois, United States	
Loss	4–3	Shayna Baszler	Submission (armbar)	Freestyle Combat Challenge 22	March 18, 2006	1	N/A	Racine, Wisconsin, United States	
Win	4–2	Molly Helsel	Decision (split)	HOOKnSHOOT: 2005 Women's Grand Prix	November 19, 2005	3	5:00	Evansville, Indiana, United States	Won 2005 HOOKnSHOOT Women's Grand Prix
Win	3–2	Jan Finney	Decision (unanimous)	HOOKnSHOOT: 2005 Women's Grand Prix	November 19, 2005	3	5:00	Evansville, Indiana, United States	
Win	2–2	Missy Karr	Submission (keylock)	HOOKnSHOOT: 2005 Women's Grand Prix	November 19, 2005	1	N/A	Evansville, Indiana, United States	
Loss	1–2	Jen Case	Submission (triangle choke)	HOOKnSHOOT: Arnold Classic	March 4, 2005	2	2:11	Columbus, Ohio, United States	
Loss	1–1	Jen Case	Submission (armbar)	HOOKnSHOOT: Evolution	November 6, 2004	1	2:51	Evansville, Indiana, United States	
Win	1–0	Terry Blair	Submission (armbar)	HOOKnSHOOT: Live	March 27, 2004	2	2:13	Evansville, Indiana, United States	

== HOOKnSHOOT - 2005 Women's Grand Prix Bracket ==
This tournament was held on November 19, 2005.

Quarterfinals
(United States)	Molly Helsel	SUB
(United States)	Kellyn Huehn	1
(United States)	Lisa Ellis	SUB
(United States)	Kellyn Huehn	1
(United States)	Jan Finney	KO
(United States)	Mystee Blackwood	1
(United States)	Missy Karr	1
(United States)	Julie Kedzie	SUB

Semifinals
(United States)	Molly Helsel	SUB
(United States)	Lisa Ellis	1
(United States)	Jan Finney	3
(United States)	Julie Kedzie	DEC

Finals
(United States)	Molly Helsel	3
(United States)	Julie Kedzie	DEC

== Accomplishments ==
- 2005 HOOKnSHOOT Women's Grand Prix Champion
- Extreme Grappling Open Champion
- Jackson's MMA Series Women's Bantamweight Champion (2011)
- BJPenn.com
  - 2012 WMMA Fight of the Year vs. Miesha Tate on August 18

== See also ==
- List of female mixed martial artists
