= HOOKnSHOOT =

MMA promoter based in Indiana

- Company type: Private
- Industry: Mixed martial arts promotion
- Founded: 1995
- Founders: Jeff Osborne
- Defunct: March 3, 2017
- Headquarters: Evansville, Indiana, United States

HOOKnSHOOT was a mixed martial arts (MMA) promotion based in Evansville, Indiana, United States. It was one of the earliest MMA promotions in the United States, and one of the first organisations in the United States to allow Women's MMA.

== History ==
HOOKnSHOOT was founded in 1995 by professional wrestling promoter Jeff Osborne. After watching the tapes of the early Ultimate Fighting Championships, he became interest in the nascent sport and sought to create his own event, forming HOOKnSHOOT at a gym in the small town of Boonville, Indiana. The name was chosen derived from Japanese shoot wrestling and the wrestling term "Shoot", to give emphasis to the "realness" of the event. Early events used different rules: shootfighting (similar to Pancrase) and "NHB" ("No Holds Barred", similar to the UFC), HOOKnSHOOT also became promoter of Shooto events in North America for a time, even adopting its rules.

HOOKnSHOOT saw the introduction and beginning of many future MMA stars, such as UFC Middleweight Champion Dave Menne, UFC Heavyweight Champion Frank Mir and Antônio Rogério Nogueira, Ian Freeman, Ivan Salaverry, Hermes Franca, Chris Lytle, Travis Lutter, Gesias Cavalcante and Jeremy Horn.

In 2002, HOOKnSHOOT put on an all women's card labeled ‘Revolution’. It was headlined by Debi Purcell and Christine Van Fleet. In 2005, they held an all-women, one-night-only tournament featuring Julie Kedzie, Jan Finney, and Lisa Ellis. According to Osborne, he was inspired to promote women's matches after seeing her daughter and wife watch with interest tapes of Megumi Yabushita and other female fighters at the ReMix tournament in Japan. HOOKnSHOOT is considered the pioneer in Women's MMA, and Jeff Osborne has been referred as "The Godfather of North American WMMA".

In 2017, Jeff Osborne announced the close of HOOKnSHOOT, citing the lack of interest for local shows and financial incentives, as well his own age. HOOKnSHOOT did its last event March 4, 2017, titled HOOKnSHOOT - The Farewell Show. Thus ending the run of the second longest-running MMA promotion in North America.

== Notable alumni ==
- Lisa Ellis (UFC)
- Jan Finney (Strikeforce)
- Megumi Fujii (Bellator)
- Julie Kedzie (UFC)
- Tara LaRosa (Invicta)
- Angela Magaña (UFC)
- Nicdali Rivera-Calanoc (Invicta)
- Miesha Tate (UFC)
- Kaitlin Young (Invicta)
- Yves Edwards (UFC)
- Jorge Masvidal (UFC)
