= Debi Purcell =

American martial artist

- Born: Deborah Ann Purcell; Huntington Beach, California, United States
- Other names: Whiplash
- Nationality: American
- Height: 5 ft 7 in (1.70 m)
- Weight: 135 lb (61 kg; 9.6 st)
- Fighting out of: Laguna Niguel, California
- Team: Ruas Vale Tudo
- Rank: Black Belt in Ruas Vale Tudo; Black Belt in Taekwondo; Black Belt in Brazilian Jiu-Jitsu

Mixed martial arts record
- Total: 6
- Wins: 4
- By knockout: 2
- By submission: 1
- Losses: 2

Other information
- Mixed martial arts record from Sherdog

Deborah Ann Purcell is a retired American female mixed martial artist. She was formerly an assistant coach to the Southern California Condors of the International Fight League.

== Early life ==
Purcell was involved in Cheerleading and Gymnastics throughout her early teens. She later quit gymnastics and took up Martial Arts. At the age of 17, she was introduced to Tae Kwon Do and this later introduced her to Boxing, Muay Thai, Vale Tudo, Wrestling, and Brazilian Jiu-Jitsu.

She is actively involved in supporting women's MMA, having set up Fightergirls.com and the WMAA (Women's Martial Arts Association), along with being a world-class competitor herself. Purcell also started Fightergirls, her own women's fitness and MMA apparel line, in which she designs every piece personally.

Purcell signed a three-fight deal with Elite XC. Her first fight was against Rosi Sexton at ShoXC: Suganuma vs. Hamman II on August 15, 2008. Purcell lost the fight by Split Decision.

== Personal life ==
Debi married Brazilian Jiu-Jitsu fighter Ronald Assumpcao on July 11, 2009, in Las Vegas, Nevada. She also gained a stepson named Gustavo.

== Accomplishments ==
- First woman to headline the world's first female MMA card HOOKnSHOOT
- First woman to ever compete and win in King of the Cage
- "Ultimate Wrestling" world Title Belt Holder
- Hook-N-Shoot Revolution Winner, 2002
- Headliner on the first ever all-women No Holds Barred (NHB) card in United States history
- "Ultimate Wrestling" Minnesota Winner and champion belt holder
- Black Belt in Ruas Vale Tudo (only female in the world)
- Black Belt in Taekwondo
- Only female coach in IFL history
- Current CEO of www.fightergirls.com the world's first female mixed martial arts website and store founded in May 2001
- One of the first pioneers for Women's MMA
- Built the first and original women's MMA website Fightergirls.com
- Original founder of all women's MMA clothing and gear

== Mixed martial arts record ==
Professional record breakdown
6 matches	4 wins	2 losses
By knockout	2	0
By submission	1	0
By decision	1	2

Res.	Record	Opponent	Method	Event	Date	Round	Time	Location	Notes
Loss	4–2	Rosi Sexton	Decision (Split)	ShoXC: Hamman vs. Suganuma 2	August 15, 2008	3	3:00	Friant, California	
Loss	4–1	Hitomi Akano	Decision (Unanimous)	Smackgirl - Advent of Goddess	February 15, 2006	2	5:00	Tokyo, Japan	
Win	4–0	Nicole Albrect	Decision (Unanimous)	KOTC 17 - Nuclear Explosion	October 19, 2002	2	5:00	San Jacinto, California	
Win	3–0	Amy Pitan	TKO (Punches)	UW - Ultimate Wrestling	June 29, 2002	1	1:41	Minneapolis, Minnesota	
Win	2–0	Christine Van Fleet	Submission (Rear-Naked Choke)	HOOKnSHOOT - Revolution	April 13, 2002	1	2:42	Evansville, Indiana	
Win	1–0	Amber Mosely	TKO (Punches)	UW - Street Fight Minnesota	September 30, 2001	1	1:16	Saint Paul, Minnesota	

== Outside MMA ==
Purcell appeared on the fourth season of VH1's Celebrity Fit Club as a guest trainer. She also appeared on an episode of The Montel Williams Show in September 2007.

Purcell has a HVAC license and owns and runs an air-conditioning business. She also owns a clothing design store called Purpur Hollywood Aprons, which specializes in vintage aprons.

== See also ==
- List of female mixed martial artists
