= Miesha Tate =

American mixed martial artist (born 1986)

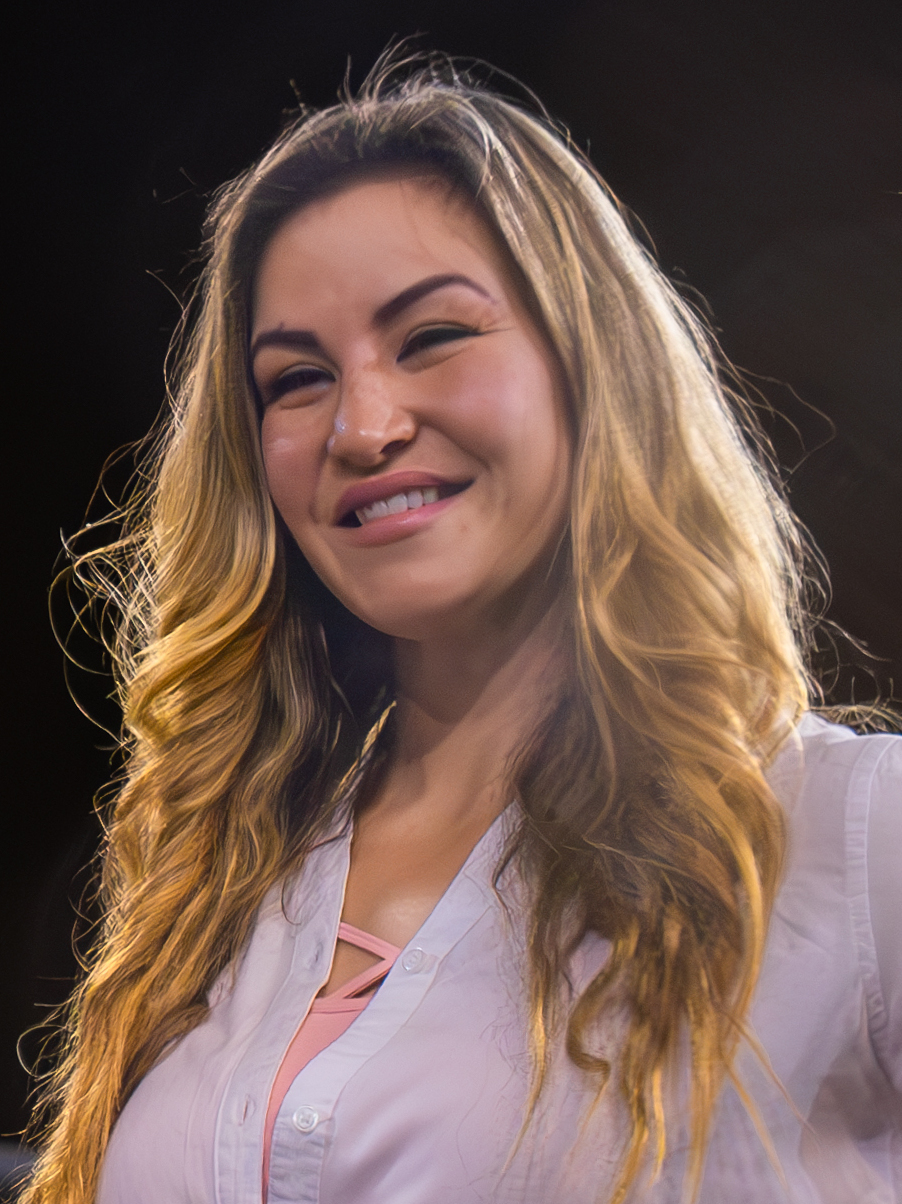
- Tate in 2024
- Born: Miesha Theresa Tate; August 18, 1986 (age 40); Tacoma, Washington, U.S.
- Other names: Cupcake
- Height: 5 ft 6 in (1.68 m)
- Weight: 136 lb (62 kg; 9.7 st)
- Division: Featherweight (2008); Bantamweight (2007–2016; 2021–present); Flyweight (2022)
- Reach: 65 in (165 cm)
- Style: Submission wrestling
- Fighting out of: Las Vegas, Nevada, U.S.
- Team: Xtreme Couture
- Rank: Purple belt in Brazilian Jiu-Jitsu
- Years active: 2007–2016, 2021–present (MMA)

Mixed martial arts record
- Total: 30
- Wins: 20
- By knockout: 4
- By submission: 8
- By decision: 8
- Losses: 10
- By knockout: 2
- By submission: 3
- By decision: 5

Other information
- Website: http://www.mieshatate.com/
- Mixed martial arts record from Sherdog

Miesha Theresa Tate (/ˈmiːʃə/ MEE-shə; born August 18, 1986) is an American professional mixed martial artist. She currently competes in the women's Bantamweight division of the Ultimate Fighting Championship (UFC), in which she is a former UFC Women's Bantamweight Champion. Tate formerly competed for Strikeforce, in which she is a former Strikeforce Women's Bantamweight Champion. She was also the vice president of ONE Championship.

== Early life ==
Tate was born in Tacoma, Washington, to Michelle Tate, and was raised by Michelle and husband Robert Schmidt. A tomboy during her youth, she often socialized with the boys in her neighborhood on playgrounds. While attending Franklin Pierce High School, Tate sought a sport to participate in, and eventually chose amateur wrestling over basketball. She wrestled on the boys' team from her freshman year until graduation. "I got my butt kicked pretty hard for the first few weeks. I had no idea what I was doing, like a fish out of water," Tate recalled in 2011. During her senior year in 2005, she competed in the girls' state championship and won the title.

While Tate was attending Central Washington University, a friend of hers encouraged her to attend the mixed martial arts (MMA) club with her. "I went there, and it really was a bunch of wrestlers. I fit right in," Tate said.

=== Amateur fights ===
Tate was initially wary of competing in MMA, explaining that she "didn't want to get punched." After seeing her training partners perform in actual competition, Tate was encouraged to accept her first amateur bout in March 2006, in which she was matched against Elizabeth Posener, a Muay Thai specialist. During the first round, Tate wrestled Posener to the mat, but did not strike while holding her there, which prompted Tate's trainers to remind her to. In the second round, Posener bloodied Tate with a knee from inside a clinch. While looking back on the fight in 2012, Tate noted, "I finally realized what I was there to do, and accepted the harsh truth—this wasn't a wrestling match...it was a fight". Tate escaped a submission attempt and responded by "whaling down punches" while Posener was on her back for the remainder of the round. Despite her eagerness to continue, Tate's corner ended the bout after the second round due to the injury she had sustained. Tate later commented, "When I get hurt or damaged, I fight that much harder." She amassed a 5–1 amateur record in MMA before turning pro.

== Mixed martial arts career ==
Tate made her professional debut in mixed martial arts in November 2007 at the one-night HOOKnSHOOT Women's Grand Prix. She defeated Jan Finney by decision, but was knocked out later in the night by a head-kick from eventual tournament champion Kaitlin Young. Throughout 2008 and 2009, Tate fought in several small organizations which did not regularly televise fights, defeating Jamie Lyn Welsh in CageSport MMA, Jessica Bednark in Freestyle Cage Fighting (FCF), and Dora Baptiste in Atlas Fights.

=== First MMA title ===
Tate captured the 135-pound FCF Women's Bantamweight Championship by defeating Liz Carreiro at Freestyle Cage Fighting 30 on April 4, 2009. After being knocked down in the first round, Tate gained control of the fight in the second and submitted Carreiro in the third. She defended the title once, defeating Valerie Coolbaugh by first-round armbar submission at FCF 38 in January 2010.

=== Strikeforce ===
On June 27, 2008, Tate debuted in Strikeforce, an MMA promotion based in San Jose, California, which televised bouts on Showtime and CBS. Fighting in the 135-pound bantamweight division, Tate defeated Elaina Maxwell by unanimous decision at Strikeforce: Melendez vs. Thomson.

After winning the FCF title in April 2009, she returned to Strikeforce at Strikeforce Challengers: Evangelista vs. Aina on May 15, 2009. Tate was originally scheduled to face Kim Couture, but Couture withdrew from the fight due to undisclosed reasons and Tate was matched up against Sarah Kaufman instead. In a competitive fight, Tate was defeated by unanimous decision, which marked the first time that Kaufman had gone to a decision.

After stepping away to defend her FCF title in January 2010, Tate faced Zoila Gurgel at Strikeforce Challengers: Johnson vs. Mahe on March 26, 2010. Tate won the fight by armbar submission in the second round.

==== Strikeforce Bantamweight Champion ====
Tate was then included in a one-night Strikeforce women's tournament on August 13, 2010, at Strikeforce Challengers: Riggs vs. Taylor. A random drawing was held on the day of the weigh-ins to determine first-round matchups and Tate faced Maiju Kujala in the opening round of the tournament. She defeated Kujala by unanimous decision after two rounds to advance to the tournament final. She then defeated Hitomi Akano by unanimous decision after three rounds to become Strikeforce Women's Bantamweight Tournament Champion.

Tate was scheduled to challenge Marloes Coenen for the Strikeforce Women's Bantamweight Championship on March 5, 2011, but withdrew from the fight after suffering a knee injury in training. The fight was rescheduled for Strikeforce: Fedor vs. Henderson on July 30, 2011. Going into the bout, Tate laughed while stating, "I'm going to try to kill her, I really am. I'm going to try to get to the point where the referee is fearful [for] her life and stops the fight. That's my goal." Coenen, known for her jiu-jitsu pedigree, had never been submitted in a mixed martial arts bout. In the fourth round, Tate defeated Coenen via submission (arm-triangle choke) to become the new champion.

Following the fight, Tate stated, "I think I'm not in reality quite yet. I can't believe that I have a belt to take home with me. I really had to dig deep those last couple rounds. Like I said, I had a tough end to my training camp, but I just feel like I went out there and I did what I needed to do and I won the fight and I'm world champion."

==== Final Strikeforce fights ====
Tate's first title defense was expected to be against former opponent Sarah Kaufman. However, Ronda Rousey, a new Strikeforce fighter, offered to fight Kaufman for the top-contender spot, seeking a title shot against Tate specifically. "I really want to have a title fight against Miesha Tate. I don't want to take a risk on her losing," Rousey said.

Rousey later explained that she believed a title fight between herself and Tate would garner significant attention. Strikeforce officials eventually announced that Rousey would be Tate's first challenger.

As Rousey predicted, her bout with Tate was highly publicized in the months preceding it. Rousey had made her MMA debut in early 2011 and defeated all four of her opponents by first-round armbar submission. However, Tate did not believe that Rousey had earned a title shot, and felt that Rousey was largely gaining the opportunity due to being "pretty". The two engaged in a variety of trash-talk, with Rousey stating that she was "bored" while watching Tate's win over Coenen. Ultimately, Tate and Rousey headlined a Strikeforce show on March 3, 2012. This marked a then-rare occurrence of women being placed in the main event of an MMA card. The bout was televised on Showtime and introduced by Jimmy Lennon, Jr. Shortly after the fight began, Tate escaped Rousey's first armbar attempt and retaliated with strikes. After a back-and-forth session of grappling, Tate lost the title when Rousey secured a second armbar near the end of the first round, forcing her to submit.

Tate was criticized by the media for risking long-term damage to her arm by resisting the armbar for several moments. Rousey later stated, "Miesha impressed me, she's a tough chick 'cause that hurts. I've had my elbow dislocated before and that's no fun. The rule in judo is even if it's dislocated if they don't tap, then keep going."

Tate then faced Julie Kedzie at Strikeforce: Rousey vs. Kaufman on August 18, 2012. In a striker-versus-grappler match-up, Tate endured two head-kicks and was knocked down twice. She subdued Kedzie with a fight-ending armbar in the third round.

=== Ultimate Fighting Championship ===
Following Strikeforce's fold, Tate officially joined the Ultimate Fighting Championship (UFC) in February 2013. Company president Dana White credited her fight with Ronda Rousey for bringing women's MMA to the promotion. The UFC announced that she would face Cat Zingano on April 13 at The Ultimate Fighter 17 Finale.

Regarding her long-term goals, Tate said, "Becoming a champion means more to me than anything—more than a rematch, more than anything. That's something that when I'm 80 years old someday and I have kids and grandkids I can look back and say, 'Look, this is what I did. This is my accomplishment.' So that's my ultimate goal."

Prior to the fight, it was revealed that the winner of Tate vs. Zingano would receive a title shot against Rousey, who became the inaugural UFC Women's Bantamweight Champion due to Strikeforce and the UFC being owned by the same company. It was also revealed that the winner would coach against Rousey on the 18th edition of The Ultimate Fighter, a UFC reality show.

Despite winning the first two rounds, Tate lost in the final round by TKO. Tate argued that the stoppage was premature. The back-and-forth action earned both women a Fight of the Night bonus. On May 28, it was announced that Zingano had withdrawn as Rousey's opponent and opposing coach after suffering a knee injury which required surgery, and had been replaced by Tate. This fight earned her a Fight of the Night award.

==== First title shot ====
Prior to their rematch, Rousey expressed respect for Tate's fighting ability, and declared her appreciation for their rivalry. Tate remarked, "We have our definite disagreements, but I give her credit for what she's done and where she's got in the sport of women's MMA. Without her, I don't think we'd be as far so I do value that."

The rematch took place at UFC 168 on December 28, 2013. The fight was largely one-sided, in Rousey's favor, though Tate did manage to take Rousey beyond the first round, coming back from several of Rousey's takedowns and even causing the crowd to rally behind her towards the end of round 2. After escaping two submission attempts, Tate lost to an armbar in the third round. This fight earned her a second Fight of the Night award.

==== First UFC victories ====
Tate faced Liz Carmouche in the co-main event at UFC on Fox: Werdum vs. Browne on April 19, 2014. She won the fight via unanimous decision, earning her first win in the UFC. Tate then faced promotion newcomer Rin Nakai at UFC Fight Night: Hunt vs. Nelson on September 20, 2014. She won the fight via unanimous decision, making Tate 2–2 in the UFC.

Tate faced Sara McMann at UFC 183 on January 31, 2015. Tate surprised many in the MMA community by out-grappling McMann, an Olympic medalist in wrestling, for the majority of round 3, winning the fight by majority decision (29–28, 29–27, and 28–28). Following Tate's third UFC victory, FoxSports.com declared that Tate had "proven to be the top fighter in the world at 135 pounds outside of the champion".

On March 20, 2015, it was announced that Tate would face Jessica Eye in a bout on July 25, 2015, at UFC on Fox: Dillashaw vs. Barão 2. Given the significance of the fight, which was initially promoted as a top-contender bout, Tate remarked that she expected "the best Jessica Eye that anyone has ever seen," and called Eye a tough opponent. Tate won the fight by unanimous decision.

==== UFC Champion ====
On November 14, 2015, Holly Holm defeated Rousey for the UFC Bantamweight Championship. In January 2016, the UFC announced that Tate would be the first title defense for Holm at UFC 196 on March 5, 2016. After a back-and-forth four rounds that saw both fighters displaying an advantage, Tate defeated Holm via a technical submission due to a rear-naked choke in the fifth round to become the new UFC Bantamweight Champion. The win also earned Tate her first Performance of the Night bonus award.

Following Tate's victory over Holm, UFC president Dana White quickly announced that Tate's first title defense would be against Ronda Rousey at a yet-to-be-determined event later in 2016. However, on April 6, White revealed that Tate would instead fight Amanda Nunes in her first title defense at UFC 200 on July 9, 2016. In this fight, Nunes battered Tate with several consecutive strikes and finished her with a rear-naked choke three minutes into the first round.

==== Retirement ====
Tate fought Raquel Pennington at UFC 205 on November 12, 2016. Prior to the event, Tate stated that she intended to take a hiatus from MMA after the bout. She also agreed to a grappling-only rematch with Jessica Eye at a Submission Underground show on December 11, 2016. After losing to Pennington via unanimous decision, Tate announced her retirement from mixed martial arts. "I love you all so much, I've been doing this for over a decade. Thank you so much for being here, I love this sport forever but it's not my time anymore," she said after the fight.

=== ONE Championship ===
On November 7, 2018, it was reported that Tate joined ONE Championship as a Vice President. She left the job in 2021 to return to MMA competition.

=== UFC return ===
On March 24, 2021, Tate announced she would be returning to compete in MMA against Marion Reneau on July 17, 2021, at UFC on ESPN: Makhachev vs. Moisés. She won the fight via third round TKO. This win earned her the second Performance of the Night award in her UFC career.

Tate was scheduled to face Ketlen Vieira on October 16, 2021, at UFC Fight Night 195. However, on September 22, the bout was pulled from the card when Tate tested positive for COVID-19. The bout was rebooked on November 20, 2021, at UFC Fight Night 198. She lost the bout via unanimous decision.

==== Move to Flyweight ====
Tate was scheduled to face Lauren Murphy in a flyweight bout on May 14, 2022, at UFC on ESPN 36. However, the bout was moved to UFC 276 for unknown reasons. In turn, a week before that event, Murphy pulled out after she tested positive for COVID-19. The bout was then rescheduled and eventually took place on July 16, 2022, at UFC on ABC 3. Tate lost the fight via unanimous decision.

==== Return to Bantamweight ====
Tate was scheduled to face Mayra Bueno Silva on June 3, 2023 at UFC on ESPN 46. However on May 10, it was announced that Tate suffered an undisclosed injury and that Bueno Silva would instead headline UFC on ESPN 49 against Holly Holm.

Tate faced Julia Avila on December 2, 2023, at UFC on ESPN 52. She won the fight via a rear-naked choke submission in round three. This fight earned her the Performance of the Night award.

Tate faced former Invicta FC Bantamweight Champion Yana Santos on May 3, 2025 at UFC on ESPN 67. She lost the fight by unanimous decision.

== Fighting style ==
Tate is known for her extensive knowledge of grappling arts, including wrestling, jiu-jitsu, and submission defense. Her wrestling-heavy style lead to her first nickname, "Takedown". In July 2011, Tate won the Strikeforce Bantamweight Championship by becoming the first woman to ever submit Marloes Coenen in an MMA bout. During her win at UFC 183, Tate out-grappled Olympic wrestling medalist Sara McMann. She is also noted for being the first fighter to escape Ronda Rousey's armbar on multiple occasions. Following their first bout in March 2012, Rousey described Tate as "much more savvy on the ground than I anticipated."

During the earlier phase of her career, Tate was generally noted for her double-leg takedowns, usually performed by picking an opponent up while pressing them against the cage. From top position, she typically attacked from side control as opposed to mount; in a rear position, she would usually secure a body triangle and attack with strikes. Having won multiple titles in wrestling, Tate was well known for her power on the ground, which often allowed her to hold opponents in vulnerable positions.

Tate has extensive training in Brazilian jiu-jitsu. When attacking from her guard, she usually attempted an armbar or a triangle choke. She employed a variety of submissions while grappling with opponents, including heel hooks, guillotines, and kimura locks. During her fight against Julie Kedzie, she also used a triangle to transition to mount.

Numerous media outlets, including Yahoo! and FoxSports.com, described her ground game as "powerful" and "dominant", noting that Tate's opponents were often overwhelmed if taken down. Julie Kedzie typically avoided going to the ground with Tate throughout the duration of their fight. During their bout at UFC 168, Ronda Rousey repeatedly blocked and reversed Tate's takedown attempts.

== Sponsorships ==
In 2014, Tate became the second MMA fighter (after Donald Cerrone) to join NASCAR driver Kevin Harvick's KHI Management company. Afterward, Tate gained sponsorship deals with NASCAR and Budweiser.

== Multi-media appearances ==
=== Film ===
Tate appears in the award-winning mixed martial arts documentary Fight Life. The film is directed by James Z. Feng and was released in 2013. The film's DVD bonus materials include a featurette on Tate and boyfriend Bryan Caraway.

In 2015, Tate was announced as a cast member of the feature film Fight Valley, which follows women competing in an underground fight club.

=== Magazines ===
In 2013, Tate posed nude for ESPN’s The Body Issue magazine. Tate appeared in the issue because she wanted to challenge views about women in combat sports:

One of the biggest common misperceptions about women’s mixed martial arts is that we’re not feminine. So for me it’s important to show that women in this sport are comfortable about their bodies, that we’re pretty and carry ourselves as women — and we can also turn it up a notch in the cage.

Tate appeared on the December 2013 cover of Fitness Gurls magazine, which labeled Tate "the most beautiful woman in MMA".

=== Video games ===
Tate is featured as a playable character in the video game EA Sports UFC.

=== Podcasts ===
As of September 2021, Tate co-hosts the show Throwing Down With Renee and Miesha on Sirius XM with Renee Paquette.

=== Television ===
In 2022, Tate was the winner of the third season of Celebrity Big Brother, in which she won four Head of Household competitions.

== Personal life ==
Tate is a fan of the Seattle Seahawks. Tate attended Central Washington University, where she met her ex-boyfriend Bryan Caraway. In 2014, Tate was credited by Caraway with saving the life of his mother, Chris Caraway, when she suffered an asthma attack while scuba diving, stopped breathing and became completely unresponsive.

On September 5, 2016, she helped carry a six-year-old girl with a broken arm while hiking in Nevada.

On January 1, 2018, Tate announced that she is in a relationship with fellow MMA fighter Johnny Nuñez. On June 4, 2018, she gave birth to their daughter, Amaia Nevaeh Nuñez. On June 14, 2020, she gave birth to their son, Daxton Wylder Nuñez.

Tate is a political conservative and has been a Trump supporter since before his first presidency.

== Championships and accomplishments ==
- International Sports Hall of Fame
  - Class of 2024

=== Mixed martial arts ===
- Ultimate Fighting Championship
  - UFC Women's Bantamweight Championship (One time)
  - Fight of the Night (Two times) vs. Cat Zingano and Ronda Rousey
  - Performance of the Night (Three times) vs. Holly Holm, Marion Reneau and Julia Avila
    - Second most Post-Fight bonuses in UFC Women's Bantamweight division history (5)
  - Most submission attempts in UFC Women's Bantamweight division history (12)
  - Tied (Raquel Pennington) for the fourth longest win streak in UFC Women's Bantamweight division history (5)
  - Third most control time in UFC Women's Bantamweight division history (1:01:50)
  - Third most top position time in UFC Women's Bantamweight division history (48:00)
  - Tied (Ketlen Vieira) for fourth most takedowns landed in UFC Women's Bantamweight division history (18)
  - UFC.com Awards
    - 2013: Ranked #9 Fight of the Year vs. Ronda Rousey
    - 2016: Ranked #2 Submission of the Year & Ranked #3 Upset of the Year vs. Holly Holm
- Strikeforce
  - Strikeforce Women's Bantamweight Championship
  - Strikeforce 2010 Women's Bantamweight Tournament Winner
- Freestyle Cage Fighting
  - FCF Women's Bantamweight Championship
- World MMA Awards
  - 2011 Female Fighter of the Year
  - 2016 Comeback of the Year vs. Holly Holm at UFC 196
- ESPN
  - 2016 Submission of the Year vs. Holly Holm at UFC 196
- Bloody Elbow
  - 2013 WMMA Fight of the Year vs. Ronda Rousey on December 28
- MMADNA.nl
  - 2016 Comeback of the Year vs. Holly Holm
- Bleacher Report
  - 2016 Submission of the Year vs. Holly Holm at UFC 196
- MMA Sucka
  - 2016 March Submission of the Month vs. Holly Holm at UFC 196
- CBS Sports
  - 2016 #3 Ranked UFC Fight of the Year vs. Holly Holm

=== Submission grappling ===
- 2009 World Team Trials Silver Medalist
- 2008 FILA Grappling World Championships Senior Women' No-Gi Silver Medalist
- 2008 World Team Trials National Grappling Champion

== Mixed martial arts record ==
Professional record breakdown
| 30 matches | 20 wins | 10 losses |
| By knockout | 4 | 2 |
| By submission | 8 | 3 |
| By decision | 8 | 5 |

| Res. | Record | Opponent | Method | Event | Date | Round | Time | Location | Notes |
|---|---|---|---|---|---|---|---|---|---|
| Loss | 20–10 | Yana Santos | Decision (unanimous) | UFC on ESPN: Sandhagen vs. Figueiredo | May 3, 2025 | 3 | 5:00 | Des Moines, Iowa, United States | |
| Win | 20–9 | Julia Avila | Submission (face crank) | UFC on ESPN: Dariush vs. Tsarukyan | December 2, 2023 | 3 | 1:15 | Austin, Texas, United States | Return to Bantamweight. Performance of the Night. |
| Loss | 19–9 | Lauren Murphy | Decision (unanimous) | UFC on ABC: Ortega vs. Rodríguez | July 16, 2022 | 3 | 5:00 | Elmont, New York, United States | Flyweight debut. |
| Loss | 19–8 | Ketlen Vieira | Decision (unanimous) | UFC Fight Night: Vieira vs. Tate | November 20, 2021 | 5 | 5:00 | Las Vegas, Nevada, United States | |
| Win | 19–7 | Marion Reneau | TKO (punches) | UFC on ESPN: Makhachev vs. Moisés | July 17, 2021 | 3 | 1:53 | Las Vegas, Nevada, United States | Performance of the Night. |
| Loss | 18–7 | Raquel Pennington | Decision (unanimous) | UFC 205 | November 12, 2016 | 3 | 5:00 | New York City, New York, United States | |
| Loss | 18–6 | Amanda Nunes | Submission (rear-naked choke) | UFC 200 | July 9, 2016 | 1 | 3:16 | Las Vegas, Nevada, United States | Lost the UFC Women's Bantamweight Championship. |
| Win | 18–5 | Holly Holm | Technical Submission (rear-naked choke) | UFC 196 | March 5, 2016 | 5 | 3:30 | Las Vegas, Nevada, United States | Won the UFC Women's Bantamweight Championship. Performance of the Night. |
| Win | 17–5 | Jessica Eye | Decision (unanimous) | UFC on Fox: Dillashaw vs. Barão 2 | July 25, 2015 | 3 | 5:00 | Chicago, Illinois, United States | |
| Win | 16–5 | Sara McMann | Decision (majority) | UFC 183 | January 31, 2015 | 3 | 5:00 | Las Vegas, Nevada, United States | |
| Win | 15–5 | Rin Nakai | Decision (unanimous) | UFC Fight Night: Hunt vs. Nelson | September 20, 2014 | 3 | 5:00 | Saitama, Japan | |
| Win | 14–5 | Liz Carmouche | Decision (unanimous) | UFC on Fox: Werdum vs. Browne | April 19, 2014 | 3 | 5:00 | Orlando, Florida, United States | |
| Loss | 13–5 | Ronda Rousey | Submission (armbar) | UFC 168 | December 28, 2013 | 3 | 0:58 | Las Vegas, Nevada, United States | For the UFC Women's Bantamweight Championship. Fight of the Night. |
| Loss | 13–4 | Cat Zingano | TKO (knees and elbow) | The Ultimate Fighter: Team Jones vs. Team Sonnen Finale | April 13, 2013 | 3 | 2:55 | Las Vegas, Nevada, United States | Fight of the Night. |
| Win | 13–3 | Julie Kedzie | Submission (armbar) | Strikeforce: Rousey vs. Kaufman | August 18, 2012 | 3 | 3:28 | San Diego, California, United States | |
| Loss | 12–3 | Ronda Rousey | Technical Submission (armbar) | Strikeforce: Tate vs. Rousey | March 3, 2012 | 1 | 4:27 | Columbus, Ohio, United States | Lost the Strikeforce Women's Bantamweight Championship. |
| Win | 12–2 | Marloes Coenen | Submission (arm-triangle choke) | Strikeforce: Fedor vs. Henderson | July 30, 2011 | 4 | 3:03 | Hoffman Estates, Illinois, United States | Won the Strikeforce Women's Bantamweight Championship. |
| Win | 11–2 | Hitomi Akano | Decision (unanimous) | Strikeforce Challengers: Riggs vs. Taylor | August 13, 2010 | 3 | 3:00 | Phoenix, Arizona, United States | Strikeforce Women's Bantamweight Tournament Final. |
| Win | 10–2 | Maiju Kujala | Decision (unanimous) | Strikeforce Challengers: Riggs vs. Taylor | August 13, 2010 | 2 | 3:00 | Phoenix, Arizona, United States | Strikeforce Women's Bantamweight Tournament Semifinal. |
| Win | 9–2 | Zoila Frausto Gurgel | Submission (armbar) | Strikeforce Challengers: Johnson vs. Mahe | March 26, 2010 | 2 | 4:09 | Fresno, California, United States | |
| Win | 8–2 | Valerie Coolbaugh | Submission (armbar) | Freestyle Cage Fighting 38 | January 16, 2010 | 1 | 4:45 | Tulsa, Oklahoma, United States | Defended the FCF Women's Bantamweight Championship. |
| Win | 7–2 | Sarah Oriza | KO (head kick) | CageSport 7 | October 3, 2009 | 2 | 0:08 | Tacoma, Washington, United States | |
| Loss | 6–2 | Sarah Kaufman | Decision (unanimous) | Strikeforce Challengers: Evangelista vs. Aina | May 15, 2009 | 3 | 3:00 | Fresno, California, United States | |
| Win | 6–1 | Lizbeth Carreiro | Submission (shoulder choke) | Freestyle Cage Fighting 30 | April 4, 2009 | 3 | 2:48 | Shawnee, Oklahoma, United States | Won the FCF Women's Bantamweight Championship. |
| Win | 5–1 | Dora Baptiste | Submission (triangle choke) | Atlas Fights: USA vs. Brazil | February 21, 2009 | 1 | 1:48 | Biloxi, Mississippi, United States | |
| Win | 4–1 | Jessica Bednark | TKO (punches) | Freestyle Cage Fighting 27 | January 31, 2009 | 1 | 1:22 | Shawnee, Oklahoma, United States | |
| Win | 3–1 | Jamie Lynn Welsh | TKO (punches) | CageSport 3 | November 29, 2008 | 1 | 2:21 | Tacoma, Washington, United States | Return to Bantamweight. |
| Win | 2–1 | Elaina Maxwell | Decision (unanimous) | Strikeforce: Melendez vs. Thomson | June 27, 2008 | 3 | 3:00 | San Jose, California, United States | Featherweight debut. |
| Loss | 1–1 | Kaitlin Young | KO (head kick) | HOOKnSHOOT: BodogFIGHT 2007 Women's Tournament | November 24, 2007 | 1 | 0:30 | Evansville, Indiana, United States | BodogFIGHT 2007 Women's Bantamweight Tournament Semifinal. |
| Win | 1–0 | Jan Finney | Decision (referee decision) | HOOKnSHOOT: BodogFIGHT 2007 Women's Tournament | November 24, 2007 | 4 | 3:00 | Evansville, Indiana, United States | Bantamweight debut. BodogFIGHT 2007 Women's Bantamweight Tournament Quarterfinal. |

== Pay-per-view bouts ==
| No. | Event | Fight | Date | Venue | City | PPV Buys |
|---|---|---|---|---|---|---|
| 1. | UFC 200 | Tate vs. Nunes | July 9, 2016 | T-Mobile Arena | Las Vegas, Nevada, United States | 1,009,000 |

== See also ==
- List of female mixed martial artists

Achievements
| Preceded by Marloes Coenen | 3rd Strikeforce Women's Bantamweight Champion; July 30, 2011 – March 3, 2012 | Succeeded by Ronda Rousey |
| Preceded by Holly Holm | 3rd UFC Women's Bantamweight Champion; March 5, 2016 – July 10, 2016 | Succeeded by Amanda Nunes |
Awards
| Preceded by Cris Cyborg | World MMA Female Fighter of the Year; 2011 | Succeeded by Ronda Rousey |
| Preceded by Eddie Alvarez | World MMA Comeback of the Year; 2016 vs. Holly Holm at UFC 196 | Succeeded by Justin Gaethje |
