= Gina Carano =

American actress and mixed martial artist (born 1982)

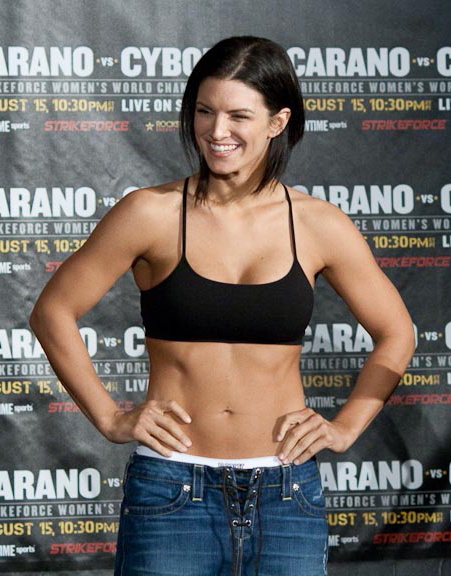
- Gina Carano at the weigh-in before the Strikeforce: Carano vs. Cyborg event
- Born: Gina Joy Carano; April 16, 1982 (age 44); Dallas County, Texas, U.S.
- Other names: Conviction; Crush
- Height: 5 ft 8 in (1.73 m)
- Weight: 143 lb (65 kg; 10.2 st)
- Division: Featherweight
- Reach: 66 1/2 in (169 cm)
- Fighting out of: Las Vegas, Nevada, U.S.
- Team: Jackson's MMA
- Trainer: Greg Jackson
- Years active: 2006–2009, 2026–present (MMA)

Mixed martial arts record
- Total: 9
- Wins: 7
- By knockout: 3
- By submission: 1
- By decision: 3
- Losses: 2
- By knockout: 1
- By submission: 1

Other information
- Notable relatives: Glenn Carano (father)
- Mixed martial arts record from Sherdog

Gina Joy Carano (born April 16, 1982) is an American actress and mixed martial artist. She competed in Elite Xtreme Combat and Strikeforce from 2006 to 2009, where she compiled a 7–1 record. Her popularity led to her being called the "face of women's MMA", although Carano rejected this title. She and Cris Cyborg were the first women to headline a major MMA event during their 2009 Strikeforce bout. Carano retired from competition after her first professional MMA defeat to Cyborg. She returned to compete in a bout against Ronda Rousey in 2026.

Transitioning from the ring to the screen, Carano landed her first major role as the lead of the action film Haywire (2011), which was followed by appearances in Fast & Furious 6 (2013) and Deadpool (2016). She also portrayed Cara Dune in the first two seasons of the Disney+ Star Wars series The Mandalorian from 2019 to 2020. After she was fired from the series in 2021, Carano filed a lawsuit against Disney in 2024 for wrongful termination, which Disney settled the following year.

== Early life ==
Carano was born in Dallas County, Texas, and raised in Las Vegas, Nevada, the daughter of Dana Joy Cason and casino executive and former professional football player Glenn Carano. She is the middle child of three sisters. She was raised by her mother after her parents divorced when Gina was seven.

Carano graduated from Trinity Christian High School in Las Vegas where she led the girls' basketball team to a state title. She also played volleyball and softball. She attended the University of Nevada, Reno for a year and then University of Nevada, Las Vegas for three years, majoring in psychology.

== Mixed martial arts career ==
Carano started her career in the sport of Muay Thai. Her boyfriend (now husband) Kevin Ross, a pro Muay Thai fighter, got her involved. After achieving a Muay Thai record of 12–1–1, Carano received an offer from Jamie Levine to participate in the first-ever sanctioned female MMA bout in Nevada with World Extreme Fighting to fight Leiticia Pestovа (a bout Carano won in 38 seconds). She was invited to the World Pro Fighting show in Las Vegas to fight Rosi Sexton. Carano won the fight by knocking out Sexton late in the second round.

Carano faced Elaina Maxwell at Strikeforce: Triple Threat on December 8, 2006. She won the fight via unanimous decision. Carano proved critics wrong when she defeated Maxwell for the second time; the first victory coming in a Muay Thai bout. It was the first female fight in Strikeforce. She fought on the February 10, 2007 Showtime EliteXC card, defeating Julie Kedzie via unanimous decision in what was called the "Fight of the Night". It was the first televised female fight on Showtime. Her scheduled bout against Jan Finney at the EliteXC/K-1 Dynamite!! USA event on June 2, 2007 was canceled due to illness. The Fight Network and other news outlets reported that Carano was rushed to the hospital by ambulance for dehydration while attending a World Extreme Cagefighting event as a spectator.

Carano fought on the September 15, 2007 Showtime EliteXC card, where she defeated Tonya Evinger via rear-naked choke for her first career win by submission. She impressed critics by holding her own on the ground before submitting Evinger late in the first round. Carano defeated former HOOKnSHOOT Champion Kaitlin Young at EliteXC: Primetime on May 31, 2008. A day before the fight, Carano failed to make weight for her fight after weighing in at 144.5 pounds (65.5 kg). Although most MMA organizations set weight classes at 135 lb (61 kg) (bantamweight) and 145 lb (66 kg) (featherweight), EliteXC opted to create a women's weight class at 140 pounds (64 kg). Carano agreed to forfeit 12.5% of her "show" purse to Young, and the fight remained on the card.

Leading up to her fight against Kelly Kobold, there was much controversy over whether Carano would make weight for the fight, as she had fought only once in the past year and had failed to make weight. Carano assured critics that she would be able to make weight since she had hired a nutritionist to help with her dieting. At the weigh-in for the Kobold fight on October 3, 2008, Carano weighed in at 142.75 pounds (64.75 kg) on her first attempt. After removing her clothing, a towel-covered Carano weighed in a second time at 142.5 pounds (64.6 kg). The towel was removed, and on her third attempt, Carano weighed 141 pounds (64 kg) and successfully made weight.

Early on, Kobold was intent on pressing Carano in the clinch, while working for the takedown throughout the fight. Kobold managed a takedown in the second round, but the round ended before she could take meaningful advantage of it. Carano worked her opportunities by hitting Kobold at every turn whenever the fighters separated while opening a huge gash on the inside of her opponent's eyebrow in the first round. At the end of the third round, Carano looked to finish the fight as she unloaded a head kick that landed flush on Kobold's chin, but Kobold remained on her feet and the bout came to a close. Carano won by unanimous decision (30–27, 30–27, and 29–28).

=== Strikeforce Women's Lightweight Championship bout ===
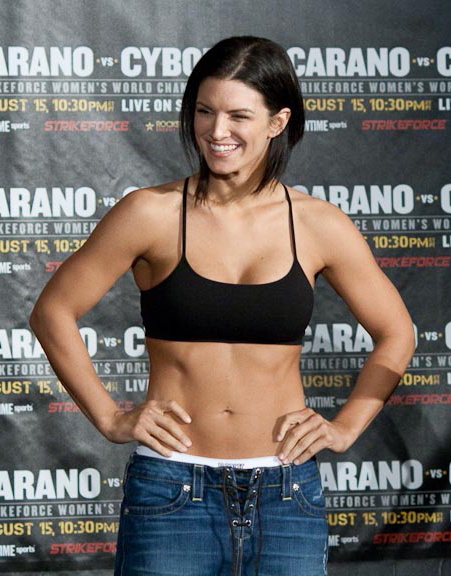
Carano before the weigh-in of her 2009 fight against Cris Cyborg

After Strikeforce purchased the assets of ProElite, Carano, along with other fighters within the defunct promotion, became contractually linked with Strikeforce after many months of a stalemate regarding their free agent status.

It was announced at Strikeforce: Lawler vs. Shields that Carano's fight against Cris Cyborg would take place on August 15, 2009, at Strikeforce: Carano vs. Cyborg. Strikeforce created their first Women's Championship for the bout. Though the 145-pound division is most commonly referred to as featherweight, Strikeforce CEO Scott Coker stated that the title would be known as the Strikeforce Women's Lightweight Championship. The title was later renamed the Strikeforce Women's Middleweight Championship. Carano lost the fight against Cyborg by TKO at 4:59 in the first round, giving her first-ever loss in her professional MMA career.

In November 2010, Strikeforce CEO Scott Coker stated he was hopeful that she would return in 2011. Carano's return was formally announced in February 2011, and Strikeforce announced at its April 9, 2011, event in San Diego that Carano would make her return against Sarah D'Alelio on June 18, during the Overeem vs. Werdum Strikeforce event in Dallas. This bout would have been held by Zuffa, who have been detractors of women's MMA in the past. Critics asserted that the reason for the turnaround was Carano's marketability. However, the fight did not take place. Initially, Strikeforce announced Carano failed her pre-fight medical examination and the fight was pulled from the card. Later, it became public that Carano was medically cleared by the Athletic Commission but was removed from the card for other reasons.

In April 2014, during an appearance on The Arsenio Hall Show Carano said she was considering a return to MMA. In September 2014, Dana White of the UFC said contract negotiations with Carano had stalled. During her appearance on the Joe Rogan Experience 690 podcast, Ronda Rousey said a fight between Gina Carano and her had been planned for December 2014, but never materialized.

From August 2009 to February 2026, Carano would remain inactive and was not scheduled for any upcoming events. She is still under contract with the UFC through her old Strikeforce contract and has four fights remaining on that contract.

=== Bout against Ronda Rousey ===
On February 17, 2026, it was announced that Carano would make a one-off return to MMA after a 17-year hiatus under Most Valuable Promotions at MVP MMA 1, against former UFC Women's Bantamweight Champion Ronda Rousey on May 16, 2026. Carano lost the fight via an armbar submission 17 seconds into the first round. After the bout, Carano hinted at a future in MMA following her return, wanting to continue exploring her newfound fitness and renewed passion for the sport.

== Television and film career ==
=== 2000s ===
Carano starred in the 2005 film Ring Girls. Based on true events, it is about five American women from Las Vegas who attempt to fight the best Muay Thai fighters in the world. Along with Lisa King, Carano served as a mentor to aspiring fighters in the 2007 Oxygen reality series Fight Girls. She appeared as "Crush" on the NBC show American Gladiators, in which she starred in the workout video of the show along with Monica Carlson (Jet), Jennifer Widerstrom (Phoenix), Michael O'Hearn (Titan), Tanoai Reed (Toa) and Don "Hollywood" Yates (Wolf). The DVD was released on December 16, 2008.

She appeared in Command & Conquer: Red Alert 3 as Natasha, portraying the Soviet sniper/commando in various cut scenes. She is featured in the 2009 martial arts film Blood and Bone.

=== 2010s ===
In September 2009, Carano landed the leading role in the spy thriller Haywire (2011), directed by Steven Soderbergh. Christy Lemire of the Associated Press stated: "[Carano's] dialogue delivery may seem a bit stiff—and she has acknowledged that Soderbergh made some tweaks to her voice in post-production—but she has tremendous presence: an intriguing mix of muscular power and eye-catching femininity." Newsweek said Carano's martial-arts experience gives her "an unparalleled physicality" in the role. She described her knockout fight with co-star Michael Fassbender:

We were brutal to each other. He was slamming me into the wall. He slammed my head so hard, I lost it for a second—I went white. And at one point, our knees clashed, [and] he got a limp.

In February 2012, Carano was cast in In the Blood (2014), an action thriller directed by John Stockwell.

In 2012, Carano was cast as the lead in an all-female ensemble action film, tentatively titled The ExpendaBelles, that would have been part of The Expendables film franchise. Producer Adi Shankar said, "I don't know how I'm supposed to make a movie that is supposed to be the female version of The Expendables without Gina Carano in it. It would be like making Twix without caramel or Jamba Juice without Jamba." The project has yet to materialize.

Carano appeared in Fast & Furious 6 (2013) as a member of Special Agent Luke Hobbs' (Dwayne Johnson) Diplomatic Security Service team. Several critics praised Carano's performance; Richard Roeper of the Chicago Sun-Times wrote, "Gina Carano is BIG fun to watch. [She] is still a bit stilted with her line readings, but her two fight scenes with Michelle Rodriguez are just epic." while Matt Goldberg of Collider.com wrote that the scene would "create a lot of new Gina Carano fans."

In July 2013, she and comic book creator Rob Liefeld announced they were working on a big-screen adaptation of Liefeld's Avengelyne in which Carano would star as the titular character. Carano appeared in the 2013–2014 Fox series Almost Human episode "Unbound", where she played the part of an XRN combat android named Danica. She co-starred in the 2015 film Extraction, and she played Angel Dust in the 2016 film Deadpool.

In 2018, she was cast in The Mandalorian, Lucasfilm's first live-action Star Wars television series. She portrayed the character Cara Dune with a first appearance in the fourth episode of the first season titled "Chapter 4: Sanctuary". Carano initially believed she would be playing the role of a female Wookiee, and was surprised to "find that [she] was one of the few people that you were actually going to see her face." She played the role in seasons 1 and 2.

=== 2020s ===
In February 2021, Carano shared an Instagram post that compared "hating someone for their political views" to the early stages of persecution of Jews by their fellow citizens before the Holocaust (Note: The Instagram post read: "Jews were beaten in the streets, not by Nazi soldiers but by their neighbors ... even by children. Because history is edited, most people today don't realize that to get to the point where Nazi soldiers could easily round up thousands of Jews, the government first made their own neighbors hate them simply for being Jews. How is that any different from hating someone for their political views?") and included an image taken during the Lviv pogroms. Many critics interpreted the post as comparing American conservatives to Jews in Nazi Germany. Shortly afterward, Lucasfilm stated that Carano was no longer employed by the company, saying that "her social media posts denigrating people based on their cultural and religious identities are abhorrent and unacceptable". A series of posts in which she mocked the use of face masks during the COVID-19 pandemic in the United States was also cited by Lucasfilm, as well as her repeated accusations of voter fraud during the 2020 presidential election. She was also dropped by the United Talent Agency.

A week later, Carano announced she would be developing, producing, and starring in a new film project with conservative news company The Daily Wire. The film, White Knuckle, was to be about revenge by a survivor of an attempted murder by a serial killer. The film was scheduled to begin production in October 2021 in Tennessee, Utah, and Montana. In the U.S., it was to be released exclusively to subscribers of The Daily Wire, and was to be released internationally by Voltage Pictures. In May 2021, Carano appeared as a guest on an episode of the show Running Wild with Bear Grylls. By fall 2021, the White Knuckle project had been cancelled at Carano's behest, due to her unwillingness to comply with Hollywood's COVID-19 mask and vaccine requirements. The group began production on the replacement film, a Western entitled Terror on the Prairie, that was released exclusively to Daily Wire subscribers in June 2022.

In November 2021, Carano was tapped to play a secret service agent in My Son Hunter, a biopic on Hunter Biden directed by Robert Davi.

In February 2022, Carano explained her online posts, saying that she "shared a meme, I translated into: Don't let the government pit you against each other or history tells us that could go wrong." Some fans and commentators contrasted Carano's firing with fellow The Mandalorian cast member Pedro Pascal suffering no consequence for making comparisons between the treatment of Jews in concentration camps and the treatment of undocumented migrant children at I.C.E. detention facilities in the United States. Carano was defended by The Mandalorian co-star Bill Burr, who described her as "an absolute sweetheart" and criticized her firing.

In February 2024, Carano filed a lawsuit against Lucasfilm over her firing, alleging wrongful dismissal and sex discrimination. The suit was funded by Elon Musk, who had previously promised to support anyone who suffered employment discrimination because of what they posted on X. Disney moved to have the case dismissed, which was denied by U.S. district judge Sherilyn Peace Garnett. Gina Carano v. The Walt Disney Company, Lucasfilm LTD. LLC, and Huckleberry Industries (U.S.) Inc. was set to begin on September 25, 2025, but in August, Carano and Disney settled their dispute.

== Accolades ==
Carano was profiled in a feature story for the ESPN series E:60. She was voted "Hottest Woman In America" by Big Biz Magazine in the Spring 2008 issue. On May 13, 2008, "Gina Carano" was the fastest-rising search on Google and third-most-searched person on Yahoo!, and ranked no. 5 on Yahoo!'s "Top Ten Influential Women of 2008" list.

In May 2009, Carano was ranked no. 16 on Maxim's Hot 100 list. She is one of the cover athletes along with Serena Williams for the October 19, 2009, edition of ESPN The Magazine's Body Issue.

Carano was a nominee for the 2013 Critics Choice Awards for best actress in an action movie for Haywire.

Carano was inducted into the Martial Arts History Museum Hall of Fame in 2015.

== Personal life ==
Carano stated in March 2026 that she had married her longtime boyfriend, Muay Thai fighter Kevin Ross, in August 2022, a marriage the couple had not previously disclosed.

== Awards ==
- 2008 World MMA Awards Female Fighter of the Year
- 2008 Sports Illustrated Female Fighter of the Year
- 2012 AOCA / Awakening Outstanding Contribution Award
- 2012 ActionFest Film Festival, Chick Norris Award for Best Female Action Star

== Mixed martial arts record ==
Professional record breakdown
9 matches	7 wins	2 losses
By knockout	3	1
By submission	1	1
By decision	3	0

Res.	Record	Opponent	Method	Event	Date	Round	Time	Location	Notes
Loss	7–2	Ronda Rousey	Submission (armbar)	MVP MMA: Rousey vs. Carano	May 16, 2026	1	0:17	Inglewood, California, United States	
Loss	7–1	Cris Cyborg	TKO (punches)	Strikeforce: Carano vs. Cyborg	August 15, 2009	1	4:59	San Jose, California, United States	For the inaugural Strikeforce Women's Featherweight Championship.
Win	7–0	Kelly Kobold	Decision (unanimous)	EliteXC: Heat	October 4, 2008	3	3:00	Sunrise, Florida, United States	
Win	6–0	Kaitlin Young	TKO (doctor stoppage)	EliteXC: Primetime	May 31, 2008	2	3:00	Newark, New Jersey, United States	
Win	5–0	Tonya Evinger	Submission (rear-naked choke)	EliteXC: Uprising	September 15, 2007	1	2:53	Honolulu, Hawaii, United States	Catchweight (141 lb) bout.
Win	4–0	Julie Kedzie	Decision (unanimous)	EliteXC: Destiny	February 10, 2007	3	3:00	Southaven, Mississippi, United States	Catchweight (141 lb) bout.
Win	3–0	Elaina Maxwell	Decision (unanimous)	Strikeforce: Triple Threat	December 8, 2006	3	2:00	San Jose, California, United States	Featherweight debut.
Win	2–0	Rosi Sexton	KO (punch)	World Pro FC 1	September 15, 2006	2	4:55	Las Vegas, Nevada, United States	Catchweight (138 lb) bout.
Win	1–0	Leiticia Pestova	KO (punches)	World Extreme Fighting: Orleans Arena	June 10, 2006	1	0:38	Las Vegas, Nevada, United States	Bantamweight debut.

== Filmography ==
=== Film ===
Year	Title	Role	Notes
2005	Ring Girls	Herself	Documentary
2009	Blood and Bone	Veretta Vendetta	Direct-to-video
2011	Haywire	Mallory Kane	
2013	Fast & Furious 6	Riley Hicks	
2014	In the Blood	Ava	Direct-to-video
2015	Heist	Officer Kris Bauhaus	Direct-to-video
2015	Extraction	Victoria	Direct-to-video
2016	Deadpool	Angel Dust	
2016	Kickboxer: Vengeance	Marcia	Direct-to-video
2018	Scorched Earth	Atticus Gage	Direct-to-video
2019	Madness in the Method	Carrie	
2019	Daughter of the Wolf	Clair Hamilton	
2022	Terror on the Prairie	Hattie McAllister	Also producer
2022	My Son Hunter	Agent Hound	

=== Television ===
Year	Title	Role	Notes
2007	Fight Girls	Herself	7 episodes
2008	American Gladiators	Crush	16 episodes
2014	Almost Human	Danica	Episode: "Unbound"
2019–2020	The Mandalorian	Carasynthia "Cara" Dune	7 episodes
2021	Running Wild with Bear Grylls	Herself	Episode: "Gina Carano"

=== Video games ===
Year	Title	Role	Notes
2008	Command & Conquer: Red Alert 3	Natasha Volkova	
2013	Fast & Furious: Showdown	Riley Hicks	Voice role

== See also ==
- List of Strikeforce alumni
- List of female mixed martial artists
- List of female kickboxers

== Notes ==
Awards
New award	World MMA Female Fighter of the Year; 2008	Succeeded by Cris Cyborg
