= Lisa Ellis (martial artist) =

American mixed martial artist

- Born: Lisa Ward; November 15, 1982 (age 43); Woodinville, Washington, U.S.
- Height: 5 ft 4 in (1.63 m)
- Weight: 110 lb (50 kg; 7.9 st)
- Style: Shootboxing, Grappling
- Fighting out of: Olympia, Washington
- Team: United Training Center

Mixed martial arts record
- Total: 26
- Wins: 15
- By submission: 11
- By decision: 4
- Losses: 11
- By knockout: 1
- By submission: 8
- By decision: 2

Other information
- Mixed martial arts record from Sherdog

Lisa Ellis (née Ward, born November 15, 1982) is an American professional mixed martial artist. She has fought in HOOKnSHOOT, Smackgirl, DEEP, Bellator Fighting Championships, Invicta FC, and the UFC.

== Mixed martial arts career ==
Ellis made her professional mixed martial arts debut on November 6, 2004, at HOOKnSHOOT - Evolution. She faced Mandy Stewart and was defeated by submission due to a triangle choke in the first round. Ellis entered the 2005 HOOKnSHOOT Women's Grand Prix on November 19, 2005, but was defeated by Molly Helsel in the second round. On November 15, 2006, Ellis faced Miku Matsumoto at Smackgirl - Women Hold Their Ground. She won the fight by submission due to a scarf hold armlock in the first round. Ellis made her Fatal Femmes Fighting debut at FFF 1 - Asian Invasion on February 17, 2007. She faced Masako Yoshida in the main event for the FFF Flyweight Championship. Ellis won the fight by Unanimous Decision after five rounds. She defended her FFF title against Taeko Nagamine at FFF 2 - Girls Night Out on July 14, 2007. Ellis won the fight by rear-naked choke submission in the first round.

Ellis faced Megumi Fujii at BodogFight - Vancouver on August 24, 2007. She was defeated by armbar submission in the first round. She returned to Fatal Femmes Fighting at FFF 3 - War of the Roses on November 3, 2007. Ellis moved up in weight to 135 pounds and faced Megumi Yabushita in a non-title fight. She defeated Yabushita by Unanimous Decision. Ellis entered the 2008 Smackgirl World ReMix Tournament on February 14, 2008. She faced Ayumi Saito and defeated Saito by submission due to a toe hold late in the first round.

She faced Ana Michelle Tavares in the second round of the ReMix Tournament on April 25, 2008. Ellis was defeated by Unanimous Decision. Ellis rematched Miku Matsumoto for the DEEP Women's Lightweight (106-Pound) Championship at DEEP - Toyama Impact on June 28, 2009. She was defeated by armbar submission in the third round. On May 24, 2010, Ellis announced that she had signed with Bellator Fighting Championships. She faced Stephanie Frausto at Bellator 22 and won the fight by technical submission due to a rear-naked choke in the first round.

Ellis signed on to be part of the Bellator Season Three 115-pound women's tournament and she faced Aisling Daly in the first round. The fight was originally scheduled for Bellator 25, but instead took place at Bellator 26 on August 26, 2010. Ellis won the fight via unanimous decision. Ellis once again faced Megumi Fujii in the second round of the Bellator tournament at Bellator 31. She was defeated by armbar submission in the first round.

Ellis was scheduled to face Ayaka Hamasaki in a non-title bout at Jewels 12th Ring on March 11, 2011, in Tokyo, Japan, but suffered a calf injury and was forced to withdraw from the fight. Ellis faced Jessica Aguilar in a rematch at Bellator 58 on November 19, 2011. She was defeated by unanimous decision. Ellis dropped down to 105 pounds to face Jessica Penne at Invicta Fighting Championships 1 on April 28, 2012. She lost the fight via TKO in the third round. On July 14, Ellis faced Amy Davis in a 110-pound title fight at United Combat Sports: Caged Combat 6. She defeated Davis by armbar submission in the first round.

=== The Ultimate Fighter ===
On July 3, 2014, it was announced that Ellis was one of the contestants on The Ultimate Fighter: Team Pettis vs. Team Melendez. Ellis was the fifth fighter to go to coach Gilbert Melendez. She faced Jessica Penne in the preliminary round and lost via submission in the first round. Ellis' first fight after The Ultimate Fighter was against Felice Herrig at The Ultimate Fighter: A Champion Will Be Crowned Finale on December 12, 2014. She lost the fight via submission in the second round. Ellis faced Bec Rawlings at UFC Fight Night 65 as a replacement for the injured Seo Hee Ham. She lost the fight via submission in the first round and was subsequently released from the promotion. Ellis entered the 2012 Shoot Boxing Girls S-Cup on August 25, 2012, in Tokyo, Japan. She was defeated by Seo Hee Ham via unanimous decision in the opening round of the tournament.

== Personal life ==
Ellis co-owns the United Training Center gym with fellow fighter Eddy Ellis. She married Eddy in July 2010. The Ellises' first daughter, Elenor, was born in 2013.

== Mixed martial arts record ==
Professional record breakdown
| 26 matches | 15 wins | 11 losses |
| By knockout | 0 | 1 |
| By submission | 11 | 8 |
| By decision | 4 | 2 |

| Res. | Record | Opponent | Method | Event | Date | Round | Time | Location | Notes |
|---|---|---|---|---|---|---|---|---|---|
| Loss | 15–11 | Virna Jandiroba | Submission (rear-naked choke) | F2N: Fight 2 Night | November 4, 2016 | 1 | 2:21 | Rio de Janeiro, Brazil | |
| Loss | 15–10 | Bec Rawlings | Submission (rear-naked choke) | UFC Fight Night: Miocic vs. Hunt | May 10, 2015 | 1 | 4:09 | Adelaide, Australia | |
| Loss | 15–9 | Felice Herrig | Submission (armbar) | The Ultimate Fighter: A Champion Will Be Crowned Finale | December 12, 2014 | 2 | 3:05 | Las Vegas, Nevada, United States | |
| Win | 15–8 | Amy Davis | Submission (armbar) | UCS - Caged Combat 6 | July 14, 2012 | 1 | 2:14 | Grand Ronde, Oregon, United States | Won the UCS 110 lbs Women's Championship |
| Loss | 14–8 | Jessica Penne | TKO (punches) | Invicta FC 1: Coenen vs. Ruyssen | April 28, 2012 | 3 | 2:48 | Kansas City, Kansas, United States | |
| Loss | 14–7 | Jessica Aguilar | Decision (unanimous) | Bellator 58 | November 19, 2011 | 3 | 5:00 | Hollywood, Florida, United States | |
| Loss | 14–6 | Megumi Fujii | Submission (armbar) | Bellator 31 | September 30, 2010 | 1 | 1:39 | Lake Charles, Louisiana, United States | |
| Win | 14–5 | Aisling Daly | Decision (unanimous) | Bellator 26 | August 26, 2010 | 3 | 5:00 | Kansas City, Missouri, United States | |
| Win | 13–5 | Stephanie Frausto | Technical Submission (rear-naked choke) | Bellator 22 | June 17, 2010 | 1 | 2:01 | Kansas City, Missouri, United States | |
| Loss | 12–5 | Miku Matsumoto | Submission (armbar) | Deep: Toyama Impact | June 28, 2009 | 3 | 2:53 | Toyama, Japan | For Deep Women's Lightweight Championship |
| Win | 12–4 | Patti Lee | Submission (reverse ankle lock) | Brawl At The Beach | July 18, 2008 | 2 | 2:44 | Jacksonville, North Carolina, United States | |
| Loss | 11–4 | Ana Michelle Tavares | Decision (unanimous) | Smackgirl - World ReMix 2008 Second Round | April 25, 2008 | 2 | 5:00 | Tokyo, Japan | |
| Win | 11–3 | Ayumi Saito | Submission (toe hold) | Smackgirl - World ReMix 2008 Opening Round | February 14, 2008 | 1 | 4:41 | Tokyo, Japan | |
| Win | 10–3 | Megumi Yabushita | Decision (unanimous) | FFF 3 - War of the Roses | November 3, 2007 | 3 | 3:00 | Ontario, California, United States | Non-Title Fight |
| Loss | 9–3 | Megumi Fujii | Submission (armbar) | BodogFight - Vancouver | August 24, 2007 | 1 | 4:50 | Vancouver, British Columbia, Canada | |
| Win | 9–2 | Elisha Helsper | Technical Submission (rear-naked choke) | Coeur d'Alene Casino - Fight Night | July 28, 2007 | 1 | 3:59 | Worley, Idaho, United States | |
| Win | 8–2 | Taeko Nagamine | Submission (rear-naked choke) | FFF 2 - Girls Night Out | July 14, 2007 | 1 | 2:37 | Compton, California, United States | Defended the FFF Flyweight Championship |
| Win | 7–2 | Masako Yoshida | Decision (unanimous) | FFF 1 - Asian Invasion | February 17, 2007 | 5 | 2:00 | Los Angeles, California, United States | Won the FFF Flyweight Championship |
| Win | 6–2 | Misaki Takimoto | Submission (kimura) | Smackgirl - Legend of Extreme Women | November 29, 2006 | 2 | 3:32 | Tokyo, Japan | |
| Win | 5–2 | Miku Matsumoto | Submission (scarf hold armlock) | Smackgirl - Women Hold Their Ground | September 15, 2006 | 1 | 3:04 | Tokyo, Japan | |
| Win | 4–2 | Leticia Pestova | Submission (armbar) | Valor Fighting - 4th and B | August 19, 2006 | 1 | N/A | San Diego, California, United States | |
| Win | 3–2 | Jessica Aguilar | Submission (rear-naked choke) | Absolute Fighting Championships 15 | February 18, 2006 | 2 | 2:53 | Fort Lauderdale, Florida, United States | |
| Loss | 2–2 | Molly Helsel | Submission (triangle choke) | HOOKnSHOOT - 2005 Women's Grand Prix | November 19, 2005 | 1 | N/A | Evansville, Indiana, United States | |
| Win | 2–1 | Kellyn Huehn | Submission (guillotine choke) | HOOKnSHOOT - 2005 Women's Grand Prix | November 19, 2005 | 1 | N/A | Evansville, Indiana, United States | |
| Win | 1–1 | Roseanne Blackburn | Decision (unanimous) | National Fighting Challenge 2 | February 18, 2005 | 3 | 3:00 | Vancouver, British Columbia, Canada | |
| Loss | 0–1 | Mandy Stewart | Submission (triangle choke) | HOOKnSHOOT - Evolution | November 6, 2004 | 1 | 0:49 | Evansville, Indiana, United States | |

=== Mixed martial arts exhibition record ===
| Exhibition record breakdown | | |
| 1 match | 0 wins | 1 loss |
| By submission | 0 | 1 |

| Res. | Record | Opponent | Method | Event | Date | Round | Time | Location | Notes |
|---|---|---|---|---|---|---|---|---|---|
| Loss | 0-1 | Jessica Penne | Submission (rear-naked choke) | The Ultimate Fighter: A Champion Will Be Crowned | September 24, 2014 (airdate) | 1 | 3:46 | Las Vegas, Nevada, United States | TUF 20 Elimination round |

== Shoot boxing record ==
Shoot boxing record
| Result | Record | Opponent | Method | Event | Date | Round | Time | Location | Notes |
|---|---|---|---|---|---|---|---|---|---|
| Loss | 0–1 | (South Korea) Seo Hee Ham | Decision (unanimous) | 2012 Shoot Boxing Girls S-Cup | August 25, 2012 | 3 | 2:00 | Shibuya, Tokyo, Japan | 2012 Girls S-Cup quarterfinal |

Legend: Win Loss Draw/No contest

== Championships ==
- Fatal Femmes Fighting Flyweight Champion 2007
- World Grappling Championships Gold Medallist 2007

== See also ==
- List of female mixed martial artists
