= Jan Finney =

American mixed martial arts fighter

- Born: April 18, 1980 (age 46); Springfield, Ohio, U.S.
- Other names: Cuddles
- Height: 5 ft 7 in (170 cm)
- Weight: 149 lb (68 kg; 10 st 9 lb)
- Reach: 67 in (170 cm)
- Fighting out of: Springfield, Ohio, U.S.
- Trainer: Scott Sheeley, Jon Stutzman, Oscar Kallet

Mixed martial arts record
- Total: 25
- Wins: 11
- By knockout: 6
- By submission: 1
- By decision: 4
- Losses: 14
- By knockout: 4
- By submission: 2
- By decision: 8

Other information
- Mixed martial arts record from Sherdog

Jan Finney (born April 18, 1980) is an American retired mixed martial artist. She competed professionally from 2004 to 2019, fighting in the Featherweight and Bantamweight divisions. She is most famous for competing in Strikeforce, where she was a Women's Featherweight title challenger. She has also competed in KOTC, EliteXC, HOOKnSHOOT, where she competed in the 2005 Women's Grand Prix, and BodogFight.

== Early life ==
Finney played softball at Kenton Ridge High School and Urbana University.

== Mixed martial arts career ==
Finney made her professional MMA debut on November 6, 2004, at HOOKnSHOOT: Evolution and defeated Rikki Burnett by Unanimous Decision.

She entered the 2005 HOOKnSHOOT Women's Grand Prix on November 19, 2005, but was defeated by Julie Kedzie in the second round of the tournament. She faced Kedzie again in a rematch on October 7, 2006, at KOTC: Meltdown, but was once again defeated by Unanimous Decision.

Finney faced Keiko Tamai at BodogFight – Costa Rica on February 16, 2007. She lost the fight via armbar submission in the second round.

Finney was scheduled to face Gina Carano at Elite XC/K-1 HERO's Dynamite !! USA on June 2, 2007, but the fight was cancelled after Carano was forced to withdraw due to illness.

Finney made her ShoXC debut on July 27, 2007, against Shayna Baszler. She was defeated by armbar submission in the first round.

She faced Kedzie for a third time on September 29, 2007, in HOOKnSHOOT, but lost the fight by technical knockout in the second round.

Finney is managed by Wade Hampel of Big Fight Management.

Finney entered the one-night 2007 HOOKnSHOOT Women's Grand Prix on November 24, 2007. She faced Miesha Tate in the opening round. After three rounds, the fight was ruled a Draw and went to an overtime round. Following the overtime round, the fight was again ruled a Draw and the referee awarded the victory to Tate.

Finney moved up in weight to face Erin Toughill at PFC 11: All In on November 20, 2008. Finney was defeated by Unanimous Decision.

Finney entered the Freestyle Cage Fighting Women's Bantamweight Grand Prix at FCF 39 on January 30, 2010. She defeated Lizbeth Carreiro by Unanimous Decision.

On March 27, 2010, Finney defeated Adrienna Jenkins by Unanimous Decision at FCF 40 to advance to the finals of the FCF tournament. However, FCF later agreed to release Finney from her contract in order for Finney to sign with Strikeforce and she was replaced in the FCF tournament final by Jenkins.

Finney made her Strikeforce debut on June 26, 2010, at Strikeforce: Fedor vs. Werdum. She faced current Women's Middleweight Champion (145 lbs) Cristiane "Cyborg" Santos and lost the fight via KO in the second round.

Finney then faced Liz Carmouche at Strikeforce Challengers: Wilcox vs. Ribeiro on November 19, 2010. She lost the fight via TKO in the third round.

Finney faced world champion boxer Holly Holm in a mixed martial arts bout at Fresquez Productions: Clash in the Cage on September 9, 2011. She was defeated by TKO in the third round.

Finney was scheduled to face Kaitlin Young in the main event of Freestyle Cage Fighting 49 on October 1, 2011, but withdrew from the fight and was replaced by Liz Carreiro.

== Mixed martial arts record ==
Professional record breakdown
25 matches	11 wins	14 losses
By knockout	6	4
By submission	1	2
By decision	4	8

Res.	Record	Opponent	Method	Event	Date	Round	Time	Location	Notes
Loss	11–14	Vanessa Melo	Decision (unanimous)	Battlefield FC 2	July 27, 2019	3	5:00	Macau, SAR, China	
Loss	11–13	Pam Sorenson	Decision (split)	IT Fight Series 77	November 22, 2017	3	5:00	Bellefontaine, Ohio, United States	
Win	11–12	Janice Meyer	TKO (punches)	IT Fight Series 48	December 10, 2016	2	2:06	Columbus, Ohio, United States	
Win	10–12	Al-Lanna Jones	TKO (punches)	STFC 40	November 5, 2016	2	1:07	McAllen, Texas, United States	
Win	9–12	Al-Lanna Jones	Decision (unanimous)	IT Fight Series 38	November 21, 2015	3	5:00	Dayton, Ohio, United States	
Loss	8–12	Marciea Allen	Decision (unanimous)	IT Fight Series 35	September 5, 2015	3	5:00	Springfield, Ohio, United States	
Loss	8–11	Valentina Shevchenko	Decision (unanimous)	Legacy FC 39	February 27, 2015	3	5:00	Houston, Texas, United States	
Loss	8–10	Holly Holm	TKO (body kick)	Fresquez Productions: Clash in the Cage	September 9, 2011	3	2:49	Albuquerque, New Mexico, United States	
Loss	8–9	Liz Carmouche	TKO (punches)	Strikeforce Challengers: Wilcox vs. Ribeiro	November 19, 2010	3	1:30	Jackson, Mississippi, United States	
Loss	8–8	Cris Cyborg	TKO (knee to the body)	Strikeforce: Fedor vs. Werdum	June 26, 2010	2	2:56	San Jose, California, United States	For Strikeforce Women's Featherweight Championship; Sherdog 2010 Beatdown of the Year
Win	8–7	Adrienna Jenkins	Decision (split)	Freestyle Cage Fighting 40	March 27, 2010	3	5:00	Shawnee, Oklahoma, United States	
Win	7–7	Lizbeth Carreiro	Decision (unanimous)	Freestyle Cage Fighting 39	January 30, 2010	3	5:00	Shawnee, Oklahoma, United States	
Win	6–7	Brighton Hutton	KO (punches)	C3: Slammin Jammin Weekend 2	October 30, 2009	2	1:31	Red Rock, Oklahoma, United States	
Win	5–7	Marissa Caldwell	TKO (punches)	MMA Big Show: Full Force	October 24, 2009	1	N/A	Florence, Indiana, United States	
Loss	4–7	Erin Toughill	Decision (unanimous)	PPFC 11: All In	November 20, 2008	3	3:00	Lemoore, California, United States	
Win	4–6	Suzy Smith	KO (punch)	Brawl at the Beach	July 18, 2008	2	1:33	Jacksonville, North Carolina, United States	
Loss	3–6	Miesha Tate	Decision (referee decision)	HOOKnSHOOT: BodogFight Women's Tournament	November 24, 2007	4	3:00	Evansville, Indiana, United States	
Loss	3–5	Julie Kedzie	TKO (punches)	HOOKnSHOOT: MW Tournament	September 27, 2007	2	2:44	Evansville, Indiana, United States	
Loss	3–4	Shayna Baszler	Submission (armbar)	ShoXC: Elite Challenger Series	July 27, 2007	1	2:40	Santa Ynez, California, United States	
Loss	3–3	Keiko Tamai	Submission (armbar)	BodogFight: Costa Rica Combat	February 16, 2007	2	3:01	Costa Rica	
Win	3–2	Ginele Marquez	Submission (armbar)	HOOKnSHOOT: The Women Return	November 18, 2006	1	3:38	Evansville, Indiana, United States	
Loss	2–2	Julie Kedzie	Decision (unanimous)	KOTC: Meltdown	October 7, 2006	2	5:00	Indianapolis, Indiana, United States	
Loss	2–1	Julie Kedzie	Decision (unanimous)	HOOKnSHOOT: 2005 Women's Grand Prix	November 19, 2005	3	5:00	Evansville, Indiana, United States	
Win	2–0	Mystee Blackwood	KO (punch)	HOOKnSHOOT: 2005 Women's Grand Prix	November 19, 2005	1	0:38	Evansville, Indiana, United States	
Win	1–0	Rikki Burnett	Decision (unanimous)	HOOKnSHOOT: Evolution	November 6, 2004	2	5:00	Evansville, Indiana, United States	

== See also ==
- List of female mixed martial artists
