= Alexis Davis =

Alexis Davis may refer to:

- Alexis Davis (General Hospital), fictional soap opera character
- Alexis Davis (fighter) (born 1984), Canadian mixed martial arts (MMA) fighter
