= McDowell High School =

McDowell High School may refer to:

- McDowell High School (North Carolina)
- McDowell High School (Pennsylvania)
