= Adrienna Jenkins =

American mixed martial arts fighter (born 1984)

- Born: September 20, 1995 (age 31)
- Other names: AJ
- Height: 5 ft 1 in (155 cm)
- Weight: 121 lb (55 kg; 8 st 9 lb)
- Division: Lightweight
- Fighting out of: Oceanside, California, United States
- Team: Miletich Martial Arts
- Years active: 2004–present

Mixed martial arts record
- Total: 25
- Wins: 19
- By knockout: 8
- By submission: 10
- By disqualification: 1
- Losses: 6
- By knockout: 2
- By submission: 3
- By decision: 1

Other information
- Mixed martial arts record from Sherdog

Adrienna Jenkins (born July 22, 1984) is an American mixed martial artist who competes in the Women's Featherweight division of Bellator. She currently works as a MMA referee/ judge.

== Mixed martial arts career ==
Jenkins made her MMA debut in 2004, at WEC 9 - Cold Blooded against Keri Scarr. She won by disqualification after she was hit with an illegal upkick and knee.

Jenkins fought Alisa Cantwell at XFO 3 losing in the first round via submission due to punches. She quickly returned in a month after submitting Shelby Walker at HOOKnSHOOT - Evolution 2.

Jenkins went undefeated from November 6, 2004 to February 10, 2007 with a record of 10-1. Her streak ended when she took on Kelly Kobold. Jenkins quickly rebounded off the loss by winning her next 7 fights with one of those wins coming over Bellator & Invicta FC Sarah Schneider in the first round of the FCF Women's Bantamweight Grand Prix.

Jenkins took on Jan Finney in the semi-finals, losing via split decision. Jenkins then replaced Finney in the finals of the tournament after FCF released her so she could fight in Strikeforce. Adrienna was now taking on future UFC vet Shayna Baszler in the Grand Prix final. She lost via first round submission.

Jenkins lost her third straight fight when she took on Tonya Evinger at RW 8 - Cage Supremacy, which saw Jenkins leave the sport.

Jenkins made a return after five-year hiatus to take on Kelsey Jorgenson. She won via TKO in just 27 seconds.

=== Bellator ===
Jenkins made her Bellator debut at Bellator 137 taking on Arlene Blencowe. she lost via TKO.

Jenkins returned at Bellator 141 against Lissette Neri. she won via first-round TKO.

== Mixed martial arts record ==
Professional record breakdown
25 matches	19 wins	6 losses
By knockout	8	2
By submission	10	3
By decision	0	1
By disqualification	1	0

Res.	Record	Opponent	Method	Event	Date	Round	Time	Location	Notes
Win	19-6	Lissette Neri	TKO (Punches)	Bellator 141	August 28, 2015	1	2:38	Temecula, California, United States	
Loss	18-6	Arlene Blencowe	TKO (Punches)	Bellator 137	May 15, 2015	1	4:08	Temecula, California, United States	
Win	18-5	Kelsey Jorgenson	TKO (Punches)	Gladiator Challenge - California State Championship Series	April 11, 2015	1	0:27	San Jacinto, California, United States	
Loss	17-5	Tonya Evinger	TKO (Elbows and Punches)	RW 8 - Cage Supremacy	July 17, 2010	2	3:16	Salamanca, New York, United States	
Loss	17-4	Shayna Baszler	Submission (Armbar)	Freestyle Cage Fighting 42	June 12, 2010	1	2:12	Shawnee, Oklahoma, United States	FCF Grand Prix Finals. (Jenkins replaced Finney she signed with Strikeforce.)
Loss	17-3	Jan Finney	Decision (Split)	Freestyle Cage Fighting 40	March 27, 2010	3	5:00	Shawnee, Oklahoma, United States	FCF Grand Prix Semi-finals.
Win	17-2	Sarah Schneider	Submission (Rear-Naked Choke)	Freestyle Cage Fighting 39	January 30, 2010	2	3:07	Shawnee, Oklahoma, United States	FCF Grand Prix Quarter-finals.
Win	16-2	Krista Stufflebeem	TKO (Punches)	Extreme Challenge 137	October 17, 2009	1	1:06	Iowa, United States	
Win	15-2	Sarah Patterson	Submission (Armbar)	MFC 8 - Ultimate Outlaws	August 14, 2009	1	1:36	Iowa, United States	
Win	14-2	Sarah Oriza	Submission (Rear-Naked Choke)	The Cage Inc. - Battle at the Border 2	June 12, 2009	1	1:03	Hankinson, North Dakota, United States	
Win	13-2	Jessica Nickerson	Submission (Punches)	Extreme Challenge 127	April 25, 2009	1	0:51	Iowa, United States	
Win	12-2	Constance Griffiths	TKO (Punches)	MFC 3 - Outdoor War	August 16, 2008	1	1:53	Centerville, Iowa, United States	
Win	11-2	Akulina Kvokov	TKO (Punches)	MCF 3 - Contagious	May 5, 2007	1	0:37	Iowa, United States	
Loss	10-2	Kelly Kobold	Submission (Punches)	NFF - The Breakout	March 10, 2007	1	3:26	Minneapolis, Minnesota, United States	
Win	10-1	Brook Scott	Submission (Punches)	Royalty Fight Night 2	February 10, 2007	1	0:30	Emmetsburg, Iowa, United States	
Win	9-1	Heather Brade	Submission (Punches)	War Party Cage Fighting 4	November 11, 2006	1	0:27	Marshalltown, Iowa, United States	
Win	8-1	Lindsay Franks	TKO (Punches)	Extreme Challenge 73	October 28, 2006	1	0:46	Davenport, Iowa, United States	
Win	7-1	Samantha Smith	Submission (Armbar)	FF 3 - Helena Havoc	September 9, 2006	1	0:56	Helena, Montana, United States	
Win	6-1	Sonya Sargeant	TKO (Punches)	Greensparks - Full Contact Fighting 1	August 19, 2006	1	N\A	Clive, Iowa, United States	
Win	5-1	Samantha Smith	Submission (Armbar)	Extreme Challenge 69	July 22, 2006	1	2:07	Davenport, Iowa, United States	
Win	4-1	Amanda Marohl	TKO (Punches)	MCC 2 - Midwest Xplosion	April 8, 2006	1	1:00	Des Moines, Iowa, United States	
Win	3-1	Cindy Romero	Submission (Slam)	UCS - Battle at the Barn 10	September 10, 2005	1	N\A	Rochester, Minnesota, United States	
Win	2-1	Shelby Walker	Submission (Rear-Naked Choke)	HOOKnSHOOT - Evolution 2	November 6, 2004	1	1:27	Evansville, Indiana, United States	
Loss	1-1	Alisa Cantwell	Submission (Punches)	XFO 3	October 2, 2004	1	1:17	Lakemoor, Illinois, United States	
Win	1-0	Keri Scarr	DQ (Illegal Soccer Kick and Knee)	WEC 9	January 16, 2004	1	N\A	Lemoore, California, United States	

== See also ==
- List of current Bellator fighters
- List of female mixed martial artists
