= Sara McMann =

American mixed martial artist and freestyle wrestler (born 1980)

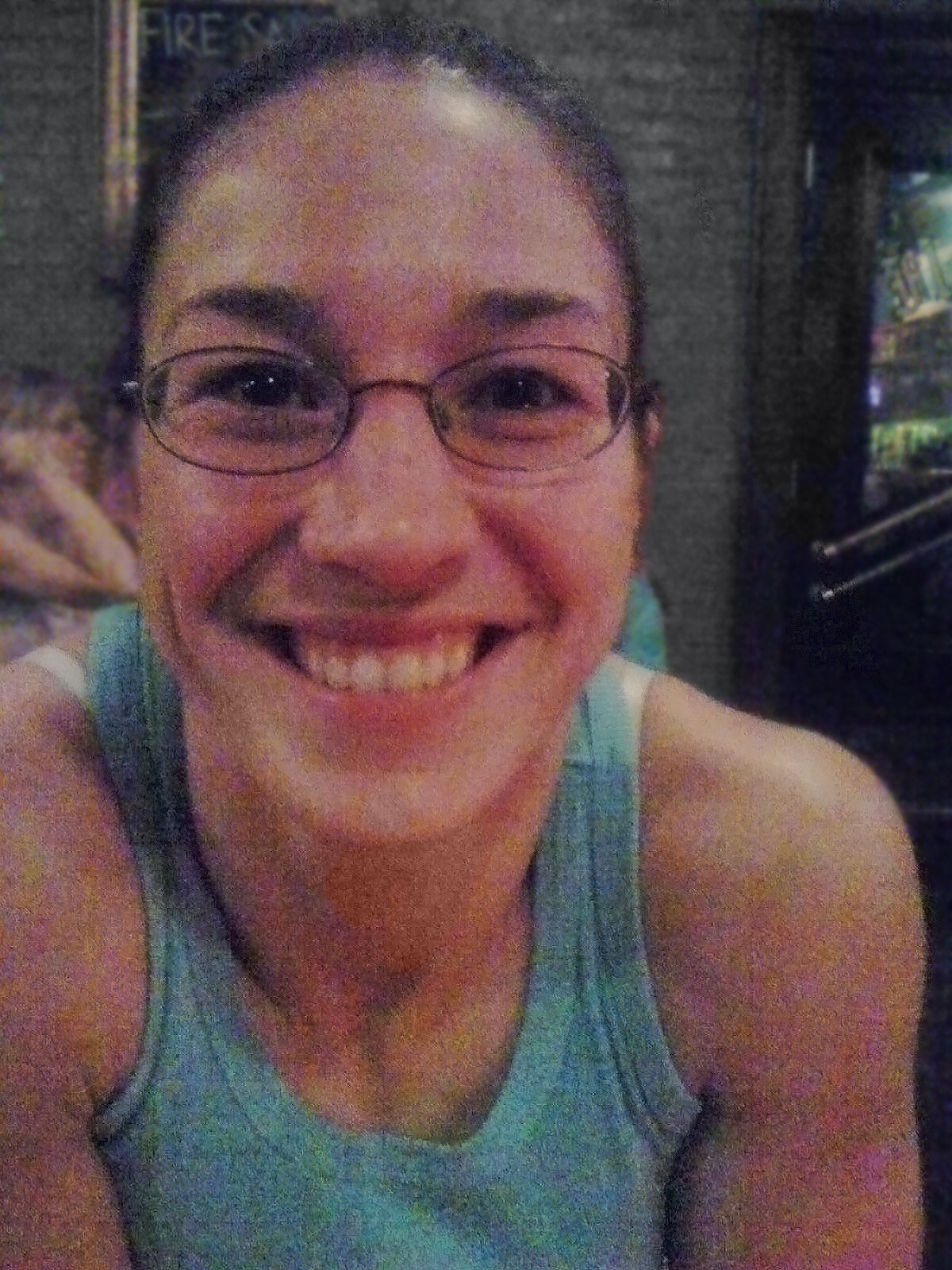
- Born: September 24, 1980 (age 46); Takoma Park, Maryland, U.S.
- Height: 5 ft 5 in (1.65 m)
- Weight: 145 lb (66 kg; 10.4 st)
- Division: Bantamweight
- Reach: 66 in (168 cm)
- Style: Wrestling
- Stance: Orthodox
- Fighting out of: Sacramento, California, U.S.
- Team: Team Alpha Male
- Wrestling: Olympic Freestyle Wrestling

Mixed martial arts record
- Total: 21
- Wins: 14
- By knockout: 1
- By submission: 5
- By decision: 8
- Losses: 7
- By knockout: 2
- By submission: 4
- By decision: 1

Other information
- University: Gardner–Webb University; Lock Haven University of Pennsylvania; University of Minnesota Morris
- Notable school: McDowell High School (NC)
- Mixed martial arts record from Sherdog

Sara McMann (born September 24, 1980) is an American mixed martial artist currently signed to Bellator MMA, competing in the Women's Featherweight division. She is a former Olympic wrestler and received a silver medal at the 2004 Summer Olympics in Athens and was a World Silver Medalist and two-time Bronze Medalist. She would then transition to MMA, most notably competing in the bantamweight division of the Ultimate Fighting Championship (UFC)

== Wrestling ==
McMann started wrestling at the age of 14 at McDowell High School in Marion, North Carolina. She is the first American woman in history to win a medal in Olympic wrestling, earning a silver medal at the 2004 Summer Olympics. McMann won a silver medal at the 2003 World Championships and a bronze medal at the 2005 and 2007 World Championships in women's freestyle 63 kg or 138.75 lb weight class.

In 2022, McMann was inducted to the National Wrestling Hall of Fame as a Distinguished Member.

== Mixed martial arts career ==
McMann announced in late 2010 that she had signed a three-fight contract with Strikeforce. She planned to fight at 135 pounds. However, she did not sign on with the promotion due to an extension clause in the contract.

McMann was first scheduled to make her professional mixed martial arts debut on November 14, 2010 in Jamaica, but the event was cancelled due to safety problems with the cage.

She then had more fights fall apart after opponents backed out, including a scheduled April 30, 2011 fight against Mariah Johnson.

On May 28, 2011, McMann made her pro MMA debut at Universal Cage Combat: Revolution. She defeated Christina Marks by submission in the first round.

McMann faced fellow Olympian Julie Malenfant at Blackeye Promotions 4 on June 17, 2011. McMann defeated Malenfant by TKO early in the first round.

McMann faced Tonya Evinger at Titan Fighting Championships 19 on July 29, 2011. The fight served as the co-main event. McMann defeated Evinger by unanimous decision.

=== ProElite ===
After ProElite reincarnated under new management, McMann faced Raquel Pa'aluhi on the promotion's first event post-EliteXC at ProElite 1: Arlovski vs. Lopez on August 27, 2011. She defeated Pa'aluhi by submission due to an americana in the third round.

McMann returned to ProElite to face Hitomi Akano at ProElite 3 on January 21, 2012. She defeated Akano by unanimous decision.

=== Invicta Fighting Championships ===
On April 28, it was announced that McMann would face Shayna Baszler in the main event of Invicta Fighting Championships 2. The event took place on July 28, 2012. McMann defeated Baszler via unanimous decision and the bout was named fight of the night. The bout was a title eliminator, with the winner scheduled to face the winner of Alexis Davis vs. Hitomi Akano.

=== Strikeforce ===
On September 4, 2012, it was announced McMann had signed with Strikeforce. She was expected to debut at Strikeforce: Cormier vs. Mir against former bantamweight title challenger Liz Carmouche, but the event was cancelled.

=== Ultimate Fighting Championship ===
In February 2013, McMann officially joined the Ultimate Fighting Championship (UFC). It was rumored she turned down a fight with then-title holder Ronda Rousey. However, this was false information and no such fight was offered or even presented to McMann at the time. She became the third female to earn a victory in the UFC by defeating Sheila Gaff at UFC 159.

McMann was slated to face former Strikeforce champion Sarah Kaufman on August 28, 2013 at UFC Fight Night 27. However, McMann withdrew from the bout for, at the time, undisclosed personal reasons. In January 2015, she disclosed that the reason for withdrawing was due to her father battling aggressive lymphoma.

McMann faced Ronda Rousey for the UFC Women's Bantamweight Championship at UFC 170. She lost the fight by TKO after getting knocked down with a knee to the body. This stoppage created controversy, with many sports writers and attendants finding it premature.

McMann faced promotional newcomer Lauren Murphy at UFC Fight Night 47 on August 16, 2014. McMann won the fight by split decision.

McMann faced Miesha Tate at UFC 183 on January 31, 2015. Despite a strong first round, she lost by majority decision.

McMann faced Amanda Nunes on August 8, 2015 at UFC Fight Night 73. She lost the fight via submission in the first round.

McMann faced Jessica Eye at UFC Fight Night 88 on May 29, 2016. She won the fight via unanimous decision.

McMann faced Alexis Davis on December 3, 2016 at The Ultimate Fighter: Tournament of Champions. McMann won via submission in the second round. This fight earned her a Performance of the Night award.

McMann was expected to face Liz Carmouche at UFC Fight Night 105, on February 19, 2017. However, Carmouche was forced to pull out of the fight due to injury and will be replaced by newcomer Gina Mazany. McMann won the fight via submission early in the first round.

McMann was originally expected to face Ketlen Vieira at UFC 214 on July 29, 2017. However, the fight was moved to UFC 215. She lost the bout via arm-triangle choke submission in the second round.

McMann faced Marion Reneau on February 24, 2018 at UFC on Fox 28. After dominating the first round, McMann was knocked down and submitted by Reneau in the second round.

After a year hiatus due to maternity leave, McMann was scheduled to face Nicco Montaño on July 13, 2019 at UFC on ESPN+ 13. However, McMann pulled out of the bout citing an injury in mid-June and was replaced by Julianna Peña.

McMann faced Lina Länsberg on January 25, 2020 at UFC Fight Night 166. She won the fight via unanimous decision.

McMann was scheduled to face Aspen Ladd on June 27, 2020 at UFC on ESPN: Poirier vs. Hooker. However, Ladd suffered a training injury, torn both her ACL and MCL and was forced to withdraw from the event.

McMann was expected to face Julianna Peña on January 16, 2021 at UFC on ABC 1 before being pushed back a week later to UFC 257 on January 24, 2021. McMann lost the fight via submission in round three.

McMann was scheduled to face Ketlen Vieira on August 28, 2021 at UFC on ESPN 30. However, McMann announced in mid August that a "reinjury" forced her out of the bout.

McMann faced Karol Rosa on March 26, 2022 at UFC on ESPN 33. She won the fight by unanimous decision.

McMann was scheduled to face Aspen Ladd on August 13, 2022, at UFC on ESPN 41. However, Ladd was tested positive for COVID-19 and she was forced to withdraw from the event, and they were rescheduled for UFC Fight Night 210 on September 17. At the weigh-ins, Ladd weighed in at 138 pounds, two pounds over the bantamweight non-title fight limit. As a result the bout was scrapped.

The cancelled bout against Ladd was counted as her last bout of her contract and she was paid her show money, with McMann now being a free agent and exploring potential possibilities.

=== Bellator MMA ===
On December 27, 2022, it was announced that McMann had signed with the Bellator MMA.

McMann made her promotional debut against Arlene Blencowe on April 21, 2023 at Bellator 294. She won the bout via unanimous decision.

McMann faced Leah McCourt on October 7, 2023 at Bellator 300. She lost the fight via ground and pound TKO in the first round.

== Personal life ==
McMann's parents are Paula Jean and Thomas William McMann. She has one sister, Nickolina, and had one brother, Jason. Jason, who wrestled at Quince Orchard High School in Gaithersburg, Maryland, was murdered January 23, 1999 at the age of 21.

McMann attended McDowell High School in Marion, North Carolina where she was coached by Timothy Hutchins. In addition to wrestling, she participated in theatre productions. She earned a degree in Theatre at Lock Haven University of Pennsylvania in Lock Haven, Pennsylvania, where she was a member of the school's wrestling team under the coaching of Carl Poff from 1999 to 2003. She previously attended University of Minnesota Morris from 1998 to 1999, where she was coached by Doug Reese.

In August 2010, McMann was awarded an MA/EDS with a major in mental health counseling from Gardner-Webb University in Boiling Springs, North Carolina.

McMann does volunteer work for Habitat for Humanity, a Christian housing ministry. She traveled to Sri Lanka with Olympic teammates to help victims of the tsunami rebuild homes for those displaced by the tidal wave. She also helps with youth clubs and speaks to upcoming girls and boys about wrestling.

On September 3, 2004, while driving her Jeep in Colorado on the way to Iowa with her fiance, former ASU three-time NCAA All-American wrestler Steven Blackford as her passenger, the vehicle ran off the road and rolled over. He was ejected from the vehicle, and died at the scene. McMann was hospitalized with a broken arm and minor injuries, and later charged with careless driving.

McMann and her former training partner Trent Goodale have a daughter, Bella, who was born in 2009.

On May 30, 2018, McMann announced on social media that she and her partner Chad Bingham were expecting a child, and that she had put her career in mixed martial arts on hold. In December 2018, she announced that she had given birth to her son, Lucas.

== World/Olympic matches ==
Res.	Record	Opponent	Score	Date	Event	Location	Notes
Win	13-10	(France) Lise LeGrand-Golliot	2-1, 4-1	2007-09-17	2007 World Wrestling Championships	Baku, Azerbaijan	Bronze Medal
Win	12-10	(China) Haiyan Xu	Fall	2007-09-17	2007 World Wrestling Championships	Baku, Azerbaijan	
Win	11-10	(Venezuela) Rojas Y Urbina	Fall	2007-09-17	2007 World Wrestling Championships	Baku, Azerbaijan	
Loss	10-10	(Japan) Kaori Icho	1-2, 0-1	2007-09-17	2007 World Wrestling Championships	Baku, Azerbaijan	
Loss	10-9	(Poland) Monika Rogien	0-1, 1-2	2006-09-25	2006 World Wrestling Championships	Guangzhou, China	
Win	10-8	(Colombia) Sandra Amado	1-0, 6-0	2006-09-25	2006 World Wrestling Championships	Guangzhou, China	
Win	9-8	(Russia) Anna Polovneva	1-2, 2-1, 4-2	2005-10-02	2005 World Wrestling Championships	Budapest, Hungary	Bronze Medal
Win	8-8	(Sweden) Helena Allandi	2-5, 4-2, 2-2	2005-10-02	2005 World Wrestling Championships	Budapest, Hungary	
Loss	7-8	(Japan) Kaori Icho	3-2, 2-1	2005-10-02	2005 World Wrestling Championships	Budapest, Hungary	
Loss	7-7	(Japan) Kaori Icho	2-3	2004-10-02	2004 Olympic Games	Athens, Greece	Silver Medal
Win	7-6	(Greece) Stavroula Zigouri	Fall	2004-10-02	2004 Olympic Games	Athens, Greece	
Loss	6-6	(Canada) Viola Yanik	2-5	2004-10-02	2004 Olympic Games	Athens, Greece	
Win	6-5	(China) Meng Lili	Fall	2004-10-02	2004 Olympic Games	Athens, Greece	
Loss	5-5	(Japan) Kaori Icho	3-4	2003-09-11	2003 World Wrestling Championships	New York City, United States	Silver Medal
Win	5-4	(Canada) Viola Yanik	Fall	2003-09-11	2003 World Wrestling Championships	New York City, United States	
Win	4-4	(Latvia) Kristine Odrina	11-0	2003-09-11	2003 World Wrestling Championships	New York City, United States	
Win	3-4	(Sweden) Sara Eriksson	Fall	2003-09-11	2003 World Wrestling Championships	New York City, United States	
Loss	2-4	(Japan) Kaori Icho	Fall	2002-11-01	2002 World Wrestling Championships	Chalkida, Greece	
Win	2-3	(South Korea) Yoon So-Young	11-0	2002-11-01	2002 World Wrestling Championships	Chalkida, Greece	
Loss	1-3	(China) Meng Lili	2-6	2001-11-22	2001 World Wrestling Championships	Sofia, Bulgaria	
Loss	1-2	(Japan) Rena Iwama	2-5	2001-11-22	2001 World Wrestling Championships	Sofia, Bulgaria	
Loss	1-1	(Austria) Nikola Hartmann	2-5	2000-09-03	2000 World Wrestling Championships	Sofia, Bulgaria	
win	1-0	(Greece) Sofia Kampanari	Fall	2000-09-03	2000 World Wrestling Championships	Sofia, Bulgaria	

== Championships and accomplishments ==
=== Mixed martial arts ===
- Ultimate Fighting Championship
  - Performance of the Night (One time) vs. Alexis Davis
  - Third most takedowns landed in UFC Women's Bantamweight division history (27)
  - Tied (Marion Reneau, Irene Aldana & Holly Holm) for third most bouts in UFC Women's Bantamweight division history (13)
  - Most control time in UFC Women's Bantamweight division history (1:10:22)
  - Highest control time percentage in UFC Women's Bantamweight division history (56.9%)
  - Most top-position time in UFC Women's Bantamweight division history (59:55)
  - Highest top-position percentage in UFC Women's Bantamweight division history (48.4%)
  - Fourth highest takedown accuracy percentage in UFC Women's Bantamweight division history (56.3%)
  - UFC.com Awards
    - 2013: Ranked #6 Newcomer of the Year
- Invicta Fighting Championships
  - Fight of the Night (One time)
- Women's MMA Awards
  - 2011 Mighty Mia Inspirational Fighter of the Year

=== Submission grappling ===
- ADCC Submission Wrestling World Championship
  - 2011 North American Championships Silver Medalist
- International Federation of Associated Wrestling Styles
  - 2009 FILA Grappling World Championships Senior Women's No-Gi Gold Medalist
- USA Wrestling
  - FILA World Team Trials Senior Women's No-Gi 3rd Place (2009)
- North American Grappling Association
  - 2014 North American Championships Women's No-Gi Gold Medalist
  - 2011 North Carolina Championships Women's No-Gi Gold Medalist
  - 2010 Southeast Championships Women's No-Gi Gold Medalist
  - 2009 Southeast Championships Women's No-Gi Gold Medalist

=== Amateur wrestling ===
- International Olympic Committee
  - 2004 Summer Olympics Senior Women's Freestyle Silver Medalist
- International Federation of Associated Wrestling Styles
  - 2009 Sunkist Kids International Open Senior Women's Freestyle Gold Medalist
  - 2007 NYAC Holiday International Open Senior Women's Freestyle Silver Medalist
  - 2007 Sunkist Kids International Open Senior Women's Freestyle Gold Medalist
  - 2007 FILA Wrestling World Championships Senior Women's Freestyle Bronze Medalist
  - 2007 Warsaw Cup Senior Women's Freestyle Gold Medalist
  - 2007 Pan American Games Senior Women's Freestyle Gold Medalist
  - 2007 World Cup Senior Women's Freestyle Gold Medalist
  - 2007 Klippan Lady's Open Senior Women's Freestyle Gold Medalist
  - 2007 Dave Schultz Memorial International Open Senior Women's Freestyle Silver Medalist
  - 2006 World Cup Senior Women's Freestyle Bronze Medalist
  - 2005 FILA Wrestling World Championships Senior Women's Freestyle Bronze Medalist
  - 2004 Dave Schultz Memorial International Open Senior Women's Freestyle Bronze Medalist
  - 2004 Manitoba Open Senior Women's Freestyle Gold Medalist
  - 2004 FILA Olympic Test Tournament Senior Women's Freestyle Gold Medalist
  - 2003 NYAC Christmas International Open Senior Women's Freestyle Gold Medalist
  - 2003 Women's Championship Cup of Wrestling Senior Women's Freestyle Silver Medalist
  - 2003 Sunkist Kids International Open Senior Women's Freestyle Gold Medalist
  - 2003 World Cup Senior Women's Freestyle Silver Medalist
  - 2003 FILA Wrestling World Championships Senior Women's Freestyle Silver Medalist
  - 2003 Pan American Games Senior Women's Freestyle Gold Medalist
  - 2003 Klippan Lady's Open Senior Women's Freestyle Gold Medalist
  - 2003 Dave Schultz Memorial International Open Senior Women's Freestyle Gold Medalist
  - 2002 Henri Deglane Challenge Senior Women's Freestyle Gold Medalist
  - 2002 Yarygin Memorial International Senior Women's Freestyle Silver Medalist
  - 2002 Klippan Lady's Open Senior Women's Freestyle Gold Medalist
  - 2001 Sunkist Kids International Open Senior Women's Freestyle Gold Medalist
  - 2001 Pan American Championships Senior Women's Freestyle Gold Medalist
  - 2001 Dave Schultz Memorial International Open Senior Women's Freestyle Gold Medalist
  - 2001 Manitoba Open Senior Women's Freestyle Gold Medalist
  - 2000 Clansman International Open Senior Women's Freestyle Gold Medalist
  - 2000 Sunkist Kids International Open Senior Women's Freestyle Gold Medalist
  - 2000 Pan American Championships Senior Women's Freestyle Silver Medalist
  - 2000 Dave Schultz Memorial International Open Senior Women's Freestyle Gold Medalist
- USA Wrestling
  - USA Senior Women's Freestyle Olympic Team Trials Winner (2004)
  - USA Senior Women's Freestyle Olympic Team Trials Runner-up (2008)
  - FILA Senior Women's Freestyle World Team Trials Winner (2000, 2001, 2002, 2003, 2005, 2006, 2007)
  - FILA Junior Women's Freestyle World Team Trials Winner (1999, 2000)
  - USA Senior Women's Freestyle National Championship (2000, 2002, 2003, 2005, 2006, 2007)
  - USA Senior Women's Freestyle National Championship Runner-up (2004, 2008)
  - USA University Women's Freestyle National Championship (2002)
  - USA University Women's Freestyle National Championship Runner-up (1998)
  - Northern Plains Senior Women's Freestyle Regional Championship (2008)
  - 2010 ASICS U.S. Open Wrestling Championships Senior Women's Freestyle Silver Medalist
  - 2006 Missouri Valley Showcase Senior Women's Freestyle Gold Medalist
- United States Girls' Wrestling Association
  - USGWA High School National Championship (1998)

== Mixed martial arts record ==
Professional record breakdown
21 matches	14 wins	7 losses
By knockout	1	2
By submission	5	4
By decision	8	1

Res.	Record	Opponent	Method	Event	Date	Round	Time	Location	Notes
Loss	14–7	Leah McCourt	TKO (punches)	Bellator 300	October 7, 2023	1	4:30	San Diego, California, United States	
Win	14–6	Arlene Blencowe	Decision (unanimous)	Bellator 294	April 21, 2023	3	5:00	Honolulu, Hawaii, United States	Featherweight debut.
Win	13–6	Karol Rosa	Decision (unanimous)	UFC on ESPN: Blaydes vs. Daukaus	March 26, 2022	3	5:00	Columbus, Ohio, United States	
Loss	12–6	Julianna Peña	Submission (rear-naked choke)	UFC 257	January 24, 2021	3	3:39	Abu Dhabi, United Arab Emirates	
Win	12–5	Lina Länsberg	Decision (unanimous)	UFC Fight Night: Blaydes vs. dos Santos	January 25, 2020	3	5:00	Raleigh, North Carolina, United States	
Loss	11–5	Marion Reneau	Submission (triangle choke)	UFC on Fox: Emmett vs. Stephens	February 24, 2018	2	3:40	Orlando, Florida, United States	
Loss	11–4	Ketlen Vieira	Submission (arm-triangle choke)	UFC 215	September 9, 2017	2	4:16	Edmonton, Alberta, Canada	
Win	11–3	Gina Mazany	Submission (arm-triangle choke)	UFC Fight Night: Lewis vs. Browne	February 19, 2017	1	1:14	Halifax, Nova Scotia, Canada	Catchweight (139.5 lb) bout; Mazany missed weight.
Win	10–3	Alexis Davis	Submission (arm-triangle choke)	The Ultimate Fighter: Tournament of Champions Finale	December 3, 2016	2	2:52	Las Vegas, Nevada, United States	Performance of the Night.
Win	9–3	Jessica Eye	Decision (unanimous)	UFC Fight Night: Almeida vs. Garbrandt	May 29, 2016	3	5:00	Las Vegas, Nevada, United States	
Loss	8–3	Amanda Nunes	Submission (rear-naked choke)	UFC Fight Night: Teixeira vs. Saint Preux	August 8, 2015	1	2:53	Nashville, Tennessee, United States	
Loss	8–2	Miesha Tate	Decision (majority)	UFC 183	January 31, 2015	3	5:00	Las Vegas, Nevada, United States	
Win	8–1	Lauren Murphy	Decision (split)	UFC Fight Night: Bader vs. St. Preux	August 16, 2014	3	5:00	Bangor, Maine, United States	
Loss	7–1	Ronda Rousey	TKO (knee to the body)	UFC 170	February 22, 2014	1	1:06	Las Vegas, Nevada, United States	For the UFC Women's Bantamweight Championship.
Win	7–0	Sheila Gaff	TKO (punches)	UFC 159	April 27, 2013	1	4:06	Newark, New Jersey, United States	
Win	6–0	Shayna Baszler	Decision (unanimous)	Invicta FC 2: Baszler vs. McMann	July 28, 2012	3	5:00	Kansas City, Kansas, United States	Invicta FC Bantamweight title eliminator. Fight of the Night.
Win	5–0	Hitomi Akano	Decision (unanimous)	ProElite 3: Da Spyder vs. Minowaman	January 21, 2012	3	5:00	Honolulu, Hawaii, United States	
Win	4–0	Raquel Pa'aluhi	Submission (americana)	ProElite 1: Arlovski vs. Lopez	August 27, 2011	3	2:53	Honolulu, Hawaii, United States	
Win	3–0	Tonya Evinger	Decision (unanimous)	Titan Fighting Championships 19	July 29, 2011	3	5:00	Kansas City, Kansas, United States	Catchweight (140 lb) bout.
Win	2–0	Julie Malenfant	Submission (punches)	BlackEye Promotions 4	June 17, 2011	1	0:32	Fletcher, North Carolina, United States	
Win	1–0	Christina Marks	Submission (rear-naked choke)	Universal Cage Combat: Revolution	May 28, 2011	1	1:41	Lawrenceburg, Indiana, United States	

== Pay-per-view bouts ==
No	Event	Fight	Date	Venue	City	PPV buys
1.	UFC 170	Rousey vs. McMann	February 22, 2014	Mandalay Bay Events Center	Las Vegas, Nevada, United States	340,000

== See also ==
- List of female mixed martial artists
