= Orlando Meléndez =

Puerto Rican basketball player (born 1979)

Orlando Meléndez "El Gato"
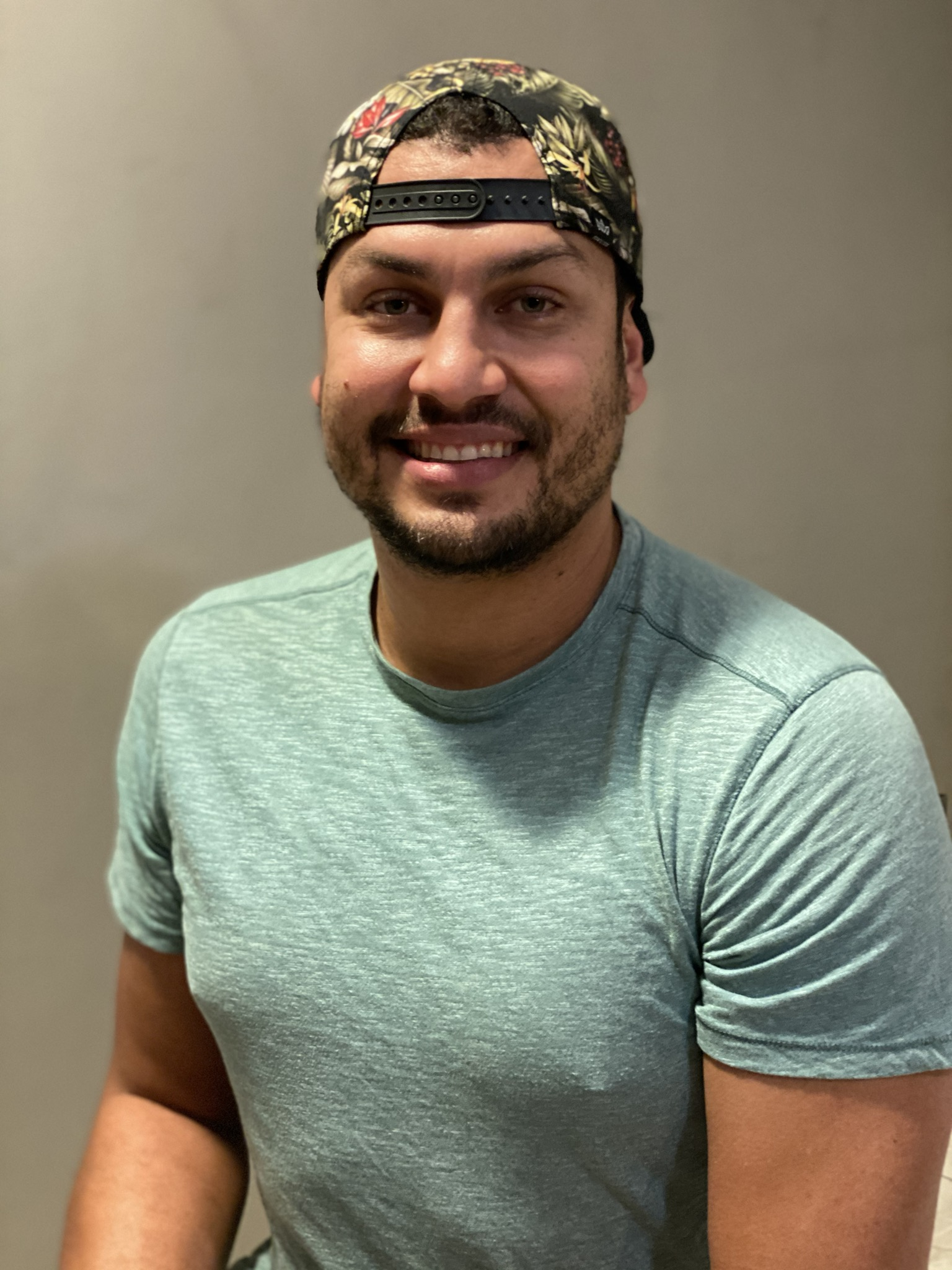

Personal information
- Born: 14 February 1979 (age 47) Ponce, Puerto Rico
- Listed height: 6 ft 8 in (2.03 m)

Career information
- High school: Colegio Ponceño (Ponce, Puerto Rico); McDowell (Marion, North Carolina)
- College: North Carolina (1997–2002)
- NBA draft: 2002: undrafted
- Position: Power forward
- Number: 39

Career history
- 2008: Harlem Globetrotters

Orlando Meléndez Gilbert, a.k.a. "El Gato" (The Cat) (born 14 February 1979), is a Puerto Rican basketball player. He is the first Puerto Rico-born basketball player to play for the Harlem Globetrotters.

== Early years ==
Meléndez was born in the city of Ponce, Puerto Rico, but was raised in the town of Juana Díaz, where he also received his primary and secondary education. When he was 14 years old, he would go home after school and with his basketball under his arm make take a 2-mile jog through the sugar cane fields every day to the nearest basketball court and practice the sport with the local kids. Running was in his blood since father used to run marathons, and his grandfather is a track and field expert.

He always grabbed a snack to eat during his trek and would drop crumbs along the way. As a result, whenever he arrived at the court he would be accompanied by an entourage of cats, thus his nickname "El Gato" (the cat). Melendez tried out for his Juana Díaz high school basketball team and was accepted. Through an exchange student program, he was able to play at McDowell High School in Marion, North Carolina, where he finished his senior year.

== North Carolina Tar Heels ==
In 1997, Meléndez was awarded a scholarship to the University of North Carolina. There he began his college basketball career by playing for the North Carolina Tar Heels, where he appeared in the Final Fours in 1998 and 2000. From 1998 to 2007, Melendez played for UNC and professionally in Europe and Puerto Rico. He played for:

- North Carolina (NCAA) 1998–1999, 2000–2001, 2002;
- Leones de Ponce 1999–2000; *Polluelos de Aibonito (Puerto Rico-BSN) 2001–2002;
- Toritos de Cayey (Puerto Rico-BSN), in May was traded to
- Los Atleticos de San German (Puerto Rico-BSN): 16 games; Atleticos de San German (Baloncesto Superior Nacional (BSN), starting five) 2003–2004, 2006;
- Grises Orientales de Humacao (SuperLeague 25, starting five) 2004;
- Indios de Mayagüez (BSN): 20 games 2004–2005;
- Guayanilla (SuperLeague 25, starting five) 2005;
- Gallitos de Isabela (BSN): 31 games 2006;
- Luxbasket camp in Wiltz 2006–2007:
- AS Soleuvre (LUX-DBBL): 11 games; in Dec.'06 try-out at Eiffel Towers Den Bosch (NED-Eredivisie), in Feb.'07 moved to
- Team Merry Monk Ballina (IRL-SuperLeague): 8 games, 2007; *Maratonistas de Coamo (BSN, starting five), in May moved to
- Cangrejeros de Santurce (BSN): 13 games, 2008; Cangrejeros de Santurce (BSN): Liga Americas: 6 games.

== Harlem Globetrotters ==
In 2007, Sam Worthen, the former Chicago Bulls and New Orleans Jazz guard, coached professionally in Puerto Rico. He also coached the Washington Generals the perennial Globetrotters punching bag. Worthen, impressed with Meléndez's ability to play and entertain suggested Meléndez try out for the Globetrotters after the two had bumped into each other outside the San Juan apartment building in which they both lived.

In 2008, Meléndez became the first Puerto Rico-born basketball player ever to play for the Harlem Globetrotters. He was not however, the first Hispanic of Puerto Rican descent to play for the Globetrotters. That distinction belongs to Orlando Antigua, whose mother is Puerto Rican and who in 1995 made Globetrotters history by becoming the first Hispanic and non-black to play for the team.

Meléndez whose position is that of "power forward", injured his knee during training camp. He had surgery to repair a torn lateral meniscus. Meléndez was well enough for the start of the 26 December domestic season.

== Awards and achievements ==
Among Meléndez's awards and achievements are the following:

- NCAA Final Four -2000
- ACC Champion Runner-Up -2001
- Puerto Rico National Team -2001-2002
- Puerto Rican PRSBL All Star Game -2001
- Central American Championships (Centrobasket) Champion -2001
- Tournament of the Americas (Copa América) in Neuquin (ARG) –2001 (Semifinals)
- "Gatorade" Dunking contest in the Puerto Rican All Star Game -2002
- Puerto Rican BSN Semifinals -2003
- Irish Superleague Finalist -2007
- Irish Superleague North Conference Runner-Up -2007
- Puerto Rican BSN Champion -2007

== See also ==
- List of Puerto Ricans
