= Alexis Davis (fighter) =

Canadian mixed martial artist (born 1984)

- Born: Alexis Evelyn Chris Davis; March 6, 1984 (age 42); Port Colborne, Ontario, Canada
- Other names: Ally-Gator
- Height: 5 ft 6 in (168 cm)
- Weight: 135 lb (61 kg; 9.6 st)
- Division: Bantamweight; Flyweight
- Reach: 67 in (170 cm)
- Fighting out of: Pleasanton, California
- Team: The Resistance
- Rank: Black belt in Jujutsu; Black belt in Brazilian Jiu-Jitsu

Mixed martial arts record
- Total: 32
- Wins: 21
- By knockout: 2
- By submission: 8
- By decision: 11
- Losses: 11
- By knockout: 3
- By submission: 1
- By decision: 7

Other information
- Mixed martial arts record from Sherdog

Alexis Evelyn Chris Davis (born March 6, 1984) is a Canadian mixed martial artist who competed in the Ultimate Fighting Championship (UFC) where she is a former Title challenger. She is a Canadian Open grappling champion.

== Early life ==
Davis was a young girl when she first became interested in martial arts. She was big fan of Action movies starring the likes of Jackie Chan, Jet Li and Jean-Claude Van Damme and was a big fan of boxing and later MMA. She was a youngster when she decided to start practicing martial arts and was around the age of 16 when she started jujutsu and BJJ at age of 18.

== Mixed martial arts career ==
=== Early career ===
Davis made her mixed martial arts debut on April 7, 2007, at UCW 7: Anarchy. She was defeated by former Strikeforce champion Sarah Kaufman via TKO in the third round. On December 14, 2007, Davis defeated Valérie Létourneau by split decision at TKO 31: Young Guns. The fight was the second women's bout in TKO history. Davis faced Liz Carreiro at FFF 4: Call of the Wild on April 3, 2008. She won the fight by unanimous decision.

On January 23, 2009, Davis faced Tara LaRosa at Extreme Challenge: The War at the Shore. She lost by TKO in the third round after the ringside doctor stopped the fight due to a cut. The fight was voted as the 2009 Women's MMA Fight of the Year. Davis defeated Molly Helsel by unanimous decision after five rounds at Raging Wolf 5: Mayhem In The Mist on October 10, 2009, to become Raging Wolf Women's Flyweight Champion.

On March 27, 2010, at FCF 40, Davis replaced Jennifer Tate in the second round of the Freestyle Cage Fighting Women's Bantamweight Grand Prix. She faced submission specialist Shayna Baszler and was defeated by unanimous decision. Davis was scheduled to face Elaina Maxwell at Raging Wolf 7: Mayhem In The Mist 3 on May 8, 2010, but Maxwell pulled out of the fight due to an injury. Davis defended her Raging Wolf title against Tonya Evinger instead. She won the fight and retained her title via rear-naked choke submission in the third round.

Davis' next fight was against Elaina Maxwell at Raging Wolf 9 on August 28, 2010. This fight was originally for the Raging Wolf Women's Flyweight Championship, but Maxwell was unable to make the 135 lbs weight limit, so the fight was changed to a non-title, three-round contest. Davis was defeated by unanimous decision. Davis successfully defended her title in a rematch with Evinger at Raging Wolf 10 on November 6, 2010. She once again submitted Evinger with a rear-naked choke. She was scheduled to challenge Shayna Baszler in a title fight rematch at The Cage Inc.: Battle At The Border 10 on July 30, 2011. However, the fight was cancelled after Davis signed with Strikeforce.

=== Strikeforce ===
Davis made her Strikeforce debut on July 30, 2011, against Julie Kedzie. She won the fight via unanimous decision. She faced Amanda Nunes on September 10, 2011, on the Strikeforce Grand Prix Semifinals card. She won the fight via TKO late in the second round. On January 7, 2012, it was announced that Davis would face Sarah Kaufman in a rematch at Strikeforce: Tate vs. Rousey on March 3, 2012, in Columbus, Ohio. She lost the back and forth bout via a very close majority decision.

=== Invicta Fighting Championships ===
Davis faced Hitomi Akano at Invicta FC 2: Baszler vs. McMann on July 28, 2012. She defeated Akano by submission due to a rear-naked choke in the second round and earned a Submission of the Night bonus. Davis faced Shayna Baszler in a rematch at Invicta FC 4: Esparza vs. Hyatt on January 5, 2013. Davis won the fight via technical submission due to a rear-naked choke in the third round. The bout was named Fight of the Night.

=== Ultimate Fighting Championship ===
On Feb 12, 2013, it was announced that both Davis and Sara McMann were signed to the UFC. Davis faced Rosi Sexton in her UFC debut at UFC 161 on June 15. She won the back-and-forth fight via unanimous decision. In her second UFC bout, Davis faced Liz Carmouche on November 6, 2013, at UFC Fight Night 31. She won the fight via unanimous decision. Davis faced Jessica Eye on February 22, 2014, at UFC 170. Davis won the fight via split decision.

Davis faced UFC Women's Bantamweight Champion Ronda Rousey for the belt at UFC 175 on July 5, 2014. She lost the fight via knockout sixteen seconds into the first round.

Davis faced Sarah Kaufman for a third time at UFC 186 on April 25, 2015. After losing the first round due to Kaufman's dominating striking, she won the fight via submission in the second round. Following this fight, Davis took time off due to pregnancy.

On October 19, 2016, it was announced that she would be making her return at The Ultimate Fighter 24 Finale on December 3, 2016 against Sara McMann She lost that fight via arm-triangle submission in the second round.

Davis next faced Cindy Dandois on April 22, 2017, at UFC Fight Night: Swanson vs. Lobov. She won the fight by unanimous decision.

Davis faced Liz Carmouche in a flyweight bout at UFC Fight Night: Swanson vs. Ortega on December 9, 2017. She won the fight by split decision.

Davis faced Katlyn Chookagian on July 28, 2018, at UFC on Fox 30. She lost the fight by unanimous decision.

Davis faced Jennifer Maia on March 23, 2019 at UFC Fight Night 148. She lost the fight via unanimous decision.

Davis faced Viviane Araújo on July 27, 2019 at UFC 240. She lost the fight via unanimous decision.

Davis faced Sabina Mazo in a return to bantamweight on February 27, 2021 at UFC Fight Night 186. She won the fight via unanimous decision.

Davis faced Pannie Kianzad on June 12, 2021 at UFC 263. In a competitive fight, Davis was able to out-land her opponent, though commentators frequently found her striking less effective, remaining notably uncertain of the winner at the end of the fight. This was ultimately not reflected in the scoring, with Davis winning only one round on one scorecard, in a unanimous decision loss.

Davis faced Julija Stoliarenko at UFC Fight Night 200 on February 5, 2022. She won the fight via unanimous decision. Later in that month, it was announced that she had fought out her prevailing contract and it was not renewed.

== Championships and accomplishments ==
- Invicta Fighting Championships
  - Submission of the Night (One time) vs. Hitomi Akano
  - Fight of the Night (One time) vs. Shayna Baszler
  - UFC.com Awards
    - 2013: Ranked #8 Import of the Year
- Raging Wolf MMA
  - RW Women's Bantamweight Championship (one time)
    - Two successful title defenses

== Mixed martial arts record ==
Professional record breakdown
32 matches	21 wins	11 losses
By knockout	2	3
By submission	8	1
By decision	11	7

Res.	Record	Opponent	Method	Event	Date	Round	Time	Location	Notes
Win	21–11	Julija Stoliarenko	Decision (unanimous)	UFC Fight Night: Hermansson vs. Strickland	February 5, 2022	3	5:00	Las Vegas, Nevada, United States	
Loss	20–11	Pannie Kianzad	Decision (unanimous)	UFC 263	June 12, 2021	3	5:00	Glendale, Arizona, United States	
Win	20–10	Sabina Mazo	Decision (unanimous)	UFC Fight Night: Rozenstruik vs. Gane	February 27, 2021	3	5:00	Las Vegas, Nevada, United States	Return to Bantamweight.
Loss	19–10	Viviane Araújo	Decision (unanimous)	UFC 240	July 27, 2019	3	5:00	Edmonton, Alberta, Canada	
Loss	19–9	Jennifer Maia	Decision (unanimous)	UFC Fight Night: Thompson vs. Pettis	March 23, 2019	3	5:00	Nashville, Tennessee, United States	
Loss	19–8	Katlyn Chookagian	Decision (unanimous)	UFC on Fox: Alvarez vs. Poirier 2	July 28, 2018	3	5:00	Calgary, Alberta, Canada	
Win	19–7	Liz Carmouche	Decision (split)	UFC Fight Night: Swanson vs. Ortega	December 9, 2017	3	5:00	Fresno, California, United States	Flyweight debut.
Win	18–7	Cindy Dandois	Decision (unanimous)	UFC Fight Night: Swanson vs. Lobov	April 22, 2017	3	5:00	Nashville, Tennessee, United States	
Loss	17–7	Sara McMann	Submission (arm-triangle choke)	The Ultimate Fighter: Tournament of Champions Finale	December 3, 2016	2	2:52	Las Vegas, Nevada, United States	
Win	17–6	Sarah Kaufman	Submission (armbar)	UFC 186	April 25, 2015	2	1:52	Montreal, Quebec Canada	
Loss	16–6	Ronda Rousey	KO (punches)	UFC 175	July 5, 2014	1	0:16	Las Vegas, Nevada, United States	For the UFC Women's Bantamweight Championship.
Win	16–5	Jessica Eye	Decision (split)	UFC 170	February 22, 2014	3	5:00	Las Vegas, Nevada, United States	
Win	15–5	Liz Carmouche	Decision (unanimous)	UFC: Fight for the Troops 3	November 6, 2013	3	5:00	Fort Campbell, Kentucky, United States	
Win	14–5	Rosi Sexton	Decision (unanimous)	UFC 161	June 15, 2013	3	5:00	Winnipeg, Manitoba, Canada	
Win	13–5	Shayna Baszler	Technical Submission (rear-naked choke)	Invicta FC 4: Esparza vs. Hyatt	January 5, 2013	3	0:58	Kansas City, Kansas, United States	Fight of the Night.
Win	12–5	Hitomi Akano	Submission (rear-naked choke)	Invicta FC 2: Baszler vs. McMann	July 28, 2012	2	3:41	Kansas City, Kansas, United States	Submission of the Night.
Loss	11–5	Sarah Kaufman	Decision (majority)	Strikeforce: Tate vs. Rousey	March 3, 2012	3	5:00	Columbus, Ohio, United States	
Win	11–4	Amanda Nunes	TKO (punches)	Strikeforce: Barnett vs. Kharitonov	September 10, 2011	2	4:53	Cincinnati, Ohio, United States	
Win	10–4	Julie Kedzie	Decision (unanimous)	Strikeforce: Fedor vs. Henderson	July 30, 2011	3	5:00	Hoffman Estates, Illinois, United States	
Win	9–4	Tonya Evinger	Submission (rear-naked choke)	RW 10: Mayhem In The Mist 5	November 6, 2010	1	1:25	Niagara Falls, New York, United States	Defended the Raging Wolf Women's Bantamweight Championship.
Loss	8–4	Elaina Maxwell	Decision (unanimous)	RW 9: Mayhem In The Mist 4	August 28, 2010	3	5:00	Niagara Falls, New York, United States	Non-title bout; Maxwell missed weight.
Win	8–3	Tonya Evinger	Submission (rear-naked choke)	RW 7: Mayhem In The Mist 3	May 8, 2010	3	1:47	Niagara Falls, New York, United States	Defended the Raging Wolf Women's Bantamweight Championship.
Loss	7–3	Shayna Baszler	Decision (unanimous)	Freestyle Cage Fighting 40	March 27, 2010	3	5:00	Shawnee, Oklahoma, United States	
Win	7–2	Molly Helsel	Decision (unanimous)	RW 5: Mayhem In The Mist	October 10, 2009	5	5:00	Niagara Falls, New York, United States	Won the Raging Wolf Women's Bantamweight Championship.
Loss	6–2	Tara LaRosa	TKO (doctor stoppage)	Extreme Challenge: The War At The Shore	January 23, 2009	3	4:23	Atlantic City, New Jersey, United States	
Win	6–1	Margarita Kolmykova	Submission (rear-naked choke)	USFL: War In The Woods 5	November 29, 2008	1	1:02	Ledyard, Connecticut, United States	Featherweight bout.
Win	5–1	Kate Roy	Submission (armbar)	Ultimate Cage Wars 12	June 27, 2008	1	3:09	Winnipeg, Manitoba, Canada	
Win	4–1	Lizbeth Carreiro	Decision (unanimous)	FFF 4: Call Of The Wild	April 3, 2008	3	3:00	Los Angeles, California, United States	
Win	3–1	Valérie Létourneau	Decision (split)	TKO 31: Young Guns	December 14, 2007	3	5:00	Montreal, Quebec, Canada	
Win	2–1	Tannaya Hantelman	Submission (armbar)	ECC 6: Hometown Heroes	October 20, 2007	1	1:09	Halifax, Nova Scotia, Canada	
Win	1–1	Jody Wadsworth	TKO (punches)	KO Boxing: Warzone	May 6, 2007	1	3:17	Edmonton, Alberta, Canada	
Loss	0–1	Sarah Kaufman	TKO (punches)	UCW 7: Anarchy	April 7, 2007	3	N/A	Winnipeg, Manitoba, Canada	

== Championships and achievements ==
- Raging Wolf MMA
  - Raging Wolf Women's Bantamweight Championship (One time)
- Invicta FC
  - Fight of the Night (One time) vs. Shayna Baszler
- Ultimate Fighting Championship
  - First Canadian Woman to Fight in the UFC
  - First Canadian Woman to Win a Fight in the UFC
- Women's MMA Awards
  - 2009 Fight of the Year vs. Tara LaRosa
  - 2012 Fight of the Year vs. Sarah Kaufman

== See also ==
- List of Canadian UFC fighters
- List of female mixed martial artists
