= Tara LaRosa =

American martial artist

Tara Nicole LaRosa
- Born: January 8, 1978 (age 48); Woodstown, New Jersey, United States
- Nationality: American
- Height: 5 ft 6 in (1.68 m)
- Weight: 134 lb (61 kg; 9.6 st)
- Division: Bantamweight
- Style: Grappling, Judo, Brazilian Jiu-Jitsu
- Team: FUSE MMA
- Rank: Purple belt in Brazilian jiu-jitsu under Royce Gracie; Black belt in judo

Mixed martial arts record
- Total: 27
- Wins: 22
- By knockout: 3
- By submission: 12
- By decision: 7
- Losses: 5
- By knockout: 1
- By decision: 4

Other information
- Mixed martial arts record from Sherdog

Tara LaRosa
Medal record

Representing United States

Women's Submission grappling

ADCC Submission Wrestling World Championship
Silver medal – second place	2005 Long Beach	Open
Silver medal – second place	2007 Trenton	-60 kg

FILA Grappling World Championships
Gold medal – first place	2007 Antalya	-63 kg (No Gi)
Gold medal – first place	2009 Fort Lauderdale	-59 kg (Gi)
Gold medal – first place	2009 Fort Lauderdale	Open (Gi)
Silver medal – second place	2008 Lucerne	-55 kg (Gi)
Silver medal – second place	2009 Fort Lauderdale	-59 kg (No Gi)
Silver medal – second place	2010 Cracow	Open (No Gi)
Bronze medal – third place	2008 Lucerne	-55 kg (No Gi)
Bronze medal – third place	2010 Cracow	-60 kg (No Gi)

NAGA Grappling World Championships
Gold medal – first place	2006 Jersey City	-61 kg (No Gi)
Gold medal – first place	2006 Jersey City	-73 kg (Blue)
Gold medal – first place	2007 Jersey City	-61 kg (No Gi)
Silver medal – second place	2006 Jersey City	-61 kg (Blue)

Tara Nicole LaRosa (born January 8, 1978) is an American mixed martial artist and grappler whose most high-profile successes occurred while competing in BodogFight, where she became the first and only BodogFight Women's Bantamweight (135 lbs) Champion. She later defeated HOOKnSHOOT 125-pound champion Cody Welchlin in a non-title bout at a HOOKnSHOOT/BodogFight co-sponsored event.

LaRosa has spent most of her career competing at bantamweight, although her natural weight class is the flyweight division. She dominated the bantamweight division during her seven years in it, and became a flyweight in 2009. Per Fight Matrix, she was #1 at flyweight between 2010 and 2012. She holds wins over top mixed martial arts fighters such as Amanda Buckner, Kelly Kobold, Shayna Baszler, Alexis Davis, Julie Kedzie, Sally Krumdiack and Takayo Hashi.

She has lived in eight different cities over the course of a decade in order to train at different gyms. During 2006, LaRosa trained and fought out of Rich Guerin's Yakima MMA gym in Yakima. Starting in April 2007, she trained out of Charles McCarthy's American Top Team affiliate for 6 months in Boca Raton. In September 2007 she joined the Philadelphia Fight Factory and trained with fighters like Zach Makovsky and Eddie Alvarez. LaRosa trained at Ivan Salaverry MMA in Seattle. She moved to Albuquerque, New Mexico in January 2013 to train at Jackson's Mixed Martial Arts. On December 6, 2013, LaRosa was inducted in the New Jersey Martial Arts Hall of Fame.

== Early life ==
LaRosa grew up in her native Woodstown, New Jersey. She attended the now defunct St. James Catholic High School. A love of Jean-Claude Van Damme, Steven Seagal and Chuck Norris action films inspired her to enroll in judo. Years later, she moved into mixed martial arts training and trained with Royce Gracie. Her first venture into martial arts was through shotokan when she was 17. LaRosa was active in field hockey, basketball, and softball. Her favorite sport outside of MMA is field hockey, which she played for 12 years after starting in the 5th grade. She earned a field hockey scholarship to attend Catawba College between 1996 and 2000. LaRosa graduated with a degree in physical education. While in college, LaRosa started training in judo and jiu jitsu. Her membership in the college's judo club led to her competing in tournaments.

== Mixed martial arts career ==
=== Early career ===
LaRosa's first MMA fight was an April 2002 bantamweight bout against Shelby Walker in HOOKnSHOOT. She used her judo skills to get Walker to the ground, get the full mount and landed punches that led Walker to tap the canvas with her right hand at almost three minutes in the fight. LaRosa's next opponent was Angela Wilson on another HOOKnSHOOT card. LaRosa won when she hurt Wilson with a right knee, obtained full mount on the ground and unleashed punches, which resulted in a TKO win at 4:59 in round 1. At a Shooto Americas event, LaRosa submitted Ginele Marquez by armbar.

LaRosa's first loss came in May 2003 at the hands of Jennifer Howe, who was then considered to be the top female fighter in MMA. With weeks notice LaRosa replaced Howe's original opponent and competed for the vacant HooknShoot flyweight title. She was defeated by TKO after 2 minutes in the first round. She took a year off from MMA competition and returned to face and defeat Linda Langerak. LaRosa faced Alisa Cantwell at XFO 4 on December 3, 2004. She won the fight by armbar submission. It was her quickest victory, despite her illness on the plane en route to the Lakemoor location of the bout.

=== International career ===
She faced Hitomi Akano at MFC: USA vs. Russia 3 on June 3, 2006, and won the fight by unanimous decision.

LaRosa signed with BodogFight and debut against then #2 ranked Amanda Buckner in a highly touted 3 round battle in Costa Rica. She submitted Buckner by rear-naked choke with 29 seconds remaining in the bout. At BodogFight: USA vs. Russia on December 2, 2006 in Vancouver, LaRosa joined Team USA to fight her counterpart, Julia Berezikova, a member of Fedor Emelianenko's Russian Red Devil team. LaRosa won the fight by armbar submission in the second round. On another card in Costa Rica, LaRosa earned a dominant technical knockout win over Shayna Baszler. LaRosa was next set to face Laura D'Auguste in a championship bout, but an ankle injury forced D'Auguste off the card and she was replaced by Kelly Kobold. LaRosa met Kobold at BodogFight: Alvarez vs. Lee on July 14, 2007 for the BodogFight 135-pound women's championship. She won the fight via armbar submission in the fourth round.

LaRosa was in talks to join the International Fight League and YAMMA until those promotions closed in 2008 because of financial losses. Her next bout was uncertain until August 2008, when she signed with the American Fight League (AFL). The upstart AFL had also acquired Bobby Lashley, Mike Van Arsdale, Julie Kedzie and Roxanne Modafferi. Her contract with the AFL was a lucrative one for a duration of 18 months, which would have made her the highest paid female fighter in MMA. Her signing was officially announced at an AFL event on May 30, 2008 with plans to have her fight on the promotion's first pay per view card that fall. A bad economic climate was cited as the reason the pay per view did not happen. A rematch with Roxanne Modafferi was shifted by the AFL to Ironheart Crown promotion, under its Affiliate Promoter program. The bout was cancelled due to a shortage of AFL funding. LaRosa never competed in the AFL as a result of bad economic conditions. LaRosa returned to MMA competition after a 14-month absence to face Alexis Davis at Extreme Challenge: The War at the Shore on January 23, 2009. LaRosa survived a triangle choke at the conclusion of the second round and won by TKO when the doctor stopped the fight late in round three due to a worsened cut above Davis' eye. MMARising.com awarded the bout "Fight of the Year" and named LaRosa "Super Flyweight of the Year".

LaRosa rematched Roxanne Modafferi at Moosin: God of Martial Arts on May 21, 2010. She was defeated by split decision, marking her first loss in seven years.

LaRosa faced Takayo Hashi at DaMMAge Fight League 1 on November 24, 2010 in Atlantic City, New Jersey. She defeated Hashi by Unanimous Decision after five rounds to become the first DaMMAge Fight League Women's 125 lbs Champion. LaRosa's original opponent for the fight was Aisling Daly, who could not get approval from Bellator Fighting Championships to compete.

=== Independent promotions ===
During LaRosa's time in BodogFight, a bout with Carina Damm, who was also with the promotion, was considered but never happened. Years later, LaRosa went on to face Damm at Shark Fights 14 on March 11, 2011, in Lubbock, Texas. The bout was made with two weeks' notice after a co-main event match between Houston Alexander and James Irvin was cancelled. LaRosa won the fight via submission from a reverse heel hook early in the second round. The match had fulfilled the first of 3 bouts LaRosa had with Shark Fights.

In 2012, LaRosa signed a non-exclusive three-fight contract with Resurrection Fighting Alliance (RFA). LaRosa fought Kelly Warren at Resurrection Fighting Alliance 2 on March 30, 2012. Warren replaced Angela Magaña, who was injured in a car accident. Prior to the bout, LaRosa had spent her second-longest time outside of MMA competition by not fighting for 12 months. She defeated Warren by submission due to an armbar with one second remaining in the fight.

The bout with Warren was a catchweight, as LaRosa and Warren exceeded the flyweight limit by four and three pounds, respectively. It was the first time in LaRosa's career that she had missed weight, and LaRosa partly blamed the issue on a malfunctioning sauna which caused nine others to miss their contracted weight on the same card, including Elaina Maxwell and Ashley Sanchez, who were overweight for their featherweight fight.

=== Invicta FC and Pancrase ===
LaRosa faced Vanessa Porto at Invicta FC 3: Penne vs Sugiyama on October 6, 2012. Porto avoided LaRosa's takedown attempts, outstruck her in the stand up, and landed noticeably bruising kicks to LaRosa's left leg. LaRosa was defeated via unanimous decision (30-27 on all scorecards).

On September 29, 2013, LaRosa faced Rin Nakai in a non-title bout at Pancrase 252: 20th Anniversary in Yokohama, Japan. She was defeated by majority decision.

On September 6, 2014, LaRosa faced Roxanne Modafferi for the third time at Invicta FC 8. She lost the fight via unanimous decision.

=== The Ultimate Fighter ===
In August 2013, it was announced that LaRosa was one of the fighters selected to be on The Ultimate Fighter: Team Rousey vs. Team Tate. LaRosa faced Sarah Moras in the elimination round to get into the TUF house. In one of the show's bigger upsets, Moras defeated LaRosa via decision, thereby eliminating her from the show.

== Grappling and Jiu-Jitsu ==
LaRosa has partook in numerous grappling/jiu-jitsu competitions with and without a gi prior to and during her MMA career. She has competed in different regional competitions for NAGA Grappling World Championships. In 2000, she became the National Champion in the Women's Jiu Jitsu and Women's Kumite division of the United States Sport Jiu Jitsu Association. The next year she placed 2nd in the Women's Advanced divisions for NAGA - Battle at the Beach, and first in the same division for Gi and No Gi at Music City Grappling Championship. She became Women's Champion at Submission Fighting Open 7. She competed at Southern Open Submission Championships, placing 1st in the Women's Advanced (No Gi), 2nd in the Men's (Gi), and 3rd in Men's (No Gi) divisions. LaRosa was named the Southern Open Submission Championships' MVP of Tournament.

LaRosa won first place in the (Gi) and (No Gi) Women's Advanced Philadelphia Freedom Open Jiujitsu Tourney in 2002. She also was first in the Men's (Gi) Philadelphia Freedom Open Jiujitsu Tourney. She won NAGA - Georgia's Women's (Gi) competition, and was second in the 2nd Men's (No Gi) portion. She won Grappler's Quest - Copa Alantica Women's Advanced competition, and repeated as first-place winner in Women's Advanced (Gi) for Music City Grappling Championship. She was first in NAGA -Florida's Women's Advanced (No Gi), and 3rd in NAGA -Florida's Men's Intermediate (No Gi). At NAGA Championships, she was first in both the Gi and no Gi Women's Advanced competitions. In 2003, she was first in the Women's Advanced (Gi) division of the Dale Earnhardt Jr. Classic, and first in both the Gi and non-Gi portions of NAGA - World Championships Women's Advanced divisions. At NAGA - Miami, she was 1st in Women's Advanced (no Gi), and 2nd in the Men's Intermediate (No Gi).

LaRosa competed in the first women's divisions at the ADCC World Championships on May 27 and 28, 2005. She won a silver medal in the absolute division.

In August 2022, LaRosa earned the rank of Brown Belt from Combatives University. She was presented the rank by Combatives University founder, Matt Larsen, and the Combatives Black Belt Guild. LaRosa also won the 135-lbs Combat Jiu-Jitsu title while competing in Carolina Combat League.

== Personal life ==
Tara's parents are Carmen and Charlene LaRosa. She has a sister named Tiffany. Carmen and Charlene own and operate La Rosa Greenhouses, which they opened in Woodstown, New Jersey in 1979. Her family was initially against Tara being a professional fighter. They later attended some of her fights in New Jersey and supported her decision. Tara attributes her persistence to observing her father. Carmen had recovered from a financial setback with the family farm – bankruptcy – in the 1980s. Over several years, Carmen remained committed and repaid his debts. It motivated Tara and translated over in her desire for competition: "For me, fighting isn't about fighting – it is about competing. It's about testing myself and not giving up. I compete in everything I do. It's who I am."

To support herself outside of competition, LaRosa has worked in construction, as a personal assistant, bouncer, bartender, landscaper, and a medical marijuana delivery driver.

LaRosa's boyfriend, SFC Adrian Marcos Elizalde, was killed on August 23, 2007 when an improvised explosive device hit his truck in Al Aziziyah, Iraq. LaRosa was in Vancouver doing promotional work for BodogFight when she heard the news of Elizalde's death. They met as training partners while LaRosa was an instructor in modern army combat in Fayetteville, North Carolina. Elizalde, age 30, worked as an engineer in the U.S. Special Forces.

LaRosa endured a life-threatening experience in December 2010 during a second attempt to complete a 70-mile hike on Western Pennsylvania's Laurel Highlands trail. Her first try that September had been incomplete due to a knee injury. Unbeknownst to her during her second attempt, the challenge would be compounded by a drop in temperature caused by the recent appearance of a weather front from Lake Erie. The ensuing heavy winds prevented her from maintaining a fire to keep warm after desperately finding a temporary shelter. The lack of cell phone reception led her to contact her mother, Charlene, through text messaging. Her mother called the authorities and LaRosa's location was found by GPS tracking of her phone. LaRosa was rescued by two rangers from Somerset County, Pennsylvania and later treated for hypothermia.

In January 2018, LaRosa participated in a sparring match against a comedian with no martial arts training named Kristopher Zylinski. The experiment was arranged by the Facebook page McDojoLife in response to Zylinski's messages in the comment section of an MMA article. The comment, which began "99% of women are too weak and lack the reflexes to do enough damage to stop 99% of men", was followed by a request to have Zylinski compete against a female MMA fighter, to which he replied "still 80/20 me." Anna Dempster and Sarah Patterson initially responded to the challenge but Tara LaRosa stepped in to replace them after each of them suffered an eye injury. On January 6, one hour before the fight, LaRosa and Zylinski were told by police that the event had been deemed illegal by Florida's State Athletics Commission. It was held later on and uploaded on January 22. It ended with Zylinski tapping out and stating that LaRosa won the fight due to better conditioning.

LaRosa began attending right-wing events following her retirement in 2015. In November 2018, LaRosa spoke at a HimToo rally in Portland, organized by a member of the far-right group Patriot Prayer. LaRosa's presence at right wing events in Portland continued into 2019. Shortly after Veteran's Day, she was noted for subduing a counter-protester while members of the Proud Boys filmed her and waited for police to arrive. The woman being restrained was heard saying "I can't breathe", while LaRosa reported that she was bitten during the incident. Police recommended no arrests to either party but noted that "there are conflicting versions of the events". Since then LaRosa has become a close ally to the far-right group the Proud Boys as she supports their beliefs. LaRosa has also advanced conspiracy theories about the COVID-19 pandemic and the 2020 U.S. presidential election, and published a list of people who had signed a petition against Donald Trump which she falsely claimed was a list of anti-fascist activists. On Twitter she has also written that "a civil war is coming" and recommended her followers purchase weapons. LaRosa has been criticized, however, by other supporters of the Proud Boys who oppose women's involvement in the group.

== Mixed martial arts record ==
Professional record breakdown
27 matches	22 wins	5 losses
By knockout	3	1
By submission	12	0
By decision	7	4

Res.	Record	Opponent	Method	Event	Date	Round	Time	Location	Notes
Win	22–5	Katie Howard	Decision (unanimous)	Fusion Fight League: Epic Evolution	May 15, 2015	3	5:00	Billings, Montana, United States	
Loss	21–5	Roxanne Modafferi	Decision (unanimous)	Invicta FC 8: Waterson vs. Tamada	September 6, 2014	3	5:00	Kansas City, Missouri, United States	
Loss	21–4	Rin Nakai	Decision (majority)	Pancrase 252: 20th Anniversary	September 29, 2013	3	5:00	Yokohama, Kanagawa Prefecture, Japan	Non-title bantamweight bout.
Loss	21–3	Vanessa Porto	Decision (unanimous)	Invicta FC 3: Penne vs. Sugiyama	October 6, 2012	3	5:00	Kansas City, Kansas, United States	Catchweight bout; LaRosa missed weight.
Win	21–2	Kelly Warren	Submission (armbar)	RFA 2: Yvel vs. Alexander	March 30, 2012	3	4:59	Kearney, Nebraska, United States	Catchweight bout; both fighters missed weight.
Win	20–2	Carina Damm	Submission (inverted heel hook)	Shark Fights 14: Horwich vs. Villefort	March 11, 2011	2	0:28	Lubbock, Texas, United States	
Win	19–2	Takayo Hashi	Decision (unanimous)	DaMMAge Fight League: The Big Bang	November 24, 2010	5	5:00	Atlantic City, New Jersey, United States	Became first DaMMAge Fight League Women's 125 lbs Champion.
Loss	18–2	Roxanne Modafferi	Decision (split)	Moosin: God of Martial Arts	May 21, 2010	3	5:00	Worcester, Massachusetts, United States	Fight was at 130 lbs. Catchweight.
Win	18–1	Valerie Coolbaugh	Submission (rear-naked choke)	Extreme Force: "Locked In The Cage 1"	November 20, 2009	1	3:58	Philadelphia, Pennsylvania, United States	Won the Locked in the Cage Women's Flyweight Championship.
Win	17–1	Sally Krumdiack	Submission (kimura)	Extreme Challenge: "Mayhem At The Marina"	March 28, 2009	3	1:45	Atlantic City, New Jersey, United States	
Win	16–1	Alexis Davis	TKO (doctor stoppage)	Extreme Challenge: "The War at the Shore"	January 23, 2009	3	4:23	Atlantic City, New Jersey, United States	
Win	15–1	Cody Welchlin	Submission (triangle armbar)	HOOKnSHOOT: BodogFight 2007 Women's Grand Prix	November 24, 2007	2	2:57	Evansville, Indiana, United States	Non-title bout.
Win	14–1	Kelly Kobold	Submission (armbar)	BodogFight: Alvarez vs. Lee	July 14, 2007	4	2:50	Trenton, New Jersey, United States	Won BodogFight Women's Bantamweight Championship.
Win	13–1	Shayna Baszler	TKO (punches)	BodogFight: Costa Rica	February 18, 2007	2	3:15	Costa Rica	
Win	12–1	Julia Berezikova	Submission (armbar)	BodogFight: USA vs. Russia	December 2, 2006	2	1:28	Vancouver, British Columbia, Canada	
Win	11–1	Amanda Buckner	Submission (rear-naked choke)	BodogFight: To The Brink Of War	August 22, 2006	3	4:31	Costa Rica	
Win	10–1	Julie Kedzie	Decision (unanimous)	Ultimate Cage Wars	July 8, 2006	3	5:00	Chelan, Washington, United States	Won UCW Women's Bantamweight Championship.
Win	9–1	Hitomi Akano	Decision (unanimous)	Mix Fight Championship: USA vs. Russia 3	June 3, 2006	3	5:00	Atlantic City, New Jersey, United States	
Win	8–1	Roxanne Modafferi	Decision (unanimous)	Mix Fight Championship: Boardwalk Blitz	March 4, 2006	3	5:00	Atlantic City, New Jersey, United States	
Win	7–1	Kumiko Maekawa	Decision (unanimous)	Smackgirl: Lightweight Anniversary	November 29, 2005	2	5:00	Tokyo, Japan	
Win	6–1	Megumi Yabushita	Decision (majority)	G-Shooto: G-Shooto 02	March 12, 2005	2	5:00	Tokyo, Japan	
Win	5–1	Alisa Cantwell	Submission (armbar)	Xtreme Fighting Organization 4	December 3, 2004	1	2:45	McHenry, Illinois, United States	
Win	4–1	Linda Langerak	Submission (armbar)	HOOKnSHOOT: Evolution	November 6, 2004	2	2:29	Evansville, Indiana, United States	
Loss	3–1	Jennifer Howe	TKO (punches)	HOOKnSHOOT: Absolute Fighting Championships 3	May 24, 2003	1	2:18	Fort Lauderdale, Florida, United States	
Win	3–0	Ginele Marquez	Submission (armbar)	Tennessee Shooto: Judgment	March 22, 2003	1	4:10	Clarksville, Tennessee, United States	
Win	2–0	Angela Wilson	TKO (punches)	HOOKnSHOOT: New Wind	September 7, 2002	1	4:51	Evansville, Indiana, United States	
Win	1–0	Shelby Walker	Submission (punches)	HOOKnSHOOT: Revolution	April 13, 2002	1	2:43	Evansville, Indiana, United States	

== Championships and accomplishments ==
- DaMMAge Fight League Women's Super Flyweight Champion - 2010
- Locked in the Cage Women's Flyweight Champion - 2009
- BodogFight Women's Bantamweight Champion - 2007
- UCW Women's Bantamweight Champion - 2006
- Carolina Combat League Bantamweight Combat Jiu-Jitsu Champion - 2022
- Women's MMA Awards
  - 2009 Super Flyweight of the Year
  - 2009 Fight of the Year vs. Alexis Davis
  - 2010 Fight of the Year vs. Roxanne Modafferi
- Fight Matrix
  - 2006 Female Fighter of the Year
  - 2007 Female Fighter of the Year
  - 2009 Female Fighter of the Year

== See also ==
- List of female mixed martial artists
