= Shelby Walker =

American MMA fighter and boxer

- Born: Shelby Rogers; February 27, 1975; Kingsville, Texas, United States
- Died: September 24, 2006 (aged 31); Fort Lauderdale, Florida, US
- Other names: Shelby Girl
- Nationality: American
- Height: 5 ft 3 in (1.60 m)
- Weight: 125 lb (57 kg; 8.9 st)
- Division: Flyweight (MMA); Featherweight (Boxing)
- Reach: 64 in (160 cm)
- Trainer: Howard Davis Jr.

Professional boxing record
- Total: 14
- Wins: 7
- By knockout: 6
- Losses: 6
- Draws: 1

Mixed martial arts record
- Total: 5
- Wins: 2
- By knockout: 1
- By decision: 1
- Losses: 3
- By submission: 3

Other information
- Website: http://www.shelbywalker.com/
- Boxing record from BoxRec
- Mixed martial arts record from Sherdog

Shelby Walker (27 February 1975 – 24 September 2006) was an American professional boxer and mixed martial artist. Walker, also known as Shelby Girl, was born as Shelby Rogers.

== Combat career ==
After five years in active duty and in the reserve of the US Army, Walker began her career as a mixed martial artist. Of her six MMA bouts, she won three and lost three.

In 2002, Walker became a professional boxer. In her boxing career, she completed 14 bouts. She won seven (six of them by K.O.), lost six and reached a draw.

Shelby Walker was originally supposed to fight Erica Montoya at UFC 51, if it occurred it would have been the first female MMA bout in the UFC. The fight never materialised, "Big Dog" Benny Henderson Jr. asked Shelby Walker, "It has been rumored that you may fight Erika Montoya at UFC 51, is there any truth to those rumors?" Walker replied, "Yeah there is truth to those rumors, it has been talked about a lot and when I asked Dana White if he was going to put us on the show he said possibly, so that is where it stands right now. I haven’t heard anything more from this but my biggest dream would be to fight in the UFC."

== Professional boxing record ==
14 fights	7 wins	6 losses
By knockout	6	4
By decision	1	2
Draws	1	

No.	Result	Record	Opponent	Type	Round, time	Date	Location	Notes
14	Loss	7–6–1	Mia St. John	TKO	3	Apr 1, 2006	Palo Duro Creek Country Club, Nogales, Arizona, USA	
13	Loss	7–5–1	Jaime Clampitt	TKO	4	2005-08-26	Convention Center, Providence, Rhode Island, USA	International Women's Boxing Federation World lightweight title
12	Win	7–4–1	Maria Elena Anderson	TKO	6, 0:37	03/12/05	Marconi Automotive Museum, Tustin	
11	Loss	6–4–1	Emiko Raika	TKO	2	May 23, 2004	Kyoto, Japan	Women's International Boxing Association World featherweight title
10	Loss	6–3–1	Kristy Follmar	UD	8, 2:00	11/25/03	Pepsi Coliseum, Indianapolis	
9	Win	6–2–1	Renee Richardt	MD	4, 2:00	10/17/03	Radisson Hotel, Merrillville, Indiana	
8	Loss	5–2–1	Terri Blair	TKO	4, 1:48	06/14/03	Radisson Hotel, Merrillville, Indiana	
7	Win	5–1–1	Lanisha Hinson	KO	1, 1:05	06/06/03	Farm Bureau Building, Indianapolis	
6	Win	4–1–1	Patricia Silotta	TKO	3, 0:55	06/03/03	8 Second Saloon, Indianapolis	
5	Draw	3–1–1	Ninfa Herrera	PTS	4, 2:00	03/27/03	Memorial Coliseum, Corpus Christi	
4	Win	3–1	Amanda Lynch	TKO	2, 1:46	03/06/03	Farm Bureau Building, Indianapolis	
3	Loss	2–1	Julia Day	UD	4, 2:00	02/04/03	8 Second Saloon, Indianapolis	
2	Win	2–0	Diane Thompson	TKO	1, 0:50	12/03/02	8 Second Saloon, Indianapolis	
1	Win	1–0	Christmas Davis	TKO	2, 0:36	10/01/02	8 Second Saloon, Indianapolis	

== Mixed martial arts record ==
Professional record breakdown
5 matches	2 wins	3 losses
By knockout	1	0
By submission	0	3
By decision	1	0

Res.	Record	Opponent	Method	Event	Date	Round	Time	Location	Notes
Loss	2–3	Adrienna Jenkins	Submission (rear-naked choke)	HOOKnSHOOT Evolution 2	November 6, 2004	1	1:27	Evansville, Indiana, United States	
Win	2–2	Beth Westover	Decision (unanimous)	Absolute Fighting Championships 4	July 19, 2003	2	5:00	Fort Lauderdale, Florida, United States	
Win	1–2	Angela Wilson	TKO (punches)	USMMA 3: Ring of Fury	May 3, 2003	1	0:05	Boston, Massachusetts, United States	
Loss	0–2	Tara LaRosa	Submission (punches)	HOOKnSHOOT Revolution	April 13, 2002	1	2:43	Evansville, Indiana, United States	
Loss	0–1	Judy Neff	Submission (armbar)	HOOKnSHOOT Kings 1	November 17, 2001	1	0:40	Evansville, Indiana, United States	
