= Tonya Evinger =

American mixed martial artist (born 1981)

- Born: June 4, 1981 (age 45); Moses Lake, Washington, U.S.
- Other names: Triple Threat
- Height: 5 ft 7 in (1.70 m)
- Weight: 135 lb (61 kg; 9 st 9 lb)
- Division: Bantamweight; Featherweight
- Reach: 70 in (178 cm)
- Fighting out of: Houston, Texas, U.S.
- Team: Gracie Barra Champions; 4 oz Fight Club
- Years active: 2006–present

Mixed martial arts record
- Total: 28
- Wins: 19
- By knockout: 8
- By submission: 7
- By decision: 4
- Losses: 8
- By knockout: 2
- By submission: 4
- By decision: 2
- No contests: 1

Other information
- Mixed martial arts record from Sherdog

Tonya Evinger (born June 4, 1981) is an American mixed martial artist. She is currently signed with Global Fight League (GFL). A professional since 2006, Evinger has previously competed for the Ultimate Fighting Championship (UFC), EliteXC, Raging Wolf and Invicta Fighting Championships, and was the Invicta Bantamweight Champion.

== Early life ==
Evinger played football and wrestled while at Odessa High School in Odessa, Missouri. She went on to wrestle and earn her degree at Missouri Valley College in Marshall, Missouri. Evinger's younger twin brothers, Chris and Owen Evinger, are also professional mixed martial arts fighters.

== Mixed martial arts career ==
=== Early career ===
Evinger faced Jennifer Tate at IFC: Warriors Challenge 21 on June 3, 2006, and lost via triangle choke in the second round. The fight was the first women's bout ever sanctioned by the California State Athletic Commission.

She faced Brittany Pullen at FFF 1: Asian Invasion on February 17, 2007. She won the fight via a 16-second knockout in the first round.

Evinger faced Shonie Plagman at X-1: Extreme Fighting 2 on March 17, 2007. She won the fight by knockout 10 seconds into the second round.

She faced Ginele Marquez at Tuff-N-Uff 2 on April 14, 2007. She won the fight by rear naked choke submission in the third round.

Evinger faced Vanessa Porto at FFF 2: Girls Night Out on July 14, 2007. She lost the fight by armbar submission in the first round.

=== EliteXC ===
Evinger debuted for Elite XC against Gina Carano at EliteXC: Uprising on September 15, 2007. She lost the fight by rear-naked choke submission in the first round.

She faced Julie Kedzie at ShoXC: Elite Challenger Series on January 25, 2007. She won the fight by rear-naked choke submission in the first round.

=== Post-EliteXC ===
Evinger faced Alexis Davis at Raging Wolf 7: Mayhem In The Mist 3 on May 8, 2010, for the Raging Wolf Women's Flyweight Championship. She lost the fight by rear-naked choke submission in the third round.

Evinger faced Adrienna Jenkins in a number one contender's bout at Raging Wolf 8: Cage Supremacy on July 17, 2010. She won the fight by TKO in the second round.

On November 6, 2010, Evinger rematched Alexis Davis at Raging Wolf 10. She was defeated by submission due to a rear-naked choke in the first round.

Evinger faced Sara McMann at Titan Fighting Championships 19 on July 29, 2011, in Kansas City, Kansas. The fight served as the co-main event. Evinger was defeated by unanimous decision.

On September 23, 2011, Evinger stepped in on short notice to face Anita Rodriguez at XFL: Rumble on the River 5 in Tulsa, Oklahoma. She defeated Rodriguez by submission due to a rear-naked choke in round one.

Evinger defeated Lacie Jackson by knockout in the first round at Fight Me MMA on April 13, 2012.

On November 10, 2012, Evinger made her flyweight debut against Carina Damm at Fight Hard MMA. She defeated Damm by split decision.

=== The Ultimate Fighter ===
In August 2013, it was announced that Evinger was one of the fighters selected to be on The Ultimate Fighter: Team Rousey vs. Team Tate. In the elimination fight to get into the TUF house, Evinger faced Raquel Pennington and lost via guillotine choke submission in the second round.

=== Invicta Fighting Championships ===
On December 7, 2013, Evinger faced Sarah D'Alelio at Invicta Fighting Championships 7. She won the fight via unanimous decision.

After switching camps to Houston, Texas she joined team Gracie Barra Champions and 4 oz Fight Club, training her Boxing and Kickboxing with Aaron Pena (GBC) and MMA with Jeremy Mahon (4 oz). Evinger next fought Ediane Gomes at Invicta Fighting Championships 8 on September 6, 2014. She won the fight via first round submission.

Evinger next fought Cindy Dandois at Invicta Fighting Championships 10 on December 5, 2014. She won the fight via second round submission, making her the front runner to fight for the vacant Invicta FC bantamweight title.

Evinger next fought Irene Aldana for the vacant Invicta FC bantamweight title at Invicta Fighting Championships 13 on July 9, 2015. She dominated the fight from bell to bell, almost finishing the fight early with an arm bar. Evinger would go on to stop Aldana in the 4th round via TKO (punches), claiming the Invicta FC bantamweight title.

Evinger next fought undefeated prospect, Pannie Kianzad. This was originally set as a title defense but both Evinger and Kianzad were unable to make weight, both being fined a percentage of their purse and was changed to a five-round non-title fight. Evinger ended up dispatching Kianzad in the 2nd round by TKO due to punches.

Evinger next fought Colleen Schneider at Invicta Fighting Championships 17 on May 7, 2016. Evinger successfully defended her bantamweight title by unanimous decision. Following the fight, Evinger celebrated her victory by kissing interviewer Laura Sanko on the lips.

Evinger would lose her bantamweight championship in an upset defeat to Russian newcomer Yana Kunitskaya by armbar submission in the first round on November 18, 2016. The loss was controversial because the referee told her to move from a legal position which may have led directly to the submission. Evinger appealed her loss and on December 1, 2016, the loss was changed to a no contest, so Evinger retained her title.

Evinger faced Kunitskaya in a rematch in the main event of Invicta FC 22 on March 25, 2017. She won the fight by submission in the second round to retain her title.

=== Ultimate Fighting Championship ===
On June 27, 2017, it was announced that Evinger had signed with the UFC and was set to face Cris Cyborg for the vacant UFC Women's Featherweight Championship at UFC 214. She lost the fight by TKO in the third round.

Evinger was scheduled to face Marion Reneau at UFC Fight Night: Cowboy vs. Medeiros in Austin, Texas, Texas on February 18, 2018. However, on January 9, 2018, she was forced to pull out fight, citing injury.

Evinger was scheduled to face Ketlen Vieira on September 22, 2018, at UFC Fight Night 137. However, on August 7, 2018, Vieira pulled out due to a knee injury. In turn, Evinger was pulled from the card and scheduled to face Aspen Ladd two weeks later at UFC 229. She lost the fight via TKO in the first round.

Evinger faced Lina Länsberg on June 1, 2019, at UFC Fight Night 153. She lost the fight by unanimous decision and was subsequently released from the promotion.

=== Global Fight League ===
On December 11, 2024, it was announced that Evinger had signed with Global Fight League. However, in April 2025, it was reported that all GFL events were cancelled indefinitely.

== Championships and accomplishments ==
- Invicta Fighting Championships
  - Invicta FC Bantamweight Champion (One time)
    - Two successful title defenses vs. Colleen Schneider and Yana Kunitskaya
  - Performance of the Night (Two times) vs. Ediane Gomes and Pannie Kianzad

== Mixed martial arts record ==
Professional record breakdown
28 matches	19 wins	8 losses
By knockout	8	2
By submission	7	4
By decision	4	2
No contests	1	

Res.	Record	Opponent	Method	Event	Date	Round	Time	Location	Notes
Loss	19–8 (1)	Lina Länsberg	Decision (unanimous)	UFC Fight Night: Gustafsson vs. Smith	June 1, 2019	3	5:00	Stockholm, Sweden	
Loss	19–7 (1)	Aspen Ladd	TKO (punches)	UFC 229	October 6, 2018	1	3:26	Las Vegas, Nevada, United States	Return to Bantamweight.
Loss	19–6 (1)	Cris Cyborg	TKO (knees)	UFC 214	July 29, 2017	3	1:56	Anaheim, California, United States	For the vacant UFC Women's Featherweight Championship.
Win	19–5 (1)	Yana Kunitskaya	Submission (rear-naked choke)	Invicta FC 22: Evinger vs. Kunitskaya II	March 25, 2017	2	4:32	Kansas City, Missouri, United States	Defended the Invicta FC Bantamweight Championship.
NC	18–5 (1)	Yana Kunitskaya	NC (overturned)	Invicta FC 20: Evinger vs. Kunitskaya	November 18, 2016	1	1:59	Kansas City, Missouri, United States	Retained the Invicta FC Bantamweight Championship. Originally a submission (armbar) win for Kunitskaya; overturned after Evinger appealed the loss due to a controversial referee call. Evinger subsequently reinstated as champion.
Win	18–5	Colleen Schneider	Decision (unanimous)	Invicta FC 17: Evinger vs. Schneider	May 7, 2016	5	5:00	Costa Mesa, California, United States	Defended the Invicta FC Bantamweight Championship.
Win	17–5	Pannie Kianzad	TKO (punches)	Invicta FC 14: Evinger vs. Kianzad	September 12, 2015	2	3:34	Kansas City, Missouri, United States	Non-title bout; Kianzad missed weight (136.7 lbs). Performance of the Night.
Win	16–5	Irene Aldana	TKO (punches)	Invicta FC 13: Cyborg vs. Van Duin	July 9, 2015	4	4:38	Las Vegas, Nevada, United States	Won the vacant Invicta FC Bantamweight Championship.
Win	15–5	Cindy Dandois	Submission (armbar)	Invicta FC 10: Waterson vs. Tiburcio	December 5, 2014	2	1:23	Houston, Texas, United States	
Win	14–5	Ediane Gomes	Submission (armbar)	Invicta FC 8: Waterson vs. Tamada	September 6, 2014	1	3:31	Kansas City, Missouri, United States	Performance of the Night.
Win	13–5	Sarah D'Alelio	Decision (unanimous)	Invicta FC 7: Honchak vs. Smith	December 7, 2013	3	5:00	Kansas City, Missouri, United States	Return to Bantamweight.
Win	12–5	Carina Damm	Decision (split)	Fight Hard MMA	November 10, 2012	3	5:00	St. Charles, Missouri, United States	Flyweight debut.
Win	11–5	Lacie Jackson	KO (punch)	Fight Me MMA	April 13, 2012	1	1:47	St. Charles, Missouri, United States	
Win	10–5	Anita Rodriguez	Submission (rear-naked choke)	XFL: Rumble on the River 5	September 23, 2011	1	1:57	Tulsa, Oklahoma, United States	
Loss	9–5	Sara McMann	Decision (unanimous)	Titan FC 19	July 29, 2011	3	5:00	Kansas City, Kansas, United States	Catchweight (140 lbs) bout.
Loss	9–4	Alexis Davis	Submission (rear-naked choke)	RW 10: Mayhem in the Mist 5	October 6, 2010	1	1:25	Niagara Falls, New York, United States	For the Raging Wolf Women's Bantamweight Championship.
Win	9–3	Adrienna Jenkins	TKO (punches)	RW 8: Cage Supremacy	July 17, 2010	2	3:16	Salamanca, New York, United States	
Loss	8–3	Alexis Davis	Submission (rear-naked choke)	RW 7: Mayhem in the Mist 3	May 8, 2010	3	1:47	Niagara Falls, New York, United States	For the Raging Wolf Women's Bantamweight Championship.
Win	8–2	Sarah Schneider	Decision (unanimous)	True Fight Fans	June 6, 2008	3	5:00	Missouri, United States	
Win	7–2	Julie Kedzie	Submission (rear-naked choke)	ShoXC: Elite Challenger Series	January 25, 2008	1	1:43	Atlantic City, New Jersey, United States	Catchweight (140 lbs) bout.
Win	6–2	Katrine Alendal	Submission (armbar)	PFP: Ring of Fire	December 9, 2007	1	N/A	Manila, Philippines	
Loss	5–2	Gina Carano	Submission (rear-naked choke)	EliteXC: Uprising	September 15, 2007	1	2:53	Honolulu, Hawaii, United States	Catchweight (140 lbs) bout.
Loss	5–1	Vanessa Porto	Submission (armbar)	FFF 2: Girls Night Out	July 14, 2007	1	2:14	Compton, California, United States	
Win	5–0	Ginele Marquez	Submission (rear-naked choke)	Tuff-N-Uff 2	April 14, 2007	3	1:58	Las Vegas, Nevada, United States	
Win	4–0	Shonie Plagmann	KO (punch)	X-1: Extreme Fighting 2	March 17, 2007	2	0:10	Honolulu, Hawaii, United States	
Win	3–0	Angela Hayes	TKO (punches)	Kick Enterprises	March 10, 2007	1	1:02	Ft. Myers, Florida, United States	
Win	2–0	Brittany Pullen	KO (punch)	FFF 1: Asian Invasion	February 17, 2007	1	0:16	Los Angeles, California, United States	
win	1–0	Brittany Pullen	KO (punches)	IFC: Warriors Challenge 21	June 3, 2006	2	1:56	Tuolumne, California, United States	

Exhibition record breakdown		
1 match	0 wins	1 loss
By knockout	0	0
By submission	0	1
By decision	0	0

Res.	Record	Opponent	Method	Event	Date	Round	Time	Location	Notes
Loss	0–1	Raquel Pennington	Submission (guillotine choke)	The Ultimate Fighter: Team Rousey vs. Team Tate	September 4, 2013	2		Las Vegas, Nevada, United States	Preliminary bout.

== See also ==
- List of current GFL fighters
- List of female mixed martial artists

Awards and achievements
Preceded by Lauren Murphy	2nd Invicta FC Bantamweight Champion; July 9, 2015 – July 3, 2017	Succeeded by Yana Kunitskaya
