= 2009 in Palace Fighting Championship =

Information
- First date: January 22, 2009
- Last date: May 8, 2009

Events
- Total events: 4

Fights
- Total fights: 36

Chronology
2008 in PFC	2009 in Palace Fighting Championship

The year 2009 is the 3rd year in the history of Palace Fighting Championship, a mixed martial arts promotion based in the United States. In 2009 PFC held 4 events beginning with, PFC 12: High Stakes.

== Events list ==
No.	Event	Date	Venue	Location
19	PFC 13: Validation	May 8, 2009	Tachi Palace	Lemoore, California
18	PFC: Best of Both Worlds 2	April 23, 2009	Tachi Palace	Lemoore, California
17	PFC: Best of Both Worlds	February 6, 2009	Tachi Palace	Lemoore, California
16	PFC 12: High Stakes	January 22, 2009	Tachi Palace	Lemoore, California

== PFC 12: High Stakes ==
PFC 12: High Stakes was an event held on January 22, 2009 at the Tachi Palace in Lemoore, California, United States.

=== Results ===
Main Card
Weight class				Method	Round	Time	Notes
	Jeff Bedard	def.	Shawn Klarcyk	Submission (North-South Choke)	3	2:40
	Diego Saraiva	def.	Jorge Evangelista	Submission (Rear-Naked Choke)	2	2:39
	Lavar Johnson	def.	Dave Huckaba	TKO (Corner Stoppage)	1	3:00
	Brian Cobb	def.	Lance Wipf	Submission (Rear-Naked Choke)	2	1:17
	Tito Jones	def.	Justin Smitley	Decision (Split)	3	3:00
	Olaf Alfonso	def.	Jeremiah Metcalf	Submission (Armbar)	1	1:38
	Cyrille Diabate	def.	Lodune Sincaid	TKO (Doctor Stoppage)	2	1:15
	Billy Evangelista	def.	Harris Sarmiento	Decision (Unanimous)	3	3:00
	Evan Dunham	def.	Dustin Akbari	Submission (Rear-Naked Choke)	3	0:40
	John Gunderson	def.	Alexander Crispim	Decision (Split)	3	3:00
	Xavier Foupa-Pokam	def.	Kyacey Uscola	KO (Flying Knee to the Body)	1	2:06
	Phil Davis	def.	Josh Green	TKO (Punches)	1	1:49
	Michael McDonald	def.	Jason Georgianna	TKO (Punches)	1	2:38

== PFC: Best of Both Worlds ==
PFC: Best of Both Worlds was an event held on February 6, 2009 at the Tachi Palace in Lemoore, California, United States.

=== Results ===
Main Card
Weight class				Method	Round	Time	Notes
	Alexis Vila	def.	Ben Nguyen	KO (Punch)	2	0:34
	Ulysses Gomez	def.	David Suarez	Submission (Rear-Naked Choke)	1	1:45
	Erin Toughill	def.	Karen Williams	TKO (Punches)	1	2:06
	Brandon Cash	def.	Steve Gavin	TKO (Punches)	1	0:26
	Mike Hayes	def.	Rick Cheek	Submission (Punches)	2	1:01
	Chad Mendes	def.	Leland Gridley	TKO (Punches)	2	1:58
	Joe Morales	def.	Joey Cabezas	Decision (Split)	3	3:00

== PFC: Best of Both Worlds 2 ==
PFC: Best of Both Worlds 2 was an event held on April 23, 2009 at the Tachi Palace in Lemoore, California, United States.

=== Results ===
Main Card
Weight class				Method	Round	Time	Notes
	Chad Mendes	def.	Art Arciniega	Decision (Unanimous)	3	3:00
	Enoch Wilson	def.	Shawn Bias	Submission (Kneebar)	2	1:21
	Sergio Cortez	def.	Sergio Quinones	Decision (Split)	3	3:00
	Sarah Kaufman	def.	Sarah Schneider	TKO (Punches)	2	1:43
	Kengo Ura	def.	Doug Hunt	Submission (Rear-Naked Choke)	1	2:44

== PFC 13: Validation ==
PFC 13: Validation was an event held on May 8, 2009 at the Tachi Palace in Lemoore, California, United States.

=== Results ===
Main Card
Weight class				Method	Round	Time	Notes
	Doug Marshall	def.	Jaime Jara	Decision (Split)	3	3:00
	Kyle Pimental	def.	Olaf Alfonso	TKO (Doctor Stoppage)	3	2:48
	Eddie Yagin	def.	Casey Olson	Submission (Guillotine Choke)	1	1:16
	Carlo Prater	def.	Dominique Robinson	Decision (Unanimous)	5	3:00
	Cole Escovedo	def.	Michael McDonald	TKO (Punches)	2	2:25
	Pat Runez	def.	Anthony Perales	Submission (Rear-Naked Choke)	2	2:28
	Bryan Travers	def.	John Gunderson	Decision (Unanimous)	3	3:00
	Erin Toughill	def.	Emily Thompson	Decision (Unanimous)	3	3:00
	Gabe Ruediger	def.	Darren Crisp	Submission (Guillotine Choke)	1	1:03
	Scott McAfee	def.	Bill Theofanopoulos	KO (Punch)	2	0:43
	John Reedy	def.	Marcelo Giudici	Decision (Unanimous)	3	3:00

== See also ==
- Palace Fighting Championship
