= Dwayne Ledford =

American football player and coach (born 1976)

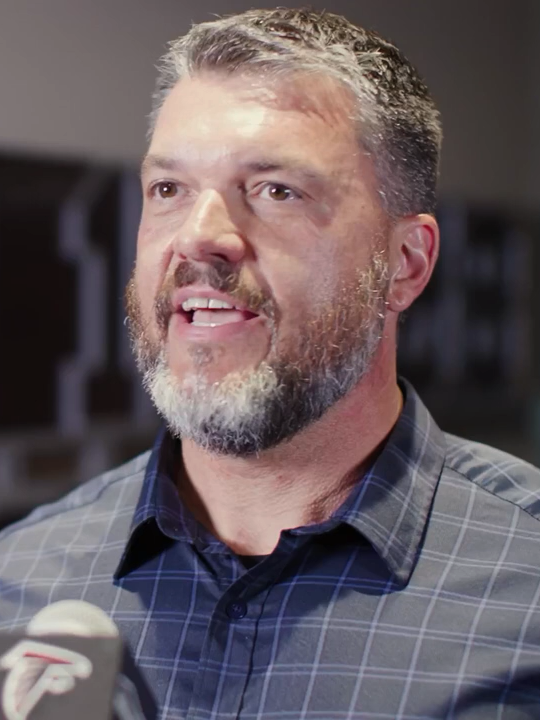
- Ledford in 2023

Baltimore Ravens
- Title: Offensive line coach & run game coordinator

Personal information
- Born: November 2, 1976 (age 50); Morganton, North Carolina, U.S.
- Listed height: 6 ft 4 in (1.93 m)
- Listed weight: 300 lb (136 kg)

Career information
- Position: Center (No. 76, 67)
- High school: McDowell (Marion, North Carolina)
- College: East Carolina (1995–1998)
- NFL draft: 1999: undrafted

Career history

Playing
- San Francisco 49ers (1999–2000); Jacksonville Jaguars (2000); Carolina Panthers (2001); Philadelphia Eagles (2002)*; San Francisco 49ers (2003–2004); New Orleans Saints (2005)*; Cleveland Browns (2005); New Orleans Saints (2006)*
- * Offseason or practice squad member only

Coaching
- North Carolina (2005) Assistant strength & conditioning coach; Frankfurt Galaxy (2006–2007); Intern – Offensive line (2006); Tight ends & offensive tackles coach (2007); Sanderson HS (NC) (2007) Offensive line coach; East Carolina (2008–2009) Graduate assistant; Tennessee State (2010) Offensive line coach; Gardner–Webb (2011) Offensive line coach; Appalachian State (2012–2015); Offensive line coach (2012); Co-offensive coordinator & offensive line coach (2013–2015); NC State (2016–2018) Offensive line coach; Louisville (2019–2020) Offensive coordinator & offensive line coach; Atlanta Falcons (2021–2025); Offensive line coach (2021–2023); Offensive line coach & run game coordinator (2024–2025); Baltimore Ravens (2026–present) Offensive line coach & run game coordinator

Career NFL statistics
- Games played: 9
- Games started: 1
- Stats at Pro Football Reference

Billy Dwayne Ledford (born November 2, 1976) is an American football coach and former player who is the offensive line coach and run game coordinator for the Baltimore Ravens of the National Football League (NFL). He previously served as the offensive line coach for the Atlanta Falcons from 2021 to 2025. He played professionally as a center in the NFL for the San Francisco 49ers (1999–2000, 2003–2004), Jacksonville Jaguars (2000), Carolina Panthers (2001), and Cleveland Browns (2005). Ledford played college football at East Carolina University, where he was drafted by the 49ers in 1999.

Ledford is a graduate of McDowell High School in Marion, North Carolina, where he was a two-time All-Conference selection and led the team in quarterback sacks three straight years.

== Coaching career ==
On January 28, 2026, Ledford was hired to serve as the offensive line coach for the Baltimore Ravens under new head coach Jesse Minter.
