= Steven Blackford =

American wrestler

Steven Allen Blackford (August 1, 1976 – September 3, 2004) was a three-time NCAA All-American and two-time Pac-10 Champion wrestler for Arizona State University. He was a 1996 graduate of WDM Dowling and was an individual 2x state champion.

Riding in a Jeep driven by his girlfriend, 2004 Summer Olympics silver medalist Sara McMann, Blackford, was ejected from the car when it ran off the road and rolled over. He died at the scene. McMann was hospitalized, and later charged with careless driving. Blackford had been attending the Columbus Law School at Catholic University at the time of his death.
