= Sarah Schneider (fighter) =

American mixed martial artist

- Born: August 30, 1980 (age 46); Raytown, Missouri, United States
- Nationality: American
- Height: 5 ft 3 in (1.60 m)
- Weight: 114 lb (52 kg; 8.1 st)
- Division: Strawweight (115 lb)
- Team: AMERICAN JIU-JITSU ACADEMY

Mixed martial arts record
- Total: 13
- Wins: 7
- By submission: 5
- By decision: 2
- Losses: 6
- By knockout: 3
- By submission: 1
- By decision: 2

Other information
- Boxing record from BoxRec
- Mixed martial arts record from Sherdog

Sarah Schneider (born August 30, 1980) is an American mixed martial artist who competes in the Strawweight division. She is currently signed with Invicta FC.

== Mixed martial arts record ==
Professional record breakdown
13 matches	7 wins	6 losses
By knockout	3	3
By submission	2	1
By decision	2	2

Res.	Record	Opponent	Method	Event	Date	Round	Time	Location	Notes
Win	7–6	Amber Stautzenberger	Decision (Unanimous)	EB - Beatdown at 4 Bears 11	June 7, 2014	3	5:00	North Dakota, United States	
Loss	6–6	Carla Esparza	TKO (Punches)	Invicta FC 2	July 28, 2012	2	4:28	Kansas, United States	
Win	6–5	Sally Krumdiack	Submission (Armbar)	Invicta FC 1	April 28, 2012	1	3:01	Kansas, United States	
Win	5–5	Ivana Coleman	Submission (Armbar)	BEP 5 - Breast Cancer Beatdown	October 30, 2011	1	4:30	North Carolina, United States	
Loss	4–5	Megumi Fujii	TKO (Punches)	Bellator 21	June 30, 2010	1	3:58	Florida, United States	
Loss	4–4	Adrienna Jenkins	Submission (Rear-Naked Choke)	FCF - Freestyle Cage Fighting 39	January 30, 2010	2	3:07	Oklahoma, United States	
Loss	4–3	Sarah Kaufman	TKO (Punches)	PFC: Best of Both Worlds 2	April 23, 2009	2	1:43	California, United States	
Win	4–2	Julie Kedzie	Submission (Rear-Naked Choke)	MF - Matrix Fights 6	March 14, 2009	1	2:01	New Mexico, United States	
Loss	3–2	Jennifer Tate	Decision (Split)	PureCombat 6 - Halloween Bash	November 1, 2008	2	4:45	Connecticut, United States	
Loss	3–1	Tonya Evinger	Decision (Decision)	TFF - True Fight Fans	June 6, 2008	3	5:00	Missouri, United States	
Win	3–0	Ashley Sanchez	Decision (Unanimous)	FFF 4 - Call of the Wild	April 3, 2008	5	3:00	Los Angeles, United States	
Win	2–0	Kaitlin Young	Submission (Armbar)	Tuff-N-Uff - Thompson vs. Troyer	February 1, 2008	2	0:35	Las Vegas, United States	
Win	1–0	Corinna West	Submission (Armbar)	TFC 9 - Summer Mayhem 2	September 22, 2007	1	0:50	Kansas, United States	
