= Sarah Kaufman =

Canadian mixed martial arts (MMA) fighter

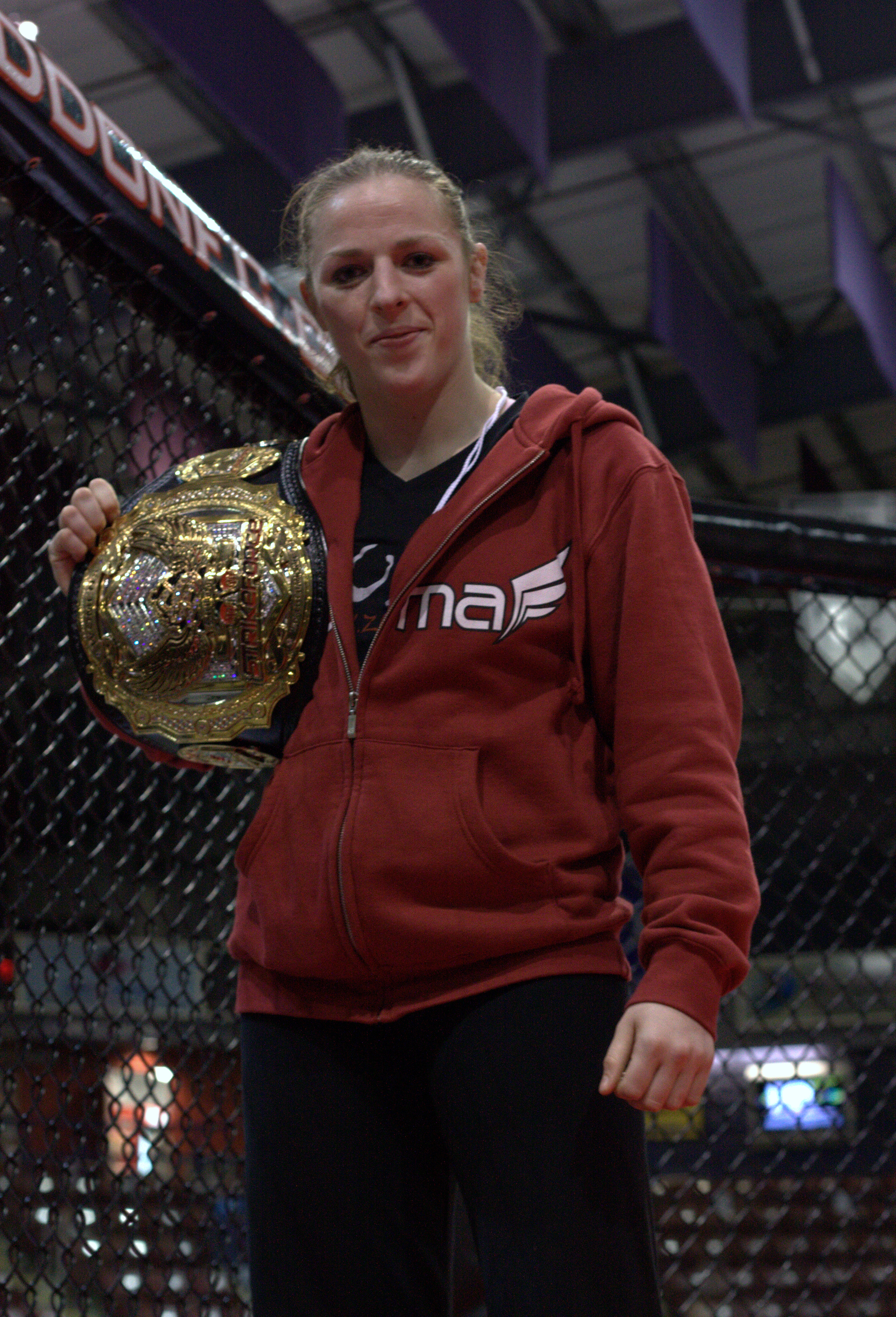
- Kaufman with the Strikeforce women's bantamweight belt at AFC II Aftershock in 2010
- Born: Sarah Elizabeth Kaufman; September 20, 1985 (age 41); Victoria, British Columbia, Canada
- Nationality: Canadian
- Height: 5 ft 5 in (1.65 m)
- Weight: 135 lb (61 kg; 9.6 st)
- Division: Bantamweight (2006–2019); Lightweight (2019–present)
- Reach: 66.0 in (168 cm)
- Style: Kickboxing, Brazilian Jiu-Jitsu
- Fighting out of: Victoria, British Columbia, Canada
- Team: Zugec Ultimate Martial Arts; Jackson's MMA
- Rank: Black belt in Brazilian Jiu-Jitsu
- Years active: 2006–2022 (MMA)

Mixed martial arts record
- Total: 28
- Wins: 22
- By knockout: 11
- By submission: 2
- By decision: 9
- Losses: 5
- By submission: 3
- By decision: 2
- No contests: 1

Other information
- Mixed martial arts record from Sherdog

Sarah Elizabeth Kaufman (born September 20, 1985) is a retired Canadian mixed martial artist (MMA). She competed in the women's bantamweight division where she is a former Invicta FC Bantamweight Champion. Kaufman was the inaugural Strikeforce Women's Bantamweight Champion and was also the first and only Hardcore Championship Fighting Women's Bantamweight Champion.

== Biography ==
Kaufman is a graduate of Claremont Secondary School and attended two years at the University of Victoria with a goal of becoming a cardiovascular surgeon. Kaufman's father is Jewish.

A dancer since the age of two, Kaufman had joined a dance company and danced everything from ballet to jazz to hip-hop. When she was 17, an MMA school was opened by Adam Zugec in the building where her dance company rehearsed. She joined the school for an aerobics kickboxing class. Enjoying it, she quickly began taking as many classes as Zugec offered.

While being interviewed on February 15, 2010 by MMA Junkie Radio, Kaufman revealed that she had obtained a purple belt in Brazilian Jiu-Jitsu. She was awarded her brown belt on October 1, 2011.

== Mixed martial arts career ==
Kaufman faced Valérie Létourneau at TKO 29 - Repercussion on June 1, 2007. She won the fight via TKO in the second round. This was the first female MMA fight in the promotion's history.

She captured the Hardcore Championship Fighting Women's Bantamweight Championship by defeating Ginele Marquez via TKO in the second round at HCF - Title Wave on October 19, 2007.

Kaufman faced Molly Helsel at HCF - Crow's Nest on March 29, 2008. She won the fight via TKO in the second round. This was her only title defense before the promotion folded in 2008.

On April 23, 2009, she faced Sarah Schneider for Palace Fighting Championship and won the fight via TKO in the second round.

Kaufman debuted for Armageddon Fighting Championship on April 2, 2011 at the promotion's fifth event, Judgment Day, where she fought in front of her hometown of Victoria, British Columbia. She defeated Megumi Yabushita by TKO in the third round of the main event.

=== Strikeforce ===
Less than one month later on May 15, 2009 at Strikeforce Challengers: Evangelista vs. Aina, Kaufman made her Strikeforce debut as a late replacement against wrestler Miesha Tate. Kaufman won the fight by Unanimous Decision. It was the first time that she had gone the distance in her career.

She fought again five weeks later on June 19, 2009 at Strikeforce Challengers: Villasenor vs. Cyborg against submission specialist Shayna Baszler and once again won via Unanimous Decision. The fight marked the first time that a women's bout was contested under five-minute rounds in Strikeforce.

==== Women's Bantamweight Champion ====
Kaufman was set to face highly touted Japanese standout Takayo Hashi at Strikeforce Challengers: Kaufman vs. Hashi on November 20, 2009, but the fight was later removed from the card. It was first rescheduled for January 2010, but finally took place on February 26, 2010. The fight crowned the first Strikeforce Women's Bantamweight Champion (135 lbs). Kaufman won the fight by Unanimous Decision.

In an interview posted on May 12, 2010, Kaufman stated that she was no longer under contract with Strikeforce. However, Strikeforce maintained that Kaufman's contract was automatically extended following her title victory over Takayo Hashi and she remained with the promotion.

Kaufman defended her Strikeforce title against Roxanne Modafferi at Strikeforce Challengers: del Rosario vs. Mahe on July 23, 2010. She won the fight via knockout due to a slam in the third round.

Kaufman faced Marloes Coenen on October 9, 2010 in San Jose, California. Kaufman was defeated by Coenen at 1:59 of the third round by submission after tapping out to an armbar applied from the bottom. This marked the first loss in Kaufman's MMA career and she relinquished the Women's Bantamweight Championship.

==== After losing Championship ====
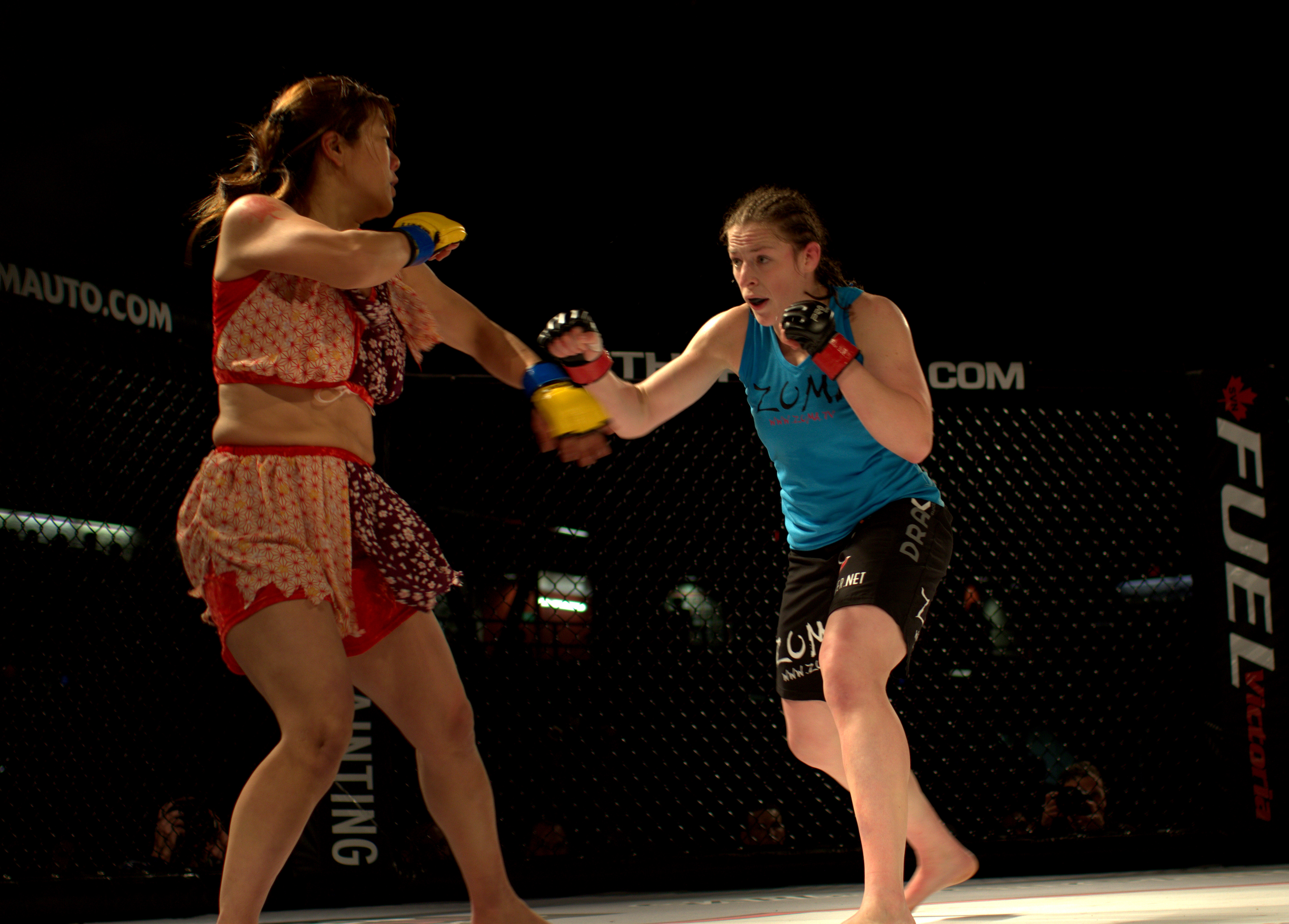
Kaufman (right) versus Megumi Yabushita at Armageddon Fighting Championship 5: Judgment Day

On July 22, 2011, Kaufman defeated Liz Carmouche via unanimous decision at Strikeforce Challengers: Voelker vs. Bowling III in Las Vegas, Nevada.

On January 7, 2012, it was announced that Kaufman would face Alexis Davis in a rematch at Strikeforce: Tate vs. Rousey on March 3 in Columbus, Ohio. Kaufman won the back and forth bout via majority decision.

Kaufman challenged Women's Bantamweight Champion Ronda Rousey on August 18, 2012, in San Diego, California. She was defeated by submission due to an armbar early in the first round.

Kaufman's tenure with Strikeforce ended when the promotion ran its final show in January 2013, having been purchased and eventually closed by UFC owners Zuffa LLC.

=== Invicta Fighting Championships ===
Kaufman was scheduled to make her Invicta FC debut against Kaitlin Young at Invicta Fighting Championships 3 on October 6, 2012. However, on September 17, it was reported that Kaufman had suffered an injury and would not be able to compete.

Kaufman faced Leslie Smith at Invicta FC 5: Penne vs. Waterson on April 5, 2013. This was her promotional debut. She won the back-and-forth fight via split decision. The bout was named Fight of the Night.

=== Ultimate Fighting Championship ===
On February 25, 2013, Kaufman signed with the Ultimate Fighting Championship along with four other women. She was expected to make her promotional debut against Sara McMann at UFC Fight Night 27 on August 28, 2013. However, McMann withdrew from the bout for undisclosed personal reasons. As a result, Kaufman was pulled from the event as well.

Kaufman faced fellow UFC newcomer Jessica Eye at UFC 166 on October 19, 2013. She lost the fight via controversial split decision. However, in February 2014, the Texas Department of Licensing and Regulation changed the result to "no decision" with no reason given for the change. It was later revealed that Eye had failed her post-fight drug test for marijuana.

Kaufman was expected to face Shayna Baszler at The Ultimate Fighter Nations Finale. However, it was announced on April 1, 2014 that Baszler pulled out due to injury. Kaufman was then scheduled to face Amanda Nunes, but Nunes withdrew as well. Kaufman eventually faced former opponent Leslie Smith on the card. She won the fight via unanimous decision.

After over a year away from the sport, Kaufman returned to face Alexis Davis for a third time on April 25, 2015 at UFC 186. Despite seemingly winning the first round due to her dominant striking, Kaufman lost the fight in the second round via submission.

Kaufman was scheduled to face Germaine de Randamie at UFC on Fox: dos Anjos vs. Cowboy 2. However, De Randamie pulled out of the fight on December 3 citing an injury. Kaufman instead faced Valentina Shevchenko. She lost the fight via split decision.

Kaufman became a free agent after the UFC did not resign her to a new contract after the loss to Valentina Shevchenko.

=== Invicta Fighting Championships ===
It was announced on December 6, 2017 that Kaufman was signed by Invicta Fighting Championships.

Kaufman faced Pannie Kianzad on January 13, 2018 at Invicta FC 27. At weight-ins, Kianzad weighted 136.7 Ibs, missing 1.7 Ibs of the upper limit of bantamweight of 135 Ibs and the bout proceeded at catchweight. Kianzad was fined twenty five percent of her purse for falling make weight. Kaufman won the fight via unanimous decision.

Kaufman faced German bantamweight Katharina Lehner at Invicta FC 29 on May 4 with the vacant Invicta FC bantamweight title on the line. Kaufman won the bout in the third round via rear-naked choke.

=== Professional Fighters League ===
In 2019, Kaufman joined the Professional Fighters League to compete in their Women's Lightweight tournament. In the opening round, she faced Morgan Frier at PFL 1 on May 9, 2019. She won the fight via an arm-triangle choke submission in the first round to earn 6 points in the first round.

Kaufman was expected to face Roberta Samad at PFL 4 on July 11, 2019. However, Samad missed weight and the bout was cancelled with Kaufman being awarded 3 points. In the semifinals, Kaufman faced Larissa Pacheco at PFL 7 on October 11, 2019. She lost the fight via unanimous decision.

=== Return to regional circuit ===
Kaufman faced Bellator vet Jessy Miele on November 20, 2021 at BTC 13: Power. She won the bout via TKO due to ground and pound in the first round.

Kaufman was scheduled to face Cláudia Leite for the inaugural PAW FC Women's Bantamweight Championship at PAW FC 1 on January 15, 2022. However, the bout was cancelled after Leite was unable to obtain a visa.

Kaufman announced her retirement from MMA on June 30, 2022.

== Championships and accomplishments ==
=== Mixed martial arts ===
- Invicta Fighting Championships
  - Fight of the Night (One time) vs. Leslie Smith
  - Invicta FC Bantamweight Championship (one time)
- Strikeforce
  - Strikeforce Women's Bantamweight Championship (One time, first)
    - One successful title defense
- Hardcore Championship Fighting
  - HCF Women's Bantamweight Championship (One time)
- Women's MMA Awards
  - 2009 Fighter of the Year
  - 2009 Bantamweight Fighter of the Year
  - 2012 Fight of the Year vs. Alexis Davis

== Mixed martial arts record ==
Professional record breakdown
28 matches	22 wins	5 losses
By knockout	11	0
By submission	2	3
By decision	9	2
No contests	1	

Res.	Record	Opponent	Method	Event	Date	Round	Time	Location	Notes
Win	22–5 (1)	Jessy Miele	TKO (punches)	BTC 13: Power	November 20, 2021	1	3:56	St. Catharines, Ontario, Canada	Featherweight debut.
Loss	21–5 (1)	Larissa Pacheco	Decision (unanimous)	PFL 7	October 11, 2019	3	5:00	Las Vegas, Nevada, United States	2019 PFL Women's Lightweight Tournament Semifinal.
Win	21–4 (1)	Morgan Frier	Submission (arm-triangle choke)	PFL 1	May 9, 2019	1	2:22	Uniondale, New York, United States	Lightweight debut.
Win	20–4 (1)	Katharina Lehner	Submission (rear-naked choke)	Invicta FC 29: Kaufman vs. Lehner	May 4, 2018	3	4:30	Kansas City, Missouri, United States	Won the vacant Invicta FC Bantamweight Championship.
Win	19–4 (1)	Pannie Kianzad	Decision (unanimous)	Invicta FC 27: Kaufman vs. Kianzad	January 13, 2018	3	5:00	Kansas City, Missouri, United States	
Win	18–4 (1)	Jessica-Rose Clark	Decision (unanimous)	Battlefield FC: Korea	March 18, 2017	3	5:00	Seoul, South Korea	
Loss	17–4 (1)	Valentina Shevchenko	Decision (split)	UFC on Fox: dos Anjos vs. Cowboy 2	December 19, 2015	3	5:00	Orlando, Florida, United States	
Loss	17–3 (1)	Alexis Davis	Submission (armbar)	UFC 186	April 25, 2015	2	1:52	Montreal, Quebec, Canada	
Win	17–2 (1)	Leslie Smith	Decision (unanimous)	The Ultimate Fighter Nations Finale: Bisping vs. Kennedy	April 16, 2014	3	5:00	Quebec City, Quebec, Canada	
NC	16–2 (1)	Jessica Eye	NC (overturned)	UFC 166	October 19, 2013	3	5:00	Houston, Texas, United States	Originally a split decision win for Eye; overturned after she tested positive for marijuana.
Win	16–2	Leslie Smith	Decision (split)	Invicta FC 5: Penne vs. Waterson	April 5, 2013	3	5:00	Kansas City, Missouri, United States	Fight of the Night.
Loss	15–2	Ronda Rousey	Submission (armbar)	Strikeforce: Rousey vs. Kaufman	August 18, 2012	1	0:54	San Diego, California, United States	For the Strikeforce Women's Bantamweight Championship.
Win	15–1	Alexis Davis	Decision (majority)	Strikeforce: Tate vs. Rousey	March 3, 2012	3	5:00	Columbus, Ohio, United States	
Win	14–1	Liz Carmouche	Decision (unanimous)	Strikeforce Challengers: Voelker vs. Bowling III	July 22, 2011	3	5:00	Las Vegas, Nevada, United States	
Win	13–1	Megumi Yabushita	TKO (punches)	AFC 5: Judgment Day	April 2, 2011	3	3:34	Victoria, British Columbia, Canada	
Loss	12–1	Marloes Coenen	Submission (armbar)	Strikeforce: Diaz vs. Noons II	October 9, 2010	3	1:59	San Jose, California, United States	Lost the Strikeforce Women's Bantamweight Championship.
Win	12–0	Roxanne Modafferi	KO (slam)	Strikeforce Challengers: del Rosario vs. Mahe	July 23, 2010	3	4:45	Everett, Washington, United States	Defended the Strikeforce Women's Bantamweight Championship.
Win	11–0	Takayo Hashi	Decision (unanimous)	Strikeforce Challengers: Kaufman vs. Hashi	February 26, 2010	5	5:00	San Jose, California, United States	Won the inaugural Strikeforce Women's Bantamweight Championship.
Win	10–0	Shayna Baszler	Decision (unanimous)	Strikeforce Challengers: Villasenor vs. Cyborg	June 19, 2009	3	5:00	Kent, Washington, United States	
Win	9–0	Miesha Tate	Decision (unanimous)	Strikeforce Challengers: Evangelista vs. Aina	May 15, 2009	3	3:00	Fresno, California, United States	
Win	8–0	Sarah Schneider	TKO (punches)	PFC: Best of Both Worlds 2	April 23, 2009	2	1:43	Lemoore, California, United States	
Win	7–0	Molly Helsel	TKO (punches)	HCF: Crow's Nest	March 29, 2008	2	2:44	Gatineau, Quebec, Canada	Defended the HCF Women's Bantamweight Championship.
Win	6–0	Ginele Marquez	TKO (punches)	HCF: Title Wave	October 19, 2007	2	3:22	Calgary, Alberta, Canada	Won the HCF Women's Bantamweight Championship.
Win	5–0	Valérie Létourneau	TKO (punches)	TKO 29: Repercussion	June 1, 2007	2	1:36	Montreal, Quebec, Canada	
Win	4–0	Alexis Davis	TKO (punches)	UWC 7: Anarchy	April 7, 2007	3	N/A	Winnipeg, Manitoba, Canada	
Win	3–0	Misty Shearer	TKO (doctor stoppage)	King of the Cage: Amplified	November 26, 2006	2	5:00	Edmonton, Alberta, Canada	
Win	2–0	Sarah Draht	TKO (punches)	King of the Cage: Insurrection	October 6, 2006	1	0:17	Vernon, British Columbia, Canada	
Win	1–0	Liz Posener	KO (punch)	North American Challenge 23	June 3, 2006	3	1:03	Vancouver, British Columbia, Canada	

== See also ==
- List of female mixed martial artists
- List of Canadian UFC fighters

Awards and achievements
Preceded by Yana Kunitskaya	4th Invicta FC Bantamweight Champion; May 4, 2018 – May 9, 2019	Succeeded by Julija Stoliarenko
Preceded by New championship	1st Strikeforce Women's Bantamweight Champion; February 26, 2010 – October 9, 2010	Succeeded by Marloes Coenen
