= Julia Berezikova =

Russian mixed martial arts fighter

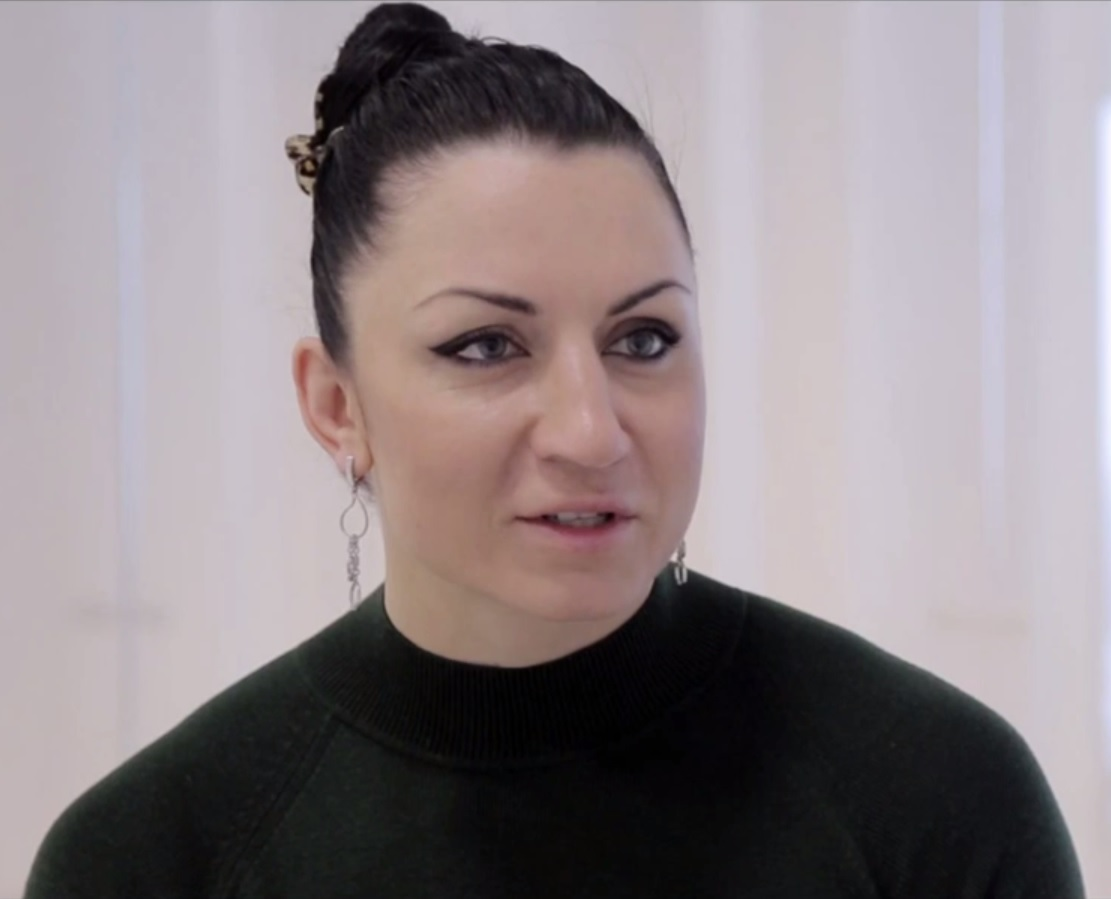
- Berezikova in 2015
- Born: November 17, 1983 (age 42); Krasnokamensk, Chita Oblast, Russian SFSR, Soviet Union
- Other names: Berezka (English: Birch)
- Nationality: Russian
- Height: 1.67 m (5 ft 5 1/2 in)
- Weight: 57.0 kg (125.7 lb)
- Style: Boxing, Sanshou
- Stance: Orthodox
- Fighting out of: Saint Petersburg, Russia
- Team: RusFighters Sport Club (2008-present); Red Devil Sport Club (2006-2007)
- Trainer: Sergei Nikitin
- Years active: 2006-present

Mixed martial arts record
- Total: 11
- Wins: 7
- By knockout: 1
- By submission: 3
- By decision: 3
- Losses: 4
- By knockout: 1
- By submission: 2
- By decision: 1

Other information
- Website: Archived website
- Mixed martial arts record from Sherdog
- Last updated on: February 1, 2014

Julia Alexandrovna Berezikova (Russian: Юлия Березикова, romanized: Julija Berezikova; born November 17, 1983) is a Russian female mixed martial artist and boxer. In February, 2014 she was the #7-ranked 125-pound female fighter in the world according to the Unified Women's MMA Rankings. She has not fought since she knocked out Rosy Duarte in October 2015. She is a W5 World Champion and is also a champion in Brazilian Jiu-Jitsu, Judo, Boxing, Sanda, Sambo and Muay Thai.

== Background ==
Berezikova was born on November 17, 1983 in Krasnokamensk, Zabaykalsky Krai (at the time Chita Oblast), Russia.

During her childhood, Berezikova injured her back after an unsuccessful flip and her doctors thought that she would not be able to practice sport any longer, but she was able to make a complete recovery.

Berezikova arrived in Saint Petersburg in 1999, and in 2001 she first learned about MMA.

Berezikova's brother was an acquaintance of Roman Zentsov, who recommended that Berezikova begin training in boxing to combine it with her knowledge of judo.

Berezikova became a medalist in Wushu Sanda in 2003. From 2003 to 2005, she was the champion of Saint Petersburg in boxing, the winner of Russia's Boxing Cup in 2003, winner of the Russian boxing championship in 2004 and 2005, Saint Petersburg combat sambo champion in 2004 and Russia Jiu-jitsu champion in 2008.

While in Saint Petersburg, Berezikova met Vladislav Lavrinovich, who was putting together MMA events. Berezikova asked him to give her a chance, and although he refused at first, he eventually decided to allow her to compete.

== Mixed martial arts career ==
Berezikova debuted professionally on December 2, 2006 at bodogFight: USA vs. Russia in Vancouver, being defeated by then #1 female fighter Tara LaRosa by armbar submission in the second round; an accomplishment, according to Berezikova, since she was a rookie in MMA.

Berezikova next faced South Korean MMA debutant Song Lee Jin, whom Berezikova quickly defeated by TKO in 51 seconds at M-1 Global's event M-1 MFC: Russia vs. Korea on January 20, 2007 in South Korea.

On April 14, 2007 at bodogFight: Clash of the Nations, Berezikova was defeated by American Julie Kedzie in the second via TKO (referee stoppage) after Kedzie trapped Berezikova with a leg triangle from which Kedzie punched Berezikova freely, preventing her from escaping or defending.

At bodogFight: Vancouver on August 24, 2007, Berezikova was defeated by English fighter Rosi Sexton via submission (armbar) in round two.

Debuting with MMA promotion FightForce, Berezikova faced the experienced Japanese judoka and former Smackgirl open weight champion Megumi Yabushita. Berezikova was able to defeat Yabushita by unanimous decision after a competitive match on April 19, 2008 at the event FightForce: Russia vs. The World in Saint Petersburg, Russia.

Originally set to fight against French Tevi Say, who had to retire from the match due to an injury, Berezikova defeated fellow Russian Milana Dudieva by submission (punches) in the first round at FightForce: Day of Anger on February 28, 2009.

Berezikova returned to MMA on November 5, 2011 and won her next two fights. On May 26, 2012, Berezikova defeated Karla Benitez by split decision at Far Eastern Federation of Modern Pankration: Mayor Cup 2012.

Berezikova faced Benitez in a rematch at Super Fight League 12 on December 7, 2012 in Mumbai, India. She defeated Benitez by submission due to an armbar in round two.

Returning to Moscow, Berezikova was defeated by Polish fighter, Joanna Jędrzejczyk by unanimous decision after two rounds at Fight Nights: Battle of Moscow 12 on June 20, 2013.

== Boxing ==
Berezikova took part in a boxing exhibition match against the Women's International Boxing Association (WIBA) champion Emiko Raika on June 1, 2007 at Korakuen Hall in Tokyo, Japan. She has also participated in other exhibition matches in Japan.

== Kickboxing ==
Berezikova was slated to compete in a K-1 rules match on December 19, 2009 in Germany.

== Outside sports ==
Berezikova posed topless for the Russian version of Penthouse in the issue of February 2008.

Berezikova has worked as consultant of fight scenes for some Russian productions. She was a participant of Russia Channel One's show Big Races.

Along with fellow MMA fighter Aleksander Emelianenko and other Russian athletes, Berezikova participated in the 2010 Russian TV series starring Yevgeni Sidikhin, Olympic Village.

== Mixed martial arts record ==
Professional record breakdown
12 matches	8 wins	4 losses
By knockout	1	1
By submission	4	2
By decision	3	1

Res.	Record	Opponent	Method	Event	Date	Round	Time	Location	Notes
Win	9–4	Rosy Duarte	TKO (punches and knees)	EFN: Fight Nights Petersburg	October 23, 2015	2	1:08	Saint Petersburg, Russia	
Win	8–4	Juliana Werner	Submission (leg lock)	XFC International 9	March 14, 2015	2	1:35	São Paulo, Brazil	
Loss	7–4	Joanna Jędrzejczyk	Decision (unanimous)	Fight Nights: Battle of Moscow 12	June 20, 2013	2	5:00	Moscow, Russia	
Win	7–3	Karla Benitez	Submission (armbar)	Super Fight League 12	December 7, 2012	2	1:42	Mumbai, India	
Win	6–3	Karla Benitez	Decision (split)	FEFoMP: Mayor Cup 2012	May 26, 2012	2	5:00	Khabarovsk, Russia	
Win	5–3	Alena Hola	Submission (armbar)	Fight Nights: Battle of Moscow 6	March 8, 2012	2	1:35	Moscow, Russia	
Win	4–3	Eugenia Kostina	Decision (unanimous)	Fight Nights: Battle of Moscow 5	November 5, 2011	2	3:00	Moscow, Russia	
Win	3–3	Milana Dudieva	Submission (punches)	FightForce: Day of Anger	February 28, 2009	1	4:40	Saint Petersburg, Russia	
Win	2–3	Megumi Yabushita	Decision (unanimous)	FightForce: Russia vs. The World	April 19, 2008	3	5:00	Saint Petersburg, Russia	
Loss	1–3	Rosi Sexton	Submission (armbar)	bodogFight: Vancouver	August 24, 2007	2	1:49	Vancouver, Canada	
Loss	1–2	Julie Kedzie	TKO (punches)	bodogFight: Clash of the Nations	April 14, 2007	2	2:49	Saint Petersburg, Russia	
Win	1–1	Song Lee Jin	TKO (punches)	M-1 MFC: Russia vs. Korea	January 20, 2007	1	0:51	South Korea	
Loss	0–1	Tara LaRosa	Submission (armbar)	bodogFight: USA vs. Russia	December 2, 2006	2	1:28	Vancouver, Canada	

== Professional boxing record ==
2 Wins (2 TKOs), 0 Losses, 0 Drawn
Res.	Record	Opponent	Type	Round	Time	Date	Location	Notes
Win	2–0	(Hungary) Dalia Vasarhelyi	TKO	4	0:43	November 8, 2014	Yunost, Klimovsk, Russia	Featherweight
Win	1–0	(Ukraine) Nadezhda Khaenok	TKO	3	1:29	November 16, 2013	Ivanhoe Country Club, Podolsk, Russia	Super Bantamweight

== Championships and accomplishments ==
=== Sanshou ===
- Medalist of Russia in Wushu Sanda 2003.

=== Boxing ===
- Saint Petersburg champion 2003-2005.
- Russian Cup winner in 2003.
- Russia boxing championship winner 2004, 2005.

=== Sambo ===
- Saint Petersburg Combat Sambo Champion in 2004.

== See also ==
- List of female mixed martial artists
- List of female boxers
