= Jennifer Tate =

American martial artist

- Born: Jennifer Rose Tate; September 2, 1985 (age 41); Lodi, California, United States
- Other names: Rosebud
- Height: 5 ft 5 in (1.65 m)
- Weight: 125 lb (57 kg; 8.9 st)
- Fighting out of: Stockton, California
- Team: Gracie Sports Center
- Rank: Black belt in Brazilian Jiu-Jitsu; Black belt in Taekwondo
- Years active: 2006–2010

Mixed martial arts record
- Total: 7
- Wins: 6
- By knockout: 1
- By submission: 4
- By decision: 1
- Losses: 1
- By submission: 1

Other information
- Mixed martial arts record from Sherdog

Jennifer Rose Tate (born September 2, 1985) is an American female mixed martial artist. Tate started training in Taekwondo at the age of 13, and she earned her Black belt. She was the Northern California Golden Gloves champion in 2007 and 2008. She was also a contestant on the Muay Thai themed reality series Fight Girls. In episode five, Tate fought and loss to fellow housemate Miriam Nakamoto to a split decision. She fought in Thailand 4 times winning all four fights. Tate is 1-0 as a professional boxer. Tate is trained by Moses Cortes Stockton, California with boxing coach Richard Perez.

== Early life ==
Tate was born in Lodi, California on September 2, 1985. She got involved with taekwondo during her teens and received a black belt.

== Mixed martial arts career ==
Tate made her mixed martial arts debut on June 3, 2006 and submitted Tonya Evinger with a triangle choke in the second round. The fight was the first women's bout ever sanctioned by the California State Athletic Commission. She won the fight by triangle choke in the second round.

After two wins in the Global Knockout promotion, Tate submitted Angela Hayes with a first-round armbar at EFWC - The Untamed on October 6, 2007 in the first sanctioned women's bout in the city of Orange County, California.

On October 26, 2007, Tate made her ShoXC debut against and lost to Shayna Baszler by armbar in 44 seconds. Following the fight, Tate tested positive for marijuana. Tate was fined $500, before she was officially suspended for three months.

Tate returned to mixed martial arts competition at Pure Combat - Halloween Bash on November 1, 2008. She defeated Sarah Schneider by Split Decision.

On January 30, 2010, Tate entered the Freestyle Cage Fighting Women's Bantamweight Grand Prix at FCF 39 and submitted fellow EliteXC veteran Kaitlin Young with an armbar in the second round.

Tate withdrew from the FCF tournament on March 4, 2010 after announcing that she was pregnant with her second child.

== Personal life ==
Tate's first son is named Richard. Tate had her second child with her boyfriend Moses, a son named Jacob, on October 29, 2010.

== Mixed martial arts record ==
Professional record breakdown
7 matches	6 wins	1 loss
By knockout	1	0
By submission	4	1
By decision	1	0

Res.	Record	Opponent	Method	Event	Date	Round	Time	Location	Notes
Win	6-1	Kaitlin Young	Submission (armbar)	Freestyle Cage Fighting 39	January 30, 2010	2	2:35	Shawnee, Oklahoma, United States	
Win	5-1	Sarah Schneider	Decision (split)	Pure Combat - Halloween Bash	November 1, 2008	3	3:00	Sacramento, California, United States	
Loss	4-1	Shayna Baszler	Submission (armbar)	ShoXC: Elite Challenger Series	October 26, 2007	1	0:44	Santa Ynez, California, United States	
Win	4-0	Angela Hayes	Submission (armbar)	EFWC - The Untamed	October 6, 2007	1	1:08	Anaheim, California, United States	
Win	3-0	Kim Gibson	KO (punches)	Global Knockout 3	August 2, 2007	1	0:07	Jackson, California, United States	
Win	2-0	Katrina Alendal	Submission (rear-naked choke)	Global Knockout 1	October 26, 2006	1	4:58	Jackson, California, United States	
Win	1-0	Tonya Evinger	Submission (triangle choke)	IFC - Warriors Challenge 21	June 3, 2006	2	1:56	Tuolumne, California, United States	First women's bout ever sanctioned by the California State Athletic Commission.

== Bare knuckle record ==
Professional record breakdown
1 match	0 wins	1 loss
By knockout	0	1

Res.	Record	Opponent	Method	Event	Date	Round	Time	Location	Notes
Lose	0-1	Christine Ferea	TKO (Punches)	BKFC 3	October 20, 2018	1	1:55	Biloxi, Mississippi, United States	
