= McDowell High School (North Carolina) =

American public school in North Carolina

Location
- 600 McDowell High Dr; Marion, North Carolina 28752; United States; 35°42′01″N 82°02′24″W

Information
- Type: Public
- Motto: "Pathway to World Class Opportunities and Excellence"
- Established: 1971 (55 years ago)
- CEEB code: 342485
- Principal: Tracey Widmann
- Staff: 90.85 (FTE)
- Grades: 9–12
- Enrollment: 1,384 (2023–2024)
- Student to teacher ratio: 15.23
- Colors: Royal blue, silver, and scarlet
- Team name: Titans
- Website: www.mhs.mcdowell.k12.nc.us

McDowell High School is a public high school located in the Western North Carolina town of Marion. The school has approximately 1,700–1,800 students. The school was built in 1971, though the building was not occupied until 1972. It was formed from several pre-existing community schools in McDowell County.

== Alma mater ==
The first official performance of the McDowell High "Alma Mater" was on November 11, 1976, during a McDowell High School Band Concert. The first live performance of the McDowell High "Alma Mater" took place during a football game in the fall of 1976. The words were composed by Mrs. Alice Ostrom, a noted North Carolina poet, and Angela Israel, a student of Captain Ostrom. The musical score was composed by Capt. Ralph K. Ostrom, Ret. In addition to having served as band director at Marion High, Captain Ostrom studied with the United States Army Band and was director of the Tenth Division Band Training School.

== Athletics ==
View of McDowell High School from the football stadium in 2009

McDowell is a member of the North Carolina High School Athletic Association (NCHSAA) and are classified as a 7A school. The school is a part of the Northwestern 6A/7A Conference. McDowell's sports teams are known as the Titans, with the school colors being royal blue, silver, and scarlet.

McDowell has had success in both men's and women's basketball. In 1976, the men's basketball team finished as the North Carolina 4A state runner-up. The women's basketball team were North Carolina 4A state champions in 1991, and finished as the 4A state runner-up in 1998, 1999 and 2004.

== Notable alumni ==
- Greg Holland (2004), MLB pitcher and 3x All-Star selection
- Dwayne Ledford (1995), former NFL center
- Sara McMann (1998), silver medalist at the 2004 Summer Olympics in women's freestyle wrestling; professional mixed martial arts fighter in Bellator MMA having also competed in the UFC's bantamweight division
- Orlando Melendez (1997), professional basketball player, also played with the Harlem Globetrotters
