= Ashlee Evans-Smith =

American mixed martial arts fighter

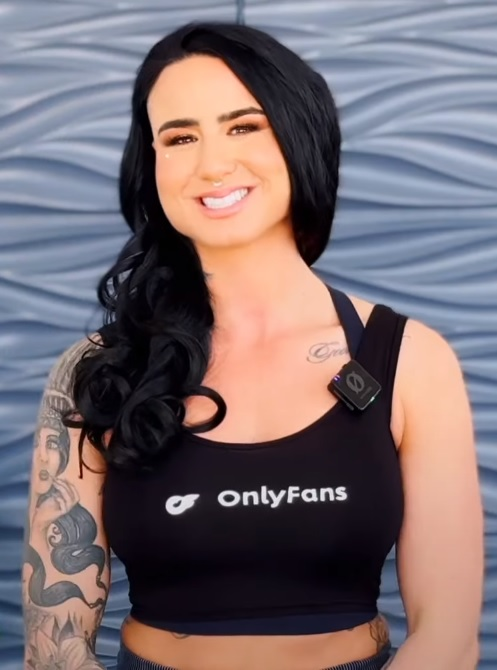
- Evans-Smith in 2024
- Born: July 9, 1987 (age 39); Ukiah, California, U.S.
- Other names: Rebel Girl
- Height: 5 ft 8 in (1.73 m)
- Weight: 135 lb (61 kg; 9.6 st)
- Division: Flyweight; Bantamweight; Featherweight
- Reach: 67 in (170 cm)
- Team: Reign Training Center (2012); Subfighter MMA (2013–2016); Team Oyama (2016–2018)
- Rank: Blue belt in Brazilian Jiu-Jitsu

Mixed martial arts record
- Total: 12
- Wins: 6
- By knockout: 3
- By decision: 3
- Losses: 6
- By submission: 2
- By decision: 4

Other information
- University: Menlo College
- Mixed martial arts record from Sherdog

Ashlee Evans-Smith (born July 9, 1987) is an American mixed martial artist who competes in the women's flyweight and bantamweight divisions. She competed in the Ultimate Fighting Championship (UFC). She has her own podcast called Sex & Violence with Rebel Girl.

== Mixed martial arts career ==
As an amateur, Ashlee Evans-Smith had a record of 5–4 and is the former Tuff-N-Uff Champion. Her four losses were against women with a combined amateur record of 20–1–1. She also has a notable victory over former UFC fighter Jessamyn Duke.

Evans-Smith began her professional career on March 2, 2013, in the quarterfinals for the CFA Women's PGA Tournament. In an arduous battle, full of twists, against her former amateur rival, Tori Adams, Evans-Smith won by unanimous decision, thus avenging a past loss.

She was then scheduled to fight Peggy Morgan in the semi-final round at CFA 11 but was removed from the card after auditioning for TUF 18. A recent report from The Wrestling Observer Newsletter announced that Evans-Smith was one of the 17 fighters selected for TUF 18 but at age 25, instead preferred to regain her place in the CFA tournament.

Evans-Smith automatically advanced to the finals because Morgan was removed from the tournament. Then news surfaced that she would face transgender fighter Fallon Fox because Morgan's opponent, Anna Barone, could not make the weight.

=== Fox vs. Evans-Smith ===
On October 12, 2013, Evans-Smith made it to the finals of the CFA 12 tournament, entering as a heavy underdog, reaching +425 in the bookmakers' odds. After a back-and-forth first round, she started taking over in the second round. The round ended in controversy because while Evans-Smith was applying punches from the top position, the referee failed to hear the signal announcing the end of the round, so she continued to beat on Fallon Fox. The referee called the fight a TKO in her favor when the round should have already been over. As Ashlee, her corner and the crowd celebrated, the referee informed her that he had made a mistake, and the fight would go to a third round. In the 3rd, Ashlee was able to get the top position again and managed to hit a wave of punches, until the referee intervened and stopped the fight, giving her the win by TKO in the third round.

=== WSOF ===
Evans-Smith then signed with the World Series of Fighting to fight Marciea Allen at WSOF 10. She won the bout by technical knockout in the third round.

=== Ultimate Fighting Championship ===
With a perfect 3–0 record, Evans-Smith had the first opportunity in the organization to fight Raquel Pennington on December 6, 2014, at UFC 181 following a neck injury to Pennington's original opponent Holly Holm. The fight was balanced and "locked," especially at the clinch, until Pennington secured a bulldog choke at the end of the round. When the round was over, it was revealed that Evans-Smith was unconscious due to the finish. The fight was interrupted between rounds 1 and 2, however, the official time is 4:59 of the first round. Ashlee soon after was suspended for diuretic use.

Evans-Smith faced Veronica Macedo on September 3, 2016, at UFC Fight Night 93. She won the fight via technical knockout in round three.

Evans-Smith faced Sarah Moras on September 9, 2017, at UFC 215. She lost the fight via armbar submission, resulting in her elbow being dislocated, in the first round.

Evans-Smith faced Bec Rawlings on April 7, 2018, at UFC 223. She won the fight by unanimous decision.

Evans-Smith was expected to face promotional newcomer Antonina Shevchenko on November 30, 2018, at The Ultimate Fighter 28 Finale. However, it was reported on November 8, 2018, that Evans-Smith pulled out of the event due to injury and she was replaced by Ji Yeon Kim.

Evans-Smith was scheduled to face Lauren Murphy on February 17, 2019, at UFC on ESPN 1. However, on December 19, 2018, Murphy announced and withdraw from the event as she would need more time off to recover from foot surgery. In turn, Evans-Smith faced Andrea Lee. Evans-Smith lost the fight by unanimous decision.

Evans-Smith was expected to face Taila Santos on August 10, 2019, at UFC on ESPN+ 14. However, Evans-Smith withdrew the bout for undisclosed reasons.

Evans-Smith was scheduled to face Molly McCann on March 21, 2020, at UFC Fight Night: Woodley vs. Edwards. Due to the COVID-19 pandemic, the event was eventually postponed.

Evans-Smith faced Norma Dumont on November 28, 2020, at UFC on ESPN: Blaydes vs. Lewis. She lost the fight via unanimous decision.

Evans-Smith was suspended by USADA for 14 months for testing positive for dehydroepiandrosterone retroactive from January 3, 2022. She was suspended until March 3, 2023.

After a two-and-a-half year layoff, Evans-Smith returned to face Ailín Pérez on July 15, 2023, at UFC Fight Night 224. She lost the fight via unanimous decision.

After the loss, it was announced that Evans-Smith was no longer on the UFC roster.

== Personal life ==
Evans-Smith has been a vegan since 2016.

== Championships and accomplishments ==
- Championship Fighting Alliance
  - CFA Women's Featherweight Championship (one time)

== Mixed martial arts record ==
Professional record breakdown
| 12 matches | 6 wins | 6 losses |
| By knockout | 3 | 0 |
| By submission | 0 | 2 |
| By decision | 3 | 4 |

| Res. | Record | Opponent | Method | Event | Date | Round | Time | Location | Notes |
|---|---|---|---|---|---|---|---|---|---|
| Loss | 6–6 | Ailín Pérez | Decision (unanimous) | UFC on ESPN: Holm vs. Bueno Silva | July 15, 2023 | 3 | 5:00 | Las Vegas, Nevada, United States | |
| Loss | 6–5 | Norma Dumont | Decision (unanimous) | UFC on ESPN: Smith vs. Clark | November 28, 2020 | 3 | 5:00 | Las Vegas, Nevada, United States | Return to Bantamweight; Dumont missed weight (139.5 lb). |
| Loss | 6–4 | Andrea Lee | Decision (unanimous) | UFC on ESPN: Ngannou vs. Velasquez | February 17, 2019 | 3 | 5:00 | Phoenix, Arizona, United States | |
| Win | 6–3 | Bec Rawlings | Decision (unanimous) | UFC 223 | April 7, 2018 | 3 | 5:00 | Brooklyn, New York, United States | Flyweight debut. |
| Loss | 5–3 | Sarah Moras | Submission (armbar) | UFC 215 | September 9, 2017 | 1 | 2:51 | Edmonton, Alberta, Canada | |
| Loss | 5–2 | Ketlen Vieira | Decision (unanimous) | UFC on Fox: Johnson vs. Reis | April 15, 2017 | 3 | 5:00 | Kansas City, Missouri, United States | |
| Win | 5–1 | Veronica Macedo | TKO (punches and elbows) | UFC Fight Night: Arlovski vs. Barnett | September 3, 2016 | 3 | 2:46 | Hamburg, Germany | |
| Win | 4–1 | Marion Reneau | Decision (split) | UFC Fight Night: Cowboy vs. Cowboy | February 21, 2016 | 3 | 5:00 | Pittsburgh, Pennsylvania, United States | |
| Loss | 3–1 | Raquel Pennington | Technical Submission (bulldog choke) | UFC 181 | December 6, 2014 | 1 | 4:59 | Las Vegas, Nevada, United States | Evans-Smith tested positive for hydrochlorothiazide. |
| Win | 3–0 | Marciea Allen | TKO (elbows) | WSOF 10 | June 21, 2014 | 3 | 3:01 | Las Vegas, Nevada, United States | Bantamweight debut; Allen missed weight (137 lb). |
| Win | 2–0 | Fallon Fox | TKO (punches) | CFA 12 | October 12, 2013 | 3 | 3:15 | Coral Gables, Florida, United States | Won the CFA Women's Featherweight Championship. |
| Win | 1–0 | Tori Adams | Decision (unanimous) | CFA 10 | March 2, 2013 | 3 | 5:00 | Coral Gables, Florida, United States | Featherweight debut. |

| Amateur record breakdown | | |
| 9 matches | 5 wins | 4 losses |
| By knockout | 3 | 1 |
| By submission | 0 | 3 |
| By decision | 2 | 0 |

| Res. | Record | Opponent | Method | Event | Date | Round | Time | Location | Notes |
|---|---|---|---|---|---|---|---|---|---|
| Loss | 5–4 | Veronica Rothenhausler | KO (punches) | Tuff-N-Uff: Festibrawl 2 | July 6, 2012 | 1 | 0:05 | Las Vegas, Nevada, United States | |
| Win | 5–3 | Bridgette Batch | Decision (unanimous) | Tuff-N-Uff: The Fist-ival | April 7, 2012 | 3 | 3:00 | Las Vegas, Nevada, United States | |
| Loss | 4–3 | Taylor Stratford | Submission (rear naked choke) | Tuff-N-Uff: Future Stars of MMA | March 12, 2011 | 2 | 1:01 | Las Vegas, Nevada, United States | |
| Loss | 4–2 | Ericka Newsome | Submission (guillotine choke) | Spar Star Promotions | February 18, 2011 | 3 | 1:19 | El Monte, California, United States | |
| Loss | 4–1 | Tori Adams | Submission (armbar) | Tuff-N-Uff: Xtreme Couture vs. Team Quest 2 | February 11, 2011 | 2 | 1:26 | Las Vegas, Nevada, United States | |
| Win | 4–0 | Jessamyn Duke | Decision (unanimous) | Tuff-N-Uff: Las Vegas vs. 10th Planet Riverside | January 7, 2011 | 3 | 2:00 | Las Vegas, Nevada, United States | |
| Win | 3–0 | Samantha Mosqueda | TKO (punches) | CCT 2: Central Coast Throwdown 2 | December 17, 2010 | 3 | 1:49 | Salinas, California, United States | |
| Win | 2–0 | Ashley Florence | TKO (punches) | Born To Fight 13 | November 7, 2010 | 1 | 1:15 | Fremont, California, United States | |
| Win | 1–0 | Stacie Seidner | TKO (punches) | Dragon House 4 | October 23, 2010 | 2 | 1:31 | San Francisco, California, United States | |
