= Marion Reneau =

American mixed martial arts fighter

- Born: June 20, 1977 (age 49); Tulare, California, U.S.
- Other names: The Belizean Bruiser
- Height: 5 ft 6 in (1.68 m)
- Weight: 135 lb (61 kg; 9 st 9 lb)
- Division: Bantamweight
- Reach: 68 in (173 cm)
- Style: Brazilian Jiu-Jitsu, Muay Thai
- Fighting out of: Visalia, California, United States
- Team: Trifecta MMA
- Rank: Black belt in Brazilian Jiu-Jitsu under Cleber Luciano; Light blue / dark blue belt in Muay Thai under Rafael Cordeiro
- Years active: 2010–2021

Mixed martial arts record
- Total: 18
- Wins: 9
- By knockout: 5
- By submission: 3
- By decision: 1
- Losses: 8
- By knockout: 1
- By decision: 7
- Draws: 1

Other information
- Occupation: High school teacher
- University: California State University Long Beach - degree in sports medicine
- Mixed martial arts record from Sherdog

Marion Reneau (born June 20, 1977) is an American retired professional mixed martial artist who competed as a Bantamweight in the Ultimate Fighting Championship.

== Mixed martial arts career ==
Reneau began her professional mixed martial arts career in 2010. After winning several professional fights she attempted to try out for The Ultimate Fighter 18. However, she was allegedly told by UFC brass that she was too old to be a contestant on the show, but to keep pressing on and to win a couple of more fights. On the heels of her submission victory over Maureen Riordan in July 2014 at Resurrection Fighting Alliance 16, she was signed by the UFC.

=== Ultimate Fighting Championship ===
Reneau faced Alexis Dufresne on January 3, 2015, at UFC 182. Reneau won the fight via unanimous decision. At the post fight press conference, Dana White made a point to mention the TUF snub and publicly praised her performance.

Reneau faced Jéssica Andrade on February 22, 2015, at UFC Fight Night 61 in Brazil. Reneau won the fight via first round submission, earning a Performance of the Night bonus.

Reneau faced Holly Holm on July 15, 2015, at UFC Fight Night 71. She lost the fight by unanimous decision.

Reneau faced Ashlee Evans-Smith on February 21, 2016, at UFC Fight Night: Cowboy vs. Cowboy. She lost the fight by a close split decision. The judges' decision was controversial as 16 of the 17 media sources scoring the fight scored it for Reneau. She planned to appeal the decision with the Pennsylvania State Athletic Commission. However, the appeal was denied by the PSAC.

Reneau faced Milana Dudieva on November 19, 2016, at UFC Fight Night 99 in Belfast, Northern Ireland. She won the bout by TKO in the third round.

Reneau then faced Bethe Correia on March 11, 2017, at UFC Fight Night: Belfort vs. Gastelum. The back-and-forth fight saw strong moments from both women, 2 of the 3 Judges gave the first two rounds to Correia (10-9) and gave the third round to Reneau (10-8) ultimately causing the fight to end in a majority draw. After the fight, Reneau disagreed with the result and said “I believe she won the first round; maybe she might’ve edged me out a little bit. I think I definitely won the second – and for sure I won the third round."

Reneau was expected to face former UFC Women's Featherweight Champion Germaine de Randamie on September 2, 2017, at UFC Fight Night: Struve vs. Volkov, however, De Randamie pulled out of the fight on August 25 citing injury and was replaced by Talita Bernardo Reneau won the fight via TKO in the closing seconds of the third round.

Reneau was scheduled to face former Invicta FC bantamweight champion Tonya Evinger at UFC Fight Night: Cowboy vs. Medeiros on February 18, 2018. However, on January 9, 2018, it was announced that Evinger was forced to pull out from the fight due to injury, resulting Reneau being pulled from the event and rescheduled to face Sara McMann on February 24, 2018, at UFC on Fox 28. After being dominated the first round, she rallied back in the second round by knocking McMann down and then submitting her.

Reneau faced Cat Zingano at UFC Fight Night 133 on July 14, 2018. She lost the fight by unanimous decision.

Reneau faced Yana Kunitskaya on March 9, 2019, at UFC Fight Night 146. She lost the fight by unanimous decision.

Reneau was scheduled to face Irene Aldana on September 21, 2019, at UFC on ESPN+ 17. However, Reneau pulled out of the bout on September 11 for undisclosed reasons. She was replaced by Vanessa Melo.

Reneau was scheduled to face Ketlen Vieira on May 9, 2020, at UFC 250. However, on April 9, Dana White, the president of UFC announced that this event was postponed to a future date. Instead Reneau faced Raquel Pennington on June 20, 2020, at UFC Fight Night: Blaydes vs. Volkov. She lost the fight via unanimous decision.

The bout with Vieira was rescheduled and was expected to take place on September 27, 2020, at UFC 253. However, Reneau was pull from the bout, citing undisloced injury and she was replaced by Sijara Eubanks

The bout between Reneau and Macy Chiasson was originally scheduled for UFC Fight Night: Overeem vs. Volkov. However, during the week leading up to the fight, Reneau was pulled from the card after testing positive for COVID-19. The bout was rescheduled for UFC Fight Night: Rozenstruik vs. Gane. However, yet again the bout was cancelled due to Reneau testing positive for COVID-19 and the bout eventually took place on March 20, 2021, at UFC on ESPN 21. Reneau lost the fight via unanimous decision.

Reneau faced former UFC Women's Bantamweight Champion Miesha Tate on July 17, 2021, at UFC on ESPN: Makhachev vs. Moisés, losing by TKO in the third round. This was the first time Reneau had been finished in her career. Reneau had announced her retirement before the bout, and confirmed as such after the fight.

== Personal life ==
Reneau grew up in Porterville, California. She is a graduate of California State University Long Beach with a degree in sports medicine, where she was a member of the track and field team, being named the Big West Women's Track & Field Athlete of the Year. She began training for the Olympics after college, however she was injured during a meet and later she became pregnant with her son and stopped her track career. She is currently married to Armando Perez Jr. She taught physical education at Farmersville High School for 17 years.

== Championships and Accomplishments ==
=== Mixed martial arts ===
- Ultimate Fighting Championship
  - Performance of the night (One time) vs. Jéssica Andrade
  - Tied (Ji Yeon Kim, Michelle Waterson-Gomez, Cynthia Calvillo & Istela Nunes) for the second longest losing streak in UFC Women's history (5) (behind Andrea Lee)

== Mixed martial arts record ==
Professional record breakdown
| 18 matches | 9 wins | 8 losses |
| By knockout | 5 | 1 |
| By submission | 3 | 0 |
| By decision | 1 | 7 |
| Draws | 1 | |

| Res. | Record | Opponent | Method | Event | Date | Round | Time | Location | Notes |
|---|---|---|---|---|---|---|---|---|---|
| Loss | 9–8–1 | Miesha Tate | TKO (punches) | UFC on ESPN: Makhachev vs. Moisés | July 17, 2021 | 3 | 1:53 | Las Vegas, Nevada, United States | |
| Loss | 9–7–1 | Macy Chiasson | Decision (unanimous) | UFC on ESPN: Brunson vs. Holland | March 20, 2021 | 3 | 5:00 | Las Vegas, Nevada, United States | |
| Loss | 9–6–1 | Raquel Pennington | Decision (unanimous) | UFC on ESPN: Blaydes vs. Volkov | June 20, 2020 | 3 | 5:00 | Las Vegas, Nevada, United States | |
| Loss | 9–5–1 | Yana Kunitskaya | Decision (unanimous) | UFC Fight Night: Lewis vs. dos Santos | March 9, 2019 | 3 | 5:00 | Wichita, Kansas, United States | |
| Loss | 9–4–1 | Cat Zingano | Decision (unanimous) | UFC Fight Night: dos Santos vs. Ivanov | July 14, 2018 | 3 | 5:00 | Boise, Idaho, United States | |
| Win | 9–3–1 | Sara McMann | Submission (triangle choke) | UFC on Fox: Emmett vs. Stephens | February 24, 2018 | 2 | 3:40 | Orlando, Florida, United States | |
| Win | 8–3–1 | Talita Bernardo | TKO (punches) | UFC Fight Night: Volkov vs. Struve | September 2, 2017 | 3 | 4:54 | Rotterdam, Netherlands | |
| Draw | 7–3–1 | Bethe Correia | Draw (majority) | UFC Fight Night: Belfort vs. Gastelum | March 11, 2017 | 3 | 5:00 | Fortaleza, Brazil | |
| Win | 7–3 | Milana Dudieva | TKO (punches and elbows) | UFC Fight Night: Mousasi vs. Hall 2 | November 19, 2016 | 3 | 3:03 | Belfast, Northern Ireland | |
| Loss | 6–3 | Ashlee Evans-Smith | Decision (split) | UFC Fight Night: Cowboy vs. Cowboy | February 21, 2016 | 3 | 5:00 | Pittsburgh, Pennsylvania, United States | |
| Loss | 6–2 | Holly Holm | Decision (unanimous) | UFC Fight Night: Mir vs. Duffee | July 15, 2015 | 3 | 5:00 | San Diego, California, United States | |
| Win | 6–1 | Jéssica Andrade | Submission (triangle choke) | UFC Fight Night: Bigfoot vs. Mir | February 22, 2015 | 1 | 1:54 | Porto Alegre, Brazil | Performance of the Night. |
| Win | 5–1 | Alexis Dufresne | Decision (unanimous) | UFC 182 | January 3, 2015 | 3 | 5:00 | Las Vegas, Nevada, United States | Catchweight (138 lb) bout; Dufresne missed weight. |
| Win | 4–1 | Maureen Riordon | Submission (armbar) | RFA 16 | July 25, 2014 | 1 | 4:15 | Broomfield, Colorado, United States | Bantamweight debut. |
| Win | 3–1 | Leslie Rodriguez | TKO (punches) | Tachi Palace Fights 17 | November 14, 2013 | 1 | 1:24 | Lemoore, California, United States | |
| Win | 2–1 | Lydia Reyes | KO (punch) | TWC 15 | October 26, 2012 | 1 | 0:10 | Porterville, California, United States | |
| Loss | 1–1 | Julia Avila | Decision (unanimous) | TWC 13 | January 27, 2012 | 3 | 5:00 | Porterville, California, United States | |
| Win | 1–0 | Chantalle Castellanos | TKO (punches) | TWC 13 | March 7, 2010 | 3 | 1:38 | Porterville, California, United States | |

== See also ==
- List of female mixed martial artists
