= UFC 289 =

Mixed martial arts event in 2023

UFC 289: Nunes vs. Aldana
- The poster for UFC 289: Nunes vs. Aldana
- Promotion: Ultimate Fighting Championship
- Date: June 10, 2023
- Venue: Rogers Arena
- City: Vancouver, British Columbia, Canada
- Attendance: 17,628
- Total gate: $3,834,893.25

Event chronology
UFC on ESPN: Kara-France vs. Albazi	UFC 289: Nunes vs. Aldana	UFC on ESPN: Vettori vs. Cannonier

UFC 289: Nunes vs. Aldana was a mixed martial arts event produced by the Ultimate Fighting Championship that took place on June 10, 2023, at Rogers Arena in Vancouver, British Columbia, Canada.

== Background ==
The event marked the promotion's 32nd overall visit to Canada and sixth to Vancouver, returning to the country for the first time since UFC Fight Night: Cowboy vs. Gaethje in September 2019.

A UFC Women's Bantamweight Championship trilogy bout between current two-time champion (also current UFC Women's Featherweight Champion) Amanda Nunes and former champion (also The Ultimate Fighter: Team Rousey vs. Team Tate bantamweight winner) Julianna Peña was expected to headline the event. However on May 2, Peña pulled out due to broken ribs and was replaced by Irene Aldana, who was scheduled to headline UFC Fight Night: Dern vs. Hill in a rematch against former title challenger Raquel Pennington. The latter served as a backup for the title bout.

A lightweight bout between former UFC Lightweight Champion Charles Oliveira and Beneil Dariush took place as the co-main event. They were originally booked at UFC 288, but Oliveira withdrew due to injury.

A middleweight bout between Chris Curtis and Nassourdine Imavov took place at the event. The two fighters were scheduled to face each other pre-UFC at ARES FC 2 in October 2020, but the event was canceled due to COVID-19 complications.

A welterweight bout between former UFC Welterweight Championship challenger Stephen Thompson and Michel Pereira was expected for this event. However, contracts were never signed and the bout is expected to take place at UFC 291 instead.

Matt Schnell and David Dvořák were scheduled to meet in a flyweight bout on the preliminary card. However, Schnell pulled out due to injury and was replaced by Stephen Erceg.

A featherweight bout between Hakeem Dawodu and Lucas Almeida was expected to take place at the event. However, the bout was scrapped for unknown reasons and Almeida was instead scheduled to face Pat Sabatini at UFC on ESPN: Vettori vs. Cannonier.

Chris Daukaus was expected to make his light heavyweight debut against Khalil Rountree Jr. at the event. However, Daukaus withdrew in early June due to injury. The bout was rescheduled for UFC on ESPN: Luque vs. dos Anjos.

== Results ==
Main card
Weight class				Method	Round	Time	Notes
Women's Bantamweight	Amanda Nunes (c)	def.	Irene Aldana	Decision (unanimous) (50–44, 50–44, 50–43)	5	5:00	(Note: For the UFC Women's Bantamweight Championship.)
Lightweight	Charles Oliveira	def.	Beneil Dariush	TKO (punches)	1	4:10
Welterweight	Mike Malott	def.	Adam Fugitt	Submission (guillotine choke)	2	1:06
Featherweight	Dan Ige	def.	Nate Landwehr	Decision (unanimous) (29–28, 29–28, 30–27)	3	5:00
Middleweight	Marc-André Barriault	def.	Eryk Anders	Decision (unanimous) (30–27, 30–27, 30–27)	3	5:00
Preliminary card (ESPN / ESPN+)
Middleweight	Nassourdine Imavov	vs.	Chris Curtis	No Contest (accidental clash of heads)	2	3:04	(Note: Accidental clash of heads rendered Curtis unable to continue.)
Women's Flyweight	Jasmine Jasudavicius	def.	Miranda Maverick	Decision (unanimous) (29–28, 29–28, 29–28)	3	5:00
Bantamweight	Aiemann Zahabi	def.	Aori Qileng	KO (punches)	1	1:04
Featherweight	Kyle Nelson	def.	Blake Bilder	Decision (unanimous) (30–27, 30–27, 29–28)	3	5:00
Early preliminary card (ESPN+ / UFC Fight Pass)
Flyweight	Steve Erceg	def.	David Dvořák	Decision (unanimous) (29–28, 29–28, 30–27)	3	5:00
Women's Strawweight	Diana Belbiţă	def.	Maria Oliveira	Decision (unanimous) (30–27, 30–27, 29–28)	3	5:00

== Bonus awards ==
The following fighters received $50,000 bonuses.

- Fight of the Night: Marc-André Barriault vs. Eryk Anders
- Performance of the Night: Charles Oliveira, Mike Malott, and Steve Erceg

== See also ==
- List of UFC events
- List of current UFC fighters
- 2023 in UFC
