= Sarah Moras =

Canadian mixed martial artist

- Born: Sarah Ashley Moras; 30 April 1988 (age 38); Sechelt, British Columbia, Canada
- Other names: Cheesecake
- Nationality: Canadian
- Height: 5 ft 7 in (1.70 m)
- Weight: 139 lb (63 kg; 9.9 st)
- Division: Bantamweight
- Reach: 67 in (170 cm)
- Fighting out of: Las Vegas, Nevada
- Team: Toshido Mixed Martial Arts; Xtreme Couture (2018–present)
- Rank: Brown belt in no-gi Brazilian Jiu-Jitsu
- Years active: 2010–present

Mixed martial arts record
- Total: 13
- Wins: 6
- By knockout: 3
- By submission: 2
- By decision: 1
- Losses: 7
- By knockout: 1
- By decision: 6

Other information
- Mixed martial arts record from Sherdog

Sarah Ashley Moras (born 30 April 1988) is a Canadian mixed martial artist who competes in the Bantamweight division. Moras fought in the Ultimate Fighting Championship (UFC) and she was a contestant on The Ultimate Fighter: Team Rousey vs. Team Tate. Prior to joining the UFC, Moras fought in Invicta FC.

== Mixed martial arts career ==
=== Early career ===
Moras made her professional MMA debut in May 2010. Before appearing on The Ultimate Fighter, she amassed a record of three wins and one loss in the first two years of her career.

=== The Ultimate Fighter ===
In August 2015, it was announced that Moras was selected as a participant on The Ultimate Fighter: Team Rousey vs. Team Tate, the first coed version of the show. In the elimination bout, Moras defeated Tara LaRosa after 2 rounds via decision to get into the TUF house. She then went on to defeat Peggy Morgan via submission in the first round to get into the semifinals. Sarah banked a 25K bonus for the TUF 18 Submission of the Season. In the semifinals, Moras lost to eventual winner Julianna Peña by submission in the second round.

=== Ultimate Fighting Championship ===
Moras made her official UFC debut against Alexis Dufresne on July 6, 2014, at The Ultimate Fighter 19 Finale. She won the fight via unanimous decision.

After a year away from the sport, Moras returned to face Jéssica Andrade at UFC Fight Night 71. She lost the fight by unanimous decision after almost submitting Andrade to a Hail Mary rear naked choke in the last minute of the last round.

Moras faced Ashlee Evans-Smith on September 9, 2017, at UFC 215. She won the fight via armbar submission, dislocating Evans-Smith's elbow in the first round.

Moras faced Lucie Pudilová on February 18, 2018, at UFC Fight Night: Cowboy vs. Medeiros. She lost the fight by unanimous decision.

Moras faced Talita Bernardo on October 27, 2018, at UFC Fight Night 138. She lost the fight via unanimous decision.

Moras was scheduled to face Leah Letson on May 4, 2019, at UFC Fight Night 151. However, Letson was removed from the fight in early April for an unspecified medical issue and replaced by Macy Chiasson. Moras lost the fight via TKO in the second round.

Moras faced Liana Jojua on September 7, 2019, at UFC 242. At the weigh-ins, Moras weighed in at 138 lbs, 2 pounds over the lightweight non-title fight limit of 136 lbs. She was fined 20% of her fight purse to Jojua, and the bout proceeded at catchweight. She won the fight via TKO in the third round.

Moras was scheduled to face Sijara Eubanks on April 18, 2020, at UFC 249. However, on April 9, Dana White, the president of UFC announced that this event was postponed and rescheduled to May 13, 2020, at UFC Fight Night: Smith vs. Teixeira. She lost the fight via unanimous decision.

Moras was scheduled to face Vanessa Melo on November 7, 2020, at UFC Fight Night 182. However, Moras tested positive for COVID-19 and the bout was postponed to take place at UFC on ABC: Holloway vs. Kattar on January 16, 2021. She lost the fight via unanimous decision.

On February 4, 2021, Moras was released from the UFC.

== Mixed martial arts record ==
Professional record breakdown
13 matches	6 wins	7 losses
By knockout	3	1
By submission	2	0
By decision	1	6

Res.	Record	Opponent	Method	Event	Date	Round	Time	Location	Notes
Loss	6–7	Vanessa Melo	Decision (unanimous)	UFC on ABC: Holloway vs. Kattar	January 16, 2021	3	5:00	Abu Dhabi, United Arab Emirates	
Loss	6–6	Sijara Eubanks	Decision (unanimous)	UFC Fight Night: Smith vs. Teixeira	May 13, 2020	3	5:00	Jacksonville, Florida, United States	
Win	6–5	Liana Jojua	TKO (punches and elbows)	UFC 242	September 7, 2019	3	2:26	Abu Dhabi, United Arab Emirates	Catchweight (138 lb) bout; Moras missed weight.
Loss	5–5	Macy Chiasson	TKO (punches)	UFC Fight Night: Iaquinta vs. Cowboy	May 4, 2019	2	2:22	Ottawa, Ontario, Canada	
Loss	5–4	Talita Bernardo	Decision (unanimous)	UFC Fight Night: Volkan vs. Smith	October 27, 2018	3	5:00	Moncton, New Brunswick, Canada	
Loss	5–3	Lucie Pudilová	Decision (unanimous)	UFC Fight Night: Cowboy vs. Medeiros	February 18, 2018	3	5:00	Austin, Texas, United States	
Win	5–2	Ashlee Evans-Smith	Submission (armbar)	UFC 215	September 9, 2017	1	2:51	Edmonton, Alberta, Canada	
Loss	4–2	Jéssica Andrade	Decision (unanimous)	UFC Fight Night: Mir vs. Duffee	July 15, 2015	3	5:00	San Diego, California, United States	
Win	4–1	Alexis Dufresne	Decision (unanimous)	The Ultimate Fighter: Team Edgar vs. Team Penn Finale	July 6, 2014	3	5:00	Las Vegas, Nevada, United States	Catchweight (143 lb) bout; Dufresne missed weight.
Win	3–1	Christina Barry	Technical Submission (armbar)	AFC 11: Takeover	September 15, 2012	1	1:33	Winnipeg, Manitoba, Canada	Catchweight (140 lb) bout.
Loss	2–1	Raquel Pennington	Decision (unanimous)	Invicta FC 2: Baszler vs. McMann	July 28, 2012	3	5:00	Kansas City, Kansas, United States	
Win	2–0	Julianna Peña	TKO (doctor stoppage)	Conquest of the Cage 11	April 19, 2012	2	5:00	Airway Heights, Washington, United States	
Win	1–0	Helena Martin	TKO (punches)	Cage Warriors 37	May 22, 2010	2	3:40	Birmingham, England	

=== Mixed martial arts exhibition record ===
Exhibition record breakdown		
3 matches	2 wins	1 loss
By submission	1	1
By decision	1	0

Res.	Record	Opponent	Method	Event	Date	Round	Time	Location	Notes
Loss	2–1	Julianna Peña	Submission (guillotine choke)	The Ultimate Fighter: Team Rousey vs. Team Tate	November 13, 2013 (air date)	2	3:31	Las Vegas, Nevada, United States	TUF 18 semi-finals round
Win	2–0	Peggy Morgan	Submission (armbar)	The Ultimate Fighter: Team Rousey vs. Team Tate	October 30, 2013 (air date)	1	4:39	Las Vegas, Nevada, United States	TUF 18 quarter-finals round
Win	1–0	Tara LaRosa	Decision (unanimous)	The Ultimate Fighter: Team Rousey vs. Team Tate	September 4, 2013 (air date)	2	5:00	Las Vegas, Nevada, United States	TUF 18 elimination round
