= UFC 215 =

UFC mixed martial arts event in 2017

UFC 215: Nunes vs. Shevchenko 2
- The poster for UFC 215: Nunes vs. Shevchenko 2
- Promotion: Ultimate Fighting Championship
- Date: September 9, 2017
- Venue: Rogers Place
- City: Edmonton, Alberta, Canada
- Attendance: 16,232
- Total gate: $2,028,307
- Buyrate: 100,000

Event chronology
UFC Fight Night: Volkov vs. Struve	UFC 215: Nunes vs. Shevchenko 2	UFC Fight Night: Rockhold vs. Branch

UFC 215: Nunes vs. Shevchenko 2 was a mixed martial arts event produced by the Ultimate Fighting Championship held on September 9, 2017, at Rogers Place in Edmonton, Alberta, Canada.

== Background ==
The promotion was initially planning a PPV event for August 19 at a venue to be in announced in the United States (presumably Seattle), possibly with UFC Flyweight Champion and Seattle-area resident Demetrious Johnson. However, those plans were nixed on June 26, though no exact reason was given. Therefore, an originally scheduled UFC 216 to be held at Rogers Place in Edmonton, Alberta, Canada, on September 9 was renamed as UFC 215.

While the UFC has hosted many events across Canada, the event was the first held in Edmonton (second in Alberta, after UFC 149 in 2012). Zuffa hosted a World Extreme Cagefighting event, WEC 49, at Rexall Place in Edmonton in June 2010.

A UFC Flyweight Championship bout between current champion Demetrious Johnson and Ray Borg was expected to serve as the event headliner. If successful in his title defense, Johnson would have become the UFC fighter with most title defenses of all time, with a total of eleven. In turn, the fight was canceled a day before the event, as Borg was forced to withdraw from the fight on Thursday evening due to illness. According to multiple sources, Borg was battling an illness and was deemed unfit to fight by UFC doctors. His illness was unrelated to his weight cut, sources say. The fight was later rescheduled for UFC 216 the following month.

A UFC Women's Bantamweight Championship bout between current champion Amanda Nunes and multiple-time Muay Thai world champion Valentina Shevchenko took place at this event. The pairing met previously in March 2016 at UFC 196, with Nunes winning by unanimous decision. The pairing was initially expected to meet again at UFC 213. However, the bout was canceled just hours before the event started as Nunes pulled out, citing an illness despite being medically cleared to fight. Due to the cancelation of the Johnson-Borg bout, this fight acted as the new main event.

A women's bantamweight bout between Sara McMann and Ketlen Vieira was expected to take place at UFC 214, but on July 7 it was announced that the bout was moved to this event.

Former UFC Heavyweight Champion Junior dos Santos was expected to face Francis Ngannou, but on August 18 it was announced that he was pulled from the card after being notified by USADA of a potential doping violation. He was flagged after an out-of-competition drug test conducted August 10. Dos Santos tested positive for hydrochlorothiazide and his team is currently working on testing supplements as a possible source for it. In turn, Ngannou was removed from the card after promotion officials deemed that a suitable opponent could not be arranged.

== Results ==
Main Card
Weight class				Method	Round	Time	Notes
Women's Bantamweight	Amanda Nunes (c)	def.	Valentina Shevchenko	Decision (split) (47–48, 48–47, 48–47)	5	5:00	(Note: For the UFC Women's Bantamweight Championship.)
Welterweight	Rafael dos Anjos	def.	Neil Magny	Submission (arm-triangle choke)	1	3:43
Flyweight	Henry Cejudo	def.	Wilson Reis	TKO (punches)	2	0:25
Light Heavyweight	Ilir Latifi	def.	Tyson Pedro	Decision (unanimous) (29–28, 29–28, 30–27)	3	5:00
Featherweight	Jeremy Stephens	def.	Gilbert Melendez	Decision (unanimous) (30–26, 30–26, 30–25)	3	5:00
Preliminary Card (Fox Sports 1)
Women's Bantamweight	Ketlen Vieira	def.	Sara McMann	Submission (arm-triangle choke)	2	4:16
Women's Bantamweight	Sarah Moras	def.	Ashlee Evans-Smith	Submission (armbar)	1	2:51
Featherweight	Ricky Glenn	def.	Gavin Tucker	Decision (unanimous) (30–25, 30–24, 29–27)	3	5:00
Lightweight	Alex White	def.	Mitch Clarke	TKO (punches)	2	4:36
Preliminary Card (UFC Fight Pass)
Heavyweight	Arjan Bhullar	def.	Luis Henrique	Decision (unanimous) (29–28, 29–28, 29–28)	3	5:00
Lightweight	Kajan Johnson	def.	Adriano Martins	KO (punch)	3	0:49

== Bonus awards ==
The following fighters were awarded $50,000 bonuses:

- Fight of the Night: Jeremy Stephens vs. Gilbert Melendez
- Performance of the Night: Rafael dos Anjos and Henry Cejudo

== See also ==
- List of UFC events
- 2017 in UFC
