= Irene Aldana =

Mexican mixed martial artist (born 1988)

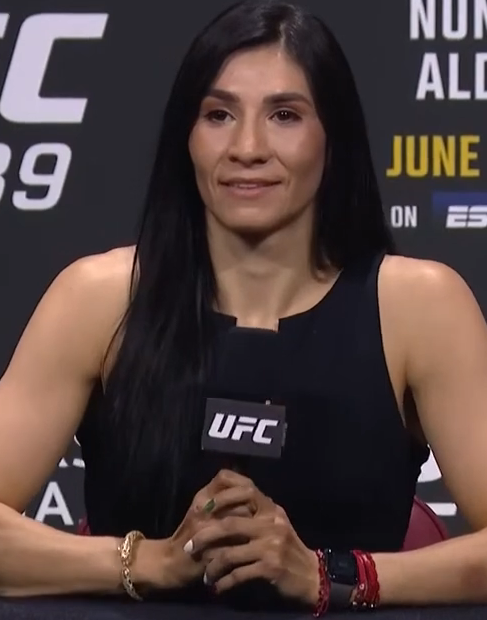
- Aldana in 2023
- Born: Irene Aldana Robles; March 26, 1988 (age 38); Culiacán, Sinaloa, Mexico
- Height: 5 ft 9 in (175 cm)
- Weight: 135 lb (61 kg; 9 st 9 lb)
- Division: Bantamweight
- Reach: 69 in (175 cm)
- Fighting out of: Guadalajara, Jalisco, Mexico
- Team: Lobo Gym MMA
- Trainer: Francisco Grasso
- Years active: 2012–2024

Mixed martial arts record
- Total: 23
- Wins: 15
- By knockout: 8
- By submission: 3
- By decision: 4
- Losses: 8
- By knockout: 2
- By decision: 6

Other information
- Mixed martial arts record from Sherdog

Irene Aldana Robles (born March 26, 1988) is a Mexican former professional mixed martial artist. She formerly competed in the women's Bantamweight division of the Ultimate Fighting Championship (UFC).

== Background ==
Aldana graduated from college at Guadalajara, Mexico with a degree in graphic design. During her college studies, she grew an interest in mixed martial arts and started training at local Lobo Gym in 2010.

== Mixed martial arts career ==
=== Jungle Fight ===
In her lone fight with Brazilian mixed martial arts promotion Jungle Fight, Aldana faced Larissa Pacheco for the vacant JF Women's Bantamweight Championship at JF: Jungle Fight 63 on December 21, 2013. She lost the fight via third-round TKO, giving her the first loss of her professional career.

=== Invicta Fighting Championships ===
Aldana signed with Invicta FC in mid-2014, and made her debut against Peggy Morgan at Invicta FC 8: Waterson vs. Tamada on September 9, 2014, submitting Morgan with a rear-naked choke in the first round.

She was then expected to face Marion Reneau at Invicta FC 10: Waterson vs. Tiburcio on December 5, 2014, but Aldana was forced out of the bout due to an illness and the fight was taken off the card.

Aldana was scheduled to face Melanie LaCroix at Invicta FC 11: Cyborg vs. Tweet on February 27, 2015, however, LaCroix withdrew from the bout for undisclosed reasons and was replaced by promotional newcomer Colleen Schneider. She won the fight via first round rear-naked choke.

=== Ultimate Fighting Championship ===
On November 6, 2016, it was announced that Aldana was signed to the UFC and would face Leslie Smith on December 17, 2016, at UFC on Fox 22. Aldana lost the fight by unanimous decision. Despite the loss, the bout earned Aldana her first Fight of the Night bonus award in the UFC.

Aldana faced Talita Bernardo on January 14, 2018, at UFC Fight Night: Stephens vs. Choi. Aldana won the fight via unanimous decision.

Aldana was scheduled to face Bethe Correia on August 4, 2018, at UFC 227; however, the bout was pulled when Correia withdrew due to injury. Instead, Aldana faced Lucie Pudilová on September 8, 2018, at UFC 228, winning a close fight via split decision and earning her and Pudilová Fight of the Night award.

Her bout with Bethe Correia was rescheduled and is expected to take place on May 11, 2019, at UFC 237. At the weigh-ins, Correia weighed in at 141 lbs, 5 pounds over the bantamweight limit of 136 lbs. She was fined 30% of her fight purse and the bout proceeded at catchweight. Aldana won the fight via submission in round three.

Aldana faced Raquel Pennington on July 20, 2019, at UFC on ESPN 4. Aldana lost the fight via split decision.

Aldana was scheduled to face Marion Reneau on September 21, 2019, at UFC on ESPN+ 17. However, Reneau pulled out of the bout on September 11 for undisclosed reasons. Reneau was replaced by promotional newcomer Vanessa Melo. At the weigh-ins, Melo weighed in at 140 pounds, 4 pounds over the bantamweight non-title fight limit of 136. She was fined 30% of her purse and her bout with Aldana proceeded at a catchweight. Aldana won the fight by unanimous decision.

Aldana faced Ketlen Vieira on December 14, 2019, at UFC 245. Aldana won the fight via knockout in round one. This win earned her the Performance of the Night award.

Aldana was scheduled to face Holly Holm on August 1, 2020, at UFC Fight Night 173. However, it was reported on July 22 that Aldana pulled out of the fight for undisclosed reasons. Mere hours after the news surfaced, Aldana revealed that the reason for withdrawal was testing positive for COVID-19. As a result, Holm was removed from the card as well and the pairing was left intact and rescheduled for October 4, 2020 at UFC on ESPN: Holm vs. Aldana. Aldana lost the fight via unanimous decision.

Aldana faced Yana Kunitskaya on July 10, 2021, at UFC 264. At the weigh-ins, Aldana weighed in at 139.5 pounds, three and a half pounds over the bantamweight non-title fight limit. Her bout proceeded at catchweight and she was fined 30% of her purse, which went go to her opponent Kunitskaya. Aldana won the fight via technical knockout in round one.

Aldana was next expected to face Germaine de Randamie at UFC 268 in New York, NY. However, de Randamie withdrew in early September due to injury.

Aldana was scheduled to face Aspen Ladd on April 9, 2022, at UFC 273. However, Aldana withdrew in late March for unknown reasons and was replaced by former UFC Women's Bantamweight Championship challenger Raquel Pennington.

Aldana faced Macy Chiasson on September 10, 2022, at UFC 279. She won the fight via knockout in the third round via an upkick to Chaisson's body. The win earned Aldana her second Performance of the Night bonus award.

Aldana was scheduled to headline UFC Fight Night 223 in a rematch with Raquel Pennington on May 20, 2023. On May 2, 2023, it was announced that Aldana would replace Julianna Peña in headlining UFC 289 on June 10, 2023, in a Bantamweight Championship match against champion Amanda Nunes. Aldana lost the bout via unanimous decision, after being dominated for all five rounds.

Aldana faced Karol Rosa on December 16, 2023, at UFC 296. She won the bout via unanimous decision. This fight earned them the Fight of the Night award. The two women set a single-fight women's bantamweight record for 349 significant strikes. Rosa also broke the record for most leg kicks landed in a single UFC bout with 95. The previous record was 76.

Aldana faced Norma Dumont on September 14, 2024, at UFC 306. She lost the fight by unanimous decision.

On July 17, 2026, it was reported that Aldana had retired from mixed martial arts.

== Championships and accomplishments ==
- Ultimate Fighting Championship
  - Fight of the Night (Three times) vs. Leslie Smith, Lucie Pudilová and Karol Rosa
  - Performance of the Night (Two times) vs. Ketlen Vieira and Macy Chiasson
    - Tied (Amanda Nunes) for third most Post-Fight bonuses in UFC Women's Bantamweight division history (4)
  - Second most total fight time in UFC Women's Bantamweight division history (3:12:50)
  - Second most significant strikes landed in UFC Women's Bantamweight division history (1028)
  - Third most total strikes landed in UFC Women's Bantamweight division history (1174)
  - UFC.com Awards
    - 2023: Ranked #3 Fight of the Year vs. Karol Rosa
- Invicta Fighting Championships
  - Performance of the Night (three times) vs. Peggy Morgan, Colleen Schneider, and Faith Van Duin
- MMA Junkie
  - 2019 December Knockout of the Month vs. Ketlen Vieira
- MMA Fighting
  - 2023 Second Team MMA All-Star
- Bleacher Report
  - 2023 #5 Ranked UFC Fight of the Year vs. Karol Rosa at UFC 296

== Mixed martial arts record ==
Professional record breakdown
23 matches	15 wins	8 losses
By knockout	8	2
By submission	3	0
By decision	4	6

Res.	Record	Opponent	Method	Event	Date	Round	Time	Location	Notes
Loss	15–8	Norma Dumont	Decision (unanimous)	UFC 306	September 14, 2024	3	5:00	Las Vegas, Nevada, United States	
Win	15–7	Karol Rosa	Decision (unanimous)	UFC 296	December 16, 2023	3	5:00	Las Vegas, Nevada, United States	Fight of the Night.
Loss	14–7	Amanda Nunes	Decision (unanimous)	UFC 289	June 10, 2023	5	5:00	Vancouver, British Columbia, Canada	For the UFC Women's Bantamweight Championship.
Win	14–6	Macy Chiasson	KO (upkick to the body)	UFC 279	September 10, 2022	3	2:21	Las Vegas, Nevada, United States	Catchweight (140 lb) bout. Performance of the Night.
Win	13–6	Yana Kunitskaya	TKO (punches)	UFC 264	July 10, 2021	1	4:35	Las Vegas, Nevada, United States	Catchweight (139.5 lb) bout; Aldana missed weight.
Loss	12–6	Holly Holm	Decision (unanimous)	UFC on ESPN: Holm vs. Aldana	October 4, 2020	5	5:00	Abu Dhabi, United Arab Emirates	
Win	12–5	Ketlen Vieira	KO (punches)	UFC 245	December 14, 2019	1	4:51	Las Vegas, Nevada, United States	Performance of the Night.
Win	11–5	Vanessa Melo	Decision (unanimous)	UFC Fight Night: Rodríguez vs. Stephens	September 21, 2019	3	5:00	Mexico City, Mexico	Catchweight (140 lb) bout; Melo missed weight.
Loss	10–5	Raquel Pennington	Decision (split)	UFC on ESPN: dos Anjos vs. Edwards	July 20, 2019	3	5:00	San Antonio, Texas, United States	
Win	10–4	Bethe Correia	Submission (armbar)	UFC 237	May 11, 2019	3	3:24	Rio de Janeiro, Brazil	Catchweight (141 lb) bout; Correia missed weight.
Win	9–4	Lucie Pudilová	Decision (split)	UFC 228	September 8, 2018	3	5:00	Dallas, Texas, United States	Fight of the Night.
Win	8–4	Talita Bernardo	Decision (unanimous)	UFC Fight Night: Stephens vs. Choi	January 14, 2018	3	5:00	St. Louis, Missouri, United States	
Loss	7–4	Katlyn Chookagian	Decision (split)	UFC 210	April 8, 2017	3	5:00	Buffalo, New York, United States	
Loss	7–3	Leslie Smith	Decision (unanimous)	UFC on Fox: VanZant vs. Waterson	December 17, 2016	3	5:00	Sacramento, California, United States	Fight of the Night.
Win	7–2	Faith Van Duin	TKO (punches)	Invicta FC 19: Maia vs. Modafferi	September 23, 2016	1	4:57	Kansas City, Missouri, United States	Performance of the Night.
Win	6–2	Jessamyn Duke	TKO (punches)	Invicta FC 16: Hamasaki vs. Brown	March 11, 2016	1	3:08	Las Vegas, Nevada, United States	Catchweight (136.6 lb) bout; Aldana missed weight.
Loss	5–2	Tonya Evinger	TKO (punches)	Invicta FC 13: Cyborg vs. Van Duin	July 9, 2015	4	4:38	Las Vegas, Nevada, United States	For the vacant Invicta FC Bantamweight Championship.
Win	5–1	Colleen Schneider	Submission (rear-naked choke)	Invicta FC 11: Cyborg vs. Tweet	February 27, 2015	1	1:05	Los Angeles, California, United States	Performance of the Night.
Win	4–1	Peggy Morgan	Submission (rear-naked choke)	Invicta FC 8: Waterson vs. Tamada	September 9, 2014	1	2:50	Kansas City, Missouri, United States	Performance of the Night.
Loss	3–1	Larissa Pacheco	TKO (punches)	Jungle Fight 63	December 21, 2013	3	1:50	Belém, Brazil	For the vacant Jungle Fight Women's Bantamweight Championship.
Win	3–0	Mayra Arce	KO (spinning wheel kick and punches)	Xtreme Kombat 21	October 12, 2013	1	0:43	Mexico City, Mexico	
Win	2–0	Flor Saenz	TKO (knee to the body)	Xtreme Kombat 21	October 12, 2013	1	0:20	Mexico City, Mexico	
Win	1–0	Sandra del Rincon	KO (knees and punches)	GEX: Old Jack's Fight Night	October 17, 2012	1	0:15	Zapopan, Mexico	

== Pay-per-view bouts ==
No	Event	Fight	Date	Venue	City	PPV buys
1.	UFC 289	Nunes vs. Aldana	June 10, 2023	Rogers Arena	Vancouver, British Columbia, Canada	Not Disclosed

== See also ==
- List of female mixed martial artists
- List of Mexican UFC fighters
