= Raquel Pennington =

American mixed martial artist (born 1988)

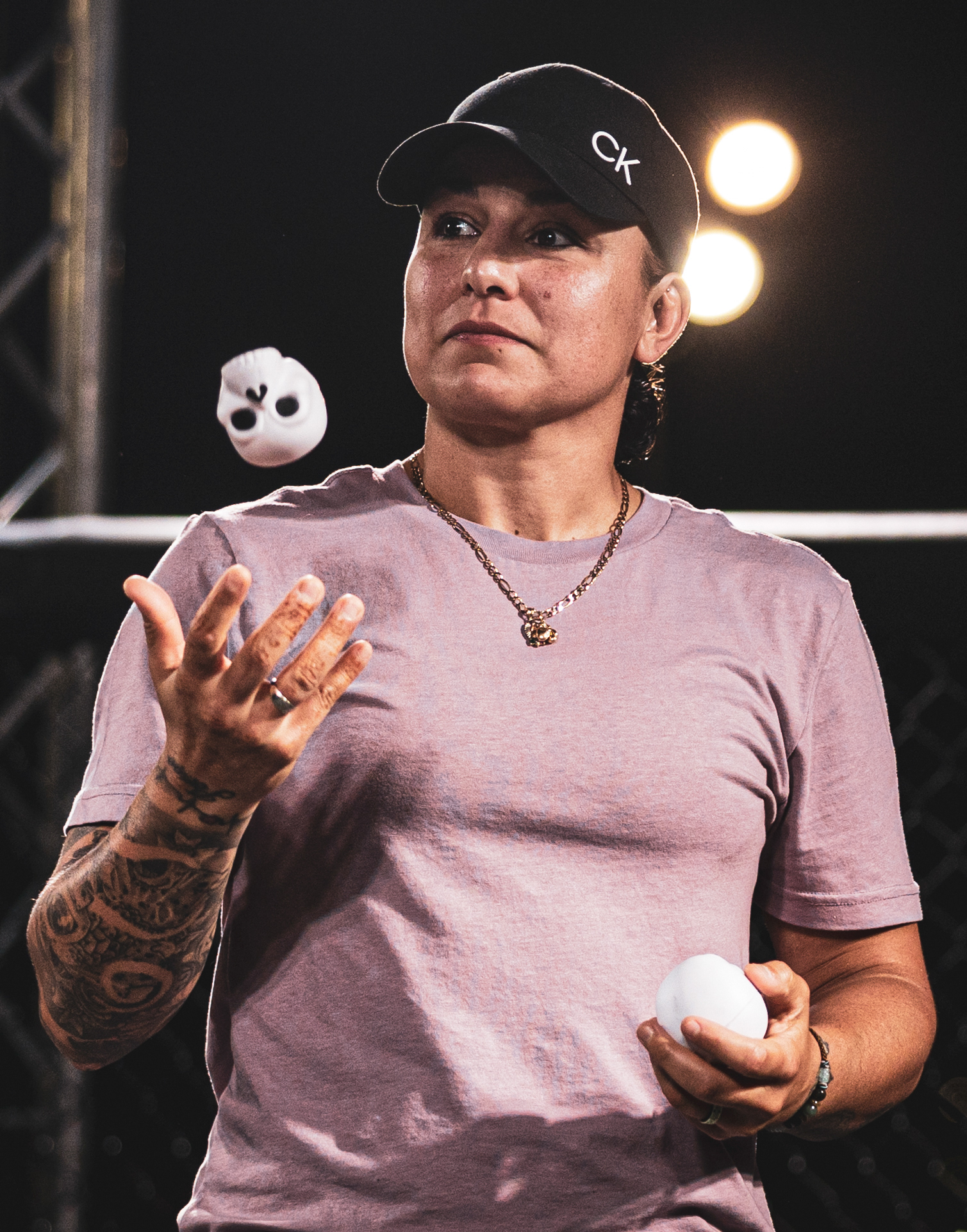
- Pennington in 2024
- Born: Raquel Len Pennington; September 5, 1988 (age 38); Colorado Springs, Colorado, U.S.
- Other names: Rocky
- Height: 5 ft 7 in (1.70 m)
- Weight: 135 lb (61 kg; 9.6 st)
- Division: Bantamweight (2012–present); Featherweight (2021)
- Reach: 67 1/2 in (171 cm)
- Fighting out of: Colorado Springs, Colorado, U.S.
- Team: Altitude MMA
- Rank: Brown belt in Brazilian Jiu-Jitsu under Tyler Larsen
- Years active: 2009–present

Mixed martial arts record
- Total: 25
- Wins: 16
- By knockout: 1
- By submission: 4
- By decision: 11
- Losses: 9
- By knockout: 1
- By submission: 1
- By decision: 7

Amateur record
- Total: 8
- Wins: 7
- By submission: 5
- By decision: 2
- Losses: 1
- By decision: 1

Other information
- Spouse: Tecia Torres (m. 2022)
- Mixed martial arts record from Sherdog

Raquel Len Pennington (born September 5, 1988) is an American professional mixed martial artist who competed in the women's Bantamweight division of the Ultimate Fighting Championship (UFC), where she is a former UFC Women's Bantamweight Champion.

== Early life ==
Pennington grew up playing many sports from basketball, softball, volleyball, running cross country and always wanted to box. She graduated from Harrison High School in 2007 as secretary of the National Honors Society, with many athletic and academic scholarships. She never played sports on a collegiate level due to a broken back.

== Mixed martial arts career ==
=== Early career ===
Pennington started training in martial arts at the age of 19, though initially her parents would not let her fight. She fought in amateur MMA from 2009 to 2011, amassing a record of 7 wins and 1 loss with five of those wins by submission. Her professional debut was in March 2012, a TKO victory against Kim Couture.

=== Invicta Fighting Championships ===
Pennington made her Invicta Fighting Championships promotional debut against future The Ultimate Fighter teammate Sarah Moras on July 28, 2012, at Invicta FC 2. She won via unanimous decision.

Her next two fights for the promotion were both losses; one to Cat Zingano at Invicta FC 3 and one to Leslie Smith at Invicta FC 4.

=== The Ultimate Fighter ===
In August 2013, Pennington was announced as a cast member of The Ultimate Fighter: Team Rousey vs. Team Tate. She defeated veteran Tonya Evinger via submission due to a guillotine choke in the second round and was the third female pick of Team Tate.

Raquel Pennington faced Jessamyn Duke in the elimination round. Pennington defeated Duke via unanimous decision (29–28, 29–28, and 29–28) and the performance earned both participants Fight of The Season honors.

Advancing to the semi-final, Pennington next faced former boxing champion Jessica Rakoczy in the final episode of the series. Prior to the fight, Pennington damaged her hand but was still able to fight. She lost a unanimous decision to Rakoczy (30–27, 30–27, and 30–27).

=== Ultimate Fighting Championship ===
Pennington made her promotional debut against TUF 18 teammate Roxanne Modafferi on November 30, 2013, at The Ultimate Fighter 18 Finale. She won via unanimous decision (30–27, 30–27, and 29–28).

For her second fight with the promotion, Pennington replaced an injured Julianna Peña against Jéssica Andrade on March 15, 2014, at UFC 171. She lost the back-and-forth fight via split decision.

Pennington was scheduled to face Holly Holm at UFC 181 on December 6, 2014. However, Holm pulled out of the fight in mid-November, citing a neck injury. Holm was replaced by UFC newcomer Ashlee Evans-Smith. Pennington won the fight via technical submission due to a bulldog choke at the end of the first round. She became the 4th fighter in UFC history to finish a fight with that move.

Pennington fought Holly Holm at UFC 184 on February 28, 2015, a bout that was originally supposed to take place at UFC 181. She lost the fight via split decision.

Pennington was set to take on Liz Carmouche at UFC 191. Carmouche was then replaced by former opponent Jéssica Andrade. Pennington won the rematch by submission in the second round. The submission earned her a Performance of the Night bonus.

Pennington faced former UFC Bantamweight Champion and former TUF Coach Miesha Tate at UFC 205 on November 12, 2016. She won the fight by unanimous decision (29–28, 30–27, and 30–27), outstriking and outwrestling Tate for all three rounds.

After being away from fighting for about a year and a half, Pennington faced Amanda Nunes on May 12, 2018, at UFC 224 in a UFC Women's Bantamweight Championship bout. Pennington lost the fight via TKO in the fifth round. This was the first event in UFC history to be headlined by two openly gay fighters.

Pennington returned at UFC Fight Night 139 on November 10, 2018, where she took on former UFC featherweight champ Germaine de Randamie. She lost the fight via unanimous decision.

Pennington faced Irene Aldana on July 20, 2019, at UFC on ESPN 4. She won the fight via split decision.

Pennington was scheduled to face Holly Holm in a rematch on October 6, 2019, at UFC 243. However, on September 27, it was revealed Holm withdrew from the bout due to a hamstring injury and the bout was cancelled. The pair was rescheduled to fight on January 18, 2020, at UFC 246. She lost the fight via unanimous decision.

Pennington faced Marion Reneau on June 20, 2020, at UFC Fight Night: Blaydes vs. Volkov. She won the fight via unanimous decision.

Pennington accepted a six-month USADA suspension after self-reporting a doping violation upon realizing she had ingested banned substances, 7-Keto-DHEA and AOD-9064, prescribed by her doctor to treat a medical condition. The suspension was retroactive to November 17, 2020, and she would be eligible to fight again on May 7, 2021.

Pennington faced Pannie Kianzad on September 18, 2021, at UFC Fight Night 192. She won the fight via unanimous decision.

Pennington was scheduled to face Julia Avila on December 18, 2021, at UFC Fight Night 199. However, Avila was forced to pull from the event due to injury. She was replaced by Macy Chiasson. At the weigh-ins, Chiasson weighed in at 148.5 pounds, 3.5 pounds over the women's featherweight non-title fight limit. The bout proceeded at a catchweight with Chiasson fined a percentage of her purse, which went to Pennington. Pennington won the fight via guillotine submission in the second round.

Pennington faced Aspen Ladd, replacing Irene Aldana, on April 9, 2022, at UFC 273. She won the bout via unanimous decision.

Pennington faced Ketlen Vieira on January 14, 2023, at UFC Fight Night 217. She won the fight via split decision.

Pennington was scheduled to rematch Irene Aldana on May 20, 2023, at UFC Fight Night 223. However, on May 2, 2023, it was announced that Aldana would instead replace an injured Julianna Peña in headlining UFC 289 on June 10, 2023, in a Bantamweight Championship match against champion Amanda Nunes. A few days later it was announced that Pennington would serve as a backup for the title bout.

==== UFC Women's Bantamweight Champion ====
Pennington faced Mayra Bueno Silva on January 20, 2024, at UFC 297 for the vacant UFC Women's Bantamweight Championship. She won the fight via unanimous decision.

Pennington faced former UFC Bantamweight champion Julianna Peña on October 5, 2024, at UFC 307. She lost the championship by split decision. 25 out of 26 media outlets scored the bout for Pennington and one scored it as a draw.

==== Post championship ====
Pennington was scheduled to face Norma Dumont on September 13, 2025, at UFC Fight Night 259. However, Pennington had to withdraw due to an undisclosed injury and a replacement was not found.

== Personal life ==
Pennington is openly lesbian. She is married to UFC Strawweight Tecia Torres. The couple announced the birth of their baby daughter in June 2023. She is half Mexican and half Caucasian.

== Championships and accomplishments ==
- Ultimate Fighting Championship
  - UFC Women's Bantamweight Championship (One time)
  - The Ultimate Fighter 18 Fight of the Season vs. Jessamyn Duke
  - Performance of the Night (One time) vs. Jéssica Andrade
  - Most bouts in UFC Women's Bantamweight division history (18)
  - Most total fight time in UFC Women's Bantamweight division history (4:42:33)
    - Second longest average fight time in UFC Women's Bantamweight division history (15:42) (behind Valentina Shevchenko)
  - Second most wins in UFC Women's Bantamweight division history (12) (behind Amanda Nunes)
  - Most significant strikes landed in UFC Women's Bantamweight division history (1148)
  - Most total strikes landed in UFC Women's Bantamweight division history (1687)
  - Tied (Miesha Tate) for fourth longest win streak in UFC Women's Bantamweight division history (5)
  - Second most control time in UFC Women's Bantamweight division history (1:05:12)
  - Third highest significant strike defense in UFC Women's Bantamweight division history (60.8%)
  - Second most submission attempts in UFC Women's Bantamweight division history (11) (behind Miesha Tate)
  - Most decision wins in UFC Women's Bantamweight division history (10)
    - Most decision bouts in UFC Women's Bantamweight division history (14)
    - Most unanimous decision wins in UFC Women's Bantamweight division history (7)
    - Tied (Ketlen Vieira) for most split decision wins in UFC Women's Bantamweight division history (3)
  - UFC.com Awards
    - 2014: Ranked #7 Submission of the Year vs. Ashlee Evans-Smith
- MMA Fighting
  - 2024 Third Team MMA All-Star

== Mixed martial arts record ==
Professional record breakdown
25 matches	16 wins	9 losses
By knockout	1	1
By submission	4	1
By decision	11	7

Res.	Record	Opponent	Method	Event	Date	Round	Time	Location	Notes
Loss	16–9	Julianna Peña	Decision (split)	UFC 307	October 5, 2024	5	5:00	Salt Lake City, Utah, United States	Lost the UFC Women's Bantamweight Championship.
Win	16–8	Mayra Bueno Silva	Decision (unanimous)	UFC 297	January 20, 2024	5	5:00	Toronto, Ontario, Canada	Won the vacant UFC Women's Bantamweight Championship.
Win	15–8	Ketlen Vieira	Decision (split)	UFC Fight Night: Strickland vs. Imavov	January 14, 2023	3	5:00	Las Vegas, Nevada, United States	
Win	14–8	Aspen Ladd	Decision (unanimous)	UFC 273	April 9, 2022	3	5:00	Jacksonville, Florida, United States	Return to Bantamweight.
Win	13–8	Macy Chiasson	Submission (guillotine choke)	UFC Fight Night: Lewis vs. Daukaus	December 18, 2021	2	3:07	Las Vegas, Nevada, United States	Featherweight debut; Chiasson missed weight (148.5 lb).
Win	12–8	Pannie Kianzad	Decision (unanimous)	UFC Fight Night: Smith vs. Spann	September 18, 2021	3	5:00	Las Vegas, Nevada, United States	
Win	11–8	Marion Reneau	Decision (unanimous)	UFC on ESPN: Blaydes vs. Volkov	June 20, 2020	3	5:00	Las Vegas, Nevada, United States	
Loss	10–8	Holly Holm	Decision (unanimous)	UFC 246	January 18, 2020	3	5:00	Las Vegas, Nevada, United States	
Win	10–7	Irene Aldana	Decision (split)	UFC on ESPN: dos Anjos vs. Edwards	July 20, 2019	3	5:00	San Antonio, Texas, United States	
Loss	9–7	Germaine de Randamie	Decision (unanimous)	UFC Fight Night: The Korean Zombie vs. Rodríguez	November 10, 2018	3	5:00	Denver, Colorado, United States	Catchweight (138 lb) bout; Pennington missed weight.
Loss	9–6	Amanda Nunes	TKO (punches)	UFC 224	May 12, 2018	5	2:36	Rio de Janeiro, Brazil	For the UFC Women's Bantamweight Championship.
Win	9–5	Miesha Tate	Decision (unanimous)	UFC 205	November 12, 2016	3	5:00	New York City, New York, United States	
Win	8–5	Elizabeth Phillips	Decision (unanimous)	UFC 202	August 20, 2016	3	5:00	Las Vegas, Nevada, United States	
Win	7–5	Bethe Correia	Decision (split)	UFC on Fox: Teixeira vs. Evans	April 16, 2016	3	5:00	Tampa, Florida, United States	
Win	6–5	Jéssica Andrade	Submission (rear-naked choke)	UFC 191	September 5, 2015	2	4:58	Las Vegas, Nevada, United States	Performance of the Night.
Loss	5–5	Holly Holm	Decision (split)	UFC 184	February 28, 2015	3	5:00	Los Angeles, California, United States	
Win	5–4	Ashlee Evans-Smith	Technical Submission (bulldog choke)	UFC 181	December 6, 2014	1	4:59	Las Vegas, Nevada, United States	
Loss	4–4	Jéssica Andrade	Decision (split)	UFC 171	March 15, 2014	3	5:00	Dallas, Texas, United States	
Win	4–3	Roxanne Modafferi	Decision (unanimous)	The Ultimate Fighter: Team Rousey vs. Team Tate Finale	November 30, 2013	3	5:00	Las Vegas, Nevada, United States	
Loss	3–3	Leslie Smith	Decision (unanimous)	Invicta FC 4	January 5, 2013	3	5:00	Kansas City, Kansas, United States	
Loss	3–2	Cat Zingano	Submission (rear-naked choke)	Invicta FC 3	October 6, 2012	2	3:32	Kansas City, Kansas, United States	
Win	3–1	Raquel Pa'aluhi	Submission (guillotine choke)	Destiny MMA: Na Koa 1	September 8, 2012	1	3:52	Honolulu, Hawaii, United States	Won the Destiny MMA Bantamweight Championship.
Win	2–1	Sarah Moras	Decision (unanimous)	Invicta FC 2	July 28, 2012	3	5:00	Kansas City, Kansas, United States	
Loss	1–1	Tori Adams	Decision (unanimous)	Rocky Mountain Bad Boyz: A Champion's Quest	June 22, 2012	3	5:00	Sheridan, Colorado, United States	Bantamweight debut.
Win	1–0	Kim Couture	TKO (knees to the body)	Medieval Fight Productions: Vengeance	March 13, 2012	2	2:25	Casper, Wyoming, United States	Flyweight debut.

Exhibition record breakdown		
3 matches	2 wins	1 loss
By submission	1	0
By decision	1	1

Res.	Record	Opponent	Method	Event	Date	Round	Time	Location	Notes
Loss	2–1	Jessica Rakoczy	Decision (unanimous)	The Ultimate Fighter: Team Rousey vs. Team Tate	November 27, 2013	3	5:00	Las Vegas, Nevada, United States	The Ultimate Fighter 18 Semifinal bout.
Win	2–0	Jessamyn Duke	Decision (unanimous)	The Ultimate Fighter: Team Rousey vs. Team Tate	October 9, 2013	3	5:00	Las Vegas, Nevada, United States	The Ultimate Fighter 18 Quarterfinal bout.
Win	1–0	Tonya Evinger	Submission (guillotine choke)	The Ultimate Fighter: Team Rousey vs. Team Tate	September 4, 2013	2	3:56	Las Vegas, Nevada, United States	The Ultimate Fighter 18 Preliminary bout.

Amateur record breakdown		
8 matches	7 wins	1 loss
By submission	5	0
By decision	2	1

Res.	Record	Opponent	Method	Event	Date	Round	Time	Location	Notes
Win	7–1	Heather Denny	Submission (triangle choke)	RMBB: Extreme MMA	August 12, 2011	2	1:59	Sheridan, Colorado, United States	
Win	6–1	J.J. Aldrich	Submission (triangle choke)	RMBB: Bad Girlz Gone Wild	January 21, 2011	2	1:44	Sheridan, Colorado, United States	
Loss	5–1	Taylor Stratford	Decision (split)	URC 13: Brute Force	June 11, 2010	3	3:00	Reno, Nevada, United States	
Win	5–0	Tsui-Jen Cunanan	Decision (unanimous)	RMBB: Caged Madness	January 16, 2010	3	3:00	Sheridan, Colorado, United States	
Win	4–0	Kyane Hampton	Submission (rear-naked choke)	NMEF: Annihilation 20	October 24, 2009	2	0:45	Greeley, Colorado, United States	
Win	3–0	Kyane Hampton	Submission (rear-naked choke)	Kickdown 67: Blast	June 20, 2009	1	2:52	Denver, Colorado, United States	
Win	2–0	Ericka Trujillo	Decision (unanimous)	Kickdown 62: Extreme	April 5, 2009	3	3:00	Casper, Wyoming, United States	
Win	1–0	Staci Vega	Submission (guillotine choke)	Kickdown 60: Supremacy	February 21, 2009	1	1:45	Casper, Wyoming, United States	

== Pay-per-view bouts ==
No.	Event	Fight	Date	Venue	City	PPV Buys
1.	UFC 224	Nunes vs. Pennington	March 3, 2018	Jeunesse Arena	Rio de Janeiro, Brazil	85,000

== See also ==
- List of female mixed martial artists

Awards and achievements
Vacant Title last held by Amanda Nunes	7th UFC Bantamweight Champion; January 20, 2024 – October 5, 2024	Succeeded by Julianna Peña
