= Cat Zingano =

American mixed martial arts fighter

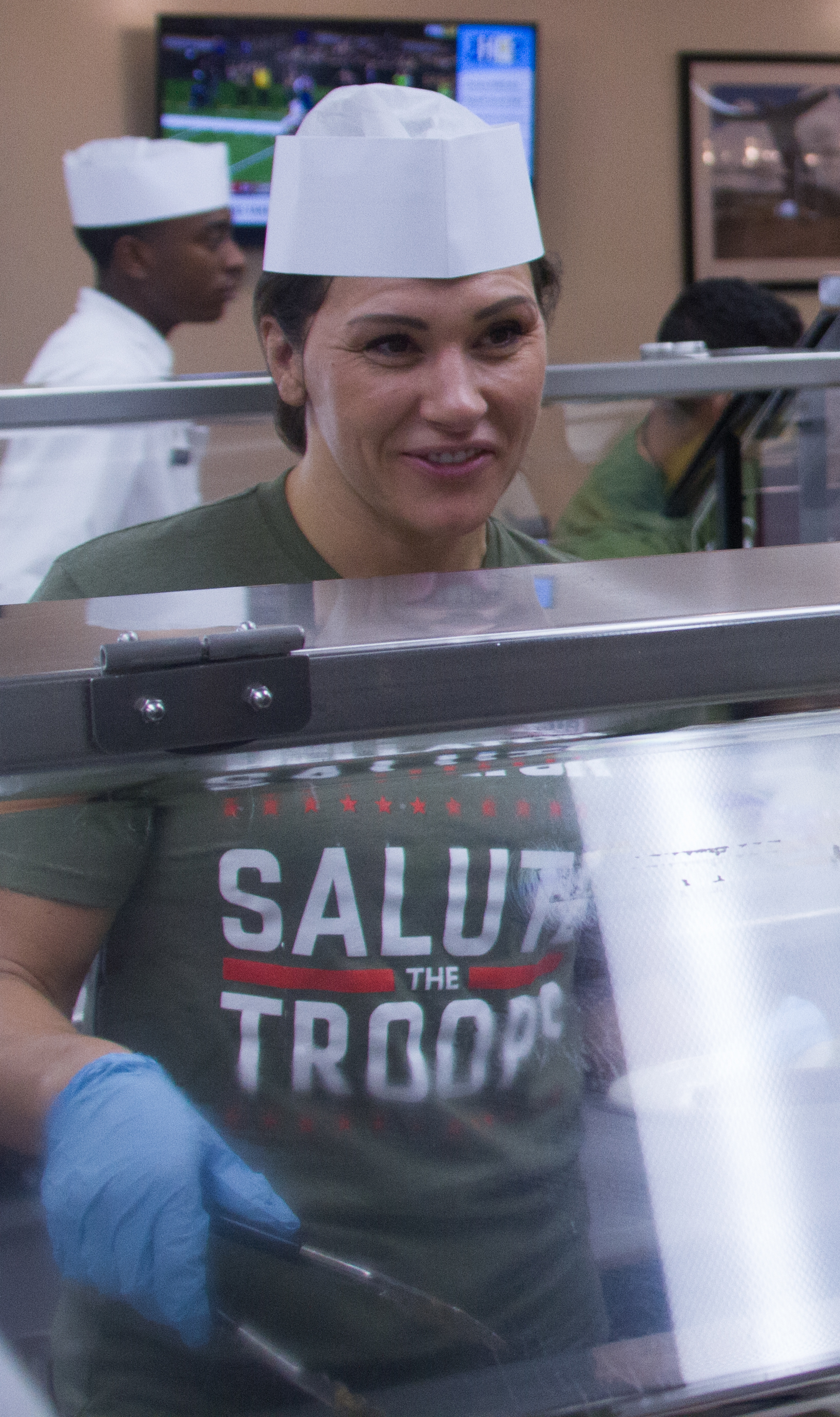
- Zingano serves food at Schofield Barracks in 2019
- Born: July 1, 1982 (age 44); Winona, Minnesota, U.S.
- Other names: Alpha
- Height: 5 ft 6 in (1.68 m)
- Weight: 145 lb (66 kg; 10 st 5 lb)
- Division: Flyweight; Bantamweight; Featherweight
- Reach: 68 in (173 cm)
- Fighting out of: Denver, Colorado, U.S.
- Team: Black House; Alliance MMA
- Rank: Black belt in Brazilian Jiu-Jitsu
- Wrestling: NCAA Division III Wrestling

Mixed martial arts record
- Total: 19
- Wins: 14
- By knockout: 5
- By submission: 4
- By decision: 5
- Losses: 5
- By knockout: 2
- By submission: 1
- By decision: 2

Other information
- Mixed martial arts record from Sherdog

Cat Zingano (née Albert; born July 1, 1982) is an American mixed martial artist, currently signed to the GFL, competing in the Women's Featherweight division. Zingano also competed for the Ultimate Fighting Championship (UFC), and Bellator MMA. on April 13, 2013, she became the first woman to win a UFC fight by technical knockout (TKO). At the time of her departure from the UFC, she was No. 7 in the official UFC bantamweight rankings.

== Early life ==
Zingano began her career in combat sports with wrestling at age 12. She attended Fairview High School in Boulder, Colorado, where she got involved with combat sports after joining the wrestling team. She eventually became part of both the University of the Cumberlands (2001) and MacMurray College women's wrestling teams and became a 4-time All-American and National Champion.

In 2007, Zingano discovered Brazilian jiu-jitsu (BJJ), shortly after she started to compete and won many tournaments including the World Championships (Mundials) in Los Angeles, and the Rio de Janeiro State Championships in Brazil, along with several State titles in Colorado.

In October 2007, after doing a few months of Brazilian Jiu-Jitsu, Zingano competed in her first amateur Mixed Martial Arts fight and instantly knew that MMA was something she wanted to compete in.

== Mixed martial arts career ==
=== Early career ===
Zingano made her pro MMA debut on June 13, 2008, at Ring of Fire 32, and submitted Karina Taylor with an armbar in the first round.

On December 10, 2010, Zingano faced Carina Damm at Crowbar MMA: Winter Brawl in Grand Forks, North Dakota. She defeated Damm by TKO in the second round.

Zingano next faced Takayo Hashi at Fight To Win: Outlaws on May 14, 2011. She defeated Hashi via knockout from a slam in the third round.

=== Invicta FC and Strikeforce ===
Zingano was scheduled to face Anita Rodriguez at Invicta Fighting Championships 1, but she was forced to withdraw from the card due to an injury.

Zingano had signed on to face Amanda Nunes at Strikeforce: Melendez vs. Healy on September 29, 2012, but the event was cancelled when Gilbert Melendez, who was set to defend his title against Pat Healy, sustained a knee injury in training that forced his withdrawal from the card.

Zingano instead faced Raquel Pennington at Invicta FC 3: Penne vs Sugiyama on October 6, 2012. She defeated Pennington by submission due to a rear-naked choke in the second round.

=== Ultimate Fighting Championship ===
In February 2013, it was revealed that Zingano would participate in the second women's match in Ultimate Fighting Championship (UFC) history. She fought Miesha Tate on April 13, 2013, at The Ultimate Fighter 17 Finale. Zingano defeated Tate by TKO in the third round. The bout was named Fight of the Night.

As the winner of the bout, Zingano was set to become a coach on The Ultimate Fighter 18 against Ronda Rousey and be the next challenger for the UFC Women's Bantamweight Championship. However, on May 28, it was announced that Zingano was out as coach/opponent for Rousey after she had suffered a knee injury earlier in the month which required surgery and had been replaced by Tate. On October 3, 2013, Zingano underwent PRP (Platelet-rich plasma) and stem cell treatment on both of her knees.

After nearly a year and a half away from the sport due to injury, Zingano returned to the Octagon in the fall of 2014. She faced Amanda Nunes on September 27, 2014, at UFC 178. After losing the first round, Zingano came back in the two subsequent rounds to win via TKO in the third round. After the fight she said "That whole first round, I just got my head caved in, I was dizzy; I couldn't be in light for a month. I put on like 30 pounds because my pituitary gland got knocked around and my hormones were all screwed up. I had never been hit like that in a fight. You know, it really freaked me out because it was like, man, I am my son's only parent. If I'm all screwed up and I can't drive and I can't work and say this injury is so bad I can't fight anymore...what if I'm incapable of doing that? I can't get to the point where my brain is mush and I can barely talk, because my son's life depends on my health."

A matchup between Ronda Rousey and Zingano took place at UFC 184 for the women's bantamweight title. Zingano was quickly submitted in the fight's opening seconds.

Zingano returned to face Julianna Peña at UFC 200 on July 9, 2016. She lost the match by decision, with judges all returning 29-28 scores in favor of Peña.

Zingano faced Ketlen Vieira on March 3, 2018, at UFC 222. She lost the fight via split decision.

She then faced Marion Reneau at UFC Fight Night 133 on July 14, 2018. She won the fight by unanimous decision.

Zingano faced Megan Anderson in a featherweight fight on December 29, 2018, at UFC 232. She lost the fight in a bizarre way, via technical knock out in round one after an eye injury from an Anderson kick that didn't allow her to continue. Anderson's toe grazed Zingano's eyeball, rendering her unable to continue due to blurred vision. Although the injury looked like it could potentially be serious, Zingano later reported that the condition of her eye was getting better. On January 14, 2019, it was revealed that Zingano appealed the loss on the grounds of Unified Rules of MMA's definition of eye gouging. CSAC upheld Anderson's win at the commission meeting on February 19, 2019.

On August 14, 2019, it was announced that Zingano had been released from the UFC.

=== Bellator MMA ===
On October 29, 2019, it was announced that Zingano had signed with Bellator MMA.

In her promotional debut, Zingano faced Gabby Holloway at Bellator 245 on September 11, 2020. She won the fight via unanimous decision.

Zingano faced Olivia Parker on April 9, 2021 at Bellator 256. She won the bout via first round armbar submission.

Zingano was scheduled to face Pam Sorenson on March 11, 2022 at Bellator 276. However, Zingano was forced to pull out due to injury and the bout was cancelled. The bout was rebooked for Bellator 282 on June 24, 2022. She won the bout via unanimous decision.

Zingano faced Leah McCourt on March 31, 2023 at Bellator 293. She won the fight via unanimous decision.

Zingano faced reigning champion Cris Cyborg for the Bellator Women's Featherweight Championship on October 7, 2023, at Bellator 300. She lost the fight via TKO in the first round.

=== Global Fight League ===
Zingano was scheduled to face Alexa Conners in the inaugural Global Fight League event on May 24, 2025 at GFL 1. However, the first two GFL events were postponed indefinitely.

== Personal life ==
Zingano married Brazilian Jiu-Jitsu black belt Mauricio Zingano in 2010. Her husband committed suicide on January 13, 2014. She has a son (born 2006), making her the first mother to compete in the UFC. Ahead of her second Bellator MMA fight, she set up a scholarship fund to help students who have been recently bereaved with $10,000.

== Championships and accomplishments ==
- Ultimate Fighting Championship
  - Fight of the Night (One time)
  - First woman to win a UFC "Fight of the Night" award (together with Miesha Tate)
  - UFC.com Awards
    - 2013: Ranked #7 Newcomer of the Year
- Ring Of Fire
  - ROF Women's Flyweight Champion
  - ROF Women's Bantamweight Champion
- Fight To Win
  - FTW Women's 125 lbs Champion
  - FTW Women's 130 lbs Champion

== Mixed martial arts record ==
Professional record breakdown
19 matches	14 wins	5 losses
By knockout	5	2
By submission	4	1
By decision	5	2

Res.	Record	Opponent	Method	Event	Date	Round	Time	Location	Notes
Loss	14–5	Cris Cyborg	TKO (punches)	Bellator 300	October 7, 2023	1	4:01	San Diego, California, United States	For the Bellator Women's Featherweight World Championship.
Win	14–4	Leah McCourt	Decision (unanimous)	Bellator 293	March 31, 2023	3	5:00	Temecula, California, United States	
Win	13–4	Pam Sorenson	Decision (unanimous)	Bellator 282	June 24, 2022	3	5:00	Uncasville, Connecticut, United States	Zingano was deducted one point in round 1 due to an illegal knee.
Win	12–4	Olivia Parker	Submission (armbar)	Bellator 256	April 9, 2021	1	2:56	Uncasville, Connecticut, United States	
Win	11–4	Gabby Holloway	Decision (unanimous)	Bellator 245	September 11, 2020	3	5:00	Uncasville, Connecticut, United States	Catchweight (150.7 lbs) bout; Holloway missed weight.
Loss	10–4	Megan Anderson	TKO (eye injury)	UFC 232	December 29, 2018	1	1:01	Inglewood, California, United States	Featherweight debut.
Win	10–3	Marion Reneau	Decision (unanimous)	UFC Fight Night: dos Santos vs. Ivanov	July 14, 2018	3	5:00	Boise, Idaho, United States	
Loss	9–3	Ketlen Vieira	Decision (split)	UFC 222	March 3, 2018	3	5:00	Las Vegas, Nevada, United States	
Loss	9–2	Julianna Peña	Decision (unanimous)	UFC 200	July 9, 2016	3	5:00	Las Vegas, Nevada, United States	
Loss	9–1	Ronda Rousey	Submission (straight armbar)	UFC 184	February 28, 2015	1	0:14	Los Angeles, California, United States	For the UFC Women's Bantamweight Championship.
Win	9–0	Amanda Nunes	TKO (elbows and punches)	UFC 178	September 27, 2014	3	1:21	Las Vegas, Nevada, United States	
Win	8–0	Miesha Tate	TKO (knees and elbow)	The Ultimate Fighter: Team Jones vs. Team Sonnen Finale	April 13, 2013	3	2:55	Las Vegas, Nevada, United States	Fight of the Night.
Win	7–0	Raquel Pennington	Submission (rear-naked choke)	Invicta FC 3: Penne vs Sugiyama	October 6, 2012	2	3:32	Kansas City, Kansas, United States	Return to Bantamweight.
Win	6–0	Takayo Hashi	KO (slam)	Fight To Win: Outlaws	May 14, 2011	3	4:42	Denver, Colorado, United States	Won the Fight To Win Women's Flyweight Championship.
Win	5–0	Carina Damm	TKO (punches and elbows)	Crowbar MMA: Winter Brawl	December 10, 2010	2	3:37	Grand Forks, North Dakota, United States	
Win	4–0	Ivana Coleman	TKO (punches)	Ring Of Fire 38: Ascension	June 5, 2010	1	1:54	Broomfield, Colorado, United States	Won the inaugural Ring Of Fire Women's Flyweight Championship.
Win	3–0	Barb Honchak	Decision (unanimous)	Fight To Win: Phenoms	January 30, 2010	3	5:00	Denver, Colorado, United States	Won the Fight To Win Women's Bantamweight Championship.
Win	2–0	Angela Samaro	Submission (anaconda choke)	Ring Of Fire 33: Adrenaline	January 10, 2009	2	3:40	Broomfield, Colorado, United States	
Win	1–0	Karina Taylor	Submission (armbar)	Ring Of Fire 32: Respect	June 13, 2008	1	2:30	Broomfield, Colorado, United States	Won the inaugural Ring Of Fire Women's Bantamweight Championship.

Exhibition record breakdown		
4 matches	3 wins	1 loss
By knockout	2	1
By submission	1	0

Res.	Record	Opponent	Method	Event	Date	Round	Time	Location	Notes
Win	3–1	Krystal Macatol	Submission (armbar)	Battlequest 8	April 11, 2008	1	0:51	Denver, Colorado, United States	
Loss	2–1	Louise Johnson	TKO (punches)	Kickdown Classic 45: Season's Beatings 2	December 8, 2007	3	2:24	Lakewood, Colorado, United States	
Win	2–0	Colette Elaine Garcia	TKO (punches)	Ring Of Fire 31: Undisputed	December 1, 2007	3	0:45	Broomfield, Colorado, United States	
Win	1–0	Ann Wyborny	TKO (punches)	Premier Championship Fighting 1: HellRazor	October 26, 2007	1	1:43	Denver, Colorado, United States	

== Pay-per-view bouts ==
No	Event	Fight	Date	Venue	City	PPV buys
1.	UFC 184	Rousey vs. Zingano	February 28, 2015	Staples Center	Los Angeles, California, United States	590,000

== See also ==
- List of current Bellator fighters
- List of female mixed martial artists
