= Jessamyn Duke =

American professional wrestler and former mixed martial artist

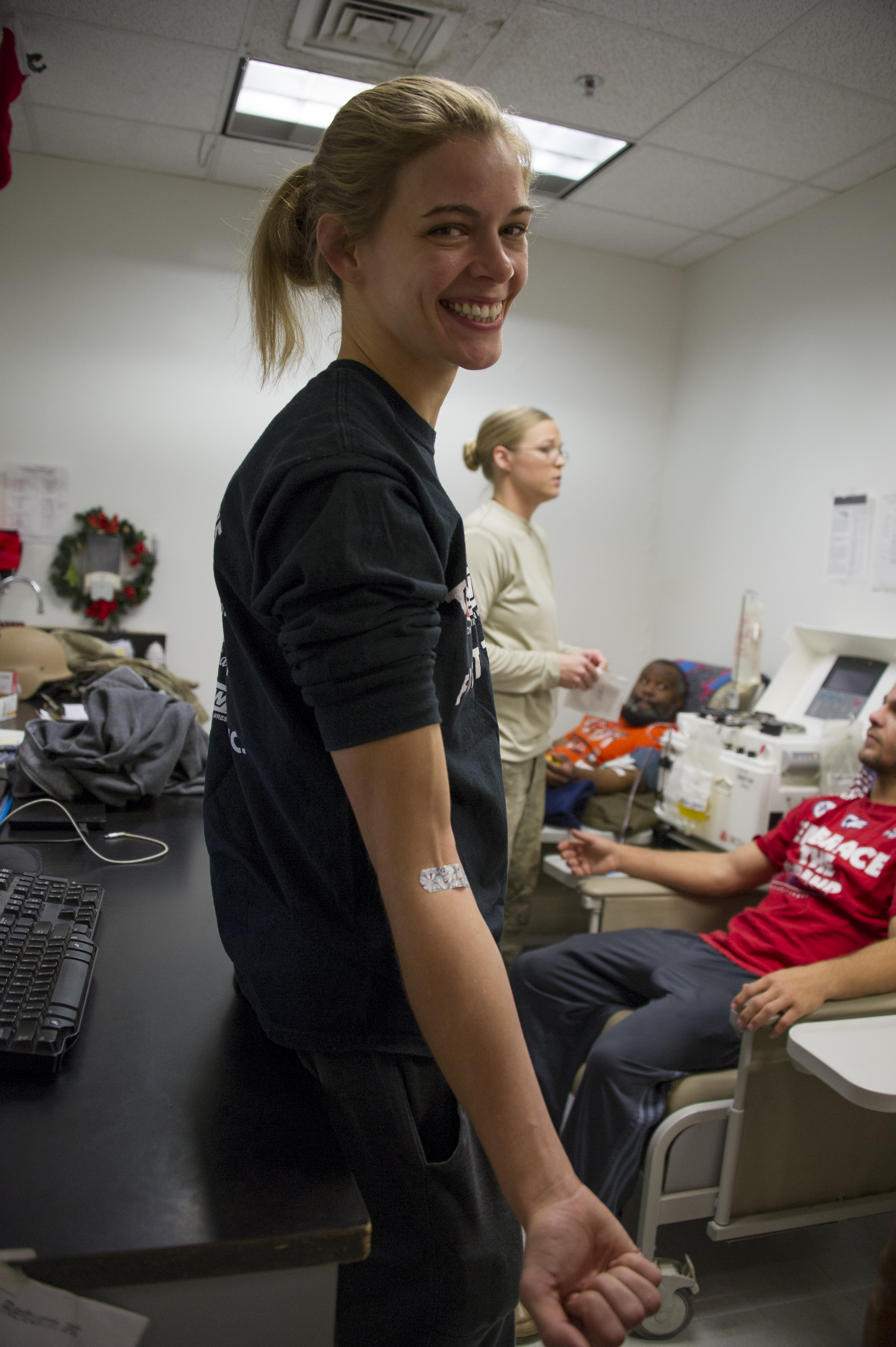
- Duke in 2016
- Born: Jessamyn Laurel Duke; June 24, 1986 (age 40); Whitesburg, Kentucky, U.S.
- Professional wrestling career
- Ring name: Jessamyn Duke
- Billed height: 5 ft 11 in (1.80 m)
- Billed weight: 135 lb (61 kg; 9.6 st)
- Trained by: WWE Performance Center; Santino Bros. Wrestling
- Debut: August 25, 2018
- Mixed martial arts career Martial arts career
- Division: Bantamweight (135 lb); Featherweight (145 lb)
- Reach: 73 in (190 cm)
- Style: Muay Thai, Brazilian jiu-jitsu
- Fighting out of: Richmond, Kentucky, United States
- Team: Glendale Fighting Club (2013–present)
- Rank: Purple belt in 10th Planet Jiu-Jitsu
- Years active: 2010–2016 (MMA)

Mixed martial arts record
- Total: 9
- Wins: 3
- By knockout: 1
- By submission: 1
- By decision: 1
- Losses: 5
- By knockout: 2
- By submission: 1
- By decision: 2
- No contests: 1

Amateur record
- Total: 7
- Wins: 5
- By knockout: 1
- By submission: 3
- By decision: 1
- Losses: 2
- By knockout: 1
- By decision: 1

Other information
- University: Eastern Kentucky University
- Notable school: Whitesburg High School
- Mixed martial arts record from Sherdog

Jessamyn Laurel Duke (born June 24, 1986) is an American professional wrestler and former mixed martial artist. As a wrestler, she worked with WWE as part of their NXT brand. She formerly competed for Ultimate Fighting Championship (UFC) and Invicta Fighting Championships in the women's bantamweight division.

== Mixed martial arts career ==
=== Early career ===
Duke started her amateur career in 2010. She fought mainly for Absolute Action MMA and Tuff-N-Uff. She obtained the amateur featherweight title in both organizations.

In 2012, Duke moved to professional mixed martial arts and signed with Invicta FC.

=== Invicta Fighting Championships ===
Duke made her professional and promotional debut against Suzie Montero on July 28, 2012, at Invicta FC 2. She won via TKO in the third round.

Duke faced Marciea Allen on October 6, 2012, at Invicta FC 3. She won via submission due to an armbar in the first round. This victory earned her a submission of the night bonus award, which was split between Duke and Stephanie Frausto, due to her submission victory over Amy Davis in the same event.

Duke faced Miriam Nakamoto on April 5, 2013, at Invicta FC 5. The result was originally a KO victory for Nakamoto but was later overturned by the Missouri Office of Athletics to no contest due to an illegal knee.

=== The Ultimate Fighter ===
In August 2013, Duke was announced as a cast member of The Ultimate Fighter: Team Rousey vs. Team Tate. She defeated Laura Howarth via submission due to a triangle choke during the entry round and was the second female pick of Team Rousey.

Duke faced Raquel Pennington in the elimination round. Pennington defeated Duke via unanimous decision (29–28, 29–28, 29–28) and the performance earned both participants Fight of The Season honors.

=== Ultimate Fighting Championship ===
Duke made her promotional debut against TUF 18 teammate Peggy Morgan on November 30, 2013, at The Ultimate Fighter 18 Finale. She won via unanimous decision (30–27, 30–27, 30–27).

In her second UFC fight, Duke faced Bethe Correia at UFC 172. She lost the fight via unanimous decision (30–27, 29–28, 30–27).

Duke faced Leslie Smith at UFC Fight Night: Cowboy vs. Miller on July 16, 2014. She lost the fight via TKO early in the first round after taking several punches to the face and body.

Duke faced Elizabeth Phillips at UFC on Fox: Dillashaw vs. Barão 2 on July 25, 2015, in a rematch of their amateur bout at RFA 2 – Yvel vs. Alexander. Duke lost the fight via unanimous decision and was subsequently released from the promotion.

=== Return to Invicta FC ===
Following her third straight loss in the UFC, Duke re-signed with Invicta and faced Irene Aldana at Invicta FC 16 on March 11, 2016. She lost the fight by a first-round technical knockout.

Duke faced Cindy Dandois at Invicta FC 18 on July 29, 2016. She lost the fight by a first-round submission.

== Professional wrestling career ==
=== WWE (2018–2021) ===
Duke started her professional wrestling training at Santino Bros. Pro Wrestling School in California. On May 7, 2018, WWE announced that Duke, along with Marina Shafir, had signed with WWE and reported to the Performance Center for training.

On October 28 at WWE Evolution, Duke and Shafir made their WWE debuts as heels when they interfered during the NXT Women's Championship match, in which they helped Shayna Baszler win the title over Kairi Sane. Duke and Shafir then aligned themselves with Baszler establishing themselves as heels in the process. They made another appearance at NXT TakeOver: WarGames when they interfered during Baszler and Sane's two out of three falls match, in which Baszler scored the first fall and the victory in the latter to retain the title. On the December 19, 2018, episode of NXT Shafir and Duke made their NXT in-ring debut and lost to Io Shirai and Dakota Kai when Io pinned Shafir after a Moonsault. At NXT TakeOver: Phoenix, Duke and Shafir assisted Baszler in retaining the title against Bianca Belair. On October 23, 2019, Duke and Shafir faced Tegan Nox and Dakota Kai in a number one contender's match for the Women's Tag Team Championship, but were defeated.

After several months of inactivity, Duke returned to WWE television on August 17, 2020, reuniting with Baszler and Shafir, after Nia Jax attacked Shafir and Duke. On the August 31 episode of Raw, Duke made her debut on Raw Underground, an underground fight club hosted by Shane McMahon, where she easily defeated local competitor Avery Taylor. This turned out to be her final WWE appearance. Duke worked as a full-time digital content creator for WWE and UpUpDownDown brand. On May 19, 2021, WWE announced that Duke was released from her WWE contract.

== Personal life ==
Duke is a self-described gamer. In an interview, Ronda Rousey estimated that Duke "pays more of her bills streaming than she does from fighting".

== Championships and accomplishments ==
=== Mixed martial arts ===
- Ultimate Fighting Championship
  - The Ultimate Fighter 18 Fight of the Season vs. Raquel Pennington
- Invicta Fighting Championships
  - Submission of the night (one time) vs. Marciea Allen
- Absolute Action MMA
  - AAMMA amateur featherweight title (one time)
  - One successful title defense
- Tuff-N-Uff
  - Tuff-N-Uff amateur featherweight title (one time)

=== Muay Thai ===
- World Muay Thai Association
  - WMA welterweight (152 lb) title

=== Professional wrestling ===
- Pro Wrestling Illustrated
  - Ranked No. 69 of the top 100 female wrestlers in the PWI Women's 100 in 2019

== Mixed martial arts record ==
Professional record breakdown
9 matches	3 wins	5 losses
By knockout	1	2
By submission	1	1
By decision	1	2
No contests	1	

Res.	Record	Opponent	Method	Event	Date	Round	Time	Location	Notes
Loss	3–5 (1)	Cindy Dandois	Submission (armbar)	Invicta FC 18	July 29, 2016	1	1:33	Kansas City, Missouri, United States	
Loss	3–4 (1)	Irene Aldana	TKO (punches)	Invicta FC 16	March 11, 2016	1	3:08	Las Vegas, Nevada, United States	
Loss	3–3 (1)	Elizabeth Phillips	Decision (unanimous)	UFC on Fox: Dillashaw vs. Barão 2	July 25, 2015	3	5:00	Chicago, Illinois, United States	
Loss	3–2 (1)	Leslie Smith	TKO (punches)	UFC Fight Night: Cowboy vs. Miller	July 16, 2014	1	2:24	Atlantic City, New Jersey, United States	
Loss	3–1 (1)	Bethe Correia	Decision (unanimous)	UFC 172	April 26, 2014	3	5:00	Baltimore, Maryland, United States	
Win	3–0 (1)	Peggy Morgan	Decision (unanimous)	The Ultimate Fighter 18 Finale	November 30, 2013	3	5:00	Las Vegas, Nevada, United States	
NC	2–0 (1)	Miriam Nakamoto	No Contest (overturned)	Invicta FC 5	April 5, 2013	1	2:20	Kansas City, Missouri, United States	Originally a KO victory for Nakamoto; overturned due to an illegal knee.
Win	2–0	Marciea Allen	Submission (armbar)	Invicta FC 3	October 6, 2012	1	4:42	Kansas City, Kansas, United States	Submission of the Night.
Win	1–0	Suzie Montero	TKO (elbows and punches)	Invicta FC 2	July 28, 2012	3	2:32	Kansas City, Kansas, United States	

Exhibition record breakdown		
2 matches	1 win	1 loss
By submission	1	0
By decision	0	1

Res.	Record	Opponent	Method	Event	Date	Round	Time	Location	Notes
Loss	1–1	Raquel Pennington	Decision (unanimous)	The Ultimate Fighter: Team Rousey vs. Team Tate	October 9, 2013 (air date)	3	5:00	Las Vegas, Nevada, United States	TUF 18 Quarter Final round.
Win	1–0	Laura Howarth	Submission (triangle choke)	The Ultimate Fighter: Team Rousey vs. Team Tate	September 4, 2013 (air date)	1	3:50	Las Vegas, Nevada, United States	TUF 18 elimination round.

Amateur record breakdown		
7 matches	5 wins	2 losses
By knockout	1	1
By submission	3	0
By decision	1	1

Res.	Record	Opponent	Method	Event	Date	Round	Time	Location	Notes
Win	5–2	Elizabeth Phillips	Submission (guillotine choke)	RFA 2 – Yvel vs. Alexander	March 30, 2012	2	0:58	Kearney, Nebraska, United States	
Loss	4–2	Amanda Bell	TKO (punches)	Absolute Action MMA 20: Battle Against Breast Cancer 2	November 19, 2011	3	2:35	Florence, Kentucky, United States	Lost the AAMMA Amateur Featherweight Championship.
Win	4–1	Autumn Richardson	Decision (unanimous)	Tuff-N-Uff: Future Stars of MMA	July 1, 2011	3	3:00	Las Vegas, Nevada, United States	Won the Tuff-N-Uff Amateur Featherweight Championship.
Win	3–1	Crystal Bentley	Submission (rear-naked choke)	Absolute Action MMA 13	May 7, 2011	2	1:29	Florence, Kentucky, United States	Defended the AAMMA Amateur Featherweight Championship.
Win	2–1	Sarah Cook	Submission (rear-naked choke)	Absolute Action MMA 12: The Anniversary Show	April 2, 2011	1	0:52	Florence, Kentucky, United States	Won the AAMMA Amateur Featherweight Championship.
Loss	1–1	Ashlee Evans-Smith	Decision (unanimous)	Tuff-N-Uff: Las Vegas vs. 10th Planet Riverside	January 7, 2011	3	2:00	Las Vegas, Nevada, United States	
Win	1–0	Alexandria Stobbe	TKO (punches)	Absolute Action MMA 5: Battle Against Breast Cancer	October 2, 2010	1	1:42	Florence, Kentucky, United States	

== See also ==
- List of female mixed martial artists
