= Ketlen Vieira =

Brazilian mixed martial artist

- Born: Ketlen Vieira da Silva; 26 August 1991 (age 35); Manaus, Amazonas, Brazil
- Other names: Fenômeno
- Height: 5 ft 9 in (175 cm)
- Weight: 135 lb (61 kg; 9 st 9 lb)
- Division: Bantamweight
- Reach: 173 cm (68 in)
- Fighting out of: Manaus, Amazonas, Brazil
- Team: Team Feitosa; Nova União Manaus
- Rank: Black belt in Brazilian Jiu-Jitsu under André Pederneiras; Black belt in Judo
- Years active: 2014–present

Mixed martial arts record
- Total: 22
- Wins: 16
- By knockout: 2
- By submission: 4
- By decision: 10
- Losses: 6
- By knockout: 1
- By decision: 5

Other information
- Mixed martial arts record from Sherdog

Ketlen Vieira da Silva (born 26 August 1991) is a Brazilian professional mixed martial artist who competes in the Women's Featherweight division of the Professional Fighters League (PFL). She has also competed in the women's Bantamweight division of the Ultimate Fighting Championship (UFC), where she amassed a 10–5 record.

== Background ==
Vieira was born in Manaus, Amazonas, Brazil. She started training Brazilian Jiu-Jitsu and when she was twelve she started training in Judo. She holds black belts in both disciplines. She is also a decorated wrestler with multiple prestigious titles, including Brazilian national wrestling championship. She studied law at University Nilton Lins, but dropped out in order to pursue a career in mixed martial arts. She eventually transitioned to MMA and trained under Marcinho Pontes, who was José Aldo's early coach at Nova Uniao Manaus gym.

== Mixed martial arts career ==
=== Early career ===
Vieira fought all of her fights in Brazil where she made her professional debut on 2 October 2014, at Circuito de Lutas: Fight Night 4 in São Paulo. She faced Juliana Leite and knocked out Leite in round two. She continued to win the next 5 fights under Mr. Cage and Big Way Fight Night banners where she won the Mr. Cage bantamweight title. Vieira amassed a record of 6–0 in 17 months prior to being signed by the UFC.

=== Ultimate Fighting Championship ===
Vieira made her promotional debut on 1 October 2016, at UFC Fight Night 96 in Portland, Oregon, United States. She faced Kelly Faszholz and ultimately edged out her opponent to win by split decision. In the post fight interview, Vieira explained her difficulty with weight cutting for this fight. Two days prior to the scheduled fight, she needed to drink one liter of water to provide a urine sample to USADA, which interfered with the process of her weight cut prior to the USADA visit.

She took on Ashlee Evans-Smith at UFC on Fox 24 on 15 April 2017. After three rounds, the judges handed the victory to Vieira via unanimous decision with the score board of (29–28, 30–27, 29–28).

Vieira was originally expected to face Sara McMann at UFC 214 on 29 July 2017. However, the fight was moved to UFC 215 on 9 September 2017. Vieira won the bout via arm-triangle choke submission in the second round.

A bout against Germaine de Randamie was announced for UFC Fight Night 125 on 3 February 2018. However, the bout was soon cancelled due to a hand injury sustained by de Randamie.

Vieira faced Cat Zingano on 3 March 2018, at UFC 222. She won the fight via split decision.

Vieira was scheduled to face Tonya Evinger on 22 September 2018, at UFC Fight Night 137. However, on 7 August 2018, she pulled out due to a knee injury.

Vieira fought Irene Aldana on 14 December 2019, at UFC 245. She lost the fight by knockout in the first round.

Vieira was scheduled to face Marion Reneau on 9 May 2020, at UFC 250. Due to the event being relocated to the United States, Vieira being unable to compete due to visa issues: However, on 9 April, Dana White, the president of UFC announced that this event was postponed to a future date Instead, Vieira was scheduled to face Yana Kunitskaya on 1 August 2020, at UFC Fight Night: Holm vs. Aldana, and on 15 July 2020, it was announced that the bout was moved to UFC Fight Night 174 on 8 August 2020. Subsequently, Vieira was removed from the card on 30 July for undisclosed reasons and replaced by Julija Stoliarenko.

The bout with Reneau was rescheduled and was expected to take place on 27 September 2020, at UFC 253. However, Reneau withdrew from the bout citing an undisclosed injury and she was replaced by Sijara Eubanks. Vieira won the fight via unanimous decision.

The bout with Yana Kunitskaya was rescheduled and eventually took place on 20 February 2021, at UFC Fight Night 185. At the weigh-ins, Vieira weighed in at 138 pounds, two pounds over the women's bantamweight non-title fight limit. She was fined 20% of her purse which went to her opponent, Kunitskaya, and the bout proceeded at a catchweight. Vieira lost the fight via unanimous decision.

Vieira was scheduled for a rematch against Sara McMann on 28 August 2021, at UFC on ESPN 30. However, McMann announced in mid August that a "reinjury" forced her out of the bout. Instead, Vieira was scheduled to face Miesha Tate on 16 October 2021, at UFC Fight Night 195. However, on 22 September, the bout was pulled from the card when Tate tested positive for COVID-19. The bout was rebooked to 20 November 2021, as the main event of UFC Fight Night 198. Vieira won the bout via unanimous decision.

Vieira faced Holly Holm on 21 May 2022, at UFC Fight Night 206. She won the fight via controversial split decision. 18 out of 20 media outlets scored the bout as a win for Holm.

Vieira faced Raquel Pennington on 14 January 2023, at UFC Fight Night 217. She lost the fight via split decision.

Vieira faced Pannie Kianzad on 22 July 2023, at UFC Fight Night 224. She won the fight via unanimous decision.

Vieira was scheduled to face Macy Chiasson on 13 January 2024, at UFC Fight Night 234. However, Vieira was pulled as a result of an injury and the bout was scrapped.

Vieira faced 2019 and 2021 PFL Women's Lightweight Champion Kayla Harrison on 5 October 2024 at UFC 307. She lost the fight by unanimous decision.

Vieira was re-scheduled to face Macy Chiasson on 22 February 2025 at UFC Fight Night 252. However, due to an injury suffered by Chiasson, the bout was removed from the card. The bout between Viera and Chiasson has since been re-booked for 31 May 2025 and is expected to take place at UFC on ESPN 68. The bout was originally scheduled to be a women's bantamweight bout but on the day of the weigh-ins, it was announced that the bout would be changed to a featherweight bout due to "weight management issues" from Vieira, who in turn forfeited 25% of her purse. She won the fight by unanimous decision.

Vieira faced Norma Dumont on 1 November 2025 at UFC Fight Night 263. She lost the fight by split decision. 6 out of 7 media outlets scored the bout for Vieira.

Vieira faced Jacqueline Cavalcanti on 16 May 2026 at UFC Fight Night 276. She won the fight by unanimous decision.

On 22 May 2026, it was reported that Vieira was removed from the UFC roster, despite winning her most recent fight.

=== Professional Fighters League ===
On 23 June 2026, it was reported that Vieira signed with the Professional Fighters League.

In her PFL debut, Vieira was scheduled to challenge Cris Cyborg for the PFL Women's Featherweight World Championship on August 22, 2026, at PFL Tampa. However at the weigh-ins, Vieira weighed in at 152.2 pounds, 7.2 pounds over the featherweight title fight limit and she became ineligible for the title. As a result, the bout proceeded as a non-title contest. Vieira lost the bout via unanimous decision.

== Championships and accomplishments ==
=== Mixed martial arts ===
- Ultimate Fighting Championship
  - Highest takedown defense percentage in UFC Women's Bantamweight division history (88.9%)
  - Third most bouts in UFC Women's Bantamweight division history (14)
  - Third most wins in UFC Women's Bantamweight division history (9)
  - Second most total fight time in UFC Women's Bantamweight division history (3:34:07) (behind Raquel Pennington)
  - Third longest average fight time in UFC Women's Bantamweight division history (15:18)
  - Third most total control time in UFC Women's Bantamweight division history (1:02:25)
  - Fourth most top-position time in UFC Women's Bantamweight division history (45:08)
  - Third longest average fight time in UFC Women's Bantamweight division history (15:21)
  - Fourth most takedowns landed in UFC Women's Bantamweight division history (20)
  - Fifth most total strikes landed in UFC Women's Bantamweight division history (1107)
  - Tied (Julianna Peña & Mayra Bueno Silva) for fourth most submission attempts in UFC Women's Bantamweight division history (8)
  - Tied (Raquel Pennington) for most split decision wins in UFC Women's Bantamweight division history (3)
    - Second most decision wins in UFC Women's Bantamweight division history (8) (behind Raquel Pennington)
- Mr. Cage
  - Mr. Cage Women's Bantamweight Champion

== Mixed martial arts record ==
Professional record breakdown
22 matches	16 wins	6 losses
By knockout	2	1
By submission	4	0
By decision	10	5

Res.	Record	Opponent	Method	Event	Date	Round	Time	Location	Notes
Loss	16–6	Cris Cyborg	Decision (unanimous)	PFL Tampa: Cyborg vs. Vieira	22 August 2026	5	5:00	Tampa, Florida, United States	Return to Featherweight. For the PFL Women's Featherweight Championship. Vieira missed weight (152.2 lb) and was ineligible for the title.
Win	16–5	Jacqueline Cavalcanti	Decision (unanimous)	UFC Fight Night: Allen vs. Costa	16 May 2026	3	5:00	Las Vegas, Nevada, United States	
Loss	15–5	Norma Dumont	Decision (split)	UFC Fight Night: Garcia vs. Onama	1 November 2025	3	5:00	Las Vegas, Nevada, United States	Return to Bantamweight.
Win	15–4	Macy Chiasson	Decision (unanimous)	UFC on ESPN: Gamrot vs. Klein	31 May 2025	3	5:00	Las Vegas, Nevada, United States	Featherweight debut.
Loss	14–4	Kayla Harrison	Decision (unanimous)	UFC 307	5 October 2024	3	5:00	Salt Lake City, Utah, United States	
Win	14–3	Pannie Kianzad	Decision (unanimous)	UFC Fight Night: Aspinall vs. Tybura	22 July 2023	3	5:00	London, England	
Loss	13–3	Raquel Pennington	Decision (split)	UFC Fight Night: Strickland vs. Imavov	14 January 2023	3	5:00	Las Vegas, Nevada, United States	
Win	13–2	Holly Holm	Decision (split)	UFC Fight Night: Holm vs. Vieira	21 May 2022	5	5:00	Las Vegas, Nevada, United States	
Win	12–2	Miesha Tate	Decision (unanimous)	UFC Fight Night: Vieira vs. Tate	20 November 2021	5	5:00	Las Vegas, Nevada, United States	
Loss	11–2	Yana Kunitskaya	Decision (unanimous)	UFC Fight Night: Blaydes vs. Lewis	20 February 2021	3	5:00	Las Vegas, Nevada, United States	Catchweight (138 lb) bout; Vieira missed weight.
Win	11–1	Sijara Eubanks	Decision (unanimous)	UFC 253	27 September 2020	3	5:00	Abu Dhabi, United Arab Emirates	
Loss	10–1	Irene Aldana	KO (punches)	UFC 245	14 December 2019	1	4:51	Las Vegas, Nevada, United States	
Win	10–0	Cat Zingano	Decision (split)	UFC 222	3 March 2018	3	5:00	Las Vegas, Nevada, United States	
Win	9–0	Sara McMann	Submission (arm-triangle choke)	UFC 215	9 September 2017	2	4:16	Edmonton, Alberta, Canada	
Win	8–0	Ashlee Evans-Smith	Decision (unanimous)	UFC on Fox: Johnson vs. Reis	15 April 2017	3	5:00	Kansas City, Missouri, United States	
Win	7–0	Kelly Faszholz	Decision (split)	UFC Fight Night: Lineker vs. Dodson	1 October 2016	3	5:00	Portland, Oregon, United States	
Win	6–0	Estefani Almeida	Decision (unanimous)	Big Way Fight Night 9	20 February 2016	3	5:00	Manaus, Brazil	Won the Big Way Bantamweight Championship.
Win	5–0	Jessica Maciel	TKO (punches)	Mr. Cage 20	17 December 2015	1	3:20	Manaus, Brazil	Defended the Mr. Cage Bantamweight Championship.
Win	4–0	Laet Ferreira	Submission (rear-naked choke)	Big Way Fight Night 1	12 September 2015	1	2:22	Manaus, Brazil	
Win	3–0	Monique Bastos	Submission (rear-naked choke)	Mr. Cage 16	12 March 2015	1	4:07	Manaus, Brazil	Defended the Mr. Cage Bantamweight Championship.
Win	2–0	Kenya Miranda da Silva	Submission (kimura)	Mr. Cage 14	13 November 2014	2	N/A	Manaus, Brazil	Won the vacant Mr. Cage Bantamweight Championship.
Win	1–0	Juliana Leite	TKO (punches)	Circuito de Lutas: Fight Night 4	2 October 2014	2	1:36	São Paulo, Brazil	Bantamweight debut.

== See also ==
- List of current PFL fighters
- List of female mixed martial artists
