= UFC Fight Night: dos Santos vs. Ivanov =

UFC mixed martial arts event in 2018

- The poster for UFC Fight Night: dos Santos vs. Ivanov
- Promotion: Ultimate Fighting Championship
- Date: July 14, 2018
- Venue: CenturyLink Arena
- City: Boise, Idaho
- Attendance: 5,650
- Total gate: $591,575

Event chronology
UFC 226: Miocic vs. Cormier	UFC Fight Night: dos Santos vs. Ivanov	UFC Fight Night: Shogun vs. Smith

UFC Fight Night: dos Santos vs. Ivanov (also known as UFC Fight Night 133) was a mixed martial arts event produced by the Ultimate Fighting Championship that was held on July 14, 2018 at CenturyLink Arena in Boise, Idaho, United States.

== Background ==
The event marked the promotion's first visit to Idaho.

A heavyweight bout between former UFC Heavyweight Champion Junior dos Santos and former WSOF Heavyweight Champion Blagoy Ivanov served as the event headliner.

A strawweight bout between former WSOF Women's Strawweight Champion Jessica Aguilar and Jodie Esquibel was originally expected to take place at UFC Fight Night: Rivera vs. Moraes. However the bout was removed from the card the day of the event by the NYSAC due to a concern over a medical issue with Aguilar. The pairing was rescheduled for this event.

James Vick was expected to face Paul Felder at the event. However, on June 27, Vick was pulled from the bout to act as a replacement against former WSOF Lightweight Champion Justin Gaethje at UFC Fight Night: Gaethje vs. Vick. In turn, Felder was moved to a welterweight bout against Mike Perry at UFC 226.

== Results ==
Main card (Fox Sports 1)
Weight class				Method	Round	Time	Notes
Heavyweight	Junior dos Santos	def.	Blagoy Ivanov	Decision (unanimous) (50–45, 50–45, 50–45)	5	5:00
Welterweight	Sage Northcutt	def.	Zak Ottow	KO (punches)	2	3:13
Featherweight	Ricky Glenn	def.	Dennis Bermudez	Decision (split) (28–29, 30–27, 29–28)	3	5:00
Welterweight	Niko Price	def.	Randy Brown	KO (punches)	2	1:09
Featherweight	Chad Mendes	def.	Myles Jury	TKO (punches)	1	2:52
Women's Bantamweight	Cat Zingano	def.	Marion Reneau	Decision (unanimous) (30–27, 30–27, 30–26)	3	5:00
Preliminary card (Fox Sports 1)
Bantamweight	Alejandro Pérez	def.	Eddie Wineland	Decision (unanimous) (29–28, 29–28, 29–28)	3	5:00
Featherweight	Alexander Volkanovski	def.	Darren Elkins	Decision (unanimous) (30–27, 29–28, 29–28)	3	5:00
Flyweight	Said Nurmagomedov	def.	Justin Scoggins	Decision (split) (29–28, 28–29, 29–28)	3	5:00
Featherweight	Raoni Barcelos	def.	Kurt Holobaugh	TKO (punches)	3	1:29
Preliminary card (UFC Fight Pass)
Women's Flyweight	Liz Carmouche	def.	Jennifer Maia	Decision (unanimous) (30–27, 30–27, 29–28)	3	5:00
Flyweight	Mark De La Rosa	def.	Elias Garcia	Submission (rear-naked choke)	2	2:00
Women's Strawweight	Jessica Aguilar	def.	Jodie Esquibel	Decision (unanimous) (30–27, 29–28, 29–28)	3	5:00

== Bonus awards ==
The following fighters earned $50,000 bonuses:

- Fight of the Night: Raoni Barcelos vs. Kurt Holobaugh
- Performance of the Night: Niko Price and Chad Mendes

== See also ==
- List of UFC events
- 2018 in UFC
- List of current UFC fighters
