= Peggy Morgan =

American mixed martial artist (born 1979)

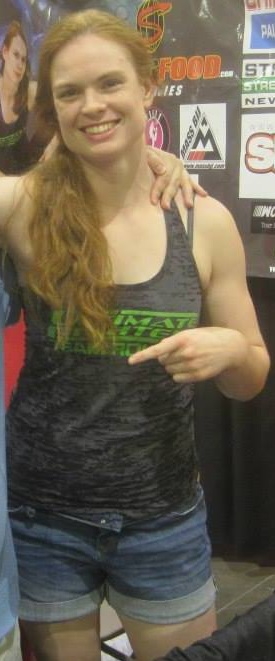
- Born: Margaret Morgan; December 16, 1979 (age 46); Biloxi, Mississippi, U.S.
- Other names: Daywalker
- Nationality: American
- Height: 6 ft 1 in (1.85 m)
- Division: Featherweight
- Style: BJJ, Boxing, Kickboxing, Wrestling
- Fighting out of: Manchester New Hampshire, U.S.
- Team: Mass BJJ
- Rank: Brown belt in Jiu Jitsu Black belt in Wrestling
- Years active: 2012-2017

Mixed martial arts record
- Total: 8
- Wins: 4
- By decision: 4
- Losses: 4
- By knockout: 1
- By submission: 1
- By decision: 2

Other information
- University: Southern New Hampshire University
- Mixed martial arts record from Sherdog

Peggy Morgan (born December 16, 1979) is an American former mixed martial artist who competed in the Featherweight division. She has fought in UFC and Invicta FC.

== Mixed martial arts career ==
=== Ultimate Fighting Championship ===
In August 2013, Peggy Morgan was announced as a cast member of The Ultimate Fighter: Team Rousey vs. Team Tate. She defeated Bethany Marshall via TKO during the entry round and was the second female pick of Team Rousey. She went on to lose to Sarah Moras via submission in the first round to get to the semi-finals.

Morgan made her promotional debut against TUF 18 teammate Jessamyn Duke on November 30, 2013 at The Ultimate Fighter 18 Finale. She lost via unanimous decision (30–27, 30–27, 30–27). Morgan lost the fight via unanimous decision and was subsequently released from the promotion.

=== Invicta ===
Morgan signed with Invicta FC in mid-2014, and made her debut against Irene Aldana at Invicta FC 8: Waterson vs. Tamada on September 9, 2014, losing by submission with a rear-naked choke in the first round.

In her second fight for the promotion, Morgan faced Andria Wawro on December 5, 2014, at Invicta FC 10. She won the fight by unanimous decision. Megan Anderson dominated Morgan at Invicta FC 18: Grasso vs. Esquibel.

On January 12, 2017, Peggy officially announced her retirement from MMA, saying that she had decided after her last fight that she was ready to be done.

== Mixed martial arts record ==
Professional record breakdown
8 matches	4 wins	4 losses
By knockout	0	1
By submission	0	1
By decision	4	2

Res.	Record	Opponent	Method	Event	Date	Round	Time	Location	Notes
Loss	4–4	Megan Anderson	TKO (punches)	Invicta FC 18: Grasso vs. Esquibel	July 29, 2016	1	4:09	Kansas City, Missouri, United States	
Win	4–3	Jessy Miele	Decision (unanimous)	CES 30: Lane vs Felix II	August 14, 2015	3	5:00	Lincoln, Rhode Island, United States	
Loss	3–3	Latoya Walker	Decision (unanimous)	Invicta FC 12: Kankaanpää vs. Souza	April 24, 2015	3	5:00	Kansas City, Missouri, United States	
Win	3–2	Andria Wawro	Decision (unanimous)	Invicta FC 10: Waterson vs. Tiburcio	December 5, 2014	3	5:00	Houston, Texas, United States	
Loss	2–2	Irene Aldana	Submission (rear-naked choke)	Invicta FC 8: Waterson vs. Tamada	September 6, 2014	1	2:50	Kansas City, Missouri, United States	
Loss	2–1	Jessamyn Duke	Decision (unanimous)	The Ultimate Fighter 18 Finale	November 13, 2013	3	5:00	Las Vegas, Nevada, United States	
Win	2–0	Revelina Berto	Decision (unanimous)	CFA 10: McSweeney vs. Staring	March 2, 2013	3	5:00	Coral Gables, Florida, United States	
Win	1–0	Kaline Medeiros	Decision (majority)	Reality Fighting: Mohegan Sun	June 12, 2012	3	5:00	Uncasville, Connecticut, United States	

== Mixed martial arts exhibition record ==
Professional record breakdown
2 matches	1 win	1 loss
By knockout	1	0
By submission	0	1
By decision	0	0

Res.	Record	Opponent	Method	Event	Date	Round	Time	Location	Notes
Loss	1–1	Sarah Moras	Submission (armbar)	The Ultimate Fighter Season 18	June 21, 2013	1	4:39	Las Vegas, Nevada, United States	
Win	1–0	Bethany Marshall	TKO (punches)	The Ultimate Fighter Season 18	May 29, 2013	1	2:58	Las Vegas, Nevada, United States	
