= The Ultimate Fighter: Team Rousey vs. Team Tate =

UFC mixed martial arts television series and event in 2013

- Genre: Reality, Sports
- Created by: Frank Fertitta III, Lorenzo Fertitta, Dana White
- Starring: Dana White, Ronda Rousey, and Miesha Tate
- Country of origin: United States

Production
- Running time: 60 minutes

Original release
- Network: Fox Sports 1
- Release: September 4 – November 27, 2013

The Ultimate Fighter: Team Rousey vs. Team Tate (also known as The Ultimate Fighter 18) is the eighteenth U.S.-based installment of the Ultimate Fighting Championship (UFC)-produced reality television series The Ultimate Fighter.

The series was officially announced by the UFC in March 2013 with the revelation that for the first time women will serve as coaches and the contestants will be both male and female. Women's Bantamweight Champion Ronda Rousey was selected to coach against the winner of the Miesha Tate and Cat Zingano bout on The Ultimate Fighter 17 finale in April 2013. Zingano won the fight, but a few weeks prior to filming was removed from the coaching position due to an injury and replaced by Tate.

The season was the first to air on Fox Sports 1 and debuted on September 4, 2013, and also the first time that it had been seen on BT Sport in the UK debuting on September 5, 2013, at 11PM also.

== Cast ==
=== Coaches ===
Team Rousey

- Ronda Rousey, head coach
- Andy Dermenjian
- Manny Gamburyan, grappling coach
- Marina Shafir
- Edmond Tarverdyan, striking coach
- Nate Diaz, guest coach

Team Tate

- Miesha Tate, head coach
- Thonglor "Master Thong" Armatsena, Muay Thai coach
- Ricky Lundell, wrestling coach
- Bryan Caraway, jiu jitsu coach
- Shaine Jaime
- Jack Anderson, wrestling/submission wrestling coach
- Eric Triliegi, nutritionist
- Melchor Menor, guest coach

=== Fighters ===
- Team Rousey
  - Female fighters: Shayna Baszler, Jessamyn Duke, Peggy Morgan, Jessica Rakoczy
  - Male Fighters: Chris Beal, Davey Grant, Anthony Gutierrez, Michael Wootten
- Team Tate
  - Female fighters: Julianna Peña, Sarah Moras, Raquel Pennington, Roxanne Modafferi
  - Male Fighters: Cody Bollinger, Chris Holdsworth, Josh Hill, Tim Gorman (*Louis Fisette)

* Gorman got injured and was replaced on episode 2 by Fisette

Fighters eliminated during the entry round

- Laura Howarth, Danny Martinez, Revelina Berto, Emil Hartsner, Bethany Marshall, Valérie Létourneau, Lee Sandmeier, Tonya Evinger, Sirwan Kakai, Paddy Holohan, Colleen Schneider, Gina Mazany, Matt Munsey, Tara LaRosa, Rafael De Freitas

== Episodes ==
Episode 1: "History in the Making" (September 4, 2013)

- Ronda Rousey enters the Ultimate Fighter training center; she is surprised to see Miesha Tate enter the center and state she is there to coach.
- Dana White explains that Cat Zingano injured her knee and that Tate stepped up to be her replacement; Rousey is relieved, explaining she thought she was being replaced.
- Unlike previous seasons, this season will feature women for the first time alongside men, all in the 135 pound divisions.
- White greets the 32 fighters (16 men and 16 women) and implores them to leave it all in the cage the next day.
- The 16 preliminary fights began:

Jessamyn Duke defeated Laura Howarth via submission (triangle choke) at 3:50 in the first round.
Davey Grant defeated Danny Martinez via submission (armbar) at 2:02 in the second round.
Jessica Rakoczy defeated Revelina Berto via submission (omoplata) at 2:32 in the first round.
Michael Wootten defeated Emil Hartsner via unanimous decision after three rounds.
Peggy Morgan defeated Bethany Marshall via TKO (punches) at 2:58 in the first round.
Roxanne Modafferi defeated Valerie Letourneau via submission (rear naked choke) at 3:36 in the first round.
Tim Gorman defeated Lee Sandmeier via TKO (punches) at 4:46 in the first round.
Raquel Pennington defeated Tonya Evinger via submission (guillotine choke) in the second round.
Chris Beal defeated Sirwan Kakai via unanimous decision after two rounds.
Josh Hill defeated Patrick Holohan via majority decision after two rounds.
Shayna Baszler defeated Colleen Schneider via submission (armbar) at 4:24 in the first round.
Chris Holdsworth defeated Louis Fisette via submission (arm triangle choke) at 4:09 in the first round.
Julianna Peña defeated Gina Mazany via unanimous decision after two rounds.
Anthony Gutierrez defeated Matt Munsey via unanimous decision after two rounds.
Sarah Moras defeated Tara LaRosa via unanimous decision after two rounds.
Cody Bollinger defeated Rafael de Freitas via TKO (strikes) at 1:54 in the second round.

- White greeted the winners and announced that fighters could receive $25,000 for Knockout of the Season, Submission of the Season and Fight of the Season.
- Rousey and Tate then picked teams and White flipped a coin (green for Rousey, blue for Tate). Rousey won the coin toss and opted to choose the first fight.
- Women's selection:

Coach	1st Pick	2nd Pick	3rd Pick	4th Pick
Tate	Julianna Peña	Sarah Moras	Raquel Pennington	Roxanne Modafferi
Rousey	Shayna Baszler	Jessamyn Duke	Peggy Morgan	Jessica Rakoczy

- Men's selection:

Coach	1st Pick	2nd Pick	3rd Pick	4th Pick
Tate	Cody Bollinger	Chris Holdsworth	Josh Hill	Tim Gorman
Rousey	Chris Beal	Davey Grant	Anthony Gutierrez	Michael Wootten

- White then put Rousey on the spot, forcing her to choose the first fight right there. She chose to match Baszler against Peña, the two first female picks from both teams.

Episode 2: "Ladies First" (September 11, 2013)

- Team Tate's Chris Holdsworth admires the situation and debates the possibility of sexual relationships as the season progresses.
- The women continue to state how seriously they are taking the competition and nothing will interfere with that.
- White arrives at the gym and is accompanied by a doctor who holds the results of Tim Gorman's MRI test. It is bad news, as the doctor reveals a tear to his hamstring. Gorman is devastated by the news and White pulls him from the competition.
- Gorman's replacement on Team Tate is Louis Fisette, who was submitted by Holdsworth in the elimination round after an intense battle.
- Julianna Peña defeated Shayna Baszler via submission (rear naked choke) at 3:08 in the second round.
- After Rousey went after Tate's top female pick in week one, Tate decides to flip the script by selecting the champion's top pick. The match will see Team Tate's second pick Holdsworth go up against Team Rousey's top selection Chris Beal, who earlier in the episode had complained about an injured hand.
- The episode closes with both teams leaving the gym and as Rousey walks by Tate, she angrily accuses her of smiling at Baszler's pain.

Episode 3: "Stick and Move" (September 18, 2013)

- Tate visits the house to bring Julianna Peña a victory butter-fat milkshake and also consoles her friend Shayna Baszler, saying sorry she has to be on Rousey's team. But Baszler says Rousey has "got her back" after her loss.
- Cody Bollinger states that someone told the green team about Team Tate's women's match-ups and he blames Julianna Peña. He then confronts Peña in the van ride back to the house accusing her of the deed. Feeling like she is being attacked, Peña then points the finger at Roxanne Modafferi because she sleeps in the same room as Team Rousey, but her teammates back her up. Later, Peña apologizes to Modafferi who forgives her.
- Jessamyn Duke jokes around with Raquel Pennington telling her that she got access to the "secret list" of women's matches. Duke says that Bollinger overheard and used this as an excuse to blame Peña, just because he is irritated by her actions in the house.
- Both teams gets a private suite at Red Rock Casino to watch the latest UFC fight. While there, Rousey and Tate get into a verbal altercation at the bar when Tate feels Rousey is standing too close to her boyfriend/trainer Bryan Caraway. Rousey then rehashes what Caraway tweeted in March 2012 how he wanted to knock her teeth down her throat on Twitter which he had previously apologized for.
- Tate retaliates by criticizing Rousey's stand-up game by saying she does not know how to "hit the pads," which her trainer Edmond Tarverdyan does not take well and goes on to criticize Tate and Caraway.
- Chris Holdsworth defeated Chris Beal via submission (guillotine) at 4:16 in the first round.
- After the fight, the next match is chosen by Tate: Roxanne Modafferi vs. Jessica Rakoczy.

Episode 4: "Use the Force" (September 25, 2013)

- Former UFC fighter Dennis Hallman joins the blue team as a guest coach and gets a chilly reception by Team Rousey's trainer Edmond Tarverdyan who "eyeballs" him up and down. On camera, Tarverdyan challenges Hallman to a fight. Off camera, the Armenian is tempted by Hallman to engage in combat for strange reasons. Tarverdyan claims he is being targeted to give producers a reason to kick him off the show. Rousey then confronts Hallman and tells him if he wants to "look like a fucking man," he will fight Tarverdyan when there are no cameras around.
- The Caraway/Rousey Twitter incident is brought up again by Team Rousey and the drama ensues, making White play the mediator between both teams, saying that it is not good for the sport.
- During a light sparring session with Modafferi, Raquel Pennington wants to go harder, so Tate starts having the women train with the men. Sarah Moras wants to be one of the guys and asks them to hit her and not hold back, so Cody Bollinger and Louis Fisette oblige.
- Jessica Rakoczy defeated Roxanne Modafferi via TKO (punches) at 2:33 in the second round.
- Modafferi is very upset and Rakoczy consoles her, stating that things like this are what make a champion.
- Both teams feel bad for Modafferi's loss because of how hard she worked and nice she is, especially her friend Shayna Baszler who also suffered an emotional breakdown after her loss.
- After the fight, Rousey is back in control and chooses the next match: Davey Grant vs. Louis Fisette.

Episode 5: "Redemption" (October 2, 2013)

- Raquel Pennington expresses to her teammates what it is like being a homosexual athlete.
- During a game of "truth or dare," Louis Fisette gets offended when Anthony Gutierrez answers his truth question by saying that the Canadian is the weakest link of the males on the show.
- Back at the house, some fighters on both teams struggle with the pressure to maintain weight before their fights by not eating "clean."
- Rousey's mother, former judo champion AnnMaria De Mars, stops by the gym to inspire her daughter's team.
- To ease tension between the teams, Tate and her trainers play a joke on Team Rousey's trainer Edmond Tarverdyan by placing a figurine of Sesame Street's "the Count" who they think has a resemblance to, complete with an eyebrow waxing coupon attached it for his unibrow. But thinking he will do something bad in retaliation, Rousey hides it from him.
- Davey Grant defeated Louis Fisette via submission (rear naked choke) at 1:01 in the second round.
- Team Rousey evens up the score and matches Jessamyn Duke against Pennington.

Episode 6: "Little Princesses" (October 9, 2013)

- Julianna Peña gives Pennington and Sarah Moras makeovers which she calls her "little princesses."
- The fighters take a break by going on a roadtrip to Green Valley Ranch where the Hooters girls set up private catering poolside.
- Duke decides to stay at the house to shadowbox and focus on her fight.
- Anthony Gutierrez annoys the female fighters in the house with his personality and crazy antics while they are sleeping.
- Tate brings in two time Muay Thai world champion and Hall of Famer, Melchor Menor, to coach Pennington with her anti-clinch game.
- Raquel Pennington defeated Jessamyn Duke via unanimous decision in three rounds.
- After a strong first round by Duke, Pennington shut down Duke's forward kicking and closed distance for more effective striking.
- Rousey, Tate, White, and all the fighters expressed how intense and close the fight was as well as deep respect for both Pennington and Duke as fighters. This ended up being the fight of the season.
- Having regained matchmaking control, Tate announces the next match: Josh Hill vs. Michael Wootten.

Episode 7: "Zone In" (October 16, 2013)

- Rousey visits the fighter house to deliver gifts for all the fighting fathers on Father's Day.
- Team Tate plays another prank on Edmond Tarverdyan when they put pictures of Missi Pyle as Fran from Dodgeball entitled, "Edmond Rousey" up all over the gym, grabbing White's attention. White then takes it upon himself to take down all the pictures so another war between the teams does not ignite again, but fails to remove all the pictures.
- Rousey finds out and goes ballistic, calling the prank and Tate and her trainers racists due to the nature of facial stereotypes of Armenians.
- Michael Wootten defeated Josh Hill via unanimous decision in three rounds.
- Tate goes over to Rousey and her trainers to shake hands and once again, they flip the bird. Rousey says that Tate is acting like a "fake bitch" by insulting her behind her back and then being nice to her face. Rousey then calls it a battle of "fake nice vs. real mean."
- Rousey is back in control and picks the last two preliminary match-ups: Peggy Morgan vs. Sarah Moras, and then Anthony Gutierrez vs. Cody Bollinger.

Episode 8: "Tied" (October 23, 2013)

- White, Rousey, Tate and the fighters recap the season's highs and lows so far.
- Interviews with the coaches and fighters are shown.
- Match highlights from the previous fights are also shown.
- Rousey and Tate's disputes throughout the season are discussed, including Rousey's constant flipping of the bird.

Episode 9: "Sacrifice" (October 30, 2013)

- Team Tate's first pick Cody Bollinger mentally breaks down and decides to quit after not making weight before his fight.
- White calls both teams out to the floor for Bollinger's announcement and expels him from the show directly after.
- The coaches are called in to White's office to discuss what happened with Bollinger. Tate explains she tried to help him, causing Rousey to remark that if it was one of her fighters, she would take the blame.
- The fighting commission decides to either forfeit the match or have Anthony Gutierrez fight Chris Beal, who was selected as the wildcard.
- Gutierrez decides not to cut weight again for another fight and goes the easier route with forfeit to go into the semifinals.
- Sarah Moras defeated Peggy Morgan via submission (armbar) at 4:39 in the first round.
- To White's surprise, both coaches agree on the men's and women's semifinal match-ups: Chris Holdsworth vs. Michael Wootten; Julianna Peña against Moras; Davey Grant against Gutierrez; Raquel Pennington vs. Jessica Rakoczy.

Episode 10: "HWPO" (November 6, 2013)

- Rousey stops by the fighter house to bring her team's fighters some fast food, and also mixes drinks and shares shots with them.
- Meanwhile, Sarah Moras discusses with her fellow Team Tate semifinalist Raquel Pennington that she feels like she is the underdog and Julianna Peña, who trains with Tate, is their team favorite, making her feel left out of her much-needed personal training, as the rest of the team believe Holdsworth is their "golden boy" favorite.
- Holdsworth and Wootten have different reactions leading up to their fight. Holdsworth alienates himself from the rest of the fighters, only concentrating on his mind and body, while Wootten is struggling mentally and feels fatigued and homesick being away from his family.
- The semifinalist fighters and coaches take a trip to the local Harley Davidson dealership for their "motorcycle boot camp" by testing out their potential rides and also go shopping for new gear.
- A surprise guest rider shows up and it turns out to be UFC heavyweight champion, Cain Velasquez, who gives the fighters some words of encouragement.
- Rousey shows off her strength by lifting a motorcycle as demonstrated by the Harley rep.
- Tate decides to Silly String her team to loosen the tension. She also brings in former Central Washington University wrestler turned motivational speaker Kenny Salvini. He had a severe accident while snowboarding that rendered him quadriplegic and talks to the team about overcoming setbacks in life.
- TUF Season 5 winner and Brazilian jiu jitsu blackbelt, Nate Diaz, is invited by Rousey to help her team train their BJJ techniques.
- Chris Holdsworth defeated Michael Wootten by submission (rear naked choke) at 3:11 in the first round.
- Holdworth dedicates his win to his mentor, UFC legend Royce Gracie, and says his motto, H.W.P.O. ("Hard Work Pays Off").

Episode 11: "Mean Girls" (November 13, 2013)

- The charges of favoritism continue towards Peña and it disrupts Moras' training, making the Canadian feel "out of the loop," and her teammates turn against Peña at the house.
- Tate put Moras self doubts to rest when she says that she will remove herself from coaching, and Bryan Caraway and the rest of the trainers will get more involved and try to help her by having separate coaches and corners for each fighter.
- Roommates Raquel Pennington and Peña become agitated towards each other as the close quarters, daily routines and monotony of the house sets in. This causes Peña to call all the female fighters "Mean Girls," after the Lindsay Lohan film.
- Rousey stops by the TUF house wanting to personalize the female fighters' UFC T-shirts by cutting them up to make holes for ventilation which everyone dubs getting your shirt "Rondafied."
- Tate also visits the house before the fights and has a discussion with Peña. She is honest in saying there may be some favoritism towards Peña, but claims it is because she is the hardest working and most willing-to-learn female fighter on the team.
- Julianna Peña defeated Sarah Moras by submission (guillotine choke) at 3:31 in the second round.
- Tearful and frustrated in losing, Moras apologizes for her lackluster performance to White and thanks him for being on the show.

Episode 12: "One Punch Away" (November 20, 2013)

- Rousey and her trainers visit the fighter house to have an Armenian barbecue with TUF season 5 runner-up Manvel "Manny" Gamburyan doing the grilling for all the fighters. But with their fight coming up, Davey Grant only has a tiny bite to eat while Anthony Gutierrez, not worrying about making weight, downs his meal asking for seconds.
- The feud between Rousey and Tate reaches new heights when they are tasked at racing up an indoor rock climbing wall during the Coaches' Challenge. Rousey and Tate were neck and neck until the champion pulled ahead at the end to win her team $10,000 ($1,500 each), and also beating Tate once again in the process, as she screams "fuck you bitch!" and flips the bird on the way back down.
- Gutierrez is constantly scrutinized by his coaches and teammates about his eating habits. He responds by claiming that "they are jealous and wish they could eat like [him]."
- However, the morning of the weigh-ins, Gutierrez weighs 145 lb. He tries an Epsom salt bath, running on the treadmill with a plastic sweatsuit, and the sauna, but can only get down to 140 lb.
- Gutierrez got a bye into the semifinals when he was scheduled to fight Cody Bollinger who missed weight. Gutierrez would find himself in a similar situation this time around when he was scheduled to face Grant.
- Gutierrez was unable to make weight and Gamburyan lectured him about how big of a mistake he made, and that the UFC was too high a level for him.
- White then expelled Gutierrez from the show and gave Grant a direct advance into the finale to fight against Chris Holdsworth.
- After Gutierrez's expulsion, Rousey felt that it was her fault that he missed weight and that the following day, she will make weight to show her team how to properly make weight.
- White responded saying that Gutierrez has no heart and that the competition weeds out the weak. He also says Gutierrez should get a regular job and make MMA his hobby.
- This is the first time in TUF history that two fighters in the same season missed weight.

Episode 13: "Aiming For the Top" (November 27, 2013)

- The last semifinals female match between Pennington and Rakoczy does not go off without a hitch, when both fighters get injured during training leading up to the fight.
- Pennington hurts her right hand grappling Louis Fisette, and Rakoczy injures her shoulder sparring with Chris Beal.
- Jessica Rakoczy defeated Raquel Pennington by unanimous decision in three rounds.
- Rakoczy dominated Pennington with her boxing skills in the last two rounds and defended well against Pennington's takedown attempts, much to everyone's surprise since she was considered one-dimensional.
- Being that both fighters had pro boxing matches under their belts and it was expected be a slugfest, White expressed that this fight was not what he thought it was going to be and he does not know what happened to Pennington's head after mixing it up with Rakoczy in the first round.
- Tate could not help but cry with Pennington after her loss.
- The finalists fighting in the TUF finale at the Mandalay Bay are; for the men: Chris Holdsworth vs. Davey Grant and for the women: Rakoczy will face Julianna Peña.
- Since Rousey flipped Tate off the entire season, Tate decides to give the judoka a parting gift of a pair of socks that have the middle finger on it. But when she holds them up in front of Rousey's face during their stare-down, the champion smacks the socks out of Tate's hand and continues the staredown, as her adversary blows her a kiss a few seconds later.

== Tournament Bracket ==
=== Female Fighters ===
Elimination Round
2 Shayna Baszler	2
1 Julianna Peña	SUB
6 Peggy Morgan	1
3 Sarah Moras	SUB
4 Jessamyn Duke	3
5 Raquel Pennington	UD
8 Jessica Rakoczy	TKO
7 Roxanne Modafferi	2

Semi-finals
1 Julianna Peña	SUB
3 Sarah Moras	2
5 Raquel Pennington	3
8 Jessica Rakoczy	UD

Finale
1 Julianna Peña	TKO
8 Jessica Rakoczy	1

=== Male Fighters ===
Elimination Round
2 Chris Beal	1
3 Chris Holdsworth	SUB
8 Michael Wootten	UD
5 Josh Hill	3
4 Davey Grant	SUB
7 Louis Fisette	2
6 Anthony Gutierrez	*
1 Cody Bollinger	-

Semi-finals
3 Chris Holdsworth	SUB
8 Michael Wootten	1
4 Davey Grant	**
6 Anthony Gutierrez

Finale
3 Chris Holdsworth	SUB
4 Davey Grant	2

* Bollinger did not make weight and was expelled. Gutierrez advanced directly to the semifinals.
** Gutierrez did not make weight and was expelled. Grant advanced directly to the finale.

Legend
	Team Rousey
	Team Tate
UD	Unanimous Decision
SUB	Submission
TKO	Technical Knockout

=== Bonus awards ===
Fans voted to award the following $25,000 bonus awards to fights that took place during the TUF 18 season:

- Fight of the Season: Jessamyn Duke vs. Raquel Pennington
- Knockout of the Season: Jessica Rakoczy
- Submission of the Season: Sarah Moras

== The Ultimate Fighter 18 Finale ==
The Ultimate Fighter: Team Rousey vs. Team Tate Finale
- The poster for The Ultimate Fighter: Team Rousey vs. Team Tate Finale
- Promotion: Ultimate Fighting Championship
- Date: November 30, 2013
- Venue: Mandalay Bay Events Center
- City: Las Vegas, Nevada
- Attendance: 4,853
- Total gate: $322,742.50

Event chronology
UFC 167: St-Pierre vs. Hendricks	The Ultimate Fighter: Team Rousey vs. Team Tate Finale	UFC Fight Night: Hunt vs. Bigfoot

The Ultimate Fighter: Team Rousey vs. Team Tate Finale (also known as The Ultimate Fighter 18 Finale) was a mixed martial arts event held by the Ultimate Fighting Championship. It took place on November 30, 2013, at the Mandalay Bay Events Center in Las Vegas, Nevada.

=== Background ===
The event was expected to be headlined by a UFC Flyweight Championship bout between the current champion Demetrious Johnson and top contender Joseph Benavidez. The two previously met at UFC 152 in the finals of the inaugural Flyweight Tournament, with Johnson winning the bout via split decision. However, on November 10, it was announced that Anthony Pettis withdrew from the main event on UFC on Fox 9 and the Johnson/Benavidez bout was moved to that event.

Featured on the card were the finals from The Ultimate Fighter: Team Rousey vs. Team Tate in both men's and women's bantamweight divisions.

Zak Cummings was originally scheduled to face Sérgio Moraes, but withdrew due to injury. He was replaced by Sean Spencer, but Moraes would also pull out and Drew Dober would replace him.

Josh Sampo missed the 126 lb weight limit at the weigh ins and forfeited 10% of his purse as a penalty.

=== Results ===
Main card (Fox Sports 1)
Weight class				Method	Round	Time	Notes
Lightweight	Nate Diaz	def.	Gray Maynard	TKO (punches)	1	2:38
Women's Bantamweight	Julianna Peña	def.	Jessica Rakoczy	TKO (punches and elbows)	1	4:59	(Note: TUF 18 Women's Bantamweight Tournament Final)
Bantamweight	Chris Holdsworth	def.	Davey Grant	Submission (rear-naked choke)	2	2:10	(Note: TUF 18 Men's Bantamweight Tournament Final)
Women's Bantamweight	Jessamyn Duke	def.	Peggy Morgan	Decision (unanimous) (30–27, 30–27, 30–27)	3	5:00
Women's Bantamweight	Raquel Pennington	def.	Roxanne Modafferi	Decision (unanimous) (30–27, 30–27, 29–28)	3	5:00
Preliminary card (Fox Sports 1)
Featherweight	Akira Corassani	def.	Maximo Blanco	Disqualification (illegal knee)	1	0:25
Featherweight	Tom Niinimäki	def.	Rani Yahya	Decision (split) (29–28, 28–29, 30–27)	3	5:00
Heavyweight	Jared Rosholt	def.	Walt Harris	Decision (unanimous) (29–28, 29–28, 29–28)	3	5:00
Welterweight	Sean Spencer	def.	Drew Dober	Decision (unanimous) (30–27, 30–27, 30–27)	3	5:00
Preliminary card (Facebook)
Catchweight (127.5 lb)	Josh Sampo	def.	Ryan Benoit	Submission (rear-naked choke)	2	4:31

=== Bonus awards ===
The following fighters received $50,000 bonuses. (Sampo was not awarded a bonus as a penalty for missing weight and the bonus money he would have won was forfeited to Benoit. Benoit was awarded a $100,000 bonus as a result.)

- Fight of the Night: Josh Sampo vs. Ryan Benoit
- Knockout of the Night: Nate Diaz
- Submission of the Night: Chris Holdsworth

=== Reported payout ===
The following is the reported payout to the fighters as reported to the Nevada State Athletic Commission. It does not include sponsor money and also does not include the UFC's traditional "fight night" bonuses.

- Nate Diaz: $30,000 (includes $15,000 win bonus) def. Gray Maynard: $45,000
- Julianna Peña: $16,000 (includes $8,000 win bonus) def. Jessica Rakoczy: $8,000
- Chris Holdsworth: $16,000 (includes $8,000 win bonus) def. Davey Grant: $8,000
- Jessamyn Duke: $16,000 (includes $8,000 win bonus) def. Peggy Morgan: $8,000
- Raquel Pennington: $16,000 (includes $8,000 win bonus) def. Roxanne Modaferri: $8,000
- Akira Corassani: $16,000 (includes $8,000 win bonus) def. Maximo Blanco: $17,000
- Tom Niinimäki: $16,000 (includes $8,000 win bonus) def. Rani Yahya: $20,000
- Jared Rosholt: $16,000 (includes $8,000 win bonus) def. Walter Harris: $8,000
- Sean Spencer: $16,000 (includes $8,000 win bonus) def. Drew Dober: $8,000
- Josh Sampo: $16,000 (includes $8,000 win bonus) def. Ryan Benoit: $8,000 ^

^Josh Sampo was reportedly fined 10% of his purse for failing to make the required weight for his fight. The Nevada State Athletic Commission's initial report did not include information on the penalty.

== Coaches' Fight ==
UFC 168: Weidman vs. Silva 2 was held on December 28, 2013, in Las Vegas, Nevada.

- Women's Bantamweight Championship bout: (United States) Ronda Rousey (c) vs. (United States) Miesha Tate

Ronda Rousey (c) defeated Miesha Tate via submission (armbar) after :58 in the third round.

== See also ==
- The Ultimate Fighter
- List of current UFC fighters
- List of UFC events
- 2013 in UFC
