= Roxanne Modafferi =

American mixed martial artist (born 1982)

Roxanne Roman
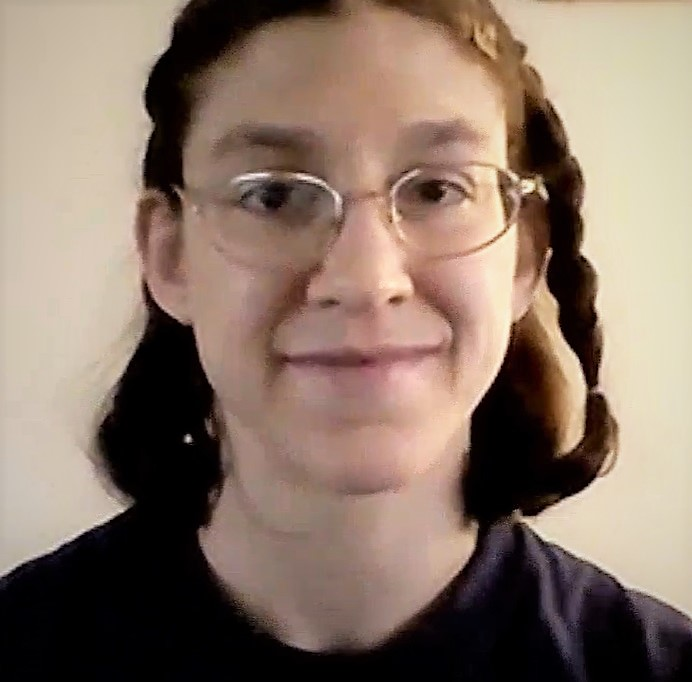
- Roman on "The Unknown Room" in 2019
- Born: Roxanne Vincenta Modafferi; September 24, 1982 (age 44); Wilmington, Delaware, United States
- Other names: The Happy Warrior
- Height: 5 ft 6 in (168 cm)
- Weight: 125 lb (57 kg; 8 st 13 lb)
- Division: Flyweight
- Reach: 69 in (175 cm)
- Fighting out of: Las Vegas, Nevada
- Team: Syndicate MMA (2013–present)
- Rank: Black belt in Brazilian Jiu-Jitsu under Mike Pyle and Evan Dunham; Brown belt in Judo
- Years active: 2003–2022 (MMA)

Mixed martial arts record
- Total: 45
- Wins: 25
- By knockout: 4
- By submission: 5
- By decision: 16
- Losses: 20
- By knockout: 1
- By submission: 3
- By decision: 16

Other information
- University: University of Massachusetts
- Mixed martial arts record from Sherdog

Roxanne Vincenta Roman (née Modafferi) (born September 24, 1982) is an American retired mixed martial artist, who most recently fought for the UFC. Though she last fought in the flyweight division, she has fought in multiple weight classes in her career. She has been a professional competitor since 2003.

== Biography ==
Roman is of Italian and Lithuanian descent. Roman's training began in Taekwondo at the age of 13 in Pennsylvania, moving on to Mark Lawler's Kenpō Karate in the high school. She then began attending the Dalton Judo Club in Pittsfield, Massachusetts. Her description of that experience was: "I thought I was all cool doing Karate, like the movie stars, but then in Judo I learned what it was like to fly." She trained for three years to gain a brown belt in the style, and then graduated from Lenox Memorial High School. Before leaving home to study at the University of Massachusetts Amherst, a fellow brown belt brought Modafferi to a Royce Gracie Brazilian Jiu Jitsu association in Adams, Massachusetts, where she trained intensively for three months.

Modafferi majored in Japanese Language and Literature with a minor in Linguistics at the University of Massachusetts. While at college, she found the Amherst Athletic club, where New England Submission Fighting is based. In addition, she trained at another Royce Gracie association in Hartford, Connecticut, for about a year (necessitating a weekly two-hour round trip), also investigating Jeremy Libiszewski's School of Self-Defence in Wilbraham, Massachusetts. During summer vacations in Boston, she trained at Joao Amaral's New England BJJ club, now associated with Brazilian Top Team. Modafferi says, "Those guys are tough as concrete is hard, and beat my weaknesses out of me when they found them." To work on her striking, she also attended the Sityodtong Muay Thai Academy's North American branch in Somerville, Massachusetts, run by Kru Mark DellaGrotte.

She is now a member of the Syndicate MMA team.

== Mixed martial arts career ==
=== International career ===
Modafferi spent September 2003 to June 2004, her junior year, in Tokyo, Japan. This enabled her to compete in a number of NHB and BJJ competitions. She achieved a 3–0 mixed martial arts record in the Smackgirl promotion and defeated Jennifer Howe.

In Japan, she trained at the Cross Point club in Kichijouji, which taught both Muay Thai and BJJ. She hopes to one day write a book about her experiences during that time, having already contributed several articles on the topic. After graduating in May 2005, she secured a position with Berlitz, teaching English in Japan and arriving for the second time in July 2005.

Modafferi earned a win by split decision against Cassandra Rivers-Blasso at Fatal Femmes Fighting on February 2, 2007. She became K-GRACE Women's Open-Weight Tournament Champion by defeating Hee Jin Lee, Megumi Yabushita and Marloes Coenen on May 27, 2007.

Roxanne defended her FFF title against Vanessa Porto at FFF 4 – Call of the Wild on April 3, 2008. She won the fight by TKO in the third round.

She signed a contract with the American Fight League (AFL) and was scheduled to face Tara LaRosa at the AFL's November event, but fought instead at the debut Valkyrie event in Japan after the AFL's plans stalled.

=== Strikeforce ===
Modafferi moved up a weight class and made her long-awaited Strikeforce debut in a rematch with Marloes Coenen at Strikeforce: Fedor vs. Rogers on November 7, 2009, but lost the fight by armbar in the first round.

=== Independent promotions ===
On January 30, 2010, Modafferi submitted Molly Helsel in the second round at King of the Cage: Toryumon in Okinawa, Japan.

Modafferi rematched Tara LaRosa at Moosin: God of Martial Arts on May 21, 2010. Strikeforce provided official permission for Modafferi to compete on the card. Modafferi won the fight by split decision.

=== Strikeforce return ===
Modafferi returned to Strikeforce to challenge Sarah Kaufman at Strikeforce Challengers: del Rosario vs. Mahe on July 23, 2010. She lost the fight via knockout due to a slam in the third round.

Modafferi was released by Strikeforce on November 12, 2010, after losing both her fights with the promotion. She was scheduled to face Hitomi Akano at World Victory Road Presents: Soul of Fight on December 30, 2010, but the fight was cancelled after Modafferi suffered a stomach illness and was unable to compete.

=== International return ===
Modafferi faced Rosi Sexton at Cage Warriors Fighting Championship 40 on February 26, 2011. The fight was Modafferi's debut at 125 pounds. She was defeated by unanimous decision.

Modafferi then faced Hitomi Akano in a bout rescheduled for Jewels 15th Ring on July 9, 2011. She was defeated by unanimous decision.

Modafferi was scheduled to face Aisling Daly at BlackEye Promotions 5 in Fletcher, North Carolina, on October 1, 2011. However, Daly was forced to withdraw from the card and Modafferi faced Barb Honchak instead. She was defeated by submission due to a rear-naked choke in the third round.

On February 10, 2012, it was announced that Modafferi would face Takayo Hashi at Jewels 18th Ring on March 3 in Tokyo. She was defeated by unanimous decision.

Modafferi was set to face Shizuka Sugiyama at Jewels 22nd Ring on December 15, 2012. However, she suffered a neck injury in training and withdrew from the fight on December 13.

=== The Ultimate Fighter 18 ===
In August 2013, it was announced that Modafferi was one of the fighters selected to be on The Ultimate Fighter: Team Rousey vs. Team Tate. In the elimination fight to get into the TUF house, Modafferi faced Valérie Létourneau and won via a rear-naked choke submission in the first round. She later lost her first tournament fight to Jessica Rakoczy.

=== Ultimate Fighting Championship ===
In November 2013, it was announced that Modafferi would make her official UFC debut against fellow TUF 18 alumni Raquel Pennington at The Ultimate Fighter 18 Finale on November 30. She lost the fight via unanimous decision (30-27, 30-27, 29-28).

=== Invicta FC ===
Modafferi met Tara LaRosa for the third time at Invicta FC 8 on Saturday, September 6, 2014. The event was the first Invicta event to air exclusively on UFC Fight Pass. Modafferi won the fight via unanimous decision, ending her 6 fight losing streak with her first win in four years. She followed this up with a split decision win over Andrea Lee at Invicta FC 10 on Friday, December 5, 2014.

Modafferi faced Vanessa Porto at Invicta FC 12 on Friday, April 24, 2015. She lost the fight via unanimous decision. Modafferi faced Mariana Morais at Invicta FC 14: Evinger vs. Kianzad on Saturday, September 12, 2015, and won via TKO stoppage in the third round. Modafferi brought her Invicta FC record to 4-1 with a win over DeAnna Bennett in March 2016 at Invicta FC 16. She was later announced to be challenging Jennifer Maia for the Invicta FC Flyweight championship at Invicta FC 19 on September 23, 2016. The fight was Modafferi's first title fight in the Invicta FC promotion.

=== The Ultimate Fighter 26 ===
In August 2017, it was announced that Modafferi would be one of the fighters featured on The Ultimate Fighter 26, where the process to crown the UFC's inaugural 125-pound women's champion will take place.

In the opening round, Modafferi faced Shana Dobson and won by TKO due to punches in the first round, allowing her to move on to the next stage of the competition. In the quarterfinals, Modafferi faced Emily Whitmire and won the fight via technical knockout in round one. In the semifinals, Modafferi faced Sijara Eubanks and she lost via unanimous decision after three rounds.

=== UFC return ===
Modafferi was scheduled to face fellow semifinalist Barb Honchak on December 1, 2017, at The Ultimate Fighter 26 Finale. However, on the day of the weigh in, Sijara Eubanks was pulled from the fight for kidney failure and was replaced by Modafferi to face Nicco Montaño for the Flyweight title. She lost the fight via unanimous decision. The fight earned her the Fight of the Night bonus.

The rematch between Modafferi and Barb Honchak was rescheduled to take place July 6, 2018, at The Ultimate Fighter 27 Finale. Modafferi won the fight via technical knockout in round two.

Modafferi faced Sijara Eubanks at UFC 230 on November 3, 2018. At the weigh-ins, Eubanks weight at 127.2 pounds, 1.2 pounds over the flyweight non-title fight limit of 126 and she was fined 20 percent of her purse, which went to her opponent Modafferi. She lost the fight via unanimous decision.

Modafferi faced Antonina Shevchenko on April 20, 2019, at UFC on ESPN+ 7. She won the fight via split decision. The victory earned Modafferi the distinction of being the first female UFC fighter to win a bout in Russia.

Modafferi was expected to face Liz Carmouche on July 20, 2019, at UFC on ESPN 4. However, Carmouche was pulled from that bout in favor of a rematch with current champion Valentina Shevchenko in August at UFC Fight Night 156. Modaffer then faced Jennifer Maia in a rematch of their 2016 Invicta FC Flyweight Championship bout, which Maia won via split decision. At the weigh-ins, Maia weighed in at 129 pounds, 3 pounds over the women's flyweight non-title fight limit of 126. As a result she was fined 30 percent of her purse, and the bout proceeded as scheduled at a catchweight. Modafferi lost the fight via unanimous decision.

Modafferi faced Maycee Barber on January 18, 2020, at UFC 246. Modafferi won the one-sided fight by unanimous decision.

Modafferi faced Lauren Murphy on June 20, 2020, at UFC Fight Night: Blaydes vs. Volkov. She lost the fight by unanimous decision.

Modafferi faced Andrea Lee on September 12, 2020, at UFC Fight Night 177. She won the fight via unanimous decision.

Modafferi was briefly scheduled to face Viviane Araújo on January 30, 2021, at UFC on ESPN 20. However, the fight was rescheduled and took place 10 days earlier at UFC Fight Night 185 instead. She lost the fight via unanimous decision.

Modafferi was scheduled to face Taila Santos on May 8, 2021, at UFC on ESPN 24. However, Modafferi was forced to pull out from the event citing a meniscus tear.

Modafferi was expected to face Tatiana Suarez on September 25, 2021, at UFC 266. However, Suarez was pulled from the event due to injury, and she was replaced by Taila Santos She lost the fight via unanimous decision.

Modafferi faced Casey O'Neill on February 12, 2022, at UFC 271. On November 4, 2021, she announced via Instagram that this would be her final MMA fight. She lost the fight via split decision and retired. 19 out of 19 media scores gave it to O'Neill.

== Professional grappling career ==
Modafferi competed in the first women's divisions at the ADCC World Championships on May 27 and 28, 2005. She lost to Alessandra 'Leka' Vieira in the opening round of the under 60 kg division.

On October 25, 2020, Modafferi faced Danielle Kelly in the main event of Submission Hunter Pro 60 for the inaugural 130 lbs no gi title and was submitted with a toehold.

Modafferi was given the opportunity to challenge Amanda Loewen for the SUG absolute title at Submission Underground 21 on March 28, 2021. Neither woman was able to win during regulation time and the match went to EBI overtime, with Loewen winning by armbar at 0:59 of the first round of overtime.

Modafferi faced Michele Oliveira in a superfight at UFC Fightpass Invitational 2 on July 3, 2022, and lost a decision.

== Writing ==
Modafferri writes a regular column titled Dear Roxy for MMA website Bloody Elbow. She is also an author and has published two books, How to be Positive: Mental Training by the Happy Warrior and Memoirs of a Happy Warrior.

== Personal life ==
Modafferi married fellow MMA fighter Chris Roman on October 16, 2022. On March 2, 2024 she revealed that she was pregnant with her first child. On July 21, she posted that she had given birth to a son, Maximus Edwin Roman.

== Championships and accomplishments ==
=== Mixed martial arts ===
- Ultimate Fighting Championship
  - Fight of the Night (One time) vs. Nicco Montaño
  - UFC.com Awards
    - 2019: Ranked #4 Upset of the Year vs. Antonina Shevchenko
    - 2020: Upset of the Year vs. Maycee Barber
- International Sport Karate Association
  - ISKA Women's World Middleweight Championship (One time)
- International Fighting Championships
  - IFC Women's Middleweight Championship (One time)
- Fatal Femmes Fighting
  - FFF Women's Lightweight Championship (two times)
- K-GRACE
  - K-GRACE Women's Openweight Tournament Winner
- Smackgirl
  - Smackgirl World ReMix 2004 Openweight Tournament Semifinalist
- AwakeningFighters.com WMMA Awards
  - 2014 Flyweight of the Year
- Sherdog
  - 2020 Upset of the Year vs. Maycee Barber
- ESPN
  - 2020 Upset of the Year vs. Maycee Barber at UFC 246

=== Submission grappling ===
- North American Grappling Association
  - 2002 North American Grappling Association Fighter of the Year
- Abu Dhabi Combat Club
  - 2005 ADCC Submission Wrestling World Championships -60 kg Quarterfinalist

== Mixed martial arts record ==
Professional record breakdown
45 matches	25 wins	20 losses
By knockout	4	1
By submission	5	3
By decision	16	16

Res.	Record	Opponent	Method	Event	Date	Round	Time	Location	Notes
Loss	25–20	Casey O'Neill	Decision (split)	UFC 271	February 12, 2022	3	5:00	Houston, Texas, United States	Retired after bout
Loss	25–19	Taila Santos	Decision (unanimous)	UFC 266	September 25, 2021	3	5:00	Las Vegas, Nevada, United States	
Loss	25–18	Viviane Araújo	Decision (unanimous)	UFC on ESPN: Chiesa vs. Magny	January 20, 2021	3	5:00	Abu Dhabi, United Arab Emirates	
Win	25–17	Andrea Lee	Decision (unanimous)	UFC Fight Night: Waterson vs. Hill	September 12, 2020	3	5:00	Las Vegas, Nevada, United States	
Loss	24–17	Lauren Murphy	Decision (unanimous)	UFC on ESPN: Blaydes vs. Volkov	June 20, 2020	3	5:00	Las Vegas, Nevada, United States	
Win	24–16	Maycee Barber	Decision (unanimous)	UFC 246	January 18, 2020	3	5:00	Las Vegas, Nevada, United States	
Loss	23–16	Jennifer Maia	Decision (unanimous)	UFC on ESPN: dos Anjos vs. Edwards	July 20, 2019	3	5:00	San Antonio, Texas, United States	Catchweight (129 lb) bout; Maia missed weight.
Win	23–15	Antonina Shevchenko	Decision (split)	UFC Fight Night: Overeem vs. Oleinik	April 20, 2019	3	5:00	Saint Petersburg, Russia	
Loss	22–15	Sijara Eubanks	Decision (unanimous)	UFC 230	November 3, 2018	3	5:00	New York City, New York, United States	Catchweight (127.2 lb) bout; Eubanks missed weight.
Win	22–14	Barb Honchak	TKO (elbows)	The Ultimate Fighter: Undefeated Finale	July 6, 2018	2	3:32	Las Vegas, Nevada, United States	
Loss	21–14	Nicco Montaño	Decision (unanimous)	The Ultimate Fighter: A New World Champion Finale	December 1, 2017	5	5:00	Las Vegas, Nevada, United States	For the inaugural UFC Women's Flyweight Championship. Fight of the Night.
Win	21–13	Sarah D'Alelio	TKO (elbows)	Invicta FC 23: Porto vs. Niedźwiedź	May 20, 2017	3	1:37	Kansas City, Missouri, United States	
Win	20–13	Priscila de Souza	Submission (armbar)	Fusion Fight League: Ladies Fight Night	April 1, 2017	2	4:52	Billings, Montana, United States	Won the FFL Flyweight Championship.
Loss	19–13	Jennifer Maia	Decision (split)	Invicta FC 19: Maia vs. Modafferi	September 23, 2016	5	5:00	Kansas City, Missouri, United States	For the Invicta FC Flyweight Championship. Fight of the Night.
Win	19–12	DeAnna Bennett	Decision (split)	Invicta FC 16: Hamasaki vs. Brown	March 11, 2016	3	5:00	Las Vegas, Nevada, United States	
Win	18–12	Mariana Morais	TKO (punches)	Invicta FC 14: Evinger vs. Kianzad	September 12, 2015	3	4:40	Kansas City, Missouri, United States	
Loss	17–12	Vanessa Porto	Decision (unanimous)	Invicta FC 12: Kankaanpää vs. Souza	April 24, 2015	3	5:00	Kansas City, Missouri, United States	
Win	17–11	Andrea Lee	Decision (split)	Invicta FC 10: Waterson vs. Tiburcio	December 5, 2014	3	5:00	Houston, Texas, United States	
Win	16–11	Tara LaRosa	Decision (unanimous)	Invicta FC 8: Waterson vs. Tamada	September 6, 2014	3	5:00	Kansas City, Missouri, United States	
Loss	15–11	Raquel Pennington	Decision (unanimous)	The Ultimate Fighter: Team Rousey vs. Team Tate Finale	November 30, 2013	3	5:00	Las Vegas, Nevada, United States	Bantamweight bout.
Loss	15–10	Takayo Hashi	Decision (unanimous)	Jewels 18th Ring	March 3, 2012	2	5:00	Koto, Japan	Catchweight (127 lb) bout.
Loss	15–9	Barb Honchak	Submission (rear-naked choke)	BEP 5: Breast Cancer Beatdown	October 1, 2011	3	1:46	Fletcher, North Carolina, United States	
Loss	15–8	Hitomi Akano	Decision (unanimous)	Jewels 15th Ring	July 9, 2011	2	5:00	Kabukicho, Japan	Bantamweight bout.
Loss	15–7	Rosi Sexton	Decision (unanimous)	Cage Warriors: 40	February 26, 2011	3	5:00	North London, England	Flyweight debut.
Loss	15–6	Sarah Kaufman	KO (slam)	Strikeforce Challengers: del Rosario vs. Mahe	July 23, 2010	3	4:45	Everett, Washington, United States	For the Strikeforce Women's Bantamweight Championship.
Win	15–5	Tara LaRosa	Decision (split)	Moosin: God of Martial Arts	May 21, 2010	3	5:00	Worcester, Massachusetts, United States	Catchweight (130 lb) bout.
Win	14–5	Molly Helsel	Submission (rear-naked choke)	KOTC: Toryumon	January 30, 2010	2	3:18	Okinawa, Japan	
Loss	13–5	Marloes Coenen	Submission (armbar)	Strikeforce: Fedor vs. Rogers	November 7, 2009	1	1:05	Hoffman Estates, Illinois, United States	Featherweight bout.
Win	13–4	Chisa Yonezawa	Decision (unanimous)	Valkyrie 01	November 8, 2008	2	3:00	Tokyo, Japan	Bantamweight bout.
Win	12–4	Vanessa Porto	TKO (knees)	Fatal Femmes Fighting 4: Call of the Wild	April 3, 2008	3	0:53	Los Angeles, California, United States	Defended the FFF Lightweight Championship.
Win	11–4	Marloes Coenen	Decision (split)	K-GRACE 1	May 27, 2007	2	3:00	Tokyo, Japan	K-GRACE Women's Openweight Tournament Final.
Win	10–4	Megumi Yabushita	Decision (unanimous)	K-GRACE 1	May 27, 2007	2	3:00	Tokyo, Japan	K-GRACE Women's Openweight Tournament Semifinal.
Win	9–4	Hee Jin Lee	Submission (armbar)	K-GRACE 1	May 27, 2007	1	2:56	Tokyo, Japan	K-GRACE Women's Openweight Tournament Quarterfinal.
Win	8–4	Cassandra Rivers-Blasso	Decision (split)	Fatal Femmes Fighting 1: Asian Invasion	January 17, 2007	5	2:00	Los Angeles, California, United States	Won the FFF Lightweight Championship.
Loss	7–4	Shayna Baszler	Submission (hammerlock)	MARS: BodogFIGHT	October 4, 2006	1	1:08	Tokyo, Japan	
Win	7–3	Megumi Yabushita	Decision (unanimous)	G-Shooto: G-Shooto 05	May 6, 2006	2	5:00	Tokyo, Japan	
Loss	6–3	Tara LaRosa	Decision (unanimous)	Mix Fighting Championships: Boardwalk Blitz	March 4, 2006	3	5:00	Atlantic City, New Jersey, United States	
Loss	6–2	Laura D'Auguste	Decision (unanimous)	Ring of Combat 8	March 19, 2005	3	5:00	Asbury Park, New Jersey, United States	For the ROC Women's Welterweight (147 lb) Championship.
Win	6–1	Jennifer Howe	Submission (triangle choke)	International Fighting Championships: Eve of Destruction	March 5, 2005	3	1:47	Salt Lake City, Utah, United States	Won the IFC Women's Middleweight Championship.
Loss	5–1	Megumi Yabushita	Decision (unanimous)	Smackgirl: World ReMix 2004	December 19, 2004	2	5:00	Shizuoka, Japan	Smackgirl World ReMix 2004 Openweight Tournament Semifinal.
Win	5–0	Ana Carolina	Decision (unanimous)	Smackgirl: World ReMix 2004	December 19, 2004	2	5:00	Shizuoka, Japan	Smackgirl World ReMix 2004 Openweight Tournament Quarterfinal.
Win	4–0	Jennifer Howe	Decision (unanimous)	HOOKnSHOOT: Evolution	November 6, 2004	3	5:00	Evansville, Indiana, United States	
Win	3–0	Natsuko Kikukawa	Decision (unanimous)	Smackgirl: F8	May 16, 2004	3	5:00	Tokyo, Japan	
Win	2–0	Keiko Tamai	Decision (unanimous)	Greatest Common Multiple: Cross Section 1	April 18, 2004	2	5:00	Japan	
Win	1–0	Hikaru Shinohara	Submission (armbar)	Smackgirl: Third Season 7	November 10, 2003	1	1:58	Tokyo, Japan	

Exhibition record breakdown		
5 matches	3 wins	2 losses
By knockout	2	1
By submission	1	0
By decision	0	1

Res.	Record	Opponent	Method	Event	Date	Round	Time	Location	Notes
Loss	3–2	Sijara Eubanks	Decision (unanimous)	The Ultimate Fighter: A New World Champion	November 29, 2017 (air date)	3	5:00	Las Vegas, Nevada, United States	TUF 26 Semi-final round
Win	3–1	Emily Whitmire	TKO (elbows)	The Ultimate Fighter: A New World Champion	November 8, 2017 (air date)	1	4:59	Las Vegas, Nevada, United States	TUF 26 Quarter-final round
Win	2–1	Shana Dobson	TKO (elbows)	The Ultimate Fighter: A New World Champion	August 30, 2017 (air date)	1	1:37	Las Vegas, Nevada, United States	TUF 26 preliminary round
Loss	1–1	Jessica Rakoczy	TKO (slam and punches)	The Ultimate Fighter: Team Rousey vs. Team Tate	September 25, 2013 (air date)	2	2:31	Las Vegas, Nevada, United States	TUF 18 preliminary round
Win	1–0	Valérie Létourneau	Submission (rear-naked choke)	The Ultimate Fighter: Team Rousey vs. Team Tate	September 4, 2013 (air date)	1	3:36	Las Vegas, Nevada, United States	TUF 18 elimination round

== See also ==
- List of female mixed martial artists
