= Nate Moore =

American mixed martial arts fighter

- Born: April 6, 1983 (age 43); Indianapolis, Indiana, United States
- Nationality: American
- Height: 6 ft 0 in (1.83 m)
- Weight: 171 lb (78 kg; 12.2 st)
- Division: Middleweight; Welterweight
- Fighting out of: San Jose, California
- Team: American Kickboxing Academy
- Years active: 2006-2013

Mixed martial arts record
- Total: 12
- Wins: 8
- By knockout: 4
- By submission: 3
- By decision: 1
- Losses: 4
- By knockout: 2
- By submission: 1
- By decision: 1

Other information
- Mixed martial arts record from Sherdog

Nathan Gregory Moore (born April 8, 1983) is a retired American mixed martial artist. A professional from 2006 until 2013, he competed for Strikeforce.

== Background ==
Born and raised in Indianapolis, Indiana, Moore was a two-time state wrestling champion, a Junior National Freestyle Wrestling Champion, and also received All-State honors in football while attending Perry Meridian High School. Moore then attended Purdue University where he continued his wrestling career and was the team's captain. Moore also competed in the Greco-Roman category at Purdue.

== Mixed martial arts career ==
=== Early career ===
Moore compiled a professional record of 6-1 before being signed by Strikeforce.

=== Strikeforce ===
Moore made his debut for Strikeforce in 2009, defeating Louis Taylor via submission due to punches in the second round. Moore returned to Strikeforce only to lose to future Welterweight Champion Tarec Saffiedine at Strikeforce Challengers: Lindland vs. Casey via second-round knockout.

His next fight for the promotion was scheduled to be against Nathan Coy at Strikeforce: Woodley vs. Saffiedine. The fight instead took place at Strikeforce: Diaz vs. Cyborg which Moore won via KO in the second round.

Moore's next fight was against Jason High on July 14, 2012 at Strikeforce: Rockhold vs. Kennedy. He lost the fight via guillotine choke submission in the first round.

=== Independent Promotions ===
Moore most recently competed at MMA Xtreme: Fists will Fly on August 24, 2013 and lost via unanimous decision.

== Personal life ==
Moore is the founder of Combat Circuit located at American Kickboxing Academy.

== Film and television ==
Moore was featured in the award-winning mixed martial arts documentary Fight Life, the film is directed by James Z. Feng and released in 2013.

== Mixed martial arts record ==
Professional record breakdown
12 matches	8 wins	4 losses
By knockout	4	2
By submission	3	1
By decision	1	1

Res.	Record	Opponent	Method	Event	Date	Round	Time	Location	Notes
Loss	8–4	Dominique Steele	Decision (unanimous)	MMA Xtreme: Fists will Fly	August 24, 2013	3	5:00	Evansville, Indiana, United States	
Loss	8–3	Jason High	Submission (guillotine choke)	Strikeforce: Rockhold vs. Kennedy	July 14, 2012	1	0:26	Portland, Oregon, United States	
Win	8–2	Nathan Coy	KO (punches)	Strikeforce: Diaz vs. Cyborg	January 29, 2011	2	0:25	San Jose, California, United States	
Loss	7–2	Tarec Saffiedine	KO (punch)	Strikeforce Challengers: Lindland vs. Casey	May 21, 2010	2	1:21	Portland, Oregon, United States	Welterweight debut.
Win	7–1	Louis Taylor	TKO (submission to punches)	Strikeforce: Fedor vs. Rogers	November 7, 2009	2	3:24	Hoffman Estates, Illinois, United States	
Win	6–1	Charles Dera	Submission (armbar)	Pryme Time Promotions: Riot at the Hyatt	March 5, 2009	1	2:48	Westlake Village, California, United States	
Loss	5–1	Waylon Kennell	KO (knee)	Unleashed Fight	October 11, 2008	1	0:17	Alpine, California, United States	
Win	5–0	Kurt Osiander	KO (punch)	GC 80: Summer Showdown	July 18, 2008	1	0:06	San Francisco, California, United States	
Win	4–0	Elario Moreno	TKO (punches)	GC 75: Erin-Go-Brawl	March 15, 2008	1	1:25	San Francisco, California, United States	
Win	3–0	Ricco Talamantes	Submission (armbar)	United Fight League	August 11, 2007	1	1:10	Indianapolis, Indiana, United States	
Win	2–0	Rashad Dragon	TKO (submission to punches)	FightFest: Black and Blues Tour	July 6, 2007	1	4:07	Cleveland, Ohio, United States	
Win	1–0	John Troyer	Decision (unanimous)	United Fight League 2	August 6, 2006	3	5:00	Indianapolis, Indiana, United States	

== Amateur Record ==
Result	Record	Opponent	Method	Event	Date	Round	Time	Location	Notes
Win	1–0	Bo Hoffman	TKO	United Fight League 1	June 23, 2006	1	1:36	Indianapolis, Indiana	
