= Erin Toughill =

American boxer and martial artist (born 1977)

- Born: June 13, 1977 (age 49); Chicago, Illinois, U.S.
- Other names: Steel
- Height: 5 ft 10 in (1.78 m)
- Weight: 160 lb (73 kg)
- Reach: 72 in (180 cm)
- Style: Boxing
- Fighting out of: Las Vegas, Nevada, U.S.
- Team: Elite Training Center, CSW, HB Ultimate, Xtreme Couture

Professional boxing record
- Total: 14
- Wins: 7
- By knockout: 0
- Losses: 6
- Draws: 1

Mixed martial arts record
- Total: 14
- Wins: 10
- By knockout: 4
- By submission: 1
- By decision: 5
- Losses: 3
- By submission: 1
- By decision: 1
- By disqualification: 1
- Draws: 1

Other information
- Boxing record from BoxRec
- Mixed martial arts record from Sherdog

Erin Young Toughill (born June 13, 1977) is an American former professional boxer, mixed martial artist, and bare-knuckle boxer who also appeared as a Gladiator on the American Gladiators series.

She began kickboxing at the age of 18 and started training in Brazilian jiu-jitsu soon after.

Under the watch of her LA Boxing trainer Sean McCully, Toughill debuted in mixed martial arts on September 27, 1999, and fought to a draw with Irma Verhoeff at World Vale Tudo Championship 9 in Aruba.

Less than a year later, she made her professional boxing debut on July 20, 2000.

Along with her MMA career, Toughill holds a professional boxing record of 7 wins, 5 losses, 1 draw and 1 no contest.

She counts IBF Super Middleweight contender Librado Andrade, a long-time sparring partner, among her close friends.

== Boxing career ==
Toughill had only one loss before losing her against Laila Ali. Her final boxing match was against Laura Ramsey, whom she defeated previously. Toughill's father died three days before her rematch to Laura Ramsey. Toughill lost the fight by technical knockout in the first round. She and retired soon after with a record of 7–3–1, 1 NC.

Toughill returned to boxing on January 27, 2019, against Maricela Cornejo losing a unanimous decision. Toughill fought again on May 18, 2019, losing via TKO to Raquel Miller.

== Mixed martial arts career ==
After going 1–1–1 in her first three bouts, Toughill won five straight fights before losing due to illegal hits to the spine in the finals of the 2004 Smackgirl World ReMix Tournament to Megumi Yabushita. She competed once more and scored a technical knockout victory over Jen Case in 2006.

In 2007, Toughill retired from both boxing and MMA. Toughill came out of retirement from MMA and fought Jan Finney on November 20, 2008, at Palace Fighting Championships 11. Despite cutting over 20 pounds (9.1 kg) to make the contracted weight limit, Toughill was victorious and later went on to defeat Karen Williams and Emily Thompson in subsequent events for PFC after a fight with Adrienna Jenkins was cancelled due to injury.

=== Strikeforce ===
Toughill was set to make her Strikeforce debut on November 7, 2009, at Strikeforce: Fedor vs. Rogers in a rematch with Marloes Coenen, whom Toughill defeated in 2004. However, she later withdrew from the fight due to an undisclosed medical condition.

On March 18, 2010, Toughill announced that she was planning to leave Strikeforce. She had been scheduled to compete on the undercard of Strikeforce: Nashville on April 17. However, in a second posting on April 9, 2010, Toughill attributed the disagreements with Strikeforce to misunderstandings and stated that she would be staying with the promotion.

Toughill was scheduled to face Shana Olsen at Strikeforce: Houston on August 21, 2010, but the fight was cancelled due to concerns over Toughill's ability to make weight. According to Strikeforce CEO Scott Coker, Toughill's next fight will not take place in Strikeforce, but she remains a part of the promotion's roster.

Toughill was offered to face Cristiane Santos for a bout in 2010, but the fight never came into fruition.

=== Post-Strikeforce ===
Toughill was scheduled to compete outside of Strikeforce against China's Bao Yu Dan at Martial Combat 9 on September 15, 2010, in Singapore. However, on September 13, Toughill withdrew from the fight after citing a broken clavicle.

Toughill returned to active competition after nearly two years at Freestyle Cage Fighting 46 on April 9, 2011. The fight was against Ashley Sanchez at a 160 lb (73 kg) catchweight (per Toughill's request). Toughill lost the fight via unanimous decision.

Toughill agreed to face Anna Barone at BlackEye Promotions 5 on October 1, 2011, in Fletcher, North Carolina, but withdrew from the fight after suffering a rib injury in training.

== American Gladiators ==
Toughill became a cast member of NBC's primetime series, American Gladiators, where she became known as Steel.

== Bare-knuckle boxing career ==
=== BYB Extreme ===
Toughill made her bare knuckle boxing debut with BYB Extreme Bare Knuckle Fighting Series, losing a 5-round split decision to Jozette Cotton at BYB 6 at the Seminole Hard Rock Hotel and Casino, Hollywood on July 16, 2021.

On March 12, 2022, she defeated Sonya Dreiling via unanimous decision at BYB 9, improving her bare knuckle record to 1-1.

== Personal life ==
Erin married Neil Melanson, a grappling coach and lead Jiu-Jitsu instructor at Xtreme Couture, in a private ceremony on November 20, 2009. Melanson also serves as the primary grappling coach for UFC Hall of Famer Randy Couture, and has cornered Couture during several recent MMA fights. The couple is currently going through a divorce.

Toughill's younger sister, Megan, was killed in a car accident on September 19, 2004, which was about three weeks before her title fight with Yvonne Reis.

== Media ==
Toughill was featured on MSNBC's Warrior Nation as she prepared for a fight.

In 2022, Toughill launched Talk Tough with Erin Toughill, an interview-style podcast focused on bare knuckle boxing.

== Mixed martial arts record ==
Professional record breakdown
14 matches	10 wins	3 losses
By knockout	4	0
By submission	1	1
By decision	5	1
By disqualification	0	1
Draws	1	

Res.	Record	Opponent	Method	Event	Date	Round	Time	Location	Notes
Loss	10-3-1	Ashley Sanchez	Decision (unanimous)	Freestyle Cage Fighting 46	April 9, 2011	3	5:00	Shawnee, Oklahoma, United States	
Win	10-2-1	Emily Thompson	Decision (unanimous)	PFC 13: Validation	May 8, 2009	3	3:00	Lemoore, California, United States	
Win	9-2-1	Karen Williams	TKO (punches)	PFC: Best of Both Worlds	February 6, 2009	1	2:06	Lemoore, California, United States	
Win	8-2-1	Jan Finney	Decision (unanimous)	PFC 11: All In	November 20, 2008	3	3:00	Lemoore, California, United States	
Win	7-2-1	Jen Case	TKO (punches)	VF - Showdown at Cache Creek II	September 15, 2006	2	2:22	Brooks, California, United States	
Loss	6-2-1	Megumi Yabushita	DQ (elbows)	Smackgirl - World ReMix 2004	December 19, 2004	1	2:39	Shizuoka, Japan	Open Weight Queen tournament finals.
Win	6-1-1	Marloes Coenen	KO (punch)	Smackgirl - World ReMix 2004	December 19, 2004	1	5:00	Shizuoka, Japan	Open Weight Queen tournament semi-finals.
Win	5-1-1	Miwako Ishihara	TKO (corner stoppage)	Smackgirl - World ReMix 2004	December 19, 2004	1	0:27	Shizuoka, Japan	Open Weight Queen tournament first round.
Win	4-1-1	Miwako Ishihara	Decision (unanimous)	Smackgirl - Dynamic	September 1, 2002	3	5:00	Shizuoka, Japan	
Win	3-1-1	Kaoru Ito	Decision (unanimous)	W - Fusion	July 27, 2001	3	5:00	Tokyo, Japan	
Win	2-1-1	Megumi Yabushita	Technical Submission (armbar)	ReMix - Golden Gate 2001	May 3, 2001	2	3:08	Japan	
Loss	1-1-1	Svetlana Goundarenko	Submission (scarf-hold armlock)	ReMix - World Cup 2000	December 5, 2000	1	2:47	Japan	Open Weight tournament semi-finals.
Win	1-0-1	Irina Rodina	Decision (split)	ReMix - World Cup 2000	December 5, 2000	2	5:00	Japan	Open Weight tournament quarter-finals.
Draw	0-0-1	Irma Verhoeff	Draw	World Vale Tudo Championship 9	September 27, 1999	1	15:00	Aruba	

== Professional boxing record ==
13 fights	7 wins	4 losses
By knockout	0	2
By decision	7	2
Draws	1	
No contests	1	

No.	Result	Record	Opponent	Method	Round, time	Date	Location	Notes
13	Loss	7–4-1 (1)	(United States) Maricela Cornejo	UD	8	Jan 27, 2019	(United States) The Avalon Hollywood, Los Angeles, California, U.S.	
12	Loss	7–3-1 (1)	(United States) Laura Ramsey	TKO	1 (6), 1:28	Aug 31, 2006	(United States) Harveys Lake Tahoe, Stateline, Nevada, U.S.	Fight stopped after Toughill fell through ropes
11	Win	7–2-1 (1)	(United States) Laura Ramsey	UD	6	Jan 27, 2006	(United States) The Palladium, Los Angeles, California, U.S.	
10	Loss	6–2-1 (1)	(United States) Laila Ali	TKO	3 (10), 1:54	Jun 11, 2005	(United States) MCI Center, Washington, DC, U.S	
9	Win	6–1-1 (1)	(United States) Yvonne Reis	UD	10	Oct 22, 2004	(United States) Municipal Auditorium, Sarasota, Florida, U.S.	
8	Win	5–1-1 (1)	(United States) Cassandra Giger	UD	8	Jul 31, 2004	(United States) Sam's Town Casino, Tunica, Mississippi, U.S	
7	Win	4–1-1 (1)	(United States) Kuulei Kupihea	UD	4	Nov 14, 2003	(United States) Quiet Cannon, Montebello, California, U.S.	
6	Win	3–1-1 (1)	(United States) Nicole Conant	UD	4	Jul 24, 2003	(United States) Oxnard Performing Arts Center, Oxnard, California, U.S.	
5	NC	2–1-1 (1)	(United States) Jackie Frazier-Lyde	NC	3 (8)	Jun 4, 2002	(United States) The Temple Corps, Philadelphia, Pennsylvania, U.S.	For WIBF Inter-Continental super middleweight title; Fight stopped after Toughill cut from accidental head clash
4	Draw	2–1-1	(United States) Dakota Stone	PTS	4	Dec 12, 2001	(United States) Palace Indian Gaming Center, Lemoore, California, U.S.	
3	Win	2–1	(United States) Veronica Sanchez	MD	4	Oct 7, 2000	(United States) Centennial Garden Arena, Bakersfield, California, U.S.	
2	Win	1–1	(United States) Correena Grizoffi	UD	4	Aug 26, 2000	(United States) Selland Arena, Fresno, California, U.S.	
1	Loss	0–1	(Germany) Elizabeth Rumpf	UD	4	Jul 20, 2000	(United States) Marriott Hotel, Irvine, California, U.S.	

== Bare knuckle boxing record ==
2 fights	1 win	1 loss
By knockout	0	0
By decision	1	1

No.	Result	Record	Opponent	Method	Round, time	Date	Location	Notes
2	Win	1-1	(United States) Sonya Dreiling	UD	5	March 12, 2022	(United States) Florida State Fairgrounds, Tampa, Florida, U.S.	
1	Loss	0-1	(United States) Jozette Cotton	UD	5	Jul 16, 2021	(United States) Seminole Hard Rock Hotel and Casino, Hollywood, Florida, U.S.	

== Accomplishments ==
- Brown Belt in Brazilian Jiu-Jitsu under James Boran
- 2001 ReMix Golden Gate Japan Champion
- W-Fusion 2001 Japan Champion
