= Christian Uflacker =

Brazilian Brazilian Jiu-Jitsu practitioner and mixed martial arts fighter

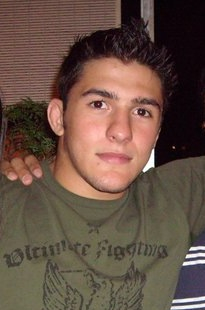
- Born: August 4, 1985 (age 41); Rio de Janeiro, Brazil
- Other names: Xaropinho
- Height: 5 ft 11 in (1.80 m)
- Weight: 155 lb (70 kg; 11.1 st)
- Division: Featherweight; Welterweight (formerly)
- Fighting out of: Chicago, Illinois, United States
- Team: Uflacker Academy
- Rank: 4th degree black belt in Brazilian Jiu-Jitsu under Carlos Gracie Jr; Black belt in Judo
- Years active: 2008–2012 (MMA)

Mixed martial arts record
- Total: 5
- Wins: 5
- By submission: 2
- By decision: 3
- Losses: 0
- Draws: 0

Other information
- Mixed martial arts record from Sherdog

Christian Uflacker (born August 4, 1985) is a Brazilian mixed martial artist and Brazilian Jiu-Jitsu practitioner. He holds a black belt under Carlos Gracie Jr. He is currently the head instructor at Uflacker Academy, in Chicago, Illinois.

== Accomplishments ==
- 1994-First Place in State Champion Tournament (Rio de Janeiro, Brazil)
- 1996-First Place in Brazilian National Champion Tournament, First Place in State Champion Tournament (Rio de Janeiro, Brazil)
- 1997-First Place in State Champion Tournament (Rio de Janeiro, Brazil)
- 1998-Third Place in Brazilian National Champion, First Place in State Champion Tournament (Rio de Janeiro, Brazil)
- 1999-First Place in Brazilian National Champion Tournament, First Place in State Champion (Rio de Janeiro, Brazil)
- 2000-First Place in Brazilian National Champion Tournament, First Place in State Champion Tournament (Rio de Janeiro, Brazil), Third Place in the World Tournament
- 2001-First Place in State Champion Tournament (Rio de Janeiro, Brazil)
- 2002-First Place in World Champion Tournament, First Place in Brazilian National Champion Tournament, First Place in National Teams Champion Tournament
- 2003-First Place in South American Tournament
- 2004-First Place in Challenge Champion Tournament (Brazil vs Argentina)
- 2005-Second place in Brazilian National Teams Tournament
- 2006-First Place in Europe Champion Tournament, NAGA Second place in open weight
- 2007-Third Place in Pan American Tournament
- 2007-First Place in USJJF American National Championships

== Mixed martial arts record ==
Professional record breakdown
5 matches	5 wins	0 losses
By submission	2	0
By decision	3	0

Res.	Record	Opponent	Method	Event	Date	Round	Time	Location	Notes
Win	5–0	Cliff Wright	Technical Decision (unanimous)	Bellator 84	December 14, 2012	3	2:26	Hammond, Indiana, United States	
Win	4–0	LC Davis	Decision (split)	Hoosier Fight Club 10	February 11, 2012	3	5:00	Valparaiso, IN, United States	Featherweight debut.
Win	3–0	Jonatas Novaes	Decision (unanimous)	Strikeforce: Fedor vs. Rogers	November 7, 2009	3	5:00	Hoffman Estates, Illinois, United States	
Win	2–0	Mark Sinclair	Submission (rear-naked choke)	Total Fight Challenge 13	September 20, 2008	1	1:22	Hammond, Indiana, United States	
Win	1–0	Kori Trussell	Submission (rear-naked choke)	Total Fight Challenge 12	June 28, 2008	1	2:20	Hammond, Indiana, United States	
