= Louis Taylor =

American mixed martial artist

- Born: Louis Taylor; May 12, 1979 (age 47); Chicago, Illinois, U.S.
- Other names: Put The Guns Down; Handgunz (formerly)
- Height: 5 ft 11 in (1.80 m)
- Weight: 186 lb (84 kg; 13.3 st)
- Division: Light Heavyweight; Middleweight; Welterweight
- Reach: 74 in (190 cm)
- Stance: Orthodox
- Fighting out of: Chicago, Illinois, United States NCAA Division I Wrestling
- Team: Chicago Fight Team
- Rank: Purple belt in Brazilian Jiu-Jitsu under Rudy Jimenez
- Years active: 2007–2014, 2016–2018

Mixed martial arts record
- Total: 23
- Wins: 18
- By knockout: 8
- By submission: 6
- By decision: 4
- Losses: 4
- By knockout: 3
- By submission: 1
- Draws: 1

Other information
- Mixed martial arts record from Sherdog

Louis Taylor (born May 12, 1979) is an American former mixed martial artist who most recently competed in the welterweight division of the Professional Fighters League. A professional competitor from 2007 to 2018, Taylor also formerly competed for Strikeforce and Bellator. He was the first PFL Middleweight Tournament champion.

== Background ==
Born and raised in the heart of Chicago's South Side, Taylor learned to defend himself from a young age. After being arrested at around age 16 for fighting a group of four gang members attacking him, in which he broke an assailant's collarbone, Taylor was introduced to a high school wrestling coach and former Olympic alternate Ken Binge, by his pastor. Taylor, a sophomore at the time, later moved in with an uncle so that he could attend the school and compete. Highly talented, Taylor was a two-time state qualifier, and became the first competitor from his school to place at the state tournament. He later went on to wrestle for Lassen Community College in Susanville, California, where he was roommates with UFC light heavyweight champion Rampage Jackson. At-then junior college powerhouse Lassen, Taylor was introduced to MMA and wrestled for two seasons before transferring to Eastern Illinois University. Competing at 174 lbs. under legendary former UFC champion and EIU coach Matt Hughes, Taylor excelled. Later, Taylor returned to Chicago to coach his former high school team, before transitioning to MMA at the age of 28. He was the high school wrestling coach of UFC welterweight champion Belal Muhammad and was later instrumental in training Muhammad for the latter's amateur career.

== Mixed martial arts career ==
=== Early career ===
Taylor had three amateur fights before making his professional debut in 2007 as a Light Heavyweight. Taylor compiled a record of 4–0 before debuting for Strikeforce.

=== The Ultimate Fighter ===
Taylor was at the tryouts for The Ultimate Fighter 13 on November 4, 2010. He did not make the final cast to get onto the show which debuted on March 30, 2011.

=== Strikeforce ===
Taylor made his Strikeforce debut at Strikeforce: Fedor vs. Rogers on November 7, 2009, against Nate Moore and was defeated via submission due to punches in the second round.

He would make his next appearance for the promotion in the main event of Strikeforce Challengers: Riggs vs. Taylor on August 13, 2010, against former WEC Welterweight Champion Joe Riggs and was defeated via submission due to punches in the third round.

=== Combat USA ===
Taylor fought Jason Louck on May 14, 2011, to determine the Middleweight Combat USA State Champion of Illinois. Taylor won the fight by submission (strikes) and was then supposed to face the Middleweight Combat USA State Champion of Wisconsin, Herbert Goodman. Unfortunately, Taylor Combat USA would not release Taylor from his contract.

=== Bellator Fighting Championships ===
Taylor first fought for Bellator at Bellator 14 on April 15, 2010, and won by KO due to a head kick in the first round over Ryan Sturdy.

Taylor fought for the promotion again on December 14, 2012, at Bellator 84 against UFC veteran Joe Vedepo. Taylor defeated Vedepo via first-round knockout.

=== Ultimate Fighting Championship ===
After an injury forced Costas Philippou out of his bout with Uriah Hall, it was announced on January 2, 2015, that Taylor had signed on to face Hall on short notice at UFC Fight Night: McGregor vs. Siver on January 18, 2015. However, on January 11, it was announced that Taylor pulled out of the fight due to a pulled muscle in his back and had his contract terminated as result.

=== World Series of Fighting ===
On March 12, 2016, Taylor made his World Series of Fighting debut at WSOF 29 against Cory Devela. He won via guillotine choke submission in 29 seconds of the first round.

On July 30, 2016, Taylor faced undefeated fighter Phil Hawes at WSOF 32. He won via guillotine choke submission in the second round.

=== Professional Fighters League ===
Taylor faced Anderson Goncalves at PFL 3 in Washington, D.C., on July 5, 2018. He won the fight via TKO in the third round.

In the fall of 2018, Taylor entered the PFL Middleweight tournament. At PFL 10 on October 20, 2018, he defeated Rex Harris by unanimous decision in the quarterfinal round. He then fought John Howard to a technical draw in the semifinal round; Taylor advanced to the finals by having won the first round. Taylor faced Abusupiyan Magomedov in the finals at PFL 11 on December 31, 2018. He won the fight via knockout just 33 seconds into the first round, winning the PFL Middleweight Championship and earning the $1 million cash prize.

For the second season of PFL, Taylor was expected to drop down to welterweight and face Chris Curtis on May 9, 2019. However just a week before the second season's start, Taylor announced that he had withdrawn from the tournament.

== Personal life ==
Taylor is married and has children.

== Championships and accomplishments ==
- World Series of Fighting
  - Fastest Submission in WSOF History (0:29) vs. Cory Devela
- Professional Fighters League
  - 2018 Middleweight Tournament champion

== Mixed martial arts record ==
Professional record breakdown
23 matches	18 wins	4 losses
By knockout	8	3
By submission	6	1
By decision	4	0
Draws	1	

Res.	Record	Opponent	Method	Event	Date	Round	Time	Location	Notes
Win	18–4–1	Abusupiyan Magomedov	KO (punch)	PFL 11 (2018)	December 31, 2018	1	0:33	New York City, New York, United States	Won the 2018 PFL Middleweight Tournament.
Draw	17–4–1	John Howard	Technical Draw (unanimous)	PFL 10 (2018)	October 20, 2018	2	4:55	Washington, D.C., United States	2018 PFL Middleweight Tournament Semifinal. Accidental illegal knee rendered Howard unable to continue. Advanced via first round tiebreaker.
Win	17–4	Rex Harris	Decision (unanimous)	PFL 10 (2018)	October 20, 2018	2	5:00	Washington, D.C., United States	2018 PFL Middleweight Tournament Quarterfinal.
Win	16–4	Andre Lobato	Decision (unanimous)	PFL 6 (2018)	August 16, 2018	3	5:00	Atlantic City, New Jersey, United States	
Win	15–4	Anderson Gonçalves	TKO (punches)	PFL 3 (2018)	July 5, 2018	3	0:58	Washington, D.C., United States	
Win	14–4	Zach Conn	Decision (unanimous)	PFL Everett	July 29, 2017	3	5:00	Everett, Washington, United States	
Loss	13–4	David Branch	Submission (rear-naked choke)	WSOF 34	December 31, 2016	5	2:00	New York City, New York, United States	For the WSOF Middleweight Championship.
Win	13–3	Phil Hawes	Submission (guillotine choke)	WSOF 32	July 30, 2016	2	2:15	Everett, Washington, United States	
Win	12–3	Cory Devela	Technical Submission (guillotine choke)	WSOF 29	March 12, 2016	1	0:29	Greeley, Colorado, United States	
Win	11–3	Brian Houston	Submission (guillotine choke)	American Predator FC 17	October 11, 2014	1	2:14	Hoffman Estates, Illinois, United States	Return to Middleweight.
Win	10–3	Robert Gotreau	Submission (guillotine choke)	American Predator FC 16	April 5, 2014	1	2:06	Villa Park, Illinois, United States	Welterweight debut.
Win	9–3	Eric Hammerich	Submission (guillotine choke)	American Predator FC 11	June 22, 2013	1	3:54	McCook, Illinois, United States	
Win	8–3	Joe Vedepo	KO (punch)	Bellator 84	December 14, 2012	1	4:12	Hammond, Indiana, United States	
Loss	7–3	Perry Filkins	TKO (punches)	Combat Zone 40	January 27, 2012	1	4:02	Salem, New Hampshire, United States	
Win	7–2	Jason Louck	TKO (submission to strikes)	Combat USA: Illinois State Finals	May 14, 2011	2	4:40	Racine, Wisconsin, United States	
Loss	6–2	Joe Riggs	TKO (submission to strikes)	Strikeforce Challengers: Riggs vs. Taylor	August 13, 2010	3	2:07	Phoenix, Arizona, United States	Catchweight (182 lbs) bout.
Win	6–1	Ryan Sturdy	KO (head kick)	Bellator 14	April 15, 2010	1	1:08	Chicago, Illinois, United States	
Win	5–1	Curtis Bailey	TKO (punches)	Hoosier FC 2	January 2, 2010	1	0:33	Hammond, Indiana, United States	
Loss	4–1	Nate Moore	TKO (submission to punches)	Strikeforce: Fedor vs. Rogers	November 7, 2009	2	3:24	Hoffman Estates, Illinois, United States	Middleweight debut.
Win	4–0	Steve Paterson	KO (punches)	Total Fight Challenge 14	February 21, 2009	1	4:34	Hammond, Indiana, United States	
Win	3–0	Adam Maciejewski	Decision (unanimous)	Adrenaline MMA: Guida vs. Russow	June 14, 2008	3	5:00	Chicago, Illinois, United States	
Win	2–0	Aaron Kreke	TKO (slam)	Corral Combat Classic 2	April 26, 2008	2	0:40	Hammond, Indiana, United States	
Win	1–0	Ricco Talamantes	Submission (guillotine choke)	International Sport Combat Federation: Fight 2 the Finish	November 9, 2007	1	4:30	Chicago, Illinois, United States	Light Heavyweight debut.

== See also ==
- List of current PFL fighters
