= Takayo Hashi =

Japanese mixed martial artist

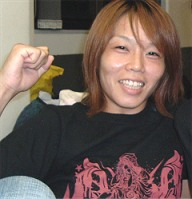
- Born: October 2, 1977 (age 49); Sumida-ku, Tokyo, Japan
- Nationality: Japanese
- Height: 5 ft 3.75 in (1.62 m)
- Weight: 124 lb (56 kg; 8.9 st)
- Style: Grappling
- Fighting out of: Honbu, Tokyo, Japan
- Team: Wajyutsu Keisyukai Brightness

Mixed martial arts record
- Total: 30
- Wins: 19
- By knockout: 1
- By submission: 5
- By decision: 13
- Losses: 10
- By knockout: 1
- By submission: 1
- By decision: 8
- Draws: 1

Other information
- Mixed martial arts record from Sherdog

Takayo Hashi (端貴代 Hashi Takayo, born October 2, 1977) is a Japanese female mixed martial artist.

== Biography ==
Hashi observed her brother grappling and competing in mixed martial arts and this inspired her to compete as well.

She joined the Wajutsu Keishukai, Tokyo Honbu gym and worked as an office worker during the day.

== Mixed martial arts career ==
Hashi held the title of Smackgirl Grappling Queen in the promotion's Open-Weight division.

She competed in the Japanese Abu Dhabi (ADCC) qualifiers in 2007 and won her division. On May 6 and 7 of that year, she took third place in the official ADCC Submission Wrestling World Championship in Trenton, New Jersey.

Hashi suffered her first defeat in MMA in 2005 when she was submitted by Hitomi Akano. She then won eight straight fights and avenged the loss to Akano in their 2007 rematch.

Hashi faced Amanda Buckner at FFF 4 - Call of the Wild on April 3, 2008. She won the fight by unanimous decision. She later defeated Chisa Yonezawa at Valkyrie 2 on April 25, 2009.

Hashi was set to make her Strikeforce debut against Sarah Kaufman at Strikeforce Challengers: Kaufman vs. Hashi on November 20, 2009, but the fight was later removed from the card. It was first rescheduled for January 2010, but finally took place on February 26, 2010. The fight crowned the first Strikeforce Women's Bantamweight Champion at 135 lbs. However, Hashi lost the fight by Unanimous Decision after five rounds.

Hashi faced Tara LaRosa at DaMMAge Fight League 1 on November 24, 2010, in Atlantic City, New Jersey. She was defeated by Unanimous Decision after five rounds.

Hashi challenged Cat Zingano in a women's title bout at Fight To Win: Outlaws on May 14, 2011, in Denver, Colorado. She was defeated by knockout from a slam late in the third round.

On February 10, 2012, it was announced that Hashi would face Roxanne Modafferi at Jewels 18th Ring on March 3 in Tokyo. She defeated Modafferi by unanimous decision.

=== Pancrase ===
In 2018, Hashi signed with Pancrase and after her promotional debut victory she challenged Sidy Rocha for the inaugural Pancrase Flyweight Championship but lost the fight via unanimous decision.

She then faced Mayra Cantuária at Pancrase 308 on September 29, 2019. She lost the fight via unanimous decision.

Hashi faced Raika Emiko at Pancrase 316 on July 24, 2020. She won the fight via unanimous decision.

She faced Nori Date for the interim Flyweight Queen of Pancrase title at Pancrase 324 on October 17, 2021. She won the bout and the title via unanimous decision.

Hashi rematched Nori Date on April 30, 2023, at Pancrase 333, once again defending her title by winning the bout via unanimous decision.

== Mixed martial arts record ==
Professional record breakdown
30 matches	19 wins	10 losses
By knockout	1	1
By submission	5	1
By decision	13	8
Draws	1	

Res.	Record	Opponent	Method	Event	Date	Round	Time	Location	Notes
Loss	19–10–1	Fumika Watanabe	Decision (unanimous)	Pancrase 347	September 29, 2024	3	5:00	Tokyo, Japan	
Loss	19–9–1	Honoka Shigeta	Decision (unanimous)	Pancrase 341	March 31, 2024	5	5:00	Tokyo, Japan	Lost the Pancrase Women's Flyweight Championship.
Win	19–8–1	Nori Date	Decision (unanimous)	Pancrase 333	April 30, 2023	5	5:00	Tachikawa, Japan	Defended the Pancrase Women's Flyweight Championship.
Win	18–8–1	Nori Date	Decision (unanimous)	Pancrase 324	October 17, 2021	5	5:00	Tokyo, Japan	Won the interim Pancrase Women's Flyweight Championship. Later promoted to undisputed champion.
Win	17–8–1	Raika Emiko	Decision (unanimous)	Pancrase 316	July 24, 2020	3	5:00	Tokyo, Japan	
Loss	16–8–1	Mayra Cantuária	Decision (unanimous)	Pancrase 308	September 29, 2019	3	5:00	Tokyo, Japan	
Loss	16–7–1	Sidy Rocha	Decision (unanimous)	Pancrase 304	April 14, 2019	5	5:00	Tokyo, Japan	For the inaugural Pancrase Women's Flyweight Championship.
Win	16–6–1	Barbara Acioly	Submission (rear-naked choke)	Pancrase 293	February 4, 2018	2	3:20	Tokyo, Japan	
Loss	15–6–1	Ji Yeon Kim	Decision (unanimous)	Deep Jewels 9	August 29, 2015	3	5:00	Tokyo, Japan	Lost the Deep Jewels Bantamweight Championship.
Loss	15–5–1	Barb Honchak	Decision (unanimous)	Invicta FC 9: Honchak vs. Hashi	November 1, 2014	5	5:00	Davenport, Iowa	For the Invicta FC Flyweight Championship.
Win	15–4–1	Shizuka Sugiyama	TKO (punches)	Deep Jewels 4	May 18, 2014	3	4:20	Tokyo, Japan	Won the Deep Jewels inaugural Middleweight (135 lbs) Championship
Draw	14–4–1	Ji Yeon Kim	Draw (unanimous)	Road FC Korea 002: Korea vs. Japan	March 9, 2014	2	5:00	Seoul, South Korea	
Win	14–4	Roxanne Modafferi	Decision (unanimous)	Jewels 18th Ring	March 3, 2012	2	5:00	Koto, Tokyo, Japan	
Loss	13–4	Cat Zingano	KO (slam)	Fight To Win: "Outlaws"	May 14, 2011	3	4:42	Denver, Colorado, United States	For Fight To Win Women's Championship
Loss	13–3	Tara LaRosa	Decision (unanimous)	DaMMAge Fight League - The Big Bang	November 24, 2010	5	5:00	Atlantic City, New Jersey, United States	For DaMMAge Fight League Women's 125 lbs Championship
Loss	13–2	Sarah Kaufman	Decision (unanimous)	Strikeforce Challengers: Kaufman vs. Hashi	February 26, 2010	5	5:00	San Jose, California, United States	For the Strikeforce Women's Bantamweight Championship.
Win	13–1	Chisa Yonezawa	Submission (rear-naked choke)	GCM - Valkyrie 2	April 25, 2009	2	1:43	Tokyo, Japan	
Win	12–1	Amanda Buckner	Decision (unanimous)	FFF 4: "Call of the Wild"	April 3, 2008	3	5:00	Los Angeles, California, United States	
Win	11–1	Hitomi Akano	Decision (unanimous)	Smackgirl - Queens' Hottest Summer	September 6, 2007	3	5:00	Tokyo, Japan	Won the Smackgirl Middleweight Championship.
Win	10–1	Hee Jin Lee	Decision (unanimous)	Deep: CMA Festival 2	July 23, 2007	2	5:00	Tokyo, Japan	
Win	9–1	Sybil Starr	Submission (armbar)	Smackgirl - Will The Queen Paint The Shinjuku Skies Red?	March 11, 2007	1	2:47	Tokyo, Japan	
Win	8–1	Miki Morifuji	Decision (unanimous)	Smackgirl - Legend of Extreme Women	November 29, 2006	2	5:00	Tokyo, Japan	
Win	7–1	Kinuka Sasaki	Submission (rear-naked choke)	Smackgirl - Top Girl Battle	June 30, 2006	1	2:31	Tokyo, Japan	
Win	6–1	Kazuma Morohoshi	Decision (unanimous)	Smackgirl - Advent of Goddess	February 15, 2006	2	5:00	Tokyo, Japan	
Loss	5–1	Hitomi Akano	Submission (armbar)	Smackgirl - Dynamic!!	August 17, 2005	1	1:19	Tokyo, Japan	
Win	5–0	Yukari	Decision (unanimous)	Smackgirl - The Next Cinderella 2005 Second Stage	July 10, 2005	2	5:00	Tokyo, Japan	
Win	4–0	Yoko Hattori	Decision (unanimous)	Smackgirl - The Next Cinderella 2005 First Stage	April 29, 2005	2	5:00	Tokyo, Japan	
Win	3–0	Yumiko Sugimoto	Decision (unanimous)	GCM - Cross Section 3	December 12, 2004	2	5:00	Tokyo, Japan	
Win	2–0	Mika Harigai	Submission (rear-naked choke)	Smackgirl - Yuuki Kondo Retirement Celebration	November 4, 2004	2	4:28	Tokyo, Japan	
Win	1–0	Natsuko Kikukawa	Decision (unanimous)	GCM - Cross Section 2	September 4, 2004	2	5:00	Tokyo, Japan	

== Championships ==
- Deep Jewels Bantamweight Champion (one time)
- Final Smackgirl Middleweight Champion

== See also ==
- List of current mixed martial arts champions
- List of female mixed martial artists
