= Megumi Yabushita =

Japanese mixed martial artist, judoka and professional wrestler

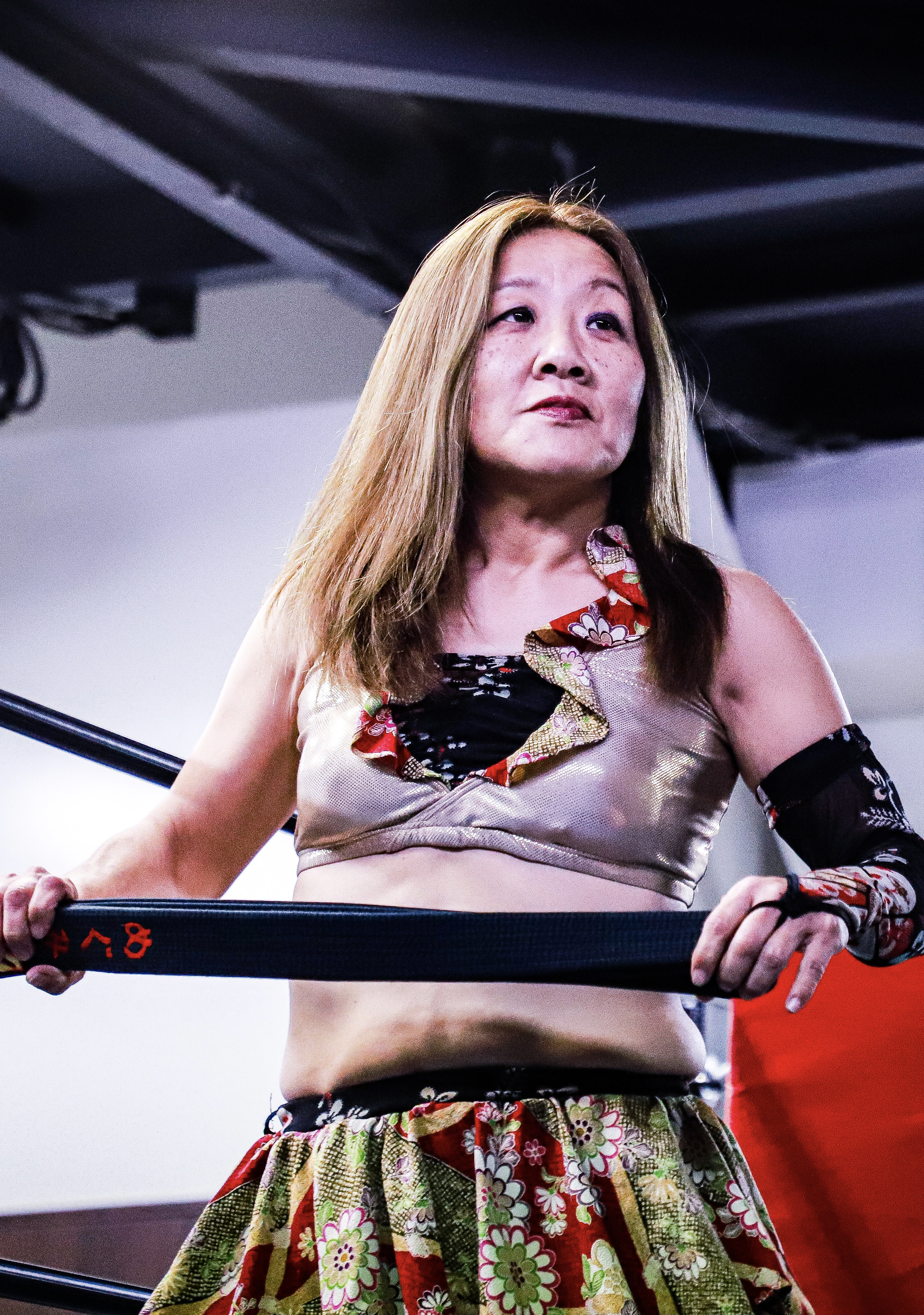
- Yabushita in April 2023
- Born: March 2, 1972 (age 54); Asahikawa, Hokkaido, Japan
- Other names: Grappling Goddess; Ice Queen
- Nationality: Japanese
- Height: 1.58 m (5 ft 2 in)
- Weight: 61 kg (134 lb)
- Style: Kickboxing, Shoot boxing, Muay Thai, Shoot wrestling, Wrestling, Judo
- Fighting out of: Asahikawa, Hokkaido, Japan
- Team: Jd'→SOD Joshi Kakutogi Dojo→Tomoegumi→Freelance→Fight Chix
- Years active: 1997-2016 (MMA); 2003-2017 (kickboxing)

Kickboxing record
- Total: 13
- Wins: 1
- Losses: 10
- By knockout: 4
- Draws: 1
- No contests: 1

Mixed martial arts record
- Total: 42
- Wins: 19
- By knockout: 1
- By submission: 10
- By decision: 7
- By disqualification: 1
- Losses: 23
- By knockout: 4
- By submission: 6
- By decision: 13

Other information
- Website: Official blog
- Mixed martial arts record from Sherdog
- Last updated on: February 2, 2017

Megumi Yabushita (藪下 めぐみ, Yabushita Megumi; born on March 2, 1972) is a retired Japanese female mixed martial artist, kickboxer, professional wrestler and judoka. She has participated in several Japanese professional wrestling and mixed martial arts promotions. She is a Japanese national judo champion and a former Smackgirl open weight champion and tournament winner.

== Background ==
Yabushita was born on March 2, 1972 in Asahikawa, Hokkaido, Japan. Her father introduced her into judo, training her before entering elementary school. Yabushita excelled at judo starting in high school and became a regular participant in national championships.

== Judo career ==
Yabushita graduated from Asahikawa University High School, where she won the judo club competitions in the less than 48 kg division in 1988 and 1989. Scouted by Japan's corporate judo team Miki House, she won the all-Japan individual championships in 1993, in 1994 she placed third in the Fukuoka international women's judo championships in the 52 kg class and in 1995 she placed fifth in the World Masters Munich in the 52 kg class. and also participated in the 52 kg class in the 1995 World Judo Championships celebrated in Chiba, Japan.

== Professional wrestling career ==
In 1996, Yabushita joined Jd' wrestling promotion, She made her debut on April 20, 1997 in a match against Sumie Sakai at Korakuen Hall. On September 7, 1997, Yabushita won the Jd' Junior title in Tokyo by winning a round-robin tournament where she defeated Sakai in the final match and she would lose it on her first defense against The Bloody on October 22, 1997. She would regain the title on January 24, 1999 by defeating Sakai once again and this time went on to successfully defend it three times before vacating it.

On October 9, 1999, Yabushita and Sakai became the Trans-world Wrestling Federation World Women's Tag Team champions. and defended it one time before losing it on March 7, 2000 against Crusher Maedomari and Drake Morimatsu. Megumi Yabushita and Sumie Sakai would regain the title one more time, by pinning Kazuki on February 10, 2002 and Sachie Abe on February 7, 2002 in a couple of special stipulation matches. Yabushita left Jd' gym in 2002. She would win the Tag team title one more time with Maru as her partner on June 22, 2003 by winning the final of an 8-team tournament against The Bloody and Yumi Ohka, who would in turn gain the title in Yabushita's and Maru's first defense on August 10, 2003.

Yabushita also won the American Wrestling Federation World Women's Title on August 22, 1999 and on November 28, 2000. On November 26, 2000, Yabushita defeated The Bloody to win the BS Japan Queen of the Ring Title, and with his victory of the AWF title, she unifies both titles that then became the Jd' Double Title.

Yabushita along with Command Bolshoi became the Daily Sports Women's Tag Team and JWP Tag Team Champions on April 12, 2009.

== Mixed martial arts career ==
When she joined women's wrestling promotion Jd' in 1996, she met Yoko Takahashi, "Japan's First Woman MMA Fighter." At the time, Takahashi, injured with a hernia that made her retire from pro-wrestling and focus on MMA, was working as pro-wrestling referee and also trained in MMA, which was the reason why Yabushita started training in MMA. On December 8, 1997, Yabushita made her MMA debut against South Korea Ji Hee Yu, defeating her with an armbar submission at 2:51 of the first round at Central Martial Arts Association event Octagon Challenge, held at the Nagoya Congress Center Century Hall in Nagoya, Aichi, Japan.

Her next bouts and her rose to prominence would take place during Smackgirl's ReMix World Cup 2000 celebrated on December 5, 2000 at the Nippon Budokan in Tokyo, Japan. The tournament held a ¥10,000,000 for the winner, ¥1,000,000 for the runner-up and ¥500,000 for both third places. Yabushita's first match in the tournament was against American kickboxer Bambi Bertoncello, whom Yabushita defeated with an armbar submission. Her spotlight in the tournament was in her match against Russian judoka Svetlana Goundarenko, who had submitted American Erin Toughill, outweighed Yabushita for over 200 lb (91 kg) and had a height advantage of 33 cm (1.08 ft). Despite these disadvantages, Yabushita was able to control the fight with her quickness and takedown skills, earning a unanimous decision victory and a spot in the final. In the final, Dutch fighter Marloes Coenen defeated Yabushita by unanimous decision. With her performance in the tournament, Yabushita and women's MMA became one of the hottest topics in Japanese fight sports.

Yabushita lost her next bout by technical submission (armbar) against Erin Toughill on May 3, 2001 in the ReMix's event Golden Gate 2001. Yabushita's next match was on January 13, 2002 in Jd' wrestling promotion event No holds barred 2002 in a MMA rules bout where she was once again defeated by Marloes Coenen, this time by a rear naked choke submission. Yabushita would lose for the third time in a row against Japanese Asako Saioka who, contrary to Yabushita's previous opponents, matched her in height and weight and defeated Yabushita by unanimous decision on June 1, 2002 in ReMix promotion successor, Smackgirl, in the event Smack Legend 2002 at the Differ Ariake Arena.

On June 4, 2003, Yabushita got another victory by submitting Japanese kickboxer Naoko Sakamoto with an armbar at 0:23 of round one in Smackgirl Third Season-IV. At All Japan Women's Pro-Wrestling event Tag League: The Best, Yabushita defeated fellow pro-wrestler Shioya Yoshimi by armbar submission in a MMA bout on December 19, 2003.

Yabushita made her debut in Shooto promotion on November 26, 2004 in the event G-Shooto Japan: Activation, defeating Hitomi Akano in Akano's professional debut and in a match in which Yabushita applied a giant swing on Akano.

On December 19, 2004, Yabushita participated in Smackgirl's World ReMix 2004 held on Shizuoka, Shizuoka Prefecture, Japan, in the open weight queen decision tournament, which would crown the first Smackgirl open weight champion. Josh Barnett's student, American fighter Shannon Hooper, was Yabushita's first opponent whom Yabushita defeated at 0:29 of round one with a wristlock. Yabushita next faced American grappler Roxanne Modafferi in the semi-finals, defeating Modafferi by unanimous decision. In a rematch of their 2001 bout, Yamaguchi and Erin Toughill fought in the tournament final. Toughill, who had just defeated Marloes Coenen by TKO, outweighed Yabushita for around 20 kg (44 lb) and was controlling the fight until Yabushita grabbed Toughill's left wrist in an effort to stop her attacks, to which Toughill responded with two elbows to the spinal cord, an illegal action. The referee immediately stopped the fight and gave Toughill a yellow card while Yabushita was writhing in pain. The ring doctor didn't allow the bout to continue after checking Yabushita, which resulted in an immediate disqualification for Toughill and this gave the open weight title to Yabushita. As a precautionary measure, Yabushita was carried to the waiting room in a stretcher and was taken to a hospital in which she was diagnosed with lumbar transverse processes fracture, according to the event organizers, and rendered Yabushita unable to fulfill her commitment to fight against Brazilian Jiu-Jitsu specialist Felicia Oh in a grappling match on January 8, 2005.

Yabushita's next fight was in the event G-Shooto Japan 02, where American fighter Tara LaRosa defeated Yabushita by majority decision on March 12, 2005.

On April 30, 2005, Yabushita fought against South Korean kickboxer Hyun Sung Kim as part of the opening round of Smackgirl's first middleweight queen decision tournament in Smackgirl 2005: Cool Fighter's Last Stand. In an unexpected development, as Kim advanced to attack, Yabushita used a judo throw on Kim which slammed Kim's face directly on the mat, knocking her out instantly, while Yabushita tried an arm submission, unaware of Kim's state. The referee rushed to stop the fight and Yabushita won at 0:29 of round one, with Yabushita not knowing what transpired until asking her corner. There was concern over Kim's health, as she had to be carried outside the ring on a stretcher but after being examined at the hospital there were no abnormalities found on Kim.

Yabushita fought in World X-Impact Federation's X-Impact World Championships, an event held in Seoul, South Korea on July 9, 2005, where she defeated local fighter Yong Joo Lee by unanimous decision.

On August 17, 2005, Yabushita returned to Smackgirl for the final part of the middleweight queen decision tournament that took place in the event Smackgirl 2005: Dynamic!! in Shibuya, Tokyo, Japan. In the semi-finals, Yabushita defeated Asako Saioka by armbar, avenging her 2002 loss against Saioka. Yabushita was defeated in a 1-2 decision in the tournament final by American fighter Laura D'Auguste, who became the first Smackgirl middleweight champion.

After the tournament, Yabushita lost against American Amanda Buckner by submission (guillotine choke) in Smackgirl 2006: Advent of Goddess on February 15, 2006. Yabushita had an exhibition match against Mika Nagano on May 3, 2006. A few days after, Yabushita would have another defeat on May 6, 2006 in G-Shooto Japan 05 at the hands of Roxanne Modafferi by unanimous decision, in a rematch of their 2004 fight.

On August 18, 2006, Yabushita and Laura D'Auguste had a rematch in which D'Auguste was defending her Ring of Combat women's welterweight title in Ring of Combat 11 held in Atlantic City, New Jersey, United States. Yabushita's corner was forced to stop the fight after Yabushita got her forearm fractured during the first round.

Yabushita rebounded back with a majority decision victory against Japanese Mizuho Sato in Shooto's Battle Mix Tokyo 02 on March 30, 2007. On April 28, 2007, Yabushita defeated Mayumi Aoki by unanimous decision in Smackgirl 2007: The Dance of the Taisho Romance.

Yabushita participated in the event K-Grace on May 27, 2007 in the US$10,000 contest open weight tournament. Her first bout was against Lithuanian kickboxer Jurgita Leitonaite, whom Yabushita defeated in 17 seconds with an armbar. For the third time, Yabushita clashed with Roxanne Modafferi, with Modafferi gaining a unanimous decision and advancing to the final which she eventually won.

Returning to the US, Yabushita participated in Fatal Femmes Fighting Championship 2: The Crystal Brawl, where she faced another Josh Barnett's student, American Ginele Marquez, who defeated Yabushita by unanimous decision on July 14, 2007.

In the open-air event Smackgirl in Summerfest!! on July 26, 2007, Yabushita submitted Hiroko Kohata with an armbar in 15 seconds. On November 3, 2007, Yabushita was defeated by American fighter Lisa Ellis with a unanimous decision in the event Fatal Femmes Fighting Championship 3: War of the Roses. Facing another American fighter on December 26, 2007 in Smackgirl 7th anniversary: Starting Over, Yabushita was once again defeated by unanimous decision, this time against Lana Stefanac, who had an 80 lb (36 kg) advantage over Yabushita.

During the open weight tournament in Smackgirl world ReMix tournament 2008 Opening Round held on February 14, 2008, Yabushita had a rematch against Hitomi Akano, whom Yabushita defeated in Akano's debut in MMA in 2007, and in this occasion it ended with Akano submitting Yabushita with a heel hook.

Yabushita had her four straight loss at the hands of Russian fighter Julia Berezikova, who won the match by unanimous decision in the event FightFORCE: Russia vs. The World held in Saint Petersburg, Russia, on April 19, 2008.

Rebounding back from her losing streak, Yabushita scored a unanimous decision victory over Emi Fujino at Japanese event Demolition 080721 on July 21, 2008.

After a year without fighting in MMA, on August 28, 2009, it was announced that Yabushita would be making her debut with Jewels promotion in the event Jewels 5th Ring facing fellow pro-wrestler Atsuko Emoto. On September 13, 2009, Yabushita defeated Emoto by submission (armbar) at 2:43 mins. of round one after resisting Emoto's initial attack.

Yabushita returned to the United States on January 30, 2010 to participate in Freestyle Cage Fighting women's bantamweight grand prix at Freestyle Cage Fighting 39. For the third time, Yabushita was facing another Josh Barnett's student, this time submission specialist Shayna Baszler, who dominated the fight and submitted Yabushita with a twister, a catch wrestling move rarely seen in MMA.

On April 11, 2010, Yabushita made her debut with Valkyrie promotion, defeating Japanese fighter Mutsumi Kasai with a scarf hold armlock submission, handling Kasai her first professional loss, in the event Valkyrie 05.

Yabushita next faced Japanese MMA rising star Rin Nakai at Valkyrie 06 on June 19, 2010, losing by unanimous decision in a match that Nakai dominated to remain undefeated.

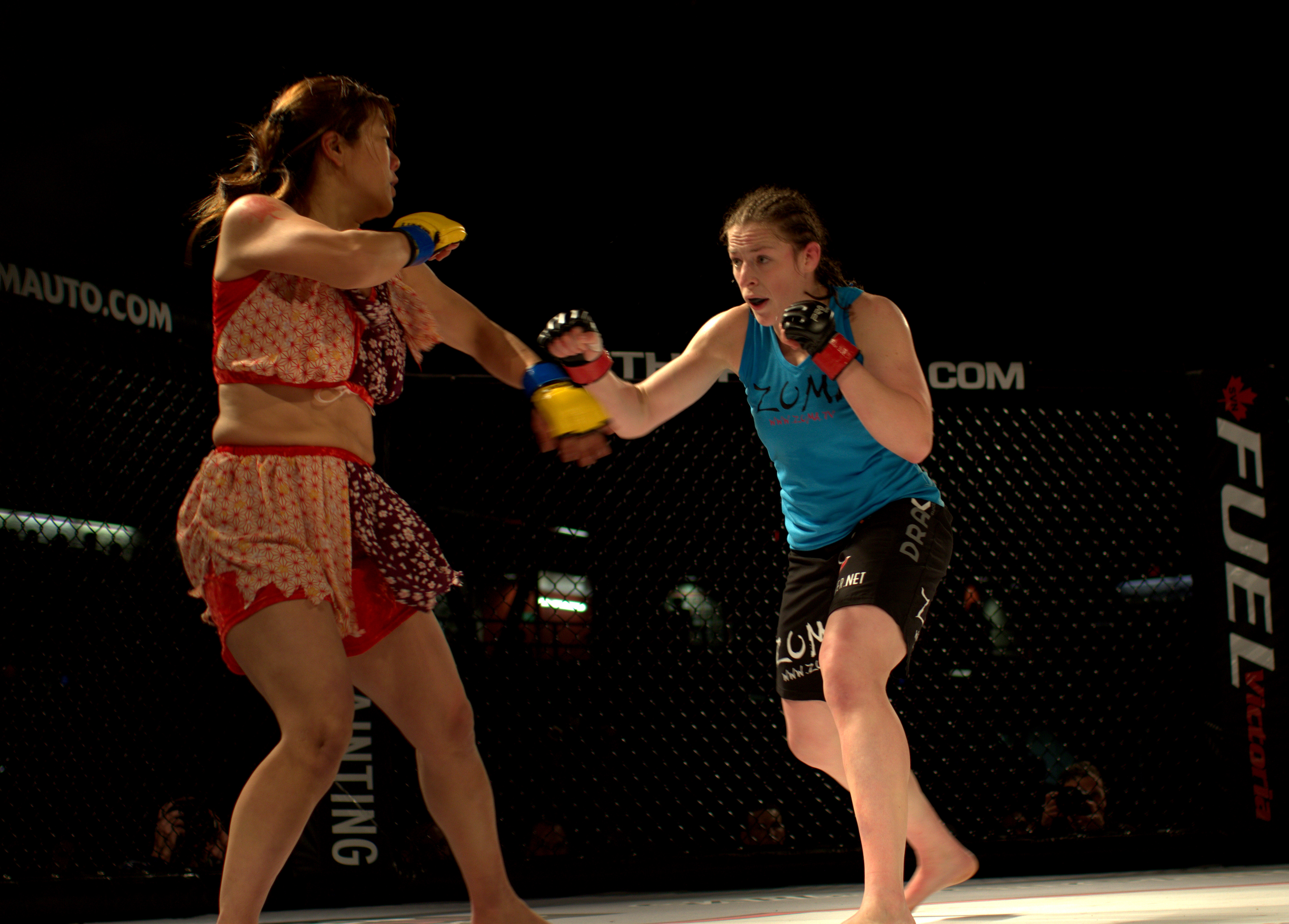
Yabushita facing Sarah Kaufman

Yabushita faced Sarah Kaufman at Armageddon Fighting Championship 5: Judgment Day on April 2, 2011 in Victoria, British Columbia, Canada. She was defeated by TKO in the third round.

Yabushita faced professional wrestler Kyoko Kimura at Pancrase Impressive Tour 11 on November 12, 2011. She was defeated by TKO (doctor stoppage) due to an ankle injury sustained in the first round.

Yabushita returned to Jewels to face Shizuka Sugiyama at Jewels 20th Ring on July 21, 2012. She was defeated by split decision.

On December 15, 2012, Yabushita faced Jade Marie Anderson at Jewels 22nd Ring. She was defeated by unanimous decision.

Yabushita faced Anderson again in a rematch at Gladiator: Dream, Power and Hope on April 21, 2013. She was defeated by technical submission due to an armbar in the first round.

== Submission grappling career ==
Yabushita was supposed to debut at submission grappling against Felicia Oh on January 8, 2005, but Erin Toughill injured Yabushita in their December 19, 2004 MMA bout and Yabushita was unable to grapple against Oh. Yabushita competed in the first women's divisions at the ADCC World Championships on May 27 and 28, 2005. She lost to eventual champion Juliana Borges in the semi-final of the over 60 kg division and to Tara LaRosa in the opening round of the absolute division. Yabushita participated in Smackgirl Grappling Queen Tournament 2007 on September 24, 2007, defeating against Hitomi Sakamoto by decision (25-0) and losing against Akiko Ninomiya with a choke sleeper submission in the middleweight tournament final.

== Kickboxing and Shoot boxing career ==
On January 26, 2003, Yabushita debuted in kickboxing, losing against Yuko Okamoto by TKO, after Yabushita had her left shoulder dislocated in All-Japan Kickboxing Federation event Girls standing fight 1st. bout - Girls Shock!. Her next match was a draw against Hikaru Shinohara in the event Nyotei Produce: Belief in a kickboxing rules match with no judges on June 12, 2005.

On April 4, 2006, it was announced that Yabushita would have a kickboxing rematch against South Korean Hyun Sung Kim whom Yabushita had brutally knocked out with a slam on Kim's face in a MMA match on April 30, 2005. This time, Kim controlled the match and defeated Yabushita by decision (0-3) on May 24, 2006 in the Central Martial Arts Association event CMA festival: Japan vs. South Korea total war.

Facing another South Korean, Yabushita was defeated by Seo Hee Ham by unanimous decision in the event CMA Festival 2: Ikuhisa Minowa debut 10 anniversary tournament celebrated on July 23, 2007.

Yabushita was defeated by Japanese Muay Thai expert Rie Murakami with a unanimous decision on August 5, 2007 in the event Breathless Muay Thai 4. Yabushita had another unanimous decision loss at the hands of Mitsuki, whom Yabushita faced on October 18, 2009 in the event Dragon Gym & professional wrestling ring Noah combined performance.

Yabushita got her first victory in kickboxing by defeating Kanako Oka by decision (3-0) at Shoot boxing Osaka 2010 Alpinisme -Young Caesar Cup- on January 17, 2010. On March 28, 2010, Yabushita was defeated by Kozue "Azuma" Nagashima in a 3-0 decision in the event New Japan Kickboxing Federation: Neppuu Reisan.

On October 31, 2010 at Dragon Gym event Charity kickboxing event: No Name Heroes 10, Yabushita was defeated via unanimous decision by Monica, MAD 66 kg champion.

At the event J-Girls Women Festival 2010: The women who fight are beautiful on December 12, 2010, Yabushita had a rematch against Rie Murakami, who once again defeated Yabushita, this time by KO in the third round, successfully defending J-Girls lightweight title.

On February 27, 2011, Yabushita faced Seo Hee Ham for a second time at Gladiator 14 KOK Samurai Series. Yabushita lost the fight by TKO in the second round.

On August 19, 2011, Yabushita faced Hiroko Yamanaka in a shoot boxing match at the 2011 Shoot Boxing Girls S-Cup. She was defeated by TKO (doctor stoppage) due to a knee injury in round three.

== Outside sports ==
Yabushita has a younger sister named Yuka Yabushita (藪下由香, yabushita yuka) who is also a judoka.

Yabushita along with Yoko Takahashi left Jd' in 2002 and associated with Soft on Demand (SOD), one of the biggest adult film makers in Japan, and founded SOD Women's MMA Dojo and started to train MMA fighters. After some years, Yabushita and Takahashi decided to leave their partnership with SOD and closed their gym at the end of May 2006 and they formed their own team called Tomoe-gumi. This situation forced them to collaborate with Fang Gym in order to have a place to train. Members of Tomoe-gumi had differences with Fang Gym's policies and Yabushita and Takahashi were forced to disband the team by November 2007 and became freelance. They negotiated with Exit, a bar / live house in Shinjuku, Tokyo, to become bouncers at the place during the night and to use the live house space for their training and the amateur MMA shows free of charge during the day. When they decided to change the name of their team for a name that represented "girls that keep on fighting", they met with American clothing brand Fight Chix and contacted the company for a possible collaboration which was accepted. Yabushita and Takahashi renamed their team to Team Fight Chix. With their partnership, Yabushita and Takahashi are introducing, marketing and distributing Fight Chix products in the Japanese market.

Yabushita uses Kula Shaker's cover of Hush as her ring entrance theme in pro-wrestling. In MMA, she uses Visa's Fly Away song as her entrance theme.

== Mixed martial arts record ==
Professional record breakdown
42 matches	19 wins	23 losses
By knockout	1	4
By submission	10	6
By decision	7	13
By disqualification	1	0

Res.	Record	Opponent	Method	Event	Date	Round	Time	Location	Notes
Loss	19-23	Chan-Mi Jeon	TKO (punches)	All Fighting Championship 5	September 10, 2016	1	3:00	Incheon, South Korea	
Loss	19-22	Jade Marie Anderson	Technical Submission (armbar)	Gladiator: Dream, Power and Hope	April 21, 2013	1	2:33	Sapporo, Hokkaido, Japan	
Loss	19-21	Jade Marie Anderson	Decision (unanimous)	Jewels 22nd Ring	December 15, 2012	2	5:00	Ariake, Koto, Tokyo, Japan	
Loss	19-20	Shizuka Sugiyama	Decision (split)	Jewels 20th Ring	July 21, 2012	2	5:00	Ariake, Koto, Tokyo, Japan	
Loss	19-19	Kyoko Kimura	TKO (doctor stoppage)	Pancrase: Impressive Tour 11	November 12, 2011	1	5:00	Kabukicho, Tokyo, Japan	
Loss	19-18	Sarah Kaufman	TKO (punches)	AFC 5: Judgment Day	April 2, 2011	3	3:34	Victoria, British Columbia, Canada	
Loss	19-17	Rin Nakai	Decision (unanimous)	Valkyrie 06	June 19, 2010	3	3:00	Ariake, Koto, Tokyo, Japan	
Win	19-16	Mutsumi Kasai	Submission (scarf hold armlock)	Valkyrie 05	April 11, 2010	2	2:58	Ariake, Koto, Tokyo, Japan	
Loss	18-16	Shayna Baszler	Submission (twister)	Freestyle Cage Fighting 39	January 30, 2010	1	4:50	Shawnee, Oklahoma, United States	Freestyle Cage Fighting Women's Bantamweight Grand Prix first round
Win	18-15	Atsuko Emoto	Submission (armbar)	Jewels 5th Ring	September 13, 2009	1	2:43	Kabukicho, Tokyo, Japan	
Win	17-15	Emi Fujino	Decision (unanimous)	Demolition 080721	July 21, 2008	3	3:00	Ariake, Koto, Tokyo, Japan	
Loss	16-15	Julia Berezikova	Decision (unanimous)	FightFORCE: Russia vs. The World	April 19, 2008	3	5:00	Saint Petersburg, Russia	
Loss	16-14	Hitomi Akano	Submission (heel hook)	Smackgirl World ReMix Tournament 2008 Opening Round	February 14, 2008	2	4:16	Bunkyo, Tokyo, Japan	
Loss	16-13	Lana Stefanac	Decision (unanimous)	Smackgirl 7th anniversary: Starting Over	December 26, 2007	2	5:00	Bunkyo, Tokyo, Japan	
Loss	16-12	Lisa Ellis	Decision (unanimous)	Fatal Femmes Fighting Championship 3: War of the Roses	November 3, 2007	3	3:00	Compton, Los Angeles County, California, United States	
Win	16-11	Hiromi Kohata	Submission (armbar)	Smackgirl in Summerfest!!	July 26, 2007	1	0:15	Shibuya, Tokyo, Japan	
Loss	15-11	Ginele Marquez	Decision (unanimous)	Fatal Femmes Fighting Championship 2: The Crystal Brawl	July 14, 2007	3	3:00	Compton, Los Angeles County, California, United States	
Loss	15-10	Roxanne Modafferi	Decision (unanimous)	K-GRACE	May 27, 2007	2	3:00	Ariake, Koto, Tokyo, Japan	10,000 dollars contest open weight tournament semi-finals
Win	15-9	Jurgita Leitonaite	Submission (armbar)	K-GRACE	May 27, 2007	1	0:17	Ariake, Koto, Tokyo, Japan	10,000 dollars contest open weight tournament first round
Win	14-9	Mayumi Aoki	Decision (unanimous)	Smackgirl: The Dance of the Taisho Romance	April 28, 2007	2	5:00	Taisho, Osaka, Japan	
Win	13-9	Mizuho Sato	Decision (majority)	Shooto: Battle Mix Tokyo 2	March 30, 2007	2	5:00	Taito, Tokyo, Japan	
Loss	12-9	Laura D'Auguste	TKO (corner stoppage)	Ring of Combat 11	August 18, 2006	1	5:00	Atlantic City, New Jersey, United States	For Ring of Combat Women's Welterweight Championship
Loss	12-8	Roxanne Modafferi	Decision (unanimous)	G-Shooto: G-Shooto 05	May 6, 2006	2	5:00	Kabukicho, Tokyo, Japan	
Loss	12-7	Amanda Buckner	Submission (guillotine choke)	Smackgirl 2006: Advent of Goddess	February 15, 2006	1	3:45	Bunkyo, Tokyo, Japan	Lost Smackgirl open weight title
Loss	12-6	Laura D'Auguste	Decision (split)	Smackgirl 2005: Dynamic!!	August 17, 2005	3	5:00	Shibuya, Tokyo, Japan	First Middleweight Queen tournament final
Win	12-5	Asako Saioka	Submission (armbar)	Smackgirl 2005: Dynamic!!	August 17, 2005	1	2:44	Shibuya, Tokyo, Japan	First Middleweight Queen tournament semi-final
Win	11-5	Yong Joo Lee	Decision (unanimous)	WXF: X-Impact World Championships	July 9, 2005	3	5:00	Seoul, South Korea	
Win	10-5	Hyun Sung Kim	KO (slam)	Smackgirl: Cool Fighter's Last Stand	April 30, 2005	1	0:29	Numazu, Shizuoka, Japan	First Middleweight Queen tournament first round
Loss	9-5	Tara LaRosa	Decision (majority)	G-Shooto: G-Shooto 02	March 12, 2005	2	5:00	Aomi, Koto, Tokyo, Japan	
Win	9-4	Erin Toughill	DQ (elbows)	Smackgirl: World ReMix 2004	December 19, 2004	1	2:39	Shizuoka, Shizuoka, Japan	Open Weight Queen tournament final. Won Smackgirl Open Weight title
Win	8-4	Roxanne Modafferi	Decision (unanimous)	Smackgirl: World ReMix 2004	December 19, 2004	2	5:00	Shizuoka, Shizuoka, Japan	Open Weight Queen tournament semi-finals
Win	7-4	Shannon Hooper	Submission (wristlock)	Smackgirl: World ReMix 2004	December 19, 2004	1	0:29	Shizuoka, Shizuoka, Japan	Open Weight Queen tournament first round
Win	6-4	Hitomi Akano	Decision (unanimous)	G-Shooto: G-Shooto 01	November 26, 2004	2	5:00	Aomi, Koto, Tokyo, Japan	
Win	5-4	Shioya Yoshimi	Submission (armbar)	All Japan Women's Pro-Wrestling: Tag League: The Best	December 19, 2003	1	4:14	Setagaya, Tokyo, Japan	MMA rules
Win	4-4	Naoko Sakamoto	Submission (armbar)	Smackgirl: Third Season 4	June 4, 2003	1	0:23	Roppongi, Minato, Tokyo, Japan	
Loss	3-4	Asako Saioka	Decision (unanimous)	Smackgirl: Smack Legend 2002	June 1, 2002	3	5:00	Ariake, Tokyo, Japan	
Loss	3-3	Marloes Coenen	Submission (rear-naked choke)	Jd': No Holds Barred	January 13, 2002	1	2:27	Bunkyo, Tokyo, Japan	
Loss	3-2	Erin Toughill	Technical Submission (armbar)	ReMix: Golden Gate 2001	May 3, 2001	2	3:10	Shibuya, Tokyo, Japan	
Loss	3-1	Marloes Coenen	Decision (unanimous)	ReMix: World Cup 2000	December 5, 2000	3	5:00	Chiyoda, Tokyo, Japan	Open Weight tournament final
Win	3-0	Svetlana Goundarenko	Decision (unanimous)	ReMix: World Cup 2000	December 5, 2000	2	5:00	Chiyoda, Tokyo, Japan	Open Weight tournament semi-finals
Win	2-0	Bambi Bertoncello	Submission (armbar)	ReMix: World Cup 2000	December 5, 2000	1	2:07	Chiyoda, Tokyo, Japan	Open Weight tournament quarter-finals
Win	1-0	Ji Hee Yu	Submission (armbar)	CMA: Octagon Challenge	December 8, 1997	1	2:51	Nagoya, Aichi, Japan	

== Submission grappling ==
2 Fights, 1 Win, 1 Loss
Result	Record	Opponent	Method	Event	Date	Round	Time	Location	Notes
Loss	1-1-0	(Japan) Akiko Ninomiya	Submission (Rear-Naked Choke)	Smackgirl Grappling Queen Tournament 2007	September 24, 2007	1	5:56	Setagaya, Tokyo, Japan	Middleweight tournament final
Win	1-0-0	(Japan) Hitomi Sakamoto	Decision (25-0)	Smackgirl Grappling Queen Tournament 2007	September 24, 2007	1	N/A	Setagaya, Tokyo, Japan	Middleweight tournament semi-finals

Legend: Win Loss Draw/No contest

== Kickboxing and Shoot boxing record ==
13 Fights, 1 Win, 10 Losses, 1 Draw, 1 No Contest
Result	Record	Opponent	Method	Event	Date	Round	Time	Location	Notes
NC	1-10-1 (1)	(Brazil) Gabi Garcia	No Contest (illegal soccer kicks)	2017 Shoot Boxing Girls S-Cup	July 7, 2017	1		Shibuya, Tokyo, Japan
Loss	1-10-1	(Japan) Hiroko Yamanaka	TKO (Doctor Stoppage)	2011 Shoot Boxing Girls S-Cup	August 19, 2011	3	0:03	Shibuya, Tokyo, Japan
Loss	1-9-1	(South Korea) Seo Hee Ham	TKO (Punches)	Gladiator 14: KOK Samurai Series	February 27, 2011	2	0:55	Kabukicho, Tokyo, Japan
Loss	1-8-1	(Japan) Rie Murakami	KO (Punch)	J-Girls Women Festival 2010: The women who fight are beautiful	December 12, 2010	3	1:14	Koto, Tokyo, Japan	For J-Girls lightweight title
Loss	1-7-1	(Sweden) Monica	Decision (0-3)	Charity kickboxing event: No Name Heroes 10	October 31, 2010	3	2:00	Yuzawa, Akita Prefecture, Japan
Loss	1-6-1	(Japan) Kozue Nagashima	Decision (0-3)	New Japan Kickboxing Federation: Neppuu Reisan	March 28, 2010	3	3:00	Sendai, Miyagi, Japan
Win	1-5-1	(Japan) Kanako Oka	Decision (3-0)	Shoot Boxing Osaka 2010 Alpinisme -Young Caesar Cup-	January 17, 2010	3	2:00	Osaka, Osaka, Japan
Loss	0-5-1	(Japan) Mitsuki	Decision (0-3)	Dragon Gym & professional wrestling ring Noah combined performance	October 18, 2009	3	2:00	Sendai, Miyagi, Japan
Loss	0-4-1	(Japan) Rie Murakami	Decision (0-3)	Breathless Muay Thai 4	August 5, 2007	3	2:00	Sendai, Miyagi, Japan
Loss	0-3-1	(South Korea) Seo Hee Ham	Decision (0-3)	CMA Festival 2: Ikuhisa Minowa debut 10 anniversary tournament	July 23, 2007	3	2:00	Bunkyo, Tokyo, Japan	Kickboxing rules
Loss	0-2-1	(South Korea) Hyun Sung Kim	Decision (0-3)	CMA festival Japan vs. South Korea total war	May 24, 2006	2	3:00	Bunkyo, Tokyo, Japan
Draw	0-1-1	(Japan) Hikaru Shinohara	Time Limit Draw	Nyotei Produce: Belief - Kickboxing rules	June 12, 2005	3	2:00	Odaiba, Minato, Tokyo, Japan
Loss	0-1-0	(Japan) Yuko Okamoto	TKO (Match Abandoned, Dislocated Left Shoulder)	All-Japan Kickboxing Federation - Girls standing fight 1st. bout - Girls Shock!	January 26, 2003	2	2:00	Shimokitazawa, Setagaya, Tokyo, Japan

Legend: Win Loss Draw/No contest

== Championships and accomplishments ==
=== Judo ===
- All-Japan individual championships 1993 52 kg winner
- Fukuoka international women's judo championships 1994 52 kg third place
- World Masters Munich 1995 52 kg fifth place

=== Professional wrestling ===
- JDStar
  - AWF World Women's Championship (2 times)
  - Jd' Junior Championship (2 times)
  - TWF World Women's Tag Team Championship (3 times) – with Maru (1) and Sumie Sakai (2)
  - TWF World Women's Tag Team Title Tournament (2003) – with Maru
- JWP Joshi Puroresu
  - Daily Sports Women's Tag Team Championship (1 time) – with Command Bolshoi
  - JWP Tag Team Championship (1 time) – with Command Bolshoi
- World Woman Pro-Wrestling Diana
  - World Woman Pro-Wrestling Diana Tag Team Championship (1 time) – with Chikayo Nagashima

=== Mixed martial arts ===
- Smackgirl Open Weight Champion
- Smackgirl Open Weight Queen tournament winner
- Smackgirl First Middleweight Queen tournament runner-up
- ReMix Open Weight World Tournament 2000 runner-up

== See also ==
- List of female mixed martial artists
- List of female kickboxers
