= Strikeforce: Fedor vs. Rogers =

Mixed martial arts event in 2009

- The poster for Strikeforce: Fedor vs. Rogers
- Promotion: Strikeforce
- Date: November 7, 2009
- Venue: Sears Centre
- City: Hoffman Estates, Illinois, United States

Event chronology
Strikeforce: Carano vs. Cyborg	Strikeforce: Fedor vs. Rogers	Strikeforce: Evolution

Strikeforce/M-1 Global: Fedor vs. Rogers was a mixed martial arts event held on November 7, 2009, promoted by Strikeforce in association with M-1 Global. It was the first MMA event on network television since the now-defunct EliteXC promotion broadcast its final event, EliteXC: Heat, on CBS on October 4, 2008. The event had a four-fight main card with a broadcasting team of Gus Johnson, Frank Shamrock and Mauro Ranallo. The event drew an estimated 4,040,000 viewers, with a peak at 5,460,000 on CBS.

== Background ==
Gegard Mousasi was originally slated to defend his Strikeforce Light Heavyweight Championship, but eventually competed in a non-title bout.

A previously announced bout between Bobby Lashley and Ron Waterman was announced to have moved to a later date, though it never officially took place.

A women's bout between Marloes Coenen and Erin Toughill was set to serve as a reserve fight, but was cancelled when Toughill withdrew due to an undisclosed medical condition. Roxanne Modafferi stepped in to fight Coenen on this show.

EA Sports showed a preview trailer for the new EA Sports MMA game coming out in 2010 during the event.

A welterweight bout between Mark Miller and Deray Davis was scheduled for the undercard, but was canceled due to time issues.

== Results ==
Main card
Weight class				Method	Round	Time	Notes
Heavyweight	Fedor Emelianenko	def.	Brett Rogers	KO (punches)	2	1:48
Middleweight	Jake Shields	def.	Jason Miller	Decision (unanimous) (48–47, 49–46, 49–46)	5	5:00	(Note: For the vacant Strikeforce Middleweight Championship.)
Light Heavyweight	Gegard Mousasi	def.	Rameau Thierry Sokoudjou	TKO (punches)	2	3:43
Heavyweight	Fabrício Werdum	def.	Antônio Silva	Decision (unanimous) (29–28, 29–28, 29–28)	3	5:00
Preliminary card
Women's Featherweight	Marloes Coenen	def.	Roxanne Modafferi	Submission (armbar)	1	1:05
Catchweight (150 lb)	Jeff Curran	def.	Dustin Neace	TKO (rib injury)	1	1:39
Middleweight	Nate Moore	def.	Louis Taylor	TKO (Submission to punches)	2	3:24
Middleweight	Shamar Bailey	def.	John Kolosci	Decision (unanimous) (29–27, 29–27, 29–27)	3	5:00	(Note: Bailey was docked one point in round two for holding the shorts of Kolosci.)
Welterweight	Christian Uflacker	def.	Jonatas Novaes	Decision (unanimous) (30–25, 30–25, 29–26)	3	5:00	(Note: Novaes was docked two points in round three for two illegal kicks to the head of a downed opponent.)

== See also ==
- Strikeforce (mixed martial arts)
- List of Strikeforce champions
- List of Strikeforce events
- 2009 in Strikeforce

== Television ratings ==
In terms of ratings, the show averaged 3.79 million viewers for the allotted 9-11pm running time. The main event, which took place after 11pm, peaked at 5.46 million viewers. Overall, the two-hour-plus broadcast averaged 4.04 million viewers and a 2.5 household rating.
