= ZenQuest Martial Arts Center =

Martial arts training organization in Massachusetts

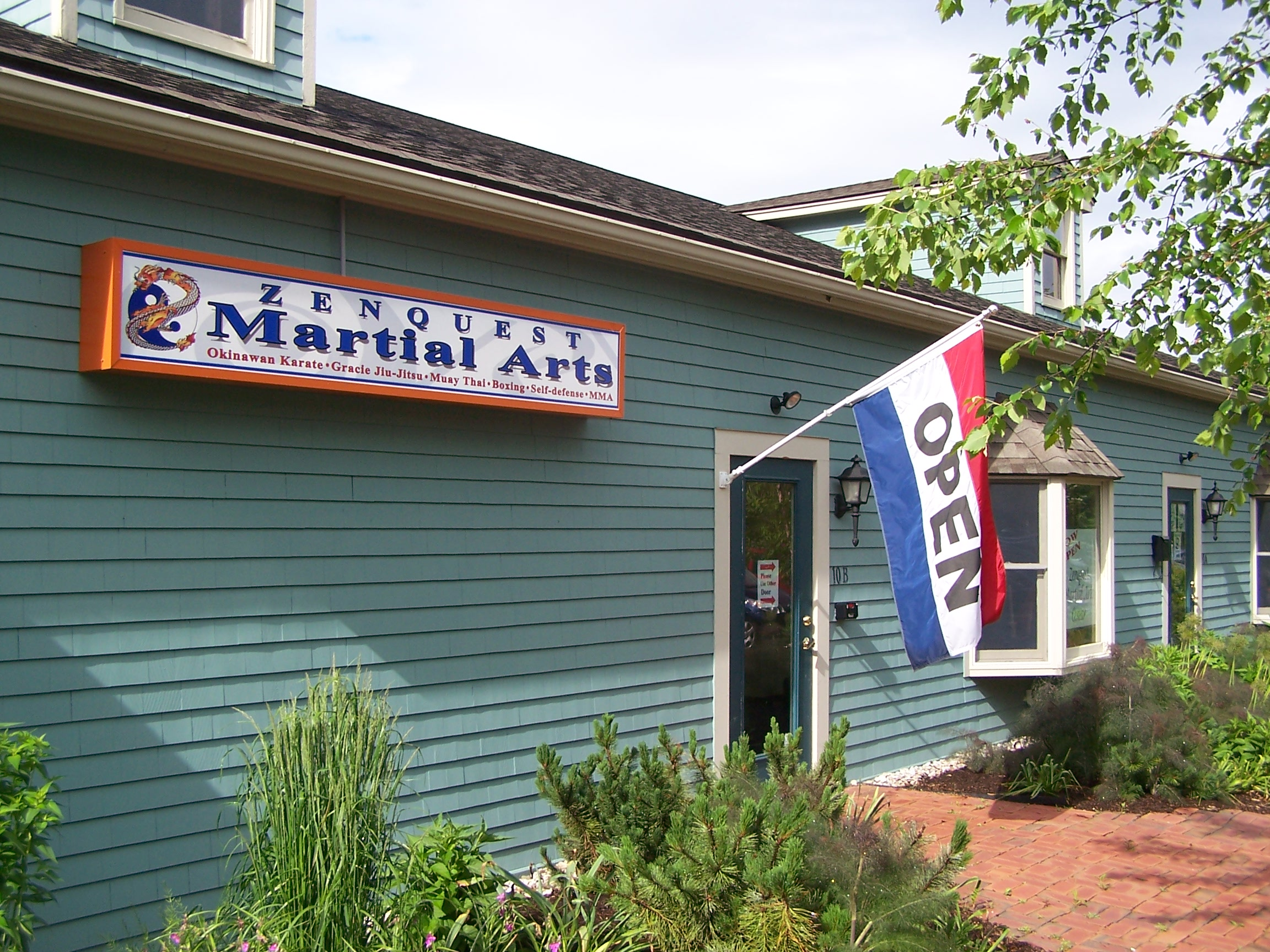
- Front of the ZenQuest Martial Arts Center building in Lenox Commons
- Also known as: Okinawan Karate School
- Date founded: 1972
- Country of origin: United States
- Founder: Frank Gorman
- Current head: Mark Flynn, Connie Flynn
- Arts taught: Uechi-ryu Karate; Brazilian Jiu-Jitsu; MMA; Sityodtong Muay Thai; Boxing; Self-defense; Wrestling; Kobudo
- Ancestor schools: Okinawan Karate-do Association; Team Sityodtong; Demian Maia Jiu-Jitsu Organization; North American Grappling Association
- Official website: zenquestmac.com

ZenQuest Martial Arts Center, formerly called the Okinawan Karate School, is a martial arts school located in Lenox, Massachusetts. The oldest martial arts school in Berkshire County, it was founded in 1972 as a dojo for Uechi-ryu karate. The school since expanded to include other martial arts, and currently provides instruction in Shohei-ryu karate (a spin-off of Uechi-ryu), Brazilian jiu-jitsu, mixed martial arts, Muay Thai, boxing, wrestling, kobudo, and self-defense, and is the fastest growing martial arts community in Berkshire County. The school also contains a store which provides equipment, gear, and instructional media. It is affiliated with the Okinawan Karatedo Association, Demian Maia Jiu-Jitsu Association, and Team Sityodtong Boston, and is accredited by the North American Grappling Association.

== History ==
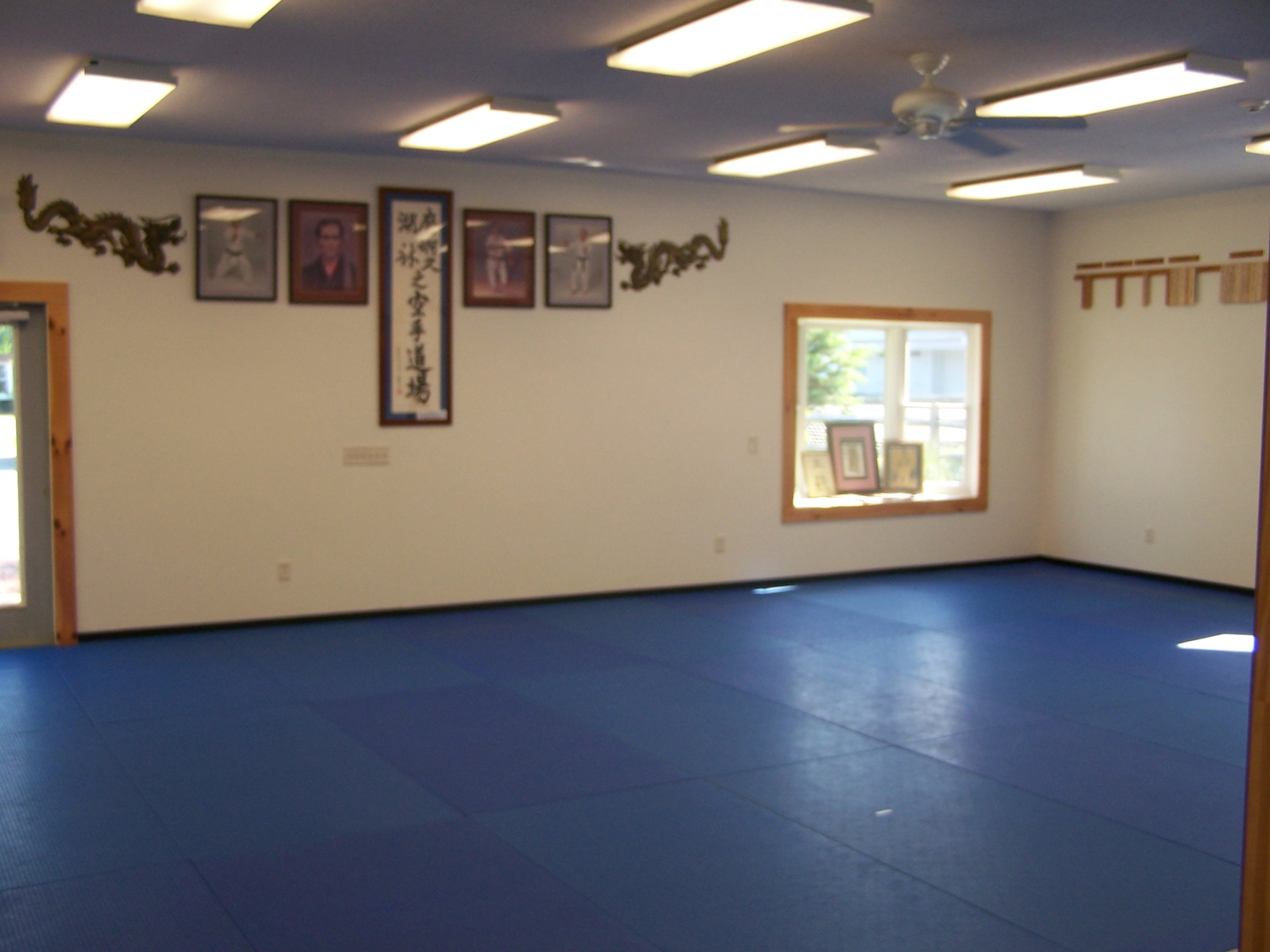
Training room #1 at ZenQuest Martial Arts Center

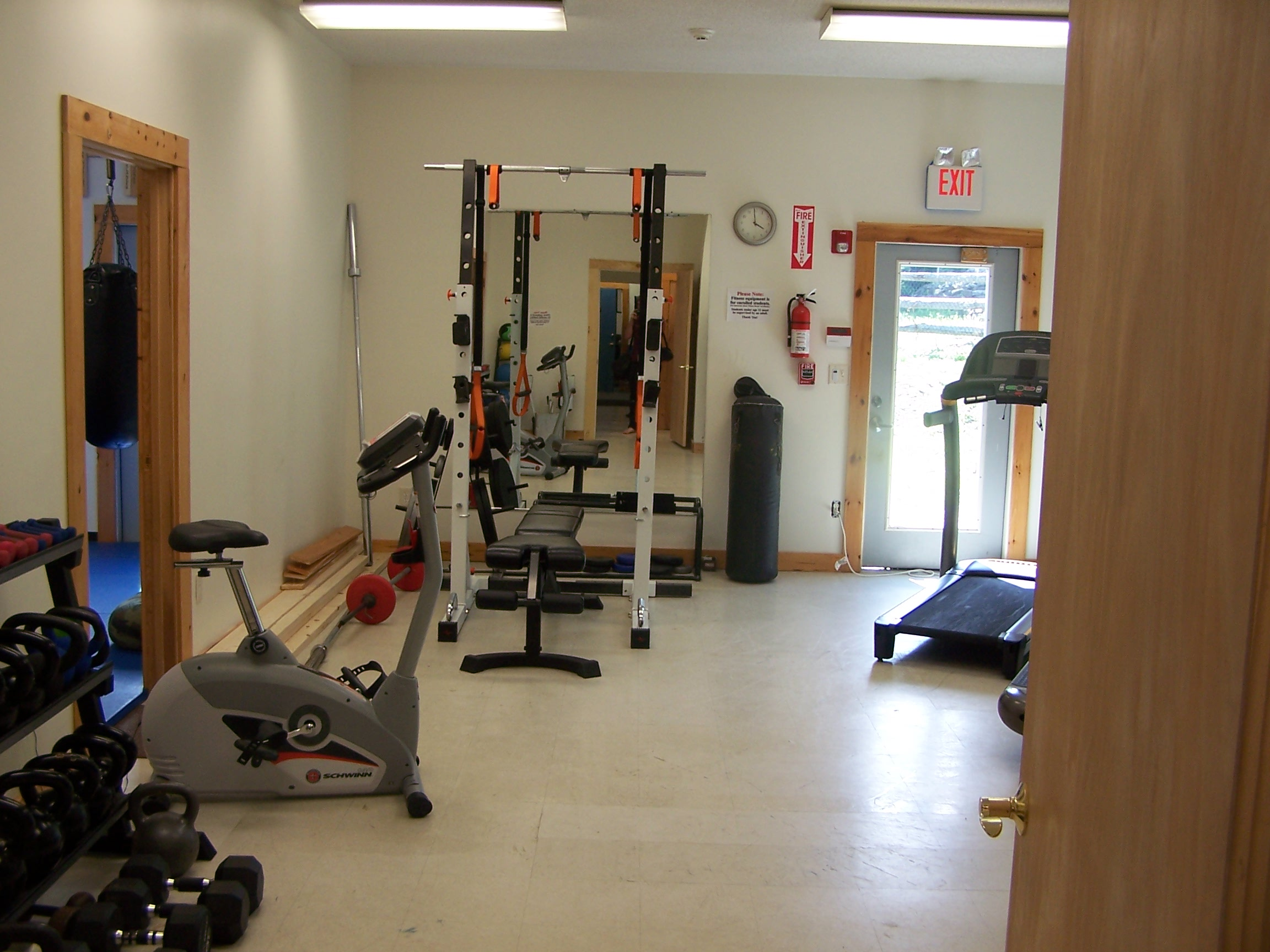
Exercise and weight room at ZenQuest Martial Arts Center

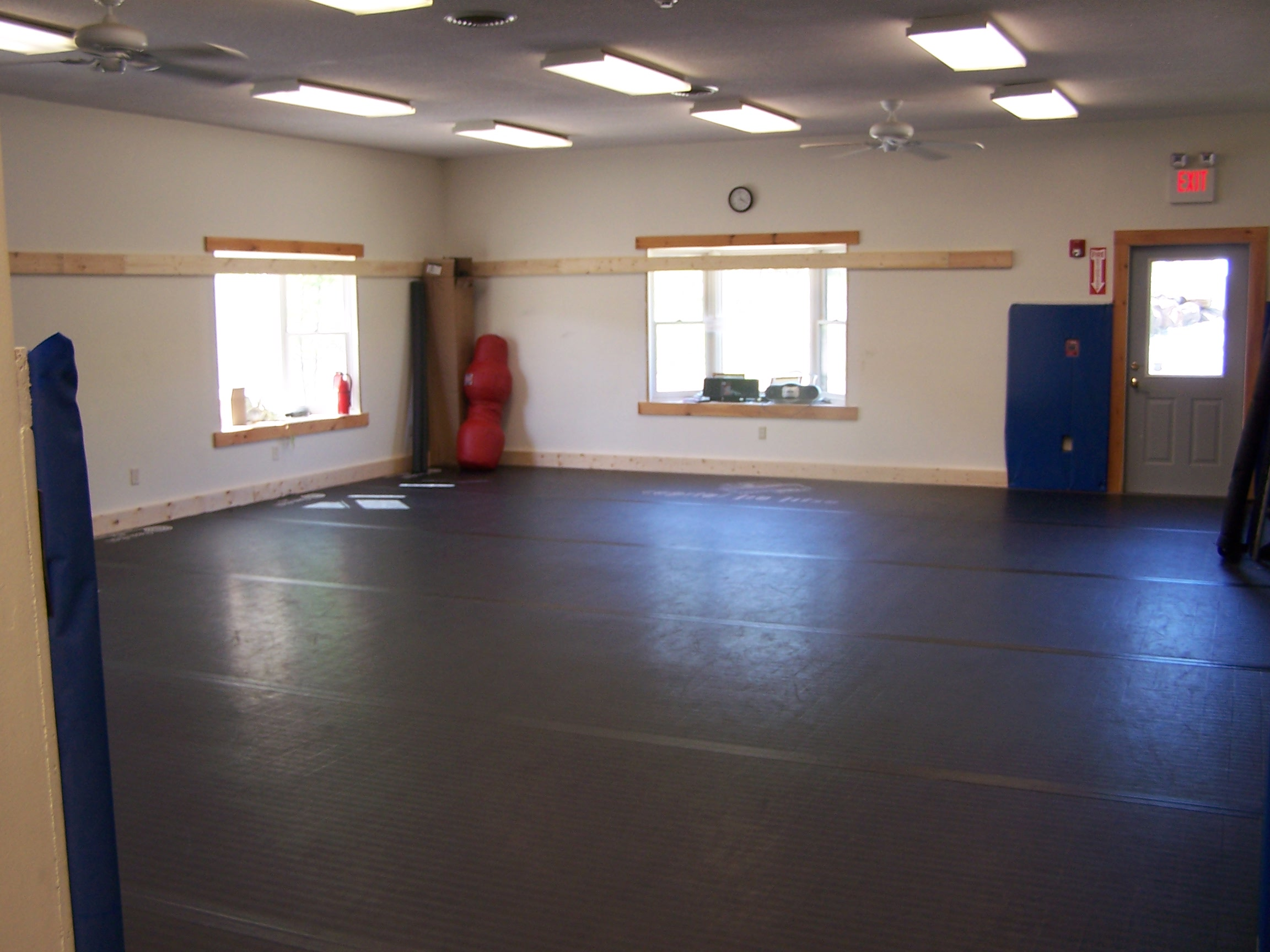
Training room #2 at ZenQuest Martial Arts Center

The school was originally based in Pittsfield, Massachusetts, and was opened on Lyman Street in 1972 by Sensei Frank Gorman, who according to Berkshires' Best Buys Business & Beyond introduced Uechi-ryu karate to Berkshire County. It is the oldest martial arts school in Berkshire County. In 1993 the school was moved to the Pittsfield Plaza on West Housatonic Street, developing a significant children's program. Senseis Mark and Connie Flynn took ownership of the school in August 2002. They previously lived and worked in Albany, New York, and ran a smaller satellite dojo in Guilderland. The Flynns purchased the school from Bob and Lisken Dus, who stated at the time that they were entering into retirement and would focus on providing support to the Flynns. In the fall of 2002, the Flynns widened the school's curriculum to include Brazilian "Gracie" jiu-jitsu. Mixed martial arts classes were added later. The Flynns traveled to Okinawa, Japan, in 2003, 2007 and 2012 for training with world leaders in Uechi-Ryu/Shohei-Ryu. During the 2007 trip Mrs. Flynn was promoted to 5th Dan, and both attended the 2007 All Okinawa Championships, a worldwide championship event. Sensei Connie took third place in kata, while Sensei Mark managed to reach fourth in kumite. In 2010, due to deterioration of the Pittsfield Plaza where it was located, and the need for additional space, the school relocated to Lenox Commons in Lenox, where it changed its name from Okinawan Karate School to ZenQuest Martial Arts Center. Along with this relocation and name change the school updated classes to a full roster which includes Muay Thai kickboxing, boxing, wrestling and mixed martial arts. The school is now the largest martial arts community in Berkshire County. In 2016, Mark Flynn received a belt-belt in Brazilian jiu-jitsu, becoming the third person in Berkshire County to achieve that high a rank in the art and the second in the United States to be awarded a black belt by Demian Maia.

== Events and seminars ==
The school has received regular coverage by The Berkshire Eagle and Pittsfield Cable Television, including the school's annual hosting of a youth tournament and black belt promotions, and in 2002 was noted for helping a teen overcome disabilities.

In 2005, the dojo made the headline story in The Berkshire Eagle for hosting a special camp called “Tokkun 2005” at Cross Athletic Center at Miss Hall's School. The camp featured visiting karate masters from Okinawa, specifically Senseis Shigeru Takamiyagi (9 dan), Toshio Higa (8 dan), Hirokuni Yamashiro (7 dan), and Sakae Uechi (5 dan), and in addition to local students in Berkshire County had additional students from more distant areas such as Florida, New Jersey, Michigan, New York, Vermont, and Cape Cod. Another event that received attention from The Berkshire Eagle was a visit from mixed martial arts and jiu-jitsu legend Royce Gracie, who held a clinic at the dojo in 2009. The year before, 2008, another jiu-jitsu clinic had been held with Robert “Crush” Kahn. Several seminars are held every year with notable members from the Okinawan Karate-do Association and Sityodtong Muay Thai. After ZenQuest left the Royce Gracie Jiu-Jitsu network and joined Demian Maia's organization, Demian Maia held a seminar at the school on November 2, 2012, garnering attention from The Berkshire Eagle.

== Affiliation and associated schools ==
ZenQuest Martial Arts Center is a member of the Okinawan Karatedo Association, which is located in Okinawa and is the worldwide governing body for Shohei-ryu karate, and Team Sityodtong, a Muay Thai training camp based in Somerville, Massachusetts. The dojo was also an affiliate of the Gracie Jiu-Jitsu Network, but the termination of its association with the Network was announced on February 2, 2012. On February 18, the dojo announced that its jiu-jitsu program would be under Demian Maia. The school is accredited by the North American Grappling Association. ZenQuest maintains an affiliation with Mike Torres' Torres Advanced Combat Systems classes taught at the Quest Karate and Pace Karate schools in New Jersey.

== Competitions ==
=== Karate ===
==== 2007 All-Okinawa Championships ====
In 2007, Senseis Mark and Connie Flynn competed in the 2007 All-Okinawa Championships in Okinawa, which featured competitors from throughout the world. The results for the Flynns were as follows:

Name	Place	Division
Connie Flynn	3rd Place (Win)	Women's Kata
Mark Flynn	4th Place (No win) / Competed (No win)	Kumite / Kata

==== Battle for Boston 2012 ====
On April 22, 2012, ZenQuest competed in the Battle for Boston karate open tournament at Tufts University in Medford, Massachusetts, five miles from Boston. The win was as follows:

Name	Win	Event
Chris Mattoon	3rd place	Men's Advanced Kata Ages 18–34

=== Grappling ===
ZenQuest Martial Arts center has participated in numerous grappling competitions, the following is a list of wins captured by the school.

==== Rhode Island, 2010 ====
On October 16, 2010, On June 4, 2011, students from ZenQuest Martial Arts Center competed in the 2011 NAGA East Coast Championship in Lincoln, Rhode Island. The school took several wins, which are listed as follows:

Name	Win	Division
Jedd Hall	2nd / 3rd	Mens No-Gi Directors Expert Middle Weight / Mens GI Directors Expert Middle Weight
John Soules	1st place / 2nd place	Mens Masters No-Gi Intermediate Light Heavy Weight / Mens Gi Masters Blue Belt Light Heavy Weight

==== Rhode Island, 2011 ====
On January 29, ZenQuest students competed in the NAGA New England Championship in Lincoln, Rhode Island. The school's win is as follows:

Name	Win	Division
David Solis	1st / 1st	Mens No-Gi Absolute Novice / Mens Gi White Belt Light Heavy Weight

==== Springfield, 2011 ====
On June 4, 2011, students from ZenQuest Martial Arts Center competed in the 2011 NAGA East Coast Championship in Springfield, Massachusetts. The school took several wins, which are listed as follows:

Name	Win	Division
Connor T. Faulkner	3rd place	Mens No-Gi Novice Fly Weight
Daniel Mazzeo	2nd place	Masters No-Gi Novice Light Weight
Jedd L. Hall	1st place / 1st place	Mens No-Gi Directors Expert Middle Weight / Mens Gi Directors Expert Middle Weight
Jordan Bradford	1st place	Kids Gi Novice 50 to 59.9 lb (22.7 to 27.2 kg). 7 & 8 year olds
Rick Byers	3rd place / 3rd place	Mens No-Gi Intermediate Light Heavy Weight / Mens Gi Blue Belt Light Heavy Weight
Robert Blessin	1st place	Mens No-Gi Novice Welter Weight Division
Sherman Somerville	3rd place	Mens Gi Blue Belt Light Weight

==== Hartford, 2011 ====
On July 30, 2011, students from ZenQuest competed in the NAGA Hartford event in Hartford, Connecticut. The school's wins are as follows:

Name	Win	Division
Cameron Loehr	1st place	Gi Advanced Teen
Connor T. Faulkner	2nd place / 2nd place	Mens No-Gi Novice Bantam Weight / Mens Gi Novice Flyweight
Tony Riello	1st place	Mens No-Gi Masters Cruiser Weight

==== Northeast Championship, 2011 ====
On October 15, 2011, students from ZenQuest competed in the NAGA Northeast Championship. The results are as follows:

Name	Win	Division
Chris Bradley	3rd place	Boys Gi 70 to 79.9 lb (31.8 to 36.2 kg)
Connor T. Faulkner	3rd place	Mens Gi White Belt Fly Weight
Colleen Garrity	2nd place	Girls No-Gi Beginner 115 to 129.9 lb (52.2 to 58.9 kg) 16 & 17 yr olds
Noah Farevaag	3rd place / 2nd place	Boys No-Gi Novice 80 to 89.9 lb (36.3 to 40.8 kg) 9 to 11 yr olds / Boys Gi Beginner 80 to 89.9 lb (36.3 to 40.8 kg) 11 yrs old
Robert Blessin	3rd place	Mens No-Gi Beginner Welter Weight
Stephen Taglieri	2nd place / 2nd place / 1st place	Boys Gi Intermediate 115 to 129.9 lb (52.2 to 58.9 kg) 11 & 12 years old / Boys No-Gi Intermediate 115 to 129.9 lb (52.2 to 58.9 kg) 11 & 12 years old / Boys Gi Beginner
Timothy Somerville	2nd place / 2nd place	Mens No-Gi Intermediate Bantam-Weight / Mens Gi Blue-Belt Bantam-Weight

==== Rhode Island, 2012 ====
On January 28, 2012, ZenQuest returned to Lincoln, Rhode Island for the New England Championship. Wins are as follows:

Name	Win	Division
Cooper Shepardson	1st place / 1st place	Kids No-Gi Novice 49.9 lb (22.6 kg) and 7-8 year olds / Kids Gi Novice 49.9 lb (22.6 kg) and 7-8 year olds
Jack Purcell	1st place / 1st place	Kids No Gi Novice 60 to 69.9 lb (27.2 to 31.7 kg) 9 yr olds / Kids Gi Novice 60 to 69.9 lb (27.2 to 31.7 kg) 9 yr olds
James Purcell	3rd place	Kids Gi Novice 50 to 59.9 lb (22.7 to 27.2 kg) 7 - 8 year olds
Jordan Bradford	3rd place / 3rd place	Girls No-Gi Beginner 50 to 59.9 lb (22.7 to 27.2 kg) & 8-9 year olds / Girls Gi Beginner 50 to 59.9 lb (22.7 to 27.2 kg)

==== Albany, 2012 ====
On March 10, 2012, ZenQuest competed at Albany, New York. The schools wins are as follows:

Name	Win	Division
Brandon Lucchese	1st place	Men's No-Gi Novice Bantam Weight
Colleen Garrity	2nd place / 3rd place	Women's No-Gi Novice Fly Weight / Women's Gi White Belt Fly Weight
Cooper Shepardson	2nd place	Kids' No-Gi Beginner 50 to 59.9 lb (22.7 to 27.2 kg) 8-9 year olds
Jack Purcell	3rd place / 3rd place	Kids' No-Gi Beginner 60 to 69.9 lb (27.2 to 31.7 kg) / Kids' Gi Beginner 60 to 69.9 lb (27.2 to 31.7 kg) 8-9 year olds
James Purcell	1st place / 1st place	Kids' No-Gi Novice 50 to 59.9 lb (22.7 to 27.2 kg) / Kids' Gi Novice 50 to 59.9 lb (22.7 to 27.2 kg)
Jordan Bradford	1st place / 2nd place	Girls No-Gi Beginner 60 to 69.9 lb (27.2 to 31.7 kg) / Girls Gi Beginner 50 to 59.9 lb (22.7 to 27.2 kg) 8-9 year olds
Jedd L. Hall	2nd place / 1st place	Men's No-Gi Expert Welter Weight / Directors' Gi Expert Middle Weight
Neil Von Flatern	3rd place	Men's Gi White Belt Welter Weight
Samuel Johnson	2nd place	Kids' Gi Beginner 80 to 89.9 lb (36.3 to 40.8 kg) 11 years old
Stephen Taglieri	3rd place / 3rd place	Kids' No-Gi Beginner 115 to 129.9 lb (52.2 to 58.9 kg) / Kids' Gi Beginner 115 to 129.9 lb (52.2 to 58.9 kg) 10-12 year olds

==== East Coast 2012 ====
On May 5, 2012, ZenQuest competed at NAGA East Coast Championship in West Warwick, Rhode Island.

Name	Win	Division
Conner Faulkner	2nd place / 2nd place	Mens No-Gi Intermediate Bantam Weight / Mens Gi Blue Belt Fly Weight
Robert Blessin	3rd place	Mens No-Gi Intermediate Middle Weight

==== Schenectady, 2012 ====
On September 8, 2012, ZenQuest competed at NAGA New York in Schenectady, New York.

Name	Win	Division
Colleen Garrity	2nd place / 3rd place	Women's No-Gi Beginner Light Weight / Women's Gi White Belt Light Weight
Conner Faulkner	2nd place / 2nd place	Men's No-Gi Intermediate Fly Weight / Men's Gi Blue Belt Fly Weight
Neil Von Flatern	2nd place	Men's Gi White Belt Middle Weight
Robert Blessin	1st place	Men's No-Gi Intermediate Welter Weight
Scott Stetz	2nd place / 2nd place	Masters' No-Gi Novice Cruiser Weight / Masters' Gi White Belt Cruiser Weight

==== New England Championship 2013 ====
On January 26–27, 2013, ZenQuest competed at the New England Championship in West Warwick, Rhode Island.

Name	Win	Division
Bryan Rahilly	3rd place	Mens No-Gi Novice Light Weight
Caleb Pollard	1st place / 1st place	Kids Kids No-Gi Novice 50 to 59.9 lb (22.7 to 27.2 kg) 9 & 10 year olds / Kids Gi Novice 50 to 59.9 lb (22.7 to 27.2 kg) 9 & 10 year olds
Neil Von Flatern	3rd place	Mens No-Gi Intermediate Middle Weight
Shannon Pollard	2nd place / 2nd place	Girls No-Gi Novice 51 to 54 lb (23 to 24 kg) 7 years old / Girls Gi Novice 51 to 54 lb (23 to 24 kg) 7 years old
Stephen Taglieri	2nd place / 1st place	Kids No-Gi Intermediate 130 to 149.9 lb (59.0 to 68.0 kg) 13 years old / Kids Novice No-Gi 130 to 139.9 lb (59.0 to 63.5 kg)

==== Albany, 2013 ====
On March 16, 2013, ZenQuest competed at the NAGA Albany in Albany, New York.

Name	Win	Division
Jack Purcell	1st place / 2nd place	Kids' No-Gi Beginner 70 to 79.9 lb (31.8 to 36.2 kg) / Kids' Gi Beginner 70 to 79.9 lb (31.8 to 36.2 kg)
Caleb Pollard	2nd place / 2nd place	Kids' No-Gi Beginner 50 to 59.9 lb (22.7 to 27.2 kg), 9-10 year olds / Kids' Gi Beginner 50 to 59.9 lb (22.7 to 27.2 kg), 9-10 year olds
Shannon Pollard	1st place / 1st place	Girl's No-Gi Novice / Girl's Gi Novice
Jordan Bradford	2nd place / 3rd place	Girl's No-Gi Intermediate / Girl's Gi Intermediate
Chris Clark	3rd place	Men's No-Gi Novice Welter Weight
Matt Gerlitz	1st place / 1st place	Masters' No-Gi Novice Middle Weight / Masters' Gi White Belt Middle Weight
Jedd L. Hall	2nd place / 1st place	Directors' No-Gi Expert Middle Weight / Directors' Gi Expert Middle Weight

==== Manchester, 2013 ====
On April 6, 2013, ZenQuest competed at the New England Submission Challenge in Manchester, Connecticut.

Name	Win	Division
Matt Gerlitz	Silver	No-Gi 170 to 184.9 lb (77.1 to 83.9 kg)

==== Plymouth, 2013 ====
On April 20, 2013, ZenQuest competed at the North American Pankration and Grappling Association Pankration Championships at Plymouth, Massachusetts. Their wins are as follows:

Name	Win
Chris Clark	2nd place in division
Neil Von Flattern	1st place in division
Ricky Chiu	3rd place in division

==== East Coast 2013 ====
On May 4, 2013, ZenQuest competed at the NAGA East Coast Championship in Danbury, Connecticut.

Name	Win	Division
Nicole Viale	2nd place / 2nd place	Women's No-Gi Novice Light Heavy Weight / Women's White Belt Middle Weight
