= Jewels 18th Ring =

Mixed martial arts event in 2011

- The poster for Jewels 18th Ring
- Promotion: Jewels
- Date: March 3, 2012
- Venue: Shin-Kiba 1st Ring
- City: Koto, Tokyo, Japan
- Attendance: 370

Event chronology
Jewels 17th Ring	Jewels 18th Ring	Jewels 19th Ring

Jewels 18th Ring was a mixed martial arts (MMA) event held by promotion Jewels on March 3, 2012 at Shin-Kiba 1st Ring in Koto, Tokyo, Japan.

== Results ==
=== Opening card ===
- 1st opening fight: Jewels amateur kickboxing rules -49 kg, 2:00 x 2 rounds

(Japan) Miki (WSR Fairtechs) vs. (Japan) Akiko Someya (BomboFreely)

Someya defeated Siki by unanimous decision (20-17, 20-18, 20-18).

- 2nd opening fight: Jewels amateur kickboxing rules -54 kg, 2:00 x 2 rounds

(Japan) Wano Sato (Shinko Muay Thai Gym) vs. (Japan) Reina Matsuda (y-park)

Matsuda defeated Sato by unanimous decision (20-18, 20-18, 20-19).

- 3rd opening fight: Jewels amateur rules -47.5 kg, 4:00 x 1 round

(Japan) Satomi Takano (Club Barbarian) vs. (Japan) Miyuki Irie (Alliance Narita)

Takano defeated Irie by submission (Guillotine Choke) at 1:05 of round 1.

=== Main card ===
- 1st match: Jewels grappling rules -51 kg, 4:00 / 2 rounds

(Japan) Miyoko Kusaka (Grabaka Gym) vs. (Japan) Mina Kurobe (K Taro Dojo)

Kusaka defeated Kurobe by submission (leg scissor choke) at 3:17 of round 2.

- 2nd match: Jewels official rules -52 kg bout, 5:00 x 2 rounds

(Norway) Celine Haga (Team Hellboy Hansen) vs. (Japan) Ayame Miura (Free)

Miura defeated Haga by submission (keylock) at 2:12 of round 2.

- 3rd match: Jewels official rules -52 kg bout, 5:00 x 2 rounds

(Japan) Emi Tomimatsu (Paraestra Matsudo) vs. (Japan) Yuko Oya (DEEP OFFICIAL GYM IMPACT)

Tomimatsu defeated Oya by unanimous decision.

- 4th match: Jewels kickboxing rules -61.5 kg bout, 2:00 / 3 rounds

(Japan) Yui Takada (Mine Kokorokai) vs. (Japan) Satoko Ozawa (Team Dragon)

Takada defeated Ozawa by majority decision (30-28, 30-29, 29-29).

- 5th match: Jewels official rules -53.5 kg bout, 5:00 x 2 rounds

(Japan) Mizuki Inoue (White Heart Karate Association) vs. (Australia) Alexandra Chambers (VT-1 Gym)

Inoue defeated Chambers by submission (armbar) at 4:32 of round 1.

- 6th match: Jewels official rules -58 kg bout, 5:00 x 2 rounds

(United States) Roxanne Modafferi (Wajutsu Keishukai Hearts) vs. (Japan) Takayo Hashi (Wajutsu Keishukai Akza)

Hashi defeated Modafferi by unanimous decision.

- 7th match: Jewels official rules -52 kg bout, 5:00 x 2 rounds

(Japan) Mika Nagano (Core) vs. (Japan) Emi Fujino (Wajutsu Keishukai Gods)

Fujino defeated Nagano by unanimous decision.
