= Mark DellaGrotte =

American Muay Thai kickboxer and coach

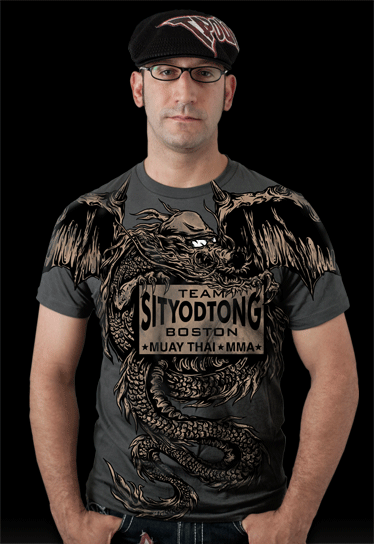
- Born: November 14, 1974 (age 51)
- Nationality: American
- Style: Muay Thai
- Team: Sityodtong USA

Mark DellaGrotte (born November 14, 1974) is an American former professional Muay Thai kickboxer and a trainer in Muay Thai. He is the owner and operator of the Sityodtong USA Branch in Somerville, Massachusetts, and was certified and appointed by Master Yodtong to be recognized as an international conservator of Thai style boxing. Mark also has extensive training and is certified in the arts of escrima, Pencak Silat, Jeet Kune Do, savate, and Brazilian jiu-jitsu.

== Background ==
DellaGrotte, known for his Boston accent, is a featured kickboxing trainer in Spike TV's "The Ultimate Fighter 4." He also has trained mixed martial arts fighters like Kenny Florian, Frank Mir, Stephan Bonnar, Marcus Davis, Alex Karalexis, Jorge Rivera and Patrick Côté .

DellaGrotte is the owner and operator of the Sityodtong USA Branch. He began his martial arts studies at an early age. His initial training involved classical martial arts, such as taekwondo, Shotokan karate, and tai chi. As his athleticism and martial skills grew, so did his desire to further his training in the martial arts.

In 1992, his quest for a more combative martial art was complete when he met Guro Guy Chase, who had studied with some of the greatest martial artists of his time. Guro Chase had trained with Dan Inosanto, Ben Lagusa, Herman Suwanda, Ted Lucay, Salam Allsi, Surachai Sirisute and even Karl Gotch.

At that point, Mark devoted himself entirely to the martial arts. Through this training he became certified in the arts of Jun Fan Jeet Kune Do, Indonesian Pencak Silat, Boxe Francaise savate, Filipino kali-escrima, submission wrestling and Muay Thai kickboxing.

DellaGrotte was first introduced to Muay Thai in 1997 when he was taken by a friend to the famed Yodtong boxing camp in Pattaya where he lived and trained. After proving his worth as a student and a fighter he was looked favorably upon by Kru Yodtong himself, a famous Muay Thai instructor who also takes in troubled youths. After eight years Kru Yodtong, as he’s known professionally, designated DellaGrotte as his representative in the United States to teach and preserve the art. In honor of his mentor, DellaGrotte named his gym Sityodtong, which means, "Student of Yodtong".

Since he had taught martial arts prior to his fight career, he decided to step into the ring only to become a better trainer and teacher. So, he traveled throughout Thailand learning different styles of Southeast Asian martial arts such as Mae Mai Muay Thai, Kun Khmer, Muay Boran, Muay Lao, and also Burmese boxing.

Contrary to general belief he has, by his own admission, less than 10 fights, most of which were held in Thailand. He says he has a winning record but admits a few losses one of which was to BOLTON UK Thai-boxer Nigel Green comfortably winning after three rounds in New York. The 30-year-old qualified instructor from Little Lever UK fought at the Big Apple's World Gym in Long Island in July 1999.

Master Yodtong Senanan appointed Mark to teach, conserve and promote Thai style boxing worldwide. He is one of two of Kru Yodtong's US representatives and is honored to be an international conservator of Thai style boxing.

Mark portrays himself as a striking coach to fictional character Scott Voss (played by Kevin James) in the 2012 sports comedy film Here Comes the Boom.

== Personal life ==
DellaGrotte and his wife, Marie, have a son named Dante and daughter named Giovanna.
