= Team Sityodtong =

Mixed martial arts training organization in Massachusetts

Coordinates: 42.387209°N 71.083345°W

Sityodtong USA
- Founded by: Kru Yodtong
- Primary owners: Kru Mark Dellagrotte
- Prominent fighters: Calvin Kattar; Rob Font; Marcus Davis; Dale Hartt; Patrick Côté
- Training facilities: Headquarters: Pattaya, Chonburi, Thailand (See complete list)
- Website: (Sityodtong USA)

Sityodtong USA, also known as Team Sityodtong, is a Muay Thai and mixed martial arts training camp based out of Somerville, Massachusetts. The headquarters of Sityodtong Camp is in Pattaya, Thailand. Its Grandmaster is Yodtong Senanan and he has produced 57 Muay Thai Champions, the largest number in the history of Muay Thai in Thailand. The owner and head trainer of Sityodtong Boston, Mark DellaGrotte, is a teacher of various styles of Muay Thai such as Mae Mai Muay Thai, Pradal Serey, Muay Boran, Muay Lao, and also Burmese Boxing. The team members includes MMA fighters such as Calvin Kattar, Rob Font, Marcus Davis, Dale Hartt, and Patrick Côté.

Between UFC 67 and UFC 85, Team Sityodtong did not lose a fight in the UFC.

== Training locations ==
Country	Location	Gym Name
Australia	Brunswick, Melbourne, Victoria	The Sityodtong Muay Thai Academy
Australia	Chelsea Heights, Melbourne, Victoria	Kimekai MMA
Finland	Porvoo, Uusimaa	Porvoo Thaiboxing Club
Netherlands	Amsterdam	Sityodtong Muay Thai
Mexico	Puerto Vallarta, Jalisco	Sityodtong Vallarta
Singapore	Singapore	Evolve Far East Square
Singapore	Singapore	Evolve Pomo Mall
Switzerland	Lugano	Sityodtong Boxing Camp Swiss Branch
Thailand	Pattaya City, Chonburi	Sityodtong - Pattaya
United States	Monrovia, California	Sityodtong – Los Angeles
United States	Camarillo, California	Sityodtong 805
United States	Chicago, Illinois	Chicago Mixed Martial Arts
United States	Biddeford, Maine	Team Irish Mixed Martial Arts
United States	Brewer, Maine	Team Irish Mixed Martial Arts
United States	Bellingham, Massachusetts	USMMA
United States	Beverly, Massachusetts	Sityodtong North Shore
United States	Lenox, Massachusetts	ZenQuest Martial Arts Center
United States	Plymouth, Massachusetts	Cape Cod Fighting Alliance
United States	Somerville, Massachusetts	Sityodtong – Boston
United States	Wareham, Massachusetts	Nexus Martial Arts
United States	Las Vegas, Nevada	Peter Pinto
United States	Derry, New Hampshire	Tim Barchards Professional Martial Arts
United States	Greenland, New Hampshire	Guy Chase Academy of Martial Arts
United States	West Chester, Ohio	Jorge Gurgel Mixed Martial Arts Academy
United States	Easton, Pennsylvania	Nak Muay Gym
Vietnam	Ho Chi Minh City, Vietnam	Optimistart Mixed Martial Arts
