= Sakura Nomura =

Japanese judoka

- Born: November 22, 1976 (age 49); Ishikawa Prefecture, Japan
- Nationality: Japanese
- Height: 1.58 m (5 ft 2 in)
- Weight: 52 kg (115 lb)
- Division: Lightweight (Jewels)
- Style: Kickboxing, Judo, BJJ
- Fighting out of: Japan
- Team: Club Barbarian Impact
- Rank: blue belt in Brazilian Jiu-Jitsu
- Years active: 2010-present

Kickboxing record
- Total: 1
- Wins: 1

Mixed martial arts record
- Total: 4
- Wins: 3
- By submission: 1
- By decision: 2
- Losses: 1
- By decision: 1

Other information
- Occupation: Company employee
- University: Takaoka University of Law
- Website: Official blog
- Mixed martial arts record from Sherdog
- Last updated on: August 1, 2011

Sakura Nomura (能村 さくら, nomura sakura; born on November 22, 1976) is a Japanese female mixed martial artist and kickboxer.

== Background ==
Nomura was born on November 22, 1976 in Ishikawa Prefecture, Japan.

== Martial arts training ==
While attending the Takaoka University of Law, Nomura achieved third place in 1996 and second place in 1998 at the All Japan Student Judo Championships in the -56 kg and -57 kg categories, respectively.

At a Brazilian Jiu-Jitsu Asia Open held on September 11 and 12, 2010 at the Tokyo Budokan, Nomura won first place in the blue belt category.

== Mixed martial arts career ==
Nomura made her professional MMA debut with the Jewels promotion on March 19, 2010 at Jewels 7th Ring. She defeated Yuko Kagoshima by technical submission after the referee stopped the fight when Nomura caught Kagoshima with an armbar in the second round.

In her second fight, Nomura participated in Deep's event Club Deep Toyama: Barbarian Festival 8 on May 16, 2010, defeating Abe Ani Combat Club member Rina Tomita by unanimous decision.

In an upset, Nomura defeated Jewels hotshot Saori Ishioka by unanimous decision during the first round of the Jewels Lightweight Queen tournament on July 31, 2010 at Jewels 9th Ring.

At Jewels 11th Ring on December 17, 2010 during the semi-finals of the Lightweight Queen tournament, Nomura suffered her first professional defeat via unanimous decision at the hands of eventual tournament champion Ayaka Hamasaki.

Nomura was scheduled to face Ji Yun Kim at Jewels 12th Ring on March 11, 2011 in Tokyo, Japan, but the event was cancelled after the Tōhoku earthquake and tsunami earlier in the day.

== Kickboxing career ==
Nomura had a shoot boxing match at Jewels 10th Ring on October 10, 2010, where she defeated Yoshimi Ohama by unanimous decision.

== Mixed martial arts record ==
Professional record breakdown
4 matches	3 wins	1 loss
By submission	1	0
By decision	2	1

Res.	Record	Opponent	Method	Event	Date	Round	Time	Location	Notes
Loss	3-1	Ayaka Hamasaki	Decision (0-3)	Jewels 11th Ring	December 17, 2010	2	5:00	Bunkyo, Tokyo, Japan	Jewels Lightweight Queen tournament semi-finals
Win	3-0	Saori Ishioka	Decision (3-0)	Jewels 9th Ring	July 31, 2010	2	5:00	Kabukicho, Tokyo, Japan	Jewels Lightweight Queen tournament opening round
Win	2-0	Rina Tomita	Decision (3-0)	Deep: clubDeep Toyama: Barbarian Festival 8	May 16, 2010	2	5:00	Toyama, Toyama Prefecture, Japan	
Win	1-0	Yuko Kagoshima	Technical Submission (armbar)	Jewels 7th ring	March 19, 2010	2	4:35	Kabukicho, Tokyo, Japan	

== Kickboxing record ==
Professional record
1 Fight, 1 Win, 0 Losses, 0 Draws
Result	Record	Opponent	Method	Event	Date	Round	Time	Location	Notes
Win	1-0-0	(Japan) Yoshimi Ohama	Decision (3-0)	Jewels 10th Ring	October 10, 2010	3	2:00	Koto, Tokyo, Japan	Shoot boxing rules

Legend: Win Loss Draw/No contest

== See also ==
- List of female mixed martial artists
- List of female kickboxers
