= Yoko Takahashi (fighter) =

Japanese professional wrestler and mixed martial artist (born 1973)

- Born: 20 April 1973 (age 53); Otaru, Hokkaido, Japan
- Other names: Taka
- Height: 172 cm (5 ft 8 in)
- Weight: 72 kg (159 lb; 11 st 5 lb)
- Style: Kickboxing, Boxing
- Team: AJW (1996–1997); Jd' (1997–2001); Miharu cram school (2002); SOD Women's MMA Dojo (2003–2006); Freelance (2006, 2007, 2008); Tomoe-gumi (2007–2008); Age Age (2008–2010); Fight Chix (2010)
- Years active: 1996–2010 (MMA); 1996-1999, 2010 (kickboxing); 2006 (boxing)

Professional boxing record
- Total: 1
- Losses: 1
- By knockout: 1

Kickboxing record
- Total: 7
- Wins: 2
- By knockout: 1
- Losses: 4
- By knockout: 1
- Draws: 1

Mixed martial arts record
- Total: 29
- Wins: 15
- By knockout: 4
- By submission: 11
- Losses: 12
- By knockout: 2
- By submission: 5
- By decision: 4
- By disqualification: 1
- Draws: 2

Other information
- Website: Official blog
- Boxing record from BoxRec
- Mixed martial arts record from Sherdog
- Last updated on: December 13, 2010

Yoko Takahashi (高橋 洋子, Takahashi Yōko; born on 20 April 1973) is a Japanese female mixed martial arts (MMA) fighter and kickboxer and former boxer and professional wrestler. Takahashi is a former Smackgirl open weight champion. She is considered Japan's first female mixed martial artist.

== Background ==
Takahashi was born on 20 April 1973 in Otaru, Hokkaido, Japan.

== Professional wrestling career ==
Takahashi debuted as a professional wrestler with All Japan Women's Pro-Wrestling (AJW) promotion in 1994 and kept participating until the end of 1996, when she decided not to continue with professional wrestling due to a hernia in her back. She became a part-time referee for promotion Yoshimoto Pro-Wrestling Jd', where she met her long-time partner Megumi Yabushita. They both left Jd' in 2002.

== Mixed martial arts career ==
Takahashi debuted in MMA on July 14, 1996 at AJW event U Top Tournament: Participants Selection Matches (U★TOPトーナメント出場者選考試合, u top tōnamento shutsujōsha senkō shiai) held at Korakuen Hall, in a fight that consisted of a single round with unlimited time, defeating German pro-wrestler Thundercrackk from Pro Wrestling Fujiwara Gumi at 10 minutes and 14 seconds, after Takahashi landed a kick to the face that made Thundercrackk give up.

At Nippon Budokan on 12 August 1996 at the event U Top Tournament: First Round (U★TOPトーナメント１回戦, u top tōnamento 1 kaisen), Takahashi suffered her first loss, being defeated by Russian judoka Irina Rodina with a submission at 6 minutes and 6 seconds of the single no time limit round.

At the event The U-Japan Super Fighting '96 vol. 1 held on 17 November 1996 at the Ariake Coliseum, Takahashi was defeated by American women's MMA pioneer Becky Levi via TKO (corner stoppage, towel thrown in, punches) at 2 minutes and 13 seconds of the unlimited time bout.

Takahashi was defeated by karateka Miwako Ishihara via unanimous decision after two rounds at Daido Juku's event Daido Juku: The Wars 4 (大道塾・THE WARS 4, daidō juku the wars 4) on March 11, 1997 at the Korakuen Hall.

At the event Jd' MMA Professional-Amateur Showdown (Jd' 格闘技プロ・アマ対決, jd' kakutougi puro ama taiketsu) on October 12, 1997 Takahashi defeated Yuko Mukai via unanimous decision after 3 rounds.

On December 8, 1997 at the event Central Martial Arts Association: Octagon Challenge held at the Nagoya Congress Center, Takahashi lost against pro-wrestler Rieko Amano (known by the ring name Carlos Amano) after Takahashi illegally kicked Amano in the face and was disqualified at 17 minutes and 25 seconds.

Takahashi next fought and defeated partner Megumi Yabushita at 16 minutes with 7 seconds of an unlimited time match with a heel hold submission on March 8, 1998 at Jd' event Yokohama Super Break held at the Yokohama Cultural Gymnasium.

At Ladies Legend Pro-Wrestling (LLPW) event Ultimate Challenge '98 L-1 on October 10, 1998, Takahashi won by TKO (referee stoppage) against kickboxer Aya Mitsui at 1 minute and 54 seconds of the first round.

Takahashi next fought Mari Kaneko, whom Takahashi defeated via submission (achilles lock) at Club Fight Round 1 on November 12, 2000.

Ten days later, on November 22, 2000 Takahashi defeated European Karate Champion Dutch Silviana Furunefield via armbar submission at LLPW event L-1 2000 The Strongest Lady.

At the inaugural Smackgirl event, Smackgirl: Episode 0, held on December 17, 2000 at Korakuen Hall, Takahashi knocked out Dutch kickboxer Sandra de Langeais at 1 minute and 27 seconds of the first round.

On May 3, 2001 at ReMix Golden Gate 2001, Takahashi was defeated by the previous tournament winner, Dutch Marloes Coenen, via submission (armbar) in the first round.

At Club Fight vol. 4 on August 20, 2001, Takahashi fought against Miwako Ishihara once again in a bout that ended in a tie after ten minutes.

Takahashi got another victory when she defeated Mika Harigai by Achilles lock submission in the first round at Smackgirl: Pioneering Spirit on February 3, 2002.

On March 2, 2002 at Zero-One: True Century Creation '02, Takahashi drew with Yuuki Kubota after three rounds.

Takahashi was defeated by Dutch fighter Irma Verhoeff via TKO in the first round on June 23, 2002 at Free Fight Explosion 2, held in Beverwijk, Netherlands.

On July 7, 2002 at Zero-One: Impossible to Escape Takahashi defeated Aya Koyama by submission (guillotine choke) in the first round. Along with a tag match a day before, this was Takahashi only MMA fight with the team Miharu cram school (三晴塾, miharu juku).

After almost two years without MMA fights, at It's Showtime - Amsterdam Arena held on May 20, 2004 in Amsterdam, Takahashi faced once again Irma Verhoeff, who defeated Takahashi, this time by decision. This was Takahashi's first time representing her own team, formed in partnership with adult video maker Soft on Demand (SOD), SOD Women's MMA Dojo.

At Smackgirl 2004: Holy Land Triumphal Return on August 5, 2004 Takahashi defeated masked pro-wrestler Yuiga by TKO after the referee stopped the fight when Yuiga was knocked down with punches for the second time in the last minute of the first round.

On November 4, 2004 at Smackgirl 2004: Yuuki Kondo Retirement Celebration Takahashi defeated pro-wrestler Kaoru Ito with a kimura submission in the first round.

At Smackgirl 2004: World ReMix on December 19, 2004, during the first round of the tournament to determine Smackgirl's first open weight champion, Takahashi had a rematch with Marloes Coenen, who once again defeated Takahashi, this time by TKO (referee stoppage, punches and knees) in the first round.

Takahashi rebounded with a submission victory over American fighter Emma Bush (at the time Emma Nielsen) with a leg armbar in the first round at Smackgirl: Korea 2005 on May 21, 2005.

Debuting in Shooto, Takahashi defeated Mika Hayashi by TKO after knocking Hayashi down for the third time in the first round, winning in 47 seconds at G-Shooto plus 05 on February 24, 2006.

On March 11, 2006 at G-Shooto Japan 04 Takahashi had a third match against Marloes Coenen, who once again defeated Takahashi, submitting her with an armbar in 39 seconds.

At Deep's event CMA festival: Japan vs. South Korea total war held on May 24, 2006, Takahashi defeated South Korean kickboxer Yong Joo Lee with a heel hook submission in the second round.

On June 30, 2006 at Smackgirl 2006: Top Girl Battle Takahashi defeated Michiko Takeda via submission (rear naked choke) in the first round. As her team had recently been disbanded, in this fight Takahashi fought as a freelance with no team.

Takahashi was defeated in her next fight by American Jen Case via armbar submission in the second round at the event Fatal Femmes Fighting: Asian Invasion on February 17, 2007. This was Takahashi's first fight with her new team, Tomoe-gumi (巴組), after she and Megumi Yabushita left their partnership with SOD video maker.

Takahashi became the third Smackgirl open weight title holder by defeating American fighter Alicia Mena by submission (rear naked choke) in the first round at Smackgirl 2007: The Queen Said The USA Is Strongest on May 19, 2007.

At Fatal Femmes Fighting 2: Girls Night Out on July 14, 2007 Takahashi defeated former teammate Keiko Tamai with a calf slicer submission in the first round.

Takahashi lost the Smackgirl open weight title in her first title defense against teammate Hiroko Yamanaka, who defeated Takahashi via unanimous decision after three rounds at Smackgirl 2007: Queens' Hottest Summer on September 6, 2007.

On October 4, 2008 at EliteXC: Heat, Takahashi faced Brazilian Chute Boxe member Cristiane Santos, who defeated Takahashi via unanimous decision after three rounds.

At Cage Fighting Xtreme - XKL Evolution II: Mayhem in Minneapolis on April 24, 2010 American Shana Olsen defeated Takahashi via unanimous decision after three rounds.

=== MMA tag matches ===
During her time with Smackgirl promotion, Takahashi participated in some MMA tag matches. The first of them took place at Smackgirl: Golden Gate 2002 on May 6, 2002 in which Takahashi and her tag partner Tamami Nakamura defeated Hiromi Kanai and Mika Harigai after Kanai fractured some of her ribs when fighting Takahashi and the doctor stopped the fight in the first round.

The second one was at Smackgirl: Strongest Tag Tournament 2002 on July 6, 2002 in which Takahashi was partnered with Hisae Watanabe and both were defeated by Miwako Ishihara and Mari Kaneko when Ishihara caught Takahashi in an armbar and forced her to submit in the first round.

== Kickboxing career ==
On September 10, 1996 in a Groove Match (グローブマッチ, gurōbu macchi) held at Korakuen Hall, Takahshi lost against future shoot boxing champion Fumiko Ishimoto by majority decision after three rounds in a shoot boxing rules fight.

In another Groove Match, Takahashi, representing Jd', defeated Saya Endo, who was representing AJW, by unanimous decision after three rounds on December 8, 1996 at the Ryogoku Kokugikan arena.

On January 16, 1997, Takahashi participated in another Groove Match against an AJW member at the Stadium 2 of the Osaka Prefectural Gymnasium, where she was defeated via unanimous decision after two rounds by Kumiko Maekawa.

At Jd' 3rd Anniversary on April 29, 1999 at the Korakuen Hall, Takahashi participated in a kickboxing match against All Japan Kickboxing Federation (AJKF) fighter Tomomi Sunaba which ended in a draw after 3 rounds.

On September 12, 1999 at the event Jd' Kyoto Tournament (Jd' 京都大会, jd' kyōto taikai), Takahashi defeated Uno by TKO (referee stoppage) in a kickboxing rules match in the first round.

On October 8, 1999 at AJKF event Wave-VIII, Takahashi was defeated by 3-time World Champion kickboxer Naoko Kumagai via unanimous decision after 2 rounds.

Takahashi returned to kickboxing competitions on October 31, 2010 at Dragon Gym event Charity kickboxing event: No Name Heroes 10, where she was defeated via KO in the third round by Muay Thai expert Rie Murakami, barely 10 seconds before the end of the fight.

== Boxing career ==
Takahashi made her boxing debut on June 10, 2006 at the event Yamaki Gym 21st anniversary: Yamaki Festival (山木ジム21周年記念興業 山木祭り, yamaki jimu 21 shūnen kinen kōgyō yamaki matsuri) against Women's International Boxing Association (WIBA) champion Emiko Raika, who defeated Takahashi by KO (body blow) in the fourth round.

== Grappling career ==
At club Deep Tokyo: Megaton Grand Prix 2008 Finals on August 2, 2008 Takahashi had a rematch against Mika Hayashi in a submission grappling match, which ended in a majority draw after two rounds.

== Outside sports ==
In 2002 JD' faced some financial troubles that led to Takahashi and Megumi Yabushita to leave the wrestling promotion to form their own MMA team in partnership with SOD. As part of their partnership with SOD, Takahashi acted as a referee in an adult video where actresses fought naked in the ring.

After some years, Takahashi and Yabushita thought it would be better to work independently and decided to leave the partnership. The SOD Women's MMA Dojo was finally closed on May 31, 2006.

Takahashi and Yabushita later formed a new team, Tomoe-gumi, and they collaborated with Fang Gym in Tokyo in order to have training facilities. Some team members had differences with Fang Gym's policies and this eventually caused the dissolution of the team by November 2007.

After some time as freelancers, in 2008 Yabushita and Takahashi formed a new team, Age Age (アゲ♂アゲ☆), at the request of former Tomoe-gumi fighters. They became bouncers of bar / live house Exit in exchange of using the live house space for their training and amateur MMA shows during the day.

On March 19, 2010 Takahashi, along with Megumi Yabushita, announced their association with American clothing brand Fight Chix and they decided to rename their team to Fight Chix.

Besides MMA, kickboxing and Fight Chix products commercialization, Takahashi currently works in a tuna processing plant and also as a bouncer, alternating with Megumi Yabushita.

== Mixed martial arts record ==
Professional record breakdown
30 matches	15 wins	13 losses
By knockout	5	3
By submission	10	4
By decision	0	4
By disqualification	0	1
Unknown	0	1
Draws	2	

Res.	Record	Opponent	Method	Event	Date	Round	Time	Location	Notes
Loss	15–12–2	Shana Olsen	Decision (unanimous)	CFX - XKL Evolution II: Mayhem in Minneapolis	April 24, 2010	3	5:00	Minneapolis, Minnesota, United States	
Loss	15–11–2	Cris Cyborg	Decision (unanimous)	EliteXC: Heat	October 4, 2008	3	3:00	Sunrise, Florida, United States	
Loss	15–10–2	Hiroko Yamanaka	Decision (unanimous)	Smackgirl 2007: Queens' Hottest Summer	September 6, 2007	3	5:00	Tokyo, Japan	Lost Smackgirl open weight title
Win	15–9–2	Keiko Tamai	Submission (calf slicer)	Fatal Femmes Fighting 2: Girls Night Out	July 14, 2007	1	2:27	Compton, California, United States	
Win	14–9–2	Alicia Mena	Submission (rear naked choke)	Smackgirl 2007: The Queen Said The USA Is Strongest	May 19, 2007	1	3:04	Tokyo, Japan	Won Smackgirl open weight title
Loss	13–9–2	Jen Case	Submission (armbar)	Fatal Femmes Fighting: Asian Invasion	February 17, 2007	2	1:39	Los Angeles, California, United States	
Win	13–8–2	Michiko Takeda	Submission (guillotine choke)	Smackgirl 2006: Top Girl Battle	June 30, 2006	1	4:09	Tokyo, Japan	
Win	12–8–2	Yong Joo Lee	Submission (inverted heel hook)	Deep: CMA Festival	May 24, 2006	2	0:47	Tokyo, Japan	
Loss	11–8–2	Marloes Coenen	Submission (armbar)	G-Shooto: G-Shooto 04	March 11, 2006	1	0:39	Tokyo, Japan	
Win	11–7–2	Mika Hayashi	TKO (head kick)	G-Shooto: Plus05	February 24, 2006	1	0:47	Tokyo, Japan	
Win	10–7–2	Emma Bush	Submission (scarf hold armlock)	Smackgirl: Korea 2005	May 21, 2005	1	4:13	Suwon, South Korea	
Loss	9–7–2	Marloes Coenen	TKO (punches and knees)	Smackgirl 2004: World ReMix	December 19, 2004	1	2:39	Shizuoka, Shizuoka, Japan	Open weight queen decision tournament first round
Win	9–6–2	Kaoru Ito	Submission (kimura)	Smackgirl 2004: Yuuki Kondo Retirement Celebration	November 4, 2004	1	1:34	Tokyo, Japan	
Win	8–6–2	Yukiko Kawakami	TKO (punches)	Smackgirl 2004: Holy Land Triumphal Return	August 5, 2004	1	4:23	Tokyo, Japan	
Loss	7–6–2	Irma Verhoeff	Decision	It's Showtime - Amsterdam Arena	May 20, 2004	1		Amsterdam, Netherlands	
Win	7–5–2	Aya Koyama	Submission (guillotine choke)	Zero-One: Impossible to Escape	July 7, 2002	1	1:43	Tokyo, Japan	
Loss	6–5–2	Irma Verhoeff	TKO (punches)	Free Fight Explosion 2	June 23, 2002	1		Beverwijk, Netherlands	
Draw	6–4–2	Yuuki Kondo	Draw	Zero1 - 1st Anniversary	March 2, 2002	3	3:00	Tokyo, Japan	
Win	6–4–1	Mika Harigai	Submission (Achilles lock)	Smackgirl: Pioneering Spirit	February 3, 2002	1	2:35	Tokyo, Japan	
Draw	5–4–1	Miwako Ishihara	Draw	Club Fight vol. 4	August 20, 2001	1	10:00	Tokyo, Japan	
Loss	5–4	Marloes Coenen	Submission (armbar)	ReMix Golden Gate 2001	May 3, 2001	1	1:11	Tokyo, Japan	
Win	5–3	Sandra de Langeais	TKO (punches)	Smackgirl: Episode 0	December 17, 2000	1	1:27	Tokyo, Japan	
Win	4–3	Silviana Furunefield	Submission (armbar)	LLPW: L-1 2000 The Strongest Lady	November 22, 2000	1	1:28	Tokyo, Japan	
Win	3–3	Mari Kaneko	Submission (Achilles lock)	Club Fight Round 1	November 12, 2000	1	4:01	Tokyo, Japan	
Win	2–3	Aya Mitsui	TKO (punches)	LLPW - Ultimate L-1 Challenge	October 10, 1998	1	1:54	Tokyo, Japan	
Loss	1–3	Rieko Amano	DQ (illegal soccer kick)	CMA: Octagon Challenge	December 8, 1997	1	17:25	Nagoya, Japan	
Loss	1–2	Becky Levi	TKO (submission to punches)	U - Japan	November 17, 1996	1	2:14	Tokyo, Japan	
Loss	1–1	Irina Rodina	Submission (armbar)	U Top Tournament: First Round	August 12, 1996	1	6:06	Tokyo, Japan	
Win	1–0	Kirstie Bragard	TKO (submission to soccer kicks)	AJWPW - U-Top Tournament Qualifiers	July 14, 1996	1	10:14	Tokyo, Japan	

== Kickboxing record ==
Kickboxing record
7 fights 2 wins 4 losses 1 draw
Date	Result	Opponent	Event	Location	Method	Round	Time	Record	Notes
October 31, 2010	Loss	(Japan) Rie Murakami	Charity kickboxing event: No Name Heroes 10	Yuzawa, Akita Prefecture, Japan	TKO (punches)	3	1:50	2–4–1	
October 8, 1999	Loss	(Japan) Naoko Kumagai	AJKF: Wave-VIII	Bunkyo, Tokyo, Japan	Decision (0–3)	2	5:00	2–3–1	
September 12, 1999	Win	(Japan) Uno	Jd' Kyoto Tournament	Kyoto, Kyoto Prefecture, Japan	TKO (referee stoppage)	1	2:34	2–2–1	
April 29, 1999	Draw	(Japan) Tomomi Sunaba	Jd' 3rd Anniversary	Bunkyo, Tokyo, Japan	Draw (1–0)	3	3:00	1–2–1	
January 16, 1997	Loss	(Japan) Kumiko Maekawa		Osaka, Osaka Prefecture, Japan	Decision (0–3)	2	5:00	1–2–0	
December 8, 1996	Win	(Japan) Saya Endo		Sumida, Tokyo, Japan	Decision (3–0)	3	3:00	1–1–0	
September 10, 1996	Loss	(Japan) Fumiko Ishimoto		Bunkyo, Tokyo, Japan	Decision (0–2)	3	3:00	0–1–0	Shoot boxing rules
Legend: Win Loss Draw/No contest

== Professional boxing record ==
0 Wins (0 knockouts), 1 Loss, 0 Draws

Result	Record	Opponent	Method	Date	Round	Time	Location	Notes
Loss	0–1	(Japan) Emiko Raika	KO (body blow)	June 10, 2006	4	1:30	Kabukicho, Tokyo, Japan	

== Grappling record ==
Grappling record
1 fight 0 wins 0 losses 1 draw
Date	Result	Opponent	Event	Location	Method	Round	Time	Record
August 2, 2008	Draw	(Japan) Mika Hayashi	club Deep Tokyo: Megaton Grand Prix 2008 Finals	Kabukicho, Tokyo, Japan	Decision (0–1)	2	5:00	16–11–3
Legend: Win Loss Draw/No contest

== Championships and accomplishments ==
- Smackgirl open weight champion

== See also ==
- List of female mixed martial artists
- List of female kickboxers
- List of female boxers
