= List of female mixed martial artists =

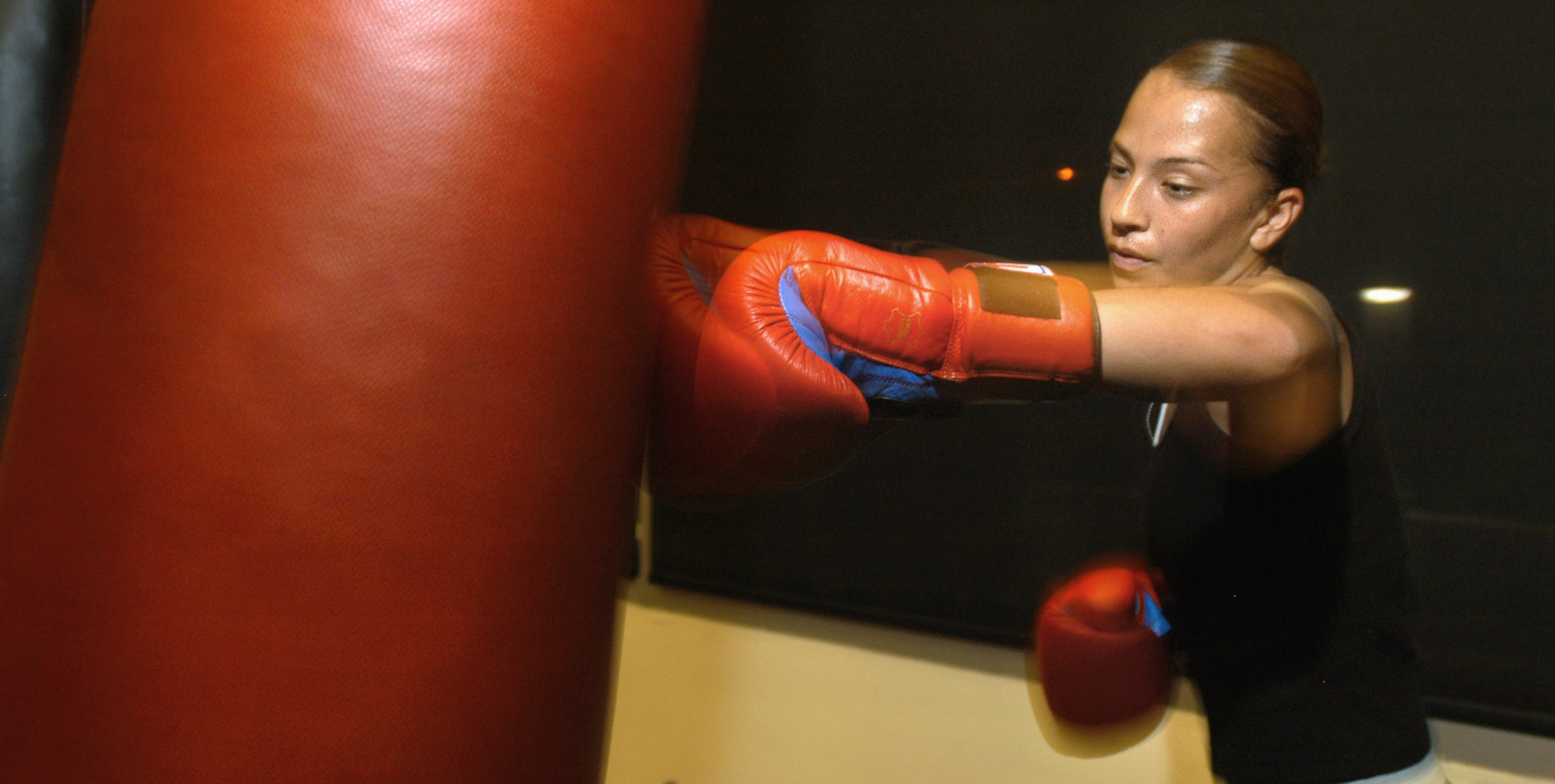
MMA competition requires training in striking, wrestling and submission fighting.

This is a list of notable female mixed martial arts fighters in alphabetical order.

== A ==
- (Kazakhstan) Mariya Agapova (UFC, Invicta)
- (Mexico) Jessica Aguilar (UFC, Bellator, WSOF)
- (Japan) Hitomi Akano (M-1, Strikeforce, Pancrase, JEWELS, Smackgirl, Invicta)
- (Russia) Aleksandra Albu (UFC)
- (Mexico) Irene Aldana (UFC, Invicta)
- (United States) JJ Aldrich (UFC, Invicta)
- (Brazil) Talita Alencar (UFC)
- (United States) Lynn Alvarez (Invicta, Bellator)
- (Japan) Reiko Amano
- (United States) Alyse Anderson (OneFC)
- (Australia) Megan Anderson (Invicta, UFC)
- (Brazil) Jessica Andrade (UFC)
- (United States) Nina Ansaroff (UFC, Invicta)
- (Brazil) Viviane Araújo (UFC)
- (Japan) Kanna Asakura (Rizin, Bellator, DEEP, Shooto, Pancrase)
- (United States) Glena Avila
- (United States) Julia Avila (UFC, Invicta)
- (Russia) Diana Avsaragova (Bellator)

== B ==
- (Netherlands) Jorina Baars (OneFC)
- (United States) Maycee Barber (UFC, Legacy)
- (United States) Shayna Baszler (EliteXC, ShoXC, Strikeforce, Invicta, UFC)
- (Romania) Diana Belbiţă (UFC)
- (United States) Amanda Bell (Invicta, Bellator)
- (United States) DeAnna Bennett (Invicta, UFC)
- (Russia) Julia Berezikova (M-1, SFL)
- (Brazil) Talita Bernardo (Invicta)
- (France) Lucie Bertaud (Bellator, Titan FC)
- (Netherlands) Jemyma Betrian
- (United States) Erin Blanchfield (UFC, Invicta)
- (Australia) Arlene Blencowe (Bellator)
- (Thailand) Suwanan Boonsorn (DEEP, Rizin)
- (Italy) Mara Romero Borella (UFC, Invicta)
- (Brazil) Poliana Botelho (XFC, UFC)
- (United States) Amber Brown (Invicta, KOTC, Pancrase)
- (United States) Amanda Brundage (UFC, Invicta, KOTC)
- (Italy) Annalisa Bucci (KOTC, Bellator)
- (Germany) Alexandra Buch (JEWELS)
- (Canada) Julia Budd (Bellator, Invicta, Strikeforce)

== C ==
- (Brazil) Priscila Cachoeira (UFC)
- (Scotland) Joanne Calderwood (UFC, Invicta, CWFC, SFL)
- (United States) Cynthia Calvillo (UFC, LFA)
- (United States) Gina Carano (EliteXC, Strikeforce)
- (United States) Liz Carmouche (UFC, Strikeforce, Invicta, Bellator)
- (Brazil) Ariane Carnelossi (UFC)
- (Brazil) Luana Carolina (UFC)
- (United States) Cortney Casey (UFC, XFC)
- (Brazil) Jacqueline Cavalcanti (UFC, LFA, PFL)
- (Australia) Alex Chambers (JEWELS, Invicta, UFC)
- (United States) Chelsea Chandler (UFC)
- (United States) Macy Chiasson (UFC)
- (Federated States of Micronesia) Jennifer Chieng (Bellator, Invicta)
- (Slovakia) Monika Chochlikova (Bellator)
- (United States) Katlyn Chookagian (UFC, CFFC)
- (United States) Hannah Cifers (UFC)
- (Austria) Jasminka Cive (KSW, Invicta)
- (United States) Heather Clark (UFC, Bellator, XFC)
- (Netherlands) Marloes Coenen (DREAM, Strikeforce, Invicta, Smackgirl, Shooto, Bellator)
- (Australia) Sara Collins (Bellator)
- (Guatemala) Mayra Conde (Smackgirl)
- (United States) Alexa Conners (Invicta)
- (United States) Amanda Cooper (UFC, Invicta)
- (France) Nora Cornolle (UFC)
- (Brazil) Bethe Correia (Jungle Fight, UFC)
- (United States) Tracy Cortez (Invicta, UFC)
- (United States) Kim Couture (Strikeforce, XFC)
- (United States) Ashley Cummins (Invicta)
- (United States) Kailin Curran (UFC)
- (Brazil) Cris Cyborg (EliteXC, Strikeforce, Invicta, UFC, Bellator)
- (Poland) Wiktoria Czyżewska (KSW)

== D ==
- (Brazil) Ariane da Silva (UFC, KSW)
- (United States) Sarah D'Alelio (Invicta, BAMMA USA, Pancrase)
- (Republic of Ireland) Aisling Daly (Invicta, Bellator, Cage Rage, CWFC, UFC)
- (Belgium) Cindy Dandois (UFC, Invicta, Rizin FF, PFL)
- (Iceland) Sunna Davíðsdóttir (Invicta)
- (Canada) Alexis Davis (UFC, Strikeforce, Invicta)
- (Brazil) Gloria de Paula (UFC, Invicta, LFA)
- (United States) Jillian DeCoursey (Invicta)
- (Brazil) Jéssica Delboni (Invicta)
- (United States) Vanessa Demopoulos (UFC)
- (United States) Mackenzie Dern (Legacy, UFC)
- (Italy) Micol Di Segni (CWFC)
- (England) Dakota Ditcheva (PFL)
- (United States) Shana Dobson (UFC)
- (Germany) Julia Dorny (IMMAF)
- (United States) Emily Ducote (Bellator, Invicta)
- (Russia) Milana Dudieva (UFC, Invicta)
- (New Zealand) Faith Van Duin (Invicta)
- (United States) Jessamyn Duke (UFC, Invicta)
- (Brazil) Norma Dumont (UFC)

== E ==
- (Brazil) Maria Eduarda (LFA)
- (Panama) Joselyne Edwards (UFC)
- (Switzerland) Stephanie Egger (UFC)
- (United States) Stephanie Eggink (Invicta, XFC)
- (United States) Lisa Ellis (Smackgirl, Invicta, Bellator, DEEP, UFC)
- (Mexico) Kenia Enríquez (Combate Global)
- (Mongolia) Bolormaa "Esui" Erdenebileg (JEWELS)
- (United States) Carla Esparza (UFC, Invicta, Bellator, XFC)
- (United States) Jodie Esquibel (Invicta, UFC)
- (United States) Sijara Eubanks (UFC, Invicta)
- (United States) Ashlee Evans-Smith (UFC, WSOF)
- (United States) Tonya Evinger (EliteXC, ShoXC, Invicta, Titan FC, UFC)
- (United States) Jessica Eye (UFC, Bellator)

== F ==
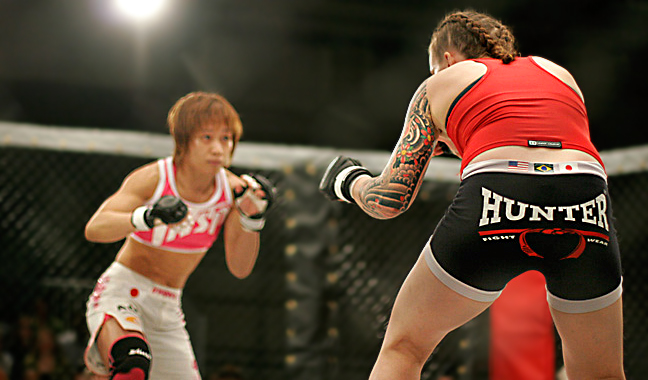
Fujii (left) vs. Cody Welchlin (right)

- (New Zealand) Genah Fabian (PFL)
- (Hungary) Melinda Fabian (UFC)
- (Brazil) Zarah Fairn (UFC, BAMMA)
- (Thailand) Stamp Fairtex (One FC)
- (Brazil) Kalindra Faria (UFC)
- (United States) Kelly Faszholz (UFC, Invicta)
- (United States) Christine Ferea (Invicta)
- (Brazil) Elisandra Ferreira (Invicta)
- (United States) Jan Finney (Strikeforce, ShoXC, KOTC, PFC)
- (France) Manon Fiorot (UFC)
- (United States) Brianna Fortino (UFC, Invicta)
- (United States) Stephanie Frausto (Bellator, Invicta, TPF)
- (United States) Jinh Yu Frey (UFC, Invicta, Rizin FF, Road FC)
- (Germany) Ania Fucz
- (Japan) Megumi Fujii (Sengoku, Bellator, JEWELS, Shooto, Smackgirl, VTJ)
- (Japan) Emi Fujino (Sengoku, JEWELS, Smackgirl, WSOF)

== G ==
- (Brazil) Cláudia Gadelha (UFC, Invicta)
- (Germany) Sheila Gaff (M-1, CWFC, UFC, XFC-i)
- (Indonesia) Priscilla Hertati Lumban Gaol (One FC)
- (Brazil) Gabi Garcia (Rizin FF)
- (Brazil) Melissa Gatto (UFC)
- (United States) Stephanie Geltmacher (Invicta, Bellator)
- (Mexico) Loopy Godínez (LFA, UFC)
- (United States) Hannah Goldy (UFC)
- (Brazil) Denise Gomes (UFC)
- (Brazil) Ediane Gomes (KOTC, Invicta)
- (United States) Pearl Gonzalez (UFC, Invicta)
- (Russia) Svetlana Goundarenko
- (United States) Miranda Granger (UFC, Cage Fury)
- (Mexico) Alexa Grasso (UFC, Invicta)
- (United States) Alida Gray (WSOF, Invicta)
- (Finland) Minna Grusander (Invicta)
- (Poland) Laura Grzyb (KSW)
- (United States) Zoila Frausto Gurgel (Invicta, Bellator, Strikeforce, TPF, RFA)

== H ==
- (Australia) Chelsea Hackett (PFL)
- (Luxembourg) Claire Haigh
- (South Korea) Seo Hee Ham (UFC, Smackgirl, DEEP, JEWELS, Road FC, One)
- (Japan) Ayaka Hamasaki (JEWELS, Rizin, Invicta, Shooto)
- (United States) Kay Hansen (UFC, Invicta)
- (New Zealand) Janay Harding (Bellator)
- (United States) Heather Hardy (Bellator)
- (Venezuela) Veronica Hardy (UFC)
- (United States) Kayla Harrison (PFL)
- (Japan) Takayo Hashi (Smackgirl, JEWELS, Strikeforce, Invicta)
- (United States) Felice Herrig (UFC, Bellator, XFC)
- (United States) Angela Hill (UFC, Invicta)
- (Japan) Itsuki Hirata (One)
- (United States) Munah Holland (Bellator, Invicta)
- (United States) Holly Holm (Bellator, Legacy, UFC)
- (United States) Barb Honchak (Invicta, KOTC, UFC)
- (Japan) Ikuma Hoshino (Smackgirl, Shooto)
- (Japan) Yumiko Hotta (DEEP, VTJ)
- (United States) Sam Hughes (UFC)

== I ==
- (Russia) Daria Ibragimova (Invicta)
- (Japan) Mai Ichii (DEEP, JEWELS, Smackgirl)
- (United States) Sumiko Inaba (Bellator)
- (Japan) Mizuki Inoue (JEWELS, DEEP, Invicta)
- (Japan) Kikuyo Ishikawa (JEWELS, Pancrase)
- (Japan) Saori Ishioka (Smackgirl, JEWELS, Pancrase, DEEP)
- (Japan) Seika Izawa (Rizin, DEEP)

== J ==
- (England) Kate Jackson (Bellator, Cage Warriors)
- (United States) Sharon Jacobson (Invicta)
- (Brazil) Virna Jandiroba (UFC, Invicta)
- Yazmin Jauregui (Combate Global, UWC Mexico, UFC)
- (Poland) Joanna Jędrzejczyk (UFC, CWFC)
- (United States) Adrienna Jenkins (WEC, HOOKnSHOOT, Bellator)
- (Georgia (country)) Liana Jojua (UFC, Kunlun)
- (United States) Jocelyn Jones-Lybarger (UFC, Invicta, RFA, KOTC)
- (Argentina) Silvana Gómez Juárez (UFC, KSW, XFC, Budo SC)
- (United States) Ana Julaton (OneFC, Bellator)

== K ==
- (United States) Emily Kagan (UFC, Invicta)
- (Greece) Elina Kallionidou (Bellator)
- (Japan) Mari Kaneko (Smackgirl, JEWELS, DEEP)
- (Finland) Katja Kankaanpää (CWFC, Invicta)
- (Pakistan) Anita Karim (OneFC)
- (Australia) Nadia Kassem (UFC)
- (Canada) Sarah Kaufman (Invicta, KOTC, PFC, Strikeforce, UFC)
- (Republic of Ireland) Sinead Kavanagh (Bellator)
- (Japan) Namiko Kawabata (DEEP)
- (United States) Julie Kedzie (KOTC, ShoXC, Strikeforce, EliteXC, UFC)
- (Scotland) Amanda Kelly (CWFC)
- (Sweden) Pannie Kianzad (UFC, CWFC, Invicta)
- (Netherlands) Denise Kielholtz (Bellator)
- (South Korea) Ji Yeon Kim (UFC)
- (Japan) Kyoko Kimura (Pancrase)
- (United States) Justine Kish (RFA, UFC)
- (United States) Ava Knight (Bellator)
- (Sweden) Josefine Knutsson (UFC)
- (Japan) Asami Kodera (Smackgirl, JEWELS)
- (Ukraine) Olena Kolesnyk (Bellator)
- (Japan) Syuri Kondo (UFC)
- (Japan) Yuuki Kondo (Smackgirl)
- (Poland) Karolina Kowalkiewicz (UFC, Invicta, KSW)
- (Japan) Rena Kubota (JEWELS, Rizin FF)
- (Russia) Yana Kunitskaya (Invicta, UFC)
- (Japan) Mina Kurobe (JEWELS, Shooto)
- (Russia) Natalia Kuziutina (LFA, Invicta, Titan FC)

== L ==
- (United States) Aspen Ladd (Invicta, UFC)
- (Sweden) Lina Länsberg (UFC)
- (Colombia) Alejandra Lara (Bellator, Budo SC)
- (United States) Tara LaRosa (Invicta, Smackgirl)
- (United States) Andrea Lee (Invicta, LFA, UFC)
- (Singapore) Angela Lee (ONE)
- (Singapore) Victoria Lee (†) (ONE)
- (Germany) Katharina Lehner (Invicta, Bellator)
- (United States) Amber Leibrock (Invicta, Bellator)
- (Brazil) Amanda Lemos (UFC)
- (United States) Victoria Leonardo (UFC)
- (Canada) Valérie Létourneau (UFC, Bellator)
- (United States) Leah Letson (UFC, Invicta, KOTC)
- (United States) Becky Levi (DEEP)
- (South Korea) Su Jeong Lim
- (Brazil) Juliana Lima (UFC, Invicta)
- (United States) Jenny Liou (Invicta, KOTC)
- (Thailand) Loma Lookboonmee (UFC, Invicta)
- (United States) Valerie Loureda (Bellator)
- (United States) Amanda Lucas (DEEP)
- (Brazil) Iasmin Lucindo (UFC)

== M ==
- (Venezuela) Veronica Macedo (UFC)
- (United States) Pauline Macias (LFA)
- (United States) Ilima-Lei Macfarlane (Bellator)
- (Brazil) Valesca Machado (Invicta)
- (Japan) Tomo Maesawa (JEWELS, Rizin)
- (United States) Angela Magaña (UFC)
- (Brazil) Jennifer Maia (Invicta, Cage Warriors, UFC)
- (Sweden) Bea Malecki (UFC)
- (Canada) Randa Markos (RFA, UFC)
- (England) Savannah Marshall (PFL)
- (United States) Mallory Martin (UFC, Invicta, LFA, Kunlun)
- (Japan) Miku Matsumoto (DEEP, Smackgirl, Shooto)
- (United States) Miranda Maverick (Invicta, UFC)
- (United States) Elaina Maxwell (Strikeforce)
- (United States) Gina Mazany (UFC)
- (Colombia) Sabina Mazo (UFC)
- (United Kingdom) Molly McCann (UFC, Cage Warriors)
- (United States) Liz McCarthy (Invicta)
- (Republic of Ireland) Danni McCormack (Bellator, Invicta)
- (Northern Ireland) Leah McCourt (Bellator, Cage Warriors)
- (Wales) Cory McKenna (UFC)
- (United States) Sara McMann (Titan FC, Invicta, UFC)
- (Brazil) Kaline Medeiros (Bellator, Invicta)
- (Brazil) Vanessa Melo (UFC)
- (Brazil) Jady Menezes (UAE Warriors)
- (Brazil) Beatriz Mesquita (UFC, LFA)
- (United States) Jessy Miele (Bellator)
- (United States) Randi Miller (Invicta)
- (Japan) Reina Miura (DEEP, Rizin)
- (United States) Roxanne Modafferi (KOTC, Strikeforce, Cage Warriors, Shooto, Smackgirl, JEWELS, Invicta, UFC)
- (Japan) Yasuko Mogi (Shooto, Smackgirl, JEWELS)
- (Russia) Marina Mokhnatkina (Fight Nights Global, Bellator)
- (United States) Nicco Montaño (UFC, KOTC)
- (United States) Amy Montenegro (Invicta, KOTC)
- (Brazil) Mariana Morais (KSW, Invicta, PFL)
- (Brazil) Janaisa Morandin (Invicta)
- (Canada) Sarah Moras (UFC, Invicta, CWFC)
- (United States) Peggy Morgan (Invicta, UFC)
- (Ukraine) Maryna Moroz (UFC, XFC-i)
- (Japan) Miki Motono (DEEP)
- (United States) Jamie Moyle (UFC, Invicta)
- (United States) Lauren Mueller (UFC)
- (Japan) Kanako Murata (UFC)
- (United States) Lauren Murphy (UFC, Invicta)
- (Australia) Serin Murray (Smackgirl)

== N ==
- (Japan) Mika Nagano (Smackgirl, JEWELS, DEEP)
- (Philippines) Jujeath Nagaowa (OneFC)
- (Japan) Rin Nakai (DEEP, UFC, Pancrase, Rizin, Smackgirl)
- (United States) Miriam Nakamoto (Invicta)
- (United States) Rose Namajunas (UFC, Invicta)
- (Brazil) Michelle Nicolini (OneFC)
- (Poland) Agnieszka Niedźwiedź (Invicta, Cage Warriors)
- (Brazil) Talita Nogueira (Bellator)
- (Japan) Sakura Nomura (JEWELS)
- (Brazil) Amanda Nunes (Invicta, Strikeforce, UFC)
- (Brazil) Josiane Nunes (UFC)
- (United States) Nina Nunes (UFC, Invicta)

== O ==
- (Scotland) Casey O'Neill (UFC)
- (Japan) Saori Oshima (Shooto, Jewels)
- (Malaysia) Ann Osman (OneFC)
- (United States) Rachael Ostovich (Bellator, UFC, Invicta)
- (Ukraine) Lena Ovchynnikova (Bellator, SFL)
- (Netherlands) Hatice Ozyurt (Bellator, BAMMA)

== P ==
- (United States) Raquel Pa'aluhi (Invicta)
- (Brazil) Larissa Pacheco (PFL, UFC)
- (South Korea) Si Woo Park (Road FC, Jewels)
- (United States) Julianna Peña (UFC)
- (United States) Jessica Penne (Invicta, Bellator, UFC)
- (United States) Raquel Pennington (Invicta, UFC)
- (United States) Tecia Pennington (UFC, Invicta)
- (Dominican Republic) Helen Peralta (Invicta, Cage Fury, PFL, LFA)
- (Brazil) Aline Pereira (LFA)
- (Brazil) Viviane Pereira (XFC-i, UFC)
- (Argentina) Ailín Pérez (UFC)
- (United States) Elizabeth Phillips (UFC, Invicta)
- (India) Ritu Phogat (OneFC)
- (Brazil) Luana Pinheiro (UFC)
- (Brazil) Vanessa Porto (Invicta, Jungle Fight, Bellator)
- (Brazil) Lara Procópio (UFC, Shooto)
- (Czech Republic) Lucie Pudilova (UFC)
- (United States) Debi Purcell (KOTC, ShoXC, Smackgirl)

== R ==
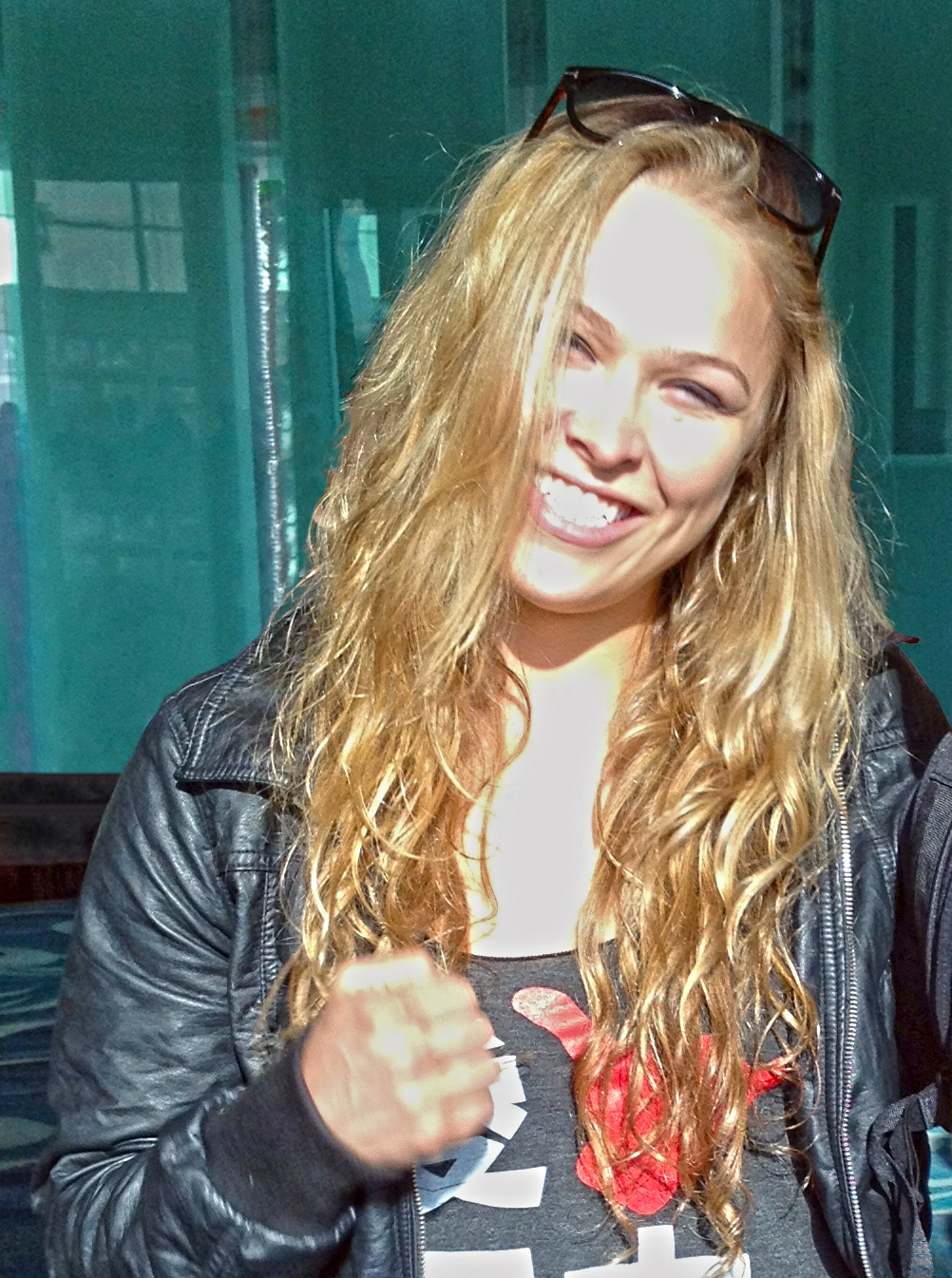
Former UFC Women's Bantamweight Champion and former Raw Women's Champion Ronda Rousey

- (Japan) Emiko Raika (Pancrase, Shooto, DEEP)
- (Canada) Jessica Rakoczy (Bellator, TPF, UFC)
- (Netherlands) Germaine de Randamie (UFC, Strikeforce)
- (Ukraine) Alyona Rassohyna (OneFC)
- (Australia) Bec Rawlings (UFC, Invicta)
- (United States) Elise Reed (UFC)
- (United States) Elena Reid (Bellator)
- (United States) Marion Reneau (UFC, TPF)
- (Brazil) Amanda Ribas (UFC)
- (Brazil) Tabatha Ricci (UFC)
- (United States) Shaianna Rincon (Invicta)
- (United States) Nicdali Rivera-Calanoc (Invicta)
- (Canada) Gillian Robertson (UFC)
- (Russia) Irina Rodina
- (United States) Cassie Rodish (Invicta)
- (Mexico) Karina Rodríguez (Invicta)
- (Brazil) Marina Rodriguez (UFC)
- (Brazil) Karol Rosa (UFC)
- (United States) Montana De La Rosa (UFC, Legacy)
- (Australia) Jessica Rose-Clark (UFC, Invicta, Titan)
- (United States) Ronda Rousey (KOTC, UFC, Strikeforce)
- (Israel) Olga Rubin (Invicta)
- (Mexico) Montserrat Ruiz (UFC, Invicta)

== S ==
- (Egypt) Aya Saeid Saber (OneFC, Kunlun)
- (Japan) Sumie Sakai
- (Cambodia) Tharoth Sam (OneFC)
- (United States) Laura Sanko (Invicta)
- (United States) Rayanne dos Santos (Invicta)
- (Brazil) Taila Santos (PFL, UFC)
- (Brazil) Yana Santos (UFC)
- (Japan) Chihiro Sawada (OneFC)
- (United States) Colleen Schneider (Strikeforce, SFL)
- (United States) Sarah Schneider (Invicta, PFC)
- (United States) Lacey Schuckman (Strikeforce, Invicta, Cage Warriors)
- (Turkey) Sabriye Şengül (Bellator)
- (Puerto Rico) Amanda Serrano
- (England) Rosi Sexton (Bellator, ShoXC, UFC, CWFC)
- (Moldova) Marina Shafir (Invicta)
- (Kyrgyzstan) Antonina Shevchenko (UFC)
- (Kyrgyzstan) Valentina Shevchenko (UFC, Legacy)
- (United States) Claressa Shields (PFL)
- (Japan) Satoko Shinashi (Shooto, Smackgirl, DEEP, RoadFC)
- (Japan) Sayaka Shioda (Pancrase)
- (Brazil) Dayana Silva (Bellator)
- (Brazil) Karine Silva (UFC)
- (Brazil) Mayra Bueno Silva (UFC)
- (Brazil) Natália Silva (UFC)
- (United States) Tessa Simpson (Invicta)
- (United States) Shannon Sinn (LFA, Invicta)
- (United States) Leslie Smith (Invicta, Bellator, UFC)
- (United States) Tiffany van Soest (Invicta)
- (United States) Pam Sorenson (Invicta, KOTC)
- (Czech Republic) Simona Soukupova (Invicta)
- (Brazil) Ketlen Souza (Invicta, UFC)
- (Brazil) Livia Renata Souza (Invicta, UFC)
- (United States) Lisa Spangler (Invicta)
- (Canada) Felicia Spencer (Invicta, UFC)
- (United States) Christine Stanley (Invicta)
- (Lithuania) Julija Stoliarenko (UFC, Invicta)
- (United States) Tatiana Suarez (UFC)
- (Japan) Moeri Suda (DEEP, Rizin)
- (Japan) Naho Sugiyama (Invicta, JEWELS)
- (Japan) Shizuka Sugiyama (JEWELS, DEEP, Rizin)
- (Sweden) Smilla Sundell (UFC)
- (Slovakia) Lucia Szabová (UFC)

== T ==
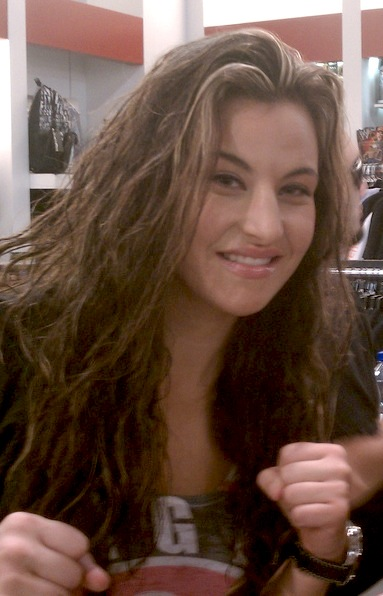
Former UFC Women's Bantamweight Champion Miesha Tate

- (Thailand) Chommanee Sor Taehiran
- (Japan) Yoko Takahashi (EliteXC, Smackgirl)
- (Japan) Satomi Takano (ONE, Rizin, DEEP, Shooto, Pancrase, JEWELS)
- (Japan) Yasuko Tamada (JEWELS, Shooto, Smackgirl, DEEP, Invicta)
- (Japan) Keiko Tamai (Smackgirl, ShoXC)
- (United States) Lei'D Tapa (Rizin)
- (United States) Jennifer Tate (ShoXC)
- (United States) Miesha Tate (UFC, Strikeforce)
- (United States) Danielle Taylor (UFC, KOTC)
- (United States) Lauren Taylor (UFC, Invicta, Legacy)
- (United States) Taneisha Tennant (Invicta)
- (Brazil) Herica Tiburcio (Invicta)
- (India) Jeet Toshi (OneFC)
- (United States) Erin Toughill (Smackgirl, PFC)
- (Mongolia) Naranjargal Tsend-Ayush (LFA, PFL)
- (Japan) Yuka Tsuji (Smackgirl, JEWELS, DEEP)
- (Canada) Charmaine Tweet (Invicta)

== V ==
- (Italy) Jleana Valentino (Rizin, Brave CF)
- (Japan) Shino VanHoose (Invicta, Pancrase)
- (United States) Lindsey VanZandt (Bellator, Invicta, KOTC)
- (United States) Paige VanZant (UFC, Invicta)
- (Brazil) Juliana Velasquez (PFL)
- (Brazil) Polyana Viana (UFC)
- (Brazil) Ketlen Vieira (UFC)
- (United States) Cheyanne Vlismas (UFC)

== W ==
- (Guam) Brogan Walker (UFC. Invicta)
- (United States) Shelby Walker (†) (HOOKnSHOOT)
- (China) Cong Wang (UFC)
- (Japan) Ayaka Watanabe (JEWELS, Pancrase, Shooto)
- (Japan) Kana Watanabe (PFL)
- (United States) Michelle Waterson-Gomez (UFC, Invicta, Strikeforce, KOTC)
- (United States) Emily Whitmire (UFC)
- (Poland) Paulina Wiśniewska (PFL)
- (United States) Danyelle Wolf (UFC)
- (Scotland) Joanne Wood (UFC)
- (China) Wu Yanan (UFC, Kunlun)

== X ==
- (China) Xiong Jingnan (OneFC, Kunlun)

== Y ==
- (Japan) Megumi Yabushita (Smackgirl, JEWELS, Pancrase, Shooto)
- (Japan) Yoko Yamada (Smackgirl, JEWELS)
- (Japan) Mei Yamaguchi (Smackgirl, JEWELS, VTJ, DEEP, OneFC)
- (Japan) Miyuu Yamamoto (Rizin)
- (Japan) Hiroko Yamanaka (Smackgirl, JEWELS, Invicta, Strikeforce)
- (China) Yan Xiaonan (UFC, Road FC)
- (Brazil) Duda Yankovich (Invicta)
- (United States) Ashley Yoder (Invicta, UFC)
- (United States) Kaitlin Young (Invicta, EliteXC)
- (United States) Shanna Young (Invicta, UFC)

== Z ==
- (United States) Alesha Zappitella (Invicta)
- (China) Weili Zhang (UFC, Kunlun)
- (United States) Cat Zingano (Invicta, UFC)

== See also ==
- List of male mixed martial artists
- List of undefeated mixed martial artists
- List of female boxers
- List of female kickboxers
- Ultimate Fighting Championship Pound for Pound rankings
