= Mari Kaneko =

Japanese karateka and MMA fighter

- Born: June 24, 1972 (age 54); Suwa, Nagano Prefecture, Japan
- Nationality: Japanese
- Height: 1.50 m (4 ft 11 in)
- Weight: 54 kg (119 lb)
- Division: Flyweight
- Style: Karate
- Fighting out of: Anan, Tokushima Prefecture, Japan
- Team: Zendokai Anan
- Years active: 2000-present

Mixed martial arts record
- Total: 19
- Wins: 10
- By submission: 7
- By decision: 3
- Losses: 8
- By knockout: 1
- By submission: 2
- By decision: 5
- Draws: 1

Other information
- Mixed martial arts record from Sherdog
- Last updated on: December 24, 2010

Mari Kaneko (金子 真理, Kaneko Mari; born on June 24, 1972) is a Japanese female karateka and mixed martial arts (MMA) fighter. Kaneko has competed for MMA promotions Ax, Smackgirl, Deep and Jewels.

== Background ==
Kaneko was born on June 24, 1972 in Suwa, Nagano Prefecture, Japan.

== Martial arts training ==
In 1999, Kaneko won the All-Japan Amateur Shooto Championships in the women's flyweight and also the bantamweight divisions of East Japan. In 2000, she conquered the Central Japan Amateur Shooto Championships in the featherweight division.

In 1999 Kaneko was the runner-up in the Real Fighting Karate-do Championships, repeating this feat in 2000.

From 2001 to 2003 she won the Real Fighting Karate-do Championships and was the runner up in 2004.

In 2009 and 2010 Kaneko was the runner up of the All-Japan Real Fighting Karate Championships -52 kg, being defeated in the final both times by Saori Ishioka.

== Mixed martial arts career ==
Kaneko made her MMA debut on November 12, 2000 at Club Fight Round 1 where she was defeated by Japanese women's MMA pioneer Yoko Takahashi via submission (achilles lock).

At Smackgirl: Episode 0 on December 17, 2000, Kaneko defeated Miwako Ishihara in 36 seconds with an armbar submission.

Kaneko got her second submission loss against Ikuma Hoshino, who defeated Kaneko with a guillotine choke on July 26, 2001 at Smackgirl: Indeed.

At Smackgirl: Burning Night on August 23, 2001 Kaneko defeated Mika Harigai with an armbar submission in the first round.

On December 26, 2001, Kaneko was knocked out with knees in the first round by at the time debutant Izumi Noguchi at Ax Vol. 2: we want to shine.

Kaneko rebounded with an armbar submission victory over Naoko Torashima at Smackgirl: God Bless You on March 2, 2002.

Kaneko was defeated again by a MMA debutant when she faced Tomomi Sunaba, who won by split decision on May 6, 2002 at Smackgirl: Golden Gate 2002.

On August 4, 2002 at Smackgirl: Summer Gate 2002 Kaneko defeated kickboxer Hisae Watanabe by armbar submission in the second round.

Kaneko got another win on October 5, 2002 at Smackgirl: Japan Cup 2002 Opening Round, where she defeated Aya Koyama by unanimous decision during the first round of the middleweight tournament.

At Smackgirl: Japan Cup 2002 Episode 2 on November 9, 2002 during the semi-finals of the middleweight tournament, Kaneko was able to avenge her previous defeat at the hands of Tomomi Sunaba, defeating Sunaba this time by unanimous decision and advancing to the final.

On December 29, 2002 at Smackgirl: Japan Cup 2002 Grand Final, Kaneko faced MMA star Yuka Tsuji, who defeated Kaneko by unanimous decision in the final of the middleweight tournament.

At the event Arkadia held in Hakuba, Nagano, Kaneko defeated Keiko Matsukawa via armbar submission in the first round on March 29, 2003.

In a rematch of their 2001, Kaneko and Izumi Noguchi fought at the event Smackgirl: Third Season V on July 6, 2003, with Noguchi winning the bout by unanimous decision.

On May 7, 2004, Kaneko participated in the event Golden Muscle Women's MMA: Strongest Queen Tournament (黄金筋肉 女子総合格闘技 最強女王決定トーナメント, ōgon kinniku joshi sōgō kakutōgi saikyōjoō kettei tōnamento) where she defeated Asami Kodera via submission (rear naked choke) in the first round of the tournament, actress, pro-wrestler and race queen Mizuho Ishikawa via submission (armbar) in the semi-finals before finally losing the final against Hisae Watanabe, whom Kaneko had defeated in 2002, via unanimous decision.

At Deep 18th Impact on February 12, 2005, Kaneko tied with Satoko Shinashi, the second women at the time to get a draw against the then unbeaten Shinashi.

Kaneko and Satoko Shinashi had an immediate rematch at Deep 19th Impact on July 8, 2005 in which Shinashi defeated Kaneko by unanimous decision. This was also Kaneko retirement match from MMA.

After returning to karate competitions, Kaneko also returned to MMA on December 11, 2009 at Jewels 6th ring, defeating Abe Ani Combat Club member Rina Tomita by unanimous decision after dominating the fight despite her four-year absence.

=== MMA tag matches ===
Kaneko participated in three MMA tag matches in a one-day tournament at Smackgirl: Strongest Tag Tournament 2002 on July 6, 2002 in which she was partnered with Miwako Ishihara and both defeated Yoko Takahashi and Hisae Watanebe in the first round, Aya Koyama and Hikaru Shinohara in the semi-finals, and Naoko Torashima and Kazue Terui in the final to win the tournament.

== Mixed martial arts record ==
Professional record breakdown
19 matches	10 wins	8 losses
By knockout	0	1
By submission	7	2
By decision	3	5
Draws	1	

Res.	Record	Opponent	Method	Event	Date	Round	Time	Location	Notes
Win	10-8-1	Rina Tomita	Decision (3-0)	Jewels 6th Ring	December 11, 2009	2	5:00	Kabukicho, Tokyo, Japan	
Loss	9-8-1	Satoko Shinashi	Decision (0-3)	Deep: 19th Impact	July 8, 2005	2	5:00	Bunkyo, Tokyo, Japan	
Draw	9-7-1	Satoko Shinashi	Draw	Deep: 18th Impact	February 12, 2005	2	5:00	Bunkyo, Tokyo, Japan	
Loss	9-7-0	Hisae Watanabe	Decision (0-3)	Golden Muscle Women's MMA: Strongest Queen Tournament	May 7, 2004	2	3:00	Koto, Tokyo, Japan	Tournament final
Win	9-6-0	Mizuho Ishikawa	Submission (armbar)	Golden Muscle Women's MMA: Strongest Queen Tournament	May 7, 2004	1	0:47	Koto, Tokyo, Japan	Tournament semi-finals
Win	8-6-0	Asami Kodera	Submission (rear naked choke)	Golden Muscle Women's MMA: Strongest Queen Tournament	May 7, 2004	1	1:17	Koto, Tokyo, Japan	Tournament first round
Loss	7-6-0	Izumi Noguchi	Decision (0-3)	Smackgirl: Third Season V	July 6, 2003	3	5:00	Minato, Tokyo, Japan	
Win	7-5-0	Keiko Matsukawa	Submission (armbar)	Arkadia	March 29, 2003	1	2:21	Hakuba, Nagano Prefecture, Japan	
Loss	6-5-0	Yuka Tsuji	Decision (0-3)	Smackgirl: Japan Cup 2002 Grand Final	December 29, 2002	3	5:00	Chiyoda, Tokyo, Japan	Middleweight tournament final
Win	6-4-0	Tomomi Sunaba	Decision (3-0)	Smackgirl: Japan Cup 2002 Episode 2	November 9, 2002	3	5:00	Koto, Tokyo, Japan	Middleweight tournament semi-finals
Win	5-4-0	Aya Koyama	Decision (3-0)	Smackgirl: Japan Cup 2002 Opening Round	October 5, 2002	3	5:00	Koto, Tokyo, Japan	Middleweight tournament first round
Win	4-4-0	Hisae Watanabe	Submission (armbar)	Smackgirl: Summer Gate 2002	August 4, 2002	2	3:54	Koto, Tokyo, Japan	
Loss	3-4-0	Tomomi Sunaba	Decision (1-2)	Smackgirl: Golden Gate 2002	May 6, 2002	3	5:00	Koto, Tokyo, Japan	
Win	3-3-0	Naoko Torashima	Submission (armbar)	Smackgirl: God Bless You	March 2, 2002	1	2:15	Koto, Tokyo, Japan	
Loss	2-3-0	Izumi Noguchi	KO (knees)	Ax Vol. 2: we want to shine	December 26, 2001	1	1:25	Minato, Tokyo, Japan	
Win	2-2-0	Mika Harigai	Submission (armbar)	Smackgirl: Burning Night	August 23, 2001	1	4:05	Shibuya, Tokyo, Japan	
Loss	1-2-0	Ikuma Hoshino	Submission (guillotine choke)	Smackgirl: Indeed,	July 26, 2001	3	1:50	Shibuya, Tokyo, Japan	
Win	1-1-0	Miwako Ishihara	Submission (armbar)	Smackgirl: Episode 0	December 17, 2000	1	0:36	Bunkyo, Tokyo, Japan	
Loss	0-1-0	Yoko Takahashi	Submission (achilles lock)	Club Fight Round 1	November 12, 2000	1	4:01	Shibuya, Tokyo, Japan	

== Championships and accomplishments ==
=== Karate ===
- All-Japan RF Karate Championships 1999 runner-up
- All-Japan RF Karate Championships 2000 runner-up
- All-Japan RF Karate Championships 2001 winner
- All-Japan RF Karate Championships 2002 winner
- All-Japan RF Karate Championships -50 kg 2003 winner
- All-Japan RF Karate Championships -50 kg 2004 runner-up
- All-Japan RF Karate Championships -52 kg 2009 runner-up
- All-Japan RF Karate Championships -52 kg 2010 runner-up

=== Mixed martial arts ===
- All-Japan Amateur Shooto Championships women's flyweight 1999 winner
- Smackgirl Japan Cup 2002 middleweight runner-up
- Strongest Queen Tournament 2004 runner-up

== See also ==
- List of female mixed martial artists
