= Marloes Coenen =

Dutch-American mixed martial arts (MMA) fighter (born 1981)

- Born: Marloes Coenen; March 31, 1981 (age 45); Olst, Netherlands
- Other names: Female Rickson; Rumina
- Height: 5 ft 9 in (1.75 m)
- Weight: 145 lb (66 kg; 10 st 5 lb)
- Reach: 67 1/2 in (171 cm)
- Style: Freestyle Wrestling, Brazilian Jiu-Jitsu, Kickboxing, Muay Thai
- Fighting out of: Amsterdam, Netherlands
- Team: Golden Glory; R-Grip
- Years active: 2000–2017

Mixed martial arts record
- Total: 31
- Wins: 23
- By knockout: 3
- By submission: 17
- By decision: 3
- Losses: 8
- By knockout: 4
- By submission: 2
- By decision: 2

Other information
- Mixed martial arts record from Sherdog

Marloes Coenen (born March 31, 1981) is a retired Dutch mixed martial artist. She competed professionally from 2000 to 2017 and is a former Strikeforce Women's Bantamweight Champion.

== Early life ==
Coenen's brothers and grandfather were both involved in martial arts, with the latter having trained in jiu-jitsu, and this aided Coenen with her own transition into the sport.

She began training with Pierre Drachman and Martijn de Jong at Shooto Holland while only 14, who recalls that, "I really had respect for that, because it didn't matter if it rained or snowed. She still kept on coming." She started martial arts training because she had to bicycle alone through a lonely part of the forest to and from school, and she had heard rumors that there were "dirty men in the forest" who preyed on girls.

Along with her competitive career, Coenen is planning to study Communications Sciences in Amsterdam with a goal of future employment in that sector. She was appointed to the municipal advisory council Sportraad Amsterdam and is the city´s ambassador for martial arts.

== Mixed martial arts career ==
Coenen debuted in mixed martial arts in November 2000 and scored eight consecutive victories, winning the 2000 ReMix World Cup along the way. This was the first female MMA championship making her the first ever female MMA champion.

Prior to a 2004 fight with Erin Toughill, Coenen was alleged to have referred to Toughill as the "personification of arrogance." However, she later confirmed that no such statements were made, and has mostly positive things to say about Toughill.

She later advanced to the finals of the 2007 K-GRACE tournament, but lost to Roxanne Modafferi by split decision.

Coenen signed a contract with Elite XC shortly before the promotion folded in 2008, but did not receive a chance to compete before its closure.

=== Strikeforce ===
Following Strikeforce: Carano vs. Cyborg on August 15, 2009, it was announced that Coenen would likely be the first challenger for new Strikeforce Women's Featherweight Champion Cris Cyborg.

Coenen, who was in attendance at the post-fight press conference, later addressed the proposed fight with Cyborg and other potential fights under the Strikeforce banner.

However, Cyborg suffered an injury and Coenen was then set to compete in a rematch with Toughill at Strikeforce: Fedor vs. Rogers to determine the first title challenger.

On October 27, 2009, Toughill withdrew from the fight due to an undisclosed medical condition, but Coenen still competed on the card in a rematch against Roxanne Modafferi. She defeated Modafferi by armbar submission in the first round.

Coenen challenged for Cyborg's title at Strikeforce: Miami on January 30, 2010. She lost the fight by TKO in the third round.

Coenen expressed a desire to fight again for Strikeforce on June 26, 2010, but Strikeforce CEO Scott Coker confirmed that Coenen would not be competing on the card.

Coenen was invited to take part in the August 2010 Strikeforce women's tournament at 135 pounds and verbally agreed to participate. However, on July 10, 2010, it was confirmed that she was no longer scheduled to be part of the tournament.

On July 22, 2010, Strikeforce announced that Coenen would drop down to 135 pounds to face Sarah Kaufman for the Strikeforce Women's Bantamweight Championship. Coenen was named the number one contender for the title, while the winner of the Strikeforce 135-pound one-night tournament, Miesha Tate, will assume the number two contender spot behind Coenen.

She will continue to compete at 145 pounds as well and Strikeforce had planned to set up a rematch between Coenen and Cindy Dandois sometime in 2010. On August 19, 2010, it was reported that the rematch was off.

Coenen faced Sarah Kaufman for the Strikeforce Women's Bantamweight Championship on October 9, 2010, in San Jose, California. Coenen won the fight by submission due to an armbar in the third round to become Women's Bantamweight Champion (135 lbs).

She was also scheduled to compete one week later at Ultimate Glory 12 on October 16, 2010, in Amsterdam, Holland, against Lena Buytendijk. However, it was announced during the event that the fight had been cancelled.

Coenen was scheduled to defend her Strikeforce title against Miesha Tate at Strikeforce: Feijao vs. Henderson on March 5, 2011. Tate was forced off the card due to injury. Liz Carmouche stepped in on short notice to face Coenen for the title. Coenen defeated Carmouche via triangle choke in the fourth round.

Coenen defended her title against Miesha Tate at Strikeforce: Fedor vs. Henderson on July 30, 2011, and lost via submission due to an arm-triangle choke in the fourth round. This was the first time that Coenen had been submitted in MMA. Prior to the bout, Zuffa management changed the name of Coenen's title from Welterweight to Bantamweight in order to keep all weight classes the same.

On August 3, 2011, Golden Glory announced that Coenen had been released from her contract by Strikeforce.

=== Invicta FC and Dream ===
On August 26, 2011, Coenen announced that she had signed a three-fight, non-exclusive deal with North Carolina–based organization BlackEye Promotions for a February 2012 debut. However, Coenen remained under a verbal agreement with the promotion only and did not in fact sign a contract. She instead signed on as the first contracted athlete to Invicta Fighting Championships. Coenen returned to 145 pounds to headline the first all-female Invicta Fighting Championships card against Romy Ruyssen on April 28, 2012, in Kansas City, Kansas. She defeated Ruyssen by unanimous decision.

Coenen faced Fiona Muxlow at Dream 18 on December 31, 2012. She defeated Muxlow by armbar submission in the first round.

Coenen faced Cris Cyborg in a rematch for the inaugural Invicta FC Featherweight Championship at Invicta FC 6: Coenen vs. Cyborg on July 13, 2013. Cyborg defeated Coenen again via TKO in the fourth round to become the first Invicta FC Featherweight Champion.

=== Bellator MMA ===
In August 2014, it was announced that Bellator had signed Marloes Coenen.

Coenen made her debut against Annalisa Bucci on October 24, 2014, at Bellator 130. She won the fight via submission in the third round.

She was set to face Julia Budd for the inaugural Bellator Woman's Featherweight Championship at Bellator 155, however Budd pulled out due to injury and was replaced by Alexis Dufresne, making the bout no longer for the title. Coenen lost the bout via submission in the first round.

Coenen was scheduled to face Talita Nogueira at Bellator 163 but the bout was cancelled the day before the event when Talita failed to make weight.

Coenen faced Julia Budd for Bellator's inaugural women's featherweight championship, at Bellator 174 on March 3, 2017. Coenen lost the fight via TKO in the fourth round and subsequently announced her retirement from MMA after the fight.

== Grappling career ==
Coenen competed in the first women's divisions at the ADCC World Championships on May 27 and 28, 2005. She defeated Yuki Kondo Kubota in the opening round and lost to Stacy Cartwright in the over 60 kg division, before defeating Cartwright and losing to Tara LaRosa in the absolute division.

== Championships and accomplishments ==
=== Mixed martial arts ===
- Strikeforce
  - Strikeforce Women's Bantamweight Championship (One time)
    - One successful title defense
- Smackgirl
  - 2000 ReMix World Cup Openweight Champion

=== Submission grappling ===
- ADCC Submission Wrestling World Championship
  - 2007 ADCC European Trials +60 kg Winner

== Mixed martial arts record ==
Professional record breakdown
31 matches	23 wins	8 losses
By knockout	3	4
By submission	17	2
By decision	3	2

Res.	Record	Opponent	Method	Event	Date	Round	Time	Location	Notes
Loss	23–8	Julia Budd	TKO (punches)	Bellator 174	March 3, 2017	4	2:42	Thackerville, Oklahoma, United States	For the inaugural Bellator Women's Featherweight Championship.
Loss	23–7	Alexis Dufresne	Submission (triangle armbar)	Bellator 155	May 20, 2016	1	4:33	Boise, Idaho, United States	Catchweight bout (150 lb); Dufresne missed weight.
Win	23–6	Arlene Blencowe	Submission (armbar)	Bellator 141	August 28, 2015	2	3:23	Temecula, California, United States	
Win	22–6	Annalisa Bucci	Submission (rear-naked choke)	Bellator 130	October 24, 2014	3	0:57	Mulvane, Kansas, United States	
Loss	21–6	Cris Cyborg	TKO (punches and elbows)	Invicta FC 6: Coenen vs. Cyborg	July 13, 2013	4	4:02	Kansas City, Missouri, United States	For the inaugural Invicta FC Featherweight Championship.
Win	21–5	Fiona Muxlow	Submission (armbar)	Dream 18	December 31, 2012	1	3:29	Saitama, Japan	
Win	20–5	Romy Ruyssen	Decision (unanimous)	Invicta FC 1: Coenen vs. Ruyssen	April 28, 2012	3	5:00	Kansas City, Kansas, United States	
Loss	19–5	Miesha Tate	Submission (arm-triangle choke)	Strikeforce: Fedor vs. Henderson	July 30, 2011	4	3:03	Hoffman Estates, Illinois, United States	Lost the Strikeforce Women's Bantamweight Championship.
Win	19–4	Liz Carmouche	Submission (triangle choke)	Strikeforce: Feijao vs. Henderson	March 5, 2011	4	1:29	Columbus, Ohio, United States	Defended the Strikeforce Women's Bantamweight Championship.
Win	18–4	Sarah Kaufman	Submission (armbar)	Strikeforce: San Jose	October 9, 2010	3	1:59	San Jose, California, United States	Won the Strikeforce Women's Bantamweight Championship.
Loss	17–4	Cris Cyborg	TKO (punches)	Strikeforce: Miami	January 30, 2010	3	3:40	Sunrise, Florida, United States	For the Strikeforce Women's Featherweight Championship.
Win	17–3	Roxanne Modafferi	Submission (armbar)	Strikeforce: Fedor vs. Rogers	November 7, 2009	1	1:05	Hoffman Estates, Illinois, United States	Strikeforce Debut.
Loss	16–3	Cindy Dandois	Decision (unanimous)	Beast of the East	January 24, 2009	3	5:00	Zutphen, Netherlands	
Win	16–2	Asci Kubra	TKO (punches)	KOE: Tough Is Not Enough	October 5, 2008	1	1:51	Rotterdam, Netherlands	
Win	15–2	Romy Ruyssen	Submission (rear-naked choke)	SLV 3: Thaibox Gala Night	August 2, 2008	2	4:45	Basel, Switzerland	
Win	14–2	Asci Kubra	Submission (armbar)	Beast of the East	May 31, 2008	1	N/A	Zutphen, Netherlands	
Loss	13–2	Roxanne Modafferi	Decision (split)	K-Grace 1	May 27, 2007	2	3:00	Tokyo, Japan	
Win	13–1	Magdalena Jarecka	Submission (rear-naked choke)	K-Grace 1	May 27, 2007	2	1:35	Tokyo, Japan	
Win	12–1	Keiko Tamai	Submission (rear-naked choke)	K-Grace 1	May 27, 2007	1	2:01	Tokyo, Japan	
Win	11–1	Majanka Lathouwers	Submission (armbar)	Shooto Holland: Ultimate Glory 2	January 21, 2007	2	3:10	Utrecht, Netherlands	
Win	10–1	Yoko Takahashi	Submission (armbar)	G-Shooto: G-Shooto 04	March 11, 2006	1	0:39	Tokyo, Japan	
Win	9–1	Yuuki Kondo	KO (punch)	Smackgirl: Cool Fighter's Last Stand	April 30, 2005	2	0:50	Shizuoka Prefecture, Japan	
Loss	8–1	Erin Toughill	KO (punch)	Smackgirl: World ReMix 2004	December 19, 2004	1	5:00	Shizuoka Prefecture, Japan	
Win	8–0	Yoko Takahashi	TKO (punches)	Smackgirl: World ReMix 2004	December 19, 2004	1	2:30	Shizuoka Prefecture, Japan	
Win	7–0	Miwako Ishihara	Decision (majority)	Shooto: Wanna Shooto 2002	April 14, 2002	2	5:00	Tokyo, Japan	
Win	6–0	Megumi Yabushita	Submission (rear-naked choke)	Jd': No Holds Barred	January 13, 2002	1	2:27	Tokyo, Japan	
Win	5–0	Yoko Takahashi	Submission (armbar)	ReMix: Golden Gate 2001	May 3, 2001	1	1:11	Japan	
Win	4–0	Megumi Yabushita	Decision (unanimous)	ReMix: World Cup 2000	December 5, 2000	3	5:00	Nippon Budokan, Japan	ReMix World Cup, final
Win	3–0	Becky Levi	Submission (flying armbar)	ReMix: World Cup 2000	December 5, 2000	1	1:25	Nippon Budokan, Japan	ReMix World Cup, semifinals
Win	2–0	Mika Harigai	Submission (rear-naked choke)	ReMix: World Cup 2000	December 5, 2000	1	0:31	Nippon Budokan, Japan	ReMix World Cup, quarterfinals
Win	1–0	Yuuki Kondo	Submission (armbar)	LLPW – L-1 2000: The Strongest Lady	November 22, 2000	1	2:37	Tokyo, Japan	

== Kickboxing and Muay Thai record ==
Professional Muay Thai & Kickboxing record
Date	Result	Opponent	Event	Location	Method	Round	Time
2006-02-04	Loss	(Netherlands) Orinta van der Zee	Rumble Of Amsterdam 2	Amsterdam, Netherlands	Decision	5	2:00
Legend: Win Loss Draw/No contest Notes

== See also ==
- List of female mixed martial artists

Awards and achievements
Preceded by Sarah Kaufman	2nd Strikeforce Women's Bantamweight Champion; October 9, 2010 – July 30, 2011	Succeeded by Miesha Tate
