= Jewels 9th Ring =

Mixed martial arts event in 2010

- The poster for Jewels 9th Ring
- Promotion: Jewels
- Date: July 31, 2010
- Venue: Shinjuku Face
- City: Kabukicho, Tokyo, Japan
- Attendance: 578

Event chronology
Jewels 8th Ring	Jewels 9th Ring	Jewels 10th Ring

Jewels 9th Ring was a mixed martial arts (MMA) event held by MMA promotion Jewels. The event took place on July 31, 2010 at Shinjuku Face in Kabukicho, Tokyo, Japan.

== Background ==
On May 25, 2010, Jewels announced that the event would hold the first round of the Jewels Lightweight Queen Grand Prix; an 8-woman tournament to crown the first lightweight (-52 kg (115 lb)) champion. Shizuka Sugiyama was added to the card along with some other fighters for the tournament on June 23, 2010. More fighters for the lightweight tournament were announced on June 27, 2010. It was announced on July 7, 2010 that Sugiyama would fight in a shoot boxing match against Mongolian pro-wrestler Esui, plus two more matches were added to the card. The rest of the fighters were announced on July 20, 2010.

On July 24, 2010, it was announced that Sugiyama would not participate in the event due to injury and Esui would fight in a regular MMA match instead of shoot boxing against Mayumi Aoki. The order of the fights was revealed on July 29, 2010. The weigh-ins took place one day later.

== Results ==
- 1st match: Jewels official rules -56 kg bout, 5 min / 2 R

(Japan) Harumi (55.5 kg (122 lb), Blue Dog Gym) vs. (Japan) Emi Murata (54.7 kg (121 lb), Abe Ani Combat Club)

Murata defeated Harumi by submission (armbar) at 1:08 of round 1.

Murata punched Harumi and did a neck throw from which she quickly worked an armbar to win the fight.

- 2nd match: Jewels official rules -52 kg bout, 5 min / 2 R

(Japan) Yuko Oya (51.9 kg (114 lb), DEEP Official Gym Impact) vs. (Japan) Misaki Ozawa (51.0 kg (112.4 lb), Zendokai Matsumoto)

Oya defeated Ozawa by submission (armbar) at 2:27 of round 2.

After exchanging punches during the first round, Oya took the fight to the ground where she controlled the fight. In the second round, Oya once again took the fight to the ground where this time she was able to submit Ozawa with an armbar.

- 3rd match: Jewels official rules -48 kg bout, 5 min / 2 R

(Japan) Yukiko Seki (47.1 kg (104 lb), Fight Chix) vs. (Japan) Miyoko Kusaka (47.7 kg (105 lb), Grabaka)

Seki defeated Kusaka by submission (rear naked choke) at 0:50 of round 2.

During the first round, Kusaka controlled the fight with punches and throws, but Seki caught Kusaka's back at the beginning of the second round and got a rear naked choke that forced Kusaka to submit.

- 4th match: Jewels official rules -63 kg bout, 5 min / 2 R

(Japan) Mayumi Aoki (61.0 kg (134.5 lb), Gamurannac) vs. (Mongolia) Esui (63.0 kg (138.9 lb), Smash Alley Gym)

Aoki defeated Esui by submission (armbar) at 4:34 of round 1.

Despite the 14 cm (5.5 in) difference, Esui was unable to take advantage of the situation as Aoki countered Esui attacks with a takedown followed by submission attempts. After both fighters were stood back up, Aoki got another takedown and immediately applied an armbar, forcing Esui to tap out.

- 5th match: Shoot boxing rules -53 kg bout, 2 min / 3 R (extension 2 R)

(Japan) Ai Takahashi (53.0 kg (116.8 lb), Caesar Gym) vs. (Japan) Emiko Matsumoto (53.0 kg (116.8 lb), Nagoya Fight Club)

Takahashi defeated Matsumoto by TKO (referee stoppage, punches) at 3:19 of round 3.

Takahashi controlled the fight with superior striking, making red Matsumoto's face by the end of the first round. Matsumoto, however, was able to resist Takahashi's continuous attacks until round three, when the referee stopped the fight after Mastumoto was no longer defending well.

- 6th match: Jewels official rules -48 kg bout, 5 min / 2 R

(Japan) Misaki Takimoto (52.0 kg (114.6 lb), Zendokai Yokohama) vs. (England) Lisa Newton (51.2 kg (113 lb), Team Akurei)

Takimoto defeated Newton by submission (rear naked choke) at 2:10 of round 1.

After a punching exchange, Takimoto was able to corner Newton and took her down, taking her back and ending the fight with a rear naked choke.

- 7th match: Jewels lightweight GP 2010: Jewels first lightweight queen decision tournament, 1st round - Jewels official rules, 5 min / 2 R

(Japan) Ayaka Hamasaki (51.7 kg (114 lb), Abe Ani Combat Club) vs. (South Korea) Han Sol Lee (52.0 kg (114.6 lb), CMA Korea UF Gym)

Hamasaki defeated Lee by submission (kimura) at 0:48 of round 1.

In an impressive performance, Hamasaki quickly took down Lee and tried an armbar, but Lee defended and Hamasaki changed her submission into a Kimura which made Lee tap.

- 8th match: Jewels lightweight GP 2010: Jewels first lightweight queen decision tournament, 1st round - Jewels official rules, 5 min / 2 R

(Norway) Celine Haga (51.5 kg (114 lb), Hellboy Hansen MMA) vs. (Japan) Mika Nagano (51.8 kg (114 lb), S-Keep/Core)

Nagano defeated Haga by submission (armbar) at 2:52 of round 1.

Haga started throwing punches at Nagano, who responded by taking Haga down. Haga reversed the takedown and took the mount, but Nagano was able to regain first half guard and then full guard from which she attempted a triangle choke and then an armbar with which she submitted Haga.

- 9th match: Jewels lightweight GP 2010: Jewels first lightweight queen decision tournament, 1st round - Jewels official rules, 5 min / 2 R

(South Korea) Seo Hee Ham (51.8 kg (114 lb), CMA Korea Team Mad) vs. (Japan) Mai Ichii (51.5 kg (114 lb), Ice Ribbon)

Ham defeated Ichii by decision (3-0).

Despite Ichii's attempts, Ham dominated the striking exchanges with ease. Ham tried several submissions during the fight and controlled the fight, while Ichii ended worn-out. With a dominant performance, the judges awarded the unanimous decision to Ham.

- 10th match: Jewels lightweight GP 2010: Jewels first lightweight queen decision tournament, 1st round - Jewels official rules, 5 min / 2 R

(Japan) Saori Ishioka (51.9 kg (114 lb), Zendokai Koganei) vs. (Japan) Sakura Nomura (51.5 kg (114 lb), Club Barbarian Impact)

Nomura defeated Ishioka by decision (0-3).

In the first round, Nomura took down Ishioka and controlled the fight on the ground, attempting several submissions. In the second round, Ishioka tried to keep the fight on their feet, but Nomura took her down again and continued to dominate Ishioka in the ground fight. Although unable to get a submission, Nomura got the unanimous decision to complete the upset and defeat one of the tournament favorites.
