= Ikuma Hoshino =

Japanese judoka

- Born: Mariko Yamanishi; November 6, 1981 (age 44); Wakayama Prefecture, Japan
- Other names: Natural grappling girl, Mar★tin, Marting Star
- Nationality: Japanese
- Height: 1.55 m (5 ft 1 in)
- Weight: 56 kg (123 lb)
- Division: Flyweight
- Fighting out of: Japan
- Team: Very Good Man→DB55
- Years active: 2001-2003

Mixed martial arts record
- Total: 11
- Wins: 9
- By knockout: 3
- By submission: 4
- By decision: 1
- By disqualification: 1
- Losses: 1
- By submission: 1
- Draws: 1

Other information
- Website: Official website (Internet Archive)
- Mixed martial arts record from Sherdog
- Last updated on: September 28, 2010

Ikuma Hoshino (星野 育蒔, hoshino ikuma; born on November 6, 1981) is a retired Japanese female mixed martial arts (MMA) fighter and judoka. Her real name is Mariko Yamanishi (山西 真理子, yamanishi mariko). Her nicknames are natural grappling girl (天然格闘少女, tennen kakutō shōjo) and Mar★tin (マァ★ティン, maa ★ tein; occasionally transliterated as Marting Star).

She participated in MMA promotions ReMix, Smackgirl, Shooto and Ax.

== Background ==
Hoshino was born on November 6, 1981 in Wakayama Prefecture, Japan. She began training in judo while in senior high school and got in the best four in the Kinki senior high school tournament.

== Mixed martial arts career ==
At 19 years old, Hoshino debuted at ReMix Golden Gate 2001 on May 3, 2001, defeating four-time national judo champion, 1993 and 1998 silver medallist and three-time World Cup winner, Russian Tatyana Kuvshinova via KO.

Hoshino got another KO victory against Akemi Torisu, whom she defeated on May 24, 2001 at Smackgirl: Starting Over.

At Smackgirl: Fighting Chance on June 28, 2001, Hoshino defeated Mika Harigai with a guillotine choke submission.

Hoshino got her second victory via guillotine choke against Mari Kaneko on July 26, 2001 at Smackgirl: Indeed.

Continuing her undefeated streak, Hoshino defeated Mako Ito by submission (straight armbar) on August 23, 2001 at Smackgirl 4: Burning Night.

Hoshino's first and only unanimous decision win came on October 31, 2001 at Ax Vol. 1: we do the justice, where she defeated women's MMA pioneer Yuuki Kondo.

On December 26, 2001, Hoshino was defeated for the first and only time by then debutant Yuka Tsuji via armbar submission at Ax Vol. 2: we want to shine, an upset at the time, when Hoshino was the most accomplished female Japanese MMA fighter.

Hoshino rebounded with a TKO victory over Yoshiko Onoue on February 28, 2002 at Shooto Gig East Vol. 8.

Hoshino submitted Hiromi Oka with a scarf hold armlock on May 4, 2002 at Ax Vol. 3.

At Ax Vol. 5, Hoshino won against Tomomi Sunaba when Sunaba illegally kicked Hoshino in the face while she was on the ground, getting disqualified for that action on July 26, 2002.

On February 23, 2003, Sunaba drew with Dutch fighter Audrey Kruyning at Shooto - 2/23 in Korakuen Hall. After the bout she declared that she wanted to return with her family in Wakayama and to take a rest from professional activities for a while. She has not fought since then.

== Mixed martial arts record ==
Professional record breakdown
11 matches	9 wins	1 loss
By knockout	3	0
By submission	4	1
By decision	1	0
By disqualification	1	0
Draws	1	

Res.	Record	Opponent	Method	Event	Date	Round	Time	Location	Notes
Draw	9-1-1	Audrey Kruyning	Draw (0-1)	Shooto - 2/23 in Korakuen Hall	February 23, 2003	2	5:00	Bunkyo, Tokyo, Japan	
Win	9-1-0	Tomomi Sunaba	DQ (kicking a downed opponent)	Ax Vol. 5	July 26, 2002	1	0:13	Bunkyo, Tokyo, Japan	
Win	8-1-0	Hiromi Oka	Submission (scarf hold armlock)	Ax Vol. 3	May 4, 2002	2	3:09	Bunkyo, Tokyo, Japan	
Win	7-1-0	Yoshiko Onoue	TKO (corner stoppage)	Shooto: Gig East 8	February 28, 2002	2	4:38	Setagaya, Tokyo, Japan	
Loss	6-1-0	Yuka Tsuji	Submission (armbar)	Ax Vol. 2: we want to shine	December 26, 2001	3	3:37	Minato, Tokyo, Japan	
Win	6-0-0	Yuuki Kondo	Decision (3-0)	Ax Vol. 1: we do the justice	October 31, 2001	3	5:00	Setagaya, Tokyo, Japan	
Win	5-0-0	Mako Ito	Submission (straight armbar)	Smackgirl 4: Burning Night	August 23, 2001	1	2:18	Shibuya, Tokyo, Japan	
Win	4-0-0	Mari Kaneko	Submission (guillotine choke)	Smackgirl: Indeed	July 26, 2001	3	1:50	Shibuya, Tokyo, Japan	
Win	3-0-0	Mika Harigai	Submission (guillotine choke)	Smackgirl: Fighting Chance	June 28, 2001	2	4:16	Shibuya, Tokyo, Japan	
Win	2-0-0	Akemi Torisu	KO (knee)	Smackgirl: Starting Over	May 24, 2001	1	2:49	Shibuya, Tokyo, Japan	
Win	1-0-0	Tatyana Kuvshinova	KO (punch)	ReMix Golden Gate 2001	May 3, 2001	3	1:12	Shibuya, Tokyo, Japan	

== See also ==
- List of female mixed martial artists
