= Yuuki Kondo =

Japanese judoka

- Born: Yuuki Kubota; August 28, 1974 (age 52); Numazu, Shizuoka Prefecture, Japan
- Other names: Cool Fighter
- Nationality: Japanese
- Height: 1.70 m (5 ft 7 in)
- Weight: 65 kg (143 lb)
- Division: Featherweight
- Style: Judo
- Fighting out of: Japan
- Team: Capture international (2000); Office Aramusha (2001); Team Aramusha (2001–2002); Aramusha Sogo Kakutojutsu (2002–2004); Purebred Kyoto (2004–2007); Red Shark (2007–2010)
- Years active: 2000–2005

Mixed martial arts record
- Total: 17
- Wins: 11
- By knockout: 1
- By submission: 8
- By decision: 2
- Losses: 5
- By knockout: 1
- By submission: 3
- By decision: 1
- Draws: 1

Other information
- Spouse: Tetsuya Kondo (2004–2010)
- Website: Official blog
- Mixed martial arts record from Sherdog
- Last updated on: December 7, 2010

Yuuki Kondo (近藤 有希, kondō yūki; born on August 28, 1974), née Yuuki Kubota (久保田 有希, kubota yūki), is a retired Japanese female mixed martial artist and judoka. She is nicknamed Cool Fighter (クール・ファイター, kūru faitā) in reference to her calm appearance when fighting.

== Background ==
Kondo was born on August 28, 1974 in Numazu, Shizuoka Prefecture, Japan.

== Martial arts training ==
Kondo practiced judo in high school where she was a decorated judoka.

== Mixed martial arts career ==
Kondo made her professional debut at Ladies Legend Pro-Wrestling (LLPW) event L-1 2000 The Strongest Lady, being defeated by Dutch fighter Marloes Coenen via submission (armbar) in the first round on November 22, 2000.

In her second fight, Kondo defeated Dutch fighter Yuta Dum by TKO after Dum injured her ankle and was unable to come out for the second round on May 3, 2001 at ReMix Golden Gate 2001.

At Smackgirl: Starting Over on May 24, 2001, Kondo defeated Mika Harigai in 49 seconds with an armbar submission.

Continuing her winning streak, Kondo defeated Aya Koyama by unanimous decision on June 28, 2001 at Smackgirl: Fighting Chance.

At Smackgirl: Burning Night on August 23, 2001, Kondo got her fourth straight victory against Megumi Sato, whom Kondo defeated with an armbar submission in the first round.

On September 27, 2001, Kondo had a rematch against Mika Harigai, whom kondo defeated once again with an armbar submission in the first round at Smackgirl: Alive!.

Kondo's second professional loss came on October 31, 2001 at the event Ax Vol. 1: we do the justice, where Kondo lost against then undefeated Japanese women's MMA star Ikuma Hoshino via unanimous decision.

Rebounding with a victory, Kondo submitted Hiromi Kanai in 34 seconds with an armbar on February 3, 2002 at Smackgirl: Pioneering Spirit.

Kondo next drew against Yoko Takahashi after three rounds at the event Zero-One: True Century Creation '02 held on March 2, 2002.

At Ax Vol. 3 on May 4, 2002, Kondo defeated Yuki Morimatsu via submission (armbar) in the first round.

At Ax Vol. 4 on June 26, 2002, American Angela Reestad gave Kondo her third professional loss by submitting her with an armbar that made Kondo scream in pain and forced her to tap in the first round.

Kondo got back on the winning track by defeating Keiko Tamai via unanimous decision at Smackgirl: Japan Cup 2002 Grand Final on December 29, 2002.

On March 3, 2003 at Smackgirl: Third Season I, Kondo defeated Guatemalan Mayra Conde by armbar submission in the first round.

At Smackgirl: Third Season III celebrated on May 7, 2003, Kondo defeated Dutch fighter Fatiha Abalhaja with an armbar submission in the third round.

Earning her fourth consecutive win, Kondo submitted American fighter Sarah Boyd with an Americana in the third round at Smackgirl 2004: Go West on June 19, 2004. It was the first time that she fought with her married name and as a member of Purebred Kyoto.

On September 11, 2004 Kondo announced her intentions to retire to dedicate herself to her personal life and possibly give birth.

Her retirement match was supposed to be at Smackgirl 2004: Yuuki Kondo Retirement Celebration on November 4, 2004 in a bout that she lost against American Amanda Buckner via submission (kneebar) in the second round.

Kondo had her final professional fight at Smackgirl 2005: Cool Fighter Last Stand on April 30, 2005 in a rematch against Marloes Coenen, who once again defeated Kondo, this time knocking her out in the second round.

Kondo had one more grappling match against Marloes Coenen in the +60 kg category of the 2005 ADCC Submission Wrestling World Championship held in California, United States, where Coenen submitted Kondo with a kneebar in the quarterfinals.

On March 28, 2010 in her blog, Kondo announced her intentions to return to MMA.

== Personal life ==
In 2004, Kondo (then Kubota) married Purebreed Kyoto owner and Brazilian Jiu-Jitsu instructor Tetsuya Kondo. They have one daughter who was born in 2006. Together they operated the Red Shark Jiu Jitsu Academy in Numazu. They got divorced in May 2010, closing the academy located in Numazu before Tetsuya moved out to Tokyo.

== Mixed martial arts record ==
Professional record breakdown
| 17 matches | 11 wins | 5 losses |
| By knockout | 1 | 1 |
| By submission | 8 | 3 |
| By decision | 2 | 1 |
| Draws | 1 | |

| Res. | Record | Opponent | Method | Event | Date | Round | Time | Location | Notes |
|---|---|---|---|---|---|---|---|---|---|
| Loss | 11-5-1 | (Netherlands) Marloes Coenen | KO (punch) | Smackgirl 2005: Cool Fighter Last Stand | April 30, 2005 | 2 | 0:50 | Numazu, Japan | |
| Loss | 11-4-1 | (United States) Amanda Buckner | Submission (kneebar) | Smackgirl 2004: Yuuki Kondo Retirement Celebration | November 4, 2004 | 2 | 0:41 | Tokyo, Japan | |
| Win | 11-3-1 | (United States) Sarah Boyd | Submission (keylock) | Smackgirl 2004: Go West | June 19, 2004 | 3 | 3:35 | Osaka, Japan | |
| Win | 10-3-1 | (Netherlands) Fatiha Abalhaja | Submission (armbar) | Smackgirl: Third Season III | May 7, 2003 | 3 | 3:28 | Tokyo, Japan | |
| Win | 9-3-1 | (Guatemala) Mayra Conde | Submission (armbar) | Smackgirl: Third Season I | March 3, 2003 | 1 | 2:20 | Tokyo, Japan | |
| Win | 8-3-1 | (Japan) Keiko Tamai | Decision (3-0) | Smackgirl: Japan Cup 2002 Grand Final | December 29, 2002 | 3 | 5:00 | Tokyo, Japan | |
| Loss | 7-3-1 | (United States) Angela Reestad | Submission (armbar) | Ax Vol. 4 | June 26, 2002 | 1 | 2:18 | Tokyo, Japan | |
| Win | 7-2-1 | (Japan) Yuki Morimatsu | Submission (armbar) | Ax Vol. 3 | May 4, 2002 | 1 | 1:23 | Tokyo, Japan | |
| Draw | 6-2-1 | (Japan) Yoko Takahashi | Draw | Zero-One: True Century Creation '02 | March 2, 2002 | 3 | 3:00 | Tokyo, Japan | |
| Win | 6-2-0 | (Japan) Hiromi Kanai | Submission (armbar) | Smackgirl: Pioneering Spirit | February 3, 2002 | 1 | 0:34 | Tokyo, Japan | |
| Loss | 5-2-0 | (Japan) Ikuma Hoshino | Decision (0-3) | Ax Vol. 1: we do the justice | October 31, 2001 | 3 | 5:00 | Tokyo, Japan | |
| Win | 5-1-0 | (Japan) Mika Harigai | Submission (armbar) | Smackgirl: Alive! | September 27, 2001 | 1 | 1:34 | Tokyo, Japan | |
| Win | 4-1-0 | (Japan) Megumi Sato | Submission (armbar) | Smackgirl: Burning Night | August 23, 2001 | 1 | 0:44 | Tokyo, Japan | |
| Win | 3-1-0 | (Japan) Aya Koyama | Decision (3-0) | Smackgirl: Fighting Chance | June 28, 2001 | 3 | 5:00 | Tokyo, Japan | |
| Win | 2-1-0 | (Japan) Mika Harigai | Submission (armbar) | Smackgirl: Starting Over | May 24, 2001 | 1 | 0:49 | Tokyo, Japan | |
| Win | 1-1-0 | (Netherlands) Yuta Dum | TKO (ankle injury) | ReMix Golden Gate 2001 | May 3, 2001 | 1 | 5:00 | Tokyo, Japan | |
| Loss | 0-1-0 | (Netherlands) Marloes Coenen | Submission (armbar) | LLPW: L-1 2000 The Strongest Lady | November 22, 2000 | 1 | 2:37 | Tokyo, Japan | |

== See also ==
- List of female mixed martial artists
