= Mai Ichii =

Japanese professional wrestler, mixed martial artist and kickboxer

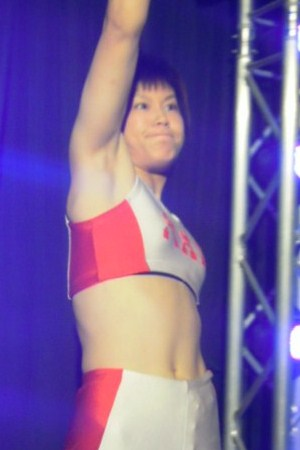
- Born: March 21, 1980 (age 46); Ageo, Saitama Prefecture, Japan
- Nationality: Japanese
- Height: 1.58 m (5 ft 2 in)
- Weight: 55 kg (121 lb)
- Style: Kickboxing
- Fighting out of: Saitama, Saitama Prefecture, Japan
- Team: Ice Ribbon; Ito Dojo
- Years active: 2006-present (MMA); 2007-present (kickboxing)

Kickboxing record
- Total: 5
- Wins: 2
- Losses: 2
- Draws: 1

Mixed martial arts record
- Total: 9
- Wins: 4
- By knockout: 1
- By submission: 1
- By decision: 2
- Losses: 5
- By submission: 1
- By decision: 4

Other information
- Website: Official blog
- Mixed martial arts record from Sherdog
- Last updated on: January 1, 2011

Mai Ichii (市井 舞, Ichii Mai; born March 21, 1980) is a Japanese wrestler, mixed martial artist and kickboxer.

== Background ==
Ichii was born on March 21, 1980 in Ageo, Saitama Prefecture, Japan.

== Professional wrestling career ==
Ichii debuted in 2004 in a match against Emi Sakura.

Ichii wrestled from 2004 to 2011, mainly for Sakura's Ice Ribbon promotion, and then retired for two years; she was active again in 2014 and 2015 and then retired permanently.

Her final match was on July 26, 2015 against La Malcriada; the match was held by Hokuto Pro Wrestling in Hokkaido.

== Mixed martial arts career ==
Ichii's debut in MMA was on November 29, 2006 at Smackgirl 2006: Legend of Extreme Women, where she was defeated via unanimous decision by Emi Fujino.

More than a year later, on her next match, Ichii defeated Yukiko Seki by TKO (punches) to win the Universal Kickboxing Federation (UKF) Women's MMA Intercontinental Title on January 19, 2008 at Square Jungle's event Strong Soldiers' Conquest.

At Deep 35 Impact on May 19, 2008 at Korakuen Hall, Ichii defeated Japanese female MMA star Satoko Shinashi via majority decision, becoming just the second woman to defeat Shinashi.

On November 2, 2008 at Square Jungle's event Heisei Battle in the Square Jungle, Ichii defeated Megumi Watanabe by guillotine choke submission in 25 seconds.

Debuting with MMA promotion Jewels at Jewels 7th Ring on March 19, 2010, Ichii was defeated by Mika Nagano via unanimous decision.

At Jewels 8th Ring on May 23, 2010, Ichii was defeated by Saori Ishioka via armbar submission in the second round.

In her third straight loss, Ichii was defeated by South Korean kickboxer Seo Hee Ham via unanimous decision on July 31, 2010 at Jewels 9th Ring during the first round of the Jewels Lightweight Queen tournament.

After her losing streak, Ichii rebounded with a unanimous decision victory over Miyo Yoshida during the 2010 Jewels -52 kg Rough Stone GP semi-finals at Jewels 10th Ring on October 10, 2010.

Ichii faced Hiroko Kitamura in the finals of the 2010 Jewels -52 kg Rough Stone GP at Jewels 11th Ring on December 17, 2010. She was defeated by unanimous decision.

== Kickboxing career ==
Ichii debuted in kickboxing on March 9, 2007 at Kakidamishi 8: Ryukyu Muay Thai Kingdom, Takeoff! where she was defeated by Sakurako via majority decision.

Debuting in shoot boxing on November 24, 2008 at Shoot Boxing World Tournament 2008, Ichii was defeated by Fuka Kakimoto via extra round unanimous decision.

On December 21, 2008 at the Martial Arts Japan Kickboxing Federation event Break Through 8: Breach, Ichii fought to a majority draw against Mika Nagai.

Ichii obtained her first victory in kickboxing by defeating Tomoko SP via unanimous decision on March 1, 2009 at M-1 Freshmans.

On August 29, 2010 at Shoot Boxing World Tournament Girls S-cup 2010, Ichii defeated Sumie Yamada by majority decision in the tournament's reserve bout.

== Mixed martial arts record ==
Professional record breakdown
9 matches	4 wins	5 losses
By knockout	1	0
By submission	1	1
By decision	2	4

Res.	Record	Opponent	Method	Event	Date	Round	Time	Location	Notes
Loss	4-5-0	Hiroko Kitamura	Decision (0-3)	Jewels 11th Ring	December 17, 2010	2	5:00	Bunkyo, Tokyo, Japan	2010 Jewels -52 kg Rough Stone GP final
Win	4-4-0	Miyo Yoshida	Decision (3-0)	Jewels 10th Ring	October 10, 2010	2	5:00	Tokyo, Japan	2010 Jewels -52 kg Rough Stone GP semi-finals
Loss	3-4-0	Seo Hee Ham	Decision (0-3)	Jewels 9th Ring	July 31, 2010	2	5:00	Tokyo, Japan	Jewels Lightweight Queen tournament opening round
Loss	3-3-0	Saori Ishioka	Submission (armbar)	Jewels 8th Ring	May 23, 2010	2	2:41	Tokyo, Japan	
Loss	3-2-0	Mika Nagano	Decision (0-3)	Jewels 7th Ring	March 19, 2010	2	5:00	Tokyo, Japan	
Win	3-1-0	Megumi Watanabe	Submission (guillotine choke)	Square Jungle: Heisei Battle in the Square Jungle	November 2, 2008	1	0:25	Tokyo, Japan	Defended UKF Women's MMA Intercontinental Title
Win	2-1-0	Satoko Shinashi	Decision (2-0)	Deep: 35 Impact	May 19, 2008	2	5:00	Tokyo, Japan	
Win	1-1-0	Yukiko Seki	TKO (punches)	Square Jungle: Strong Soldiers' Conquest	January 19, 2008	2	3:14	Tokyo, Japan	For UKF Women's MMA Intercontinental Title
Loss	0-1-0	Emi Fujino	Decision (0-3)	Smackgirl 2006: Legend of Extreme Women	November 29, 2006	2	5:00	Tokyo, Japan	

== Kickboxing record ==
5 fights 2 wins 2 losses 1 draw
Result	Record	Opponent	Method	Event	Date	Round	Time	Location	Notes
Win	2-2-1	(Japan) Sumie Yamada	Decision (2-0)	Shoot Boxing World Tournament Girls S-cup 2010	August 29, 2010	3	2:00	Minato, Tokyo, Japan	Tournament reserve bout
Win	1-2-1	(Japan) Tomoko SP	Decision (3-0)	M-1 Freshmans	March 1, 2009	3	2:00	Koto, Tokyo, Japan
Draw	0-2-1	(Japan) Mika Nagai	Draw (0-1)	Break Through 8: Breach	December 21, 2008	3	2:00	Koto, Tokyo, Japan
Loss	0-2-0	(Japan) Fuka Kakimoto	Decision (0-3)	Shoot Boxing World Tournament 2008	November 24, 2008	3+1e	2:00	Saitama, Saitama Prefecture, Japan
Loss	0-1-0	(Japan) Sakurako	Decision (0-2)	Kakidamishi 8: Ryukyu Muay Thai Kingdom, Takeoff!	March 9, 2007	3	2:00	Naha, Okinawa Prefecture, Japan

Legend: Win Loss Draw/No contest

== Championships and accomplishments ==
=== Professional wrestling ===
- Ice Ribbon
  - International Ribbon Tag Team Championship (1 time) – with GENTARO

=== Mixed martial arts ===
- Universal Kickboxing Federation Women's MMA Intercontinental Championship

== See also ==
- List of female mixed martial artists
- List of female kickboxers
