= Mayra Conde =

Guatemalan martial artist

Mayra Lissette Conde
- Born: January 28, 1969 (age 57); Guatemala City, Guatemala
- Other names: The Strong Warrior
- Nationality: Guatemalan, German
- Height: 5 ft 4 in (1.63 m)
- Weight: 158 lb (72 kg; 11.3 st)
- Style: Brazilian jiu-jitsu, MMA, Kickboxing
- Fighting out of: The Beverly Hills Jiu-Jitsu Club

Mixed martial arts record
- Total: 20
- Wins: 18
- By knockout: 1
- By submission: 1
- Losses: 1
- Draws: 1
- No contests: 0

Mayra Lissette Conde (born January 28, 1969) is a professional Personal Trainer and mixed martial artist, who has also competed in bodybuilding, kickboxing and brazilian jiu-jitsu.

== Biography ==
Conde hails from Guatemala City, where she grew up on her grandparents' farm. She has spoken fondly of her time there in interviews, as well as citing her grandfather as "my source of strength". However, at the age of nine when her younger brother was born, Conde moved with her parents to Toronto, Ontario, Canada, hoping for a better education.

Her early years as an immigrant were tough; "I was constantly picked on because I couldn't speak English and was very small". Conde succeeded academically and became bilingual, speaking both her native Spanish and adopted English. While still at school, Conde developed an interest in sports drinks and nutrition through her father, which led to her becoming a bodybuilder at the age of 16. Her muscular physique proved useful when she moved into construction work after high school. Earning a living as a welder, she would later become a foreman. Meanwhile, she continued to attend fitness seminars and read health-related books.

In 1993, she met Zee Vjesalicu a wrestler, hockey player and mixed martial artist who introduced Conde and her friend Olga Bakalapolous to Brazilian Jui Jitusu. For a short period of time Zee trained Conde. Conde's first grappling competition, she won. In the summer of 1996, Conde moved to Los Angeles for the love of personal fitness training, and in search for something bigger and more challenging. She trained in Brazilian jiu-jitsu at the Beverly Hills Jiu Jitsu Club with such fighters including Mark Kerr and Bas Rutten. Learning from them and another trainer, Marcus Vinicius, she would later fight in the United States, Brazil and Greece and Japan, being part of the all-female "Hook N Shoot" Revolution promotion.

She was asked her to represent Team Canada at the 1st World Wide Pankration Championships on 11 November 2000, in Lamia, Greece. Despite a last minute notice and traveling at her own expense, she earned two gold medals. She was later invited to train with Coach Scott Miller and the Women's Wrestling Team at Pacific University in late 2002 and March 2003. Conde is a Purple Belt Brazilian Jiu-Jitsu Instructor, having studied under 4th Degree Black Belt Master Marcus Vinicius and Bas Rutten at The Beverly Hills Jiu Jitsu Club.

Conde is now living and working in Frankfurt am Main, Germany as a professional personal trainer. According to German authorities (in Frankfurt), she is the only foreign self-employed personal trainer authorized to live and work in Germany, without the need of an employer at first, due to the fact that she is a high level certified martial artist, instructor and personal trainer.

== Career ==
Mayra Lissette Conde started her Personal Training career in the 1990s, where she worked at The Workout in Toronto, Ontario, Canada.

In 1996 Conde moved to Los Angeles to pursue her bodybuilding dream and to enhance her Fitness Training career.

On 2003 Conde moved to Europe, mainly to get away from the competitive world of Full Contact Sports. On 2005 Conde started working full-time as a Personal Fitness Trainer in Frankfurt am Main, Germany.

Mayra Lissette Conde has been known as Canadian bodybuilder, who at 26 entered the world of Full Contact Fighting.

Currently, Conde is as a Personal Fitness Trainer and Martial Arts Instructor. Conde is also known as a being a Body Sculpting Specialist for 27 years. "Get in the best shape of your life faster than you thought..." is noted as being her slogan.

- 1st Place at the 3rd American International Championships, Grappling (148-160 lbs) Light Weight Division, Carson, CA, 9 December 2001
- 1st Place at the 3rd American International Championships, Brazilian Jiu Jitsu Women's Open Division, Carson, CA, 8 December 2001
- 1st Place in the US Open Brazilian Jiu Jitsu CHAMPIONSHIPS, October 2001
- 2001 Bronze Medalist in the World Wide Brazilian Jiu Jitsu Championships in Rio de Janeiro, Brazil (July 26–29 )
- Double GOLD Medalist in 1st World Wide Pankration Championships on 11 November 2000, Lamia, Greece
- 1st place winner in the Heavy weight & Open Division in the U.S. Open Brazilian Jiu Jitsu Championships in Santa Cruz, 5 November 2000
- Winner in NHB Bout at the Mark "The Cobra" Hall's Cobra Challenge Federation, in Anza CA on 3 June 2000
- 1st Place winner in the California State Brazilian Jiu Jitsu Championships, 26 March 2000
- U.S. Open Brazilian Jiu Jitsu Heavy Weight and Overall Winner, Santa Cruz (White Belt), 5 November 2000
- Won Cobra Challenge NHB fight, 6 March 2000
- Women's Kick-Boxing Division Winner, September 1999
- Women's Heavy Weight Grappler's Challenge Champion, August 1999
- Winner by technical K.O. in Kick-Boxing Bout at the Bas Rutten Invitational in Littleton CO, 26 June 1999
- Winner in NHB/Vale Tudo Bout at the 1st Bas Rutten Invitational, 6 February 1999
- 1st Place Women's Heavyweight Winner at the Grapplers Challenge in Toronto, Ontario, Canada on 8 August 1998
- Nite Magic Flexmania Ladies Overall (Bodybuilding), July 1996

== See also ==
- List of female mixed martial artists

== Mixed martial arts record ==
Professional record breakdown
4 matches	2 wins	1 loss
By knockout	1	0
By submission	1	1
Draws	1	

Res.	Record	Opponent	Method	Event	Date	Round	Time	Location	Notes
Loss	2-1-1	Yuuki Kubota	Submission (Armbar)	Smackgirl - Third Season 1	03/3/2003	1	2:20		
Draw	2-0-1	Angela Reestad		HOOKnSHOOT - Revolution	04/13/2002	2	5:00		
Win	2-0	Val Leota	Submission (Choke)	CFF - The Cobra Challenge 2000	06/3/2000	1	1:00		
Win	1-0	Kelsey Beard	TKO	BRI 1 - Bas Rutten Invitational 1	02/6/1999	1	N/A		
