= Becky Levi =

American martial artist

- Born: Coldwater, Michigan, U.S.
- Other names: The Specimen
- Height: 6 ft 0 in (1.83 m)
- Weight: 215 lb (98 kg; 15.4 st)
- Fighting out of: Tucson, Arizona, U.S.
- Rank: Second degree black belt in Judo

Mixed martial arts record
- Total: 8
- Wins: 7
- By knockout: 2
- By submission: 3
- By decision: 2
- Losses: 1
- By submission: 1

Other information
- Mixed martial arts record from Sherdog

Becky Levi is an American female mixed martial artist.

== Biography ==
Levi was born in Coldwater, Michigan. She began her training in Tucson, Arizona, training Judo with Steve Owen, a 7th degree black belt. She also continued her boxing training at two boxing facilities in Tucson. Becky was also a PE teacher and coach in Tucson for 11 years. She was involved in coaching the sports of volleyball, football, wrestling, and track and field. In 1998, she moved to Grand Ledge, Michigan. to pursue her fight career. Levi has wrestled and boxed at Joe Byrd's Boxing Academy for a year and a half hoping to get started in professional boxing. Although Becky did not get info boxing professionally, she did fight an exhibition fight in Toledo, Ohio. in 2002. Becky also holds a second-degree black belt in Judo. Prior to MMA competition, she was already an accomplished athlete. At the first 1987 Women's World Championships she won the plus 82 kilograms category in weightlifting. While studying at the University of Arizona, she became a discus thrower, winning the 1988 Tucson Elite Classic and becoming an alternate for the 1988 and 1992 Olympic teams. After graduating, she continued to succeed in the discus, winning the 1992 Willie Williams Classic. In 1991, she attempted judo competition, initially with less success, winning one match out of four at the 1991 Olympic Festival, but eventually becoming a national champion. The Arizona Daily Star called her "one of the two or three greatest female athletes produced here" in an article on the University of Arizona. Becky also competed in 4 World Tough Woman Championships: three of which she was runner up.

Her first entry into the world of mixed martial arts was as a strength and conditioning trainer to fellow Arizona resident Don Frye, present as part of his corner during Ultimate Fighting Championship 8, 9 and 10. In 1999, she helped set up The Danger Zone, a mixed martial arts promotion, with UFC Hall of Famer Dan Severn, who she had assisted in his preparation for UFC V. Severn would also train Levi for contests such as the Toughwoman World Championships, and said of her in a 1999 interview "She hits harder than most men." They parted ways in 2001 to pursue other business ventures.

Her last fight was a loss by flying armbar against Marloes Coenen at ReMix World Cup 2000, on 5 December 2000. Becky now is the fitness and sport performance co-director at Spiece Fitness a premier fitness facility in Ft. Wayne, IN. Becky has worked and developed their sport training and personal training programs since 2002. Becky is also involved in coaching the throwing events at Indiana Tech University in Fort Wayne, IN.

== Career ==
- 1981 National Junior College Champion Shot Put/Runner up discus
- 1982 National Junior College Champion Discus/Runner up shot put
- 1987 National Champion Women's Weightlifting 82 kg.+
- 1987 World Team Trial Champion Weightlifting 82 kg.+
- Pima College Track Hall of Fame Athlete
- USWF Superfight Champion
- L1 Superfight Champion
- IFC Super Heavyweight Champion
- Tough Woman World Champion 3 time Runner-up.

== Mixed martial arts record ==
Professional record breakdown
8 matches	7 wins	1 loss
By knockout	3	0
By submission	2	1
By decision	2	0

Res.	Record	Opponent	Method	Event	Date	Round	Time	Location	Notes
Loss	7–1	Marloes Coenen	Submission (flying armbar)	ReMix-World Cup 2000	December 5, 2000	1	1:25		
Win	7–0	Junko Yagi	Decision (unanimous)	ReMix-World Cup 2000	December 5, 2000	2	5:00		
Win	6–0	Miwako Ishihara	Decision (split)	ReMix-World Cup 2000	December 5, 2000	2	5:00		
Win	5–0	Terri Lukamski	TKO (punches)	LLPW-Ultimate L-1 Challenge	October 10, 1998	1	5:06		
Win	4–0	Javio Flores	Submission (choke)	WSW-World Shoot Wrestling	June 12, 1998	1	3:07		
Win	3–0	Leslie Brace	Submission (neck crank)	USWF 7-Unified Shoot Wrestling Federation 7	October 18, 1997	1	0:40		
Win	2–0	Betty Fagan	TKO (corner stoppage)	IFC 4-Akwesasane	March 28, 1997	1	1:44		
Win	1–0	Yoko Takahashi	TKO (submission to punches)	U-Japan	November 17, 1996	1	2:14		

== See also ==
- List of female mixed martial artists
