= Yuka Tsuji =

Japanese MMA fighter

- Born: December 11, 1974 (age 51); Osaka, Japan
- Other names: Vale Tudo Queen
- Nationality: Japanese
- Height: 1.56 m (5 ft 1 1/2 in)
- Weight: 115 lb (52 kg; 8.2 st)
- Division: Featherweight (52.2 kg – 56.7 kg) (Valkyrie); Lightweight (under 52 kg) (Smackgirl)
- Fighting out of: Osaka, Japan
- Team: Angura

Mixed martial arts record
- Total: 27
- Wins: 24
- By knockout: 2
- By submission: 16
- By decision: 6
- Losses: 3
- By submission: 3

Other information
- Mixed martial arts record from Sherdog

Medal record

Women's freestyle wrestling

Representing Japan

Asian Championships
Bronze medal – third place	1997 Taipei	-51kg

Yuka Tsuji (辻結花, Tsuji Yuka; born December 11, 1974) is a Japanese female mixed martial artist whose nickname is Vale Tudo Queen.

Tsuji was a prolific female mixed martial artist in the 2000s. Tsuji is a former Smackgirl tournament winner, Smackgirl Lightweight Champion and Valkyrie Featherweight Champion. MMA ranking system portal Fight Matrix ranked Tsuji as the No. 1 pound-for-pound Female Mixed Martial artist in the world in the years 2002, 2004 and 2005. Between 2002 and her retirement from MMA in 2012, she had frequently placed in the Top 5 of women's MMA fighters in flyweight and strawweight classes.

== Early life ==
Tsuji was born on December 11, 1974 in Hirakata, Osaka, Japan. She graduated from the prestigious Chukyo Women's University; a university notable for its wrestling family. During her time there, Tsuji placed third in Women's Freestyle Wrestling (51 kg) in the 1997 Asian Championship.

== Mixed martial arts career ==
Tsuji spent the majority of her career competing in the now-defunct Smackgirl promotion. She debuted with defunct promotion Ax on December 26, 2001 in the event Ax – Vol. 2: We Want To Shine with a victory by submission (armbar) over the previously undefeated Ikuma Hoshino, who at the time was the most accomplished female Japanese MMA fighter. This would be Hoshino's only loss in her MMA career.

Tsuji debuted in Smackgirl at Smackgirl – Royal Smack 2002 on April 7, 2002, defeating Hiromi Oka by submission due to a rear naked choke. Including her debut, Tsuji would go on a winning streak of 8 consecutive victories; in the process winning the Smackgirl Japan 2002 Cup Middleweight Tournament on June 28, 2005. In her ninth professional bout, she faced Brazilian fighter Ana Michelle Tavares. Tavares defeated Tsuji with a triangle armbar submission in Tsuji's debut for the Deep promotion at Deep – 11th Impact on July 13, 2003. In this match, Tsuji injured her left shoulder. This was Tsuji's first defeat in MMA. She avenged this loss years later.

After her first loss, Tsuji won her next four fights and then faced Hisae Watanabe at Smackgirl – Road to Dynamic!! for the first Smackgirl Lightweight Championship on June 28, 2005. Tsuji won the title after defeating Watanabe by armbar at 3:51 of the first round. She would go on to successfully defend the title five times until the demise of the Smackgirl promotion.

On September 6, 2007, Tsuji would get the chance to face Tavares again. At the event Smackgirl – Queens' Hottest Summer, Tsuji was able to avenge her only loss at the time by defeating Tavares via KO at 4:47 of the first round. After defending her title for the last time against South Korean Seo Hee Ham, Tsuji debuted in Valkyrie at the promotion's inaugural event Valkyrie 1 on November 8, 2008, where she defeated Mei Yamaguchi by decision. Tsuji became the first Valkyrie Featherweight Champion on April 25, 2009 by defeating American fighter Kate Martinez.

Her 14-fight winning streak came to an end on February 11, 2010 when she rematched Mei Yamaguchi, who this time was able to defeat Tsuji with a rear-naked choke in only 76 seconds. This was just the second time that Tsuji was defeated and the first time that she was defeated by a fellow Japanese fighter. This is considered one of the biggest upsets in the history of women's mixed martial arts.

Having recovered from surgery on her knee and shoulder, Tsuji returned to MMA in a Jewels vs. Valkyrie bout against Saori Ishioka at Jewels 15th Ring on July 9, 2011 in Tokyo, Japan. She defeated Ishioka by unanimous decision.

Tsuji faced Ayaka Hamasaki in a Jewels lightweight title fight at Jewels 19th Ring on May 26, 2012 in Osaka, Japan. She was defeated by submission due to a kimura in the first round.

On September 29, 2012, Tsuji faced Hyo Kyung Song at Deep Osaka Impact 2012. She defeated Song by technical submission due to an armbar in the first round.

== Mixed martial arts record ==
Professional record breakdown
27 matches	24 wins	3 losses
By knockout	2	0
By submission	16	3
By decision	6	0

Res.	Record	Opponent	Method	Event	Date	Round	Time	Location	Notes
Win	24–3	Hyo Kyung Song	Technical Submission (armbar)	Deep: Osaka Impact 2012	September 29, 2012	1	1:27	Osaka, Japan	
Loss	23–3	Ayaka Hamasaki	Submission (kimura)	Jewels 19th Ring	May 26, 2012	1	3:41	Osaka, Japan	For Jewels Lightweight (115 lbs) Queen Championship
Win	23–2	Saori Ishioka	Decision (unanimous)	Jewels 15th Ring	July 9, 2011	2	5:00	Tokyo, Japan	
Loss	22–2	Mei Yamaguchi	Submission (rear-naked choke)	Valkyrie 04	February 11, 2010	1	1:16	Tokyo, Japan	Lost Valkyrie Featherweight Championship
Win	22–1	Kate Martinez	Submission (armbar)	Valkyrie 02	April 25, 2009	1	4:20	Tokyo, Japan	Won inaugural Valkyrie Featherweight Championship
Win	21–1	Mei Yamaguchi	Decision (unanimous)	Valkyrie 01	November 8, 2008	3	3:00	Tokyo, Japan	
Win	20–1	Seo Hee Ham	Decision (unanimous)	Smackgirl – Starting Over	December 26, 2007	3	5:00	Tokyo, Japan	Defended Smackgirl Lightweight Championship
Win	19–1	Ana Michelle Tavares	TKO (punches)	Smackgirl – Queens' Hottest Summer	September 6, 2007	1	4:47	Tokyo, Japan	Non-title bout
Win	18–1	Thricia Poovey	TKO (punches)	Smackgirl – The Dance of the Taisho Romance	April 28, 2007	1	4:10	Osaka, Japan	Defended Smackgirl Lightweight Championship
Win	17–1	Tomomi Sunaba	Submission (rear-naked choke)	Smackgirl – Top Girl Battle	June 30, 2006	1	4:19	Tokyo, Japan	Defended Smackgirl Lightweight Championship in a "Winner Take All" match (Tsuji received both fight purses).
Win	16–1	Cami Hostetler	Submission (armbar)	Smackgirl – Queen's Triumphant Return	April 22, 2006	2	4:19	Osaka, Japan	Defended Smackgirl Lightweight Championship
Win	15–1	Miyuki Ariga	Submission (heel hook)	MARS	February 4, 2006	2	1:44	Tokyo, Japan	
Win	14–1	Maiko Ohkada	Submission (armbar)	Smackgirl – Dynamic!!	August 17, 2005	2	2:10	Tokyo, Japan	Defended Smackgirl Lightweight Championship
Win	13–1	Hisae Watanabe	Submission (armbar)	Smackgirl – Road to Dynamic!!	June 28, 2005	1	3:51	Tokyo, Japan	Won Smackgirl Lightweight Championship
Win	12–1	Erica Montoya	Submission (armbar)	Smackgirl – Holy Land Triumphal Return	August 5, 2004	3	4:00	Tokyo, Japan	
Win	11–1	Chiaki Kawabita	Submission (armbar)	Smackgirl – Go West	June 9, 2004	2	1:19	Osaka, Japan	
Win	10–1	Mayumi Hashiba	Submission (kneebar)	Smackgirl – F8	May 16, 2004	1	2:20	Tokyo, Japan	
Win	9–1	Kaliopi Yeitsuidou	Decision (unanimous)	Inoki Bom-Ba-Ye 2003	December 31, 2003	3	5:00	Kobe, Japan	
Loss	8–1	Ana Michelle Tavares	Submission (triangle armbar)	Deep – 11th Impact	July 13, 2003	1	3:55	Osaka, Japan	
Win	8–0	Tomomi Sunaba	Technical Submission (armbar)	Smackgirl – Third Season 2	April 2, 2003	1	4:37	Tokyo, Japan	
Win	7–0	Mari Kaneko	Decision (unanimous)	Smackgirl – Japan Cup 2002 Grand Final	December 29, 2002	3	5:00	Tokyo, Japan	Became 2002 Japan Cup Middleweight Tournament Champion
Win	6–0	Yumiko Sugimoto	Submission (armbar)	Smackgirl – Japan Cup 2002 Episode 2	November 9, 2002	1	4:13	Tokyo, Japan	
Win	5–0	Eri Takahashi	Submission (armbar)	Smackgirl – Japan Cup 2002 Opening Round	October 5, 2002	1	2:01	Tokyo, Japan	
Win	4–0	Noriko Tsunoda	Submission (armbar)	Smackgirl – Dynamic	September 1, 2002	1	1:12	Tokyo, Japan	
Win	3–0	Izumi Noguchi	Decision (split)	AX – Vol. 3	May 4, 2002	3	5:00	Tokyo, Japan	
Win	2–0	Hiromi Oka	Submission (rear-naked choke)	Smackgirl – Royal Smack 2002	April 7, 2002	1	3:43	Tokyo, Japan	
Win	1–0	Ikuma Hoshino	Submission (armbar)	AX – Vol. 2: We Want To Shine	December 26, 2001	3	3:37	Tokyo, Japan	

== Championships and accomplishments ==
- Bronze in Women's Freestyle Wrestling at 51 kg in the 1997 Asian Championship.
- 2002 JAPAN CUP middleweight tournament champion
- Inaugural Smackgirl Lightweight Champion (2005)
- Inaugural Valkyrie Featherweight Champion (2009)
- Fight Matrix
  - 2002 No. 1 Female Fighter of the Year
  - 2004 No. 1 Female Fighter of the Year
  - 2005 No. 1 Female Fighter of the Year

== See also ==
- List of female mixed martial artists
