= Jewels 10th Ring =

Mixed martial arts event in 2010

- The poster for Jewels 10th Ring
- Promotion: Jewels
- Date: October 10, 2010
- Venue: Shin-Kiba 1st Ring
- City: Koto, Tokyo, Japan
- Attendance: 464

Event chronology
Jewels 9th Ring	Jewels 10th Ring	Jewels 11th Ring

Jewels 10th Ring was a mixed martial arts (MMA) event held by MMA promotion Jewels. The event took place on October 10, 2010 at Shin-Kiba 1st Ring in Koto, Tokyo, Japan. It hosted the opening round of the second Rough Stone Grand Prix.

== Background ==
On August 21, 2010, Jewels announced that the event would begin the second Rough Stone Grand Prix.

The first fights were announced on September 10, 2010, along with the announcement that Seo Hee Ham's conflicting schedule led Jewels to release her. Ham's replacement was to be determined with the bout between Celine Haga and Saori Ishioka. More fights were announced on September 23, 2010.

Sixteen-year-old kickboxer Mizuki Inoue made her mixed martial arts debut on the card as part of the -56 kg bracket of the Rough Stone Grand Prix.

The weigh-ins were held one day prior to the event. It was later announced that Ham would return to Jewels in December to reclaim her place in the Lightweight Queen Tournament semi-final. As a result, the bout between Ishioka and Haga was changed to a regular match.

== Results ==
- Opening fight: Jewels amateur rules -48 kg bout, 4 min / 1 R

(Japan) Asami Higa (S-KEEP) vs. (Japan) Sachiko Togashi (TEAM ☆ SPIRITS)

Draw at 4:00 of round 1.

- 1st match: Jewels official rules -52 kg bout, 5 min / 2 R

(Japan) Saori Ishioka (51.8 kg (114 lb), Zendokai Koganei) vs. (Norway) Celine Haga (51.8 kg (114 lb), Hellboy Hansen MMA)

Ishioka defeated Haga by decision (3-0).

- 2nd match: Jewels grappling rules -52 kg, 1 day tournament semi-finals, 4 min / 2R

(Japan) Yuko Oya (51.9 kg (114 lb), DEEP Official Gym Impact) vs. (Japan) Asami Kodera (51.2 kg (113 lb), Purebred Kawaguchi Redips)

Oya defeated Kodera by submission (armbar) at 2:22 of round 2.

- 3rd match: Jewels grappling rules -52 kg, 1 day tournament semi-finals, 4 min / 2R

(Japan) Emi Tomimatsu (51.5 kg (114 lb), Paraestra Matsudo) vs. (Japan) Ayaka Hamasaki (51.9 kg (114 lb), Abe Ani Combat Club)

Hamasaki defeated Tomimatsu by submission (armbar) at 2:34 of round 2.

- 4th match: Rough Stone GP 2010 -56 kg semi-finals, Jewels official rules, 5 min / 2 R

(Japan) Asako Saioka (55.2 kg (122 lb), U-File Camp Gifu) vs. (Japan) Harumi (55.9 kg (123 lb), Blue Dog Gym)

Saioka defeated Harumi by KO (punch) at 2:31 of round 1.

- 5th match: Rough Stone GP 2010 -56 kg semi-finals, Jewels official rules, 5 min / 2 R

(Japan) Emi Murata (55.0 kg (121.3 lb), Abe Ani Combat Club) vs. (Japan) Mizuki Inoue (55.0 kg (121.3 lb), Karate-do Shiro Shin-kai)

Inoue defeated Murata by submission (armbar) at 2:58 of round 2.

- 6th match: Rough Stone GP 2010 -48 kg semi-finals, Jewels official rules, 5 min / 2 R

(Japan) Kikuyo Ishikawa (47.5 kg (105 lb), Reversal Gym Yokohama Ground Slam) vs. (Japan) Misaki Ozawa (48.0 kg (105.8 lb), Zendokai Matsumoto)

Ishikawa defeated Ozawa by submission (armbar) at 2:24 of round 1.

- 7th match: Rough Stone GP 2010 -48 kg semi-finals, Jewels official rules, 5 min / 2 R

(Japan) Yukiko Seki (46.7 kg (103 lb), Fight Chix) vs. (Japan) Yoko Kagoshima (48.0 kg (105.8 lb), Shinagawa CS)

Seki defeated Kagoshima by decision (3-0).

- 8th match: Rough Stone GP 2010 -52 kg semi-finals, Jewels official rules, 5 min / 2 R

(Japan) Hiroko Kitamura (51.6 kg (114 lb), Zendokai Koganei) vs. (Japan) Rina Tomita (51.3 kg (113 lb), Abe Ani Combat Club)

Kitamura defeated Tomita by decision (3-0).

- 9th match: Rough Stone GP 2010 -52 kg semi-finals, Jewels official rules, 5 min / 2 R

(Japan) Mai Ichii (51.1 kg (113 lb), Ice Ribbon) vs. (Japan) Miyo Yoshida (51.3 kg (113 lb), freelancer)

Ichii defeated Yoshida by decision (3-0).

- 10th match: Jewels grappling rules -52 kg, 1 day tournament final, 4 min / 2R

(Japan) Yuko Oya (51.9 kg (114 lb), DEEP Official Gym Impact) vs. (Japan) Ayaka Hamasaki (51.9 kg (114 lb), Abe Ani Combat Club)

Hamasaki defeated Oya by submission (armbar) at 2:45 of round 1.

- 11th match: Shoot boxing rules -53 kg bout, 2 min / 3 R (extension 2 R)

(Japan) Sakura Nomura (53.0 kg (116.8 lb), Club Barbarian Impact) vs. (Japan) Yoshimi Ohama (52.9 kg (117 lb), NJKF / Inspired Motion)

Nomura defeated Ohama by unanimous decision (30-27, 30-27, 30-27).

- 12th match: Jewels official rules -58 kg bout, 5 min / 2 R

(Japan) Miki Morifuji (57.1 kg (126 lb), T-Blood) vs. (Japan) Aya Koyama (55.9 kg (123 lb), Fight Chix)

Morifuji defeated Koyama by submission (rear naked choke) at 1:51 of round 1.
