= Takaoka University of Law =

Coordinates: 36°40′10.3″N 137°0′4.7″E

Takaoka University of Law (高岡法科大学, Takaoka hōka daigaku) is a private university in Takaoka, Toyama, Japan. The predecessor of the school was founded in 1959, and it was chartered as a university in 1989. In 2024, the university announced it would stop enrolling from 2025 and would be closed in 2028.
