= Keiko Tamai =

Japanese martial artist

- Born: January 6, 1982 (age 44); Tatebayashi, Gunma, Japan
- Other names: Tama-Chan
- Nationality: Japanese
- Height: 5 ft 5 in (1.65 m)
- Weight: 143 lb (65 kg; 10.2 st)
- Style: Kickboxing

Mixed martial arts record
- Total: 31
- Wins: 16
- By knockout: 1
- By submission: 7
- By decision: 8
- Losses: 15
- By submission: 9
- By decision: 6

Other information
- Mixed martial arts record from Sherdog

Keiko Tamai (born January 6, 1982) is a Japanese mixed martial arts fighter. She is known for her flamboyant ring attire and personality.

== Mixed martial arts record ==
Professional record breakdown
28 matches	14 wins	14 losses
By knockout	1	1
By submission	5	9
By decision	8	4

Res.	Record	Opponent	Method	Event	Date	Round	Time	Location	Notes
Loss	14-14	Shayna Baszler	Submission (neck crank)	ShoXC: Elite Challenger Series	April 5, 2008	1	2:05		
Loss	14-13	Marloes Coenen	Submission (rear naked choke)	K: GRACE 1	May 27, 2007	1	2:01		
Loss	14-12	Michiko Takeda	Decision (unanimous)	Smackgirl-Will The Queen Paint The Shinjuku Skies Red?	March 11, 2007	2	5:00		
Win	14-11	Jan Finney	Submission (armbar)	BodogFIGHT Costa Rica01	February 16, 2007	2	3:01		
Win	13-11	Mamiko Mamiko	Submission (armbar)	G-Shooto: G-Shooto Special03	November 19, 2006	1	1:10		
Loss	12-11	Hitomi Akano	Submission (armbar)	MARS-bodogFIGHT 01	October 4, 2006	2	4:48		
Win	12-10	Kamei Natsuko	Submission (armbar)	Smackgirl-Women Hold Their Ground	September 15, 2006	1	3:13		
Loss	11-10	Megumi Fujii	Submission (armbar)	Smackgirl-Top Girl Battle	June 30, 2006	1	0:53		
loss	11-9	Natsuko Kikukawa	TKO	Smackgirl-Go West	June 9, 2004	1	1:13		
Loss	11-8	Roxanne Modafferi	Decision (unanimous)	GCM-Cross Section 1	April 18, 2004	2	5:00		
win	11-7	Hikaru Shinohara	Decision (unanimous)	Smackgirl-Third Season 5	August 30, 2003	2	5:00		
Win	10-6	Lee Hee-Jin	TKO	Smackgirl-Advent of Goddess	February 15, 2006	2	1:48		
Loss	9-6	Hitomi Akano	Submission (armbar)	G-Shooto: G-Shooto 03	December 17, 2005	1	1:27		
Win	9-5	Yumiko Sugimoto	Decision (unanimous)	G-Shooto: Plus04	November 11, 2005	2	5:00		
Win	8-5	Kumiko Maekawa	Decision (unanimous)	Smackgirl: Dynamic!!	August 17, 2005	2	5:00		
Win	7-5	Ha Na Kim	Decision (unanimous)	Smackgirl: KOREA 2005	May 21, 2005	2	5:00		
Win	6-5	Hikaru Shinohara	Submission (armbar)	TRIBELATE: vol. 6	April 25, 2005	2	0:00		
Win	5-5	Hari Hari	Decision (unanimous)	Smackgirl: Niigata Revival Festival 2005	April 10, 2005	2	5:00		
Win	4-5	Yuiga Yuiga	Decision (unanimous)	Smackgirl: Refresh 2005	January 8, 2005	2	5:00		
Loss	3-5	Kaoru Ito	Technical Submission (armbar)	Smackgirl: World ReMix	December 19, 2004	1	3:45		
Loss	3-4	Akino Akino	Decision (split)	Smackgirl: Holy Land Triumphal Return	August 5, 2004	2	5:00		
Win	3-3	Natsuko Kikukawa	Decision (unanimous)	Smackgirl-Third Season 5	July 6, 2003	2	5:00		
Loss	2-3	Yuiga Yuiga	Submission (choke)	Smackgirl-Third Season 3	May 7, 2003	1	4:27		
win	2-2	Kazue Terui	Decision	Smackgirl-Third Season 1	March 3, 2003	2	3:00		
Loss	1-2	Yuuki Kondo	Decision	Japan Cup 2002 Grand Final	December 29, 2002	3	5:00		
Loss	1-1	Mika Harigae	Submission (armbar)	Smackgirl-Japan Cup 2002 Episode 2	November 9, 2002	1	2:52		
Win	1-0	Etsuko Kato	Submission (armbar)	AX-Vol. 5	July 26, 2002	2	1:11		

== See also ==
- List of female mixed martial artists
