= Shaianna Rincon =

American mixed martial arts (MMA) fighter

- Born: August 21, 1993 (age 33); Vacaville, California, United States
- Other names: Yaya
- Nationality: American
- Height: 5 ft 5 in (165 cm)
- Division: Featherweight
- Team: Combat Sports Academy
- Years active: 2017 - present

Mixed martial arts record
- Total: 3
- Wins: 2
- By knockout: 1
- By decision: 1
- Losses: 1
- By decision: 1

Other information
- Mixed martial arts record from Sherdog

Shaianna Rincon (born August 21, 1993) is an American mixed martial artist who last competed in the featherweight division of the Invicta Fighting Championships.

== Mixed martial arts career ==
=== Invicta Fighting Championships ===
Rincon made her Invicta debut on March 28, 2018, against Brooksie Bayard on May 17, 2017, at Invicta FC 23: Porto vs. Niedźwiedź. She won the fight via unanimous decision.

Her next fight came on August 31, 2017, facing Courtney King, replacing Stephanie Egger, at Invicta FC 25: Kunitskaya vs. Pa'aluhi. She won the fight via technical knockout in round two.

On November 1, 2019, Rincon faced Auttumn Norton at Invicta FC 38: Murata vs. Ducote. She lost the fight unanimous decision.

== Mixed martial arts record ==
Professional record breakdown
3 matches	2 wins	1 loss
By knockout	1	0
By submission	0	0
By decision	1	1

Res.	Record	Opponent	Method	Event	Date	Round	Time	Location	Notes
Loss	2–1	Auttumn Norton	Decision (unanimous)	Invicta FC 38: Murata vs. Ducote	November 1, 2019	3	5:00	Kansas City, Kansas, United States	
Win	2–0	Courtney King	TKO (punches)	Invicta FC 25: Kunitskaya vs. Pa'aluhi	August 31, 2017	2	3:41	Kansas City, Kansas, United States	Featherweight debut.
Win	1–0	Brooksie Bayard	Decision (unanimous)	Invicta FC 23: Porto vs. Niedźwiedź	May 17, 2017	3	5:00	Kansas City, Missouri, United States	Bantamweight debut.

== See also ==
- List of current Invicta FC fighters
