= Cristiana Stancu =

Romanian martial artist

Christiana Mongol Budica
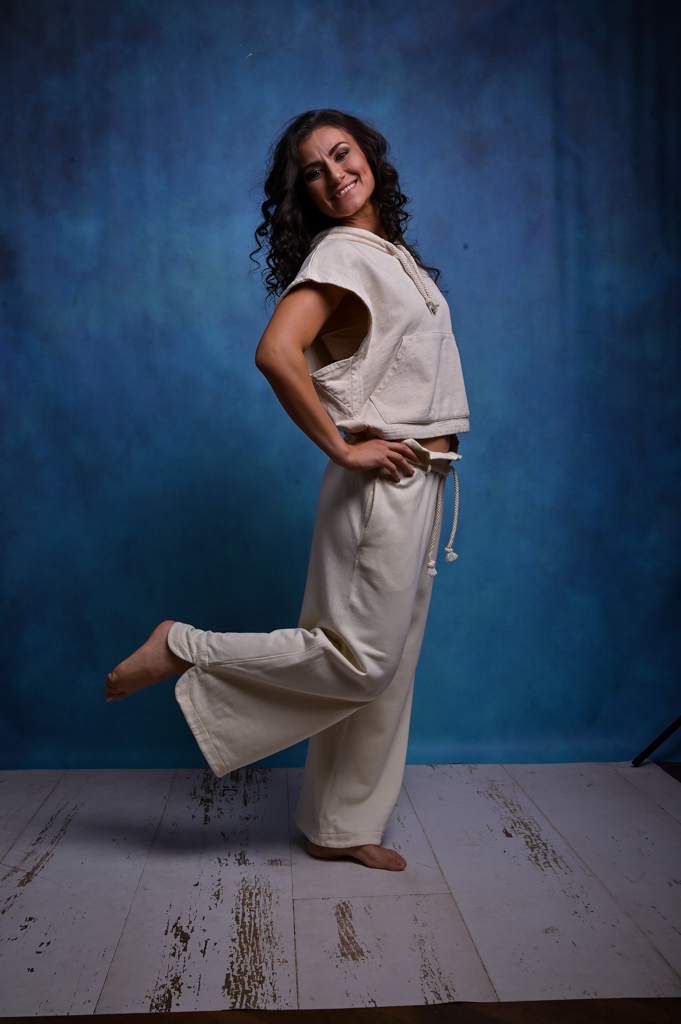
- Christiana Mongol, World Kickboxing Champion, MMA Fighter, Painter.
- Born: Cristiana-Mihaela Stancu; July 19, 1991 (age 35); Romania
- Other names: Mongol
- Nationality: Romanian
- Height: 174 cm (5 ft 9 in)
- Weight: 64.0 kg (141 lb; 10 st 1 lb)
- Division: Lightweight
- Style: Kyokushin karate, kempo, Sanda, boxing, kickboxing, MMA,
- Fighting out of: Bucharest, Romania
- Team: Mongol Team
- Rank: 1st dan black belt in kempo awarded by Yoshiji Soeno; 1st dan black belt in Taekwondo awarded by Chang Ung; 1st dan black belt in Karatedo awarded by FRK; 3rd dan black belt in kempo awarded by Amatto Zaharia; 1st kyu brown belt in Kyokushin awarded by Loek Hollander; 1st kyu brown belt in Sei Budokai awarded by Leonardo Voinescu

Kickboxing record
- Total: 13
- Wins: 10
- By knockout: 3
- Losses: 3
- By knockout: 0

Mixed martial arts record
- Total: 4
- Wins: 3
- By knockout: 1
- By submission: 1
- Losses: 0
- By knockout: 0
- By submission: 0
- Draws: 1
- No contests: 0

Other information
- Occupation: fighter & artist
- University: Sacred Art at Faculty of Orthodox Theology
- Spouse: Octavian Budica
- Last updated on: 28 February 2015

Christiana "Mongol" Budica born Stancu (July 19, 1991) is a Romanian mixed martial artist, karateka, boxer and kickboxer.

== Early life ==
Christiana was raised in Bucharest, Romania, born from a professional bowling player (mother) and a jujitsu martial artist (father). She had an early start in both martial arts and painting, her second profession, when her parents observed her talents since she was only three years old. She began her career in combat sports at age 9 while painting in the same complex in the capital, the father of one of her colleagues painting being a martial arts coach. She retired from her Kyokushin karate career after 9 glamorous years, to begin developing in the art of Kempo, and then start her Kickboxing and MMA career, being the first woman in Romania to ever enter a cage and win and international World Title under Igor Vovchanchyn. Later, Christiana would also pursue her boxing career.

== Fighting career ==
=== Kyokushin & Sei Budokai career ===
  - 2004 Kyokushin National Championship in Bucharest, Romania -45 kg Silver Medalist (silver)
  - 2005 Sei Budokai National Championship in Bucharest, Romania -45 kg Gold Medalist (gold)
  - 2006 Sei Budokai International Cup in Constanta, Romania -55 kg Gold Medalist (gold)
  - 2006, 2007, 2008 Sei Budokai National Championship in Bucharest Romania -55 kg Gold Medalist (gold)
  - 2007 Kyokushin National Championship Kumite & Kata in Bucharest, Romania -55 kg Gold Medalist (gold)
  - 2007 Kyokushin World Women's Championships in Chiba, Japan -55 kg 8th place
  - 2008 Kyokushin National Championship Kumite in Bucharest, Romania -60 kg Gold Medalist (gold)
  - 2008 Kyokushin National Championship Kata in Constanta, Romania Silver Medalist (silver)
  - 2008 European Kyokushin Championships in Varna, Bulgaria Bronze Medalist (bronze)
  - 2009 Kyokushin National Championship Kumite in Bucharest Romania -65 kg Gold Medalist (gold)
  - 2009 World Women's Championships Kyokushin Karate in Chiba, Japan

=== Kickboxing career ===
==== SUPERKOMBAT Fighting Championship career ====
On February 26, 2015 it was announced that will compete in the first ever women's fight in SUPERKOMBAT history, bout scheduled March 7 against Annalisa Bucci at SUPERKOMBAT World Grand Prix I 2015 in Ploiești, Romania.

== Championships and accomplishments ==
=== Boxing ===
- European Amateur Boxing Championships
  - 2014 Women's European Amateur Boxing Championships in Bucharest, Romania win to Guerrier Erika France and Apetz Nadine Germany, lost to Elena Vystropova -69 kg Bronze Medalist (bronze)
- World Amateur Boxing Championships
  - 2014 AIBA Women's World Boxing Championships in Jeju, South Korea -69 kg

=== Wushu ===
- World Wushu Championships
  - 2015 World Wushu Championships in Jakarta, Indonesia -70 kg Bronze Medalist (bronze)

=== Mixed martial arts ===
- International Kempo Federation
  - 2015 Kempo Individual World Championship in Antalya, Turkey -65 kg Gold Medalist (gold)
  - 2015 Kempo World Championships Forms, Kata in Antalya, Turkey Silver Medalist (silver)
  - 2015 Kempo & WAC PRO ALLStyles BELT Women's World Championship in Vagos, Portugal -64 kg Gold Medalist (gold)
  - 2014 IKF & FILA European Pankration Championships in Bucharest, Romania Silver Medalist (silver)
  - 2013 Shidokan & Kempo World Championships in Tokyo, Japan Bronze Medalist (bronze)
  - 2012 IKF World MMA Championship in Tallinn, Estonia Semi-Professional Gold Medalist (gold)
  - 2012 9th IKF World Kempo Championships in Antalya, Turkey -60 kg Gold Medalist (gold)
  - 2012 IKF World Kempo Teams Championships in Torres Novas, Portugal Gold Medalist (gold)
  - 2011 IKF World Kempo Teams Championships in Antalya, Turkey Gold Medalist (gold)
  - 2011 1st IKF European Kempo MMA Championships in Yalta, Ukraine -65 kg Gold Medalist (gold)
  - 2010 IKF World Kempo Championships in Antalya, Turkey Full-Contact Gold Medalist (gold)
  - 2010 IKF World Kempo MMA Championships Gold Medalist (gold)

== MMA record ==
3 Wins, 1 Draw
Professional record
Date	Result	Opponent	Event	Location	Method	Round	Time
2015-11-28	draw	(Croatia) Maja Britvic	SUPERKOMBAT World Grand Prix 2015	Turin, Italy	Decision (unanimous)	3	5:00
2012-05-26	Win	(Italy) Valentina Borgognoni	WMMAF World Championship	Tallinn, Estony	TKO	2	5:00
2012-07-27	Win	(Bulgaria) Jaqueline Ivanova	The battle for Russe	Russe, Bulgaria	TKO	1	3:00
2011-06-25	Win	(Romania) Baba Gabriela	Kempo MMA	Romania	Decision (2:1)	3	3:00
Legend: Win Loss Draw/No contest Notes

== Kickboxing record ==
10 Wins, 3 Loss
Professional record
Date	Result	Opponent	Event	Location	Method	Round	Time
2021-24-09	Win	(Russia) Maria Scopinova	Fight4KO World Tournament World Muay Thay Title	Antalya, Turkey	Unanimous Decision	3	3:00
2018-12-14	Loss	(Italy) Cristina Carusso	COLOSSEUM TOURNAMENT WAKO ORG IX	Timișoara, Romania	Split Decision	5	3:00
2018-09-17	Win	(Netherlands) Ibtissam Kassrioui	COLOSSEUM TOURNAMENT VIII	Bucharest, Romania	Split Decision	3	3:00
2018-05-24	Win	(Netherlands) Marleen Okx	COLOSSEUM TOURNAMENT TITANS BALKANS TITLE WMF & EUROPEAN TITLE EMC PRO	Bucharest, Romania	KO	2	2:04
2018-02-23	Win	(Greece) Katerina Abdalla	COLOSSEUM TOURNAMENT "THE BATTLE DANUBIUS"	Galati, Romania	TKO	1	1:30
2015-10-02	Loss	(United States) Angela Whitley	SUPERKOMBAT WORLD GRAND PRIX 2016	Puerto Rico, USA	TKO	3	3:00
2015-10-02	Win	(Italy) Irene Martens	SUPERKOMBAT- WTKA World Title and WKA Intercontinental Title 2015	Milan, Italy	Decision (unanimous)	3	3:00
2015-08-01	Win	(Italy) Jessica Puglisi	SUPERKOMBAT World Grand Prix IV 2015	Constanța, Romania	Decision (unanimous)	3	3:00
2015-05-23	Win	(Turkey) Songül Yılmaz	SUPERKOMBAT World Grand Prix II 2015	Bucharest, Romania	Decision (unanimous)	3	3:00
2015-03-07	Loss	(Italy) Annalisa Bucci	SUPERKOMBAT World Grand Prix I 2015	Ploiești, Romania	Decision	3	3:00
2013-04-06	Win	(Romania) Alina Georgescu	KING AUTO CUP 2013	Bucharest, Romania	Decision (unanimous)	3	3:00
2012-07-28	Win	(Romania) Radovicescu Georgiana	FIGHTING SPORT REVOLUTION	Ilfov, Romania	Decision (2:1)	3	3:00
2012-03-17	Win	(Romania) Alice Ardelean	KICKBOXING CHALLENGE	Sfantu Gheorghe, Romania	Decision (unanimous)	3	3:00
SUPERKOMBAT debut.
Legend: Win Loss Draw/No contest Notes

== Life ==
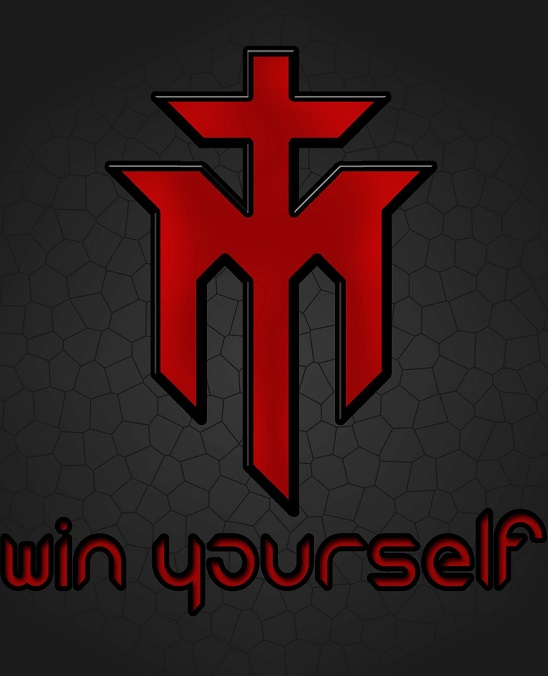
WIN YOURSELF

She's specialist in iconography. Some of her icons were sold over a thousand euros.

Christiana took part in several kyokushin and kempo events in Japan, where she met Ray Sefo, Jayson Vemoa or the coaches of Francisco Filho and Glaube Feitosa becoming friends with all and learning from them. Her models are Benny Urquidez, Chuck Norris, Fedor Emelianenko. Portuguese champion José (Zé) Fortes also educated her on Muay Thai.

== Other ==
- Journalism

Along with her spouse, Christiana has created the Societies Magazine, a cultural magazine in Romania, with a general view over the Romanian society and the foreign societies Romania is interacting. Also, she is the general editor for Sport Revolution Magazine, the best sports magazine in Romania.

Asian Games, Turkmenistan 2017. Christiana was a special reporter for the Indoor and Martial Arts Games, held in Ashgabad, Turkmenistan.

- Motivational Speeches

She has been invited to speak in different events where she spoke about her experiences in life and sport. Since 2015, she has participated in TEDxTalks and has worked as a professional speaker, combining her background from different fields with her intellectual concerns.

- Painting

She became a graduate in theology, Sacred Art, Iconographic Painting, with the work "The three ways of worship of the Holy Apostle and Evangelist Luke", for which she obtained the grade A. She supports her sports activity by painting, her works being sold in her native country and abroad. In 2022 she opened her first personal painting exhibition called "One way" having an amazing critics review and selling all her paintings

- Prizes

-2015 Sports Person in Romania, awarded by Alexandrion Group

-2015 The Person of the Year in Sports, awarded by Cotidianul

-2016 Woman of the year, awarded by Lady Gala

-2018 Woman of the Year in Sports, awarded by DeBizz

-2018 Best Pro Fighter, awarded by DSTB

-2020 The Jury's Choice Special Prize Woman of the Year by Lumina International and FUNDATIA PRETUIESTE VIATA

-2021 Best Fighter Fihgt4KO IFMA Turkey, awarded Mali Production

-2021 Best Pro Fighter Thaiboxing Fight4KO WMC Thailand

- Filmography

She is noticed by the world of cinema, and in 2015 she films her first action role, the first music video in which she is the protagonist and obtains a contract as a stunt double for the main actress in an international film. In 2021, together with her husband, the historian and sports journalist, Octavian Budică, she is filming an independent project, Ter Chono - a Mongolian story, a short historical film that managed to collect international awards all over the world, in which Christiana plays the main role, that of the Mongolian warrior princess, Ter Chono. The film is based on an idea by Octavian Budică, who also produced the movie.

- Prizes

-2022 World Premiere at Buffalo International Film Festival New York, USA

-2022 Best Short Movie, awarded by Centre Film Festival Pennsylvania, USA

-2022 Best Director, awarded by Ideal Film Festival India

-2022 Best Actress, awarded by Ideal Film Festival India

-2022 Best Short nominee, awarded by Weyauwega International Film Festival Wisconsin, USA

-2023 Best Director nominee by Wyoming International Film Festival Wyoming, USA

-2023 Best Shorts nominee by Maryland international Film Festival Maryland, USA

-2023 Best Actress nominee by Flowers Against Bullets Film Festival Wien, Austria

== See also ==
- List of female kickboxers
