= Julie Kitchen =

English kickboxer

- Born: 19 April 1977 (age 49); Penzance, Cornwall, England, United Kingdom
- Other names: The Queen of Muay Thai
- Height: 1.80 m (5 ft 11 in)
- Weight: 59 kg (130 lb; 9.3 st)
- Style: Muay Thai, kickboxing
- Stance: Orthodox
- Fighting out of: Penzance, England
- Team: Touchgloves Gym
- Trainer: Nathan Kitchen
- Years active: 2002–2012

Kickboxing record
- Total: 61
- Wins: 51
- Losses: 9
- No contests: 1
- Last updated on: 8 September 2014

Julie Kitchen (born 19 April 1977) is an English sports commentator, retired kickboxer and Muay Thai fighter.

== Early life ==
Julie Kitchen was born at Truro Hospital to parents Ivor and Lynn Barrett, as the middle child of three daughters. Between the ages of six and eleven she attended St. Paul's School in Penzance, Cornwall. She was a shy child making very few friends and was content with family life. Her family was very close and she played the role of a second mother to her younger sister. At the age of eleven she decided to become a vegetarian because she did not like the taste of meat. She remains a vegetarian to this day, but now includes fish into her diet.

At the age of twelve she started at Humphry Davy School in Penzance where she continued to find socialising uncomfortable due to shyness. Although she did not like school, she enjoyed the subjects of Art, Mathematics and Physical Education. During this time she began to excel at the sports of hockey, netball and athletics.

In 1989 she enrolled in the Sea Cadets, and by the time she was sixteen had worked her way up the ranks to Petty Officer. She was awarded the honour of Lord Lieutenant's Cadet. Before leaving the Sea Cadets in 1993 she had considered working her way into teaching in the Navy. Julie Kitchen attributes the Sea Cadets has a major part of overcoming her shyness.

In 1993, at the age of sixteen, she went on to study a Leisure and Tourism course at Penwith College after finishing school and leaving the Sea Cadets. In this year she met her future husband, and coach Nathan Kitchen.

On 26 February 1999 she gave birth to twin daughters. Shortly after the birth of the twins, at the age of twenty-four, she joined Touchgloves Gym in Penzance to lose weight.

== Career ==
Julie Kitchen won her professional debut in March 2002 against Diane Fletcher from Liverpool, England.

During her career she faced fighters from fifteen countries. She was the first British woman to win a WBC title.

Her last fight was in Los Angeles, California against British fighter Amanda Kelly on 12 January 2012. She lost via split decision after five rounds. She officially retired later that month.

== Championships and awards ==
=== Titles ===
- World Boxing Council Muaythai
  - 2011 WBC Welterweight World Champion
- International Kickboxing Federation
  - 2010 International Kickboxing Federation (IKF) World Super Lightweight Muay Thai Champion
  - 2010 International Kickboxing Federation (IKF) World Champion, 62.2 kg
  - 2005 International Kickboxing Federation (IKF) Amateur Muay Thai Rules Super Lightweight British Champion, 63 kg
- Backstreet Brawler & Top King
  - 2010 World Champion, 63.5 kg (Two time)
- World Muaythai Council
  - 2009 WMC World Champion, 63 kg (Two time)
- International Sport Karate Association
  - 2009 ISKA World Champion, −66 kg
  - 2008 ISKA World Champion, −64 kg
- World Professional Muaythai Federation
  - 2009 WPMF World Champion, 67 kg
  - 2009 WPMF World Champion, 65 kg
- Women's International Kickboxing Association
  - 2008 WIKBA Intercontinental Champion, 63 kg
  - 2006 WIKBA World Champion, 61.5 kg (Two time)
- International MuayThai and Kickboxing Organisation
  - 2007 IMKO European Champion, 63 kg
- NMF/ITMF
  - 2008 NMF/ITMF World Champion, 65 kg
- Capital Punishment
  - 2006 Capital Punishment World Champion, 61.5 kg
- World Professional Kickboxing League
  - 2005 WPKL British Champion, 63 kg
- World Kickboxing Association
  - 2005 WKA British Champion, 63 kg
  - 2004 WKA British Champion, 59 kg

=== Other titles ===
  - 2007 Golden Belt European Champion, 61.5 kg
  - 2006 BKK Female British Junior Welterweight Champion, 63.5 kg
  - 2005 BMBC English Champion, 60 kg
  - 2005 FIST British Champion, 63 kg (1 defence)
  - 2004 BKK British Champion, 63 kg

=== Awards ===
- Awakening Fighters
  - 2012 AOCA / Awakening Outstanding Contribution Award

=== Other awards ===
  - 2011 Pride of Cornwall Award (The first ever female to win this award)
  - 2011 Fighters Hall of Fame / Best Female Martial Artist
- International Sport Kickboxing Association
  - 2010 ISKA Fighter of the Year
  - 2009 ISKA Fighter of the Year

== After retirement ==
Julie Kitchen is a sports commentator for the kickboxing promotion Enfusion.

== Kickboxing record ==
Kickboxing Record (incomplete)
51 Wins ( (T)KO, decisions), 9 Loss, 1 Draws
Date	Result	Opponent	Event	Location	Method	Round	Time	Record
12 January 2012	Loss	(Scotland) Amanda Kelly	In Honor of the King, Playa Vista	(United States) Los Angeles, California	Decision (Split)			
Julie Kitchens retirement fight
18 August 2012	Loss	(United States) Miriam Nakamoto		Pala Casino, San Diego, California, United States	Decision (Unanimous)	3		
Fought for WCK World title
11 March 2012	Win	(Netherlands) Aleide Lawant	Call Of Duty	Pool, United Kingdom	Decision (Unanimous)	5	3:00	
Fought for WPMF World title
30 December 2011	NC	(Canada) Maria Bastasin	Enfusion: Quest for Honour	Prague, Czech Republic	No contest (cut by clash of heads)	1	0:15	
6 November 2011	Win	(Canada) Sandra Bastian	MuayThai Premier League: Blood & Steel	Netherlands	Points	3	3:00	
2 September 2011	Win	(Czech Republic) Martina Jindrová	MuayThai Premier League: Stars and Stripes	Los Angeles, California, United States	Decision (Unanimous)	3	3:00	
7 April 2011	Win	(Thailand) Nan Pimnipa		Pattaya, Thailand	TKO (knee to the body and elbow)	3	N/A	
Fought for WBC Welterweight title
2 October 2010	Win	(Italy) Annalisa Bucci	MT England vs Italy	Blackpool, England, United Kingdom	Decision	5	3:00	
Fought for MTEC World title
9 May 2010	Win	(Luxembourg) Claire Haigh		Cornwall, England, United Kingdom	Decision (Split)	3	3:00	
Fought for IKF World title
5 December 2009	Win	(Luxembourg) Claire Haigh	Kings Cup Tournament	Bangkok, Thailand	Points	5	3:00	
13 September 2009	Win	(New Zealand) Karen Lynch	Muay Thai Addicts II	London, England, United Kingdom	Decision (Unanimous)	5	3:00	
26 July 2009	Win	(United States) Natalie Fuz		Cornwall, England, United Kingdom	Decision (Unanimous)	5	3:00	
Fought for ISKA World title
26 June 2009	Win	(United States) Angela Rivera-Parr		Kingston, Jamaica	Decision (Unanimous)			
For World Muaythai Council Lightweight Championship & ISKA World title.
8 April 2009	Win	(Italy) Chantal Ughi		Bangkok, Thailand	Points	5	2:00	
Fought for WPMF Title
1 March 2009	Win	(Scotland) Paula Wilkie	Sportfight Scotland & Ireland Show	(Republic of Ireland) Oranmore, Ireland	TKO	5	N/A	
Fought for WPMF Title
7 December 2008	Win	(Portugal) Ivanilda vaz Te		Cornwall, England, United Kingdom	Decision (Unanimous)	5	3:00	
Fought for ISKA World Title.
15 November 2008	Win	(Netherlands) Hatice Özyurt		Steenwijk, United Kingdom	Decision (Unanimous)	5	2:00	
Fought for NMF World Title
20 June 2008	Loss	(Netherlands) Germaine de Randamie		Montego Bay, Jamaica	Decision	3	3:00	
Fought for WIKBA & IKCC World titles • Full Thai rules
17 November 2007	Win	(United States) Kerry Vera	Battle in Bournemouth V	Bournemouth, England, United Kingdom	Decision (Unanimous)	5	3:00	
28 September 2007	Loss	(United States) Natalie Fuz	Mayhem X: Mayhem moves to Midtown	New York City, United States	Decision (Majority)	5	2:00	
1 July 2007	Win	(New Zealand) Karen Lynch		United Kingdom	Decision	5	3:00	
UK Muay Thai title fight
27 May 2007	Win	(Spain) Itziar Onaindi Abad	Lady Killers Fight Night	United Kingdom	Decision	5	2:00	
20 May 2007	Win	(Italy) Sonia Mirabelli	World Muay Thai Championships	Liverpool, England, United Kingdom	N/A	N/A	N/A	
March 2007	Win	(England) Emma Bowers		Torquay, England, United Kingdom	Decision (Majority)	3	3:00	
9 February 2007	Win	(United States) Natalie Fuz	Mayhem at Mulberry	New York City, United States	Decision (Majority)	3	3:00	
19 November 2006	Win	(Italy) Sonia Mirabelli	Capital Punishment	London, England, United Kingdom	Decision (Majority)	5	3:00	
15 October 2006	Win	(Spain) Loli Muñoz Garcia	K-1 event in London	Torquay, England, United Kingdom	Points	5	3:00	
Fought for WIKBA title
29 July 2006	Win	(United Kingdom) Natalie Bee	Battle in Bournemouth III	Bournemouth, England, United Kingdom	Points	5	3:00	
Fought for WKA British title
8 July 2006	Win	(United Kingdom) Lucy Hunking	BKK Promotions: All Female Show	Plymouth, England, United Kingdom	Points	5	2:00	
Fought for British Junior Welterweight title
29 April 2006	Loss	(United Kingdom) Nicky Carter	Muay Thai Warriors 6	Crawley, England, United Kingdom	Points	5	2:00	
Fought for WPKL European title
12 March 2006	Win	(United Kingdom) Karla Hood		London, England, United Kingdom	TKO (Knees to the body)	N/A	N/A	
15 October 2005	Win	(United Kingdom) Lucy Hunking	Muay Thai Warriors 5	Crawley, England, United Kingdom	Decision (Unanimous)	5	2:00	
UK Muay Thai title fight
20 August 2005	Win	(England) Sheree Halliday	Woking Muay Thai Show	Woking, England, United Kingdom	Points	5	2:00	
IKF British Title
3 October 2004	Loss	(England) Bernise Alldis	Muay Thai Warriors 3	Crawley, England, United Kingdom	Points	5	2:00	
2 October 2004	Win	(United Kingdom) Rebecca Donnelly		Crawley, England, United Kingdom	Decision (Unanimous)	5	2:00	
WPKL British Title
May 2004	Loss	(England) Emma Bowers		Torquay, England, United Kingdom	Points	3	3:00	
2003	Loss	(United Kingdom) Karla Hood		(United Kingdom)	Points	3	3:00	
May 2002	Win	(United Kingdom) Jo Abrehart		(United Kingdom)	Points	3	3:00	
March 2002	Win	(England) Diane Fletcher		(United Kingdom)	Points	3	3:00	

Amateur kickboxing record
Date	Result	Opponent	Event	Location	Method	Round	Time
2009-05-21	Loss	(Finland) Katarina Perkkiö	IFMA European Championships	Liepāja, Latvia	Decision (Unanimous)	4	2:00
2005-09-10	Win	(United Kingdom) Shelley Wilson		Kent, England	Points	N/A	N/A
Legend: Win Loss Draw/No contest Notes

== See also ==
- List of female kickboxers
