= Fight Girls =

- Opening theme: "Fingerprints" by Katy Perry
- Country of origin: United States
- No. of episodes: 7

Production
- Running time: 44 minutes

Original release
- Network: Oxygen
- Release: June 12 – July 27, 2007

Fight Girls is an Oxygen original reality television series that spun off from a 2006 special which documented seven female fighters' attempts at winning a championship. The initial special aired on August 7, 2006, and the series premiered June 12, 2007. Fight Girls is produced by Scott Messick and Tom Weber.

Similar in spirit to Spike TV's The Ultimate Fighter, ten female fighters live together and train with a Muay Thai instructor in Las Vegas for six weeks in an effort to fight for a Muay Thai championship in Thailand. The group of women is narrowed down to five via a three-round fight between house mates set up by the head trainer. The losing fighter is eliminated from the house and the winner will go to Thailand at the end of the season. The theme song for Fight Girls is "Fingerprints" by Katy Perry.

== Cast ==
=== Head Trainer ===
- Master Toddy

=== Fighters ===
- Ardra Hernandez
- Dawn Boyd
- Felice Herrig
- Gina Reyes
- Kerry Vera
- Jeanine Jackson
- Jennifer Tate
- Lisa Mills
- Michelle Waterson
- Miriam Nakamoto

=== Mentors ===
- Gina Carano
- Lisa King

== Results ==
Episode 1 - Hit Me with Your Best Shot (Air date June 12, 2007)

- Master Toddy chose Felice Herrig vs. Gina Reyes for the first fight.
- Gina Carano mentored Felice and Lisa King mentored Gina.
- Felice defeated Gina by unanimous decision after three rounds.

Episode 2 - Hungry Like the Wolf (Air date June 19, 2007)

- Master Toddy chose Dawn Boyd vs. Jeanine Jackson for the second fight.
- Gina Carano mentored Jeanine and Lisa King mentored Dawn.
- Dawn defeated Jeanine by unanimous decision after three rounds.

Episode 3 - Girls Just Wanna Have Fun (Air date June 26, 2007)

- Master Toddy chose Kerry Vera vs. Lisa Mills for the third fight.
- Gina Carano mentored Lisa and Lisa King mentored Kerry.
- Kerry's husband UFC fighter Brandon Vera stops by the house to help her train.
- Kerry defeated Lisa by unanimous decision after three rounds.

Episode 4 - Breaking Us in Two (Air date July 10, 2007)

- The result of a training exercise paired Ardra Fernandez Vs. Michelle Waterson as the fourth fight.
- Gina Carano mentored Ardra and Lisa King mentored Michelle.
- Ardra defeated Michelle by unanimous decision after three rounds.

Episode 5 - Another One Bites the Dust (Air date July 17, 2007)

- The final fight between housemates by default is Jennifer Tate Vs. Miriam Nakamoto
- Gina Carano mentored Jennifer and Lisa King mentored Miriam
- Miriam defeated Jennifer by split decision after three rounds

Episode 6 - Revenge (Air date July 24, 2007)

- The 5 finalists train for their fight in Thailand
- Featured fights are Lisa King, Ariana Ramirez, and Kourtney
- Lisa and Ariana defeated their opponents.
- Felice and Ardra were chosen as the two to fight in Bangkok first

Episode 7 - Hurts So Good (Air date July 31, 2007)

- The 5 finalists, Lisa, Gina, & Master Toddy travel to Thailand.
- The girls are troubled with the target weight they were assigned.
- Felice, Ardra [T.K.O], Kerry[by K.O], & Miriam[by T.K.O] won their fights.
- Dawn lost her fight.

After the Show

- Ardra shared her victory with her daughter.
- Gina Reyes continues to teach Muay Thai to women at her gym American Boxing in San Diego.
- Felice participated on season 20 of The Ultimate Fighter and currently fights in the strawweight division of the UFC.
- Dawn continues to train with Master Toddy in Las Vegas.
- Kerry continues to train with her husband in San Diego.
- Miriam is traveling back to Thailand to defend her world title.
- Michelle is a contender in the strawweight division of the UFC.

== Critical response ==
Critical reaction to the show is mixed. Randee Dawn of The Hollywood Reporter says of the show, "A documentary [as opposed to a reality TV program] might have even explored the whiff of dilettantism hanging over the amateurs: To Thai women with limited career opportunities, Muay Thai is a way of life. For Americans, it's a means to opening a gym." Gail Pennington of the St. Louis Post-Dispatch claims Fight Girls the pick of the night for Monday (the program originally airing on Monday, August 7, 2006), but notes, "Summer can't last forever," indicating that Fight Girls is merely the best of a lackluster evening.
