= Amanda Kelly =

Scottish thaiboxer

- Other names: Machine Gun
- Nationality: Scottish
- Height: 5 ft 9 in (1.75 m)
- Weight: 126 lb (57 kg; 9.0 st)
- Division: Bantamweight
- Reach: 70.0 in (178 cm)
- Style: Boxing, Muay Thai
- Stance: Southpaw
- Team: KO Gym

Kickboxing record
- Total: 32
- Wins: 30
- By knockout: 9
- Losses: 1
- Draws: 1

Mixed martial arts record
- Total: 4
- Wins: 1
- By knockout: 1
- Losses: 3
- By knockout: 1
- By submission: 1
- By decision: 1

Other information
- Website: https://www.amandakellypt.com/
- Mixed martial arts record from Sherdog

Amanda Kelly is a Scottish female kickboxer and mixed martial artist, based in London. She has competed professionally since 2005 and is currently in the Cage Warriors Bantamweight division. She trained in Muay Thai for five years, developing an upright stance compared to others in her training group.

== Fight career ==
Amanda Kelly began competing in the IFMA European Championships 2009 in Latvia and the IFMA World Championships 2009 in Thailand gaining a Silver and Bronze medals. Amanda then made the decision to focus and become a kickboxer the sport and gave up her career in Architecture. This decision lead to her achieving the WMC (MAD) World Title (2010) and the ISKA World Title (2011). Amanda Kelly has defeated opponents such as Joanna Jędrzejczyk, Chantal Ughi, Claire Haigh, Rachida Hilali.

Amanda Kelly is originally from a small village outside of Inverness called Drumnadrochit. She studied and worked in Scotland but did not have the time to train and compete which led her to moving to London. The East London KO Muay Thai gym was the first gym she joined after moving.

Amanda Kelly worked in the field of architecture when she first moved to London. After this, she began to study to become a personal trainer.

== Titles ==
- 2011 – ISKA World Champion
- 2010 – WMC (MAD) World Champion
- 2009 – IFMA World Championships, Thailand (Bronze)
- 2009 – IFMA European Championships, Latvia (Silver)

== Kickboxing record ==
Kickboxing Record
30 Wins, 1 Loss, 1 Draws
Date	Result	Opponent	Event	Location	Method	Round	Time	Record
March 13, 2013	Win	(Morocco) Fatima Adib	Enfusion Live	London, England	Decision			30–1–1
January 12, 2012	Win	(England) Julie Kitchen	In Honor of the King, Playa Vista	Los Angeles, United States	Split Decision			29–1–1
Julie Kitchens retirement fight
July 12, 2012	Win	(Italy) Chantal Ughi		London, England	TKO (Liver Kick)			28–1–1
June 19, 2010	Win	(Poland) Joanna Jędrzejczyk	Lady Killers 4	Manchester, England	Unanimous Decision	5	3:00	27–1–1
April 25, 2010	Draw	(Luxembourg) Claire Haigh	Muay Thai Addicts III	(England)	Unanimous Decision	3	3:00	26–1–1
Legend: Win Loss Draw/No contest Notes

== Mixed martial arts record ==
Professional record breakdown
4 matches	1 win	3 losses
By knockout	1	1
By submission	0	1
By decision	0	1

Res.	Record	Opponent	Method	Event	Date	Round	Time	Location	Notes
Loss	1–3	L.J. Adams	Submission (Rear-Naked Choke)	CWFC 72 – Cage Warriors Fighting Championship 72	13 September 2014	3	3:33	Newport, Wales	
Loss	1–2	Kerry Hughes	TKO (Punches)	CWFC 69 – Super Saturday	7 July 2014	2	4:56	London, England	
Loss	1–1	Laura Howarth	Decision (Unanimous)	CWFC 64 – Cage Warriors Fighting Championship 64	15 February 2014	3	5:00	London, England	
Win	1–0	Hannah Stephens	KO (Knee)	CWFC 60 – Cage Warriors Fighting Championship 60	5 October 2013	1	3:40	London, England	

== See also ==
- List of female kickboxers
- List of female mixed martial artists
