= Claire Haigh =

Luxembourgish kickboxer and mixed martial artist (born 1980)

- Born: September 16, 1980 (age 46); Ottignies, Belgium
- Nationality: (Luxembourg) Luxembourgish
- Height: 5 ft 9 in (1.75 m)
- Weight: 126 lb (57 kg; 9.0 st)
- Division: Bantamweight (MMA); Lightweight (Kickboxing)
- Reach: 70.0 in (178 cm)
- Style: Boxing, Muay Thai
- Fighting out of: Phuket, Thailand
- Team: Tiger Muay Thai
- Years active: 2007 - present

Kickboxing record
- Total: 26
- Wins: 18
- Losses: 7
- Draws: 1

Mixed martial arts record
- Total: 4
- Wins: 3
- By knockout: 1
- By submission: 2
- Losses: 0
- Draws: 1

Other information
- Mixed martial arts record from Sherdog

Claire Haigh (born 16 September 1980) is a Luxembourgish female kickboxer and mixed martial artist.

She is the former WPMF Lightweight and Super Lightweight champion, as well as the WPMF World Pro League Super Lightweight Champion. She is also the former WMC Lightweight champion. She is a two time ISKA Lightweight World title challenger.

== Martial arts career ==
Haigh made her kickboxing debut in 2007, against Sheree Halliday, during Woking Fight Night 4. She lost a decision.

In 2009, Haigh was given the opportunity to fight for the World Professional Muaythai Federation Lightweight title, against Chantal Ughi. She won by way of TKO. Haigh fought Chantal Ughi for the World Professional Muaythai Federation Super Lightweight title in the same year, winning a decision.

Haigh defended her WPMF title in 2010, when she faced Stephanie Ielö Page, and won a unanimous decision.

Claire Haigh next fought Lanzi Estella for the KSFL World title. She would win a unanimous decision.

During Penzance Fight Night 2010: Fast And Furious, Haigh faced Julie Kitchen for the IKF World title. She lost a close split decision.

Haigh's next fight was likewise a title fight. She fought Miriam Nakamoto for the WBC Muaythai Lightweight title. Nakamoto won the bout by knockout.

Claire Haigh would then go on a six fight winning streak before challenging Angélique Pitiot for the ISKA World Lightweight title. During this winning streak, she defended her lightweight title twice, against Kwanta Soonkeeranakornsree, and against Nilawan Techasuep. Pitiot won by knockout.

She fought and defeated Nong Nan Jor Nguan in 2012 for the WMC World Lightweight title in 2012.

== Championships and accomplishments ==
- World Professional Muaythai Federation
  - WPMF World Lightweight Championship (135 lbs)
    - Two successful title defenses
  - WPMF World Super Lightweight Championship (140 lbs)
  - WPMF World Pro League Super Lightweight Championship (140 lbs)
- World Muaythai Council
  - WMC World Lightweight Championship (135 lbs)

== Kickboxing record ==
Kickboxing/Muay Thai Record (incomplete)
18 Wins, 7 Loss, 2 Draws
Date	Result	Opponent	Event	Location	Method	Round	Time	Record
June 13, 2015	Win	(France) Marlene Caneva		France	KO	5		
March 29, 2014	Loss	(Belgium) Anke Van Gestel	Kings of Muay Thaï 5	Luxembourg	Decision (unanimous)	5	3:00	
Fought for ISKA World Title.
November 16, 2013	Win	(France) Saida Atmani	Kings of Muay Thai 4	Luxembourg	TKO	4		
June 8, 2013	Loss	(Italy) Veronica Vernocchi	Fighter’s Legion	Luxembourg	Decision (split)	3	3:00	
May 25, 2013	Win	(Brazil) Laetitia Bakissy	One versus One	Trappes, France	Points	5	3:00	
April 27, 2013	Win	(Netherlands) Hatice Ozyurt	No Pain, No Muay Thai, Belgium	Andenne, Belgium	TKO			
March 2, 2013	Win	(France) Marlene Caneva	Kings of Muay Thai 3	Luxembourg	KO	5		
November 10, 2012	Loss	(France) Angélique Pitiot	Tower Muay Thai	Paris, France	KO	1		
Fought for ISKA World Title.
May 5, 2012	Win	(France) Saida Atmani	Fight Fever 5th Edition	Longeville-lès-Metz, France	TKO			
March 31, 2012	Win	(Netherlands) Roxana Gaal	Fight Fever 5th Edition	Luxembourg	TKO	3		
February 11, 2012	Win	(Portugal) Sandra Pires	Kings of Muay Thai 2	Oberkorn, Luxembourg	TKO	3		
Won WPL World Title; Retained KSFL World Title.
September 7, 2011	Win	(Thailand) Nilawan Techasuep	WPMF World Championship	Bali, Indonesia	Points	5	3:00	
Retained WPMF World Title.
April 18, 2011	Win	(Thailand) Kwanta Soonkeeranakornsree	WPMF World Championship	Phuket, Thailand	TKO	4		
Retained WPMF World Title.
September 23, 2010	Win	(Thailand)		Phuket, Thailand	Points	3	2:00	
August 21, 2010	Loss	(United States) Miriam Nakamoto	WCK Muay Thai The Top Best	Haikou City, Hainan Island, China	KO	1		
Fought for WBC World Title.
May 9, 2010	Loss	(England) Julie Kitchen		Cornwall, England	Decision (split)	3	3:00	
Fought for IKF World title
April 25, 2010	Draw	(Scotland) Amanda Kelly	Muay Thai Addicts III	London, England	Draw (unanimous)	3	3:00	
April 17, 2010	Win	(Italy) Lanzi Estella	Gala KSFL	Luxembourg	Decision	5	2:00	
Won KSFL World Title.
January 21, 2010	Win	(France) Stephanie Ielö Page	WPMF World Championship	Saphan Buri Stadium, Thailand	Decision	3	3:00	
Retained WPMF World Title.
December 5, 2009	Loss	(England) Julie Kitchen	Kings Cup Tournament	Bangkok, Thailand	Points	3	2:00	
August 11, 2009	Win	(Italy) Chantal Ughi	Queens Birthday - Muay Thai Event	Bangkok, Thailand	TKO			
Won WPMF World Title.
February 26, 2007	Win	(Belarus) Ifa Onuga	England vs Belarus	London, England	Points	3	2:00	
February 11, 2007	Loss	(England) Sheree Halliday	Woking Fight Night 4	Woking, England	Points	3	2:00	
Legend: Win Loss Draw/No contest Notes

== Mixed martial arts record ==
Professional record breakdown
3 matches	3 wins	0 losses
By knockout	1	0
By submission	2	0
By decision	0	0

Res.	Record	Opponent	Method	Event	Date	Round	Time	Location	Notes
Draw	3–0–1	Jin Tang	Draw (Unanimous)	DQ - Dragon Qilu	October 28, 2011	3	5:00	Shandong, China	
Win	3–0	Eileen Forrest	Submission (Rear-Naked Choke	MC - Martial Combat 12	October 16, 2010	2	2:06	Singapore	
Win	2–0	Sun Jiao	TKO (Elbows)	MC - Martial Combat 5	July 15, 2010	3	3:30	Singapore	
Win	1–0	Angela Rivera-Parr	Rear-Naked Choke	CWA - Cage Wars Australia 2	September 12, 2009	1	2:40	Queensland, Australia	
