= Ashley Brace =

Welsh boxer (born 1991)

Personal information
- Born: 9 March 1991 (age 35) Abergavenny, Monmouthshire, Wales
- Height: 5 ft 2 in (157 cm)
- Weight: Bantamweight, Super-flyweight

Boxing career
- Stance: Orthodox

Boxing record
- Total fights: 9
- Wins: 8
- Win by KO: 3
- Draws: 1
Medal record
Women's amateur boxing
Representing Wales
European Youth Boxing Championships
| Bronze medal – third place | 2008 Yambol | 57 kg |

Ashley Brace (born 9 March 1991) is a Welsh bare-knuckle boxer and former professional boxer. During her professional boxing career she held the European female super-flyweight title, while as an amateur she won a bronze medal in the 57 kg category at the 2008 European Youth Boxing Championships.

== Amateur career ==
Brace started kickboxing at the age of eight after being bullied at school and initially tried boxing to improve her hand speed. Having switched sports, she won a bronze medal, representing Wales, in the 57 kg category at the 2008 European Youth Boxing Championships in Yambol, Bulgaria.

Brace defeated Lynsey Holdaway by split decision to win the 51 kg division at the 2014 Welsh Elite Boxing Championship. She was subsequently selected for Wales team to compete at the 2014 Commonwealth Games in Glasgow, Scotland. However, Brace was dropped from the squad when the International Boxing Association ruled her ineligible as she had previously taken part in professional kickboxing, a claim she denied.

== Professional career ==
Brace turned professional in 2015, defeating Bojana Libiszewska on points over four rounds on her pro-debut in Newport on 30 October that year.

Unbeaten in her first five paid fights, she faced Alexandra Vlajk for the vacant WBC International female bantamweight title in Ebbw Vale on 22 April 2017, winning the contest by stoppage in the ninth round.

Brace fought Melania Sorroche for the vacant European female bantamweight title in Merthyr Tydfil on 15 December 2017. After the full 10 rounds were completed, her opponent was announced as the winner via majority decision. However, whilst Sorroche was celebrating her triumph, a recount of the scorecards took place and a calculation error was discovered leading to the result being changed to a split draw with one judge favouring each boxer and the third ruling the bout a tie.

On 14 April 2018, Brace got a second shot at a European championship, this facing time Xenia Jorneac for the vacant super-flyweight title at Ice Arena Wales in Cardiff. She won by unanimous decision.

== Bare knuckle boxing career ==
In September 2024, BYB Extreme Fighting Series announced it had signed Brace to a multi-fight contract. She made her debut for the promotion at BYB 36: Cardiff Brawl 2 on 1 February 2025, taking on Bianca Daimoni. Brace lost the five-round super-welterweight contest by split decision.

She faced Hatice Özyurt at Bristol Ice Arena in Bristol on 6 September 2025, winning the fight when the ringside doctor decided her opponent was unfit to continue at the end of the third round.

== Professional boxing record ==
| 9 fights | 8 wins | 0 losses |
|---|---|---|
| By knockout | 3 | 0 |
| By decision | 5 | 0 |
| Draws | 1 | |

| No. | Result | Record | Opponent | Type | Round, time | Date | Location | Notes |
|---|---|---|---|---|---|---|---|---|
| 9 | Win | 8–0–1 | Xenia Jorneac | UD | 10 | 14 Apr 2018 | Ice Arena Wales, Cardiff, Wales | Won vacant European female super-flyweight title |
| 8 | Draw | 7–0–1 | Melania Sorroche | SD | 10 | 15 Dec 2017 | Merthyr Leisure Centre, Merthyr Tydfil, Wales | For vacant European female bantamweight title |
| 7 | Win | 7–0 | Nevenka Mikulic | PTS | 6 | 26 May 2017 | Cardiff International Arena, Cardiff, Wales | |
| 6 | Win | 6–0 | Alexandra Vlajk | TKO | 9 (10), 0:56 | 22 Apr 2017 | Leisure Centre Ebbw Vale, Wales | Won vacant WBC International female bantamweight title |
| 5 | Win | 5–0 | Galina Koleva Ivanova | PTS | 6 | 8 Oct 2016 | Rhondda Fach Sports Centre, Tylorstown, Wales | |
| 4 | Win | 4–0 | Klaudia Ferenczi | TKO | 5 (6), 1:59 | 23 Jul 2016 | Merthyr Leisure Centre, Merthyr Tydfil, Wales | |
| 3 | Win | 3–0 | Gabriella Mezei | KO | 3 (6), 1:22 | 11 Mar 2016 | Newport Centre, Newport, Wales | |
| 2 | Win | 2–0 | Petra Castkova | PTS | 6 | 24 Feb 2016 | Royal Lancaster Hotel, Bayswater, England | |
| 1 | Win | 1–0 | Bojana Libiszewska | PTS | 4 | 30 Oct 2015 | Newport Centre, Newport, Wales | |

== Bare knuckle boxing record ==
Professional record breakdown
| 2 matches | 1 win | 1 loss |
| By knockout | 1 | 0 |
| By decision | 0 | 1 |

| Res. | Record | Opponent | Method | Event | Date | Round | Time | Location | Notes |
|---|---|---|---|---|---|---|---|---|---|
| Win | 1–1 | Hatice Özyurt | Retired (Doctor stoppage) | BKB: 45 Bristol | 6 September 2025 | 3 (5) | 2:00 | Bristol Ice Arena, Bristol, England | |
| Loss | 0–1 | Bianca Daimoni | Decision (split) | BYB 36: Cardiff Brawl 2 | 1 February 2025 | 5 | 2:00 | Vale Sports Arena, Cardiff, Wales | |
