= Christina Breuer =

German kickboxer and mixed martial artist

- Born: August 4, 1998 (age 28); Germany
- Height: 5 ft 7 in (1.70 m)
- Weight: 145 lb (66 kg; 10.4 st)
- Style: Kickboxing
- Fighting out of: Cologne, Germany
- Team: Tiger Gym Kerpen (kickboxing); Fight Club Gelsenkirchen (MMA)
- Trainer: Said El Hamdaoui

Kickboxing record
- Total: 19
- Wins: 17
- By knockout: 9
- Losses: 2
- Draws: 0

Mixed martial arts record
- Total: 3
- Wins: 3
- By knockout: 2
- By submission: 1
- Losses: 0

Christina Breuer (born August 4, 1998) is a retired German kickboxer and mixed martial artist.

As of December 2019 she was the tenth ranked pound-for-pound women kickboxer in the world according to Combat Press and the #3 in the world as of October 2022 according to Beyond Kick.

== Kickboxing career ==
Breuer started training in kickboxing at the age of 15 under Said El Hamdaoui at Tiger Gym Kerpen.

On July 6, 2019, Breuer faced Patricia Rodriguez at Enfusion ECE #1 Female in Tenerife, Spain. She won by second-round knockout with a spectacular superman punch attack.

Breuer was scheduled to compete against Terasa Sortino at Enfusion 87 on September 7, 2019, for the vacant IPCC European -67 kg title. Sortino was replaced by Zana Setzock, Breuer won the fight by technical knockout in the third round.

In 2019 Breuer signed with ONE Championship. She made her promotional debut during ONE Championship: Age Of Dragons against Jorina Baars. She won by split decision, handing Baars her first loss in ten years.

Breuer came back from a close to three-year absence from competition on June 5, 2022, when she faced Ibtissam Kassrioui for the vacant Enfusion ECE Featherweight title. She won the fight by unanimous decision.

== Mixed martial arts career ==
Breuer was scheduled to make her mixed martial arts professional debut on May 6, 2023, at GMC Special Fight Series, after multiple opponents pulled out of the fight she finally competed against Annabell Honert. She won via submission in the second round.

Breuer's second professional bout happened at PFL Europe 2 on July 8, 2023 against Ruby Mesu, defeating her via TKO stoppage in the second round.

== Championships and awards ==
- Enfusion
  - 2022 Enfusion ECE Featherweight Champion
- International Professional Combat Council
  - 2019 IPCC European -67 kg Champion

== Mixed martial arts record ==
Professional record breakdown
3 matches	3 wins	0 losses
By knockout	2	0
By submission	1	0
By decision	0	0

Res.	Record	Opponent	Method	Event	Date	Round	Time	Location	Notes
Win	3–0	Anna Souza	TKO (punches)	GMC 39	September 7, 2024	1	0:12	Gelsenkirchen, Germany	catchweight (139 lbs).
Win	2–0	Ruby Mesu	TKO (punches and knees)	PFL Europe 2 (2023)	July 8, 2023	2	3:12	Berlin, Germany	Featherweight debut.
Win	1–0	Annabell Honert	Submission (rear-naked choke)	GMC Special Fight Series	May 6, 2023	2	3:54	Gelsenkirchen, Germany	Catchweight (150 lb) bout.

== Kickboxing record ==
Kickboxing Record
17 Wins (9 (T)KOs), 2 Losses, 0 Draw
Date	Result	Opponent	Event	Location	Method	Round	Time
2022-06-05	Win	(Morocco) Ibtissam Kassrioui	Enfusion ECE #8	Darmstadt, Germany	Decision (Unanimous)	5	3:00
Wins the vacant Enfusion Extreme Cage Events Featherweight title.
2019-11-16	Win	(Netherlands) Jorina Baars	ONE Championship: Age Of Dragons	Beijing, China	Decision (split)	3	3:00
2019-09-07	Win	(Germany) Zana Setzock	Enfusion 87	Darmstadt, Germany	KO	3	
Wins the vacant IPCC European -67kg title.
2019-07-06	Win	(Spain) Patricia Rodriquez	Enfusion ECE #1 Female	Tenerife, Spain	KO (Superman punch)	2	0:12
2019-05-04	Win	(Germany) Sumeyra Gorur	Husdino Gym - The Beginning	Germany	KO (Spinning back fist)	2	
2018-06-09	Loss	(Netherlands) Fauve Quentin	STORM Fighting Championship 11	Wiehl, Germany	Decision	5	
For the Storm FC DKKO European -65kg title.
2017-11-04	Win	(Germany) Henrietta Mathieu	STORM Fighting Championship 10	Wiehl, Germany	Decision	5	
Wins the Storm FC DKKO Pro-Am German -65kg title.
Legend: Win Loss Draw/No contest Notes

== See also ==
- List of female kickboxers
