= Cindy Dandois =

Belgian mixed martial artist

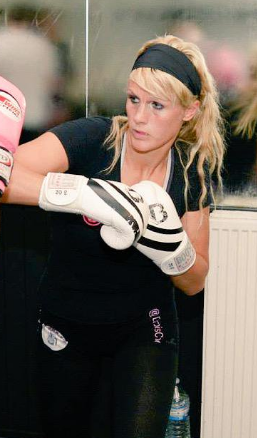
- Born: 26 October 1984 (age 41); Deurne, Belgium
- Other names: Battlecat
- Nationality: Belgian
- Height: 5 ft 7 in (1.70 m)
- Weight: 155 lb (70 kg; 11.1 st)
- Division: Bantamweight; Featherweight; Lightweight
- Reach: 70 in (178 cm)
- Style: Judo, Wrestling, BJJ
- Fighting out of: Antwerp, Belgium
- Team: Battlefit
- Rank: Black belt in Judo; Purple belt in Brazilian Jiu-Jitsu

Mixed martial arts record
- Total: 24
- Wins: 17
- By knockout: 4
- By submission: 10
- By decision: 2
- By disqualification: 1
- Losses: 7
- By knockout: 1
- By submission: 2
- By decision: 4

Other information
- Website: cindydandois.com
- Mixed martial arts record from Sherdog

Cindy Dandois (born 26 October 1984) is a Belgian female mixed martial artist. She formerly competed in the Bantamweight and Featherweight divisions in Invicta and the Ultimate Fighting Championship and also the Lightweight division in the Professional Fighters League (PFL). She began her judo training at the age of 5 under the training of Johan Laats, and freestyle wrestling at age 8 under Joseph Mewis. Dandois later transitioned into mixed martial arts and trains at Xtreme Couture Mixed Martial Arts while she is in the United States.

== Personal life ==
Dandois is a high school teacher. She has six children: Naomi, Eleftherios, Lola Katerina, Nafisatu, Denahi and Sara-Mae.

During her time in Strikeforce she was scheduled to fight Miesha Tate, but the bout never materialized. This brought the two together, and they have been friends ever since. Tate later invited Dandois to the United States, to assist in her in training for her second fight against Ronda Rousey.

== Mixed martial arts career ==
=== Early career ===
In January 2009, Cindy Dandois made her professional MMA debut, defeating Marloes Coenen. Over the next several years Dandois defeated champion kickboxer Jorina Baars, and took on other fighters under the M-1 banner. Dandois was going to fight Gina Carano after the latter had lost to Cris Cyborg, but had to withdraw due to getting pregnant.

=== Invicta FC ===
After three years of inactivity due to pregnancy Dandois became active again, and signed with Invicta Fighting Championships.

In her promotional debut with Invicta FC in December 2014, Dandois faced Tonya Evinger at Invicta FC 10: Waterson vs. Tiburcio. She lost the fight by armbar submission.

Dandois' next opponent was Megan Anderson, who she defeated by triangle choke submission at Invicta FC 14: Evinger vs. Kianzad.

Dandois then submitted Jessamyn Duke via armbar submission at Invicta FC 18: Grasso vs. Esquibel.

Dandois was later scheduled to face Cris Cyborg at a 140-pound catchweight, but the fight was cancelled. Daria Ibragimova was given the headliner fight instead, as a 145 title shot against Cyborg.

=== Ultimate Fighting Championship ===
In February 2017, it was announced that Dandois had signed with the UFC. In her debut, Dandois fought Alexis Davis at UFC Fight Night 108. She lost the fight via unanimous decision. Dandois later announced on her Instagram that she had been released from the UFC.

=== Rizin Fighting Federation ===
Dandois then signed with the Japanese promotion Rizin Fighting Federation. She made her debut against Reina Miura at Rizin World Grand Prix 2017: 2nd Round on 29 December 2017. She won the fight by split decision.

=== Bellator MMA ===
Dandois faced Olga Rubin on 15 November 2018 at Bellator 209 She lost the fight via unanimous decision.

=== Professional Fighters League ===
In March 2020, Dandois signed with Professional Fighters League. Dandois made her debut against Kaitlin Young at PFL 3 on 6 May 2021. She lost the bout via unanimous decision.

Dandois faced Kayla Harrison on 25 June 2021 at PFL 6. She lost the bout in the first round via an arm bar submission.

== Controversies ==
=== Battery incident by Mustapha Brika ===
In November 2019, Dandois accused her then boyfriend Mustapha Brika, who is also a MMA fighter, of assaulting her and breaking her nose. Brika denied the assault and stated the injury was caused by Dandois herself. In December 2020 a Belgian court sentenced Brika to 50 hours of community service.

== Mixed martial arts record ==
Professional record breakdown
24 matches	17 wins	7 losses
By knockout	4	1
By submission	10	2
By decision	2	4
By disqualification	1	0

Res.	Record	Opponent	Method	Event	Date	Round	Time	Location	Notes
Win	17–7	Eleytheria Mitroy	Submission (armbar)	Cage Survivor 16	29 May 2022	1	1:05	Athens, Greece	Return to Featherweight.
Loss	16–7	Kayla Harrison	Submission (armbar)	PFL 6 (2021)	25 June 2021	1	4:44	Atlantic City, New Jersey, United States	
Loss	16–6	Kaitlin Young	Decision (unanimous)	PFL 3 (2021)	6 May 2021	3	5:00	Atlantic City, New Jersey, United States	Return to Lightweight.
Win	16–5	Eleni Mytilinaki	Submission (armbar)	Cage Survivor 14	15 December 2019	2	1:50	Athens, Greece	
Win	15–5	Bethany Christensen	Submission (triangle choke)	ExciteFight: Conquest of the Cage	15 November 2019	1	1:56	Spokane, Washington, United States	
Win	14–5	Elsira Sheree Amstelveen	Submission (triangle choke)	Enfusion MMA 90	2 November 2019	1	N/A	Antwerp, Belgium	
Win	13–5	Gemma Pike	Submission (rear-naked choke)	Staredown FC 14	16 March 2019	1	2:00	Antwerp, Belgium	Won the SFC Women's Featherweight Championship.
Loss	12–5	Iony Razafiarison	Decision (split)	European Beatdown 5	2 February 2019	3	5:00	La Louvière, Belgium	Bantamweight bout.
Loss	12–4	Olga Rubin	Decision (unanimous)	Bellator 209	16 November 2018	3	5:00	Tel Aviv, Israel	
Win	12–3	Irén Rácz	TKO (punches)	Staredown FC 12	17 March 2018	2	N/A	Deurne, Belgium	Return to Featherweight.
Win	11–3	Hatice Ozyurt	Submission (triangle choke)	Steenwijk Martial Arts Gala: Battle Under the Tower 2018	24 February 2018	2	1:46	Steenwijk, Netherlands	Catchweight (150 lb) bout.
Win	10–3	Reina Miura	Decision (split)	Rizin World Grand Prix 2017: 2nd Round	29 December 2017	3	5:00	Saitama, Japan	Lightweight debut.
Win	9–3	Kerry Hughes	TKO (punches)	Cage Warriors 89	25 November 2017	1	1:53	Antwerp, Belgium	Catchweight (140 lb) bout.
Loss	8–3	Alexis Davis	Decision (unanimous)	UFC Fight Night: Swanson vs. Lobov	22 April 2017	3	5:00	Nashville, Tennessee, United States	
Win	8–2	Anjela Pink	TKO (submission to punches)	Conquest of the Cage 24	11 November 2016	1	0:13	Airway Heights, Washington, United States	Featherweight bout.
Win	7–2	Jessamyn Duke	Submission (scarf hold armlock)	Invicta FC 18: Grasso vs. Esquibel	29 July 2016	1	1:33	Kansas City, Missouri, United States	
Win	6–2	Megan Anderson	Submission (triangle choke)	Invicta FC 14: Evinger vs. Kianzad	12 September 2015	2	2:41	Kansas City, Missouri, United States	Featherweight bout.
Loss	5–2	Tonya Evinger	Submission (armbar)	Invicta FC 10: Waterson vs. Tiburcio	5 December 2014	2	1:23	Houston, Texas, United States	
Win	5–1	Jorina Baars	TKO (punches)	Staredown FC	19 March 2011	2	4:50	Antwerp, Belgium	Featherweight bout.
Loss	4–1	Yana Kunitskaya	TKO (punches)	M-1 Challenge 22	10 December 2010	1	0:34	Moscow, Russia	Bantamweight debut.
Win	4–0	Sheila Gaff	DQ (illegal knee to the head)	M-1 Selection 2010: Western Europe Round 3	29 May 2010	3	0:10	Helsinki, Finland	
Win	3–0	Daria Ibragimova	Submission (triangle choke)	M-1 Selection 2010: Western Europe Round 2	27 March 2010	1	3:02	Weesp, Netherlands	
Win	2–0	Maria Hougaard Djursaa	TKO (punches)	M-1 Selection 2010: Western Europe Round 1	5 February 2010	1	1:12	Hilversum, Netherlands	
Win	1–0	Marloes Coenen	Decision (unanimous)	Beast of the East	24 January 2009	3	5:00	Zutphen, Netherlands	Featherweight debut.

== See also ==
- List of female mixed martial artists
