= Miriam Nakamoto =

American kickboxer, MMA fighter, and Muay Thai fighter (born 1976)

- Born: Miriam Herbie Nakamoto; August 5, 1976 (age 50); Hawaii, United States
- Other names: The Queen of Mean
- Height: 5 ft 10 in (1.78 m)
- Weight: 135 lb (61 kg; 9.6 st)
- Division: Bantamweight
- Style: Muay Thai, Kickboxing, Boxing, Brazilian jiu-jitsu
- Fighting out of: Dublin, California, United States
- Team: Combat Sports Academy
- Rank: Blue Belt in Brazilian Jiu-Jitsu
- Years active: 2005–2013 (Kickboxing); 2012–2013 (MMA)

Professional boxing record
- Total: 5
- Wins: 2
- By knockout: 1
- Losses: 3

Kickboxing record
- Total: 14
- Wins: 14
- Losses: 0

Mixed martial arts record
- Total: 4
- Wins: 2
- By knockout: 2
- Losses: 1
- By knockout: 1
- No contests: 1

Other information
- Website: https://twitter.com/MiriamNakamoto
- Boxing record from BoxRec
- Mixed martial arts record from Sherdog

Miriam Herbie Nakamoto (born August 5, 1976) is an American professional female Muay Thai fighter and mixed martial artist fighting at Bantamweight (135 pounds).

== Early life ==
Nakamoto was born in the U.S. state of Hawaii and began training in Muay Thai at 23 years old. She later moved to California to live with her father and a stepmother. Nakamoto's great grandmother arrived in Hawaii as a picture bride.

== Muay Thai career ==
Nakamoto began fighting Muay Thai professionally in 2005. She retired with an undefeated 14-0 record.

== Mixed martial arts career ==
=== Red Canvas ===
In 2012, Nakamoto made the transition to MMA. On September 15, 2012, Nakamoto made her MMA debut at Red Canvas Fight Promotions- Art of Submission 2. Nakamoto finished her opponent, Elizabeth Phillips, with knees in the 2nd round.

=== Invicta Fighting Championships ===
Nakamoto made her Invicta FC debut on April 5, 2013, at Invicta FC 5: Penne vs. Waterson. She knocked out future The Ultimate Fighter 18 contestant Jessamyn “The Gun” Duke in the first round to win the IFC: Knock out of the Night. The result was originally a KO for Nakamoto, but over a month later, the Missouri Office of Athletics changed it to a no contest due to an illegal knee.

Nakamoto returned to Invicta FC for their next event, Invicta FC 6: Coenen vs. Cyborg. She faced professional boxer Duda Yankovich. Nakamoto won by first-round TKO to knee and punches. She again received the IFC: Knock out of the Night.

Nakamoto faced undefeated Lauren Murphy for the inaugural Invicta FC bantamweight championship belt at Invicta FC 7: Honchak vs. Smith on December 7, 2013. Nakamoto lost the fight in the fourth round when she injured her knee.

On July 28, 2019, Nakamoto announced that Joe Rogan paid for her stem-cell therapy to treat her meniscus, which had a Grade 3 lesion and prevented her from fighting since 2013.

== Television and film ==
In 2005, Nakamoto was the Female Lead in the music video Tired of Being Sorry directed by Joaquin Phoenix and performed by indie rock band Ringside. In 2007, Miriam was on the hit reality TV show, Fight Girls, which aired on the Oxygen Channel. In episode 5, Nakamoto defeated housemate Jennifer Tate by split decision after three exhibition rounds.

== Championships and accomplishments ==
=== Mixed martial arts ===
- Invicta Fighting Championships
  - Knockout of the Night (Two times)

=== Muay Thai ===
- World Championship Kickboxing
  - 2012 WCK Champion of Champions Super Lightweight Champion
- World Boxing Council Muaythai
  - 2010 WBC Muaythai World Lightweight Champion (Two title defenses)
- World Muaythai Council
  - 2010 WMC World Lightweight Champion
- Thai Boxing Association
  - 2010 TBA World Lightweight Champion
- World Professional Muaythai Federation
  - 2007 WPMF Light Welterweight Champion
- International Federation of Muaythai Amateur
  - 2009 IFMA Muaythai World Championships Gold Medalist Light Welterweight
  - 2009 IFMA Muaythai World Championships Best Female Boxer

=== Amateur boxing ===
- San Francisco Golden Gloves
  - 2004 Champion

== Kickboxing record (incomplete) ==
Kickboxing record
14 wins (? KOs), 0 losses, 0 draws
Date	Result	Opponent	Event	Location	Method	Round	Time	Record
2013-08-24	Win	(Netherlands) Aleide Lawant	WCK Muay Thai Hot Summer Fights	Temecula, California, USA	Decision (unanimous)	5	2:00	14–0
Retains WBC Muaythai Women's World Lightweight title.
2012-08-18	Win	(England) Julie Kitchen	WCK Muay Thai Champion of Champions	Pala, California, USA	Decision (unanimous)	5	2:00	13–0
Wins vacant WCK Champion of Champions Women World Super lightweight title.
2012-04-28	Win	(Canada) Sandra Bastian	Legends Muay Thai Championships	San Francisco, California, USA	TKO (strikes)	3	N/A	12–0
Wins WMC Women's World Lightweight title.
2010-12-19	Win	(Italy) Chantal Ughi	WCK Muay Thai	Haikou, China	Decision (unanimous)	5	2:00	11–0
2010-12-11	Win	(Luxembourg) Claire Haigh	WCK Muay Thai The Top Best	Haikou, China	TKO (strikes)	1	N/A	10–0
Wins WBC Muaythai Women's World Lightweight title.
2010-05-01	Win	(China) Gao Xing	Wu Lin Fen	China	Decision (unanimous)	5	2:00	9–0
2010-04-03	Win	(Australia) Angela Rivera-Parr	Muay Thai in America	Santa Monica, California, USA	Decision (unanimous)	5	3:00	8–0
Wins TBA Women's World Lightweight title.
2008-05-31	Win	(United States) Sally Krumdiak	XFA 2	Las Vegas, Nevada, USA	Decision (unanimous)	3	3:00	7–0
2007-08-12	Win	(Turkey) Helena	Queen's Cup	Bangkok, Thailand	Decision (unanimous)	5	2:00	6–0
Wins WPMF Women's World Light Welterweight title.
2006-03-00	Win	(Thailand)	Fight Girls Finals	Phuket, Thailand	Decision (split)	5	2:00	5–0
2006-00-00	Win	(United States) Jennifer Tate	Fight Girls	Las Vegas, Nevada, USA	Decision (split)	3	2:00	4–0

Amateur kickboxing record
Date	Result	Opponent	Event	Location	Method	Round	Time
2009-12-03	Win	(Morocco) Rachida Hilali	IFMA World Muaythai Championships 2009, Finals	Bangkok, Thailand	Decision (unanimous)	N/A	N/A
Wins IFMA World Muaythai Championships Women's Light Welterweight gold medal.
2009-12-02	Win	(Sweden) Jenni Andersson	IFMA World Muaythai Championships 2009, Semi Finals	Bangkok, Thailand	N/A	N/A	N/A
2009-11-30	Win	(Finland) Katariina Perkkiö	IFMA World Muaythai Championships 2009, Quarter Finals	Bangkok, Thailand	N/A	N/A	N/A
Legend: Win Loss Draw/No contest Notes

== Mixed martial arts record ==
Professional record breakdown
4 matches	2 wins	1 loss
By knockout	2	1
No contests	1	

Res.	Record	Opponent	Method	Event	Date	Round	Time	Location	Notes
Loss	2–1 (1)	Lauren Murphy	TKO (knee injury)	Invicta FC 7: Honchak vs. Smith	December 7, 2013	4	0:23	Kansas City, Missouri, United States	For the inaugural Invicta FC Bantamweight Championship.
Win	2–0 (1)	Duda Yankovich	TKO (knee and punches)	Invicta FC 6: Coenen vs. Cyborg	July 13, 2013	1	2:08	Kansas City, Missouri, United States	Knockout of the Night.
NC	1–0 (1)	Jessamyn Duke	NC (overturned)	Invicta FC 5: Penne vs. Waterson	April 5, 2013	1	2:20	Kansas City, Missouri, United States	Originally a knockout victory for Nakamoto, but was later overturned by the Missouri Office of Athletics due to an illegal knee. Knockout of the Night.
Win	1–0	Elizabeth Phillips	TKO (knees)	Red Canvas - Art of Submission 2	September 15, 2012	2	3:39	San Jose, California, United States	

== Professional boxing record ==
5 fights	2 wins	3 losses
By knockout	1	0
By decision	1	3

No.	Result	Record	Opponent	Type	Round, time	Date	Location	Notes
5	Loss	2–3	(United States) Tatina Anderson	SD	4	May 19, 2011	Lakeside Golf Course, Burbank, California, United States	
4	Loss	2–2	(United States) Tammy Franks	SD	4	October 26, 2006	Marriott Hotel, Irvine, California, United States	
3	Loss	2–1	(United States) Crystal Morales	SD	4	May 12, 2006	Antelope Valley Fairgrounds, Lancaster, California, United States	
2	Win	2–0	(Peru) Kina Malpartida	UD	4	April 20, 2006	Marriott Hotel, Irvine, California, United States	
1	Win	1–0	(United States) Maria Elena Anderson	KO	2 (4)	May 5, 2005	Hyatt Regency Hotel, Irvine, California, United States	

== See also ==
- List of female mixed martial artists
- List of female kickboxers
