= Eileen Forrest =

Australian boxer

- Born: 15 July 1986 (age 40); Gladstone, Queensland, Australia
- Other names: E1000
- Nationality: Australian
- Height: 5 ft 7 in (1.70 m)
- Weight: 126 lb (57 kg; 9.0 st)
- Division: Bantamweight (MMA); Welterweight (Kickboxing)
- Reach: 70.0 in (178 cm)
- Style: Muay Thai

Professional boxing record
- Total: 4
- Wins: 1
- Losses: 2
- Draws: 1

Kickboxing record
- Total: 19
- Wins: 17
- Losses: 2

Mixed martial arts record
- Total: 1
- Wins: 0
- Losses: 1
- By decision: 1

Other information
- Boxing record from BoxRec
- Mixed martial arts record from Sherdog

Eileen Forrest is an Australian female kickboxer and mixed martial artist. In 2010 Eileen Forrest defeated Chantal Ughi to win the ISKA Muay Thai World Light Welterweight Championship

== Kickboxing Titles ==
- ISKA World title holder
- WKA Australian featherweight champion
- WMC Queensland Junior Lightweight champion
- WKBF Queensland Lightweight champion

== Kickboxing record ==
Kickboxing Record
19 Wins (6 (T)KO, decisions), 2 Loss, 0 Draws
Date	Result	Opponent	Event	Location	Method	Round	Time	Record
30 October 2010	Win	(Italy) Chantal Ughi	Warriors at War	Brisbane, Australia	Decision	5	3:00	
Fought for ISKA World Title.
Legend: Win Loss Draw/No contest Notes

== Professional boxing record ==
4 fights	1 win	2 losses
By knockout	1	1
By decision	0	1
Draws	1	

No.	Result	Record	Opponent	Type	Round, time	Date	Location	Notes
4	Win	1–1–2	(Australia) Yarkor Chavez Annan	TKO		16 November 2013	Entertainment Centre, Gladstone, Queensland, Australia	vacant World Boxing Foundation female lightweight title
3	Loss	0–1–2	(Australia) Diana Prazak	TKO	1 (6), 1:09	11 May 2011	The Melbourne Pavilion, Flemington, Victoria, Australia	
2	Draw	0–1–1	(Australia) Lauryn Eagle	KO		11 November 2010	The Cube, Campbelltown, Sydney, New South Wales, Australia	
1	Loss	0–0–1	(Australia) Erin McGowan	MD		10 July 2009	Joondalup Arena, Joondalup, Western Australia, Australia	

== Mixed martial arts record ==
Professional record breakdown
1 match	0 wins	1 loss
By knockout	0	0
By submission	0	1
By decision	0	0
No contests	0	

Res.	Record	Opponent	Method	Event	Date	Round	Time	Location	Notes
Loss	0–1	Claire Haigh	Submission (Rear-Naked Choke)	MC - Martial Combat 12	11 October 2010	2	2:06	Singapore	
