= Daria Ibragimova =

Russian mixed martial arts (MMA) fighter

- Born: 16 June 1984 (age 42); Russia
- Nationality: Russian
- Height: 5 ft 8 in (1.73 m)
- Weight: 145 lb (66 kg; 10.4 st)
- Division: Featherweight
- Style: Sambo
- Fighting out of: Russia
- Team: KY Promotion
- Rank: Master of Sports in Sambo

Mixed martial arts record
- Total: 11
- Wins: 9
- By knockout: 1
- By submission: 7
- By decision: 1
- Losses: 2
- By knockout: 1
- By submission: 1

Other information
- Mixed martial arts record from Sherdog

Daria Ibragimova (born 16 June 1984) is a Russian mixed martial artist, currently competing for Invicta Fighting Championships.

== Mixed martial arts record ==
Professional record breakdown
11 matches	9 wins	2 losses
By knockout	1	1
By submission	7	1
By decision	1	0
No contests	0	

Res.	Record	Opponent	Method	Event	Date	Round	Time	Location	Notes
Loss	9–2	Cris Cyborg	KO (punches)	Invicta FC 15: Cyborg vs. Ibragimova	16 January 2016	1	4:58	Costa Mesa, California, United States	For the Invicta FC Featherweight Championship.
Win	9–1	Anastasia Plisenkova	Submission (rear naked choke)	Fight Nights - Fight Club 4	26 March 2015	1	0:28	Moscow, Russia	
Win	8–1	Anastasia Kravets	Submission (rear naked choke)	RFP - Ibragimova vs. Kravets	14 March 2015	1	1:48	Dubno, Ukraine	
Win	7–1	Mariam Khalilova	Submission (armbar)	Fight Nights - Fight Club 1	5 March 2015	1	1:01	Moscow, Russia	
Win	6–1	Yulia Drukteynite	TKO (punches)	WFC - Wolf Fighting Club 5	7 December 2014	1	1:06	Lviv, Ukraine	
Win	5–1	Ekaterina Tarnavskaja	Submission (armbar)	OC - Oplot Challenge 89	23 November 2013	1	0:36	Kharkov, Ukraine	
Win	4–1	Ludmila Radko	Submission (armbar)	OC - Oplot Challenge 87	9 November 2013	2	2:20	Kharkov, Ukraine	
Win	3–1	Ludmila Radko	Submission (rear naked choke)	M-1 Selection 2010 - Eastern Europe Round 3	28 May 2010	1	0:34	Kyiv, Ukraine	
Loss	2–1	Cindy Dandois	Submission (triangle choke)	M-1 Selection 2010 - Western Europe Round 2	27 March 2010	1	3:02	Weesp, Netherlands	
Win	2–0	Tatiana Montyan	Decision (Unanimous)	M-1 Ukraine - 2009 Selections 4	24 December 2009	2	5:00	Kyiv, Ukraine	
Win	1–0	Vladena Yavorskaya	Submission (armbar)	M-1 Challenge 20 - 2009 Finals	3 December 2009	2	1:54	St. Petersburg, Russia	
