= Hatice Özyurt =

Dutch female kickboxer and mixed martial artist

Hatice Ozyurt
- Born: 23 May 1987 (age 39); Steenwijk, Netherlands
- Nationality: Dutch
- Height: 5 ft 4 in (1.63 m)
- Reach: 70.0 in (178 cm)
- Style: Muay Thai
- Stance: Southpaw

Kickboxing record
- Total: 89
- Wins: 73
- Losses: 13
- Draws: 3

Mixed martial arts record
- Total: 9
- Wins: 2
- By decision: 2
- Losses: 7
- By knockout: 2
- By submission: 5

Other information
- Website: www.haticeozyurt.nl
- Mixed martial arts record from Sherdog

Hatice Ozyurt (born 23 May 1987) is a Dutch female kickboxer and mixed martial artist, based in Steenwijk, Netherlands. She has competed professionally since 2010 and a WAKO-Pro runner up and mixed martial artist.

== Kickboxing record (incomplete) ==
Kickboxing Record
71 Wins (7 (T)KO's), 13 Loss, 3 Draws
Date	Result	Opponent	Event	Location	Method	Round	Time	Record
29 June 2013	Loss	(France) Stephanie Ielö Page		Milzac, France	Decision (majority)	3	3:00	71-13-3
For WAKO-Pro title.
11 May 2013	Loss	(Netherlands) Aledie Lewant	Enfusion: A1 Combat Cup	Eindhoven, Netherlands	Decision (majority)	3	3:00	71-12-3
27 April 2013	Loss	(Luxembourg) Claire Haigh	No Pain, No Muay Thai, Belgium	(Belgium)	TKO	3		71-11-3
8 September 2012	Loss	(Germany) Katrin Dirheimer	Amazon of K1 Grand Prix Semi-Finals	(Germany)	Decision	3	3:00	
8 September 2012	Win	(Germany) Lisa Schewe	Amazon of K1 Grand Prix Quarter-Finals	(Germany)	Decision	3	3:00	
13 May 2012	Loss	(Belgium) Anke Van Gestel	It's Showtime	Kortrijk, Belgium	Decision (unanimous)	3	3:00	
12 May 2012	Win	(Belgium) Najat Hasnouni-Alaoui	It's Showtime	Kortrijk, Belgium	Decision (unanimous)	3	3:00	
1 April 2012	Win	(Germany) Ghizlane Aazri	World Arab Boxing Championships	(United Arab Emirates) Dubai, UAE	Decision (unanimous)	3	3:00	
7 May 2011	Loss	(Netherlands) Aleide Lawant		Noordwijkerhout, Netherlands	Decision	3	3:00	
9 April 2011	Win	(Germany) Lotte Wienbeck	A1 World Combat Cupp 2011	Eindhoven, Netherlands	Decision	5	3:00	
15 November 2008	Loss	(England) Julie Kitchen		Steenwijk, Netherlands	Decision	5	2:00	
Fought for NMF World Title
25 March 2007	Loss	(Netherlands) Germaine de Randamie		(Netherlands)	Decision	3	3:00	
6 March 2006	Loss	(Netherlands) Jorina Baars		(Netherlands)	TKO	4		
26 November 2005	Loss	(Netherlands) Jorina Baars		(Netherlands)	Decision	3	3:00	
	Win	(United Kingdom) Sam Mitchell		(Netherlands)	Decision	3	2:00	
Legend: Win Loss Draw/No contest Notes

== Mixed martial arts record ==
Professional record breakdown
9 matches	2 wins	7 losses
By knockout	0	2
By submission	0	5
By decision	2	0
No contests	0	

Res.	Record	Opponent	Method	Event	Date	Round	Time	Location	Notes
Loss	2–7	Leah McCourt	TKO (doctor stoppage)	Bellator 217	23 February 2019	1	5:00	Dublin, Ireland	Catchweight (148 lb) bout; Ozyurt missed weight.
Loss	2–6	Cindy Dandois	Submission (triangle choke)	Battle Under the Tower	24 February 2018	2	1:46	Steenwijk, Netherlands	
Loss	2–5	Maiju Suotama	Submission (choke)	Carelia Fight 13	2 September 2017	1	4:13	Imatria, South Karelia, Finland	
Loss	2–4	Sinead Kavanagh	TKO (punches)	BAMMA 22: Duquesnoy vs. Loughnane	19 September 2015	1	0:17	Dublin, Ireland	
Loss	2–3	Ji Yeon Kim	Submission (armbar)	Road FC 23	2 May 2015	2	1:15	Seoul, South Korea	
Loss	2–2	Megan van Houtum	Submission (armbar)	Battle of the Kempen 2	28 October 2012	1	0:34	Beek en Donk, Netherlands	
Loss	2–1	Kamlia Balanda	Submission (rear-naked choke)	Respect Fighting Championships 7	21 April 2012	3	1:53	Essen, Germany	
Win	2–0	Lena Buytendijk	Decision (unanimous)	Battle Under the Tower	19 November 2011	2	5:00	Steenwijk, Netherlands	
Win	1–0	Lena Buytendijk	Decision (unanimous)	Uitslagen Fight Night: The Battle of Gorredijk	29 March 2009	2	5:00	Steenwijk, Netherlands	

== Bare knuckle boxing record ==
Professional record breakdown
1 match	0 wins	1 loss
By knockout	0	1

Res.	Record	Opponent	Method	Event	Date	Round	Time	Location	Notes
Loss	0–1	Ashley Brace	Retired (Doctor stoppage)	BKB: 45 Bristol	6 September 2025	3 (5)	2:00	Bristol Ice Arena, Bristol, England	
