= Jorina Baars =

Dutch kickboxer and mixed martial artist

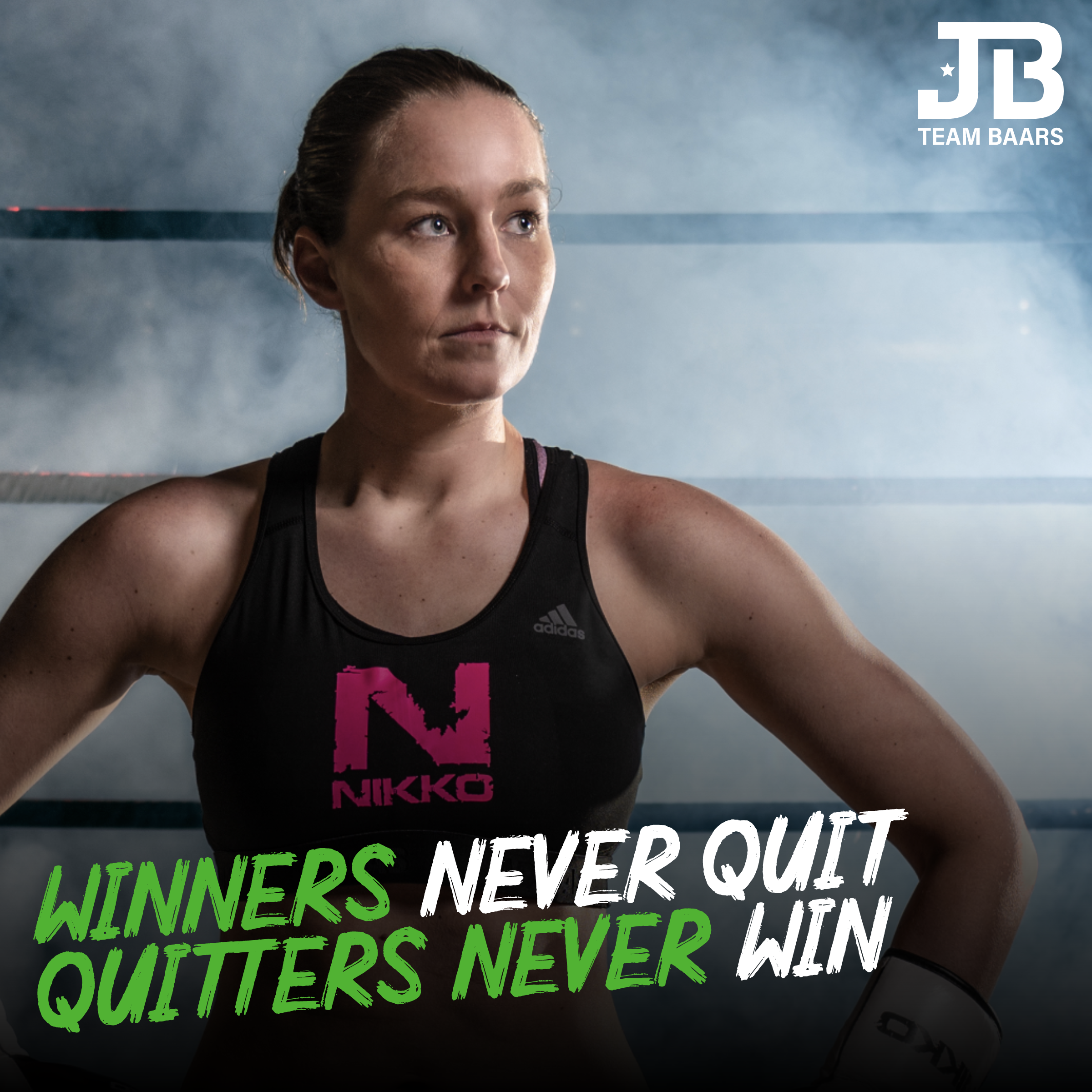
- Born: 18 October 1988 (age 38); Den Helder, Netherlands
- Height: 5 ft 11 in (1.80 m)
- Weight: 143 lb (65 kg; 10.2 st)
- Division: Welterweight; Featherweight (Muay Thai)
- Reach: 72.0 in (183 cm)
- Style: Boxing, Muay Thai, Kickboxing, Dutch Muay Thai,

Kickboxing record
- Total: 49
- Wins: 44
- By knockout: 18
- Losses: 2
- Draws: 3

Mixed martial arts record
- Total: 4
- Wins: 1
- By submission: 1
- Losses: 3
- By knockout: 3

Other information
- Mixed martial arts record from Sherdog

Jorina Baars (born 18 October 1988) is a Dutch female Muay Thai kickboxer, based in Den Helder, Netherlands. She has competed professionally since 2004 and is the current ISKA Welterweight World Muay Thai champion, Lion Fight Women's World Welterweight Champion and the Enfusion Women's Featherweight Champion.

As of September 2022, she is ranked as the #5 female pound for pound fighter in the world by Combat Press, and #4 by Beyond Kick.

== Early life ==
Baars started training in kickboxing at the age of 7, and she had her first bout at the age of 12. She was very close to her father, who used to watch all of her fights until his untimely passing.

== Martial arts career ==
=== Kickboxing ===
Jorina Baars made her debut in 2000, with a win over Tatjana Bosman. Over the next eight years, she amassed an undefeated record of 22 wins and three draws. During this time she achieved two notable wins over Hatice Ozyurt, and a win against Nong Toom.

In 2009, she participated in the ISKA World Championship Thaiboxing, where she faced Helene Garnett for the ISKA Women's World Muay Thai Welterweight Title. Baars won the fight by a split decision.

During Gladiators of the Cathedral II Baars fought Chantal Ughi for the ITMF European Championship. Baars won a split decision.

==== Lion Fight ====
After another four wins, she fought Cristiane Justino for the inaugural Lion Fight Muay Thai Women's World Welterweight Championship. Baars won a unanimous decision. Her first title defense was a rematch against Chantal Ughi. Baars won the fight by TKO, after Ughi retired after the third round. Her second title defense came against Martina Jindrová during Lion Fight 25. Baars won a unanimous decision. The third title defense came during Lion Fight 31 against Angela Whitley. Baars won a unanimous decision.

==== ONE Championship ====
After winning another four fights against Irene Martens, Athina Efmorfiadi, Anke Van Gestel and Amel Dehby, Baars signed with ONE Championship. She made her promotional debut during ONE Championship: Age Of Dragons against Christina Breuer. Baars suffered her first career loss, by a split decision. Her loss to Breuer was nominated for 2019 Combat Press Kickboxing Robbery of the Year.

==== Return to Lion Fight ====
In 2021, Baars signed a new contract with Lion Fight. She was scheduled to face Claire Clements in her promotional debut, at Lion Fight 68 on 22 August 2021. Baars won the fight by unanimous decision.

==== Enfusion ====
Baars faced Sarah Worsfold for the vacant Enfusion Women's Featherweight Championship at Enfusion 109 on 18 June 2022. She won the fight by unanimous decision. Baars made her first title defense against Erica Björnestrand at Enfusion 116 on 19 November 2022. She won the fight by unanimous decision. Baars made her second title defense against Emma Abrahamsson at Enfusion 120 on 18 March 2023. She won the fight by a fourth-round technical knockout. Baars made her third defense against Lea Zufle at Enfusion 130 on 25 November 2023. She won the fight by unanimous decision.

=== Mixed martial arts ===
Baars made her MMA debut against Cindy Dandois in 2011. Dandois won by TKO at the end of the second round. She suffered TKO losses to Danielle West and Maria Hougaard. Her first and, so far, only win came through a submission, against Alexandra Buch.

== Championships and awards ==
=== Kickboxing ===
- Enfusion
  - 2022 Enfusion Women's Featherweight Champion (inaugural; current; 3 defenses)

=== Muay Thai ===
- AwakeningFighters.com
  - 2015 Inspirational Female Fighter of the Year
  - 2015 Fight of the Year vs. Martina Jindrová at Lion Fight 25
  - 2014 Fight of the Year vs. Cristiane Justino at Lion Fight 14
  - 2014 Most Viewed Female Fighter
- Lion Fight
  - 2014 Lion Fight Women's World Welterweight Champion (inaugural; 3 defenses)
- International Sport Karate Association
  - 2009 – ISKA World Welterweight Title (66 kg)
- Other
  - 2012 – Amazon of K-1 Muay Thai Grand Prix (Winner)
  - 2011 – National Dutch Title (147 lbs)

== Muay Thai and Kickboxing record ==
Kickboxing & Muay Thai Record
44 Wins (18 (T)KO's), 2 Losses, 3 Draws
Date	Result	Opponent	Event	Location	Method	Round	Time	Record
25 November 2023	Win	(Germany) Lea Zufle	Enfusion 130	Alkmaar, Netherlands	Decision (Unanimous)	5	3:00	44–2–3
Defends the Enfusion Women's Featherweight Championship.
18 March 2023	Win	(Sweden) Emma Abrahamsson	Enfusion 120	Alkmaar, Netherlands	TKO (Body strike)	4		43–2–3
Defends the Enfusion Women's Featherweight Championship.
19 November 2022	Win	(Sweden) Erica Björnestrand	Enfusion 116	Groningen, Netherlands	Decision (Unanimous)	5	3:00	42–2–3
Defends the Enfusion Women's Featherweight Championship.
18 June 2022	Win	(United Kingdom) Sarah Worsfold	Enfusion 109	Groningen, Netherlands	Decision (Unanimous)	5	3:00	41–2–3
Wins the inaugural Enfusion Women's Featherweight Championship.
22 August 2021	Win	(England) Claire Clements	Lion Fight 68	Glasgow, Scotland	Decision (unanimous)	5	3:00	40–2–3
16 November 2019	Loss	(Germany) Christina Breuer	ONE Championship: Age Of Dragons	Beijing, China	Decision (split)	3	5:00	39–2–3
22 September 2018	Win	(France) Amel Dehby	WFL: Final 8 World Grand Prix	Almere, Netherlands	KO (Knee)	1	2:03	39–1–3
6 April 2018	Win	(Greece) Athina Efmorfiadi	Bellator Kickboxing 9	Budapest, Hungary	TKO (Knees)	2	2:28	38–1–3
23 September 2017	Win	(Belgium) Anke Van Gestel	Bellator Kickboxing 7	(United States) San Jose, CA	Decision (Unanimous)	3	3:00	37–1–3
14 April 2017	Win	(Italy) Irene Martens	Bellator Kickboxing 6: Budapest	Budapest, Hungary	TKO	3	2:55	36–1–3
2 September 2016	Win	(Puerto Rico) Angela Whitley	Lion Fight 31	Mashantucket, Connecticut, United States	Decision (Unanimous)	5	3:00	35–1–3
Retains the Lion Fight Muay Thai Women's World Welterweight Championship.
4 March 2016	Win	(Australia) Stephanie Glew	Caged Muay Thai 8	Logan City, Queensland, Australia	Decision (Unanimous)	5	3:00	34–1–3
23 October 2015	Win	(Czech Republic) Martina Jindrová	Lion Fight 25	Temecula, California, United States	Decision (Unanimous)	5	3:00	33–1–3
Retains the Lion Fight Muay Thai Women's World Welterweight Championship.
July 2015	Win	(Thailand) Gaenpet Mor RattanaBundit		Thailand	TKO	1		32–1–3
20 February 2015	Win	(Italy) Chantal Ughi	Lion Fight 20	Mashantucket, Connecticut, United States	TKO (Retirement)	3	3:00	31–1–3
Retains the Lion Fight Muay Thai Women's World Welterweight Championship.
28 March 2014	Win	(Brazil) Cristiane Justino	Lion Fight 14	Las Vegas, Nevada, United States	Decision (Unanimous)	5	3:00	30–1–3
Wins the inaugural Lion Fight Muay Thai Women's World Welterweight Championship.
8 September 2012	Win	(Germany) Katrin Dirheimer	Amazon of K1 Grand Prix Final	Herne, Germany	Decision (Unanimous)	5	3:00	29–1–3
8 September 2012	Win	(Czech Republic) Martina Jindrová	Amazon of K1 Grand Prix Semi-Finals	Herne, Germany	Decision (Unanimous)	5	3:00	28–1–3
8 September 2012	Win	(Germany) Julia Symannek	Amazon of K1 Grand Prix Quarter-Finals	Herne, Germany	TKO	2		27–1–3
12 November 2011	Win	(Netherlands) Anissa Haddaoui		Den Helder, Netherlands	TKO	4		26–1–3
17 October 2009	Win	(Italy) Chantal Ughi	Gladiators of the Cathedral II	Den Helder, Netherlands	Split Decision	5	3:00	25–1–3
Wins the ITMF European Championship
26 September 2009	Loss	(Netherlands) Orinta van der Zee	Time2Fight Ladies Tournament Final	Hoorn, Netherlands		5	3:00	24–1–3
26 September 2009	Win	(Belgium) Najat Hasnouni-Alaoui	Time2Fight Ladies Tournament Semifinals	Hoorn, Netherlands				24–0–3
29 March 2009	Win	(England) Helene Garnett	ISKA World Championship Thaiboxing	Sheffield, England	Split Decision	5	2:00	23–0–3
Wins the ISKA Ladies World Welterweight Championship
22 November 2008	Win	(Morocco) Rachida Hilali	Only the Strongest	Ter Apel, Netherlands	Decision	5	2:00	22–0–3
5 October 2008	Win	(Belgium) Najat Hasnouni-Alaoui	KOE: Tough Is Not Enough	Rotterdam, Netherlands	Decision	3	3:00	21–0–3
23 March 2008	Win	(Netherlands) Cindy Venema		Utrecht, Netherlands	Decision			20–0–3
24 November 2007	Win	(Brazil) Deborah Simabuku	Only the Strongest	Ter Apel, Netherlands	TKO	3		19–0–3
14 October 2007	Win	(Thailand) Nong Toom	Battle of Arnhem 6	Arnhem, Netherlands	Decision	3	3:00	18–0–3
25 November 2006	Win	(Spain) Loli Muñoz Garcia	Only the Strongest	Ter Apel, Netherlands	Decision	3	3:00	17–0–3
3 June 2006	Win	(Netherlands) Hatice Ozyurt	Thai Boxing Gala	Den Helder, Netherlands	TKO	3		16–0–3
15 April 2006	Win	(Morocco) Chajmaa Bellakhal	Thai Boxing Gala	Eindhoven, Netherlands	Decision	3	3:00	15–0–3
5 February 2006	Win	(Netherlands) Marloes Merza	Stare Down City	Oostzaan, Netherlands	Decision	5	3:00	14–0–3
26 November 2005	Win	(Netherlands) Hatice Ozyurt		Netherlands,	Decision	5		13–0–3
25 June 2005	Win	Jennifer Trustfull		Deventer, Netherlands	TKO	5		12–0–3
14 May 2005	Win	(Netherlands) Debbie Blok		Den Helder, Netherlands	KO	4		11–0–3
26 March 2005	Win	(Netherlands) Janneke van Heteren		Netherlands,	KO	1		10–0–3
13 February 2005	Win	(Czech Republic) Anna Zieglerova	Gym Alkmaar Fight Gala	Alkmaar, Netherlands	KO	2		9–0–3
19 December 2004	Draw	(Netherlands) Marloes Merza	Stare Down City	Landsmeer, Netherlands	Decision			8–0–3
2004	Win	(Netherlands) Jorien de Ruyter		Netherlands,	Decision			8–0–2
10 April 2004	Win	(Czech Republic) Kateřina Svobodová	Stare Down City	Landsmeer, Netherlands	KO			7–0–2
?	Win	(Netherlands) Marloes Merza		Landsmeer, Netherlands	Decision			6–0–2
?	Win	Rayen Aydin		Netherlands,	TKO	1	0:40	5–0–2
19 October 2003	Draw	(Netherlands) Patricia Mannaart		Zaandam, Netherlands	Decision			4–0–2
?	Win	Raquel Koster		Netherlands,	Decision			4–0–1
?	Win	Raquel Koster		Netherlands,	Decision			3–0–1
?	Draw	(Netherlands) Tatjana Bosman		Netherlands,	Decision			2–0–1
May or 8 October 2001	Win	Kyle Jon	Open Dutch Youth Championship	Netherlands,	TKO			2–0
?	Win	(Netherlands) Tatjana Bosman	Open Dutch Youth Championship	Netherlands,	TKO			1–0
Legend: Win Loss Draw/No contest Notes

== Mixed martial arts record ==
Professional record breakdown
4 matches	1 win	3 losses
By knockout	0	3
By submission	1	0
By decision	0	0

Res.	Record	Opponent	Method	Event	Date	Round	Time	Location	Notes
Loss	1–3	Maria Hougaard Djursaa	TKO (retirement)	European MMA 5: Frederiksberg	26 April 2013	2	5:00	Frederiksberg, Denmark	
Win	1–2	Alexandra Buch	Submission (guillotine choke)	MMAB - MMA Bundesliga 1	2 February 2013	1	0:52	Herne, Germany	
Loss	0–2	Danielle West	TKO (punches)	Girl Fights Only 7	12 February 2012	3	N/A	Netherlands	
Loss	0–1	Cindy Dandois	TKO (punches)	Staredown	9 March 2011	2	4:50	Antwerp, Belgium	

== See also ==
- List of female kickboxers
