= Erin McGowan =

Australian boxer (born 1981)

Personal information
- Nationality: Australian
- Born: Erin McGowan; 9 February 1981 (age 45) Perth, Western Australia
- Weight: Lightweight

Boxing career
- Stance: Orthodox

Boxing record
- Total fights: 19
- Wins: 17
- Win by KO: 9
- Losses: 2

Erin McGowan (born 9 February 1981) is an Australian lightweight world champion boxer and model.

== Championships and awards ==
=== Boxing ===
- World Boxing Organization World lightweight title
- Women's International Boxing Association World lightweight title

== Professional boxing record ==
19 fights	17 wins	2 losses
By knockout	9	1
By decision	8	1

No.	Result	Record	Opponent	Type	Round, time	Date	Location	Notes
19	Win		(Australia) Arlene Blencowe	UD		21 Nov 2014	WA Italian Club, Perth, Western Australia	vacant Women's International Boxing Association World lightweight title
18	Win		(Thailand) Siriwan Thongmanit	TKO		19 Jul 2014	WA Italian Club, Perth, Western Australia	
17	Win		(Thailand) Siriphon Chanbuala	TKO		22 Mar 2014	Kingsway Indoor Stadium, Madeley, Western Australia	
16	Loss		(Belgium) Delfine Persoon	TKO		21 Sep 2012	Lotto Arena, Antwerpen, Antwerpen, Belgium	vacant IBF World female lightweight title
15	Loss		(Argentina) Monica Silvina Acosta	MD		9 Sep 2011	Club Estudiantes, Santa Rosa, La Pampa, Argentina	WBC World female super lightweight title
14	Win		(Australia) Lyndsey Scragg	UD		10 Oct 2010	Joondalup Arena, Joondalup, Western Australia	vacant WBO World female lightweight title
13	Win		(Australia) Christina Tai	UD		22 Apr 2010	Queen Elizabeth Youth Centre, Tauranga, New Zealand	
12	Win		(United States) Angela Rivera-Parr	UD		18 Mar 2010	Racecourse - Atrium Room, Flemington, Victoria, Australia	
11	Win		(United States) Angela Rivera-Parr	UD		27 Jul 2009	Racecourse - Atrium Room, Flemington, Victoria, Australia	
10	Win		(Australia) Eileen Forrest	UD		10 Jul 2009	Joondalup Arena, Joondalup, Western Australia	
9	Win		(Australia) Sarah Howett	UD		8 May 2009	State Netball & Hockey Centre, Parkville, Victoria, Australia	
8	Win		(Thailand) Saisamon Sor Saitong	TKO		11 Oct 2008	Perth Convention Centre, Perth, Western Australia	
7	Win		(Australia) Christina Tai	TKO		18 Jun 2008	WA Italian Club, Perth, Western Australia	vacant PABA female super featherweight title
6	Win		(Thailand) Kwanpirom Muangroi-ed	KO		4 May 2008	Goldfields Oasis Recreation Centre, Kalgoorlie, Western Australia	vacant PABA female lightweight title
5	Win		(Australia) Lamduan Superchamps	TKO		16 Mar 2008	WA Italian Club, Perth, Western Australia	
4	Win		(Thailand) Nongju Sor Supinya	TKO		23 Nov 2007	WA Italian Club, Perth, Western Australia	
3	Win		(United States) Angela Rivera-Parr	UD		19 Aug 2007	WA Italian Club, Perth, Western Australia	
2	Win		(Thailand) Nong Tak Sakrungruang	UD		23 Jun 2007	WA Italian Club, Perth, Western Australia	
1	Win		(Thailand) Chuthaporn Pradissan	TKO		28 Apr 2007	Lords Sports Club, Subiaco, Perth, Western Australia	
