= Alexandrion Group =

Romanian spirits distributor

- Company type: Limited liability company
- Industry: Wines and spirits distribution
- Founded: 1994
- Founder: Nawaf Salameh
- Headquarters: Bucharest, Romania, Romania
- Area served: Romania
- Website: alexandriongroup.com

Alexandrion Group is the largest producer and distributor of spirits and wines in Romania. The group owns the Alexandrion Distilleries and The Iconic Estate Winery.

In 2003 Alexandrion Group established the Alexandrion Foundation through which it carries out social responsibility projects and humanitarian actions. The Alexandrion Foundation supports culture and sport by offering awards to personalities in the field of culture and sports, during the annual events Constantin Brâncoveanu Awards Gala, Matei Brâncoveanu Awards Gala and Alexandrion Trophies Gala.

On 21 April, 2025, Syrian-born founder and CEO Nawaf Salameh died.
