= Lisa King =

New Zealand social entrepreneur

Lisa King is a New Zealand social entrepreneur. In 2016 she won the New Zealand Women of Influence Award for business enterprise.

== Biography ==
King's parents emigrated to New Zealand from China and ran businesses such as a restaurant and an acupuncturist clinic.

She spent 15 years working in corporate marketing in large businesses such as Unilever, Fonterra, Heinz Watties and Cadbury's. In 2015, King launched Eat My Lunch, a social enterprise which provides free lunches to children in low-income schools.

In 2016, she won the New Zealand Women of Influence Award for business enterprise. In 2019, King was named New Zealand's Woman Entrepreneur of the Year.

In 2020, she founded AF Drinks, an alcohol-free beverage company.
