= Annalisa Bucci =

Italian kickboxer and mixed martial arts fighter

- Born: January 29, 1983 (age 43); Fabriano, Italy
- Other names: No Fear
- Nationality: (Italy) Italian
- Height: 5 ft 7 in (1.70 m)
- Weight: 140 lb (64 kg; 10 st)
- Division: Featherweight
- Reach: 70.0 in (178 cm)
- Style: Boxing, Muay Thai
- Stance: Southpaw
- Team: Palestra Athletic Thai Gym Rimini
- Trainer: Fabio Corelli
- Years active: 2006 - present

Kickboxing record
- Total: 42
- Wins: 29
- Losses: 11
- Draws: 2

Mixed martial arts record
- Total: 11
- Wins: 7
- By knockout: 2
- By submission: 3
- By decision: 2
- Losses: 4
- By submission: 2
- By decision: 2

Other information
- Website: http://www.lisanofear.com/
- Mixed martial arts record from Sherdog

Annalisa Bucci (born January 29, 1983) is an Italian female kickboxer and mixed martial artist, based in Rimini. She has competed professionally since 2005 and is the currently competing in the Bellator Featherweight division and in the SUPERKOMBAT Lightweight division.

She is the former WAKO Kickboxing and ISKA Muay Thai World Champion.

Combat Press ranked her as a top ten MMA women's featherweight between September 2014 and January 2017.

== Martial arts career ==
=== Kickboxing and Muay Thai ===
Annalisa Bucci made her kickboxing debut against Arianna Leonardi on the Italian regional scene, and won her first professional bout.

In 2007 she defeated Gabriella Carmelita to win an Italian National Amateur Championship.

In 2009 she scored a TKO win over Chantal Ughi to win the WMTI Intercontinental Thai Boxing Title.

Bucci won the European WAKO Pro K1 title through a decision win over Najat Hasnouni-Alaoui.

She unsuccessfully challenged Kerry Louise for the WFKKO World title, losing a unanimous decision.

She entered the 2012 WAKO European Pro Tournament. Despite defeating Dilek Yucel in the semi-finals, she lost to Boglaka Brunner in the final match.

She captured the ISKA Muay Thai World Title with a decision win over Stacey Parker.

=== Mixed martial arts ===
Bucci made her MMA debut during Dangerous Zone, in 2010, winning through a first round TKO.

She lost her next two fight against Slavka Vitaly, through an armbar, and against Myriam Lamare by unanimous decision.

Over the next two years she amassed a 6-1 record, with four of those six wins ending with a finish.

She made her Bellator MMA debut in 2014, during Bellator 130, but lost in the third round by a rear naked choke.

== Titles ==
- 2015 – WTKA European Muay Thai title, 66 kg
- 2013 – ISKA World Title, Full Contact, 64.5 kg
- 2011 – WAKO Pro European K1 Title
- 2009 – WMTI Intercontinental Thai Boxing Title, 65 kg
- 2007 – Italian Amateur K1 Title

== Kickboxing record ==
Professional kickboxing record
29 wins, 11 losses, 2 draws
Date	Result	Opponent	Event	Location	Method	Round
2015-04-11	Win	(Italy) Chantal Ughi		Ancona, Italy	Decision (split)	3
vacant WTKA European title • 66kg
2015-03-07	Win	(Romania) Cristiana Stancu	SUPERKOMBAT World Grand Prix I 2015	Ploiești, Romania	Decision	3
2013-04-20	Win	(England) Stacey Parker	World Championship Kickboxing	Stevenage, England	?	3
Wins the ISKA World title
2015-03-22	Loss	(France) Claire Musani	WMF World Championship	Bangkok, Thailand	Decision	3
For the WMF World title
2013-02-23	Win	(Italy) Katia Currò	?	Italy	KO	2
2011-12-18	Win	(Belgium) Najat Hasnouni-Alaoui	KING OF THE RING	Rimini, Italy	Decision (Unanimous)	3
For the WAKO European K1 title
2010-12-29	Loss	(Hungary) Boglaka Brunner	WAKO European Championship	Ankara, Turkey	Decision (Unanimous)	3
For the WAKO European title
2010-12-27	Win	(Turkey) Dilek Yucel	World Championship Kickboxing	Ankara, Turkey	Decision (Unanimous)	3
WAKO European Championship Semi-finals
2009-03-25	Win	(Italy) Chantal Ughi	?	Milan, Italy	TKO (Doctor Stoppage)	3
For the WMTI Intercontinental Thai Boxing Title.
2007-12-28	Draw	(Netherlands) Myriam Lamare	PFC 4	Marseille, France	Decision (Unanimous)	3
2006-12-23	Loss	(England) Kerry Louise	WFKKO	Stanley, England	Decision (Unanimous)	3
For the WFKKO World title.
Legend: Win Loss Draw/No contest Notes

== Mixed martial arts record ==
Professional record breakdown
10 matches	6 wins	4 losses
By knockout	2	0
By submission	2	2
By decision	2	2

Res.	Record	Opponent	Method	Event	Date	Round	Time	Location	Notes
Loss	7–4	Marloes Coenen	Submission (Rear-Naked Choke)	Bellator 130	October 24, 2014	3	0:57	Kansas, United States	
Win	7–3	Maria Hougaard Djursaa	Decision (Unanimous)	European MMA 9: Mark Your Time	May 24, 2014	3	5:00	Copenhagen, Denmark	
Loss	6–3	Pannie Kianzad	Decision (Unanimous)	Superior Challenge 10	May 3, 2014	3	5:00	Helsingborg, Sweden	
Win	6–2	Minerva Montero	Decision (Unanimous)	Shooto Italy: King of the Ring 3	December 15, 2013	2	5:00	Rimini, Italy	
Win	5–2	Jasmina Nadj	Submission (Rear-Naked Choke)	Shooto Italy: King of the Ring 2	December 9, 2013	1		Rimini, Italy	
Win	4–2	Angelica Babbi	Submission (Rear-Naked Choke)	Janus Fight Night 2012: In The Cage	December 30, 2012	1		Veneto, Italy	
Win	3–2	Lenka Smetankova	TKO (Punches)	MMAA Arena 1	September 30, 2012	2	1:37	Prague, Czech Republic	
Win	2–2	Anita Torti	Submission (Rear-Naked Choke)	Milano in the Cage 2	April 21, 2012	1	3:50	Milan, Italy	
Loss	1–2	Myriam Lamare	Decision (Unanimous)	Pancrase FC 4	April 14, 2012	2	5:00	Marseille, France	
Loss	1–1	Slavka Vitaly	Submission (Armbar)	MMA Italy: Strong and Unbreakable Round 1	March 10, 2012	1	4:00	Tuscany, Italy	
Win	1–0	Elisa Navalesi	TKO (Punches)	Dangerous Zone	May 16, 2010	1		Tuscany, Italy	

== See also ==
- List of female kickboxers
- List of female mixed martial artists
