= Chantal Ughi =

Italian actor

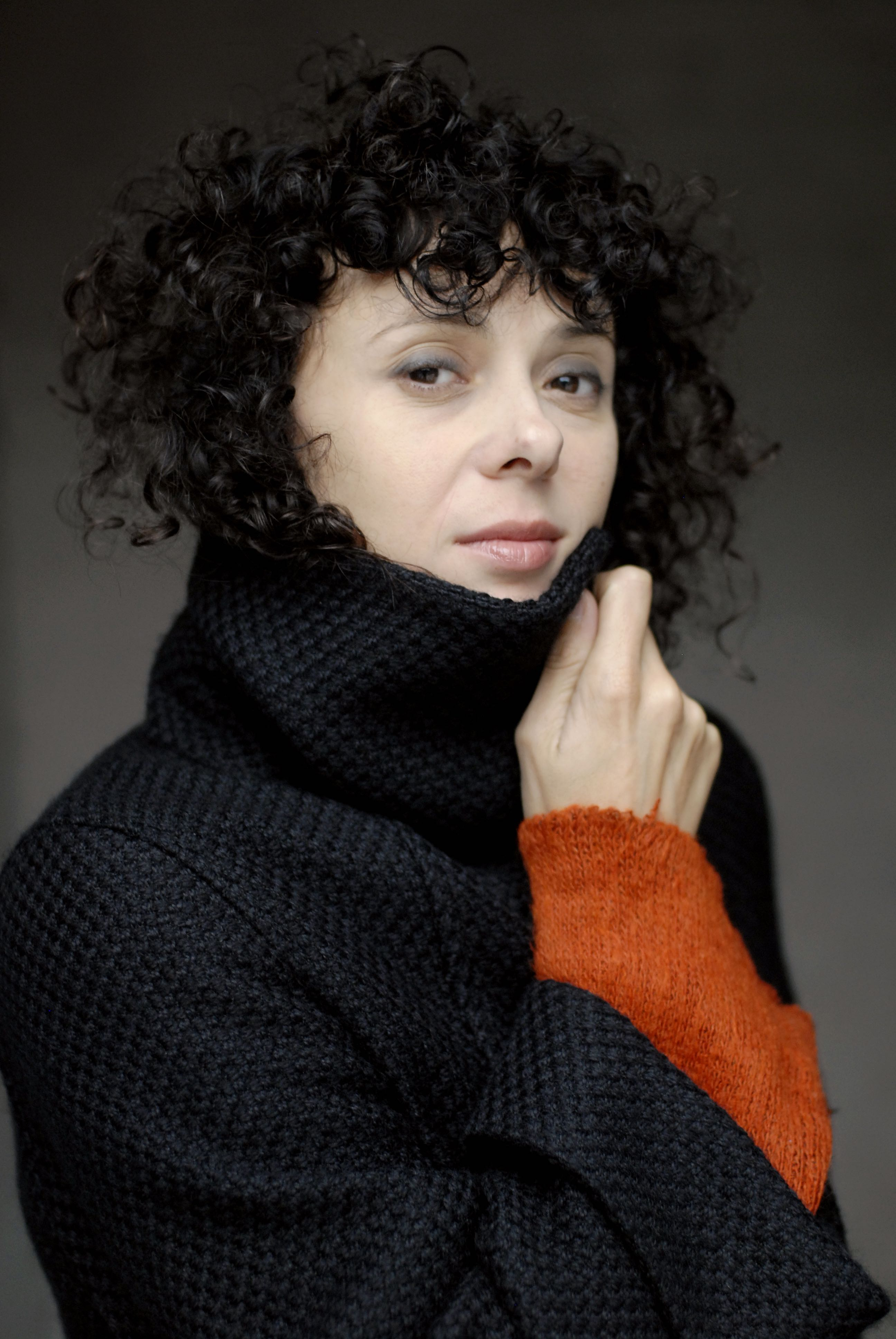
- Ughi in 2007
- Born: December 17, 1981 (age 44); Milan, Italy
- Other names: Janthra
- Nationality: Italian
- Height: 5 ft 10 in (1.78 m)
- Weight: 140 lb (64 kg; 10 st)
- Division: Super Lightweight
- Reach: 70.0 in (178 cm)
- Style: Boxing, Muay Thai
- Stance: Orthodox
- Fighting out of: Milan, Italy
- Team: Lottatori Milano
- Trainer: Diego Voltolin
- Rank: certified Muay Thai kru 12th khan by National stadium, Bangkok
- Years active: 2005–present (Kickboxing)

Professional boxing record
- Total: 2
- Losses: 2

Kickboxing record
- Total: 68
- Wins: 45
- By knockout: 18
- Losses: 22
- Draws: 1

Other information
- Website: https://twitter.com/chantalughi
- Boxing record from BoxRec

Chantal Ughi (born December 17, 1981) is an Italian and American female kickboxer, actress and multiple Muay Thai champion.

Ughi started training Muay Thai in New York aged 20, and in January 2008 left her acting career in the United States to become a full-time Muay Thai fighter in Thailand. She has since spoken out about the difficulties of being a female in a sport run by men, as well as her experiences of traveling to Thailand alone as a girl to train and compete in Muay Thai. Chantal Ughi is a seven-time world champion in the sport.

In 2014, Ughi returned to Italy to resume her acting career and was the subject matter and lead actress in the 2015 documentary Goodbye Darling I'm Off to Fight! (original in Italian: Ciao amore vado a combattere!), directed by Simone Manetti and produced by Alfredo Covelli, where she played herself.

== Filmography ==
Film
Year	Title	Role	Notes
1996	Traveling Companion	Maria	
1996	Growing Artichokes in Mimongo	Chantal	
1997	Albania Blues	Aida	
1998	Abbiamo Solo Fatto L'Amore	Corinna	
2001	The Big Apple	Jackie	
2016	Goodbye Darling, I'm Off to Fight	Herself	
2017	All the Money in the World	Villager woman	
2018	I Wanted Our Summer	Erika	
2020	El Plebeyo	Dona Zucarello	

| |- |2023 |Napoli New York |shop vendor New York | |}

== Acting career ==
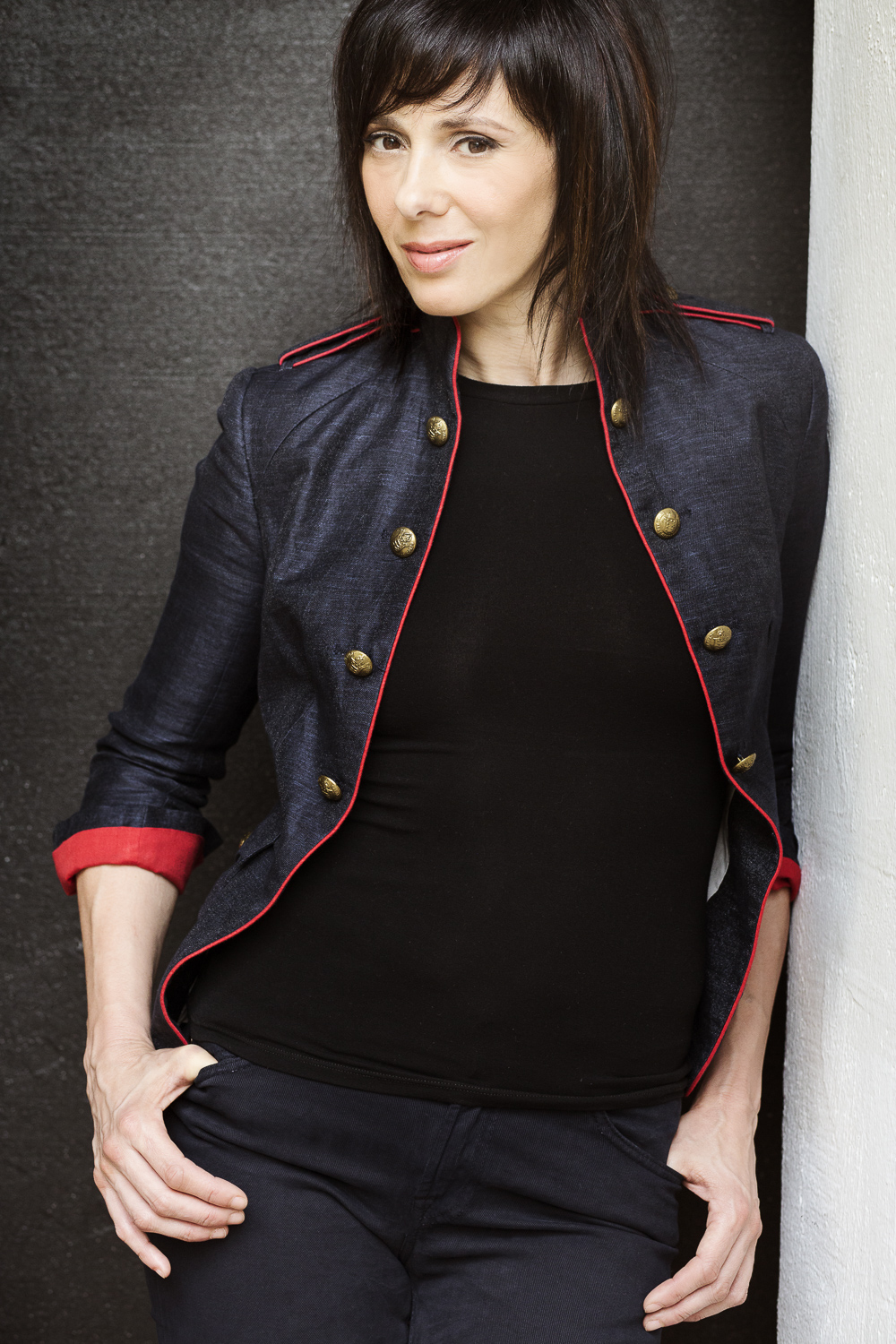
Ughi in 2015

Actress, director, singer and photographer, Ughi studied piano and followed her family relative Uto Ughi a violin player, at an early age. She then started modeling and traveling Europe, Paris, London, Madrid and Tokyo, Japan. At the same time she pursued her passion for acting and photography.

Ughi soon moved to Rome where she got her first acting role in the movie Traveling Companion, starring Asia Argento and French actor Michel Piccoli (official selection at the Cannes International Film Festival).

She quickly became the muse of many European film directors such as Peter Del Monte, Citto Maselli, Giuseppe Piccioni, Fulvio Ottaviano. She showcased her talent in both drama and comedy movies through many leading and supporting roles in internationally acclaimed European and Italian movies like Not Of This World, starring Margherita Buy and Silvio Orlando (a United Artists release and winner of the Montreal World Film Festival and the AFI Los Angeles Film Festival), Love in The Mirror starring Peter Stormare (Dancer In The Dark), the Italian Academy Award Winner Growing Artichocks in Mimongo, the critically acclaimed comedy But We Only Made Love, where she plays Corinna, and Albania Blues, as Aida.

After an intensive Shakespeare program at the Royal Academy of Dramatic Art (RADA) in London, Chantal decided to move to New York City, where she immediately landed a leading role in the romantic comedy The Big Apple, aka Freax and the City which she also help produce. In New York her debut film La Mia Mano Destra (My Right Hand) won for Best Short at the Brooklyn International Film Festival.

Goodbye Darling I'm Off To Fight (Ciao Amore Vado a combattere!) directed by Simone Manetti and Produced by Alfredo Covelli, where Ughi plays herself, was won Best Italian Documentary Prize and Jury Special Mention Prize at the prestigious 2016 Biografilm Festival in Bologna, Italy, as well as Best Documentary at Molise Cinema and many other prizes. It was also nominated for Italian Nastri D'Argento 2017. It was released in movie theatres all around Italy in 2017 by I Wonder Pictures.

In 2016, Chantal played the lead role in Fiorella Mannoia's music video to "Nessuna Conseguenza" (No consequences), highlighting the continued relevance of violence against women and domestic abuse.

== Muay Thai Career ==
Chantal Ughi began fighting Muay Thai professionally in 2008. She is a seven-time world champion in the sport. She won her first Muay World title the WPMF against Carly Giumulli on Dec. 5th 2008, during the King of Thailand's Birthday celebration in Bangkok, in front of 100.000 people. Chantal Ughi has fought Miriam Nakamoto for the WBC, Julie Kitchen for her WPMF title defense, Stephanie Ielö Page for the WMA and Eileen Forrest for the ISKA titles.

=== Championships and Accomplishments ===
- World Professional Muaythai Federation
  - WPMF World Welterweight Championship (147 lbs)
    - One title defense against Julie Kitchen
- World Muaythai Association
  - WMA World Super Lightweight Championship (140 lbs)
- World Muaythai Federation
  - WMF World Super Lightweight Championship (140 lbs)
  - WMF World Welterweight Championship (147 lbs)
  - WMF World Welterweight Amateur Championship (147 lbs)
- World Taekwondo Kickboxing Association
  - WTKA World Welterweight Amateur Championship (147 lbs)
- World Muaythai Organization
  - WMO World Super Lightweight Championship (140 lbs)
  - WMO Welterweight Championship (147 pounds
- Muaythai Premiere League
  - Runner up 63.5 kg. (140 lbs.) SuperLightweight division

=== Titles ===
- 2015 - WMO World Champion 63.5 Kg.
- 2014 - World Muay Thai Federation(WMF) Pro Am World Champion 63.5 kg.
- 2014 - World Muay Thai Federation(WMF) Amateur World Champion 66 kg.
- 2012 – WMF Pro AM World Champion 66 kg (1 defense)
- 2010 – WMF World Championship (Bronze)
- 2009 – WMA World Champion 63.5 kg
- 2009 – Patong Stadium PK1 Champion (1 defense)
- 2008 – WMF World championship, Prince's Cup 67 kg (Gold)
- 2008 – WPMF World Champion 67 kg
- 2008 – WTKA K1 Division Amateur World Champion 67 kg
- 2008 – WTKA Muay Thai Division Amateur World Champion 67 kg
- 2008 – WKA North American Amateur Champion 67 kg

=== Record ===
Kickboxing Record
45 Wins (18 (T)KO, 27 decisions), 22 Loss, 0 Draws
Date	Result	Opponent	Event	Location	Method	Round	Time	Record
April 11, 2015	Loss	(Italy) Annalisa Bucci		Ancona, Italy	Split Decision	2	3:00	
vacant WTKA European title • 66kg
March 19, 2015	Win	(Chile) Daniellea Callejas				3	3:00	
vacant WMO World title
November 19, 2013	Loss	(Netherlands) Jorina Baars	Lion Fight 20	Mashantucket, Connecticut, United States	TKO	1	2:35	
December 19, 2010	Loss	(United States) Miriam Nakamoto	WCK Muay Thai	Haikou City, Hainan Island, China	Decision (unanimous)	5	2:00	
Fought for WBC World Title.
January 10, 2011	Loss	(Kyrgyzstan) Antonina Shevchenko		Koh Samui Petch Booncha Stadium, Thailand	Unanimous Decision	4	2:00	
October 30, 2010	Loss	(Australia) Eileen Forrest	Warriors at War	Brisbane, Australia	Decision	5	3:00	
Fought for ISKA World Title.
December 23, 2009	Win	(France) Stephanie Ielö Page		MBK, Bangkok, Thailand	Unanimous Decision	3	3:00	
Fought for WMA World Title.
April 8, 2009	Loss	(England) Julie Kitchen		MBK Center, Bangkok, Thailand	Unanimous Decision	5	3:00	
WPMF title defense.
March 30, 2009	Win	(Canada) Lindsey Hofstrand		Patong Stadium, Phuket, Thailand		3	3:00	
February 6, 2009	Win	(Thailand) Namwan		Patong Stadium, Phuket, Thailand		3	3:00	
WIN vacant Stadium title
December 5, 2008	Win	(Thailand)		Patong Stadium, Phuket, Thailand		3	3:00	
December 5, 2008	Win	(Australia) Carly Giumulli		King's Birthday, Sanam Luang, Bangkok, Thailand		3	3:00	
WIN vacant WPMF World title
August 2, 2008	Win	(Turkey) Gulistan		(Turkey) WMF Prince's Cup, Bangkok, Thailand		3	3:00	
vacant WMF Amateur World title
October 28, 2008	Win	(South Africa) Zelda		WTKA World Championship, Italy		3	3:00	
vacant WTKA World Amateur title
October 28, 2008	Win	(Finland) Kelly		WTKA World Championships, Italy		3	3:00	
vacant WTKA Amateur Kickboxing World title
September 22, 2008	Win	(Thailand) Nongnane Jorguun gym		Patong Stadium, Phuket, Thailand		3	3:00	
vacant PK1 Stadium Title
September 15, 2008	Win	(Thailand) Surat Thani		Patong Stadium, Thailand		3	3:00	
June 15, 2008	Win	(United States)		(United States) WKA North American Championships, Virginia, USA		3	3:00	
WKA title
May 29, 2008	Win	(Thailand) Kwanfa		Kata Stadium, Phuket, Thailand		3	3:00	
April 29, 2008	Win	(Thailand) Nonganne		Bangla Boxing Stadium, Phuket Thailand		3	3:00	
January 14, 2008	Win	(Thailand)		Lokroi Stadium, Chiang Mai, Thailand		3	3:00	
Legend: Win Loss Draw/No contest Notes

=== Professional Boxing Record ===
No.	Result	Record	Opponent	Type	Round, time	Date	Location	Notes
2	Loss	0–0–2	(Sweden) Mikaela Laurén	KO	1 (6), 1:50	Feb 2, 2012	The Aviation Club, Dubai, United Arab Emirates	
1	Loss	0–0–1	(Thailand) Siriphon Chanbuala	PTS	6	Feb 4, 2011	Bang Khen, Bangkok, Thailand	
