= Weyauwega International Film Festival =

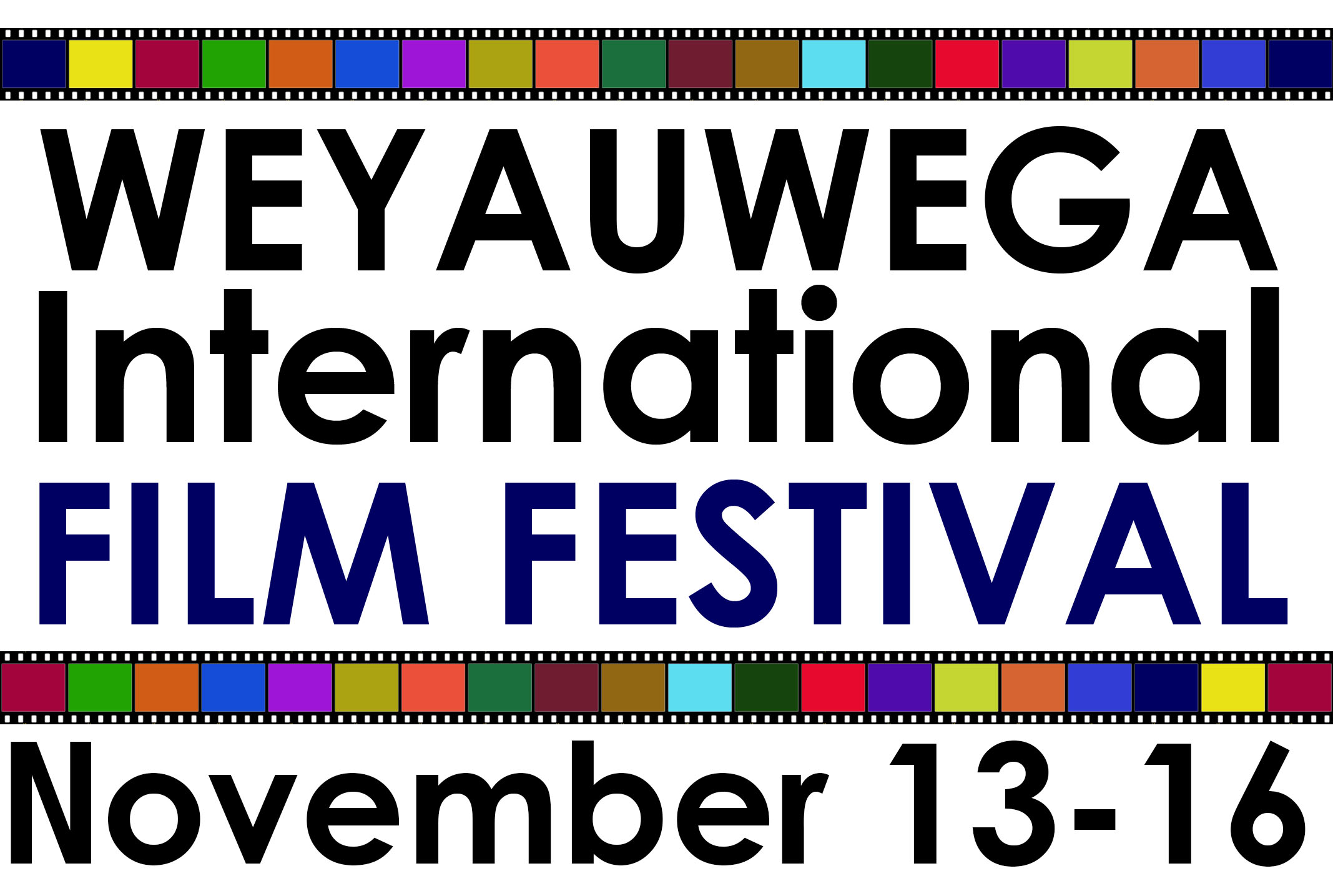
- Location: Weyauwega, Wisconsin, United States
- Founded: 2011
- Language: International
- Website: wegafilm.com

The Weyauwega International Film Festival (WIFF), a program of Wega Arts, takes place annually in Weyauwega, Wisconsin. It is held in November at the Gerold Opera House at 136 East Main Street in Weyauwega, Wisconsin. It is a showcase for new work from American and international independent filmmakers. The festival also features at least one classic film. The festival consists of competitive sections for American and international dramatic and documentary films, both feature films and short films. A jury selects the top films in each category for which the directors are awarded Gerold Awards. The 2019 Weyauwega International Film Festival will be held November 13 through November 16. The festival has been presented annually since 2011.
