= List of Bellator MMA alumni =

This is a list of former employees of the professional mixed martial arts promotion Bellator MMA (previously known as Bellator Fighting Championship). The fighters are listed in order by weight class.

== Alumni ==
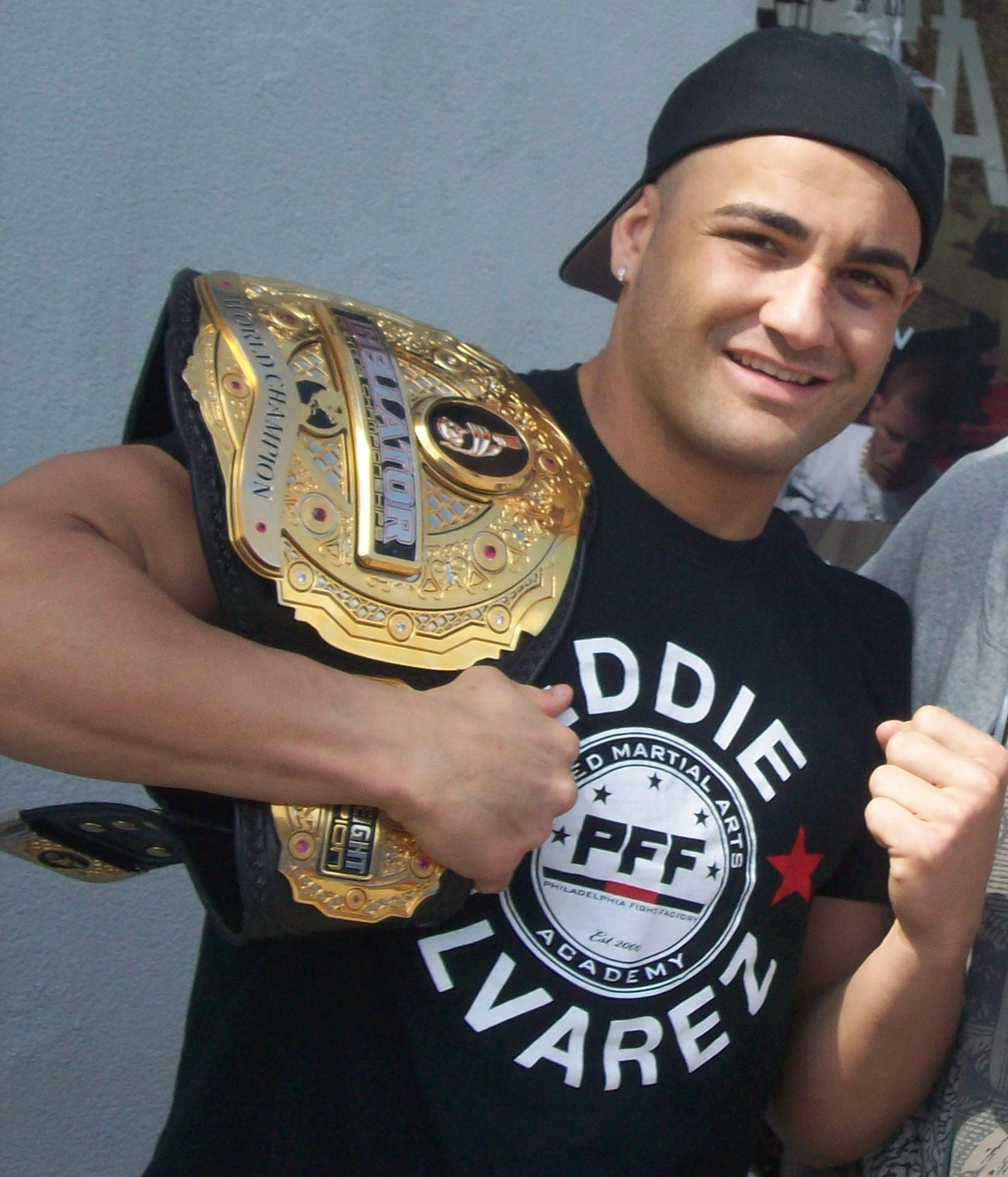
Eddie Alvarez

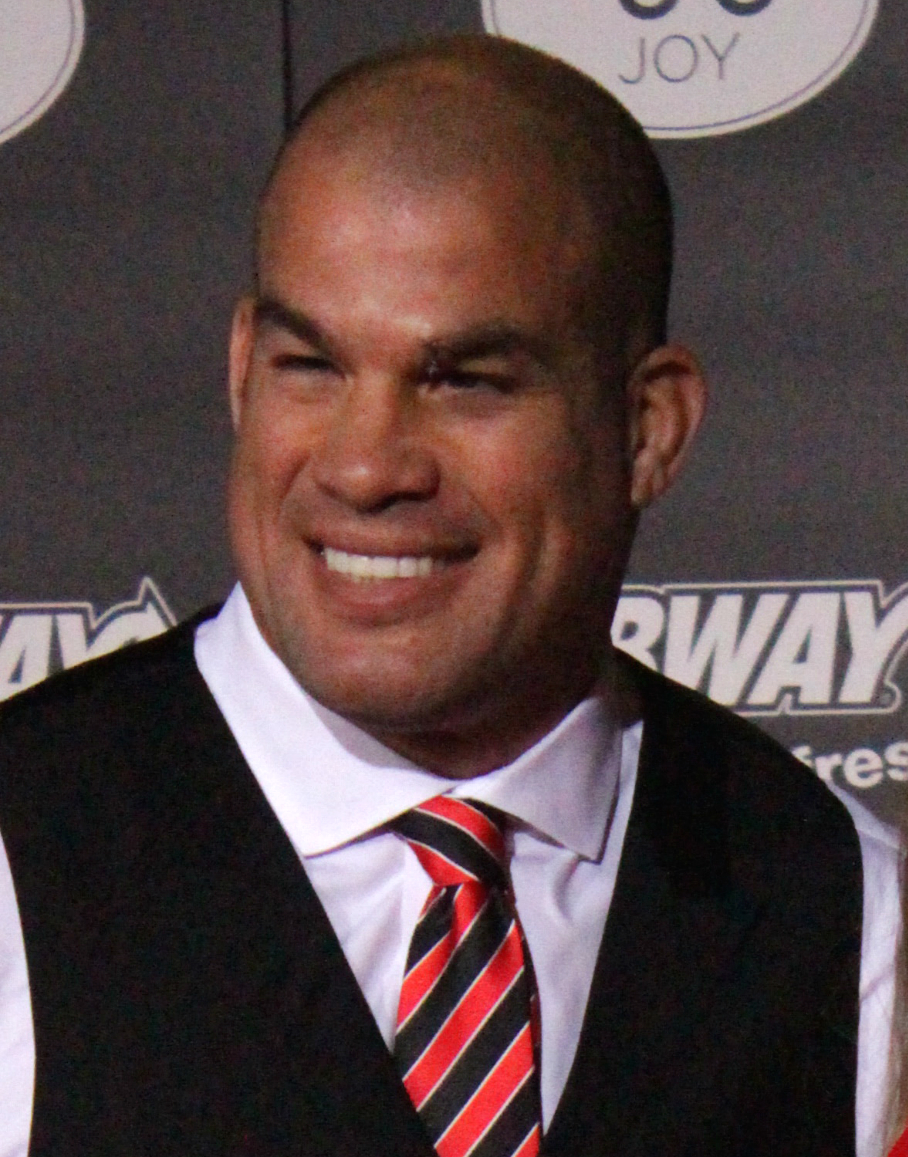
Tito Ortiz

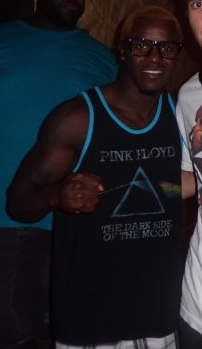
Melvin Guillard

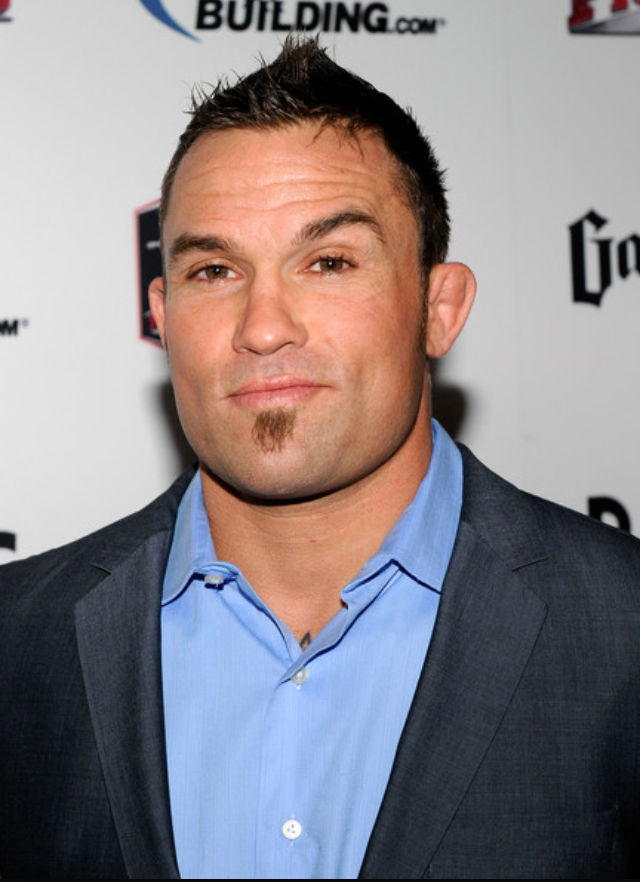
Rob McCullough

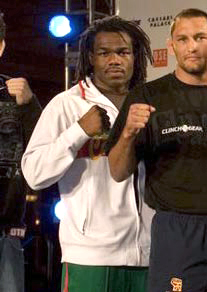
Rameau Thierry Sokoudjou

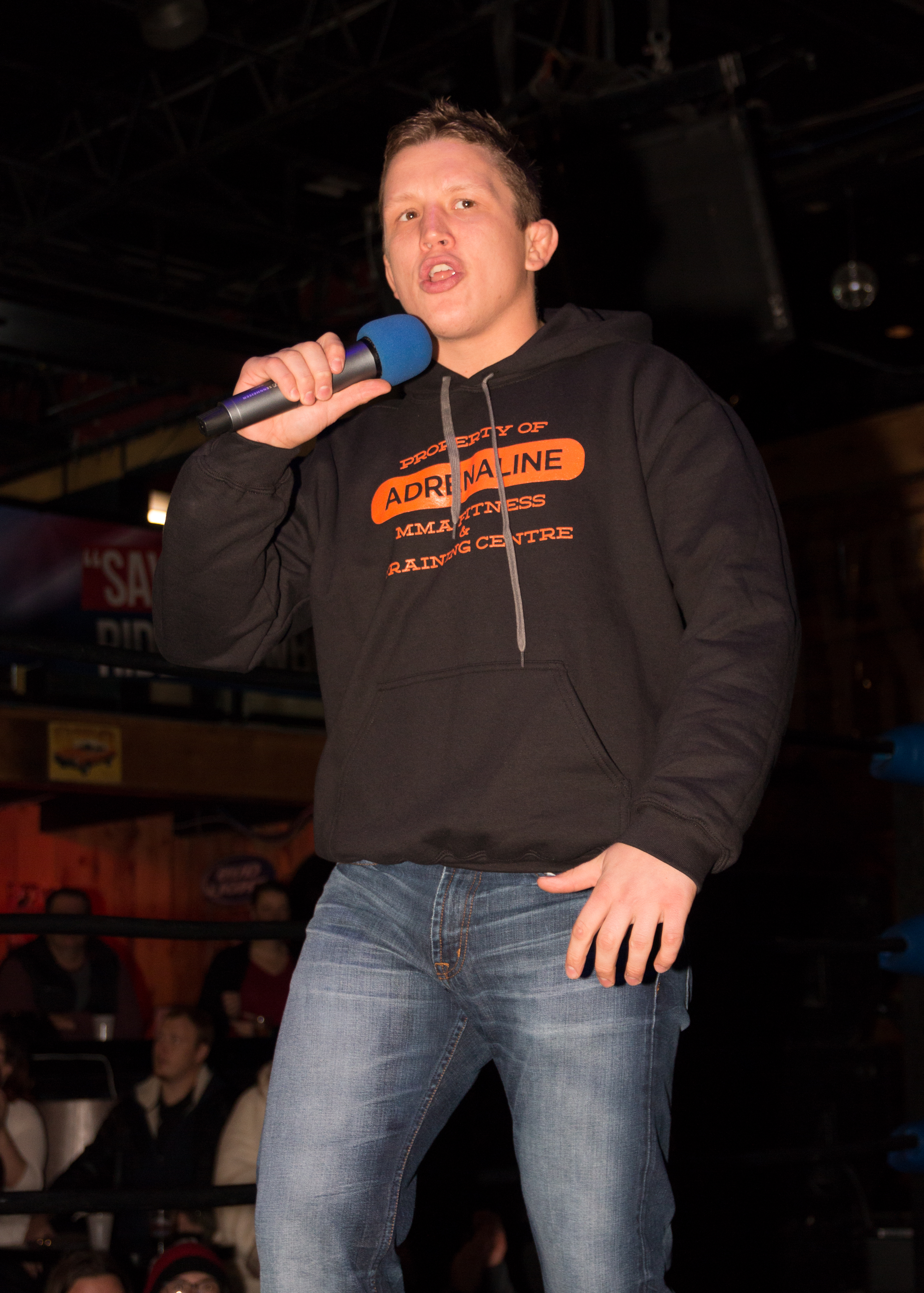
Chris Horodecki

	Name	Weight class	Bellator record	Ref
United States	Cole Konrad	Heavyweight	7–0	
United States	Bobby Lashley	Heavyweight	5–0	
Russia	Vitaly Minakov	Heavyweight	5–0	
Croatia	Mirko Filipović	Heavyweight	1–0	
(The Bahamas)	Kimbo Slice	Heavyweight	1–0 (1)	
United States	Nick Rossborough	Heavyweight	1–0–1	
Bulgaria	Blagoy Ivanov	Heavyweight	6–1	
Russia	Alexander Volkov	Heavyweight	6–3	
United States	Raphael Butler	Heavyweight	4–2–1	
United States	Tony Johnson	Heavyweight	3–1	
American Samoa	Mighty Mo	Heavyweight	3–1	
United States	Shawn Jordan	Heavyweight	3–1	
Brazil	Thiago Santos	Heavyweight	3–2 (1)	
United States	Dan Charles	Heavyweight	3–3–1	
United States	Ron Sparks	Heavyweight	3–3	
United States	Mark Holata	Heavyweight	3–3	
South Africa	Neil Grove	Heavyweight	3–4	
United States	Ryan Martinez	Heavyweight	3–4	
United States	Eric Prindle	Heavyweight	3–5 (1)	
United States	Eddie Sanchez	Heavyweight	2–1	
United States	Brett Rogers	Heavyweight	1–1	
Australia	Peter Graham	Heavyweight	1–2	
United States	Lavar Johnson	Heavyweight	1–3	
England	Mark Godbeer	Heavyweight	0–1	
United States	Derrick Mehmen	Heavyweight	0–1	
United States	Paul Buentello	Heavyweight	0–1	
United States	Ricco Rodriguez	Heavyweight	0–1	
United States	Derrick Lewis	Heavyweight	0–1	
United States	Sherman Pendergarst	Heavyweight	0–1	
United States	Josh Burns	Heavyweight	0–6	
(The Bahamas)	Dada 5000	Heavyweight	0–0 (1)	
United States	Rich Hale	Heavyweight; Light Heavyweight	6–4	
United States	Travis Wiuff	Heavyweight; Light Heavyweight	4–2	
United States	Virgil Zwicker	Heavyweight; Light Heavyweight	4–2–1	
United States	Joey Beltran	Heavyweight; Light Heavyweight	3–5	
United States	Ken Shamrock	Heavyweight; Light Heavyweight	0–2	
Brazil	Royce Gracie	Light Heavyweight	1–0	
Slovakia	Attila Végh	Light Heavyweight	5–1	
United States	Tito Ortiz	Light Heavyweight	3–1	
United States	Kelly Anundson	Light Heavyweight	3–1	
Cameroon	Rameau Thierry Sokoudjou	Light Heavyweight	2–1	
United States	Emanuel Newton	Light Heavyweight	8–4	
France	Francis Carmont	Light Heavyweight	3–2	
Russia	Mikhail Zayats	Light Heavyweight	3–2	
United States	Jacob Noe	Light Heavyweight	3–2	
Democratic Republic of the Congo	Christian M'Pumbu	Light Heavyweight	3–4	
Belarus	Vladimir Matyushenko	Light Heavyweight	1–1	
United States	Rodney Wallance	Light Heavyweight	1–1	
United States	Aaron Rosa	Light Heavyweight	1–1	
United States	Houston Alexander	Light Heavyweight	1–2–1	
United States	Seth Petruzelli	Light Heavyweight	1–2	
United States	Razak Al-Hassan	Light Heavyweight	0–1	
United States	Stephan Bonnar	Light Heavyweight	0–1	
Brazil	Renato Sobral	Light Heavyweight	0–2	
United States	Joe Vedepo	Light Heavyweight; Middleweight	4–3	
United States	Anthony Ruiz	Light Heavyweight; Middleweight	0–2	
Cuba	Hector Lombard	Middleweight	8–0	
United States	Anthony Smith	Middleweight	2–0	
United States	David Branch	Middleweight	2–0	
United States	Tamdan McCrory	Middleweight	2–0	
United States	Louis Taylor	Middleweight	2–0	
Canada	Elias Theodorou	Middleweight	1–0	
Jamaica	Uriah Hall	Middleweight	1–0	
Canada	Nick Ring	Middleweight	1–0	
United States	Dan Cramer	Middleweight	8–2	
United States	Brandon Halsey	Middleweight	7–2	
United States	Doug Marshall	Middleweight	4–2	
United States	Bubba McDaniel	Middleweight	3–1	
Brazil	Maiquel Falcão	Middleweight	3–1	
United States	Perry Filkins	Middleweight	2–1	
United States	Eric Schambari	Middleweight	2–1	
Brazil	Vitor Vianna	Middleweight	2–2	
Denmark	Mikkel Parlo	Middleweight	4–3	
United States	Jared Hess	Middleweight	4–4	
United States	Kendall Grove	Middleweight	4–5	
Sweden	Andreas Spång	Middleweight	1–2	
United States	Joe Schilling	Middleweight	1–2	
United States	Sam Alvey	Middleweight	1–1	
Russia	Vyacheslav Vasilevsky	Middleweight	1–1	
United States	Jeremy Kimball	Middleweight	1–1	
United States	Josh Samman	Middleweight	0–1	
South Africa	Trevor Prangley	Middleweight	0–1	
United States	Matt Horwich	Middleweight	0–2	
United States	Bryan Baker	Middleweight; Welterweight	8–4	
United States	Bret Cooper	Middleweight; Welterweight	7–5	
France	Karl Amoussou	Middleweight; Welterweight	5–4	
United States	Nate James	Middleweight; Welterweight	1–1	
United States	Joe Riggs	Middleweight; Welterweight	1–1	
United States	Rudy Bears	Middleweight; Welterweight	2–7	
United States	Ben Askren	Welterweight	9–0	
Canada	Ryan Ford	Welterweight	2–0	
United States	Dom O'Grady	Welterweight	2–0	
United States	Kris McCray	Welterweight	1–0	
United States	Kenny Robertson	Welterweight	1–0	
United States	Brian Gassaway	Welterweight	1–0	
Brazil	Cristiano Souza	Welterweight	3–1	
United States	Jay Hieron	Welterweight	3–1	
United States	Adam McDonough	Welterweight	3–1	
United States	Paul Bradley	Welterweight	3–1 (1)	
France	Nordine Taleb	Welterweight	2–1	
United States	War Machine	Welterweight	2–1	
Dominican Republic	Omar de la Cruz	Welterweight	2–1	
United States	Lyman Good	Welterweight	8–3	
United States	Ben Saunders	Welterweight	7–3	
United States	Brent Weedman	Welterweight	8–4	
Lithuania	Marius Žaromskis	Welterweight	4–3	
United States	Dan Hornbuckle	Welterweight	3–3	
Armenia	Karo Parisyan	Welterweight	2–2	
United States	Steve Carl	Welterweight	2–2	
United States	Tyler Stinson	Welterweight	2–2	
Brazil	Luis Santos	Welterweight	2–2	
United States	Raul Amaya	Welterweight	2–2	
United States	Chris Lozano	Welterweight	2–3	
United States	Ron Keslar	Welterweight	2–3	
United States	Justin Baesman	Welterweight	1–2–1	
England	Jim Wallhead	Welterweight	1–2	
Brazil	Evangelista Santos	Welterweight	1–2	
United States	Nah-Shon Burrell	Welterweight	1–2	
United States	Ryan Thomas	Welterweight	1–3	
United States	Dante Rivera	Welterweight	1–1	
United States	Herman Terrado	Welterweight	0–1–1	
Brazil	Carlos Eduardo Rocha	Welterweight	0–1	
United States	Phil Baroni	Welterweight	0–1	
United States	John Kolosci	Welterweight	0–1	
Japan	Yoshiyuki Yoshida	Welterweight	0–1	
United States	Brian Warren	Welterweight	0–2	
United States	Jacob McClintock	Welterweight	0–2	
United States	Mike Bronzoulis	Welterweight; Lightweight	0–2	
United States	Rick Hawn	Welterweight; Lightweight	10–4	
United States	LaRue Burley	Lightweight	3–0	
Mexico	Efrain Escudero	Lightweight	2–0	
United States	Drew Dober	Lightweight	1–0	
United States	Eddie Alvarez	Lightweight	9–1	
United States	Will Brooks	Lightweight	9–1	
United States	Jorge Masvidal	Lightweight	2–1	
United States	Phillipe Nover	Lightweight	2–1	
Poland	Marcin Held	Lightweight	11–3	
United States	Dave Jansen	Lightweight	7–2	
United States	Toby Imada	Lightweight	5–3	
Russia	Alexander Sarnavskiy	Lightweight	5–3	
United States	Jason Fischer	Lightweight	4–3	
Brazil	Ricardo Tirloni	Lightweight	3–4	
United States	Carey Vanier	Lightweight	2–2	
United States	Rich Clementi	Lightweight	2–3	
United States	Lloyd Woodard	Lightweight	2–3	
United States	Roger Huerta	Lightweight	1–3	
Canada	John Alessio	Lightweight	1–1 (1)	
United States	Eric Reynolds	Lightweight	1–2	
United States	J. J. Ambrose	Lightweight	1–2	
United States	Waylon Lowe	Lightweight	1–1	
Canada	Mike Ricci	Lightweight	0–1	
Japan	Shinya Aoki	Lightweight	0–1	
Japan	Akihiro Gono	Lightweight	0–1	
United States	Kurt Pellegrino	Lightweight	0–1	
United States	Rob McCullough	Lightweight	0–1	
United States	Marcus Davis	Lightweight	0–1 (1)	
United States	Dakota Cochrane	Lightweight	0–2	
United States	Melvin Guillard	Lightweight	0–3 (1)	
United States	Josh Neer	Lightweight	0–3	
United States	Bubba Jenkins	Lightweight; Featherweight	8–3	
United States	Frank Caraballo	Lightweight; Featherweight	2–1	
Russia	Magomedrasul Khasbulaev	Featherweight	5–0	
United States	Rad Martinez	Featherweight	5–1	
United States	Joe Soto	Featherweight	4–1	
United States	Matt Bessette	Featherweight	7–2	
Brazil	Alexandre Bezerra	Featherweight	7–2	
Brazil	Marlon Sandro	Featherweight	8–3	
United States	Justin Wilcox	Featherweight	3–2	
Russia	Shahbulat Shamhalaev	Featherweight	3–2	
Peru	Luis Palomino	Featherweight	3–3	
United States	Kenny Foster	Featherweight	3–6	
Brazil	Saul Almeida	Featherweight	2–2	
Brazil	Wagnney Fabiano	Featherweight	1–1	
Russia	Akop Stepanyan	Featherweight	1–4	
United States	Jeremy Spoon	Featherweight	1–2	
United States	Mike Corey	Featherweight	1–1–1	
Canada	Chris Horodecki	Featherweight	1–2–1	
United States	Nam Phan	Featherweight	0–1	
United States	Donny Walker	Featherweight	0–1	
Brazil	Diego Nunes	Featherweight	0–2	
United States	Mike Richman	Featherweight; Bantamweight	7–5	
Brazil	Wilson Reis	Featherweight; Bantamweight	5–4	
England	Ronnie Mann	Featherweight; Bantamweight	3–3	
United States	Jimmie Rivera	Lightweight; Bantamweight	4–0	
United States	Anthony Birchak	Bantamweight	1–0	
United States	Rob Emerson	Bantamweight	2–1	
United States	Zach Makovsky	Bantamweight	6–2	
Brazil	Luis Nogueira	Bantamweight	5–2	
United States	Travis Marx	Bantamweight	3–2	
Brazil	Rafael Silva	Bantamweight	3–2	
United States	Ed West	Bantamweight	4–4	
United States	Anthony Leone	Bantamweight	3–4	
Cuba	Alexis Vila	Bantamweight	2–2	
United States	Chase Beebe	Bantamweight	2–2	
Brazil	Rodrigo Lima	Bantamweight	1–2	
United States	Bryan Goldsby	Bantamweight	1–3	
United States	Jeff Curran	Bantamweight	0–1	

== See also ==
- List of current Bellator fighters
- List of Bellator MMA records
- List of Bellator MMA champions
- List of Bellator MMA events
