= Omar de la Cruz =

Omar de la Cruz may refer to:

- Omar de la Cruz (fighter) (born 1979), Dominican fighter
- Omar de la Cruz (footballer) (born 2001), Dominican footballer

== See also ==
- Omar Cruz (born 1999), Mexican baseball player
