= 2009 in Bellator MMA =

Mixed martial arts events

- Genre: Sports
- Created by: Bjorn Rebney
- Country of origin: United States

Production
- Running time: 120 minutes

Original release
- Network: ESPN Deportes
- Release: April 3 – June 19, 2009

2009 in Bellator MMA was the first installment of the Bellator Fighting Championships (Bellator FC)-produced series. It started broadcasting April 3, 2009, through an exclusive television agreement with ESPN Deportes. The episodes had a one-day tape delay.

== Bellator 1 ==
Bellator 1
- Promotion: Bellator Fighting Championships
- Date: April 3, 2009
- Venue: Seminole Hard Rock Hotel & Casino Hollywood
- City: Hollywood, Florida, United States
- Attendance: 1,756

Event chronology
Bellator 1	Bellator 2

Bellator 1 was a mixed martial arts event by Bellator Fighting Championships. The event took place on Friday, April 3, 2009 at the Seminole Hard Rock Hotel & Casino in Hollywood, Florida. It was broadcast nationally in the U.S. via tape-delay the following night on Saturday, April 4, 2009 through an exclusive television agreement with ESPN Deportes.

The event featured quarter-final tournament bouts of the 2009 Featherweight (145 lb) and Lightweight (155 lb) Tournaments, along with a number of non-tournament bouts to be held in the organization's other weight divisions. All bouts were contested under the Unified Rules of Mixed Martial Arts.

Results

Lightweight Quarterfinals
Weight class				Method	Round	Time	Notes
Lightweight	Jorge Masvidal	def.	Nick Agallar	TKO (punches)	1	1:19
Lightweight	Eddie Alvarez	def.	Greg Loughran	Submission (guillotine choke)	1	2:44
Lightweight	Toby Imada	def.	Alonzo Martinez	Submission (rear-naked choke)	1	3:26
Featherweight Quarterfinals
Weight class				Method	Round	Time	Notes
Featherweight	Yahir Reyes	def.	Nick Gonzalez	Submission (rear-naked choke)	1	2:11
Featherweight	Estevan Payan	def.	Luis Palomino	Decision (split)	3	5:00
Featherweight	Joe Soto	def.	Ben Greer	TKO (punches)	1	3:40
Non-tournament bouts
Weight class				Method	Round	Time	Notes
Featherweight	Jonathan Brookins	def.	Stephen Ledbetter	Submission (rear-naked choke)	1	3:32
Lightweight	Lorenzo Borgomeo	def.	Daniel Morales	Submission (rear-naked choke)	3	3:46
Middleweight	James Brasco	def.	Kevin Abrante	Submission (armbar)	1	2:14
Middleweight	Moyses Gabin	def.	Chris Decaro	Submission (triangle choke)	1	1:33
Middleweight	Gary Padilla	def.	Daniel Sarafian	TKO (punches)	2	3:04

== Bellator 2 ==
Bellator 2
- Promotion: Bellator Fighting Championships
- Date: April 10, 2009
- Venue: Mohegan Sun
- City: Uncasville, Connecticut, United States
- Attendance: 1,283

Event chronology
Bellator 1	Bellator 2	Bellator 3

Bellator 2 was a mixed martial arts event by the promotion Bellator Fighting Championships. The event took place on Friday, April 10, 2009 at the Mohegan Sun in Uncasville, Connecticut. It was then broadcast nationally in the U.S. via tape-delay the following night on Saturday, April 11, 2009 through an exclusive television agreement with ESPN Deportes.

Background

The event featured the final quarter-final bouts of the 2009 Featherweight (145 lb) and Lightweight (155 lb) Tournaments, as well as, the quarter-final round of the Welterweight (170 lb) Tournament. A number of non-tournament bouts to be held in the organization's other weight divisions also took place. The evening's main event saw undefeated Henry Martinez square off against rising star Wilson Reis. All bouts were contested under the Unified Rules of Mixed Martial Arts.

Results

Featherweight Quarterfinals
Weight class				Method	Round	Time	Notes
Featherweight	Wilson Reis	def.	Henry Martinez	Decision (unanimous)	3	5:00
Lightweight Quarterfinals
Weight class				Method	Round	Time	Notes
Lightweight	Eric Reynolds	def.	Thomas Schulte	TKO (punches)	1	4:18
Welterweight Quarterfinals
Weight class				Method	Round	Time	Notes
Welterweight	Lyman Good	def.	Héctor Urbina	Technical Submission (rear-naked choke)	2	3:22
Welterweight	Jorge Ortiz	def.	Aaron Romero	Decision (unanimous)	3	5:00
Welterweight	Omar De La Cruz	def.	Victor Meza	Decision (unanimous)	3	5:00
Non-tournament bouts
Weight class				Method	Round	Time	Notes
Bantamweight	Jimmie Rivera	def.	Willie Gates	Submission (triangle choke)	3	3:22
Welterweight	Matt Makowski	def.	Aaron Tregear	Decision (unanimous)	3	5:00
Welterweight	Jesse Juarez	def.	Mikey Gomez	TKO (punches)	1	4:23
Featherweight	Josh LaBerge	def.	Chris Simmons	Decision (unanimous)	3	5:00

== Bellator 3 ==
Bellator 3
- Promotion: Bellator Fighting Championships
- Date: April 17, 2009
- Venue: Lloyd Noble Center
- City: Norman, Oklahoma, United States
- Attendance: 4,297

Event chronology
Bellator 2	Bellator 3	Bellator 4

Bellator 3 and Bellator IV were two episodes of the mixed martial arts promotion, Bellator Fighting Championships, created from a single event. The event took place on Friday, April 17, 2009 at the Lloyd Noble Center in Norman, Oklahoma.

Background

Bellator IV was originally scheduled for Montreal, however regulatory issues prevented the event from being held there. Each episode featured half of the bouts from the third Bellator event. Bellator III aired nationally in the U.S. via tape-delay the following night on Saturday, April 18, 2009 through an exclusive television agreement with ESPN Deportes. Bellator IV aired on Saturday, April 25, 2009.

Results

Middleweight Quarterfinals
Weight class				Method	Round	Time	Notes
Middleweight	Hector Lombard	def.	Virgil Lozano	KO (punch)	1	1:10
Middleweight	Yosmany Cabezas	def.	Edwin Aguilar	Submission (armbar)	1	4:31
Middleweight Tournament Alternate bout
Weight class				Method	Round	Time	Notes
Middleweight	Marcelo Alfaya	def.	Joey Gorczynski	TKO (punches)	1	1:32
Non-tournament bouts
Weight class				Method	Round	Time	Notes
Featherweight	Johnny Eduardo	def.	Donald Sanchez	Decision (unanimous)	3	5:00
Light Heavyweight	Rudy Lindsay	def.	Wayne Cole	TKO (punches)	2	3:37

== Bellator 4 ==
Bellator 4
- Promotion: Bellator Fighting Championships
- Date: April 17, 2009
- Venue: Lloyd Noble Center
- City: Norman, Oklahoma, United States
- Attendance: 3,850

Event chronology
Bellator 3	Bellator 4	Bellator 5

Results

Middleweight Quarterfinals
Weight class				Method	Round	Time	Notes
Middleweight	Damien Stelly	def.	Alex Andrade	Decision (unanimous)	3	5:00
Middleweight	Jared Hess	def.	Daniel Tabera	submission (rear-naked choke)	1	2:34
Welterweight Quarterfinals
Weight class				Method	Round	Time	Notes
Welterweight	Dave Menne	def.	Norman Paraisy	Submission (rear-naked choke)	3	2:39
Middleweight Tournament Alternate bout
Weight class				Method	Round	Time	Notes
Middleweight	Jason Norwood	def.	John Kirk	Submission (rear-naked choke)	2	1:52
Non-tournament bouts
Weight class				Method	Round	Time	Notes
Heavyweight	Tyler East	def.	Amedio Viola	TKO (punches)	1	2:40
Light Heavyweight	William Albrecht	def.	Mike Messina	TKO (punches)	1	1:30

== Bellator 5 ==
Bellator 5
- Promotion: Bellator Fighting Championships
- Date: May 1, 2009
- Venue: Hara Arena
- City: Dayton, Ohio, United States

Event chronology
Bellator 4	Bellator 5	Bellator 6

Bellator 5 took place on Friday, May 1, 2009 in Dayton, Ohio. It was broadcast nationally in the U.S. via tape-delay the following night on Saturday, May 2, 2009 through an exclusive television agreement with ESPN Deportes.

Background

The event featured the semi-finals of the Lightweight Tournament.

Debuting for the promotion were heavyweight prospect Dave Herman and former UFC fighter Dan Evensen.

All bouts were contested under the Unified Rules of Mixed Martial Arts.

Results

Lightweight Semifinals
Weight class				Method	Round	Time	Notes
Lightweight	Toby Imada	def.	Jorge Masvidal	Technical Submission (inverted-triangle choke)	3	3:22
Lightweight	Eddie Alvarez	def.	Eric Reynolds	Submission (rear-naked choke)	3	1:30
Non-tournament bouts
Weight class				Method	Round	Time	Notes
Lightweight	Waylon Lowe	def.	Frank Caraballo	Decision (unanimous) (30-27, 30-27, 30-27)	3	5:00
Welterweight	Justin Edwards	def.	John Troyer	Submission (guillotine)	1	3:12
Female bout (117 lb)	Jessica Penne	def.	Tammie Schneider	TKO (punches)	1	1:35
Featherweight	Matt Jaggers	def.	Pete Dominguez	Submission (rear-naked choke)	1	4:03
Heavyweight	Dan Evensen	def.	Raoul Romero	TKO (punches)	2	1:44
Heavyweight	Joey Beltran	def.	Sherman Pendergarst	TKO (punches)	1	2:24
Heavyweight	Dave Herman	def.	Josh Barnes	TKO (punches)	1	4:46

== Bellator 6 ==
Bellator 6
- Promotion: Bellator Fighting Championships
- Date: May 8, 2009
- Venue: Central Pavilion Arena
- City: Robstown, Texas, United States

Event chronology
Bellator 5	Bellator 6	Bellator 7

Bellator 6 was an event of the mixed martial arts promotion, Bellator Fighting Championships. The event took place on Friday, May 8, 2009 in Robstown, Texas. It was broadcast nationally in the U.S. via tape-delay the following night on Saturday, May 9, 2009 through an exclusive television agreement with ESPN Deportes.

Background

The event featured the semi-finals of the Featherweight Tournament.

All bouts were contested under the Unified Rules of Mixed Martial Arts.

Results

Featherweight Semifinals
Weight class				Method	Round	Time	Notes
Featherweight	Joe Soto	def.	Wilson Reis	Decision (unanimous)	3	5:00
Featherweight	Yahir Reyes	def.	Estevan Payan	KO (spinning backfist)	2	1:56
Non-tournament bouts
Weight class				Method	Round	Time	Notes
Featherweight	Luis Palomino	def.	Nick Gonzalez	TKO (punches)	1	2:13
Featherweight	Roberto Vargas	def.	Daniel Pineda	Decision (unanimous)	3	5:00
Featherweight	Jose Santibanez	def.	Dustin Phillips	Submission (rear-naked choke)	1	3:34
Middleweight	Robert McDaniel	def.	Chris Spicer	Submission (rear-naked choke)	1	2:53
Catchweight (174 lb)	Héctor Urbina	def.	Ira Boyd	TKO (arm injury)	1	0:19

== Bellator 7/8 ==
Bellator 7/8
- Promotion: Bellator Fighting Championships
- Date: May 15, 2009
- Venue: Aragon Ballroom
- City: Chicago, Illinois, United States

Event chronology
Bellator 6	Bellator 7/8	Bellator 9

Bellator 7/8 was an event of the mixed martial arts promotion, Bellator Fighting Championships. The events took place on Friday, May 15, 2009 in Chicago, Illinois. It was broadcast nationally in the U.S. via tape-delay the following night on Saturday, May 16, 2009 through an exclusive television agreement with ESPN Deportes.

Background

The events featured the semi-finals of the Welterweight Tournament.

The card also featured the debut of former UFC heavyweight Eddie Sanchez.

All bouts were contested under the Unified Rules of Mixed Martial Arts.

Results

Welterweight Semifinals
Weight class				Method	Round	Time	Notes
Welterweight	Omar De La Cruz	def.	Dave Menne	TKO (punches)	1	3:19
Welterweight	Lyman Good	def.	Jorge Ortiz	TKO (cut)	2	4:37
Non-tournament bouts
Weight class				Method	Round	Time	Notes
Lightweight	Troy Gerhart	def.	Lorenzo Borgomeo	Decision (unanimous)	3	5:00
Heavyweight	Eddie Sanchez	def.	Jay White	TKO (punches)	1	0:10
Lightweight	Alonzo Martinez	def.	Victor Meza	Submission (rear-naked choke)	2	1:42
Welterweight	Jesse Juarez	def.	DeRay Davis	TKO (punches)	2	4:47
Welterweight	Anthony Lapsley	def.	Ryan Williams	Submission (rear-naked choke)	2	4:22
Welterweight	Jacob Volkmann	def.	Kevin Knabjian	Submission (D'arce choke)	2	1:42
Women's bout (135 lb)	Kerry Vera	def.	Leslie Smith	Decision (unanimous)	3	5:00

== Bellator 8 ==
There were no fights scheduled for week 8. Instead, Bellator ran a "Road to the Championship" special highlighting tournament fights. This highlight show was considered Bellator 8.

== Bellator 9 ==
Bellator 9
- Promotion: Bellator Fighting Championships
- Date: May 29, 2009
- Venue: Monroe Civic Center
- City: Monroe, Louisiana, United States

Event chronology
Bellator 7/8	Bellator 9	Bellator 10

Bellator 9 was a mixed martial arts event promoted by Bellator Fighting Championships. The event took place on Friday, May 29, 2009 in Monroe, Louisiana. It was broadcast nationally in the U.S. via tape-delay the following night on Saturday, May 30, 2009 through an exclusive television agreement with ESPN Deportes.

Results

Middleweight Semifinals
Weight class				Method	Round	Time	Notes
Middleweight	Hector Lombard	def.	Damien Stelly	TKO (punches)	1	2:56
Middleweight	Jared Hess	def.	Yosmany Cabezas	TKO (punches)	3	4:26
Non Tournament Bouts
Weight class				Method	Round	Time	Notes
Middleweight	Nick Ring	def.	Isidro Gonzalez	Submission (guillotine choke)	1	0:39
Featherweight	Shad Lierley	def.	Nathan Murdock	Decision (unanimous)	3	5:00
Middleweight	Alex Andrade	def.	Christian Fulgium	TKO (punches)	1	2:01
Heavyweight	Shawn Jordan	def.	Jayme McKinney	Submission (rear-naked choke)	1	0:30
Catchweight bout (175 lb)	Chad Leonhardt	def.	Dan Keenan	KO (knee)	1	3:03
Lightweight	Chas Skelly	def.	Mike Braswell	Decision (split)	3	5:00

== Bellator 10 ==
Bellator 10
- Promotion: Bellator Fighting Championships
- Date: June 5, 2009
- Venue: Citizens Business Bank Arena
- City: Ontario, California, United States

Event chronology
Bellator 9	Bellator 10	Bellator 11

Bellator 10 was a mixed martial arts event promoted by Bellator Fighting Championships. The event took place on Friday, June 5, 2009 in Ontario, California at the Citizens Business Bank Arena. It was broadcast nationally in the U.S. via tape-delay the following night on Saturday, June 6, 2009 through an exclusive television agreement with ESPN Deportes.

Background

The show featured the finals of the Featherweight tournament.

Results

Featherweight Final
Weight class				Method	Round	Time	Notes
Featherweight	Joe Soto	def.	Yahir Reyes	Submission (rear-naked choke)	2	4:11	(Note: Became first Bellator Featherweight Champion.)
Non-tournament bouts
Weight class				Method	Round	Time	Notes
Featherweight	Wilson Reis	def.	Roberto Vargas	Decision (split)	3	5:00
Middleweight	Bryan Baker	def.	Matt Horwich	Decision (unanimous)	3	5:00
Lightweight	Diego Garijo	def.	Saad Awad	Submission (rear-naked choke)	1	4:45
Lightweight	Israel Giron	def.	Phil Brown	Submission (rear-naked choke)	1	2:42
Heavyweight	Travis Browne	def.	Mychal Clark	Decision (unanimous)	3	5:00
Catchweight bout (175 lb)	Jesse Juarez	def.	Mikey Gomez	Decision (unanimous)	3	5:00
Light Heavyweight	Nick Moghaddam	def.	Lamar Jiles	Disqualification (illegal knee)	2	4:14

== Bellator 11 ==
Bellator 11
- Promotion: Bellator Fighting Championships
- Date: June 12, 2009
- Venue: Mohegan Sun Arena
- City: Uncasville, Connecticut, United States

Event chronology
Bellator 10	Bellator 11	Bellator 12

Bellator 11 was a mixed martial arts event promoted by Bellator Fighting Championships. The event took place on Friday, June 12, 2009 in Uncasville, Connecticut at the Mohegan Sun Arena. It broadcast nationally in the U.S. via tape-delay the following night on Saturday, June 13, 2009 through an exclusive television agreement with ESPN Deportes.

Background

This event featured the finals of the Bellator Welterweight Grand Prix.

Results

Welterweight Final
Weight class				Method	Round	Time	Notes
Welterweight	Lyman Good	def.	Omar De La Cruz	TKO (punches)	1	1:23	(Note: Became first Bellator Welterweight Champion.)
Non-tournament bouts
Weight class				Method	Round	Time	Notes
Welterweight	Vagner Rocha	def.	Igor Gracie	Decision (unanimous)	3	5:00
Welterweight	Jake Ellenberger	def.	Marcelo Alfaya	KO (punch)	1	0:42
Welterweight	Justin Torrey	def.	Matt Makowski	Decision (unanimous)	3	5:00
Bantamweight	Nick Pace	def.	Collin Tebo	KO (flying knee)	1	1:37
Middleweight	David Branch	def.	Dennis Olson	Submission (rear-naked choke)	1	2:27
Bantamweight	Jimmie Rivera	def.	Nick Garcia	Decision (unanimous)	3	5:00
Middleweight	Uriah Hall	def.	Edwin Aguilar	KO (head kicks)	3	4:31

== Bellator 12 ==
Bellator 12
- Promotion: Bellator Fighting Championships
- Date: June 19, 2009
- Venue: Seminole Hard Rock Hotel & Casino
- City: Hollywood, Florida, United States

Event chronology
Bellator 11	Bellator 12	Bellator 13

Bellator 12 was a mixed martial arts event by Bellator Fighting Championships. The event took place on Friday, June 19, 2009 at the Seminole Hard Rock Hotel & Casino in Hollywood, Florida. It was broadcast nationally in the U.S. via tape-delay the following night on Saturday, June 20, 2009 through an exclusive television agreement with ESPN Deportes.

Background

The event featured the final tournament bouts of the 2009 Season One Lightweight (155 lb) and Middleweight (185 lb) Tournaments, along with a number of non-tournament bouts held in the organization's other weight divisions.

All bouts were contested under the Unified Rules of Mixed Martial Arts.

Results

Lightweight Final
Weight class				Method	Round	Time	Notes
Lightweight	Eddie Alvarez	def.	Toby Imada	Submission (rear-naked choke)	2	0:38	(Note: Became first Bellator Lightweight Champion.)
Middleweight Final
Weight class				Method	Round	Time	Notes
Middleweight	Hector Lombard	def.	Jared Hess	TKO (doctor stoppage)	4	1:41	(Note: Became first Bellator Middleweight Champion.)
Non-tournament bouts
Weight class				Method	Round	Time	Notes
Lightweight	Jorge Masvidal	def.	Eric Reynolds	Submission (rear-naked choke)	3	3:33
Featherweight	Fabio Mello	def.	Sami Aziz	Submission (armbar)	3	1:58
Welterweight	Sérgio Moraes	def.	Josh Martin	Submission (triangle choke)	1	4:21
Women's bout (125 lb)	Rosi Sexton	def.	Valerie Coolbaugh	Submission (armbar)	1	3:40
Catchweight (151.5 lbs)	Luis Palomino	def.	Troy Gerhart	Decision (unanimous)	3	5:00
Women's bout (145 lb)	Stephanie Guimaraes	def.	Yvonne Reis	KO (knee)	1	0:49

== Tournaments ==
=== Middleweight Tournament Bracket ===
Quarterfinals
(Cuba)	Hector Lombard	KO
(Mexico)	Virgil Lozano	1
(United States)	Damien Stelly	UD
(United States)	Alex Andrade	3
(United States)	Jared Hess	SUB
(Spain)	Daniel Tabera	1
(United States)	Yosmany Cabezas	SUB
(Mexico)	Edwin Aguilar	1

Semifinals
(Cuba)	Hector Lombard	TKO
(United States)	Damien Stelly	1
(United States)	Jared Hess	TKO
(United States)	Yosmany Cabezas	3

Final
(Cuba)	Hector Lombard	TKO
(United States)	Jared Hess	4

=== Welterweight Tournament Bracket ===
Quarterfinals
(United States)	Lyman Good	SUB
(United States)	Héctor Urbina	2
(Mexico)	Jorge Ortiz	UD
(United States)	Aaron Romero	3
(Dominican Republic)	Omar De La Cruz	UD
(United States)	Victor Meza	3
(United States)	Dave Menne	SUB
(France)	Norman Paraisy	3

Semifinals
(United States)	Lyman Good	TKO
(Mexico)	Jorge Ortiz	2
(Dominican Republic)	Omar De La Cruz	TKO
(United States)	Dave Menne	1

Final
(United States)	Lyman Good	'TKO
(Dominican Republic)	Omar De La Cruz	1

=== Lightweight Tournament Bracket ===
Quarterfinals
(United States)	Eddie Alvarez	SUB
(United Kingdom)	Greg Loughran	1
(United States)	Eric Reynolds	TKO
(United States)	Thomas Schulte	1
(United States)	Toby Imada	SUB
(United States)	Alonzo Martinez	1
(United States)	Jorge Masvidal	TKO
(United States)	Nick Agallar	1

Semifinals
(United States)	Eddie Alvarez	SUB
(United States)	Eric Reynolds	3
(United States)	Toby Imada	SUB
(United States)	Jorge Masvidal	3

Final
(United States)	Eddie Alvarez	SUB
(United States)	Toby Imada	2

=== Featherweight Tournament Bracket ===
Quarterfinals
(United States)	Joe Soto	TKO
(Canada)	Ben Greer	1
(Brazil)	Wilson Reis	UD
(United States)	Henry Martinez	3
(Mexico)	Yahir Reyes	SUB
(United States)	Nick Gonzalez	1
(United States)	Estevan Payan	SD
(Peru)	Luis Palomino	3

Semifinals
(United States)	Joe Soto	UD
(Brazil)	Wilson Reis	3
(Mexico)	Yahir Reyes	KO
(United States)	Estevan Payan	2

Final
(United States)	Joe Soto	SUB
(Mexico)	Yahir Reyes	2
