= Jorge Ortiz (fighter) =

Mexican mixed martial artist

- Born: 1976 or 1977 (age 49–50); Chihuahua, Mexico
- Other names: The Naked Man
- Height: 6 ft 1 in (1.85 m)
- Weight: 170 lb (77 kg; 12 st)
- Division: Middleweight; Welterweight
- Fighting out of: Chihuahua, Mexico
- Team: Ragnarok MMA; Alliance MMA
- Years active: 2002–2004, 2006-2012, 2019

Mixed martial arts record
- Total: 30
- Wins: 19
- By knockout: 9
- By submission: 5
- By decision: 5
- Losses: 9
- By knockout: 2
- By submission: 1
- By decision: 6
- Draws: 1
- No contests: 1

Other information
- Mixed martial arts record from Sherdog

Jorge Ortiz is a retired Mexican professional mixed martial artist currently competing in the Welterweight division. A professional since 2002, he has competed for Strikeforce, Shooto, Bellator, and King of the Cage.

== Strikeforce ==
At Strikeforce: Shamrock vs. Gracie, Ortiz lost to Eugene Jackson by unanimous decision.

== Bellator ==
At Bellator II, Ortiz defeated Aaron Romero by unanimous decision. This bout was a quarterfinal of the Bellator Season One Welterweight Tournament.

At Bellator VII, Ortiz was defeated by Lyman Good by stoppage. This bout was a semifinal of the Bellator Season One Welterweight Tournament.

== Mixed martial arts record ==
Professional record breakdown
| 30 matches | 19 wins | 9 losses |
| By knockout | 9 | 2 |
| By submission | 5 | 1 |
| By decision | 5 | 6 |
| Draws | 1 | |
| No contests | 1 | |

| Res. | Record | Opponent | Method | Event | Date | Round | Time | Location | Notes |
|---|---|---|---|---|---|---|---|---|---|
| Win | 19–9–1 (1) | Ant'wan Williams | TKO (punches) | Imperio MMA: Rocky Point Beach Bash | July 20, 2019 | 2 | 3:30 | Puerto Peñasco, Mexico | |
| Win | 18–9–1 (1) | Alejandro Baez | Decision (unanimous) | The Supreme Cage 1 | March 10, 2012 | 3 | 5:00 | Monterrey, Nuevo León, Mexico | |
| Loss | 17–9–1 (1) | Julio Cesar Cruz | Decision (unanimous) | Grand Prix FMP 2011 | June 30, 2011 | 3 | 5:00 | Chihuahua, Mexico | |
| Win | 17–8–1 (1) | Alejandro Baez | Submission (triangle choke) | Combate Extremo: Greco vs. Ortiz | May 21, 2011 | 1 | 2:20 | Monterrey, Nuevo León, Mexico | |
| Loss | 16–8–1 (1) | Willie Parks | Decision (split) | BloodSport Championships: Time to Bleed | March 25, 2011 | 3 | 5:00 | El Paso, Texas, United States | |
| Loss | 16–7–1 (1) | Terry Martin | Decision (split) | PWP: War on the Mainland | August 14, 2010 | 3 | 5:00 | Irvine, California, United States | |
| Loss | 16–6–1 (1) | Nate James | Decision (split) | C3 Fights: Knockout-Rockout Weekend 3 | June 19, 2010 | 3 | 3:00 | Concho, Oklahoma, United States | |
| Loss | 16–5–1 (1) | Lyman Good | TKO (doctor stoppage) | Bellator 7 | May 15, 2009 | 2 | 4:37 | Chicago, Illinois, United States | Bellator Season One Welterweight Tournament Semifinal. |
| Win | 16–4–1 (1) | Aaron Romero | Decision (unanimous) | Bellator 2 | April 10, 2009 | 3 | 5:00 | Uncasville, Connecticut, United States | Welterweight debut; Bellator Season One Welterweight Tournament Quarterfinal. |
| Win | 15–4–1 (1) | Ulysses Cortez | Decision (unanimous) | COF 13: Aztec Alliance | August 16, 2008 | 3 | 5:00 | Tijuana, Baja California, Mexico | |
| Loss | 14–4–1 (1) | Jesse Taylor | TKO (punches) | Total Combat 21 | June 8, 2007 | 2 | 1:09 | San Diego, California, United States | |
| Win | 14–3–1 (1) | John Cronk | TKO (punches) | No Limits: Proving Ground | April 21, 2007 | 1 | 1:43 | Irvine, California, United States | |
| Win | 13–3–1 (1) | Brady Fink | Decision (unanimous) | Total Combat 19 | March 31, 2007 | 3 | 5:00 | Yuma, Arizona, United States | |
| Win | 12–3–1 (1) | John Cronk | TKO (doctor stoppage) | Cage Fighting Federation | November 10, 2006 | 1 | N/A | Albuquerque, New Mexico, United States | |
| Win | 11–3–1 (1) | Prince McLean | TKO (corner stoppage) | MMA Mexico | October 27, 2006 | 1 | 5:00 | Monterrey, Nuevo León, Mexico | |
| Win | 10–3–1 (1) | Francisco Ayon | Submission (triangle choke) | MMA Mexico | May 26, 2006 | 2 | 2:31 | Mexico | |
| Win | 9–3–1 (1) | Enrique Luna | Submission (strikes) | MMA Mexico | May 26, 2006 | N/A | N/A | Mexico | |
| Loss | 8–3–1 (1) | Eugene Jackson | Decision (unanimous) | Strikeforce: Shamrock vs. Gracie | March 10, 2006 | 3 | 5:00 | San Jose, California, United States | |
| Draw | 8–2–1 (1) | Paul Kisor | Majority draw | Shooto: Proving Ground | February 3, 2006 | 2 | 5:00 | St. Louis, Missouri, United States | |
| Loss | 8–2 (1) | Jon Fitch | Decision (unanimous) | MMA Mexico: Day 1 | December 17, 2004 | 3 | 5:00 | Ciudad Juárez, Chihuahua, Mexico | |
| Win | 8–1 (1) | Jason Guida | Decision (unanimous) | MMA Mexico: Day 1 | December 17, 2004 | 3 | 5:00 | Ciudad Juárez, Chihuahua, Mexico | Catchweight (190 lbs) bout. |
| Loss | 7–1 (1) | Joey Villaseñor | Submission (strikes) | KOTC: Hostile Takeover | December 4, 2004 | 1 | 3:19 | Acoma, New Mexico, United States | For the KOTC Middleweight Championship. |
| Win | 7–0 (1) | Chee Bates | TKO (punches) | Independent Event | November 13, 2004 | 1 | 0:40 | Bernalillo, New Mexico, United States | |
| Win | 6–0 (1) | Al Delgado | KO (punches) | KOTC: New Mexico | August 28, 2004 | 1 | 1:00 | Albuquerque, New Mexico, United States | |
| NC | 5–0 (1) | Jason Guida | No contest | Ultimate Fighting Mexico | November 15, 2003 | 1 | N/A | Monterrey, Nuevo León, Mexico | |
| Win | 5–0 | Brett Shafer | TKO (punches) | Cage Fighting Monterrey | January 30, 2003 | N/A | N/A | Monterrey, Nuevo León, Mexico | |
| Win | 4–0 | Wes Lindsay | Submission (punches) | Ultimate Fighting Mexico | October 26, 2002 | 2 | N/A | Monterrey, Nuevo León, Mexico | |
| Win | 3–0 | Tim Green | TKO (punches) | Aztec Challenge 1 | September 6, 2002 | 1 | N/A | Ciudad Juárez, Chihuahua, Mexico | |
| Win | 2–0 | Edward Kim | TKO (punches) | MMA: Cuando Hierve la Sangre | August 31, 2002 | 1 | N/A | Monterrey, Nuevo León, Mexico | |
| Win | 1–0 | Filameno Fackrell | Submission (rear-naked choke) | Combate Libre Mexico 2 | April 26, 2002 | N/A | N/A | Mexico | |
