= Lyman Good =

American mixed martial arts fighter

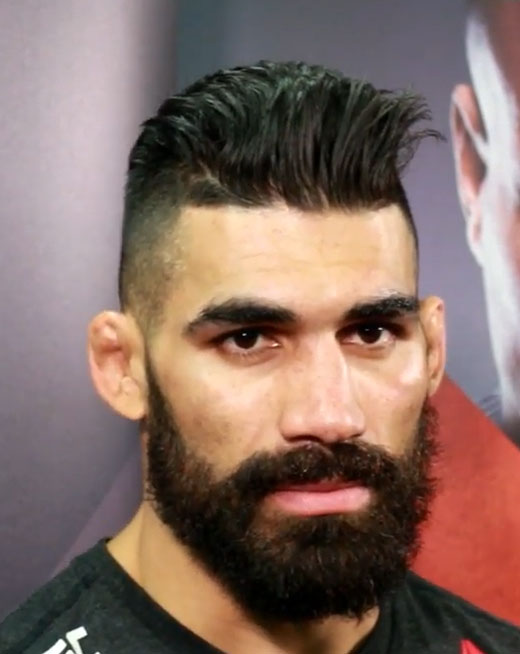
- Lyman Good at UFC 230.
- Born: Lyman Merrill Good; May 26, 1985 (age 41); Harlem, New York, United States
- Other names: Cyborg
- Nationality: American
- Height: 6 ft 0 in (1.83 m)
- Weight: 170 lb (77 kg; 12 st)
- Division: Welterweight (2009-present); Middleweight (2005-2008)
- Reach: 74 in (188 cm)
- Stance: Orthodox
- Fighting out of: Manhattan, New York
- Team: Team Tiger Schulmann
- Rank: 3rd degree black belt in Tiger Schulmann's MMA under Daniel "Tiger" Schulmann
- Years active: 2005–2020

Mixed martial arts record
- Total: 28
- Wins: 21
- By knockout: 11
- By submission: 3
- By decision: 7
- Losses: 6
- By submission: 1
- By decision: 5
- No contests: 1

Other information
- Website: tapology.com
- Mixed martial arts record from Sherdog

Lyman Merrill Good (born May 26, 1985), also known as "American Cyborg", is an American mixed martial artist. He is perhaps best known for his time spent with Bellator, where he was the inaugural Bellator Welterweight Champion, along with being the first Welterweight Tournament Champion, and for competing in the welterweight division of the Ultimate Fighting Championship.

== Biography ==
Good was born and raised in the Spanish Harlem section of New York, raised along with his two sisters by only his mother. After a troublesome childhood, Lyman's mother felt getting her son involved in martial arts would be a good way for him to release his anger.

Outside of fighting, Lyman is also a Sensei/instructor for Tiger Schulmann mixed martial arts in Manhattan, NY.

== Mixed martial arts career ==
=== Early career ===
Lyman began his fighting career in 2005, at the Ring of Combat promotion. In his second fight, against John Zecchino, he fractured his hand in the beginning of the match. Despite that fact, he won the match by TKO in the second round. Lyman continued to fight in the Ring of Combat promotion, as well as in the IFL and other minor promotions.

In the IFL 2007 semi-finals he was matched against TUF 7 participant Mike Dolce in one of the preliminary bouts. Good controlled the fight on the ground in the second round, gained an edge in the stand-up in the third, and won via unanimous decision.

In his last appearance at the Ring of Combat promotion, at ROC XVII, he fought Alexis Aquino. Good dominated the first round with his striking, and while Aquino took control in the second round, Lyman recovered his dominance in the third, winning via unanimous 29-28 decision on the three scoreboards. ROC XVII, including the Good vs. Aquino match, was televised live by HDNet Fights.

In addition to MMA bouts, Good participated in three kickboxing matches in Chuck Norris's World Combat League, winning all three.

=== Bellator Fighting Championships ===
Prior to signing a deal with Bellator, Lyman was to sign with EliteXC, before the promotion folded. His first fight with EliteXC was scheduled to be against Paul Daley. Two weeks before his first bout in the Bellator welterweight tournament, he has been featured on ESPN, doing a segment for the ESPN Rise program. As part of the preparation to the tournament, Lyman spent several weeks sleeping in a MMA cage at the Tiger Schulmann headquarters facility in Elmwood Park, NJ, in order to prepare mentally for the fight.

His first fight in tournament fight took place at Bellator II, against Héctor Urbina, Good dominated the first round with his powerful strikes and in the second round Urbina was able to gain mount momentarily, but Good quickly reversed and defeated Urbina using a rear naked choke. In the tournament's semi-finals at Bellator VII, he defeated Jorge Ortiz and advanced to the finals. His opponent in the tournament's finals, Omar De La Cruz, defeated Dave Menne in the same event.

The finals of the Bellator Fighting Championships welterweight tournament took place at Bellator XI. Lyman scored a takedown early in the first round, trapped De La Cruz against the cage, and pounded his way to a TKO victory. After the fight, Lyman was crowned the first Bellator Welterweight Champion. In his first title defense on October 21, 2010 Good fought rising star Ben Askren, Askren was able to take him down and control him despite being hit with a huge upkick and almost being caught in a triangle choke at the last minute of the fight. Good went on to lose a Unanimous Decision losing his Bellator Welterweight Title.

On March 5, 2011, Good debuted in Bellator's fourth season welterweight tournament quarterfinals against prospect Chris Lozano, He won the fight via unanimous decision.

On April 2, 2011, In the Semifinals, Good faced Judo specialist Rick Hawn at Bellator 39, losing a controversial split decision and exiting the tournament.

Good was scheduled to fight Dan Hornbuckle at Bellator 44 in a bout that was to serve as a qualifier to gain entry into the promotion's Season Five Welterweight tournament, but Good suffered a hamstring injury that forced him out of the fight.

On April 13, 2012, Good faced LeVon Maynard in a qualifying bout at Bellator 65 for Season Seven's Welterweight tournament winning via KO in just 13 seconds of round one.

On September 28, 2012, Good faced UK fighter Jim Wallhead at Bellator 74 in a Quarterfinal bout of Season Seven winning via unanimous decision.

On October 26, 2012, Good faced Michail Tsarev at Bellator 78 in the Semifinals winning via TKO due to punches in the second round.

On November 30, 2012, Good faced Andrey Koreshkov at Bellator 82 in the Finals of Bellator's Season Seven Welterweight tournament losing via unanimous decision.

On April 4, 2013, Good faced Dante Rivera at Bellator 95, winning via unanimous decision.

=== The Ultimate Fighter ===
In March 2014, it was revealed that Good would be a participant on the UFC's The Ultimate Fighter: Team Edgar vs. Team Penn. He lost his fight to get into the house.

=== Cage Fury Fighting Championships ===
Good faced Matt Secor at CFFC 36: Secor vs. Good on June 21, 2014. Good defeated Secor via KO in the first round.

Good faced Jonavin Webb at CFFC 43: Webb vs. Good on November 1, 2014. The fight ended in a no contest due to an accidental eye poke.

=== Ultimate Fighting Championship ===
Good made his promotional debut as a short notice replacement against Andrew Craig on July 15, 2015 at UFC Fight Night 71, filling in for an injured Edgar Garcia. He won the fight by TKO in the second round.

Good was expected to face Omari Akhmedov on December 10, 2015 at UFC Fight Night 80. However, Good was pulled from the bout in late October and was replaced by Sérgio Moraes.

Good was expected to face Belal Muhammad on November 12, 2016 at UFC 205. However, on October 24, Good was pulled from the card after being notified by USADA due to a potential anti-doping violation stemming from an out-of-competition sample collected ten days earlier. He was replaced by Vicente Luque. Subsequently, USADA released a statement that Good ingested the drug 1-androstenedione as part of a tainted product and Good was given a six-month ban retroactive to the date of his initial suspension in October 2016.

After over two years away from the sport, Good returned to face Elizeu Zaleski dos Santos on July 22, 2017 at UFC on Fox 25. He lost the back-and-forth fight by split decision. The fight earned Good his first Fight of the Night bonus award.

Good was expected to face Sultan Aliev on November 3, 2018 at UFC 230. However, it was reported on October 19, 2018 that Aliev pulled out from the event citing injury and he was replaced by Ben Saunders. He won the fight via knockout in round one.

Good faced Demian Maia on February 2, 2019 at UFC Fight Night 144. He lost the fight via standing rear-naked choke submission in the first round, the first time he had been stopped in his MMA career.

Good faced Chance Rencountre on November 2, 2019 at UFC 244. He won the fight via TKO in the third round.

Good was expected to face Belal Muhammad on April 18, 2020 at UFC 249. However on April 4, Good pulled out due to COVID-19 infection. The bout was rebooked and eventually took place on June 20, 2020 at UFC on ESPN 11. He lost the fight via unanimous decision.

On September 17, 2026, it was reported that Good was removed from the UFC roster.

== Championships and accomplishments ==
- Ultimate Fighting Championship
  - Fight of the Night (One time) vs. Elizeu Zaleski dos Santos
- Bellator Fighting Championships
  - Bellator Welterweight Championship (One time, First)
  - Bellator Season 1 Welterweight Tournament Winner
  - Bellator Season 7 Welterweight Tournament Runner-Up
- Cage Fury Fighting Championships
  - CFFC Welterweight Championship (One time)
  - Interim CFFC Welterweight Championship (One time)

== Suing supplement companies for tainted products ==
Good was pulled from his initial UFC debut on November 12, 2016 at UFC 205 from a USADA violation stemming from an out-of-competition sample collected ten days earlier whereby Good ingested 1-androstenedione and was given a six-month ban. Good filed two complaints suing Gaspari Nutrition, Hi-Tech Pharmaceutials, Vitamin Shoppe and Millennium Sport Technologies for breach of express warranty (sales contract), false advertising, deceptive practices and assault.

== Mixed martial arts record ==
Professional record breakdown
28 matches	21 wins	6 losses
By knockout	11	0
By submission	3	1
By decision	7	5
No contests	1	

Res.	Record	Opponent	Method	Event	Date	Round	Time	Location	Notes
Loss	21–6 (1)	Belal Muhammad	Decision (unanimous)	UFC on ESPN: Blaydes vs. Volkov	June 20, 2020	3	5:00	Las Vegas, Nevada, United States	
Win	21–5 (1)	Chance Rencountre	TKO (punches)	UFC 244	November 2, 2019	3	2:03	New York City, New York, United States	
Loss	20–5 (1)	Demian Maia	Submission (rear-naked choke)	UFC Fight Night: Assunção vs. Moraes 2	February 2, 2019	1	2:38	Fortaleza, Brazil	
Win	20–4 (1)	Ben Saunders	KO (punches)	UFC 230	November 3, 2018	1	1:32	New York City, New York, United States	
Loss	19–4 (1)	Elizeu Zaleski dos Santos	Decision (split)	UFC on Fox: Weidman vs. Gastelum	July 22, 2017	3	5:00	Uniondale, New York, United States	Fight of the Night.
Win	19–3 (1)	Andrew Craig	KO (punches)	UFC Fight Night: Mir vs. Duffee	July 15, 2015	2	3:37	San Diego, California, United States	
Win	18–3 (1)	Nah-Shon Burrell	Submission (rear-naked choke)	CFFC 48: Good vs. Burrell	May 9, 2015	1	3:47	Atlantic City, New Jersey, United States	Won and unified the CFFC Welterweight Championship.
Win	17–3 (1)	Micah Terrill	Submission (rear-naked choke)	CFFC 45: Stiner vs. Horcher	February 7, 2015	1	3:47	Atlantic City, New Jersey, United States	Won the interim CFFC Welterweight Championship.
NC	16–3 (1)	Jonavin Webb	NC (accidental eye poke)	CFFC 43: Webb vs. Good	November 1, 2014	3	3:43	Atlantic City, New Jersey, United States	
Win	16–3	Matt Secor	KO (punches)	CFFC 36: Secor vs. Good	June 21, 2014	1	4:21	Morristown, New Jersey, United States	
Win	15–3	Dante Rivera	Decision (unanimous)	Bellator 95	April 4, 2013	3	5:00	Atlantic City, New Jersey, United States	
Loss	14–3	Andrey Koreshkov	Decision (unanimous)	Bellator 82	November 30, 2012	3	5:00	Mt. Pleasant, Michigan, United States	Bellator Season 7 Welterweight Tournament Final.
Win	14–2	Michail Tsarev	TKO (punches)	Bellator 78	October 26, 2012	2	3:54	Dayton, Ohio, United States	Bellator Season 7 Welterweight Tournament Semifinal.
Win	13–2	Jim Wallhead	Decision (unanimous)	Bellator 74	September 28, 2012	3	5:00	Atlantic City, New Jersey, United States	Bellator Season 7 Welterweight Tournament Quarterfinal.
Win	12–2	LeVon Maynard	KO (punch)	Bellator 65	April 13, 2012	1	0:13	Atlantic City, New Jersey, United States	Bellator Season 7 Welterweight Tournament Qualifier.
Loss	11–2	Rick Hawn	Decision (split)	Bellator 39	April 2, 2011	3	5:00	Uncasville, Connecticut, United States	Bellator Season 4 Welterweight Tournament Semifinal.
Win	11–1	Chris Lozano	Decision (unanimous)	Bellator 35	March 5, 2011	3	5:00	Lemoore, California, United States	Bellator Season 4 Welterweight Tournament Quarterfinal.
Loss	10–1	Ben Askren	Decision (unanimous)	Bellator 33	October 21, 2010	5	5:00	Philadelphia, Pennsylvania, United States	Lost the Bellator Welterweight World Championship.
Win	10–0	Omar de la Cruz	TKO (punches)	Bellator 11	June 12, 2009	1	1:47	Uncasville, Connecticut, United States	Won the inaugural Bellator Welterweight World Championship. Season 1 Welterweight Tournament Final.
Win	9–0	Jorge Ortiz	TKO (doctor stoppage)	Bellator 7	May 15, 2009	2	4:37	Chicago, Illinois, United States	Bellator Season 1 Welterweight Tournament Semifinal.
Win	8–0	Héctor Urbina	Technical Submission (rear-naked choke)	Bellator 2	April 10, 2009	2	3:22	Uncasville, Connecticut, United States	Welterweight debut. Bellator Season 1 Welterweight Tournament Quarterfinal.
Win	7–0	Alexis Aquino	Decision (unanimous)	Ring of Combat 18	March 7, 2008	3	5:00	Atlantic City, New Jersey, United States	
Win	6–0	Mike Dolce	Decision (unanimous)	IFL: 2007 Semi-Finals	August 2, 2007	3	4:00	East Rutherford, New Jersey, United States	Catchweight (180 lbs) bout.
Win	5–0	Doug Gordon	Decision (unanimous)	Cage Fury Fighting Championships 5	June 23, 2007	3	3:00	Atlantic City, New Jersey, United States	
Win	4–0	Erik Charles	TKO (doctor stoppage)	Ring of Combat 14	April 27, 2007	1	5:00	Atlantic City, New Jersey, United States	
Win	3–0	Julio Cruz	TKO (punches)	World's Best Fighter: USA vs. Asia	February 3, 2007	2	0:29	Atlantic City, New Jersey, United States	Middleweight debut.
Win	2–0	John Zecchino	TKO (punches)	Ring of Combat 10	April 16, 2006	2	3:37	Atlantic City, New Jersey, United States	Catchweight (173 lbs) bout.
Win	1–0	Adam Fearon	Decision (unanimous)	Ring of Combat 9	October 29, 2005	3	5:00	Asbury Park, New Jersey, United States	Catchweight (178 lbs) bout.

== See also ==
- List of Bellator MMA alumni
- List of male mixed martial artists

New championship	1st Bellator Welterweight Championship; June 12, 2009 - October 21, 2010	Succeeded by Ben Askren
