= Yahir Reyes =

Mexican mixed martial artist

- Born: August 14, 1985 (age 41); Tijuana, Mexico
- Height: 5 ft 7 in (1.70 m)
- Weight: 144.5 lb (65.5 kg; 10.32 st)
- Division: Featherweight
- Fighting out of: Tijuana, Mexico
- Team: Team Reyes
- Years active: 2002-2010

Mixed martial arts record
- Total: 22
- Wins: 14
- By knockout: 4
- By submission: 8
- By decision: 2
- Losses: 7
- By knockout: 3
- By submission: 3
- By decision: 1
- No contests: 1

Other information
- Mixed martial arts record from Sherdog

Yahir Reyes (born August 14, 1985) is a Mexican former professional mixed martial artist. A professional competitor from 2002 until 2010, he competed for Bellator.

== Mixed martial arts record ==
Professional record breakdown
22 matches	14 wins	7 losses
By knockout	4	3
By submission	8	3
By decision	2	1
Draws	0	
No contests	1	

Res.	Record	Opponent	Method	Event	Date	Round	Time	Location	Notes
Loss	14-7	Richard Schiller	Submission (rear naked choke)	MEZ Sports: Pandemonium 2	September 11, 2010	3	1:27	Los Angeles, California, United States	
Loss	14-6	Joe Soto	Submission (rear naked choke)	Bellator 10	June 5, 2009	2	4:11	Ontario, California, United States	Bellator Season One Featherweight Tournament Final; For Bellator Featherweight Championship.
Win	14-5	Estevan Payan	KO (spinning back fist)	Bellator 6	May 8, 2009	2	1:56	Robstown, Texas, United States	Bellator Season One Featherweight Tournament Semifinal.
Win	13-5	Nick Gonzalez	Submission (rear-naked choke)	Bellator 1	April 3, 2009	1	2:11	Hollywood, Florida, United States	Bellator Season One Featherweight Tournament Quarterfinal.
Win	12-5	Paris Ruiz	KO (punches)	COF 13: Aztec Alliance	August 16, 2008	2	4:22	Tijuana, Mexico	
Win	11-5	Fred Leavy	Decision (split)	MMA Xtreme 18	January 26, 2008	3	5:00	Tijuana, Mexico	
Win	10-5	Zus Gutierrez	Submission (rear naked choke)	MMA Xtreme 17	December 15, 2007	1	2:03	Honduras	
Win	9-5	Charles Williams	Submission (triangle choke)	MMA Xtreme 15	November 16, 2007	1	3:00	Mexico City, Mexico	
Loss	8-5	Jose Luis Cocafuego	Submission (heel hook)	MMA Xtreme 12	June 30, 2007	1	1:22	Mexicali, Mexico	
Win	8-4	Art Diaz	Submission (armbar)	MMA Xtreme 11	April 27, 2007	1	0:51	Tijuana, Mexico	
Win	7-4	Robbie Peralta	Submission (rear naked choke)	MMA Xtreme 9	March 3, 2007	1	N/A	Tijuana, Mexico	
Win	6-4	Benjamin la Cobra	Submission (armbar)	MMA Xtreme 8	February 3, 2007	2	N/A	Santo Domingo, Dominican Republic	
Win	5-4	Rick Screeton	Submission (armbar)	MMA Xtreme 7	November 11, 2006	2	0:13	Tijuana, Mexico	
Win	4-4	John Wallace	KO (punches)	MMA Xtreme 6	October 26, 2006	2	1:01	Tijuana, Mexico	
Loss	3-4	Landon Piercey	TKO (corner stoppage)	MMA Xtreme 3	June 3, 2006	2	5:00	Tijuana, Mexico	
Win	3-3	Issac Peralta	TKO	MMA Xtreme 1	March 25, 2006	1	N/A	Tijuana, Mexico	
Loss	2-3	Angelo Catsouras	TKO (corner stoppage)	Total Combat 12	December 17, 2005	1	5:00	Tijuana, Mexico	
NC	2-2	Rick Screeton	No Contest	Total Combat 9	July 30, 2005	N/A	N/A	Tijuana, Mexico	
Loss	2-2	Chris David	TKO (punches)	Total Combat 4	July 25, 2004	1	N/A	Tijuana, Mexico	
Win	2-1	Michael Chupa	Decision (unanimous)	Total Combat 2	February 29, 2004	3	3:00	Tijuana, Mexico	
Win	1-1	Angel Yocupicio	Submission (armbar)	Reto Maximo 2	December 8, 2002	2	3:19	Tijuana, Mexico	
Loss	0-1	Ivan Lopez	Decision (unanimous)	Reto Maximo 1	September 8, 2002	2	5:00	Tijuana, Mexico	
