= Eric Reynolds (fighter) =

American mixed martial arts (MMA) fighter

- Born: May 11, 1983 (age 43); Bradenton, Florida, United States
- Other names: It's a Wrap
- Height: 5 ft 11 in (1.80 m)
- Weight: 155 lb (70 kg; 11.1 st)
- Division: Lightweight
- Reach: 72.0 in (183 cm)
- Fighting out of: Sarasota, Florida, United States
- Team: The Dungeon MMA; American Top Team
- Years active: 2007-2015; 2017-2018

Mixed martial arts record
- Total: 28
- Wins: 18
- By knockout: 8
- By submission: 8
- By decision: 2
- Losses: 10
- By knockout: 2
- By submission: 4
- By decision: 3
- By disqualification: 1
- Draws: 0

Other information
- Mixed martial arts record from Sherdog

Eric Reynolds (born May 11, 1983 in Bradenton, Florida) is an American professional mixed martial artist who last competed in 2018. A professional since 2007, he has fought in Bellator, the World Series of Fighting, and Absolute Championship Berkut.

== Mixed martial arts career ==
Reynolds made his debut for Bellator Fighting Championships, competing in their lightweight division tournament. Eric had his first fight in the tournament against Thomas Schulte. Reynolds ended up defeating Thomas via TKO at the end of the first round. Reynolds's second fight in the tournament was against number three lightweight fighter, Eddie Alvarez, the bout was at Bellator 5. In the start of the third round, Reynolds gave up his back and was submitted by rear naked choke.

Reynolds fought Jorge Masvidal at Bellator 12, both fighters agreed to a catchweight bout of 160 lbs. Reynolds lost after a third round rear naked choke submission.

He fought Greg Loughran at the event Art of Fighting: Sauer vs. Cruz and won via TKO in the first round.

On October 17, he fought one of Peru's top unsigned fighters, Ivan Iberico at Night of Battle 1. The fight was back and forth with Reynolds showing great submission defense after being put into numerous submission holds. The fight end with Eric knocking out Iberico with a down kick that the referee as well as the crowd thought was an illegal stomp. The crowd was not pleased by Reynold's move and began booing and throwing items into the cage.

Eric was in talks with the Japan based promotion, DREAM. However, for unknown reasons a contract never materialized. He then moved out to Coconut Creek, Florida to train full-time with the American Top Team. He also defeated IFL vet, Travis Cox, at Art of Fighting 8 in May. On December 4, 2010, Reynolds was scheduled to fight Korean fighter, Seung Hwan Bang, but Bang was forced out of the bout. He was replaced by UFC veteran Rob Emerson. Reynolds lost the fight by split decision in a fight that most thought Reynolds won.

Eric most recently has seen success in XFC cage accumulating 3 straight wins. Since signing his XFC contract Eric has faced top opponents like Brazilian jiu-jitsu Black Belt Jonatas Novaes, American Top Team striking coach Luciano Dos Santos and Blackzilian team member Lorenzo Borgomeo. Eric fought Nick Newell for the vacant XFC lightweight championship belt on December 7, 2012 in Nashville, TN. He was submitted in the first round via rear naked choke.

== Championships and accomplishments ==
- Cage MMA
  - Cage Lightweight Championship (One time)

== Mixed martial arts record ==
Professional record breakdown
28 matches	18 wins	10 losses
By knockout	8	2
By submission	8	4
By decision	2	3
By disqualification	0	1

Res.	Record	Opponent	Method	Event	Date	Round	Time	Location	Notes
Loss	18–10	Anton Kuivanen	Decision (unanimous)	Cage 31	September 19, 2015	3	5:00	Helsinki, Finland	Lost the Cage Lightweight Championship.
Loss	18–9	Jorge Patino	Decision (unanimous)	WSOF 15	November 15, 2014	3	5:00	Tampa, Florida, United States	
Loss	18–8	Musa Khamanaev	KO (punch)	ACB 10: Coliseum Time	October 4, 2014	1	3:54	Grozny, Russia	
Loss	18–7	Dom O'Grady	Submission (rear-naked choke)	XFC 27: Frozen Fury	December 13, 2013	2	1:42	Muskegon, Michigan, United States	
Win	18–6	Anton Kuivanen	KO (punches)	Cage 23	September 21, 2013	1	0:30	Vantaa, Finland	Won the Cage Lightweight Championship.
Win	17–6	Kevin Forant	Submission (arm-triangle choke)	XFC 24: Collision Course	June 14, 2013	1	4:13	Tampa, Florida, United States	
Loss	16–6	Nick Newell	Submission (rear-naked choke)	XFC 21: Night of Champions II	December 7, 2012	1	1:22	Nashville, Tennessee, United States	For the XFC Lightweight Championship.
Win	16–5	Lorenzo Borgomeo	Submission (guillotine choke)	XFC 20: High Octane	September 28, 2012	2	3:58	Knoxville, Tennessee, United States	Catchweight (160 lbs) bout.
Win	15–5	Luciano dos Santos	Decision (unanimous)	XFC 17: Apocalypse	April 13, 2012	3	5:00	Jackson, Tennessee, United States	
Win	14–5	Jonatas Novaes	Decision (unanimous)	XFC 15: Tribute	December 2, 2011	3	5:00	Tampa, Florida, United States	
Loss	13–5	Rob Emerson	Decision (split)	Art of Fighting 10: Blackout	December 4, 2010	3	5:00	Estero, Florida, United States	
Win	13–4	Travis Cox	Submission (guillotine choke)	Art of Fighting 8: Fury	May 22, 2010	2	1:45	Estero, Florida, United States	
Loss	12–4	Ivan Iberico	DQ (illegal axe kick)	NDC 1: Peru vs. American Top Team	October 17, 2009	2	4:58	San Borja District, Peru	
Win	12–3	Greg Loughran	TKO (punches)	Art of Fighting: Sauer vs. Cruz	August 22, 2009	1	1:54	Tampa, Florida, United States	
Loss	11–3	Jorge Masvidal	Submission (rear-naked choke)	Bellator 12	June 19, 2009	3	3:33	Hollywood, Florida, United States	Catchweight (160 lbs) bout.
Loss	11–2	Eddie Alvarez	Submission (rear-naked choke)	Bellator 5	May 1, 2009	3	1:30	Dayton, Ohio, United States	Bellator Lightweight Semifinal Tournament bout.
Win	11–1	Thomas Schulte	KO (head kick and punches)	Bellator 2	April 10, 2009	1	4:17	Uncasville, Connecticut, United States	Bellator Lightweight Quarterfinal Tournament bout.
Win	10–1	Jose Figueroa	Submission (guillotine choke)	Revolution Fight Club 3	February 20, 2009	1	1:19	Miami, Florida, United States	
Loss	9–1	Luis Palomino	KO (punch)	G-Force Fights: Bad Blood	November 6, 2008	1	0:38	Miami, Florida, United States	
Win	9–0	Damian Vitale	KO (punch)	WFC 7: Lock Down	June 30, 2008	1	1:00	Atlantic City, New Jersey, United States	
Win	8–0	York Ash	Submission (rear-naked choke)	WFC 6: Battle in the Bay	March 22, 2008	1	3:07	Tampa, Florida, United States	
Win	7–0	Brent Rose	TKO (punches)	Miami Vale Tudo	January 26, 2008	1	1:45	Miami, Florida, United States	
Win	6–0	Schon Ellis	Submission (rear-naked choke)	Ultimate Gladiator Championship	December 14, 2007	1	1:20	Miami, Florida, United States	
Win	5–0	Carlos Gonzalez	Submission (guillotine choke)	Rage in the Cage 101	October 6, 2007	1	3:34	Fort Lauderdale, Florida, United States	
Win	4–0	Adron Morrison	TKO (punches)	WFC 4: Cage Wars	July 13, 2007	1	0:37	Tallahassee, Florida, United States	
Win	3–0	John Tribby	Submission (rear-naked choke)	WFC 3: Turf Wars III	April 7, 2007	1	0:22	Tampa, Florida, United States	
Win	2–0	Daniel Costell	KO (punches)	WFC 2: Turf Wars II	February 9, 2007	1	1:13	Tampa, Florida, United States	
Win	1–0	Shane Ouimette	TKO (punches)	WFC 1: Turf Wars I	January 4, 2007	1	2:40	Tampa, Florida, United States	
