= Wilson Reis =

Brazilian mixed martial artist

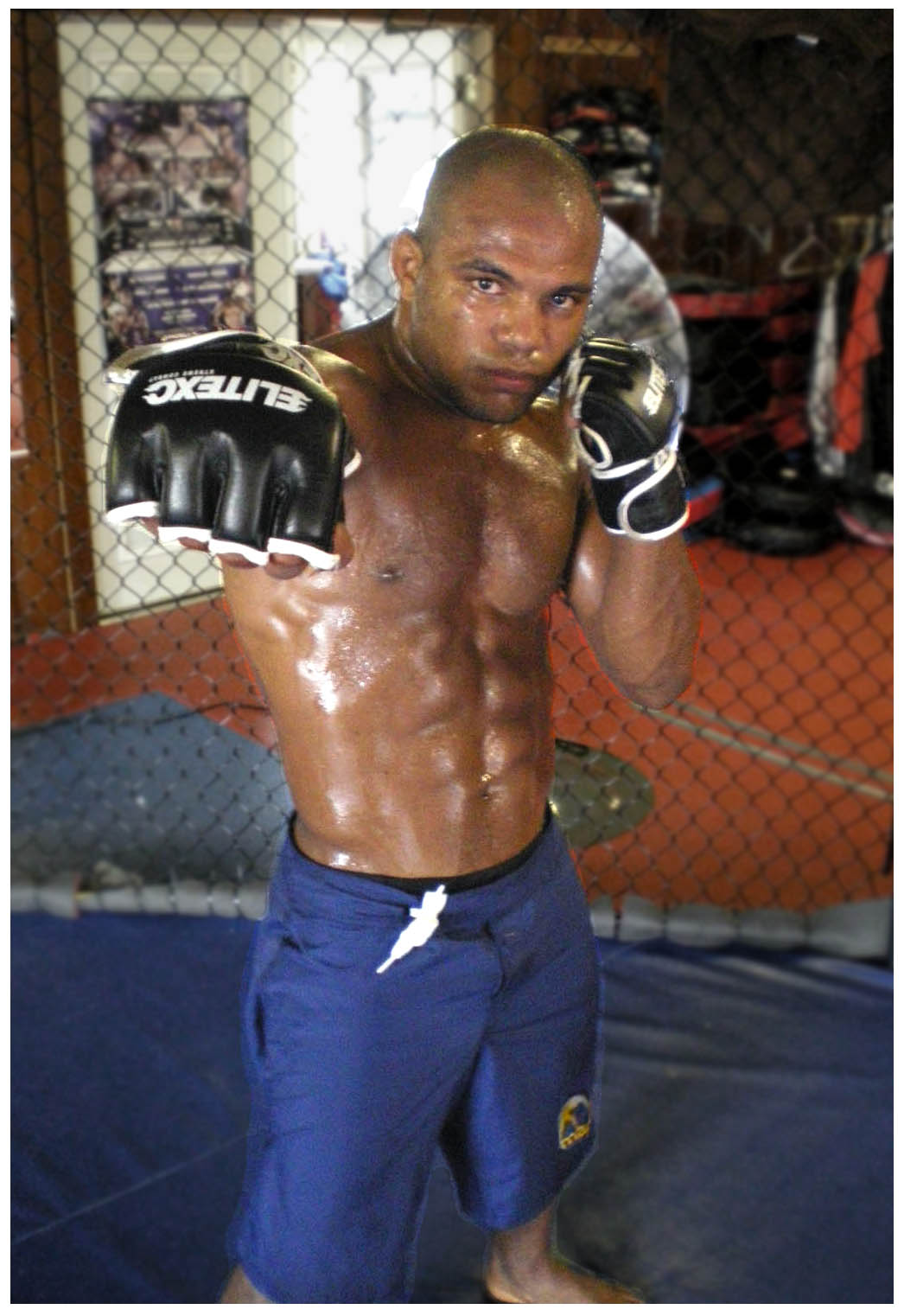
- Born: January 6, 1985 (age 41); Januária, Minas Gerais, Brazil Boxing,
- Height: 5 ft 4 in (1.63 m)
- Weight: 125 lb (57 kg; 8.9 st)
- Division: Flyweight; Bantamweight; Featherweight
- Reach: 65 in (165 cm)
- Style: Brazilian Jiu-Jitsu, Boxing, Submission Wrestling
- Stance: Southpaw
- Fighting out of: San Diego, California
- Team: Alliance MMA; G13 Brazilian Jiu-Jitsu
- Rank: Black belt in Brazilian Jiu-Jitsu under Roberto Godoi
- Years active: 2007–present

Mixed martial arts record
- Total: 43
- Wins: 28
- By submission: 13
- By decision: 15
- Losses: 15
- By knockout: 6
- By submission: 1
- By decision: 8

Other information
- Mixed martial arts record from Sherdog

Wilson Reis (born January 6, 1985) is a Brazilian mixed martial artist who competes in the Flyweight division. Reis is the former EliteXC Bantamweight Champion and has also competed for UFC, Bellator, ShoXC and Cage Warriors. Reis also appeared as an assistant Jiu-Jitsu coach in Dominick Cruz's team on The Ultimate Fighter: Live.

== Background ==
Reis received his black belt in Brazilian jiu-jitsu from instructor Roberto Godoi. As a brown belt he won the 2004 Jiu Jitsu World Championships. Reis was crowned the first and only EliteXC Bantamweight champion on September 26, 2008. He trains at BJJ United in Pennsylvania and at Daddis Fight Camps in New Jersey and Philadelphia. He previously taught Brazilian jiu-jitsu and No-gi at Tri-State Martial Arts Academy in Levittown, Pennsylvania. Reis formerly competed in Bellator Fighting Championships. He competed for the first time in his native Brazil in WFE 11 - Platinum, winning by submission.

== Mixed martial arts career ==
=== EliteXC ===
Reis debuted for the EliteXC promotion on their ShoXC series in January 2008. He later appeared on their main cards at EliteXC: Primetime and EliteXC: Unfinished Business.

In September 2008, Reis defeated Abel Cullum to win the vacant EliteXC Bantamweight Championship.

=== Bellator Fighting Championships ===
In January 2009, it was announced that Reis reached an exclusive agreement with Bellator Fighting Championships. Wilson Reis defeated Henry Martinez on April 10, 2009, at Bellator 2 in the first round of the Featherweight Tournament. He experienced his first loss against Joe Soto in the semi-finals at Bellator 6.

Reis was scheduled to make his Japanese debut for World Victory Road at Sengoku 12 on March 7, 2010. However, Reis withdrew from the show in order to compete in season 2 of the Bellator Fighting Championships.

Reis was victorious in the first round of the Bellator featherweight tournament, defeating Shad Lierley via submission in the third round, after dominating the entire fight with this superior ground game. He advanced to the semi-finals to face Patricio Freire who held a 13–0 record. Reis lost via unanimous decision, his second career loss.

Reis faced Deividas Taurosevičius on October 21, 2010, at Bellator 33. He won the fight via split decision.

Reis then competed in the Bellator Season Four Featherweight tournament and won his quarterfinal fight against Zac George at Bellator 37 by submission in the first round.

Reis then had a rematch with Patricio Freire in the semifinals at Bellator 41, but lost via KO in the third round.

Reis dropped down to Bantamweight and competed in the Bellator Season Five Bantamweight tournament. In the quarterfinals, he faced Eduardo Dantas at Bellator 51, losing by second-round KO (flying knee and punches).

=== Post-Bellator ===
After losing two consecutive fights in a row, Reis has been released from the Bellator promotion along with Dan Hornbuckle.

Reis then competed in Win Fight & Entertainment (WFE), appearing for the first time in his native Brazil in WFE 11 - Platinum in December 2011. He defeated Bruno "Demente" Menezes by rear naked choke.

On December 8, 2012, Reis fought for Europe's top organization Cage Warriors and defeated Owen Roddy by third-round submission in one of the fights of the year in Glasgow, Scotland.

=== Ultimate Fighting Championship ===
In August 2013, it was announced that Reis had signed with the UFC. Reis was expected to face Hugo Viana at UFC Fight Night 28 on September 4, 2013. However, just days before the event Viana was forced out of the bout with an injury, removing their fight from the card altogether.

A few days after that announcement, Reis was again sought as a replacement. He stepped in to face Ivan Menjivar on September 21, 2013, at UFC 165, replacing Norifumi Yamamoto. Reis was successful in his debut, winning via unanimous decision.

Reis faced Iuri Alcântara on February 15, 2014, at UFC Fight Night 36. He lost the fight via split decision.

Reis was briefly linked to a bout with Pedro Munhoz on May 31, 2014, at The Ultimate Fighter Brazil 3 Finale. However, the bout never materialized as Reis was replaced by promotional newcomer Matt Hobar.

For his next fight, Reis moved down to the flyweight division. He was expected to face Tim Elliott on August 23, 2014, at UFC Fight Night 49. However, Elliott pulled out of the bout in the days leading up to the event. Reis instead faced promotional newcomer Joby Sanchez. He won the fight by unanimous decision.

Reis next faced Scott Jorgensen on October 25, 2014, at UFC 179. He won the fight by submission in the first round. Reis hurt Jorgensen with a body kick and backed up in pain, then immediately after shot in and successfully got the takedown on Jorgensen and passed to mount where he secured to an arm-triangle choke where Jorgensen was forced to tap.

Reis faced Jussier Formiga on May 30, 2015, at UFC Fight Night 67. He lost the back-and-forth fight by unanimous decision.

Reis faced Dustin Ortiz on January 30, 2015, at UFC on Fox 18. He won the fight by unanimous decision.

Reis was expected to face current Flyweight Champion Demetrious Johnson on July 30, 2016, at UFC 201. However, on July 8, it was announced that Johnson pulled out due to an undisclosed injury and the bout was postponed. Reis remained on the card against promotional newcomer Hector Sandoval. He won the fight via submission in the first round.

Reis faced Ulka Sasaki on February 11, 2017, at UFC 208. He won the fight by unanimous decision.

=== UFC Flyweight Title Challenge ===
Reis faced Flyweight champion Demetrious Johnson on April 15, 2017 at UFC on Fox 24. After a one-sided affair through the first two rounds, Reis suffered his first loss by submission as Johnson won via armbar in the third round.

=== Post title shot ===
Reis faced Henry Cejudo on September 9, 2017 at UFC 215 He lost the fight via TKO in the second round.

Reis faced John Moraga on April 14, 2018 at UFC on Fox 29. He lost the fight via unanimous decision.

Reis faced Ben Nguyen on December 2, 2018 at UFC Fight Night 142. He won the fight via unanimous decision.

As the last fight of his prevailing contract, Reis faced Alexandre Pantoja on April 13, 2019 at UFC 236. He lost the fight via TKO in the first round. Subsequently, UFC opted not to renew Reis' contract.

=== ARES FC ===
On February 18, 2020, news surfaced that Reis signed a contract with ARES FC.

He made his promotional debut at Ares FC 2 against Taylor Lapilus on December 12, 2021. He lost the bout via unanimous decision.

=== Budo Sento Championship ===
Reis signed by Mexican promotion Budo Sento Championship (BSC) and faced Carlos Briseño at BSC 1 on November 14, 2020. He won the fight via second round submission.

Reis was knocked out in 16 seconds in a bout with Donny Matos at the BSC 2 on April 10, 2021.

=== Cage Warriors ===
Reis signed for Cage Warriors and he was then scheduled to face Johnny Campbell at Cage Warriors 126 on August 1, 2021. However, Reis withdrew from the bout due to an injury.

Reis faced Jeremiah Labiano on March 4, 2022 at Cage Warriors 133. He won the bout via split decision.

Reis faced Tuomas Grönvall on December 31, 2022, at Cage Warriors 148, winning the bout via unanimous decision.

Reis faced Johnny Campbell on March 3, 2023 at Cage Warriors 148, winning the bout via rear-naked choke in the third round.

Reis faced Trevin Jones on September 8, 2023 at Cage Warriors 159, losing the bout via split decision.

Reis faced Toby Misech on February 23. 2024 at Cage Warriors 166, winning via arm-triangle choke in the first round.

Reis faced fellow UFC veteran Brunzo Souza at Cage Warriors 173 on 8 June 2024. He lost the fight via unanimous decision.

== Grappling career ==
Wilson Reis is a Brazilian jiu-jitsu black belt under Roberto Godoi.

In 2004, Reis won the Brazilian jiu-jitsu World Championships as a Brown Belt.

On August 6, 2023 Reis won gold in the master 1 no gi lightweight division at the IBJJF San Diego Spring Open 2023.

== Championships and accomplishments ==
- EliteXC
  - EliteXC Bantamweight Championship (One time, First, Last)
- Win Fight Entertainment
  - WFE Bantamweight Championship (One time)

== Mixed martial arts record ==
Professional record breakdown
43 matches	28 wins	15 losses
By knockout	0	6
By submission	13	1
By decision	15	8

Res.	Record	Opponent	Method	Event	Date	Round	Time	Location	Notes
Loss	28–15	Julio Arce	KO (punch)	Victory Fighting League: Clash of the Champions	October 24, 2025	1	2:00	New York City, New York, United States	
Loss	28–14	Bruno Souza	Decision (unanimous)	Cage Warriors 173	June 7, 2024	3	5:00	San Diego, California, United States	
Win	28–13	Toby Misech	Submission (arm-triangle choke)	Cage Warriors 166	February 23, 2024	1	3:02	San Diego, California, United States	Return to Featherweight.
Loss	27–13	Trevin Jones	Decision (split)	Cage Warriors 159	September 8, 2023	3	5:00	San Diego, California, United States	
Win	27–12	Johnny Campbell	Submission (rear-naked choke)	Cage Warriors 149	March 3, 2023	3	2:20	San Diego, California, United States	
Win	26–12	Tuomas Grönvall	Decision (unanimous)	Cage Warriors 148	December 31, 2022	3	5:00	London, England	
Win	25–12	Jeremiah Labiano	Decision (split)	Cage Warriors 133	March 4, 2022	3	5:00	San Diego, California, United States	Featherweight bout.
Loss	24–12	Taylor Lapilus	Decision (unanimous)	Ares FC 2	December 11, 2021	3	5:00	Paris, France	Return to Bantamweight.
Loss	24–11	Donny Matos	KO (punch)	Budo Sento Championship 2	April 10, 2021	1	0:16	Mexico City, Mexico	
Win	24–10	Carlos Briseño	Submission (arm-triangle choke)	Budo Sento Championship 1	November 14, 2020	2	4:38	Mexico City, Mexico	
Loss	23–10	Alexandre Pantoja	TKO (punches)	UFC 236	April 13, 2019	1	2:58	Atlanta, Georgia, United States	
Win	23–9	Ben Nguyen	Decision (unanimous)	UFC Fight Night: dos Santos vs. Tuivasa	December 2, 2018	3	5:00	Adelaide, Australia	
Loss	22–9	John Moraga	Decision (unanimous)	UFC on Fox: Poirier vs. Gaethje	April 14, 2018	3	5:00	Glendale, Arizona, United States	
Loss	22–8	Henry Cejudo	TKO (punches)	UFC 215	September 9, 2017	2	0:25	Edmonton, Alberta, Canada	
Loss	22–7	Demetrious Johnson	Submission (armbar)	UFC on Fox: Johnson vs. Reis	April 15, 2017	3	4:49	Kansas City, Missouri, United States	For the UFC Flyweight Championship.
Win	22–6	Ulka Sasaki	Decision (unanimous)	UFC 208	February 11, 2017	3	5:00	Brooklyn, New York, United States	
Win	21–6	Hector Sandoval	Submission (rear-naked choke)	UFC 201	July 30, 2016	1	1:49	Atlanta, Georgia, United States	
Win	20–6	Dustin Ortiz	Decision (unanimous)	UFC on Fox: Johnson vs. Bader	January 30, 2016	3	5:00	Newark, New Jersey, United States	
Loss	19–6	Jussier Formiga	Decision (unanimous)	UFC Fight Night: Condit vs. Alves	May 30, 2015	3	5:00	Goiânia, Brazil	
Win	19–5	Scott Jorgensen	Submission (arm-triangle choke)	UFC 179	October 25, 2014	1	3:28	Rio de Janeiro, Brazil	Catchweight (128 lb) bout; Jorgensen missed weight.
Win	18–5	Joby Sanchez	Decision (unanimous)	UFC Fight Night: Henderson vs. dos Anjos	August 23, 2014	3	5:00	Tulsa, Oklahoma, United States	Flyweight debut.
Loss	17–5	Iuri Alcântara	Decision (split)	UFC Fight Night: Machida vs. Mousasi	February 15, 2014	3	5:00	Jaraguá do Sul, Brazil	
Win	17–4	Ivan Menjivar	Decision (unanimous)	UFC 165	September 21, 2013	3	5:00	Toronto, Ontario, Canada	
Win	16–4	Owen Roddy	Submission (rear-naked choke)	Cage Warriors 50	December 8, 2012	3	1:32	Glasgow, Scotland	Catchweight (140.2 lb) bout; Reis missed weight.
Win	15–4	Billy Vaughan	Submission (arm-triangle choke)	Matrix Fights 7	October 26, 2012	1	3:28	Philadelphia, Pennsylvania, United States	
Win	14–4	Cody Stevens	Decision (unanimous)	Matrix Fights 6	July 13, 2012	3	5:00	Philadelphia, Pennsylvania, United States	Catchweight (138 lb) bout.
Win	13–4	Bruno Menezes	Submission (rear-naked choke)	Win Fight & Entertainment 11	December 16, 2011	1	3:20	Salvador, Brazil	Won the WFE Bantamweight Championship.
Loss	12–4	Eduardo Dantas	KO (flying knee and punches)	Bellator 51	September 24, 2011	2	1:02	Canton, Ohio, United States	Return to Bantamweight. Bellator Season 5 Bantamweight Tournament Quarterfinal.
Loss	12–3	Patrício Pitbull	KO (punches)	Bellator 41	April 16, 2011	3	3:29	Yuma, Arizona, United States	Bellator Season 4 Featherweight Tournament Semifinal.
Win	12–2	Zac George	Submission (rear-naked choke)	Bellator 37	March 19, 2011	1	2:09	Concho, Oklahoma, United States	Bellator Season 4 Featherweight Tournament Quarterfinal.
Win	11–2	Deividas Taurosevicius	Decision (split)	Bellator 33	October 21, 2010	3	5:00	Philadelphia, Pennsylvania, United States	
Loss	10–2	Patrício Pitbull	Decision (unanimous)	Bellator 18	May 13, 2010	3	5:00	Monroe, Louisiana, United States	Bellator Season 2 Featherweight Tournament Semifinal.
Win	10–1	Shad Lierley	Submission (rear-naked choke)	Bellator 14	April 15, 2010	3	3:33	Hollywood, Florida, United States	Bellator Season 2 Featherweight Tournament Quarterfinal.
Win	9–1	Dwayne Shelton	Decision (unanimous)	Locked in the Cage 1	November 20, 2009	3	5:00	Philadelphia, Pennsylvania, United States	Won the Extreme Force Featherweight Championship.
Win	8–1	Roberto Vargas	Decision (split)	Bellator 10	June 5, 2009	3	5:00	Ontario, California, United States	
Loss	7–1	Joe Soto	Decision (unanimous)	Bellator 6	May 8, 2009	3	5:00	Robstown, Texas, United States	Bellator Season 1 Featherweight Tournament Semifinal.
Win	7–0	Henry Martinez	Decision (unanimous)	Bellator 2	April 10, 2009	3	5:00	Uncasville, Connecticut, United States	Return to Featherweight. Bellator Season 1 Featherweight Tournament Quarterfinal.
Win	6–0	Abel Cullum	Decision (unanimous)	ShoXC: Elite Challenger Series	September 26, 2008	5	5:00	Santa Ynez, California, United States	Won the inaugural Elite XC Bantamweight Championship.
Win	5–0	Bryan Caraway	Decision (unanimous)	EliteXC: Unfinished Business	July 26, 2008	3	5:00	Stockton, California, United States	
Win	4–0	Justin Robbins	Submission (rear-naked choke)	EliteXC: Primetime	May 31, 2008	1	4:06	Newark, New Jersey, United States	
Win	3–0	Zach Makovsky	Submission (arm-triangle choke)	ShoXC: Elite Challenger Series	January 25, 2008	2	1:15	Atlantic City, New Jersey, United States	Bantamweight debut.
Win	2–0	Diego Jimenez	Submission (rear-naked choke)	Combat in the Cage: Fearless Fighters Return	October 6, 2007	1	2:00	Trenton, New Jersey, United States	
Win	1–0	Baba Shigeyasu	Decision (unanimous)	Extreme Challenge 81	July 28, 2007	3	5:00	West Orange, New Jersey, United States	Featherweight debut.

== See also ==
- List of current UFC fighters
- List of male mixed martial artists

New championship	1st Elite XC Bantamweight Champion; September 26, 2008 - October 20, 2008	Succeeded by Elite XC ceased operations
