= Jared Hess (fighter) =

American mixed martial arts fighter

Jared “Judy” Hess
- Born: November 13, 1983 (age 42); Oklahoma City, Oklahoma, U.S.
- Other names: The Test
- Height: 6 ft 0 in (1.83 m)
- Weight: 185 lb (84 kg; 13.2 st)
- Division: Middleweight
- Fighting out of: San Diego, California
- Team: TheArenaMMA
- Rank: NCAA Division II Wrestling
- Years active: 2007-2011

Mixed martial arts record
- Total: 16
- Wins: 11
- By knockout: 3
- By submission: 8
- Losses: 4
- By knockout: 3
- By decision: 1
- Draws: 1

Other information
- Mixed martial arts record from Sherdog

Jared Hess (born November 13, 1983, in Oklahoma City, Oklahoma) is a retired American mixed martial artist. He is most known for his stint fighting for Bellator Fighting Championships in their middleweight division. He was runner up in the middleweight tournament after losing to Hector Lombard.

== Biography ==
Hess grew up in Oklahoma City, Oklahoma and attend Western Heights High School, Oklahoma City. While in high school, Hess was a standout football player and wrestler. His freshman year, his wrestling team went 2–8 but Hess was state champion for his weight. Hess had his first child in 2002 during his senior year.

After high school, Hess attended University of Central Oklahoma and graduated in 2007 with a degree in Industrial Safety and Criminal Justice. He also wrestled and was an All-American his senior year. During a trip to Las Vegas to attend his best friends get wedding he backed out of bungee jumping from the top of The Strat.

== Mixed martial arts ==
=== Bellator Fighting Championships ===
Hess entered the Bellator middleweight tournament on April 17, 2009. His first fight was against Daniel Tabera, Hess won the fight after taking Tabera down and applying a rear naked choke submission early in round one.

Hess then fought in the next round of the middleweight tournament against Yosmany Cabezas at Bellator 9. Hess won the fight via technical knockout in the third round.

In the finals of the middleweight tournament at the main event of Bellator 12, Hess lost to Cuban fighter Hector Lombard. The fight ended in a TKO doctor stoppage due to multiple cuts, which occurred from elbows delivered on the ground by Lombard. This fight earned the Bazzie Award for Bloodbath of the Year.

Hess returned for the second season tournament in April 2010, hoping to get a rematch with Lombard and win the middleweight title. His first fight was against former IFL middleweight champion Ryan McGivern, whom he defeated via submission.

Hess lost his semi-final bout against Alexander Shlemenko on May 27. Despite controlling the first two rounds, Hess was on the receiving end of a flying knee from Shlemenko midway through the third round. As a result of the strike, Hess fell awkwardly on his left leg and severely dislocated his knee, causing the referee to stop the bout. His knee required surgery and kept him out of action for six months.

At Bellator 42, Hess returned from his knee injury at Bellator 20 eleven months prior. He fought Chris Bell on the undercard. Bell missed weight, and the fight was changed to a catchweight bout of 190 lbs. Hess dictated the pace of the fight, and won via triangle choke submission early in round one. The win earned Hess a spot in the Bellator Season Five Middleweight tournament.

Hess' first fight in the Bellator Season Five Middleweight tournament took place on September 17, 2011, at Bellator 50 against Bryan Baker. Though he controlled round 1 with dominant ground control and effective striking, Hess lost the fight in the third round via TKO.

Hess fought Brett Cooper on the undercard of Bellator 58 on November 19, 2011. Hess lost the fight via unanimous decision. Hess was released from the promotion after the loss.

== Mixed martial arts record ==
Professional record breakdown
16 matches	11 wins	4 losses
By knockout	3	3
By submission	8	0
By decision	0	1
Draws	1	

Res.	Record	Opponent	Method	Event	Date	Round	Time	Location	Notes
Loss	11–4–1	Brett Cooper	Decision (unanimous)	Bellator 58	November 19, 2011	3	5:00	Hollywood, Florida, United States	
Loss	11–3–1	Bryan Baker	TKO (punches)	Bellator 50	September 17, 2011	3	2:52	Hollywood, Florida, United States	Bellator Season 5 Middleweight Tournament Quarterfinal
Win	11–2–1	Chris Bell	Submission (triangle choke)	Bellator 42	April 23, 2011	1	1:40	Concho, Oklahoma, United States	Catchweight bout of 190 lb
Loss	10–2–1	Alexander Shlemenko	TKO (knee injury)	Bellator 20	May 27, 2010	3	2:20	San Antonio, Texas, United States	Bellator Season 2 Middleweight Tournament Semifinal
Win	10–1–1	Ryan McGivern	Submission (guillotine choke)	Bellator 16	April 29, 2010	2	1:54	Kansas City, Missouri, United States	Bellator Season 2 Middleweight Tournament Quarterfinal
Win	9–1–1	Keith Johnson	Submission (rear-naked choke)	BB 3: Holiday Havoc	December 19, 2009	1	2:18	Oklahoma City, Oklahoma, United States	
Loss	8–1–1	Hector Lombard	TKO (doctor stoppage)	Bellator 12	June 19, 2009	4	1:41	Hollywood, Florida, United States	Bellator Season 1 Middleweight Tournament Final; For Bellator Middleweight Championship
Win	8–0–1	Yosmany Cabezas	TKO (punches)	Bellator 9	May 29, 2009	3	4:26	Monroe, Louisiana, United States	Bellator Season 1 Middleweight Tournament Semifinal
Win	7–0–1	Daniel Tabera	Submission (rear-naked choke)	Bellator 4	April 17, 2009	1	2:34	Norman, Oklahoma, United States	Bellator Season 1 Middleweight Tournament Quarterfinal
Win	6–0–1	Jason Anderson	Submission (guillotine choke)	C3 Fights: Knockout-Rockout Weekend 1	January 30, 2009	1	0:19	Clinton, Oklahoma, United States	
Win	5–0–1	Mike Queen	Submission (rear naked choke)	C3 Fights: Contenders	June 7, 2008	1	2:42	Concho, Oklahoma, United States	
Win	4–0–1	Kristopher Flores	TKO (cut)	King of Kombat 3	April 5, 2008	1	1:52	Austin, Texas, United States	
Draw	3–0–1	Nate James	Draw	CCCF: Heroes	February 16, 2008	3	N/A	Oklahoma City, Oklahoma, United States	
Win	3–0	Keith Richards	Submission	Masters of the Cage 17	November 17, 2007	1	3:59	Oklahoma City, Oklahoma, United States	
Win	2–0	Dominic Brown	TKO (punches)	Masters of the Cage 16	September 28, 2007	1	2:37	Oklahoma City, Oklahoma, United States	
Win	1–0	Richard Harris	Submission	Warriors of the Cage 2	July 28, 2007	1	0:33	Oklahoma City, Oklahoma, United States	
