= Omar de la Cruz (fighter) =

Dominican mixed martial arts fighter

- Born: Jesús Omar De La Cruz; November 5, 1979 (age 46); Santo Domingo, Dominican Republic
- Other names: El Diablo
- Nationality: Dominican
- Height: 5 ft 11 in (1.80 m)
- Weight: 170 lb (77 kg; 12 st)
- Division: Welterweight
- Fighting out of: Santo Domingo, Dominican Republic
- Team: Fight Training Academy
- Rank: black belt in Brazilian Jiu-Jitsu; 4th degree black belt in Taekwondo

Mixed martial arts record
- Total: 9
- Wins: 6
- By knockout: 2
- By submission: 2
- By decision: 2
- Losses: 3
- By knockout: 2
- By decision: 1

Other information
- Mixed martial arts record from Sherdog

Jesús Omar de la Cruz (born November 5, 1979, in Santo Domingo, Dominican Republic), is a Dominican professional mixed martial artist. Cruz is most known for his stint in Bellator Fighting Championships, fighting in its welterweight division.

== Mixed martial arts ==
Omar is a fourth degree Black Belt in Taekwondo, and has been practicing the Korean martial art for 16 years, competing mostly in full-contact competitions. In 2001 he was introduced to Brazilian jiu-jitsu, rising steadily to the rank of Brown Belt under Dominican 1st degree black belt Abraham Tabar.

Cruz currently trains at his own gym, Fight Training Academy in his hometown of Santo Domingo, the only mixed martial arts gym in the country. Omar also acts as instructor in four other gyms. Omar had his first professional mixed martial arts bout on March 10, 2007, at the event Alianza Nacional Full Contact against Team ROC's Seth Horn, winning the fight via submission.

On August 29, 2009, Omar de la Cruz was promoted to brown belt under his instructor, Abraham Tabar.

On November 5, 2016, Omar de la Cruz was promoted to black belt in Brazilian Jiu-Jitsu under his instructor, Abraham Tabar.

=== Bellator Fighting Championships ===
Omar was signed by Bellator Fighting Championships and is competing in their welterweight division. Cruz is participating in the tournament that began on April 10, 2009. Omar's first opponent was the previously undefeated Victor Meza, who was coming in on a nine-fight undefeated winning streak. Cruz won via unanimous decision after dominating in all three rounds.

Cruz's second fight for Bellator would be against former UFC middleweight champion Dave Menne, the fighter with the most extensive background Cruz would face to the date. The fight was a semi-final bout in the tournament and took place at Bellator 7. Omar traveled to California to train with personal friend, Brandon Vera in preparation for the match. The bout began with Menne rushing in on Cruz, clinching and eventually landing on top after a takedown. Omar worked to his guard, effectively defending punches coming from the top. Managing to get to his feet some moments later, Omar landed a straight on Menne's chin sending him to the canvas. Menne worked butterfly guard, eventually prompting de la Cruz to get up, then surprised him with vicious dropping fists from the top, causing serious damage. Impressively, Menne managed to get up and continue, only to receive kicks and punches resulting in a technical knockout in the first round.

In the Bellator welterweight finals, which took place at Bellator 11, Omar fought Lyman Good. Cruz was defeated by Good via TKO early in the first round, losing his bid for Bellator's welterweight title.

=== Sengoku ===
At Sengoku 13, Omar entered the Welterweight Grand Prix, after suffering from food poisoning and fever since arriving to Japan his team decided not to cancel the fight and after struggling to make weight and not being able to recover from the weight cut he lost to Keita Nakamura via TKO in the second round.

== Mixed martial arts record ==
Professional record breakdown
9 matches	6 wins	3 losses
By knockout	2	2
By submission	2	0
By decision	2	1

Res.	Record	Opponent	Method	Event	Date	Round	Time	Location	Notes
Loss	6–3	Keita Nakamura	TKO (punches)	World Victory Road Presents: Sengoku Raiden Championships 13	June 20, 2010	2	3:53	Tokyo, Japan	Welterweight Grand Prix Opening Round
Win	6–2	Prince McLean	TKO (punches)	C3 Fights: Knockout-Rockout Weekend 2	April 17, 2010	2	1:30	Clinton, Oklahoma, United States	
Loss	5–2	Lyman Good	TKO (punches)	Bellator 11	June 12, 2009	1	1:23	Uncasville, Connecticut, United States	Welterweight Tournament Final
Win	5–1	Dave Menne	TKO (punches)	Bellator 7	May 15, 2009	1	3:19	Chicago, Illinois, United States	Welterweight Tournament Semifinal
Win	4–1	Victor Meza	Decision (unanimous)	Bellator 2	April 10, 2009	3	5:00	Uncasville, Connecticut, United States	Welterweight Tournament Quarterfinal
Win	3–1	Jason Potter	Submission (armbar)	Alianza National Full Contact 2	August 8, 2008	1	1:16	Santo Domingo, Dominican Republic	
Win	2–1	Aaron Barrios	Decision (unanimous)	Total Combat 27	March 22, 2008	3	5:00	Yuma, Arizona, United States	
Loss	1–1	Marcelo Brito	Decision (split)	MMAC: The Revolution	May 12, 2007	3	5:00	Washington, D.C., United States	
Win	1–0	Seth Horn	Submission (rear-naked choke)	Alianza National Full Contact 1	March 10, 2007	2	4:38	Santo Domingo, Dominican Republic	
