= Joe Soto =

American mixed martial arts fighter

- Born: March 22, 1987 (age 39); Porterville, California, United States
- Other names: One Bad Mofo; The Hammer (formerly)
- Height: 5 ft 6 in (1.68 m)
- Weight: 135 lb (61 kg; 9.6 st)
- Division: Featherweight; Bantamweight
- Reach: 65 in (165 cm)
- Style: Boxing, Brazilian Jiu-Jitsu
- Fighting out of: Santa Rosa, California, United States
- Team: Nor-Cal Fighting Alliance
- Rank: Black belt in Brazilian Jiu-Jitsu under Dave Terrell
- Wrestling: NJCAA Wrestling
- Years active: 2006–2018

Mixed martial arts record
- Total: 25
- Wins: 18
- By knockout: 5
- By submission: 10
- By decision: 3
- Losses: 7
- By knockout: 4
- By submission: 2
- By decision: 1

Other information
- Notable school: Iowa Central Community College
- Mixed martial arts record from Sherdog

Joseph Angel Soto (born March 22, 1987) is an American professional mixed martial artist who most recently competed in the bantamweight division of the Ultimate Fighting Championship (UFC). A professional competitor since 2006, Soto has also formerly competed for Bellator Fighting Championships, where he was the inaugural Bellator Featherweight World Champion and first ever winner of their Featherweight Tournament, and for Tachi Palace Fights where he is the former Tachi Palace Fights Bantamweight Champion.

== Background ==
At the time Soto was born, the fourth son, his parents were struggling financially, with his father working as a garbage man and his mother as a house cleaner. Soto grew up in a very religious Pentecostal family, attending church with his family weekly. Soto started wrestling in junior high 8th grade and also played pop warner football. Soto went to Porterville High School in California where he was on the wrestling team and won a California state title. Soto got an athletic scholarship to Iowa Central Community College was a 2x NJCAA All-American. There Soto wrestled with Jon Jones, Colby Covington and fellow Mexican American Cain Velasquez.

== Mixed martial arts ==
Soto began training mixed martial arts after meeting another fighter who agreed to train him in his garage. Soto began training and took his first fight at a Gladiator Challenge event. Soto won the fight midway in the first round via technical knockout. Soto compiled a 4–0 record before getting signed to Bellator Fighting Championships.

=== Bellator ===
Soto joined Bellator by entering their Season One Featherweight Tournament. Soto made his debut defeating Ben Greer at Bellator 1.

In Soto's semi-final fight, which took place May 8 at Bellator 6, he dominated Wilson Reis from the opening bell with impeccable takedown defense and superior striking. Despite being a Brazilian Jiu-Jitsu black belt and the only EliteXC Featherweight Champion, Reis could never get the fight to the ground.

Soto advanced to the Bellator Featherweight Finals and took on Yahir Reyes. Soto won the fight by submission in the second round and became the first Bellator Featherweight Champion. A few days before the championships, Soto cut his eyelid while wrestling during a warm-up and had to go to the hospital. Knowing stitches were not an option, he and his friends went to a beauty parlor to have the cut covered with make-up. While the doctor was inspecting Soto, his camp made sure to crack jokes and distract the specialist from noticing the cut over his eye.

At Bellator 19, Soto fought Diego Saraiva in a "Super Fight". Soto won the fight after cage side doctors said Saraiva was unable to continue because of a cut on his forehead.

Soto had his first title defense in the third season, taking on the winner of the Season Two Featherweight Tournament, Joe Warren. Following a dominant first round Soto was knocked unconscious by Warren at 0:33 of the second round. In the fight, Soto suffered a detached retina and was forced to stay away from fighting for nearly a year.

Bellator promoter, Bjorn Rebney, stated that Soto was eligible to drop down a weight class for Bellator's Season Five Bantamweight Tournament with a win at Tachi Palace Fights 10. Soto lost to Eddie Yagin by first-round submission, and was replaced in the tournament. After the loss to Yagin, Soto was released from his Bellator contract.

=== Tachi Palace Fights ===
In January 2012 Soto picked up a win over Chris David and was signed to fight for Tachi Palace Fights. Soto fought his first TPF fight on May 10, 2012, against former WEC fighter, Chad George. Soto won the fight via second-round submission.

=== Ultimate Fighting Championship ===
In August 2014 Soto signed a deal with the UFC.

Soto was expected to face Anthony Birchak on August 30, 2014, at UFC 177. However, the day of the weigh-ins, Renan Barão had to be admitted to the hospital as a result of his attempts to cut weight. Soto stepped up and faced champion T.J. Dillashaw in the main event. He lost the fight via knockout in the fifth round.

A rescheduled bout with Anthony Birchak took place on June 6, 2015, at UFC Fight Night 68. Soto lost the fight via knockout in the first round.

Soto faced Michinori Tanaka on January 2, 2016, at UFC 195, filling in for an injured Russell Doane. He lost the fight by split decision.

Soto next faced Chris Beal on June 18, 2016, at UFC Fight Night 89. He won the back and forth fight via submission in the third round.

Soto was tabbed as a short notice replacement to face Marco Beltrán in a catchweight bout on November 5, 2016, at The Ultimate Fighter Latin America 3 Finale. He won the fight via submission in the first round.

Soto faced Rani Yahya on March 11, 2017, at UFC Fight Night 106. He won the back-and-forth fight via unanimous decision.

Soto faced Brett Johns on December 1, 2017, at The Ultimate Fighter 26 Finale. He lost the fight via submission in round one.

Soto faced Iuri Alcântara on February 3, 2018, at UFC Fight Night 125. The bout with Alcântara marked the last fight of Soto's four-fight contract with UFC. He lost the fight via TKO due to strikes in the first round.

On August 28, 2018, it was reported that Soto was released by UFC.

== Brazilian Jiu Jitsu ==
On August 15, 2015, Soto competed in Eddie Bravo Invitational 4 (The Bantamweights).

Soto entered the competition as an underdog, and his first bout was against Eddie Fyvie. Soto won the bout via heel hook in the opening round.

Soto then progressed into the quarterfinals, where he faced 2 time EBI champion Geo Martinez. He won the bout via quickest escape time during overtime.

Soto then progressed into the semifinals, where he faced Joao Miyao (another world-class opponent). He won the bout via quickest escape time during overtime.

Soto then progressed to the finals, where he faced leg lock specialist and favourite of the competition Eddie Cummings. Soto defended many of Cummings' leg lock attempts for several minutes until finally succumbing to a heel hook.

== Championships and accomplishments ==
=== Mixed martial arts ===
- Tachi Palace Fights
  - TPF Bantamweight Championship (One time)
- Bellator Fighting Championships
  - Bellator Featherweight World Championship (One time; first)
  - Bellator Season One Featherweight Tournament Winner

=== Amateur wrestling ===
- National Junior College Athletic Association
  - NJCAA Junior Collegiate Championship Runner-up (2007)
  - NJCAA Junior Collegiate Championship 3rd Place (2006)
  - NJCAA All-American (2006, 2007)
- National High School Coaches Association
  - NHSCA Senior All-American (2005)
- California Interscholastic Federation
  - CIF High School State Championship (2005)
  - CIF All-State (2003, 2005)
  - CIF Central Section Championship (2005)

=== Grappling ===
- Eddie Bravo Invitational
  - EBI 4 Finalist (2015)

== Mixed martial arts record ==
Professional record breakdown
25 matches	18 wins	7 losses
By knockout	5	4
By submission	10	2
By decision	3	1

Res.	Record	Opponent	Method	Event	Date	Round	Time	Location	Notes
Loss	18–7	Iuri Alcântara	TKO (body kick and punches)	UFC Fight Night: Machida vs. Anders	February 3, 2018	1	1:06	Belém, Brazil	
Loss	18–6	Brett Johns	Submission (calf slicer)	The Ultimate Fighter: A New World Champion Finale	December 1, 2017	1	0:30	Las Vegas, Nevada, United States	
Win	18–5	Rani Yahya	Decision (unanimous)	UFC Fight Night: Belfort vs. Gastelum	March 11, 2017	3	5:00	Fortaleza, Brazil	
Win	17–5	Marco Beltrán	Submission (heel hook)	The Ultimate Fighter Latin America 3 Finale: dos Anjos vs. Ferguson	November 5, 2016	1	1:37	Mexico City, Mexico	Catchweight (140 lbs) bout.
Win	16–5	Chris Beal	Submission (rear-naked choke)	UFC Fight Night: MacDonald vs. Thompson	June 18, 2016	3	3:39	Ottawa, Ontario, Canada	
Loss	15–5	Michinori Tanaka	Decision (split)	UFC 195	January 2, 2016	3	5:00	Las Vegas, Nevada, United States	
Loss	15–4	Anthony Birchak	KO (punches)	UFC Fight Night: Boetsch vs. Henderson	June 6, 2015	1	1:37	New Orleans, Louisiana, United States	
Loss	15–3	T.J. Dillashaw	KO (head kick and punches)	UFC 177	August 30, 2014	5	2:20	Sacramento, California, United States	For the UFC Bantamweight Championship.
Win	15–2	Terrion Ware	Submission (north-south choke)	Tachi Palace Fights 20	August 7, 2014	3	2:48	Lemoore, California, United States	
Win	14–2	Jeremiah Labiano	TKO (doctor stoppage)	Tachi Palace Fights 18	February 6, 2014	3	4:16	Lemoore, California, United States	Won the vacant TPF Bantamweight Championship.
Win	13–2	Cory Vom Baur	Submission (guillotine choke)	Tachi Palace Fights 17	November 14, 2013	1	4:36	Lemoore, California, United States	
Win	12–2	Chad George	Technical Submission (rear-naked choke)	Tachi Palace Fights 13	May 10, 2012	2	2:01	Lemoore, California, United States	
Win	11–2	Chris David	Submission (rear-naked choke)	TWC 13: Impact	January 27, 2012	2	4:28	Porterville, California, United States	
Win	10–2	Romeo McCovey	Decision (unanimous)	NFF: Norcal Fight Fest	October 15, 2011	3	5:00	Blue Lake, California, United States	Bantamweight debut.
Loss	9–2	Eddie Yagin	Submission (guillotine choke)	TPF 10: Let The Chips Fall	August 5, 2011	1	2:00	Lemoore, California, United States	For the vacant TPF Featherweight Championship.
Loss	9–1	Joe Warren	KO (knee and punches)	Bellator 27	September 2, 2010	2	0:33	San Antonio, Texas, United States	Lost the Bellator Featherweight World Championship.
Win	9–0	Diego Saraiva	TKO (doctor stoppage)	Bellator 19	May 20, 2010	1	5:00	Grand Prairie, Texas, United States	Non-title bout.
Win	8–0	Mike Christensen	Submission (gogoplata)	TPF 1: Tachi Palace Fights 1	October 8, 2009	1	2:06	Lemoore, California, United States	
Win	7–0	Yahir Reyes	Submission (rear-naked choke)	Bellator 10	June 5, 2009	2	4:11	Ontario, California, United States	Won the Bellator Featherweight World Championship.
Win	6–0	Wilson Reis	Decision (unanimous)	Bellator 6	May 8, 2009	3	5:00	Robstown, Texas, United States	Bellator Season One Featherweight Tournament Semifinal.
Win	5–0	Ben Greer	TKO (punches)	Bellator 1	April 3, 2009	1	3:40	Hollywood, Florida, United States	Bellator Season One Featherweight Tournament Quarterfinal.
Win	4–0	Anthony Luna	Submission (kimura)	Gladiator Challenge 86: Day of the Dead	November 2, 2008	1	0:33	Miami, Florida, United States	
Win	3–0	Brandon Jinnies	TKO (punches)	PFC 10: Explosive	September 26, 2008	1	0:59	Lemoore, California, United States	
Win	2–0	Darren Crisp	Submission (kneebar)	PFC 9: The Return	July 18, 2008	1	1:08	Lemoore, California, United States	
Win	1–0	Jared Williams	TKO (punches)	Gladiator Challenge 53: Hell Storm	July 16, 2006	1	3:26	Porterville, California, United States	

== See also ==
- List of current UFC fighters
- List of male mixed martial artists
- List of Bellator champions

New championship	1st Bellator Featherweight Championship; June 6, 2009 - September 2, 2010	Succeeded by Joe Warren
