= Víctor Meza =

Argentine footballer

Personal information
- Full name: Víctor Damián Meza
- Date of birth: 28 January 1987 (age 39)
- Place of birth: Buenos Aires, Argentina
- Height: 1.89 m (6 ft 2 in)
- Position: Forward

Senior career*
| Years | Team | Apps | (Gls) |
| 2008–2009 | Sportivo Italiano | 27 | (12) |
| 2009 | San Lorenzo | 1 | (0) |
| 2010–2011 | Unión San Felipe | 31 | (8) |
| 2011–2012 | Olhanense | 7 | (0) |
| 2012–2013 | Deportivo Morón | 12 | (0) |
| 2013–2014 | Platense | 17 | (2) |
| 2014–2015 | Almirante Brown | 45 | (8) |
| 2016 | Sportivo Italiano | 28 | (6) |
| 2017 | Midland | 18 | (2) |
| 2017–2018 | Cañuelas | 27 | (3) |
| 2018–2019 | Leandro N. Alem | 42 | (12) |
| 2020 | Midland | 7 | (1) |
| Total | | 262 | (54) |
- * Club domestic league appearances and goals

Víctor Damián Meza (born 28 January 1987) is an Argentine former footballer who played as a forward.

== Career ==
Abroad, Meza played in Chile for Unión San Felipe and Portugal for Olhanense.

His last club was Ferrocarril Midland in 2020.

== Honours ==
=== Player ===
Sportivo Italiano

- Primera B Metropolitana (1): 2008–09
