= Bellator MMA =

American mixed martial arts promoter

Bellator Sport Worldwide
- Sport: Mixed martial arts
- Founded: 2008; 18 years ago
- Founder: Bjorn Rebney
- Folded: January 14, 2025
- Owners: Bjorn Rebney (2008–2011); Paramount Global (2011–2023); Professional Fighters League (2023–2025)
- President: Scott Coker (2014–2023)
- Country: United States
- Headquarters: Hollywood, California
- Broadcasters: Max; DAZN
- Website: bellator.com

Bellator MMA (formerly Bellator Fighting Championships) was an American mixed martial arts promotion founded in 2008 by Bjorn Rebney and operated until 2025. The promotion takes its name from bellātor, the Latin word for "warrior". Bellator's first event was in 2009, and the promotion held 313 "numbered" events.

Bellator was considered the second-largest MMA promotion in the United States, and one of the largest combat sport promotions in the world. Paramount Global (formerly Viacom) purchased majority ownership of Bellator from Rebney in 2011, with Paramount's television networks serving as the promotion's media broadcasters in the United States. On November 20, 2023, after then-broadcast home Showtime announced the discontinuation of its sports division, Bellator MMA was acquired by the Professional Fighters League (PFL).

== History ==
Bellator was founded in 2008 by Chairman and CEO Bjorn Rebney. Under Rebney's ownership, Bellator events were structured around single-elimination tournaments. In December 2011, Viacom purchased majority ownership of Bellator.

In May 2014, Bellator hosted the company's inaugural pay-per-view event, Bellator 120, from the Landers Center in Southaven, Mississippi, a suburb of Memphis, Tennessee. The event was headlined by Quinton "Rampage" Jackson vs. Muhammed "King Mo" Lawal.

In June 2014, it was announced that both Chairman/CEO Bjorn Rebney and President Tim Danaher were relieved of their positions. Rebney was succeeded by Strikeforce founder Scott Coker. Under Coker, Bellator would drop its season-long tournament format in early 2015, transitioning into more of a traditional, single-fight event schedule. From 2018 through 2023, Bellator has also hosted divisional grand-prix tournaments.

=== Sale to PFL and closure ===
In October 2023, Showtime announced that it would discontinue its sports division, with any future sports programming being handled by CBS Sports moving forward, and the division "continu[ing] to air and support the remaining 2023 boxing slate and honor obligations through the end of the year". It was reported that Paramount Global was concurrently seeking to sell Bellator. Bellator 301 was subsequently promoted as the promotion's final event on Showtime.

On November 20, 2023, it was announced that the Professional Fighters League had acquired Bellator MMA; fighters contracted to Bellator will be able to compete in PFL events. PFL founder Donn Davis announced a planned "mega event" in 2024 that would feature PFL champions fighting against Bellator champions (PFL vs. Bellator), and that it would retain the "Bellator" brand for the new "Bellator Champions Series" cards. In March 2024, it was announced that the media rights to Bellator had been acquired by TNT Sports, with events moving to Max and supplemental content on TruTV.

On January 15, 2025, PFL executives revealed that the Bellator promotion would cease operations, and that the PFL and Bellator rosters would be consolidated.

== Broadcast ==
Since the fourth season in 2011, Bellator cards have been predominantly broadcast on Viacom-owned networks in the United States. Beginning in January 2013, Bellator telecasts were moved from MTV2 to Spike (later relaunched as Paramount Network in 2018) following the end of the latter channel's partnership with the UFC. In September 2013, Bellator signed a multi-year partnership agreement with Fox Sports Latin America.

On June 26, 2018, Bellator announced a five-year streaming deal with DAZN, covering the U.S. and other markets served by the sports-oriented streaming service. Since Bellator 206, this includes all events aired by Paramount Network, as well as seven exclusive cards per-year. In March 2020, Bellator announced a deal with ESPN Brasil to broadcast events in the country.

Following Viacom's re-merger with CBS Corporation in 2019, CBS Sports Network debuted the recap series, Bellator MMA: Recharged, on April 25, 2020.

Due to problems stemming from COVID-19 pandemic, the contract with DAZN was consensually and prematurely discontinued in 2020. On September 11, 2020, it was announced that Bellator cards would move to CBS Sports Network starting October 1, with preliminary bouts to stream on YouTube and CBSSports.com.

Five months later, on February 9, 2021, it was announced that Bellator events would air exclusively on Showtime beginning with Bellator 255 on April 2, 2021. The following day, it was announced that the BBC would also broadcast Bellator events on BBC iPlayer in the United Kingdom. With Showtime opting to dissolve its sports division and focus more on scripted programming, Bellator's deal with Showtime came to a close at the end of 2023, with Bellator 301 serving as the final event on the platform on November 17, 2023.

On February 1, 2023, Bellator announced that they had signed a two-year contract with Grupo Globo to broadcast Bellator events in Brazil on its Combate channel, after years of broadcasting through ESPN. A few weeks later on February 22, 2023, the promotion announced that they had signed a multi-year extension with the BBC.

On March 19, 2024, PFL announced a new broadcasting agreement with Warner Bros. Discovery, with Bellator Championship Series cards and library programming streaming on HBO Max, and supplemental content (including the behind-the-scenes programs Fight Camp Confidential and Fight Week) airing on TruTV. It also a new rights deal with Anthem Sports & Entertainment in Canada and several other countries via Fight Network.

== Last champions ==
Men

Division	Last Champion	Deactivated on
Heavyweight	(United States) Ryan Bader	March 26, 2025
Light Heavyweight	(United States) Corey Anderson	October 3, 2025
Middleweight	(United States) Johnny Eblen	July 19, 2025
Welterweight	(Russia) Ramazan Kuramagomedov	February 7, 2026
Lightweight	(Russia) Usman Nurmagomedov	October 3, 2025
Featherweight	(Brazil) Patrício Pitbull	April 12, 2025
Bantamweight	(United States) Patchy Mix	May 13, 2025

Women

Division	Last Champion	Deactivated on
Featherweight	(Brazil) Cris Cyborg	December 13, 2025
Flyweight	(United States) Liz Carmouche	October 16, 2026
Strawweight	(United States) Zoila Frausto	February 5, 2013

== Events ==
=== Fight Master ===
On February 5, 2013, Bellator and Spike announced the launch of a new reality competition series titled Fight Master: Bellator MMA. The coaches and trainers for the series, which will feature 32 welterweight fighters, will be Randy Couture, Frank Shamrock, Greg Jackson, and Joe Warren. The 32 fighters competed for a spot in Bellator's fall welterweight tournament, culminating in a live season finale. The series premiered on Spike on June 19, 2013, and ran for a single season.

=== Bellator Kickboxing ===
In 2016, Bellator Kickboxing, a sibling kickboxing promotion was founded. Its inaugural event, Bellator Kickboxing 1, was held on April 16, 2016.

=== Tournament History ===
==== Season One ====
Bellator Fighting Championships: Season One (April 3, 2009 – June 19, 2009)

During Bellator's first season, events were broadcast nationally on ESPN Deportes in the United States. Bellator 1 took place on April 3, 2009, and like many events that season, aired via tape delay. Tournaments took place in the middleweight, welterweight, lightweight and featherweight divisions with the winners becoming the inaugural Bellator World Champions in their specific weight class. Héctor Lombard defeated Jared Hess in the finals of the middleweight tournament to become the 185 lb champion while Lyman Good defeated Omar De La Cruz to secure the Bellator Welterweight Title. In addition, Eddie Alvarez defeated Toby Imada to win the Bellator Lightweight Belt while Joe Soto defeated Yahir Reyes to become the Bellator Featherweight Champion. Color commentary for Bellator's first season was provided by Jon Anik and Jason Chambers.

- Winners:

Weight division	Winner	Runner-up	Event
Middleweight	Héctor Lombard	Jared Hess	Bellator 12
Welterweight	Lyman Good	Omar De La Cruz	Bellator 11
Lightweight	Eddie Alvarez	Toby Imada	Bellator 12
Featherweight	Joe Soto	Yahir Reyes	Bellator 10

==== Season Two ====
Bellator Fighting Championships: Season Two (April 8, 2010 – June 24, 2010)

For Bellator's second season, events aired nationally on FOX Sports Net in the United States. Season two debuted on April 8, 2010, and like season one, hosted tournaments in the middleweight, welterweight, lightweight and featherweight divisions. Alexander Shlemenko defeated Bryan Baker (fighter) to become the Middleweight Tournament Champion while Ben Askren defeated Dan Hornbuckle to win the 170 lb tournament. Also, Pat Curran defeated Toby Imada to win the lightweight tournament and Joe Warren (fighter) defeated Patricio Pitbull to become the Featherweight Tournament Champion. Season two tournament champions were awarded a check for $100,000 and a title shot against the Season 1 Champions. In addition to the tournament fights, season two was the first season to host non-tournament, non-title super fights for current champions. Three of Bellator's four champions competed in super fights during Season 2. Middleweight Champion Hector Lombard scored the fastest knockout in Bellator history when he defeated Jay Silva in a catch weight bout at Bellator 18. Also, Lightweight Champion Eddie Alvarez submitted Josh Neer in a catch weight bout at Bellator 17 and Joe Soto scored a technical knockout victory over Diego Saraiva in a featherweight bout at Bellator 19. Welterweight Champion Lyman Good was the only champion to not participate in a season two non-title super fight. Bellator also introduced the new commentary team of Jimmy Smith and Sean Wheelock during Season 2.

- Winners:

Weight division	Winner	Runner-up	Event
Middleweight	Alexander Shlemenko	Bryan Baker	Bellator 23
Welterweight	Ben Askren	Dan Hornbuckle	Bellator 22
Lightweight	Pat Curran	Toby Imada	Bellator 21
Featherweight	Joe Warren	Patricio Freire	Bellator 23

==== Season Three ====
Bellator Fighting Championships: Season Three (August 12, 2010 – October 28, 2010)

Bellator kicked off its third season on August 12, 2010, with tournaments in the bantamweight, heavyweight, and women's divisions. Zach Makovsky defeated Ed West at Bellator 32 to win the 135 lb tournament and become the promotions first ever Bellator Bantamweight Champion. Also that same evening, Cole Konrad submitted Neil Grove to win the heavyweight tournament and become the first Heavyweight Champion in Bellator history. Zoila Gurgel became the first Bellator Women's Champion when she defeated Megumi Fujii at Bellator 34. The first official title defense took place between defending Bellator Featherweight Champion Joe Soto and Season 2 Tournament Champion Joe Warren at Bellator 27. Warren defeated Soto by TKO to become the new Bellator Featherweight Champion. Other championship fights featured during season 3 were Hector Lombard retaining his Bellator middleweight championship by defeating Season 2 Tournament Winner, Alexander Shlemenko and Season 2 Welterweight Tournament Champion, Ben Askren, defeating reigning champion Lyman Good to become the new Bellator Welterweight Champion. Some of the memorable moments from Bellator's Season three are Eddie Alvarez's third-round TKO victory over UFC veteran Roger Huerta in a non-title match and Bellator Middleweight Champion Hector Lombard's 38-second knockout of Herbert Goodman at Bellator 24.

- Winners:

Weight division	Winner	Runner-up	Event
Heavyweight	Cole Konrad	Neil Grove	Bellator 32
Bantamweight	Zach Makovsky	Ed West	Bellator 32
Women's Strawweight (115 lb)	Zoila Gurgel	Megumi Fujii	Bellator 34

==== Season Four – The MTV2 Partnership ====
Bellator Fighting Championships: Season Four (March 5, 2011 – May 21, 2011)

Season Four of Bellator began broadcasting nationally on March 5, 2011, and marked the promotions departure from FOX Sports Net to MTV2. Season 4 showcased tournaments in the featherweight, lightweight, welterweight and light heavyweight divisions. Patricio "Pitbull" defeated Daniel Mason-Straus at Bellator 45 to become the Bellator Featherweight Tournament Champion while Christian M'Pumbu defeated Richard Hale (fighter) the same night to become the first Bellator Light Heavyweight Champion in history. Also, Michael Chandler became the Bellator Season 4 Lightweight Tournament Champion when he defeated Patricky "Pitbull" at Bellator 44 while Jay Hieron booked a welterweight title shot by defeating Rick Hawn in the Bellator Welterweight Tournament Championship at Bellator 43. Some of the memorable highlights from Bellator's fourth season include Ben Saunders earning a TKO victory over Matt Lee in his Bellator debut, Richard Hale's inverted triangle choke over Nik Fekete at Bellator 38, a flying knee knockout by Patricky "Pitbull" over Toby Imada at Bellator 39 and Hector Lombard's one punch knockout of Falaniko Vitale at Bellator 44. Hale and Pitbull were, respectively, nominated for the 2011 World MMA Awards submission of the year and knockout of the year.

- Winners:

Weight division	Winner	Runner-up	Event
Light Heavyweight	Christian M'Pumbu	Richard Hale	Bellator 45
Welterweight	Jay Hieron	Rick Hawn	Bellator 43
Lightweight	Michael Chandler	Patricky Freire	Bellator 44
Featherweight	Patricio Freire	Daniel Mason-Straus	Bellator 45

==== Summer Series 2011 ====
Bellator Fighting Championships: 2011 Summer Series (June 25, 2011 – August 27, 2011)

In the summer of 2011, Bellator introduced the Summer Series which would feature a featherweight tournament that would decide a challenger for reigning Bellator Featherweight Champion Joe Warren. Like Season 4, the Summer Series was broadcast nationally on MTV2. A total of three events were held during the Summer Series including Bellator 47 which took place at Casino Rama in Rama, Ontario, Canada. This event marked the first time Bellator held an event outside the United States. In the featherweight tournament, Pat Curran defeated Marlon Sandro with a highlight-reel head-kick knockout in the finals at Bellator 48 to become the Bellator Summer Series Featherweight Tournament Champion. In addition to the featherweight tournament, Bellator also hosted a number of featured bouts, including Cole Konrad's non-title win over Paul Buentello and Seth Petruzelli securing a knockout win over former UFC Heavyweight Champion Ricco Rodriguez at Bellator 48.

- Winner:

Weight division	Winner	Runner-up	Event
Featherweight	Pat Curran	Marlon Sandro	Bellator 48

==== Season Five: The Viacom Era ====
Bellator Fighting Championships: Season Five (September 10, 2011 – November 26, 2011)

Bellator's fifth season, which began on September 10, 2011, continued to air on MTV2 in the United States as well as in HD on Epix. Bellator Tournaments for Season Five featured the bantamweight, welterweight, middleweight and heavyweight divisions. Additionally, Bellator announced that the preliminary cards for each event would air on Spike.com as well as Bellator's Facebook page. In the tournament finals, Eduardo Dantas defeated Alexis Vila at Bellator 59 to become the Bellator Bantamweight Tournament Champion while Douglas Lima knocked out Ben Saunders at Bellator 57 to become the Bellator Welterweight Tournament Champion. Also, Alexander Shlemenko defeated Vitor Vianna at Bellator 57 to become the Bellator Middleweight Tournament Champion while the heavyweight final between Eric Prindle and Thiago Santos was ruled a no contest after an accidental groin kick left Prindle unable to continue. Santos failed to make weight for a scheduled rematch causing the bout to be cancelled, and Prindle to be awarded the tournament win by default. On October 26, 2011, Viacom, the parent company of MTV Networks, announced the purchase of a majority stake in Bellator. As part of the deal, Paramount Network, then known as Spike TV, began broadcasting Bellator live in 2013. On November 7, 2011, in an effort to expand to outside markets, Bellator announced a five-year partnership with FremantleMedia that would allow the company to position itself as one of the premier MMA organizations internationally. On November 19, 2011, at Bellator 58, the company hosted what was called the best fight in the promotion's early history. Bellator Lightweight Champion Eddie Alvarez fought Season 4 Lightweight Tournament Champion Michael Chandler in a back-and-forth affair. In the end, Chandler defeated Alvarez via fourth-round submission to become the new Bellator Lightweight Champion in a fight that several journalists called the fight of the year. Other memorable highlights from season five include Douglas Lima's knockout victory over Chris Lozano at Bellator 53, Eric Prindle's knockout win over Ron Sparks at Bellator 56, Vitor Vianna's knockout of Bryan Baker at Bellator 54 and a pair of knockout victories by Alexis Vila and Eduardo Dantas at Bellator 51.

- Winners:

Weight division	Winner	Runner-up	Event
Heavyweight	Eric Prindle	Thiago Santos	Bellator 62
Middleweight	Alexander Shlemenko	Vitor Vianna	Bellator 57
Welterweight	Douglas Lima	Ben Saunders	Bellator 57
Bantamweight	Eduardo Dantas	Alexis Vila	Bellator 59

==== Season Six ====
Bellator Fighting Championships: Season Six (March 9, 2012 – August 24, 2012)

Bellator's sixth season began on March 9, 2012, with Bellator 60, when Pat Curran captured the Bellator Featherweight Championship after beating champion Joe Warren. At Bellator 64, Ben Askren defended his Welterweight title against Douglas Lima by unanimous decision. At Bellator 65, Eduardo Dantas defeated then champion Zach Makovsky to become the new Bellator Bantamweight Champion. At Bellator 70, Cole Konrad took down Eric Prindle in the first round to defend his Bellator Heavyweight Championship.

- Winners:

Weight division	Winner	Runner-up	Event
Middleweight	Maiquel Falcão	Andreas Spang	Bellator 69
Welterweight	Karl Amoussou	Bryan Baker	Bellator 72
Lightweight	Rick Hawn	Brent Weedman	Bellator 70
Featherweight	Daniel Mason-Straus	Marlon Sandro	Bellator 68
Bantamweight	Marcos Galvao	Luis Nogueira	Bellator 73

==== Summer Series 2012 ====
Bellator Fighting Championships: 2012 Summer Series (June 22, 2012 – August 24, 2012)

In the summer of 2012, Bellator held its second Summer Series, which featured a Light Heavyweight tournament to determine a challenger for the reigning Bellator Light Heavyweight Champion, Christian M'Pumbu. The Summer Series began on June 22, 2012, and was broadcast nationally on MTV2, comprising three events in total. In the Light Heavyweight tournament, Attila Végh defeated Travis Wiuff by knockout in the finals at Bellator 73, becoming the 2012 Bellator Summer Series Light Heavyweight Tournament Champion.

In addition to the Light Heavyweight tournament, Bellator hosted several featured bouts, including a third fight between Marius Zaromskis and Waachiim Spiritwolf at Bellator 72. Bellator also concluded two Season Six tournaments, with Karl Amoussou defeating Bryan Baker at Bellator 72 to become the Season Six Welterweight Champion, and Marcos Galvao defeating Luis Nogueira at Bellator 73 to become the Season Six Bantamweight Champion. Pat Curran was scheduled to defend his Featherweight Championship against Patricio Friere, the Season Four Champion, at Bellator 73; however, he was forced to withdraw from the bout due to an injury sustained during training.

- Winner:

Weight division	Winner	Runner-up	Event
Light Heavyweight	Attila Végh	Travis Wiuff	Bellator 73

==== Season Seven ====
Bellator Fighting Championships: Season Seven (September 28, 2012 – December 14, 2012)

Bellator's seventh season began on September 28, 2012, with Bellator 74. The season showcased heavyweight, welterweight, lightweight and featherweight tournaments.

- Winners:

Weight division	Winner	Runner-up	Event
Heavyweight	Alexander Volkov	Richard Hale	Bellator 84
Welterweight	Andrey Koreshkov	Lyman Good	Bellator 82
Lightweight	Dave Jansen	Marcin Held	Bellator 93
Featherweight	Shahbulat Shamhalaev	Rad Martinez	Bellator 90

==== Season Eight ====
Bellator Fighting Championships: Season Eight (January 17, 2013 – April 4, 2013)

Bellator's eighth season began on January 17, 2013, at the Bren Events Center in Irvine, Calif. The event served as Bellator's premier on Spike TV. Season Eight included featherweight, lightweight, welterweight, middleweight and light heavyweight tournaments.

- Winners:

Weight division	Winner	Runner-up	Event
Light Heavyweight	Emanuel Newton	Mikhail Zayats	Bellator 94
Middleweight	Doug Marshall	Brett Cooper	Bellator 95
Welterweight	Douglas Lima	Ben Saunders	Bellator 100
Lightweight	David Rickels	Saad Awad	Bellator 94
Featherweight	Frodo Khasbulaev	Mike Richman	Bellator 95

==== Summer Series 2013 ====
Bellator MMA: 2013 Summer Series (June 19, 2013 – July 31, 2013)

Bellator's 2013 Summer Series began on June 19, 2013. All three of this season's tournaments were contested as four-man tournaments, as opposed to Bellator's standard eight-man tournament. The change in tournament size was necessary in order to hold multiple tournaments during the summer series' shortened season.

- Winners:

Weight division	Winner	Runner-up	Event
Heavyweight	Vitaly Minakov	Ryan Martinez	Bellator 97
Light Heavyweight	Muhammed Lawal	Jacob Noe	Bellator 97
Bantamweight	Rafael Silva	Anthony Leone	Bellator 102

==== Season Nine ====
Bellator MMA: Season Nine (September 7, 2013 – November 22, 2013)

Bellator's Ninth season began on September 7, 2013. For this season the bantamweight and heavyweight tournaments were held as four-man tournaments, while all tournaments were the standard Bellator eight-man tournament.

- Winners:

Weight division	Winner	Runner-up	Event
Heavyweight (Note: Four-man tournament)	Cheick Kongo	Peter Graham	Bellator 107
Middleweight	Brennan Ward	Mikkel Parlo	Bellator 107
Welterweight	Rick Hawn	Ron Keslar	Bellator 109
Lightweight	Will Brooks	Alexander Sarnavskiy	Bellator 109
Featherweight	Patricio Freire	Justin Wilcox	Bellator 108
Bantamweight	Joe Warren	Travis Marx	Bellator 107

==== Season Ten ====
Bellator MMA: Season Ten (February 28, 2014 – May 17, 2014)

Bellator's Tenth season began on February 28, 2014. For this season the middleweight and light heavyweight tournaments were held as four-man tournaments, while all tournaments were the standard Bellator eight-man tournament.

Weight division	Winner	Runner-up	Event
Heavyweight	Alexander Volkov	Blagoy Ivanov	Bellator 120
Light Heavyweight	Quinton Jackson	Muhammed Lawal	Bellator 120
Featherweight	Daniel Weichel	Desmond Green	Bellator 119
Middleweight	Brandon Halsey	Brett Cooper	Bellator 122
Welterweight	Andrey Koreshkov	Adam McDonough	Bellator 122
Lightweight	Marcin Held	Patricky Freire	Bellator 126

==== Summer Series 2014 ====
Bellator MMA: 2014 Summer Series (June 6, 2014 – July 25, 2014)

Bellator's 2014 Summer Series began on June 6, 2014. The 2014 Summer Series featured an eight-man light heavyweight tournament and a series of Season 10 tournament finals.

Weight division	Winner	Runner-up	Event
Light heavyweight	Liam McGeary	Kelly Anundson	Bellator 124

==== Season Eleven ====
Bellator MMA: Season Eleven (September 5, 2014 – November 15, 2014)

This was Bellator's final tournament season, as well as the last to be overseen by former CEO & Chairman Bjorn Rebney.

== Videogame ==
Bellator: MMA Onslaught is an MMA fighting game released exclusively in the United States as a budget title for PS3 and Xbox 360 on July 3, 2012, and Xbox One on November 12, 2015. Each version was developed by Kung Fu Factory with the PS3 version published by New 38th Floor Productions and the Xbox versions published by 345 Games. Only eight fighters are featured across only two weight divisions; featherweight and lightweight consisting of Michael Chandler, Marlon Sandro, Pat Curran, Joe Warren, The "Pitbull" Brothers Patricky and Patrício Freire, Daniel Straus, and Ronnie Mann. The game features the standard One-vs-One, tournament, online, and Create-A-Fighter modes. This was the company's only videogame release and it received 'poor to average' reviews.

== See also ==
- Bellator Kickboxing
- List of Bellator MMA events
- List of Bellator MMA champions
- List of current Bellator MMA fighters
- List of Bellator MMA alumni
