= 2011 in Tachi Palace Fights =

Mixed martial arts events

Information
- First date: February 18, 2011
- Last date: December 2, 2011

Events
- Total events: 4

Fights
- Total fights: 44
- Title fights: 6

Chronology
2010 in Tachi Palace Fights	2011 in Tachi Palace Fights	2012 in Tachi Palace Fights

The year 2011 is the third year in the history of Tachi Palace Fights, a mixed martial arts promotion based in The United States. In 2011 Tachi Palace Fights held 4 events beginning with, TPF 8: All or Nothing.

== Title fights ==
Title fights in 2011
Weight class				Method	Round	Time	Event	Notes
PF Middleweight	David Loiseau	def	Leopoldo Serao (c)	TKO (doctor stoppage)	5	1:12	TPF 8: All or Nothing	(Note: For the Tachi Palace Fights Middleweight Championship.)
PF Flyweight	Darrell Montague	def	Ulysses Gomez (c)	unanimous decision (50-45, 50-45, 50-45)	3	5:00	TPF 8: All or Nothing	(Note: For the Tachi Palace Fights Flyweight Championship.)
Flyweight	Ian McCall	def	Darrell Montague (c)	submission (rear naked choke)	3	2:15	TPF 10: Let The Chips Fall	(Note: For the Tachi Palace Fights Flyweight Championship.)
Featherweight	Eddie Yagin	def	Joe Soto	submission (guillotine choke)	1	2:00	TPF 10: Let The Chips Fall	(Note: For the Tachi Palace Fights Featherweight Championship.)
Featherweight	Georgi Karakhanyan	def.	Isaac DeJesus	Submission (Triangle Choke)	1	4:02	TPF 11: Redemption	(Note: For the Tachi Palace Fights Featherweight Championship.)
Bantamweight	Ulysses Gomez	def.	Cody Gibson	Submission (Guillotine Choke)	3	2:43	TPF 11: Redemption	(Note: For the Tachi Palace Fights Bantamweight Championship.)

== Events list ==
#	Event title	Date	Arena	Location
12	TPF 11: Redemption	December 2, 2011	Tachi Palace	Lemoore, California
11	TPF 10: Let The Chips Fall	August 5, 2011	Tachi Palace	Lemoore, California
10	TPF 9: The Contenders	May 6, 2011	Tachi Palace	Lemoore, California
9	TPF 8: All or Nothing	February 18, 2011	Tachi Palace	Lemoore, California

== TPF 8: All or Nothing ==
TPF 8: All or Nothing was an event held on February 18, 2011 at the Tachi Palace in Lemoore, California.

=== Results ===
Main card
Weight class				Method	Round	Time	Notes
PF Middleweight	David Loiseau	def	Leopoldo Serao (c)	TKO (doctor stoppage)	5	1:12	(Note: For the Tachi Palace Fights Middleweight Championship.)
PF Flyweight	Darrell Montague	def	Ulysses Gomez (c)	unanimous decision (50-45, 50-45, 50-45)	3	5:00	(Note: For the Tachi Palace Fights Flyweight Championship.)
Flyweight	Ian McCall	def	Jussier Formiga	unanimous decision (29-28, 29-28, 29-28)	3	5:00
Middleweight	Edgar Garcia	def	Mike Moreno	submission (guillotine choke)	1	1:47
Catchweight (156 lbs)	Dominique Robinson	def	John Gunderson	TKO (punches and elbows)	3	0:41
Lightweight	Fabricio Camoes	def	Steve Lopez	KO (head kick and punches)	1	0:23
Lightweight	Doug Hunt	def	Andrew Martinez	TKO (punches)	1	4:27
Lightweight	Andy Miranda	def	Ryan Burton	technical submission (triangle choke)	1	1:06
Middleweight	Collin Hart	def	Mike Arellano	submission (rear-naked choke)	1	1:32
Featherweight	Tyler Freeland	def	Diego Melendez	unanimous decision (30-27, 29-28, 29-28)	3	5:00
Middleweight	Alan Jouban	def	Kyle Griffin	KO (knee)	1	0:15

== TPF 9: The Contenders ==
TPF 9: The Contenders was an event held on May 6, 2011 at the Tachi Palace in Lemoore, California.

=== Results ===
Main Card
Weight class				Method	Round	Time	Notes
Flyweight	Ian Mccall	def.	Dustin Ortiz	Decision (Unanimous)	3	5:00
Featherweight	Isaac DeJesus	vs.	Russ Miura	NC (Overturned by CSAC)	1	2:52
Lightweight	Fabricio Camoes	def.	Efraín Escudero	Decision (Unanimous)	3	5:00
Middleweight	Gerald Harris	def.	Anthony Ruiz	Decision (Unanimous)	3	5:00
Flyweight	Mamoru Yamaguchi	def.	Kevin Dunsmoor	KO (Punch)	2	4:03
Middleweight	Jorge Lopez	def.	Waachiim Spiritwolf	Decision (Unanimous)	3	5:00
Bantamweight	Farkhad Sharipov	def.	Tommy Vargas	Decision (Unanimous)	3	5:00
Welterweight	Chidi Njokuani	def.	Alan Jouban	KO (Kick to the Body)	3	1:27
Lightweight	Art Arciniega	def.	Josh Herrick	Submission (Triangle Choke)	1	1:08
Bantamweight	Cody Gibson	def.	Walel Watson	TKO (Punches and Elbows)	2	4:09
Featherweight	Brad McDonald	def.	Jesse Bowen	Decision (Split)	3	3:00
Welterweight	Kenny Ento	def.	James Chaney	TKO (Doctor Stoppage)	2	1:53
Lightweight	Alex Perez	def.	Jesus Castro	TKO (Punches)	1	1:56

== TPF 10: Let The Chips Fall ==
TPF 10: Let The Chips Fall was an event held on August 5, 2011 at the Tachi Palace in Lemoore, California.

=== Results ===
Main card
Weight class				Method	Round	Time	Notes
Flyweight	Ian McCall	def	Darrell Montague (c)	submission (rear naked choke)	3	2:15	(Note: For the Tachi Palace Fights Flyweight Championship.)
Featherweight	Eddie Yagin	def	Joe Soto	submission (guillotine choke)	1	2:00	(Note: For the Tachi Palace Fights Featherweight Championship.)
Flyweight	Jussier Formiga	def	Mamoru Yamaguchi	unanimous decision (30-27, 30-27, 30-27)	3	5:00
Middleweight	Giva Santana	def	Doug Marshall	submission (rear naked choke)	1	0:29
Welterweight	Jorge Lopez	def	David Marshall	TKO (retirement)	2	5:00
Bantamweight	Ulysses Gomez	def	Drew Bittner	submission (rear naked choke)	2	1:21
Catchweight (174 lb)	Kenny Ento	def	Phil Collins	KO (punches)	1	1:46
Featherweight	Brad McDonald	def	Sergio Quinones	submission (armbar)	1	3:36
Catchweight (150 lb)	Musa Toliver	def	Andy Miranda	unanimous decision (30-27, 30-27, 30-27)	3	5:00

== TPF 11: Redemption ==
TPF 11: Redemption was an event held on December 2, 2011 at the Tachi Palace in Lemoore, California.

=== Results ===
Main Card
Weight class				Method	Round	Time	Notes
Featherweight	Georgi Karakhanyan	def.	Isaac DeJesus	Submission (Triangle Choke)	1	4:02	(Note: For the Tachi Palace Fights Featherweight Championship.)
Bantamweight	Ulysses Gomez	def.	Cody Gibson	Submission (Guillotine Choke)	3	2:43	(Note: For the Tachi Palace Fights Bantamweight Championship.)
	Dustin Ortiz	def.	Josh Rave	TKO (Doctor Stoppage)	3	4:38
	Phil Collins	def.	Andrew Martinez	Submission (Guillotine Choke)	1	0:49
	Francisco Rivera	def.	Brad McDonald	KO (Punches)	1	0:40
	Savant Young	def.	Robert Washington	Submission (Guillotine Choke)	2	2:41
	Bubba Jenkins	def.	Josh Williams	Submission (Punches)	1	2:04
	Anthony Figueroa	def.	Paul Ruiz	Decision (Unanimous)	3	5:00
	Jesse Bowen	def.	Sergio Quinones	Decision (Unanimous)	3	5:00
	Edgar Diaz	def.	Alex Perez	Submission (Guillotine Choke)	1	0:43
	Javy Ayala	def.	Freddie Aquitania	Decision (Split)	3	5:00
