= Givanildo =

Givanildo is a given name. It may refer to:

- Givanildo Oliveira (born 1948), Brazilian former footballer and manager
- Givanildo Vieira de Souza (born 1986), commonly known as Hulk, Brazilian footballer
- Givanildo Santana do Nascimento, known as Giva Santana, Brazilian mixed martial artist
- Givanildo Pulgas da Silva (born 1993), known as Giva, Brazilian footballer
