= Ricky Legere =

American mixed martial arts fighter (born 1985)

Ricky Legere Jr
- Born: Richard Legere Jr; December 21, 1985 (age 40); Norco, California, U.S.
- Other names: The IE Bad Boy
- Height: 5 ft 8 in (1.73 m)
- Weight: 171 lb (78 kg; 12.2 st)
- Division: Middleweight; Welterweight
- Reach: 73.0 in (185 cm)
- Fighting out of: Corona, California, U.S.
- Team: MMA; Millennia MMA
- Years active: 2007–present

Mixed martial arts record
- Total: 26
- Wins: 19
- By knockout: 8
- By submission: 9
- By decision: 2
- Losses: 7
- By knockout: 3
- By submission: 2
- By decision: 2

Ricky Legere (born December 21, 1985) is a retired American professional mixed martial artist. A professional competitor from 2007 until 2015, Legere has formerly competed for Bellator MMA, Strikeforce, the RFA, King of the Cage, and Tachi Palace Fights.

== Background ==
Legere is from Norco, California, attending Norco High School where he was a three-sport athlete and a CIF wrestling placer.

== Mixed martial arts career ==
=== King of the Cage ===
Legere made his professional mixed martial arts debut in 2007 for King of the Cage. He would go on to win his first six professional fights, with the first four ending in the first round, before facing future Strikeforce and Bellator veteran Waachiim Spiritwolf. Legere was handed his first professional loss at the hands of Spiritwolf, losing via knockout in the second round.

Legere then faced future King of the Cage Welterweight Champion, as well as future Strikeforce and UFC veteran, Quinn Mulhern. Legere was handed his second consecutive loss via triangle-choke submission in the second round. After bouncing back with two consecutive knockout wins, Legere fought Waachiim Spiritwolf in a rematch for the newly vacated King of the Cage Junior Welterweight Championship. Legere won via TKO in the second round and then defended his title three months later before losing it to future Strikeforce and UFC veteran, Bobby Green.

After another loss at the hands of WEC and Strikeforce veteran Adam Lynn, Legere won his next three fights all in the first round, before being signed by Strikeforce.

=== Strikeforce ===
Legere made his Strikeforce debut at Strikeforce: Rockhold vs. Jardine on January 7, 2012, facing off against future UFC fighter Chris Spang. Legere won the bout via unanimous decision.

=== Bellator ===
After his first and only fight with Strikeforce, Legere won another bout before being signed by the Bellator Fighting Championships, making his debut for the organization at Bellator 92, facing former Strikeforce fighter Sabah Homasi. Legere won the bout via rear-naked choke submission at 2:52 of the second round.

After the win over Homasi in Bellator, Legere has gone 3–2.

== Mixed martial arts record ==
Professional record breakdown
26 matches	19 wins	7 losses
By knockout	8	3
By submission	9	2
By decision	2	2

Res.	Record	Opponent	Method	Event	Date	Round	Time	Location	Notes
Loss	19–7	J.J. Ambrose	Submission (guillotine choke)	KOTC: Bitter Rivals	August 29, 2015	1	1:36	Ontario, California, United States	
Loss	19–6	Max Griffin	KO (punch)	TPF 21: All or Nothing	November 6, 2014	1	3:21	Lemoore, California, United States	Lost the TPF Welterweight Championship.
Win	19–5	Nate Loughran	Submission (rear-naked choke)	TPF 20: Night of Champions	August 7, 2014	3	2:51	Lemoore, California, United States	Won the vacant TPF Welterweight Championship.
Loss	18–5	Alan Jouban	Decision (split)	RFA 15: Casey vs. Sanchez	June 6, 2014	3	5:00	Culver City, California, United States	
Win	18–4	Joey Cabezas	Submission (armbar)	TPF 16: Martinez vs. Giagos	August 22, 2013	1	2:22	Lemoore, California, United States	
Win	17–4	James Chaney	TKO (punches)	Flawless FC 3: California Love	May 18, 2013	3	1:00	Inglewood, California, United States	
Win	16–4	Sabah Homasi	Submission (rear-naked choke)	Bellator 92	March 7, 2013	2	2:52	Temecula, California, United States	
Win	15–4	Steve Van Vilet	Submission (rear-naked choke)	Gladiator Challenge: Heat Returns	October 28, 2012	1	0:45	San Jacinto, California, United States	
Win	14–4	Chris Spang	Decision (unanimous)	Strikeforce: Rockhold vs. Jardine	January 7, 2012	3	5:00	Las Vegas, Nevada, United States	
Win	13–4	Rafael Ledezma	TKO (ankle injury)	Gladiator Challenge: Full Force	June 12, 2011	1	0:09	San Jacinto, California, United States	
Win	12–4	Koa Ramos	Submission (heel hook)	KOTC: Sniper	August 5, 2010	1	1:47	San Bernardino, California, United States	
Win	11–4	Joe Lewis	Submission (rear-naked choke)	KOTC: Tropical Storm	July 10, 2010	1	4:10	Lake Elsinore, California, United States	
Loss	10–4	Adam Lynn	Decision (majority)	KOTC: Excessive Damage	May 13, 2010	3	5:00	Highland, California, United States	
Loss	10–3	Bobby Green	TKO (punches)	KOTC: Arrival	February 25, 2010	1	4:27	Highland, California, United States	Lost the KOTC Light Welterweight Championship.
Win	10–2	Eric Moon	Submission (armbar)	KOTC: Fight 4 Hope	December 17, 2009	1	3:04	Highland, California, United States	Defended the KOTC Light Welterweight Championship.
Win	9–2	Waachiim Spiritwolf	TKO (punches)	KOTC: Distorted	October 1, 2009	2	2:25	Highland, California, United States	Won the vacant KOTC Light Welterweight Championship.
Win	8–2	Mike Robles	TKO (punches)	KOTC: Militia	June 11, 2009	3	2:12	Highland, California, United States	
Win	7–2	Erik Meaders	KO (punches)	KOTC: Storm	May 16, 2009	1	2:20	Lake Elsinore, California, United States	
Loss	6–2	Quinn Mulhern	Submission (triangle choke)	KOTC: New Breed	March 7, 2009	2	2:52	Mescalero, New Mexico, United States	
Loss	6–1	Waachiim Spiritwolf	KO (punch)	KOTC: Prowler	December 11, 2008	2	0:16	Highland, California, United States	
Win	6–0	James Fanshier	Decision (unanimous)	KOTC: Misconduct	October 16, 2008	3	5:00	Highland, California, United States	
Win	5–0	Daniel Hernandez	Submission (rear-naked choke)	KOTC: Bio Hazard	August 14, 2008	2	2:01	Highland, California, United States	Middleweight bout.
Win	4–0	Gabe Lara	TKO	KOTC: Tsunami 2	March 27, 2008	1	1:09	Highland, California, United States	
Win	3–0	Fortino Sanchez	KO (punches)	KOTC: Premiere	January 24, 2008	1	0:56	Highland, California, United States	
Win	2–0	Napoleon Lechuga	Submission (armbar)	KOTC: Final Chapter	December 2, 2007	1	3:31	San Jacinto, California, United States	Welterweight debut.
Win	1–0	Robert Doucet	TKO (punches)	KOTC: Point of No Return	October 7, 2007	1	0:46	San Jacinto, California, United States	
