= 2008 in Palace Fighting Championship =

Information
- First date: January 17, 2008
- Last date: November 20, 2008

Events
- Total events: 10

Fights
- Total fights: 104

Chronology
2007 in PFC	2008 in Palace Fighting Championship	2009 in PFC

The year 2008 is the 2nd year in the history of Palace Fighting Championship, a mixed martial arts promotion based in the United States. In 2008 PFC held 10 events beginning with, PFC 6: No Retreat, No Surrender.

== Events list ==
No.	Event	Date	Venue	Location
15	PFC 11: All In	November 20, 2008	Tachi Palace	Lemoore, California
14	PFC: Martinez vs. Lorenz	October 23, 2008	Tachi Palace	Lemoore, California
13	PFC 10: Explosive	September 26, 2008	Tachi Palace	Lemoore, California
12	PFC: Bias vs. Blood	August 21, 2008	Tachi Palace	Lemoore, California
11	PFC 9: The Return	July 7, 2008	Tachi Palace	Lemoore, California
10	PFC 8: A Night of Champions	May 8, 2008	Tachi Palace	Lemoore, California
9	PFC 7.5: New Blood	April 26, 2008	Eagle Mountain Casino	Porterville, California
8	PFC 7: Palace Fighting Championship 7	March 20, 2008	Tachi Palace	Lemoore, California
7	PFC: Olson vs. Alfonso	February 29, 2008	Tachi Palace	Lemoore, California
6	PFC 6: No Retreat, No Surrender	January 17, 2008	Tachi Palace	Lemoore, California

== PFC 6: No Retreat, No Surrender ==
PFC 6: No Retreat, No Surrender was an event held on January 17, 2008 at the Tachi Palace in Lemoore, California, United States.

=== Results ===
Main Card
Weight class				Method	Round	Time	Notes
	Diego Saraiva	def.	Poppies Martinez	Submission (Rear-Naked Choke)	1	2:08
	Art Arciniega	def.	Shawn Bias	Submission (Triangle Choke)	4	2:07
	Rolando Velasco	def.	Shawn Klarcyk	TKO (Punches)	4	1:46
	Anthony Ruiz	def.	Brad Imes	Decision (Split)	3	3:00
	Glover Teixeira	def.	Jorge Oliveira	KO (Punches)	1	0:05
	Scott Lighty	def.	Derek Thornton	Submission (Verbal)	1	2:33
	Nate Loughran	def.	Richard Montoya	Submission (Armbar)	2	0:38
	Joseph Benavidez	def.	Jason Georgianna	Submission (Guillotine Choke)	2	0:38
	Ricardo Barros	def.	Eric Pribble	Submission (Rear-Naked Choke)	1	1:20
	Alex Serdyukov	def.	Mike Gates	TKO (Punches)	2	2:05
	Casey Olson	def.	Scott Brommage	TKO (Punches)	1	1:48
	Doug Hunt	def.	Andrew Martinez	TKO (Doctor Stoppage)	2	2:04
	Tony Alanis	def.	Tom Owens	TKO (Punches)	1	2:58
	Jocquin Sanchez	def.	Austin Achorn	Submission (Injury)	1	0:20
	Sergio Quinones	def.	Fernando Arreola	Decision (Split)	3	3:00
	Brandon Miller	def.	Ed Tomaselli	TKO (Punches)	1	2:27

== PFC: Olson vs. Alfonso ==
PFC: Olson vs. Alfonso was an event held on February 29, 2008 at the Tachi Palace in Lemoore, California, United States.

=== Results ===
Main Card
Weight class				Method	Round	Time	Notes
	Olaf Alfonso	def.	Casey Olson	KO (Punch)	2	1:50

== PFC 7: Palace Fighting Championship 7 ==
PFC 7: Palace Fighting Championship 7 was an event held on March 20, 2008 at the Tachi Palace in Lemoore, California, United States.

=== Results ===
Main Card
Weight class				Method	Round	Time	Notes
	Jorge Oliveira	def.	Jeremy Freitag	Decision (Unanimous)	5	3:00
	Glover Teixeira	def.	Buckley Acosta	TKO (Punches)	1	1:00
	Jorge Evangelista	def.	Enoch Wilson	Decision (Split)	3	3:00
	Phil Collins	def.	Mike Martinez	Submission (Heel Hook)	1	1:16
	Ulysses Gomez	def.	Greg McDowell	Submission (Choke)	1	0:41
	Jeremiah Metcalf	def.	Jimmy Dexter	Submission (Rear-Naked Choke)	2	1:47
	David Mitchell	def.	Daniel Pinedo	Submission (Rear-Naked Choke)	1	2:07
	Rafael del Real	def.	Carlton Jones	Decision (Split)	3	3:00
	Bryan Travers	def.	Joel Crawford	Submission (Kimura)	1	2:50
	Danny Castillo	def.	Andy Salazar	Submission (Punches)	1	1:02
	Brandon Jinnies	def.	Robert Breslin	Decision (Unanimous)	3	3:00

== PFC 7.5: New Blood ==
PFC 7.5: New Blood was an event held on April 26, 2008 at the Eagle Mountain Casino in Porterville, California, United States.

=== Results ===
Main Card
Weight class				Method	Round	Time	Notes
	Sergio Quinones	def.	Albert Tisdale	Submission	1	2:07
	Morris Aldaco	def.	Chris Botelho	Decision (Unanimous)	3	3:00
	Manuel Quezada	def.	Chayondray Johnson	KO (Punch)	1	1:17
	Poppies Martinez	def.	Jarod Saenz	Submission (Guillotine Choke)	1	0:31
	George Albanez	def.	Anthony Vera	Submission	1	2:21
	Joey Cabezas	def.	Moses Lira	KO (Punch)	1	0:06
	Rico Altamirano	def.	Anthony Bivins	Decision (Unanimous)	3	3:00
	Sal Farnetti	def.	Zane Johnson	TKO (Punches)	1	0:23
	Bill Theofanopoulos	def.	Juan Lopez	Submission	1	0:29
	Joe Morales	def.	Andy Salazar	Decision (Unanimous)	3	3:00
	Chuck Kim	def.	Brandon Jinnies	Submission	2	1:38
	Tito Jones	def.	Fernando Arreola	KO (Punch)	1	0:31
	Anthony Perales	def.	Martin Sandoval	TKO (Punches)	2	1:15
	Dale Redday	def.	Alex del Real	Submission	1	0:38

== PFC 8: A Night of Champions ==
PFC 8: A Night of Champions was an event held on May 8, 2008 at the Tachi Palace in Lemoore, California, United States.

=== Results ===
Main Card
Weight class				Method	Round	Time	Notes
	Brian Cobb	def.	Diego Saraiva	Decision (Unanimous)	5	3:00
	Sergio Cortez	def.	Poppies Martinez	TKO (Injury)	1	2:57
	Devin Cole	def.	Vince Lucero	TKO (Punches)	1	1:17
	Olaf Alfonso	def.	Chris Solomon	KO (Punch)	1	0:28
	Jorge Evangelista	def.	Art Arciniega	Decision (Unanimous)	5	3:00
	Nate Loughran	def.	Kenny Ento	Submission (Rear-Naked Choke)	2	2:30
	Casey Olson	def.	Sergio Quinones	Submission (Rear-Naked Choke)	1	0:46
	Dustin Akbari	def.	Cody Canterbury	TKO (Punches)	1	1:37
	Lodune Sincaid	def.	Rafael del Real	Submission (Guillotine Choke)	1	1:03
	Shawn Klarcyk	def.	Jason Georgianna	Submission (Kneebar)	2	0:57
	Joseph Benavidez	def.	Maurice Eazel	Submission (Rear-Naked Choke)	1	1:02
	Dan Russom	def.	Thonglor Armatsena	Decision (Majority)	3	3:00

== PFC 9: The Return ==
PFC 9: The Return was an event held on July 7, 2008 at the Tachi Palace in Lemoore, California, United States.

=== Results ===
Main Card
Weight class				Method	Round	Time	Notes
	Jorge Oliveira	vs.	Isaiah Larson	No Contest	3	0:00
	Casey Olson	def.	Tito Jones	Decision (Unanimous)	3	3:00
	Joe Soto	def.	Darren Crisp	Submission (Kneebar)	1	1:08
	Jaime Jara	def.	Marcus Gaines	Submission (Guillotine Choke)	1	1:54
	Juan Lopez	def.	Jeremy Luchau	Submission (Rear Naked Choke)	2	0:33
	Dominique Robinson	def.	Chuck Kim	TKO	2	2:00
	Doug Marshall	def.	Phil Collins	TKO (Punches)	2	0:40
	Ulysses Gomez	def.	Hector Sandoval	Submission (Armbar)	1	0:51
	Andrew Martinez	def.	Chrayondray Johnson	TKO (Punches)	1	1:31
	Paul Gonzalez	def.	Alfredo Mireles	Submission (Rear Naked Choke)	1	1:51
	Alex Ortiz	def.	Javier Cervantes	TKO (Punches)	2	0:58

== PFC: Bias vs. Blood ==
PFC: Bias vs. Blood was an event held on August 21, 2008 at the Tachi Palace in Lemoore, California, United States.

=== Results ===
Main Card
Weight class				Method	Round	Time	Notes
	Shawn Bias	def.	Marcus Blood	TKO (Punches)	1	2:58
	Tito Jones	def.	Hussain Rasouli	Submission (Rear Naked Choke)	1	2:02
	Lavar Johnson	def.	Sal Farnetti	TKO (Punches)	1	2:14
	Rocky Molina	def.	James Rodriguez	Decision (Unanimous)	3	3:00

== PFC 10: Explosive ==
PFC 10: Explosive was an event held on September 26, 2008 at the Tachi Palace in Lemoore, California, United States.

=== Results ===
Main Card
Weight class				Method	Round	Time	Notes
	Phil Baroni	def.	Olaf Alfonso	Decision (Unanimous)	3	3:00
	Bryan Travers	def.	Jeremiah Metcalf	Decision (Unanimous)	5	3:00
	Shawn Klarcyk	def.	Brandon Miller	Technical Submission (Armbar)	2	2:19
	Brian Cobb	def.	David Gardner	Decision (Unanimous)	5	3:00
	Joe Soto	def.	Brandon Jinnies	TKO (Punches)	1	0:59
	Antonio Banuelos	def.	Bryan Goldsby	KO (Punch)	2	0:59
	Lavar Johnson	def.	Vince Lucero	KO (Punch)	1	1:16
	David Suarez	def.	David Mitchell	KO (Slam)	1	1:15
	Xavier Foupa-Pokam	def.	Richard Montoya	Submission (Armbar)	1	1:13
	Poppies Martinez	def.	Sergio Cortez	Decision (Unanimous)	3	3:00
	Dustin Akbari	def.	Bill Theofanopoulos	TKO (Punches)	1	1:35
	Chad Mendes	def.	Giovanni Encarnacion	Submission (Rear-Naked Choke)	1	2:06
	Luis Gonzalez	def.	Elbert Randle	TKO (Punches)	1	2:24
	Joey Cabezas	def.	Billy Terry	TKO (Punches)	1	0:54
	Raul Sandoval	def.	Mike Craddock	Decision (Unanimous)	3	3:00
	Chris Botelho	def.	Anthony Bivins	Decision (Majority)	3	3:00

== PFC: Martinez vs. Lorenz ==
PFC: Martinez vs. Lorenz was an event held on October 23, 2008 at the Tachi Palace in Lemoore, California, United States.

=== Results ===
Main Card
Weight class				Method	Round	Time	Notes
	Mike Martinez	def.	Brandon Lorenze	Submission (Armbar)	1	0:50
	Jorge Evangelista	def.	Randy Spence	Decision (Unanimous)	3	3:00
	Jeff Terry	def.	Jocquin Sanchez	Submission (Triangle Choke)	1	0:57
	Jimmy Jarquin	def.	Anthony Acosta	Submission (Rear Naked Choke)	2	2:07
	Fernando Arreola	def.	Sergio Quinones	Decision (Unanimous)	3	3:00

== PFC 11: All In ==
PFC 11: All In was an event held on November 20, 2008 at the Tachi Palace in Lemoore, California, United States.

=== Results ===
Main Card
Weight class				Method	Round	Time	Notes
	Doug Marshall	def.	Rafael Del Real	TKO (Punches)	1	1:09
	Jorge Oliveira	def.	Isaiah Larson	Submission (Armbar)	3	2:18
	Rambaa Somdet	def.	Ulysses Gomez	Decision (Unanimous)	3	3:00
	Leopoldo Serao	def.	Jaime Jara	Decision (Unanimous)	3	3:00
	Dominique Robinson	def.	Takumi Nakayama	Decision (Unanimous)	3	3:00
	Eddie Yagin	def.	Shawn Bias	Submission (Guillotine Choke)	3	0:37
	Poppies Martinez	def.	Tony Llamas	Submission (Armbar)	1	1:51
	Erin Toughill	def.	Jan Finney	Decision (Unanimous)	3	3:00
	Pat Runez	def.	Luis Gonzalez	Decision (Unanimous)	3	3:00
	Phil Collins	def.	Kenny Ento	Decision (Unanimous)	3	3:00
	Darren Crisp	def.	Andrew Martinez	TKO (Front Kick and Punches)	2	0:22
	Paulina Ramirez	def.	Brittany Briano	Decision (Unanimous)	3	3:00
	Scott McAfee	def.	Jason Drake	TKO (Punches)	1	2:02
	Jason Carpenter	def.	Juan Lopez	Submission (Rear Naked Choke)	1	0:43

== See also ==
- Palace Fighting Championship
