= Nate Loughran =

American mixed martial arts fighter

- Born: Nathaniel James Loughran; Rohnert Park, California, United States
- Nationality: American
- Height: 6 ft 2 in (1.88 m)
- Weight: 170 lb (77 kg; 12 st)
- Division: Middleweight; Welterweight
- Fighting out of: Santa Rosa, California, United States
- Team: NorCal Fighting Alliance
- Years active: 2006–present

Mixed martial arts record
- Total: 13
- Wins: 11
- By knockout: 1
- By submission: 8
- By decision: 2
- Losses: 2
- By knockout: 1
- By submission: 1

Amateur record
- Total: 2
- Wins: 2
- By knockout: 1
- By submission: 1
- Losses: 0

Other information
- Mixed martial arts record from Sherdog

Nathaniel James Loughran is an American mixed martial artist. Loughran was formerly signed to the Ultimate Fighting Championship, and currently competes for Tachi Palace Fights.

== Mixed martial arts career ==
=== Amateur mixed martial arts career ===
Loughran is 2–0 in his amateur MMA career, with his first fight taking place on October 27, 2007, as he defeated Shawn Ady via arm-triangle at Hard Knocks Cage Fights 1. Then on May 17, 2008, Loughran defeated Ed Mouse via TKO at COC 2: Overthrow.

=== Ultimate Fighting Championship ===
Loughran's first UFC fight was against Johnny Rees at UFC Fight Night: Silva vs. Irvin, where he won by submission in the first round.

Loughran lost his second UFC fight against Tim Credeur at UFC: Fight for the Troops via TKO (injury) in the third round. After his loss to Credeur he asked to be released from the UFC.

In late 2013, Loughran was re-signed by the promotion and was expected to face Erick Silva on February 15, 2014, at UFC Fight Night 36. However, Loughran was forced out of the bout due to injury. Due to more training injuries, Loughran was once again released from the promotion and re-signed with Tachi Palace Fights.

== Championships and accomplishments ==
- Tachi Palace Fights
  - TPF Welterweight Championship (One time)

== Mixed martial arts record ==
Professional record breakdown
13 matches	11 wins	2 losses
By knockout	1	1
By submission	8	1
By decision	2	0

Res.	Record	Opponent	Method	Event	Date	Round	Time	Location	Notes
Loss	11–2	Ricky Legere	Submission (rear-naked choke)	TPF 20: Night of Champions	August 7, 2014	3	2:51	Lemoore, California, United States	Lost the TPF Welterweight Championship.
Win	11–1	Kito Andrews	Decision (unanimous)	TPF 17: Fall Brawl	November 14, 2013	5	5:00	Lemoore, California, United States	Welterweight debut; won the TPF Welterweight Championship.
Win	10–1	Jaime Jara	Decision (split)	CCFC: The Return	March 3, 2012	3	5:00	Santa Rosa, California, United States	
Loss	9–1	Tim Credeur	TKO (injury)	UFC: Fight for the Troops	December 10, 2008	2	5:00	Fayetteville, North Carolina, United States	
Win	9–0	Johnny Rees	Submission (triangle choke)	UFC Fight Night: Silva vs. Irvin	July 19, 2008	1	4:21	Las Vegas, Nevada, United States	
Win	8–0	Kenny Ento	Submission (rear-naked choke)	PFC 8: A Night of Champions	May 8, 2008	2	2:30	Lemoore, California, United States	
Win	7–0	Richard Montoya	Submission (armbar)	PFC 6: No Retreat, No Surrender	January 17, 2008	2	0:38	Lemoore, California, United States	
Win	6–0	Brian Warren	Submission (rear-naked choke)	PFC 4: Project Complete	October 18, 2007	1	2:39	Lemoore, California, United States	
Win	5–0	Phil Collins	Submission (triangle choke)	CCFC: Judgment Day	February 17, 2007	1	0:41	Santa Rosa, California, United States	
Win	4–0	Robert Sarkozi	Submission (triangle choke)	GC 57: Holiday Beatings	December 16, 2006	1	3:28	Sacramento, California, United States	
Win	3–0	Bryan Travers	Submission (triangle choke)	GC 55: Beatdown	October 14, 2006	1	1:42	Lakeport, California, United States	
Win	2–0	Brandon Colvin	TKO (strikes)	GC 52: Deep Impact	July 8, 2006	1	1:12	Lakeport, California, United States	
Win	1–0	Erik Hayes	Submission (armbar)	GC 49: Face Off	April 8, 2006	1	0:20	Lakeport, California, United States	

== Amateur mixed martial arts record ==
Professional record breakdown
2 matches	2 wins	0 losses
By knockout	1	0
By submission	1	0
By decision	0	0

Res.	Record	Opponent	Method	Event	Date	Round	Time	Location	Notes
Win	2–0	Ed Mouse	TKO (punches)	COC 2: Overthrow	May 17, 2008	2	1:51	St. Clairsville, Ohio, United States	
Win	1–0	Shawn Ady	Submission (arm-triangle choke)	HKCF: Hard Knocks Cage Fights 1	October 27, 2007	1	2:41	St. Clairsville, Ohio, United States	
