= Ulysses Gomez =

American mixed martial arts fighter

- Born: May 25, 1983 (age 43); Los Angeles, California, U.S.
- Other names: Useless
- Height: 5 ft 6 in (1.68 m)
- Weight: 125 lb (57 kg; 8.9 st)
- Division: Flyweight (2008-present); Bantamweight (2010-12)
- Reach: 66 in (168 cm)
- Fighting out of: Las Vegas, Nevada
- Team: Simpson Go's Cobra Kai
- Trainer: Simpson Go (jiu-jitsu) Gil Martinez (striking)
- Rank: Black belt in Brazilian Jiu-Jitsu
- Years active: 2008–present

Mixed martial arts record
- Total: 14
- Wins: 9
- By submission: 7
- By decision: 2
- Losses: 5
- By knockout: 1
- By submission: 1
- By decision: 3

Other information
- Mixed martial arts record from Sherdog

Ulysses Gomez (born May 25, 1983) is an American mixed martial artist who competes in the flyweight and bantamweight divisions. A professional MMA competitor since 2007, Gomez has mostly fought in PFC and Tachi Palace Fights and is also known for his grappling career.

== Early life ==
Gomez was born in Los Angeles, California to Mexican-Americans parents. He is the brother of former soccer player and U.S. national team representative Herculez Gomez. Before his fights, Ulysses has worn the shirt of the club that his brother plays for. This has included the Kansas City Wizards and Club Puebla.

== Mixed martial arts career ==
=== Background ===
Gomez has been training with Marc Laimon since he was in high school. Gomez' high school wrestling coach was UFC veteran and Nova União black belt Tony DeSouza. In 2004, Gomez helped Laimon found the Cobra Kai Academy in Las Vegas, Nevada, where he trained and taught the children's class. Since Marc Laimons move to Texas in 2010, Gomez is now training under Laimon's 1st Blackbelt and now owner of Cobra Kai, Simpson Go.

=== Early career ===
Gomez began his career in PFC, in Lemoore, California. Gomez quickly amassed a record of 2–0, both via submission. Gomez then fought Thai Rambaa Somdet and lost via unanimous decision.

In his final fight for the Palace Fights Championship, Gomez defeated David Suarez.

Gomez then joined Tachi Palace Fights and competed in their first event, against Martin Sandoval.

In his second appearance for Tachi Palace Fights, Gomez defeated Chino Nicholas via technical submission (standing guillotine choke), when Nicholas refused to tap and passed out.

Gomez fought Luis Gonzalez for the inaugural Tachi Palace Fights Flyweight Championship at TPF 4: Cinco de Mayhem. Gomez defeated Gonzalez to take the title, but then immediately announced his signing with Bellator, in addition to his move in weight class. The fight was closely fought and Gomez' decision victory over Gonzalez was heavily booed by the crowd.

=== Bellator Fighting Championships ===
In May 2010, Gomez signed with Bellator Fighting Championships and moved up a weight class, to compete in their upcoming bantamweight tournament in their third season.

In his opening round fight, at Bellator 27, Gomez faced Travis Reddinger, which Gomez won via split decision. Gomez would have faced Zach Makovsky in the semi-final; however, Gomez had to withdraw with a staph infection.

=== Ultimate Fighting Championship ===
Gomez made his promotional debut against John Moraga on August 4, 2012 at UFC on Fox: Shogun vs. Vera. He lost the fight via KO in the first round.

Gomez next faced Phil Harris on February 16, 2013 at UFC on Fuel TV: Barão vs. McDonald. Gomez lost the fight by unanimous decision and was subsequently released from the promotion.

=== Post-UFC career ===
Gomez faced Abel Cullum at RFA 18: Manzanares vs. Pantoja on September 12, 2014, in his first fight post-UFC release. He lost the fight by a first-round submission.

== Mixed martial arts record ==
Professional record breakdown
14 matches	9 wins	5 losses
By knockout	0	1
By submission	7	1
By decision	2	3

Res.	Record	Opponent	Method	Event	Date	Round	Time	Location	Notes
Loss	9–5	Abel Cullum	Submission (guillotine choke)	RFA 18: Manzanares vs. Pantoja	September 12, 2014	1	1:29	Albuquerque, New Mexico, United States	
Loss	9–4	Phil Harris	Decision (unanimous)	UFC on Fuel TV: Barão vs. McDonald	February 16, 2013	3	5:00	London, England	
Loss	9–3	John Moraga	KO (elbows and punches)	UFC on Fox: Shogun vs. Vera	August 4, 2012	1	3:46	Los Angeles, California, United States	
Win	9–2	Cody Gibson	Submission (guillotine choke)	TPF 11: Redemption	December 2, 2011	3	2:36	Lemoore, California, United States	Won TPF Bantamweight Championship
Win	8–2	Drew Bittner	Submission (rear-naked choke)	TPF 10: Let The Chips Fall	August 5, 2011	2	1:21	Lemoore, California, United States	Fought at Bantamweight
Loss	7–2	Darrell Montague	Decision (unanimous)	TPF 8: All or Nothing	February 18, 2011	5	5:00	Lemoore, California, United States	Lost TPF Flyweight Championship
Win	7–1	Travis Reddinger	Decision (split)	Bellator 27	September 2, 2010	3	5:00	San Antonio, Texas, United States	BW Quarterfinal Tournament Bout
Win	6–1	Luis Gonzalez	Decision (unanimous)	TPF 4: Cinco de Mayhem	May 5, 2010	5	5:00	Lemoore, California, United States	Won first-ever TPF Flyweight Championship
Win	5–1	Chino Nicolas	Submission (guillotine choke)	TPF 2: Brawl in the Hall	December 3, 2009	1	4:31	Lemoore, California, United States	
Win	4–1	Martin Sandoval	Submission (rear-naked choke)	TPF 1: Tachi Palace Fights 1	October 8, 2009	2	0:36	Lemoore, California, United States	
Win	3–1	David Suarez	Submission (rear-naked choke)	PFC: Best of Both Worlds	February 6, 2009	1	1:45	Lemoore, California, United States	
Loss	2–1	Rambaa Somdet	Decision (unanimous)	PFC 11: All In	November 20, 2008	3	3:00	Lemoore, California, United States	
Win	2–0	Hector Sandoval	Submission (armbar)	PFC 9: The Return	July 18, 2008	1	0:51	Lemoore, California, United States	
Win	1–0	Greg McDowell	Submission (choke)	PFC 7: Palace Fighting Championship 7	May 20, 2008	1	0:41	Lemoore, California, United States	

== Grappling career ==
Gomez is a highly accomplished grappler, having won multiple awards and competitions. These include being ranked top of his weight class in Grapplers Quest. Gomez also competed in Pancrase. Gomez began as a beginner, entering himself into pro divisions and "began submitting black belts shortly after receiving his blue belt"

Gomez then main evented the opening day of the inaugural UFC Fan Expo in a Grapplers Quest exhibition match against Shooto tournament winner and 40-fight MMA veteran Rumina Sato; a natural featherweight. Gomez was defeated by submission (armbar).
