= Hector Sandoval =

Mexican mixed martial arts fighter

- Born: July 19, 1986 (age 40); Uruapan, Michoacán, Mexico
- Other names: Kid Alex
- Height: 5 ft 2 in (1.57 m)
- Weight: 125 lb (57 kg; 8.9 st)
- Division: Flyweight
- Reach: 64 in (163 cm)
- Fighting out of: Sacramento, California
- Team: Team Alpha Male
- Years active: 2008–present

Mixed martial arts record
- Total: 19
- Wins: 15
- By knockout: 4
- By submission: 2
- By decision: 9
- Losses: 4
- By knockout: 2
- By submission: 2

Other information
- Mixed martial arts record from Sherdog

Hector Sandoval (born July 19, 1986) is a Mexican professional mixed martial artist, who competed in the Ultimate Fighting Championship. He currently competes in the flyweight division. At 5 ft 2 in (1.57 m), he is the shortest male fighter in the history of the UFC.

== Background ==
Born in Uruapan, Michoacán, Mexico, Sandoval moved to San Jose, California, as a child. He began training in mixed martial arts in 2006 at the age of 19.

== Mixed martial arts career ==
Sandoval made his professional debut in July 2008. He compiled a record of 12–2 on the regional scene in California, including stints for Palace Fighting Championship and Tachi Palace Fights, before signing with the UFC on the heels of a four fight winning streak in June 2016.

=== Ultimate Fighting Championship ===
Morales made his promotional debut as a short notice replacement against Wilson Reis on July 30, 2016, at UFC 201. He lost the fight via submission in the first round.

Sandoval faced Fredy Serrano on December 17, 2016, at UFC on Fox 22. He won the fight via unanimous decision.

Sandoval faced Matt Schnell on April 22, 2017, at UFC Fight Night 108. He won via knockout in the first round.

Sandoval faced Dustin Ortiz on August 5, 2017, at UFC Fight Night 114. He lost the fight via knockout in the first round.

Sandoval was scheduled to face Jarred Brooks on June 1, 2018, at UFC Fight Night 131. However, Sandoval was removed from the bout on May 22 for undisclosed reasons and replaced by promotional newcomer Jose Torres.

It was reported in November 2018 that Sandoval was released from UFC.

=== Post-career ===
After being released from the UFC, Sandoval next faced Jorge Calvo Martin at Combate Americas's event Combate 37 on May 10, 2019. Sandoval won the fight via unanimous decision.

Sandoval was expected to face John Moraga at ARES 2 on April 3, 2020. However, due to the COVID-19 pandemic, the event was postponed until October 30, 2020.

== Championships and accomplishments ==
- Tachi Palace Fights
  - TPF Flyweight Championship (One time)

== Mixed martial arts record ==
Professional record breakdown
19 matches	15 wins	4 losses
By knockout	4	2
By submission	2	2
By decision	9	0

Res.	Record	Opponent	Method	Event	Date	Round	Time	Location	Notes
Win	15–4	Jorge Calvo Martin	Decision (unanimous)	Combate 36: Sanchez vs. Velasco	May 10, 2019	3	5:00	Stockton, California, United States	
Loss	14–4	Dustin Ortiz	KO (punches)	UFC Fight Night: Pettis vs. Moreno	August 5, 2017	1	0:15	Mexico City, Mexico	
Win	14–3	Matt Schnell	KO (punches)	UFC Fight Night: Swanson vs. Lobov	April 22, 2017	1	4:24	Nashville, Tennessee, United States	
Win	13–3	Fredy Serrano	Decision (unanimous)	UFC on Fox: VanZant vs. Waterson	December 17, 2016	3	5:00	Sacramento, California, United States	
Loss	12–3	Wilson Reis	Submission (rear-naked choke)	UFC 201	July 30, 2016	1	1:49	Atlanta, Georgia, United States	
Win	12–2	Eloy Garza	TKO (punches)	Global Knockout 6	March 26, 2016	1	3:19	Jackson, California, United States	Won the Global Knockout Flyweight Championship.
Win	11–2	Martin Sandoval	Decision (unanimous)	TPF 26: Brawl in the Hall	February 18, 2016	3	5:00	Lemoore, California, United States	
Win	10–2	Derrick Easterling	Decision (unanimous)	Conquer Fighting Championships	November 21, 2015	3	5:00	Richmond, California, United States	
Win	9–2	Oscar Ramirez	TKO (punches)	West Coast FC 13	February 28, 2015	2	0:41	Sacramento, California, United States	Won the West Coast FC Flyweight Championship.
Loss	8–2	Willie Gates	TKO (punches)	TPF 21: All or Nothing	November 6, 2014	1	1:23	Lemoore, California, United States	Lost the TPF Bantamweight Championship.
Win	8–1	Ryan Hollis	Decision (unanimous)	TPF 20: Night of Champions	August 7, 2014	5	5:00	Lemoore, California, United States	Won the vacant TPF Flyweight Championship.
Win	7–1	Benjamin Vinson	Decision (unanimous)	TPF 18: Martinez vs. Culley	February 6, 2014	3	5:00	Lemoore, California, United States	
Win	6–1	Robert Schepps	Decision (unanimous)	Rogue Fights 22	April 13, 2013	3	5:00	Redding, California, United States	
Win	5–1	Andrew Vallarerez	Submission (guillotine choke)	Dragon House 13	February 2, 2013	1	0:50	Oakland, California, United States	
Win	4–1	Taylor McCorriston	Decision (unanimous)	Impact MMA - Recognition	December 10, 2011	3	5:00	Pleasanton, California, United States	
Win	3–1	Bobby Escalante	TKO (punches)	UPC Unlimited 6	September 10, 2011	1	2:53	Turlock, California, United States	
Win	2–1	Jordan Felix	Submission (armbar)	Gladiator Challenge - Warpath	May 21, 2011	2	1:04	Placerville, California, United States	
Win	1–1	Ronald Carillo	Decision (unanimous)	CCFC - El Reventon	April 24, 2010	3	5:00	Santa Rosa, California, United States	
Loss	0–1	Ulysses Gomez	Submission (armbar)	PFC 9: The Return	July 18, 2008	1	0:51	Lemoore, California, United States	

== See also ==
- List of Mexican UFC fighters
- List of male mixed martial artists
