= Waachiim Spiritwolf =

American mixed martial arts fighter (born 1976)

- Born: February 6, 1976 (age 50); Pala Indian Reservation, California, United States
- Other names: The Native Warrior
- Nationality: American
- Height: 5 ft 8 in (1.73 m)
- Weight: 170.6 lb (77.4 kg; 12.19 st)
- Division: Welterweight
- Reach: 69.0 in (175 cm)
- Stance: Southpaw
- Fighting out of: San Diego, California, United States
- Team: Spiritwolf MMA
- Years active: 2006–present

Mixed martial arts record
- Total: 28
- Wins: 12
- By knockout: 8
- By submission: 1
- By decision: 3
- Losses: 13
- By knockout: 4
- By submission: 1
- By decision: 8
- Draws: 1
- No contests: 2

Other information
- Mixed martial arts record from Sherdog

Waachiim Spiritwolf is a Native American professional mixed martial artist who last competed in the Welterweight division. A professional competitor since from 2006 until 2015, he competed for King of the Cage, Tachi Palace Fights, Bellator, and Strikeforce.

== Background ==
Spiritwolf is from the Pala Indian Reservation and represents the Navajo and Yaqui tribes. In high school, he was a talented wrestler and was also a captain of his football team, playing the inside linebacker position. He was introduced to mixed martial arts when he began training in Brazilian jiu-jitsu with his friend and professional mixed martial artist, Dean Lister. Spiritwolf had known Lister since he was in middle school and both of them were fans of mixed martial arts, watching UFC fights together. Lister is also the godfather of Spiritwolf's son. Spiritwolf coaches wrestling at Scripps Ranch High School.

== Mixed martial arts career ==
=== Early career ===
After competing for local events and King of the Cage, Spiritwolf was booked for the main card of the Ultimate Chaos pay-per-view. Prior to the bout, Spiritwolf accused his heavily-favored opponent Brett Cooper of looking ahead to his August 1 bout at Affliction: Trilogy. Spiritwolf was able to get the upset and knocked out Cooper in the first round. Spiritwolf also received a notable win over UFC veteran Crafton Wallace, before signing with Strikeforce in late-2010.

=== King of the Cage ===
In December 2008, Spiritwolf signed with California based promotion King of the Cage. He made his debut for the promotion on December 11, 2008, facing Ricky Legere at KOTC: Prowler. Spiritwolf won the bout via second round TKO. In his second fight for the promotion, Spiritwolf faced Ricky Legere in a rematch at KOTC: Distorted on October 1, 2009, for the KOTC Welterweight Championship. He lost the bout via TKO.

He then faced Ismael Gonzalez at KOTC: Arrival on February 25, 2010. The bout was ruled a technical draw, after Spiritwolf landed a punch to the back of the head, to which Gonzalez subsequently claimed that he couldn't see straight.

=== Strikeforce ===
Spiritwolf signed with Strikeforce to fight undefeated Billy Evangelista in a 165-Catchweight bout at Strikeforce Challengers: Bowling vs. Voelker. Spiritwolf started off the first round by knocking down Evangelista, and then landed another takedown, using the ground and pound technique. Spiritwolf landed three more takedowns in the second round, but Evangelista seemed to have a better round, landing punches and more knees from the clinch. The 34-year-old Spiritwolf seemed to be tired during the third round as Evangelista landed combinations, but continued to hold his own, demonstrating his true heart by answering back with some big punches, and then slamming the undefeated Evangelista in the final ten seconds. However, Evangelista would remain undefeated as the judges scored the contest in favor of him, making Evangelista the winner via unanimous decision.

Spiritwolf said after the fight he should have won. "I come to fight and that's what I did tonight," he said. "It is bad enough I thought I deserved the decision, but to not get a round on those scorecards is ridiculous. Honestly, I feel I got ripped off."

Spiritwolf fought DREAM Welterweight Champion Marius Zaromskis at Strikeforce Challengers: Wilcox vs. Ribeiro. However, the bout was declared a no contest six seconds into the first round after Spiritwolf was accidentally poked in the eye.

=== Bellator ===
Spiritwolf made his debut for Bellator in March 2011. He faced Jaime Jara at Bellator 35 and won the back-and-forth battle via split decision. Although the bout took place on the unaired preliminary portion of the card, Bellator CEO Bjorn Rebney stated that fan interest to see the fight convinced him to air it during the following week's Bellator 36 airing on MTV2.

In his second fight for the promotion, Spiritwolf faced Marius Žaromskis in a rematch. Spiritwolf weighed in a pound and a half overweight and was forced to forfeit part of his purse. Once again, the contest between the two ended in controversy as the doctor stopped the fight between rounds two and three due to a cut suffered by Spiritwolf, giving Žaromskis the TKO win.

Due to the controversial nature of this stoppage, Spiritwolf and Marius Žaromskis had a rematch - the third fight between the two - at Bellator 72. He lost the fight via split decision.

Spiritwolf returned to the promotion on March 21, 2013 to face former UFC veteran Marcus Davis at Bellator 93. Unfortunately, the bout ended in a no contest when Davis hit Spiritwolf with a knee to the groin, in the first round and he could not continue.

=== Independent promotions ===
Spiritwolf faced Morten Djursaa at EUMMA 5 on April 19, 2013. He lost the bout via KO, less than a minute within the fight. He then got his first win since his Bellator debut, when he defeated James Chaney at Shinzo Fight Sport on August 16, 2013, via second round TKO.

He faced independent prospect Max Griffin at TWC 19 on January 15, 2014. He lost the fight via split decision. Spiritwolf was expected to face Angel Deanda at Tachi Palace Fights 20 on August 7, 2014. However, the bout would be cancelled for unknown reasons.

== Championships and accomplishments ==
- World Fighting Championships
  - WFC Welterweight Championship (One time)

== Mixed martial arts record ==
Professional record breakdown
| 28 matches | 12 wins | 13 losses |
| By knockout | 8 | 4 |
| By submission | 1 | 1 |
| By decision | 3 | 8 |
| Draws | 1 | |
| No contests | 2 | |

| Res. | Record | Opponent | Method | Event | Date | Round | Time | Location | Notes |
|---|---|---|---|---|---|---|---|---|---|
| Win | 12–13–1 (2) | J.C. Llamas | Decision (unanimous) | TWC 22: The Warriors Cage | June 26, 2015 | 3 | 5:00 | Porterville, California, United States | Catchweight (175 lbs) bout. |
| Win | 11–13–1 (2) | Edward Darby | TKO (punches) | XPS: Wasteland | November 8, 2014 | 1 | 1:51 | Valley Center, California, United States | |
| Loss | 10–13–1 (2) | Max Griffin | Decision (split) | TWC 1: Blackout | January 25, 2014 | 3 | 5:00 | Porterville, California, United States | |
| Win | 10–12–1 (2) | James Chaney | TKO (punches) | Shinzo Fight Sport | August 16, 2013 | 2 | 4:07 | Guatemala City, Guatemala | |
| Loss | 9–12–1 (2) | Morten Djursaa | KO (head kick and punches) | EUMMA 5 | April 19, 2013 | 1 | 0:40 | Frederiksberg, Copenhagen, Denmark | For the EUMMA Welterweight Championship. |
| NC | 9–11–1 (2) | Marcus Davis | NC (knee to the groin) | Bellator 93 | March 21, 2013 | 1 | 3:05 | Lewiston, Maine, United States | Spiritwolf could not continue after an illegal knee to the groin by Davis. |
| Loss | 9–11–1 (1) | Marius Žaromskis | Decision (split) | Bellator 72 | July 20, 2012 | 3 | 5:00 | Tampa, Florida, United States | |
| Loss | 9–10–1 (1) | Marius Žaromskis | TKO (cut) | Bellator 68 | May 11, 2012 | 2 | 5:00 | Atlantic City, New Jersey, United States | Catchweight (172 lbs) bout. |
| Loss | 9–9–1 (1) | Michael Madrid | Decision (unanimous) | Samurai MMA Pro 2011 | October 21, 2011 | 3 | 5:00 | Culver City, California, United States | |
| Loss | 9–8–1 (1) | Jorge Lopez | Decision (unanimous) | TPF 9: The Contenders | May 5, 2011 | 3 | 5:00 | Lemoore, California, United States | Catchweight (172 lbs) bout. |
| Win | 9–7–1 (1) | Jaime Jara | Decision (split) | Bellator 35 | March 5, 2011 | 3 | 5:00 | Lemoore, California, United States | Catchweight (175 lbs) bout. |
| NC | 8–7–1 (1) | Marius Žaromskis | NC (eye poke) | Strikeforce Challengers: Wilcox vs. Ribeiro | November 19, 2010 | 1 | 0:06 | Jackson, Mississippi, United States | Accidental eye poke by Žaromskis. |
| Loss | 8–7–1 | Billy Evangelista | Decision (unanimous) | Strikeforce Challengers: Bowling vs. Voelker | October 22, 2010 | 3 | 5:00 | Fresno, California, United States | Catchweight (165 lbs) bout. |
| Loss | 8–6–1 | Delson Heleno | Decision (unanimous) | AOF 9: Apocalypse | September 4, 2010 | 3 | 5:00 | Jacksonville, Florida, United States | For the AOF Welterweight Championship. |
| Win | 8–5–1 | Crafton Wallace | TKO (doctor stoppage) | AOF 8: Fury | May 22, 2010 | 1 | 5:00 | Estero, Florida, United States | |
| Win | 7–5–1 | Fernando Bettega | Decision (unanimous) | Collision in the Cage | March 20, 2010 | 3 | 5:00 | Irvine, California, United States | |
| Draw | 6–5–1 | Ismael Gonzalez | Technical draw | KOTC: Arrival | February 25, 2010 | 1 | 4:00 | Highland, California, United States | |
| Loss | 6–5 | Ricky Legere | TKO (punches) | KOTC: Distorted | October 1, 2009 | 2 | 2:25 | Highland, California, United States | For the vacant KOTC Light Welterweight Championship. |
| Win | 6–4 | Brett Cooper | TKO (punches) | FFI: Ultimate Chaos | June 27, 2009 | 1 | 3:41 | Biloxi, Mississippi, United States | |
| Win | 5–4 | Ricky Legere | KO (punch) | KOTC: Prowler | December 11, 2008 | 2 | 0:16 | Highland, California, United States | |
| Loss | 4–4 | Ross Ebañez | TKO (cut) | ROTR: Beatdown 9 | October 18, 2008 | 1 | 2:53 | Hawaii, United States | |
| Win | 4–3 | Danny Ruiz | KO (punches) | WFC 6: Battle in the Bay | March 22, 2008 | 1 | 4:31 | Tampa, Florida, United States | Won the WFC Welterweight Championship. |
| Loss | 3–3 | Shamar Bailey | Decision (unanimous) | Revolution Fight League 1 | December 1, 2007 | 3 | 5:00 | Louisville, Kentucky, United States | |
| Win | 3–2 | Roger Krahl | Submission (guillotine choke) | World Fighting Championships 5 | October 26, 2007 | 1 | 4:14 | Tampa, Florida, United States | |
| Loss | 2–2 | Kenneth Alexander | Submission (injury) | Tuff-N-Uff 3 | June 22, 2007 | 1 | 4:55 | Las Vegas, Nevada, United States | |
| Win | 2–1 | Enrique Luna | TKO (strikes) | Clash of the Titans 4 | December 4, 2006 | 2 | 1:11 | Tijuana, Mexico | |
| Loss | 1–1 | Kyle Brees | Decision (split) | RITC 83: Rampage | June 10, 2006 | 3 | 3:00 | Arizona, United States | |
| Win | 1–0 | Anthony Soto | TKO (punches) | Cage of Fire 1 | April 22, 2006 | 1 | 3:42 | Tijuana, Mexico | |
