= 2010 in Tachi Palace Fights =

Information
- First date: February 4, 2010
- Last date: December 2, 2010

Events
- Total events: 5

Fights
- Total fights: 53
- Title fights: 9

Chronology
2009 in Tachi Palace Fights	2010 in Tachi Palace Fights	2011 in Tachi Palace Fights

The year 2010 is the second year in the history of Tachi Palace Fights, a mixed martial arts promotion based in The United States. In 2010 Tachi Palace Fights held 5 events beginning with, TPF 3: Champions Collide.

== Title fights ==
Title fights in 2010
Weight class				Method	Round	Time	Event	Notes
Bantamweight	Cole Escovedo	def.	Jeff Bedard	Submission (Triangle Choke)	1	2:31	TPF 3: Champions Collide	(Note: For the Tachi Palace Fights Bantamweight Championship.)
Featherweight	Isaac DeJesus	def.	Nam Phan	TKO (Punches)	1	2:55	TPF 3: Champions Collide	(Note: For the Tachi Palace Fights Featherweight Championship.)
Flyweight	Ulysses Gomez	def.	Luis Gonzalez	Decision (Unanimous)	5	5:00	TPF 4: Cinco de Mayhem	(Note: For the Tachi Palace Fights Flyweight Championship.)
Welterweight	David Mitchell	def.	Tim McKenzie	Submission (Guillotine Choke)	1	1:10	TPF 4: Cinco de Mayhem	(Note: For the Tachi Palace Fights Welterweight Championship.)
Welterweight	David Mitchell (c)	def.	Poppies Martinez	Technical Submission (Triangle Choke)	1	1:32	TPF 5: Stars and Strikes	(Note: For the Tachi Palace Fights Welterweight Championship.)
Bantamweight	Michael McDonald	def.	Cole Escovedo (c)	KO (Punches)	2	1:12	TPF 5: Stars and Strikes	(Note: For the Tachi Palace Fights Bantamweight Championship.)
Lightweight	Gabe Ruediger	def.	Lenny Lovato	TKO (Punches)	1	3:25	TPF 5: Stars and Strikes	(Note: For the Tachi Palace Fights Lightweight Championship.)
Middleweight	Leopoldo Serao	def.	Anthony Ruiz	Decision (Split)	5	5:00	TPF 6: High Stakes	(Note: For the Tachi Palace Fights Middleweight Championship.)
Welterweight	John Alessio	def.	Phil Collins	TKO (Punches)	3	0:35	TPF 7: Deck the Halls	(Note: For the Tachi Palace Fights Welterweight Championship.)

== Events list ==
#	Event Title	Date	Arena	Location
8	TPF 7: Deck the Halls	December 2, 2010	Tachi Palace	Lemoore, California
7	TPF 6: High Stakes	September 9, 2010	Tachi Palace	Lemoore, California
6	TPF 5: Stars and Strikes	July 9, 2010	Tachi Palace	Lemoore, California
5	TPF 4: Cinco de Mayhem	May 5, 2010	Tachi Palace	Lemoore, California
4	TPF 3: Champions Collide	February 4, 2010	Tachi Palace	Lemoore, California

== TPF 3: Champions Collide ==
TPF 3: Champions Collide was an event held on February 4, 2010, at the Tachi Palace in Lemoore, California.

=== Results ===
Main Card
Weight class				Method	Round	Time	Notes
Bantamweight	Cole Escovedo	def.	Jeff Bedard	Submission (Triangle Choke)	1	2:31	(Note: For the Tachi Palace Fights Bantamweight Championship.)
	Anthony Ruiz	def.	Hector Ramirez	Decision (Split)	3	5:00
Featherweight	Isaac DeJesus	def.	Nam Phan	TKO (Punches)	1	2:55	(Note: For the Tachi Palace Fights Featherweight Championship.)
	Michael McDonald	def.	Manny Tapia	TKO (Punches)	1	4:31
	Gabe Ruediger	def.	Dominique Robinson	Submission (Rear-Naked Choke)	2	4:49
	Gabriel Solorio	def.	Sergio Quinones	Decision (Unanimous)	3	5:00
	Phil Collins	def.	Mike Arellano	Submission (Armbar)	1	3:10
	Anthony Figueroa	vs.	Philip Perez	Technical Draw	1	1:03
	Zoila Frausto	def.	Jessica Rakoczy	Submission (Armbar)	2	1:17
	David Bollea	def.	Tim Denham	Submission (Armbar)	1	1:48
	Art Becerra	def.	Colt Toombs	Decision (Unanimous)	3	3:00
	Mike Guidry	def.	Rafael del Real	Submission (Punches)	1	0:18
	Nader Maghribi	def.	Joshua Miranda	Decision (Unanimous)	3	3:00

== TPF 4: Cinco de Mayhem ==
TPF 4: Cinco de Mayhem was an event held on May 5, 2010, at the Tachi Palace in Lemoore, California.

=== Results ===
Main Card
Weight class				Method	Round	Time	Notes
Flyweight	Ulysses Gomez	def.	Luis Gonzalez	Decision (Unanimous)	5	5:00	(Note: For the Tachi Palace Fights Flyweight Championship.)
	Poppies Martinez	def.	Darren Crisp	Submission (Guillotine Choke)	1	2:46
	Casey Olson	def.	Shawn Klarcyk	Decision (Unanimous)	3	3:00
Middleweight	David Mitchell	def.	Tim McKenzie	Submission (Guillotine Choke)	1	1:10	(Note: For the Tachi Palace Fights Middleweight Championship.)
	Alexander Crispim	def.	Enoch Wilson	Decision (Unanimous)	3	3:00
	Phil Collins	def.	Morris Aldaco	Submission (Heel Hook)	1	2:25
	Darrell Montague	def.	Jeremy Bolt	KO (Kick to the Body)	3	2:21
	Stephen Abas	def.	Sam Stevens-Milo	Decision (Majority)	3	3:00
	Russ Miura	def.	Jesse Bowen	Submission (Arm-Triangle Choke)	2	0:58
	Mark Matthews	vs.	Andrew Martinez	NC (Accidental Eye Poke)	2	2:56
	Romulo Melo	def.	Chase Hackett	Decision (Unanimous)	3	3:00

== TPF 5: Stars and Strikes ==
TPF 5: Stars and Strikes was an event held on July 9, 2010, at the Tachi Palace in Lemoore, California.

=== Results ===
Main Card
Weight class				Method	Round	Time	Notes
	Rob Mccullough	def.	Isaac Dejesus	TKO (Punches)	1	4:31
Middleweight	David Mitchell (c)	def.	Poppies Martinez	Technical Submission (Triangle Choke)	1	1:32	(Note: For the Tachi Palace Fights Middleweight Championship.)
	John Alessio	def.	War Machine	Technical Submission (Rear-Naked Choke)	3	2:24
Bantamweight	Michael McDonald	def.	Cole Escovedo (c)	KO (Punches)	2	1:12	(Note: For the Tachi Palace Fights Bantamweight Championship.)
Lightweight	Gabe Ruediger	def.	Lenny Lovato	TKO (Punches)	1	3:25	(Note: For the Tachi Palace Fights Lightweight Championship.)
	Dominique Robinson	def.	David Kaplan	TKO (Elbows)	3	0:57
	Stephen Abas	def.	Joey de la Cruz	Decision (Unanimous)	3	3:00
	David Bollea	def.	Cody Gibson	Submission (Armlock)	2	0:31
	Drew Bittner	def.	Francisco Loredo	Decision (Unanimous)	3	5:00

== TPF 6: High Stakes ==
TPF 6: High Stakes was an event held on September 9, 2010, at the Tachi Palace in Lemoore, California.

=== Results ===
Main Card
Weight class				Method	Round	Time	Notes
	Kyacey Uscola	def.	Doug Marshall	KO (Punches)	1	3:17
Middleweight	Leopoldo Serao	def.	Anthony Ruiz	Decision (Split)	5	5:00	(Note: For the Tachi Palace Fights Middleweight Championship.)
	Rob McCullough	def.	Corey Hill	Decision (Unanimous)	3	5:00
	Micah Miller	def.	Diego Saraiva	Decision (Unanimous)	3	5:00
	Darrell Montague	def.	Luis Gonzalez	KO (Punches)	1	4:42
	Joseph Henle	vs.	Collin Hart	Draw	3	5:00
	Paulina Ramirez	def.	Stephanie Frausto	Decision (Split)	3	3:00
	Andrew Martinez	def.	Mark Matthews	KO (Punches)	1	2:41
	Art Becerra	def.	Gabriel Solorio	Technical Submission (Rear-Naked Choke)	2	3:22

== TPF 7: Deck the Halls ==
TPF 7: Deck the Halls was an event held on December 2, 2010, at the Tachi Palace in Lemoore, California.

=== Results ===
Main Card
Weight class				Method	Round	Time	Notes
Catchweight (212 lbs)	Jorge Oliveira	def.	James Irvin	Submission (Triangle Armbar)	1	1:33
Flyweight	Jussier da Silva	def.	Danny Martinez	Decision (Unanimous)	3	5:00
Featherweight	Micah Miller	def.	Isaac DeJesus	Submission (Neck Crank)	1	4:11
Middleweight	John Alessio	def.	Phil Collins	TKO (Punches)	3	0:35	(Note: For the Tachi Palace Fights Middleweight Championship.)
Catchweight (175 lbs)	Seth Baczynski	def.	Tim McKenzie	KO (Punches and Elbows)	1	2:15
Middleweight	Jay Silva	def.	Jaime Jara	KO (Punches)	1	0:33
Bantamweight	Tommy Vargas	def.	Martin Sandoval	Decision (Unanimous)	3	5:00
Catchweight (150 lbs)	Tony Llamas	def.	Sergio Quinones	Submission (Armbar)	2	2:03
Heavyweight	Jimmy Ambriz	def.	Mike Guidry	TKO (Punches)	2	4:29
Light Heavyweight	Nik Fekete	def.	Chris Bostick	TKO (Punches)	2	4:06

== See also ==
- Tachi Palace Fights
