= Paul Ruiz (mixed martial artist) =

American mixed martial arts fighter

- Born: June 23, 1987 (age 39); Firebaugh, California, United States
- Nationality: American
- Height: 5 ft 6 in (1.68 m)
- Weight: 139.9 lb (63.5 kg; 9.99 st)
- Division: Bantamweight
- Reach: 68.0
- Fighting out of: Firebaugh, California, United States
- Team: Team Alpha Male
- Years active: 2011-2016

Mixed martial arts record
- Total: 10
- Wins: 7
- By knockout: 3
- By submission: 1
- By decision: 3
- Losses: 3
- By decision: 3

Other information
- Mixed martial arts record from Sherdog

Paul Ruiz (born June 23, 1987) is an American mixed martial artist who last competed in the Bantamweight division of Bellator MMA. A professional competitor since 2010 to 2016, he also competed for Strikeforce and Tachi Palace Fights.

== Mixed martial arts record ==
Professional record breakdown
10 matches	7 wins	3 losses
By knockout	3	0
By submission	1	0
By decision	3	3

Res.	Record	Opponent	Method	Event	Date	Round	Time	Location	Notes
Win	7-3	Christian Buron-Navarro	Decision (split)	Bellator 156	June 17, 2016	3	5:00	Fresno, California, United States	Catchweight (140 lbs) bout.
Loss	6-3	Josh San Diego	Decision (unanimous)	Bellator 148	January 29, 2016	3	5:00	Fresno, California, United States	
Win	6-2	Nick Sperling	Submission (rear-naked choke)	Bellator 133	February 13, 2015	1	0:43	Fresno, California, United States	
Loss	5-2	Joe Neal	Decision (unanimous)	Bellator 125	September 19, 2014	3	5:00	Fresno, California, United States	
Win	5-1	Ed Tomaselli	TKO (punches)	TWC 19: Blackout	January 25, 2014	1	1:14	Porterville, California, United States	
Win	4-1	Steven Urias	Decision (unanimous)	UPC Unlimited: Up & Comers 12: Turning Point	September 22, 2012	3	3:00	Coarsegold, California, United States	
Win	3-1	Ruben Trujillo	TKO (punches)	TPF 13: Unfinished Business	May 10, 2012	1	1:13	Lemoore, California, United States	Return to Bantamweight.
Loss	2-1	Anthony Figueroa	Decision (unanimous)	TPF 11: Redemption	December 2, 2011	3	5:00	Lemoore, California, United States	Flyweight debut.
Win	2-0	Caleb Vallotton	Decision (unanimous)	UPC Unlimited: Up & Comers 4	June 24, 2011	3	5:00	Madera, California, United States	
Win	1-0	Jesus Castro	TKO (punches)	Bellator XXXV	March 5, 2011	1	1:17	Lemoore, California, United States	

=== Mixed martial arts amateur record ===
Amateur record breakdown		
2 matches	2 wins	0 losses
By submission	1	0
By decision	1	0

Res.	Record	Opponent	Method	Event	Date	Round	Time	Location	Notes
Win	2-0	Gregg Baker	Submission (Armbar)	Strikeforce Challengers: Bowling vs. Voelker	October 22, 2010	1	1:23	Fresno, California, United States	
Win	1-0	John Chacon	Decision (Unanimous)	Strikeforce Challengers: Johnson vs. Mahe	March 26, 2010	3	2:00	Fresno, California, United States	

== See also ==
- List of male mixed martial artists
