= Tim McKenzie =

American mixed martial arts fighter

- Born: July 21, 1982 (age 44); Santa Clara, California, United States
- Other names: Wrecking Machine
- Height: 5 ft 11 in (1.80 m)
- Weight: 170 lb (77 kg; 12 st)
- Division: Heavyweight; Light Heavyweight; Middleweight; Welterweight
- Fighting out of: Stockton, California, United States; Tempe, Arizona, United States; Lodi, California, United States
- Team: Team Cesar Gracie; AZ Combat Sports
- Years active: 2001–2011

Mixed martial arts record
- Total: 23
- Wins: 14
- By knockout: 8
- By submission: 5
- By decision: 1
- Losses: 9
- By knockout: 4
- By submission: 5

Other information
- Mixed martial arts record from Sherdog

Tim McKenzie (born July 21, 1982) is an American retired professional mixed martial artist. A professional competitor from 2001 until 2011, he fought in the Ultimate Fighting Championship, World Extreme Cagefighting, Pancrase, and Tachi Palace Fights. Known for his exciting fighting style, only one of his 23 career bouts made it to a decision.

== Background ==
Born and raised in California, McKenzie began training in MMA while attending University of the Pacific alongside fellow fighters Nick Diaz and his younger brother Nate Diaz, under the tutelage of head coach Cesar Gracie. Later during his career McKenzie moved to Tempe, Arizona to train with AZ Combat Sports.

== Mixed martial arts career ==
=== Early career ===
McKenzie made his professional debut in 2001, winning his first two fights via first-round TKO, before being signed by the WEC.

=== World Extreme Cagefighting ===
McKenzie made his debut for the pre-Zuffa owned WEC at WEC 6 on March 27, 2003. McKenzie won via TKO in the first round.

McKenzie then won his next four consecutive fights, bringing his career record to an undefeated 7-0 before making his next WEC appearance at WEC 10 against Alex Stiebling. McKenzie was handed his first professional loss via arm-triangle choke in the second round. McKenzie made his next promotional appearance at WEC 17 against Scott Smith and was defeated via first-round TKO.

After the loss to Smith, McKenzie fought Doug Marshall at WEC 17 and won in dominating fashion, finishing the future WEC Light Heavyweight Champion in the first round via TKO. After a loss to Steve Cantwell via rear-naked choke submission at WEC 33, McKenzie made his last appearance for the promotion at WEC 34 against Jeremy Lang and won via guillotine choke submission in the third round.

=== Ultimate Fighting Championship ===
McKenzie made his UFC debut at UFC Fight Night: Condit vs. Kampmann on April 1, 2009 against Aaron Simpson. McKenzie was defeated in the first round via TKO.

=== Post-UFC ===
Since leaving the UFC, McKenzie has gone 2–3 in his last five fights. McKenzie most recently competed on April 16, 2011 at Showdown Fights: Shootout against Jordan Smith. McKenzie won via knockout 11 seconds into the fight.

== Mixed martial arts record ==
Professional record breakdown
23 matches	14 wins	9 losses
By knockout	8	4
By submission	5	5
By decision	1	0

Res.	Record	Opponent	Method	Event	Date	Round	Time	Location	Notes
Win	14–9	Jordan Smith	TKO (punches)	Showdown Fights: Shootout	April 16, 2011	1	0:11	Orem, Utah, United States	
Loss	13–9	Seth Baczynski	TKO (elbows & punches)	TPF 7: Deck the Halls	December 2, 2010	1	2:15	Lemoore, California, United States	Catchweight (174 lbs) bout. Controversial loss due to Baczynski "phantom tapping" due to an armbar, prompting McKenzie to release it before referee stoppage.
Loss	13–8	Josh Thornburg	Submission (armbar)	Global Knockout: Fall Brawl	September 18, 2010	1	0:59	Jackson, California, United States	
Win	13–7	Marcus Gaines	Submission (armbar)	RF: Rebel Fighter	August 21, 2010	1	2:58	Placerville, California, United States	
Loss	12–7	David Mitchell	Submission (guillotine choke)	TPF 4: Cinco de Mayhem	May 5, 2010	1	1:10	Lemoore, California, United States	Return to Welterweight; for the inaugural Tachi Palace Fights Welterweight Championship.
Loss	12–6	Aaron Simpson	TKO (punches)	UFC Fight Night: Condit vs. Kampmann	April 1, 2009	1	1:40	Nashville, Tennessee, United States	
Win	12–5	Jeremy Lang	Submission (guillotine choke)	WEC 34	June 1, 2008	3	0:40	Sacramento, California, United States	Return to Middleweight.
Loss	11–5	Steve Cantwell	Submission (rear-naked choke)	WEC 33	March 26, 2008	1	2:13	Las Vegas, Nevada, United States	
Win	11–4	Yuichi Nakanishi	Submission (rear-naked choke)	BODOGFight: Vancouver	August 25, 2007	2	1:12	Vancouver, British Columbia, Canada	
Loss	10–4	Chael Sonnen	Submission (D'arce choke)	BODOGFight: Costa Rica Combat	February 18, 2007	1	0:13	Costa Rica	
Win	10–3	Mike McGuinnes	TKO	ICFO 1: Stockton	May 13, 2006	1	N/A	Stockton, California, United States	
Win	9–3	Doug Marshall	TKO (punches & elbows)	WEC 19	March 17, 2006	1	3:35	Lemoore, California, United States	
Loss	8–3	Scott Smith	TKO (punches)	WEC 17	October 14, 2005	1	2:25	Lemoore, California, United States	
Win	8–2	Bill Mahood	KO (punches)	Freedom Fight: Canada vs USA	July 9, 2005	1	0:06	Hull, Quebec, Canada	
Loss	7–2	Akihiro Gono	TKO (punches)	Pancrase: Brave 10	November 7, 2004	2	2:53	Chiba, Japan	
Loss	7–1	Alex Stiebling	Submission (arm-triangle choke)	WEC 10	May 21, 2004	2	2:25	Lemoore, California, United States	
Win	7–0	Emanuel Newton	Decision	ROTR: Rage on the River	April 7, 2004	3	3:00	Redding, California, United States	
Win	6–0	Kenny Kingsford	TKO	IFC: Battleground Tahoe	January 31, 2004	2	2:02	Lake Tahoe, Nevada, United States	Light Heavyweight debut.
Win	5–0	Chris Kiever	Submission (heel hook)	IFC: Rumble on the Rio	December 6, 2003	1	0:29	Hidalgo, Texas, United States	Heavyweight debut.
Win	4–0	Shane Davis	Submission (armbar)	IFC WC 18: Big Valley Brawl	July 19, 2003	1	1:31	Lakeport, California, United States	
Win	3–0	John Appleby	TKO (punches)	WEC 6	March 27, 2003	1	1:03	Lemoore, California, United States	
Win	2–0	Paul Ward	TKO	IFC: Night of the Warriors 3	November 16, 2002	1	1:04	Iona, California, United States	Middleweight debut.
Win	1–0	Dax Bruce	TKO (punches)	IFC WC 16: Warriors Challenge 16	November 9, 2001	1	N/A	Orville, California, United States	
