= Willie Gates =

American mixed martial artist

- Born: January 21, 1987 (age 39); Fontana, California, United States
- Other names: Whoop Ass
- Height: 5 ft 8 in (1.73 m)
- Weight: 125 lb (57 kg; 8.9 st)
- Division: Bantamweight; Flyweight
- Reach: 70 in (178 cm)
- Stance: Orthodox
- Fighting out of: Fontana, California, United States
- Team: Pinnacle MMA
- Years active: 2008–present

Mixed martial arts record
- Total: 25
- Wins: 12
- By knockout: 5
- By submission: 4
- By decision: 3
- Losses: 13
- By knockout: 3
- By submission: 7
- By decision: 3

Other information
- Mixed martial arts record from Sherdog

Willie Gates (born January 21, 1987) is an American mixed martial artist currently competing in the Flyweight division. A professional competitor since 2008, he has competed for the UFC, King of the Cage, Tachi Palace Fights, and Bellator MMA.

== Mixed martial arts career ==
=== Early career ===
Born and raised in the Inland Empire region of Southern California, Gates began training in mixed martial arts in 2004. He made his professional debut as a lightweight in October 2008 where he competed in several regional promotions. Gates fought predominantly in his native state of California where he amassed a record of 11–4, competing primarily in the bantamweight division before joining the Ultimate Fighting Championship.

=== Ultimate Fighting Championship ===
Gates made his promotional debut as a short notice replacement for an injured Jussier Formiga against John Moraga on December 13, 2014, at UFC on Fox 13. He lost the back-and-forth fight via submission in the third round.

Gates faced Darrell Montague on July 12, 2015, at The Ultimate Fighter 21 Finale. Gates won the one-sided fight via TKO in the first round.

In a quick turnaround, Gates faced Dustin Ortiz on August 8, 2015, at UFC Fight Night 73, filling in for an injured Ian McCall. He lost the fight via TKO in the third round.

Gates was expected to face Patrick Holohan on May 8, 2016, at UFC Fight Night 87. However, on April 25, Holohan abruptly announced his retirement, citing a rare blood disorder. He was replaced on the card by Ulka Sasaki. Gates lost the fight via submission in the second round.

On June 3 Willie Gates was released from the promotion.

=== Post UFC ===
In his first bout post UFC release, Gates faced Andre Ewell in September 2017, losing by a rear-naked choke submission at KOTC: Never Quit. Gates then lost to George Garcia in October 2018 in a bout for the CXF Bantamweight Championship at CXF 15: Rage in the Cage, with Garcia winning by a rear-naked choke submission in the second round. In March 2019, Gates lost to Marvin Garcia at KOTC: Sin Rival, with Garcia winning by unanimous decision. They then suffered a loss to Ryan MacDonald in October 2021 at Art of Scrap 3, with MacDonald winning by TKO punches during a catchweight (140 lb) bout.

In January 2023, they lost to Musa Toliver at LXF 8: The Return, with Toliver winning by split decision. Gates made a return a few months later against Teruto Ishihara at Urijah Faber's A1 Combat 9 in March 2023, with Ishihara winning by rear-naked choke submission in the first round.

== Bare-knuckle boxing ==
Gates made his Bare Knuckle Fighting Championship debut against Brandon Meneses on June 21, 2025 at BKFC 76. He won the fight by knockout in the first round.

== Mixed martial arts record ==
Professional record breakdown
25 matches	12 wins	13 losses
By knockout	5	3
By submission	4	7
By decision	3	3

Res.	Record	Opponent	Method	Event	Date	Round	Time	Location	Notes
Loss	12–13	Teruto Ishihara	Submission (rear-naked choke)	Urijah Faber's A1 Combat 9	March 18, 2023	1	3:12	Long Beach, California, United States	
Loss	12–12	Musa Toliver	Decision (split)	LXF 8: The Return	January 14, 2023	3	5:00	Commerce, California, United States	
Loss	12–11	Ryan MacDonald	TKO (punches)	Art of Scrap 3	October 30, 2021	3	1:56	Fort Wayne, Indiana, United States	Catchweight (140 lb) bout.
Loss	12–10	Marvin Garcia	Decision (unanimous)	KOTC: Sin Rival	March 10, 2019	3	5:00	Ontario, California, United States	
Loss	12–9	George Garcia	Submission (rear-naked choke)	CXF 15: Rage in the Cage	October 20, 2018	2	2:33	Burbank, California, United States	For CXF Bantamweight Championship. Return to Bantamweight.
Loss	12–8	Andre Ewell	Submission (rear-naked choke)	KOTC: Never Quit	September 2, 2017	3	2:47	Ontario, California, United States	
Loss	12–7	Ulka Sasaki	Submission (rear-naked choke)	UFC Fight Night: Overeem vs. Arlovski	May 8, 2016	2	2:30	Rotterdam, Netherlands	
Loss	12–6	Dustin Ortiz	TKO (elbows and punches)	UFC Fight Night: Teixeira vs. Saint Preux	August 8, 2015	3	2:58	Nashville, Tennessee, United States	
Win	12–5	Darrell Montague	TKO (knees to the body and elbows)	The Ultimate Fighter: American Top Team vs. Blackzilians Finale	July 12, 2015	1	1:36	Las Vegas, Nevada, United States	
Loss	11–5	John Moraga	Submission (rear-naked choke)	UFC on Fox: dos Santos vs. Miocic	December 13, 2014	3	4:06	Phoenix, Arizona, United States	
Win	11–4	Hector Sandoval	TKO (punches)	TPF 21: All or Nothing	November 6, 2014	1	1:23	Lemoore, California, United States	Flyweight debut; won vacant Tachi Palace Fights Flyweight Championship.
Win	10–4	Jimmy Marquez	Submission (rear-naked choke)	Gladiator Challenge: Glove Up	October 4, 2014	1	1:36	San Jacinto, California, United States	
Win	9–4	Chris Chavez	KO (knee)	Gladiator Challenge: Battle Ready	August 23, 2014	1	1:10	El Cajon, California, United States	
Win	8–4	Eddy Gonzalez	Submission (armbar)	Gladiator Challenge: Night of the Champions	July 19, 2014	1	0:20	Rancho Mirage, California, United States	
Win	7–4	Mario Casares	Submission (rear-naked choke)	Gladiator Challenge: Nitro	April 5, 2014	1	1:59	San Jacinto, California, United States	Won vacant Gladiator Challenge Bantamweight Championship.
Loss	6–4	Anthony Perales	Submission (armbar)	SCMMA 2: Inland Empire Strikes Again	May 18, 2013	3	1:43	Ontario, California, United States	
Win	6–3	Justin Santistevan	Submission	Gladiator Challenge: Battleground	March 24, 2013	1	0:28	San Jacinto, California, United States	
Win	5–3	Gary Franklin	TKO (punches)	Gladiator Challenge: Heat Returns	October 28, 2012	1	0:15	San Jacinto, California, United States	
Loss	4–3	Federico Lopez	Decision (unanimous)	MEZ Sports: Pandemonium 7	August 18, 2012	3	5:00	Inglewood, California, United States	
Win	4–2	Jason Carbajal	Decision (unanimous)	FCOC: Fight Club OC	June 7, 2012	3	5:00	Costa Mesa, California, United States	
Win	3–2	Keenan Lewis	Decision (split)	National Fight Alliance: Valley Invasion 2	April 6, 2012	3	5:00	Los Angeles, California, United States	
Win	2–2	Thomas Casarez	Decision (unanimous)	LBFN 13: Long Beach Fight Night 13	November 20, 2011	3	3:00	Long Beach, California, United States	
Win	1–2	Skylar Reider	TKO (punches)	LBFN 11: Long Beach Fight Night 11	January 2, 2011	1	1:14	Long Beach, California, United States	
Loss	0–2	Jimmie Rivera	Submission (triangle choke)	Bellator 2	April 10, 2009	3	3:17	Uncasville, Connecticut, United States	
Loss	0–1	Robbie Peralta	TKO (punches)	GC 85: Cross Fire	October 25, 2008	1	3:50	San Diego, California, United States	

== Bare-knuckle boxing record ==
Professional record breakdown
0 matches	0 wins	0 losses

Res.	Record	Opponent	Method	Event	Date	Round	Time	Location	Notes
Win	1–0	Brandon Meneses	KO	BKFC 76	June 21, 2025	1	1:24	Fort Worth, Texas, United States	

== See also ==
- List of male mixed martial artists
