= Tachi Palace Fights 7 =

Mixed martial arts event in 2010

TPF 7: Deck the Halls
- Promotion: Tachi Palace Fights
- Date: December 2, 2010
- Venue: Tachi Palace Hotel & Casino
- City: Lemoore, California

Event chronology
TPF 6: High Stakes	TPF 7: Deck the Halls	TPF 8: All or Nothing

Tachi Palace Fights 7: Deck the Halls was a mixed martial arts event held by Tachi Palace Fights on December 2, 2010, at the Tachi Palace Hotel & Casino in Lemoore, California.

== Background ==
Chance Farrar was expected to fight at this event against Tommy Vargas, but due to a knee injury he was replaced by Martin Sandoval.

Poppies Martinez suffered an undisclosed injury and was replaced by Ultimate Fighter veteran Seth Baczynski, who will fight Martinez's original opponent, Tim McKenzie.

Jesse Wallace also suffered a knee injury training for his fight against Mike Guidry and was replaced by Jimmy Ambriz.

Micah Miller was to challenge for Jorge DeJesus's featherweight belt, but Miller weighed in 1.2 lbs over the limit, and the bout was changed to a non-title matchup.

== Results ==
Main card
Weight class				Method	Round	Time	Notes
Light Heavyweight	Nik Fekete	def	Chris Bostick	TKO (punches)	2	4:06
Heavyweight	Jimmy Ambriz	def	Mike Guidry	TKO (punches)	2	4:29
Catchweight (150 lbs)	Tony Llamas	def	Sergio Quinones	submission (armbar)	2	2:03
Bantamweight	Tommy Vargas	def	Martin Sandoval	unanimous decision	3	5:00
Middleweight	Jay Silva	def	Jaime Jara	KO (punches)	1	0:33
Catchweight (175 lbs)	Seth Baczynski	def	Tim McKenzie	KO (punches and elbows)	1	2:15
Welterweight	John Alessio	def	Phil Collins	TKO (punches)	3	0:35	(Note: For the Welterweight Championship.)
Featherweight	Micah Miller	def	Jorge DeJesus	submission (neck crank)	1	4:11
Flyweight	Jussier Formiga	def	Danny Martinez	unanimous decision	3	5:00
Catchweight (212 lbs)	Jorge Oliveira	def	James Irvin	submission (triangle choke/armbar)	1	1:33

== See also ==
- Tachi Palace Fights
- 2010 in Tachi Palace Fights
