= Tachi Palace Fights 9 =

Mixed martial arts event in 2011

TPF 9: The Contenders
- Promotion: Tachi Palace Fights
- Date: May 6, 2011
- Venue: Tachi Palace Hotel and Casino
- City: Lemoore, California

Event chronology
TPF 8: All or Nothing	TPF 9: The Contenders	TPF 10: Tachi Palace Fights 10

Tachi Palace Fights 9 was a mixed martial arts event held by Tachi Palace Fights (TPF) on Friday, May 6 at the Tachi Palace Hotel and Casino in Lemoore, California.

== Background ==
Alexis Vila was due to take on John Dodson, but pulled out of the bout with an unknown injury. Dodson was to fight Shooto veteran Mamoru Yamaguchi. However, on April 18, Dodson pulled out of the bout due to undisclosed reasons and Yamaguchi instead fought John Dunsmoor.

Phil Collins was expected to face Waachiim Spiritwolf at this event, but pulled out on February 9 for personal reasons. Spiritwolf instead faced Jorge Lopez.

Jamie Yager was set to fight Alan Jouban, but pulled out of the fight due to injury. Stepping in to fill the void was Chidi Njokuani.

On April 25 it was announced that Cole Escovedo was tapped by the UFC to fight against Renan Barão at UFC 130, leaving Tommy Vargas without an opponent. Farkhad Sharipov stepped in to fight Vargas.

Featherweight champion Isaac DeJesus failed to make weight for his title defense against Russ Miura and was stripped of his belt. Both fighters agreed to a catchweight bout.

== Results ==
Main card
Weight class				Method	Round	Time	Notes
Flyweight	Ian McCall	def.	Dustin Ortiz	Decision (unanimous) (30–27, 30–27, 30–27)	3	5:00
Featherweight	Isaac DeJesus	vs.	Russ Miura	NC (overturned by CSAC)	1	2:52	(Note: For the vacant TPF Featherweight Championship. DeJesus missed weight (146.4 lb) and was stripped of the title. Only Miura was eligible to win the title. Originally a TKO (punches) win for DeJesus; overturned after he tested positive for marijuana.)
Lightweight	Fabricio Camoes	def.	Efraín Escudero	Decision (unanimous) (29–28, 29–28, 29–28)	3	5:00
Middleweight	Gerald Harris	def.	Anthony Ruiz	Decision (unanimous) (30–27, 29–28, 29–28)	3	5:00
Flyweight	Mamoru Yamaguchi	def.	Kevin Dunsmoor	KO (punch)	2	4:03
Catchweight (175 lb)	Jorge Lopez	def.	Waachiim Spiritwolf	Decision (unanimous) (30–27, 30–27, 30–27)	3	5:00
Bantamweight	Farkhad Sharipov	def.	Tommy Vargas	Decision (unanimous) (30–27, 30–27, 29–28)	3	5:00
Welterweight	Chidi Njokuani	def.	Alan Jouban	KO (kick to the body)	3	1:27
Preliminary card
Featherweight	Art Arciniega	def.	Josh Herrick	Submission (triangle choke)	1	1:08	(Note: Herrick missed weight (148.8 lb).)
Bantamweight	Cody Gibson	def.	Walel Watson	TKO (punches and elbows)	2	4:09
Featherweight	Brad McDonald	def.	Jesse Bowen	Decision (split) (29–28, 28–29, 29–28)	3	3:00
Welterweight	Kenny Ento	def.	James Chaney	TKO (doctor stoppage)	2	1:53
Bantamweight	Alex Perez	def.	Jesus Castro	TKO (punches)	1	1:57
