= Darrell Montague =

American martial artist

- Born: November 3, 1987 (age 38); Chino, California, U.S.
- Other names: The Mongoose
- Height: 5 ft 6 in (1.68 m)
- Weight: 125 lb (57 kg; 8.9 st)
- Division: Flyweight (125 lb); Bantamweight (135 lb)
- Reach: 67.0 in (170 cm)
- Fighting out of: Chino, California, United States
- Team: Millennia MMA Gym
- Years active: 2008–present

Mixed martial arts record
- Total: 18
- Wins: 13
- By knockout: 5
- By submission: 5
- By decision: 3
- Losses: 5
- By knockout: 3
- By submission: 1
- By decision: 1

Other information
- Mixed martial arts record from Sherdog

Darrell Montague (born November 3, 1987) is an American mixed martial artist who formerly competed in the flyweight division of the Ultimate Fighting Championship.

== Background ==
Montague, originally from Chino, California, grew up around the sport of boxing and began competing in high school wrestling at the age of 15. The assistant coach, mixed martial arts fighter Manny Tapia, drew Montague's interest into MMA, and Montague soon also began training in Muay Thai and Brazilian jiu-jitsu.

== Mixed martial arts career ==
=== Early career ===
Montague started his MMA career in 2008 and fought mainly for local organizations. He compiled a professional record of 6–1, losing only once against UFC veteran Robbie Peralta.

=== Tachi Palace Fights ===
After winning two bouts, Montague faced Ulysses Gomez on February 18, 2011 at Tachi Palace Fights 8 for the flyweight title. He won via unanimous decision and became the TPF flyweight title holder.

He lost his title on August 5, 2011 at Tachi Palace Fights 10 against Ian McCall via third round submission.

Montague faced Taylor McCorriston on May 10, 2012 at Tachi Palace Fights 13. He won via TKO in the first round.

=== Vale Tudo Japan ===
Montague faced the former Shooto featherweight and bantamweight champion Mamoru Yamaguchi on December 24, 2012 at Vale Tudo Japan 2012. Montague won via split decision (28-29, 29-28, 30-27).

=== Ultimate Fighting Championship ===
In August 2013, it was announced that Montague had finally signed with the UFC. He made his promotional debut against John Dodson on October 19, 2013 at UFC 166. He lost his debut fight via knockout in 4:13 of the first round.

Montague was expected to face Will Campuzano on March 15, 2014 at UFC 171. However, Montague pulled out of the bout citing an injury and was replaced by Justin Scoggins.

Montague faced Kyoji Horiguchi on May 10, 2014 at UFC Fight Night 40. He lost the fight via unanimous decision.

Montague faced Willie Gates on July 21, 2015 at The Ultimate Fighter 21 Finale. He lost the fight via TKO in the first round. Following three consecutive losses, Montague was released from the promotion.

== Championships and accomplishments ==
=== Mixed martial arts ===
- Tachi Palace Fights
  - Tachi Palace Fights Flyweight Championship (One time)
- Gladiator Challenge
  - Gladiator Challenge Flyweight Title (One time)
- Sherdog
  - 2010 All-Violence 2nd Team
- Bas Rutten Awards
  - 2009 Bloodbath of the Year Runner-up

== Mixed martial arts record ==
Professional record breakdown
18 matches	13 wins	5 losses
By knockout	5	3
By submission	5	1
By decision	3	1

Res.	Record	Opponent	Method	Event	Date	Round	Time	Location	Notes
Loss	13–5	Willie Gates	TKO (knees to the body and elbows)	The Ultimate Fighter: American Top Team vs. Blackzilians Finale	July 12, 2015	1	1:36	Las Vegas, Nevada, United States	
Loss	13–4	Kyoji Horiguchi	Decision (unanimous)	UFC Fight Night: Brown vs. Silva	May 10, 2014	3	5:00	Cincinnati, Ohio, United States	
Loss	13–3	John Dodson	KO (punch)	UFC 166	October 19, 2013	1	4:13	Houston, Texas, United States	
Win	13–2	Jesse Miramontes	Submission (triangle choke)	Submission Championship MMA 2	May 18, 2013	1	2:22	Ontario, California, United States	
Win	12–2	Mamoru Yamaguchi	Decision (split)	Vale Tudo Japan 1st	December 24, 2012	3	5:00	Tokyo, Japan	
Win	11–2	Taylor McCorriston	TKO (punches)	Tachi Palace Fights 13	May 10, 2012	1	2:46	Lemoore, California, United States	
Win	10–2	Kenny McClairn	Submission (armbar)	Gladiator Challenge: Star Wars	April 29, 2012	2	2:41	San Jacinto, California, United States	
Loss	9–2	Ian McCall	Submission (rear-naked choke)	TPF 10: Let The Chips Fall	August 5, 2011	3	2:15	Lemoore, California, United States	Lost the TPF Flyweight Championship.
Win	9–1	Ulysses Gomez	Decision (unanimous)	TPF 8: All or Nothing	February 18, 2011	5	5:00	Lemoore, California, United States	Won the TPF Flyweight Championship.
Win	8–1	Luis Gonzalez	KO (punches)	TPF 6: High Stakes	September 9, 2010	1	4:42	Lemoore, California, United States	
Win	7–1	Jeremy Bolt	TKO (body kick)	TPF 4: Cinco de Mayhem	May 5, 2010	3	2:21	Lemoore, California, United States	
Win	6–1	Chino Nicolas	Decision (unanimous)	Gladiator Challenge: Vision Quest	February 21, 2010	3	3:00	San Jacinto, California, United States	Won the Gladiator Challenge Flyweight Championship.
Win	5–1	Joey Bedolla	Submission (rear-naked choke)	LBFN 6: Long Beach Fight Night 6	October 18, 2009	1	2:41	Long Beach, California, United States	
Win	4–1	Maurice Eazel	KO (punches)	LBFN 4: Long Beach Fight Night 4	April 19, 2009	3	0:36	Long Beach, California, United States	
Loss	3–1	Robbie Peralta	TKO (punches)	Gladiator Challenge: Warriors	February 4, 2009	3	2:55	Pauma Valley, California, United States	
Win	3–0	Scott Brommage	Submission (rear-naked choke)	LBFN 3: Long Beach Fight Night 3	January 4, 2009	3	2:36	Long Beach, California, United States	
Win	2–0	Ernie Davila	Submission (rear-naked choke)	KOW: Knights of War	September 20, 2008	2	N/A	Ensenada, Mexico	
Win	1–0	Dillion Croushorn	KO (spinning back fist)	GC 79: Genuine Beatdown	June 20, 2008	2	3:40	San Bernardino, California, United States	

== See also ==
- List of current UFC fighters
- List of male mixed martial artists
