= Tachi Palace Fights 10 =

Mixed martial arts event in 2011

TPF 10: Let the Chips Fall
- Promotion: Tachi Palace Fights
- Date: August 5, 2011
- Venue: Tachi Palace Hotel and Casino
- City: Lemoore, California

Event chronology
TPF 9: The Contenders	TPF 10: Let the Chips Fall	TPF 11: Tachi Palace Fights 11

Tachi Palace Fights 10 was a mixed martial arts event held by Tachi Palace Fights (TPF), on August 5, 2011 at the Tachi Palace Hotel and Casino in Lemoore, California.

== Background ==
Former TPF Featherweight Champion Isaac De Jesus was scheduled to take on Eddie Yagin in a bout for the vacant title, but it was announced on May 27, 2011 that former Bellator Featherweight Champion Joe Soto was to replace De Jesus because of a failed drugs test and subsequent suspension following TPF 9. The bout was still for the title.

On July 15, an undisclosed injury forced Andre Galvao out of his fight with Jorge Lopez.Strikeforce veteran David Marshall stepped in as Galvao's replacement.

TPF middleweight champion David Loiseau was originally slated to face Giva Santana, but had to pull out of the fight due to an undisclosed injury requiring surgery. Former WEC champion Doug Marshall took his place. He faced Santana in a middleweight non-title bout. The event was notable in that the free live stream provided on Sherdog.com was of unusually low quality, freezing for minutes at a time. As a result of this, a meme has started, dubbing TPF 10 as "Let the Stream Fail", rather than the events actual name,"Let the Chips Fall".

== Results ==
Main card
Weight class				Method	Round	Time	Notes
Flyweight	Ian McCall	def	Darrell Montague (c)	submission (rear naked choke)	3	2:15	(Note: For the Flyweight Championship.)
Featherweight	Eddie Yagin	def	Joe Soto	submission (guillotine choke)	1	2:00	(Note: For the Featherweight Championship.)
Flyweight	Jussier Formiga	def	Mamoru Yamaguchi	unanimous decision (30-27, 30-27, 30-27)	3	5:00
Middleweight	Giva Santana	def	Doug Marshall	submission (rear naked choke)	1	0:29
Welterweight	Jorge Lopez	def	David Marshall	TKO (retirement)	2	5:00
Bantamweight	Ulysses Gomez	def	Drew Bittner	submission (rear naked choke)	2	1:21
Catchweight (174 lb)	Kenny Ento	def	Phil Collins	KO (punches)	1	1:46
Featherweight	Brad McDonald	def	Sergio Quinones	submission (armbar)	1	3:36
Catchweight (150 lb)	Musa Toliver	def	Andy Miranda	unanimous decision (30-27, 30-27, 30-27)	3	5:00
