= Tachi Palace Fights 8 =

Mixed martial arts event in 2011

TPF 8: All or Nothing
- Promotion: Tachi Palace Fights
- Date: February 18, 2011
- Venue: Tachi Palace Hotel & Casino
- City: Lemoore, California

Event chronology
TPF 7: Tachi Palace Fights 7	TPF 8: All or Nothing	TPF 9: Tachi Palace Fights 9

Tachi Palace Fights 8 was a mixed martial arts event held by Tachi Palace Fights (TPF) on February 18, 2011, at the Tachi Palace Hotel & Casino in Lemoore, California.

== Results ==
Main card
Weight class				Method	Round	Time	Notes
PF Middleweight	David Loiseau	def	Leopoldo Serao	TKO (doctor stoppage)	5	1:12	(Note: For the TPF Middleweight Championship.)
PF Flyweight	Darrell Montague	def	Ulysses Gomez	unanimous decision (50-45, 50-45, 50-45)	3	5:00	(Note: For the TPF Flyweight Championship.)
Flyweight	Ian McCall	def	Jussier Formiga	unanimous decision (29-28, 29-28, 29-28)	3	5:00
Middleweight	Edgar Garcia	def	Mike Moreno	submission (guillotine choke)	1	1:47
Catchweight (156 lbs)	Dominique Robinson	def	John Gunderson	TKO (punches and elbows)	3	0:41
Lightweight	Fabricio Camoes	def	Steve Lopez	KO (head kick and punches)	1	0:23
Lightweight	Doug Hunt	def	Andrew Martinez	TKO (punches)	1	4:27
Lightweight	Andy Miranda	def	Ryan Burton	technical submission (triangle choke)	1	1:06
Middleweight	Collin Hart	def	Mike Arellano	submission (rear-naked choke)	1	1:32
Featherweight	Tyler Freeland	def	Diego Melendez	unanimous decision (30-27, 29-28, 29-28)	3	5:00
Middleweight	Alan Jouban	def	Kyle Griffin	KO (knee)	1	0:15
