= Giva Santana =

Brazilian mixed martial arts fighter

- Born: November 20, 1971 (age 54); São Paulo, Brazil
- Other names: The Arm Collector
- Height: 5 ft 11 in (1.80 m)
- Weight: 185 lb (84 kg; 13.2 st)
- Division: Middleweight (185 lb)
- Reach: 73.0 in (185 cm)
- Fighting out of: Irvine, California, United States
- Team: Team Oyama
- Rank: Fourth degree black belt in Brazilian Jiu-Jitsu
- Years active: 2005–2013

Mixed martial arts record
- Total: 21
- Wins: 18
- By knockout: 1
- By submission: 16
- By decision: 1
- Losses: 3
- By knockout: 1
- By decision: 2

Other information
- Website: givasantana.com
- Mixed martial arts record from Sherdog

Giva Santana (born November 20, 1971) is a Brazilian retired professional mixed martial artist, who last fought in Bellator's Middleweight division. Santana also competed in the promotions ShoXC and M-1 Global. He is a decorated jiu-jitsu competitor, both gi and no-gi, and has won numerous titles including the Pan American Championship and the No-Gi World Championship.

== Brazilian Jiu-Jitsu ==
Giva Santana has been training Brazilian jiu-jitsu for 25 years and is a fourth degree black belt under Lotus Club from São Paulo, Brazil. Santana has conquered numerous prestigious titles in Brazilian Jiu Jitsu including the Pan American Championship, World No Gi Championship, Masters World Championship, and the World Cup Championship (among others). He was awarded his black belt from Master Moises Muradi on January 23, 1999.

== Team Oyama / One Jiu-Jitsu ==
Santana was the head jiu jitsu trainer for Team Oyama where he has trained Rob Emerson, Jared Rollins, Bao Quach, and Ian McCall. He now runs his own jiu jitsu academy, One Jiu Jitsu and Fitness, located in Tustin, CA.

== Mixed martial arts career ==
Santana received the nickname "Arm Collector" because 13 out of his 18 wins are by armbar (10 of them wins in a row). He has participated in ShoXC: Elite Challenger Series.

=== Tachi Palace Fights ===
Santana was scheduled to face Ultimate Fighting Championship veteran David Loiseau at Tachi Palace Fights 10 for the Tachi Palace Fights Middleweight Championship. Loiseau pulled out of the fight due to an undisclosed injury requiring surgery, so Santana instead faced former WEC champion Doug Marshall in a middleweight non-title bout which he won by submission in the first round.

=== Bellator MMA ===
In 2011 Santana has signed with Bellator Fighting Championships. In his debut, Santana fought Darryl Cobb at Bellator 53 and won via submission in the first round.

Santana faced Bruno Santos in the quarterfinal match of Bellator season six middleweight tournament on March 16, 2012 at Bellator 61. He lost via unanimous decision.

Santana faced Brendan Sequin on November 30, 2012 at Bellator 82. Santana won via submission in the second round.

Santana faced Jason Butcher on September 7, 2013 at Bellator 98 in the quarterfinal match of Bellator Season Nine Middleweight Tournament. After dominating the first round, he was stopped for the first time in his career by TKO in the second round. Following the loss, Santana announced his retirement from MMA.

== Mixed martial arts record ==
Professional record breakdown
21 matches	18 wins	3 losses
By knockout	1	1
By submission	16	0
By decision	1	2

Res.	Record	Opponent	Method	Event	Date	Round	Time	Location	Notes
Loss	18–3	Jason Butcher	TKO (punches)	Bellator 98	September 7, 2013	2	1:12	Uncasville, Connecticut, United States	Bellator Season 9 Middleweight Tournament Quarterfinal. Announced retirement after the fight.
Win	18–2	Brendan Sequin	Submission (kneebar)	Bellator 82	November 30, 2012	2	2:33	Mt. Pleasant, Michigan, United States	
Loss	17–2	Bruno Santos	Decision (unanimous)	Bellator 61	March 16, 2012	3	5:00	Bossier City, Louisiana, United States	Bellator Season 6 Middleweight Tournament Quarterfinal
Win	17–1	Darryl Cobb	Submission (armbar)	Bellator 53	October 8, 2011	1	2:00	Miami, Oklahoma United States	Bellator debut
Win	16–1	Doug Marshall	Technical submission (rear-naked choke)	TPF 10: Let The Chips Fall	August 5, 2011	1	0:29	Lemoore, California, United States	
Win	15–1	Anthony Ruiz	Submission (armbar)	MEZ Sports: Pandemonium 3	November 19, 2010	2	4:37	Los Angeles, California, United States	
Win	14–1	Lodune Sincaid	TKO (punches)	Collision in the Cage	March 20, 2010	3	4:27	Irvine, California, United States	
Win	13–1	Radmir Gabdullin	Submission (triangle choke)	M-1 Challenge 17: Korea	July 4, 2009	1	3:47	Seoul, South Korea	
Win	12–1	Min Suk Heo	Submission (armbar)	M-1 Challenge 14: Japan	April 29, 2009	1	4:05	Tokyo, Japan	
Loss	11–1	Jaime Jara	Decision (split)	ShoXC: Elite Challenger Series	September 26, 2008	3	5:00	Santa Ynez, California, United States	
Win	11–0	Matt Lucas	Submission (armbar)	ShoXC: Elite Challenger Series	April 5, 2008	1	1:49	Friant, California, United States	
Win	10–0	Jaime Fletcher	Submission (armbar)	ShoXC: Elite Challenger Series	October 26, 2007	1	2:46	Santa Ynez, California, United States	
Win	9–0	Aram Ghukasyan	Submission (armbar)	Independent Event	May 3, 2007	1	1:45	Highland, California, United States	
Win	8–0	Chris Ledwidge	Submission (armbar)	Battle in the Ballroom 1	April 1, 2007	1	0:51	Orange County, California, United States	
Win	7–0	Michele Verginelli	Submission (armbar)	Fury FC 2: Final Combat	November 30, 2006	1	4:20	São Paulo, Brazil	
Win	6–0	Boris Jonstomp	Submission (armbar)	Fury FC 1: Warlords Unleashed	September 27, 2006	1	2:00	São Paulo, Brazil	
Win	5–0	Mavrick Harvey	Submission (armbar)	Invincible: Fist of Fury	June 17, 2006	1	2:00	Ontario, California, United States	
Win	4–0	Jun Soo Lim	Submission (armbar)	WXF: X-Impact World Championships	July 9, 2005	1	2:34	Korea	
Win	3–0	Edwin Aguilar	Submission (armbar)	WXF: X-Impact World Championships	July 9, 2005	1	2:11	Korea	
Win	2–0	Zamirbek Syrgabayev	Submission (armbar)	WXF: X-Impact World Championships	July 9, 2005	1	2:54	Korea	
Win	1–0	Noriki Miyashita	Decision (unanimous)	WXF: X-Impact World Championships	July 9, 2005	1	5:00	Korea	
