= Tachi Palace Fights =

MMA promoter based in Lemoore, California

- Industry: Mixed martial arts promotion
- Founded: 2009
- Headquarters: Lemoore, California, United States

Tachi Palace Fights (TPF) is an American mixed martial arts (MMA) promotion which hosted events at the Tachi Palace Hotel & Casino in Lemoore, California. Matchmaker for TPF was former fighter Richard Goodman.

Regarded as a regional promotion, TPF events often included upcoming MMA prospects and veteran fighters who had competed in organizations such as the UFC, WEC, and Strikeforce, as well as other regional MMA promotions. The promotion was discontinued first in December 2012. However, the tribal council reversed their decision in March 2013 and the TPF returned in August of that year. Tachi Palace Fights would cease operations again in late 2018.

== History ==
Tachi Palace Fights began hosting events at the Tachi Palace Hotel & Casino in 2009 after the resort ceased its relationship with Palace Fighting Championship (PFC). Despite the change in promotion, many of the same local California fighters that competed for PFC were on the early TPF cards.

Tachi Palace Fights 1 featured then Bellator featherweight champion Joe Soto, fellow Bellator veteran Ulysses Gomez, and WEC standout Chad Mendes. Also on the card, The Ultimate Fighter 6 alum Jon Koppenhaver lost a split decision to prospect David Mitchell, as well as The Ultimate Fighter 14 veteran Steven Siler.

TPF 2: Brawl in the Hall saw David Mitchell return to defeat King of the Cage and Affliction: Day of Reckoning veteran Bobby Green by submission via toe hold, while UFC veteran Diego Saraiva won against Eddie Yagin via technical knockout. Meanwhile, Anthony Ruiz took a unanimous decision over French UFC veteran Xavier Foupa-Pokam. Cyrille Diabate submitted Rob Smith via rear naked choke in his final fight before beginning his stint with the UFC.

On February 4, 2010, Tachi Palace Fights hosted a thirteen fight event named TPF 3: Champions Collide. WEC and Dream competitor Cole Escovedo won the TPF bantamweight title by defeating Jeff Bedard via triangle choke. TUF 12 alum Nam Phan was knocked out by Isaac DeJesus in a bout for the TPF featherweight title. Bellator female champion Zoila Frausto appeared, submitting boxer Jessica Rakoczy via armbar. Anthony Ruiz scored another impressive victory, defeating UFC veteran Hector Ramirez via split decision.

TPF 4: Cinco de Mayhem occurred on May 5, 2010, and featured a flyweight bout between Ulysses Gomez and Luis Gonzalez. Gomez won the bout via unanimous decision, capturing the promotion's newly introduced flyweight title. In the welterweight class, prospect David Mitchell submitted UFC and WEC veteran Tim McKenzie with a guillotine choke to win the TPF welterweight title.

TPF 5: Stars and Strikes occurred on July 9, 2010, The event was headlined by a 160-pound catchweight fight between WEC veteran Rob McCullough and TPF featherweight champion Isaac DeJesus. McCullough won the bout via technical knockout in the first round. Prospect Michael McDonald knocked out Cole Escovedo to secure the TPF bantamweight title. Veteran fighter John Alessio put War Machine to sleep with a guillotine choke in their welterweight contest, while David Mitchell returned to defeat local journeyman Poppies Martinez with a triangle choke.

TPF 6: High Stakes happened on the night of September 9, 2010. The event featured a middleweight bout between former WEC light heavyweight champion Doug Marshall and TUF 11 alum Kyacey Uscola. Uscola knocked Marshall out with punches during the first round. Also featured was a lightweight bout between Rob McCullough and The Ultimate Fighter 5 alum Corey Hill, which McCullough won via unanimous decision. Leopoldo Serao claimed the TPF middleweight title in a bout against Anthony Ruiz, while veterans Micah Miller and Diego Saraiva squared off in a bout which Miller took by unanimous decision.

TPF 7: Deck the Halls occurred on December 2, 2010.

In the main event, Brazilian journeyman Jorge Oliveira defeated UFC veteran James Irvin via triangle choke in a middleweight contest. Micah Miller submitted TPF featherweight champion Isaac DeJesus via neck crank. DeJesus retained his title, however, as Miller came into the bout two pounds over the featherweight limit. John Alessio defeated Phil Collins to win the TPF welterweight title, vacated by prospect David Mitchell when he was signed by the UFC. Flyweight ace Jussier da Silva defeated Danny Martinez via unanimous decision in his first North American bout.

TPF 8: All or Nothing took place on February 18, 2011.

In the nights main event former UFC middleweight contender David Loiseau won the TPF middleweight title by defeating Leopoldo Serao by TKO (cut) early in the 5th round. Little action took place in the bout before Loiseau landed the fight ending blow. In other action Darrell Montague put on a sensational performance by out pointing Ulysses Gomez and winning the TPF flyweight title by unanimous. Also on the card the world's No. 1 ranked flyweight in the world was not able to back up that claim as he lost a unanimous decision to recently turned flyweight Ian McCall. Also on the card Dominique Robinson battered John Gunderson to a third round tko victory, Edgar Garcia submitted Mike Moreno in the first round, UFC vet Fabricio Camoes defeated another UFC vet Steve lopez by tko in the first round after he landed a head kick. Doug Hunt defeated local favorite Andrew "Mickey D" Martinez by tko in the first round. Late replacement Andy Miranda beat Ryan Burton by submission due to a triangle choke in the first round, Collin Hart submitted journeyman Mike Arellano in the first round by rear naked choke, Tyler Freeland took a decision over Diego Melendez, and in the opening fight of the night Alan Jouban knocked out Tyson Griffin's brother Kyle Griffin 14 seconds into the very first round.

TPF 9: The Contenders

TPF 10: Let The Chips Fall

== TPF 11: Redemption ==
was held on December 2, 2011

- Featherweight Championship bout: Georgi Karakhanyan def. Isaac De Jesus (Vacant Title)
- Bantamweight Championship bout: Ulysses Gomez def. Cody Gibson (Vacant Title)
- Flyweight bout: Dustin Ortiz def. Josh Rave by TKO (doctor stoppage) Rd 3 (4:38)
- Welterweight bout: Phil Collins def. Andrew Martinez by submission (guillotine) Rd 1 (0:49)
- Bantamweight bout: Francisco Rivera def. Brad McDonald by KO (punch) Rd 1 (0:40)
- Lightweight bout: Savant Young def. Robert Washington by submission (guillotine) Rd 2 (2:41)
- Lightweight bout: Bubba Jenkins def. Josh Williams by submission (strikes) Rd 1 (2:04)
- Flyweight bout: Anthony Figueroa def. Paul Ruiz by unanimous decision (30-27, 30–27, 30–27)
- Featherweight bout: Jesse Bowen def. Sergio Quinones by unanimous decision (30-27, 30–27, 29–28)
- Flyweight bout: Edgar Diaz def. Alex Perez by submission (guillotine) Rd 1 (0:43)
- Heavyweight bout: Javier Ayala def. Freddie Aquitania by split decision (29-28, 28–29, 29–28)

== TPF 12: Second Coming ==
was held on March 9, 2012

- Bantamweight bout: Casey Olson def. Cody Gibson by unanimous decision
- Lightweight bout: Rob Emerson def. Savant Young by submission (rear naked choke) Rd 3 (4:29)
- Bantamweight bout: Francisco Rivera def. Antonio Duarte by KO (punches) Rd 1 (1:15)
- Lightweight bout: Bubba Jenkins def. Chris Gomez by submission (rear naked choke) Rd 1 (2:07)
- Heavyweight bout: Dave Huckaba def. Liron Wilson by TKO (punches) Rd 2 (1:05)
- Featherweight bout: Anthony Avila def. Art Becerra by submission (guillotine choke) Rd 1 (4:08)
- Flyweight bout: Alex Perez def. Edgar Diaz by submission (kimura)Rd 1 (2:33)

== TPF 13: Unfinished Business ==
was held on May 10, 2012

- Bantamweight bout: Joe Soto def. Chad George by submission (rear naked choke) Rd 2 (2:01)
- Bantamweight Championship bout: Ian Loveland def. Alexander Crispim by KO (knee) Rd 1 (4:23) (Vacant title)
- Welterweight bout: Chidi Njokuani def. John Reedy by TKO (strikes) Rd 1 (0:55)
- Welterweight bout: Tony Llamas def. Poppies Martinez by submission (guillotine) Rd 1 (1:00)
- Lightweight bout: Art Arciniega def. Sergio Cortez by unanimous decision (29-28, 29–28, 30–27)
- Flyweight bout: Darrell Montague def. Taylor McCorriston by TKO (strikes) Rd 1 (2:46)
- Flyweight bout: Andrew Valladerez def. Martin Sandoval by submission (guillotine) Rd 3 (1:52)
- Bantamweight bout: Paul Ruiz def. Ruben Trujillo by TKO (punches) Rd 1 (1:13)

== TPF 14: Validation ==
was held on September 7, 2012

- Bantamweight Championship bout: Ian Loveland (c) def. Casey Olson by KO (head kick and punches) Rd 1 (0:38)
- Featherweight Championship bout: Georgi Karakhanyan (c) def. Micah Miller by unanimous decision
- Featherweight bout: Art Arciniega def. Brad McDonald by split decision (29-28, 28–29, 29–28)
- Featherweight bout: Andre Fili def. Ricky Wallace by Technical Submission (armbar) Rd 2 (4:08)
- Lightweight bout: Poppies Martinez def Jason Drake by Submission (heel hook) Rd 1 (1:48)
- Bantamweight bout: Rolando Velasco def. Antonio Duarte by Technical Submission (guillotine choke) Rd 1 (2:57)
- Featherweight bout: Anthony Avila def. Sergio Quinones by Submission (guillotine choke) Rd 1 (3:03)
- Light Heavyweight bout: Angel DeAnda def. Drew Montgomery by TKO (punches) Rd 1 (4:30)
- Bantamweight bout: Alex Perez def. Javier Galas by Submission (rear naked choke) Rd 1 (1:37)
- Welterweight bout: Zeth Martin def. David Bollea by TKO (punches) Rd 2 (0:59)
- Women's Flyweight bout: Jessica Rakoczy def. Kristen Gatz by TKO (punches) Rd 1 (2:19)

== TPF 15: Collision Course ==
was held on November 15, 2012

- Bantamweight bout: Rolando Velasco def. Carson Beebe by Unanimous Decision
- Featherweight bout: Anthony Avila def. Darren Crisp by Submission (guillotine choke) Rd 1 (1:08)
- Lightweight bout: Poppies Martinez def. Fernando Bernstein by Unanimous Decision
- Catchweight bout (151 lbs.): Andre Fili def. Enoch Wilson by Unanimous Decision
- Featherweight bout: Art Arciniega def. Alexander Crispim by Unanimous Decision
- Heavyweight bout: Freddie Aquitania def. Javy Ayala by Split Decision
- Bantamweight bout: Alex Perez def. Carlos De Soto by TKO (punches) Rd 1 (1:52)
- Lightweight bout: Dominic Clark def. Andy Miranda by TKO (punches) Rd 1 (1:50)

== TPF 16: The Return ==
was held on August 22, 2013

- Vacant Lightweight Championship bout: Poppies Martinez def. Christos Giagos by Submission (guillotine choke) Rd 1 (4:27)
- Vacant Featherweight Championship bout: Art Arciniega def. Marcello Cassero by Decision (split) Rd 5 (5:00)
- Lightweight bout: Isaac DeJesus def. Darren Crisp by TKO (punches) Rd 1 (2:20)
- Welterweight bout: Ricky Legere def. Joey Cabezas by Submission (armbar) Rd 1 (3:22)
- Bantamweight bout: Rolando Velasco def. Alex Rojas by Submission (rear naked choke) Rd 3 (2:51)
- Featherweight bout: Alexander Crispim def. Sergio Quinones by Submission (armbar) Rd 2 (1:48)
- Heavyweight bout: Manuel Quezada def. Robert Michael by KO (punch) Rd 1 (0:10)
- Lightweight bout: Cain Carrizosa def. Cody Orrison by Decision (unanimous) Rd 3 (5:00)
- Flyweight bout: Anthony Figueroa def. Jimmy Grant by Decision (unanimous) Rd 3 (5:00)
- Bantamweight bout: Alex Perez def. Jeff Carson by Submission (standing guillotine choke) Rd 1 (0:48)

== TPF 17: Fall Brawl ==
was held on November 14, 2013

- Interim Bantamweight Championship bout: Russell Doane def. Jared Papazian by KO (elbows) Rd 4 (2:30)
- Vacant Welterweight Championship bout: Nate Loughran def. Kito Andrews by Decision (unanimous) Rd 5 (5:00)
- Bantamweight bout: Jeremiah Labiano def. Adam Calderon by Submission (triangle choke) Rd 1 (3:30)
- Bantamweight bout: Joe Soto def. Cory Vom Baur by Submission (guillotine choke) Rd 1 (4:36)
- Welterweight bout: Randall Wallace def. Kenny Ento by Decision (unanimous) Rd 3 (5:00)
- Featherweight bout: Cody Gibson def. Evan Esguerra by Decision (unanimous) Rd 3 (5:00)
- Heavyweight bout: Manuel Quezada def. Jerod Brown by TKO (punches) Rd 1 (1:18)
- Lightweight bout: Darren Crisp def. Ryan Reneau by Submission (triangle choke) Rd 1 (2:18)
- Women's Featherweight bout: Marion Reneau def. Leslie Rodriguez by TKO (punches) Rd 1 (1:24)

== TPF 18: Martinez vs. Culley ==
was held on February 6, 2014

- Vacant Featherweight Championship bout: Poppies Martinez def. Chris Culley by Submission (anaconda choke) Rd 1 (3:31)
- Vacant Bantamweight Championship bout: Joe Soto def. Jeremiah Labiano by TKO (doctor stoppage) Rd 3 (4:16)
- Middleweight bout: Buddy Wallace def. Joey Cabezas by Submission (triangle choke) Rd 1 (4:33)
- Lightweight bout: Cain Carrizosa def. Chris Quitiquit by KO (punch) Rd 1 (0:30)
- Heavyweight bout: Jack May def. Carl Seumanutafa by TKO (headkick & punches) Rd 1 (2:57)
- Flyweight bout: Luis Gonzalez def. Damon Wood by KO (punches) Rd 1 (1:39)
- Light Heavyweight bout: Micky Martinez def. William Johnson by Submission (neck crank) Rd 1 (2:13)
- Flyweight bout: Hector Sandoval def. Benny Vinson by Decision (unanimous) Rd 3 (5:00)
- Flyweight bout: Alex Perez def. Eloy Garza by Decision (unanimous) Rd 3 (5:00)
- Bantamweight bout: Thomas Vasquez def. Alex Rojas by Submission (rear naked choke) Rd 1 (4:23)

== TPF 19: Throwback Thursday ==
- Vacant Lightweight Championship: Christos Giagos def. Sevak Magakian by submission (triangle choke) Rd 1 (4:45)
- Adrian Diaz def. Olaf Alfonso by TKO (strikes) Rd 3 (2:35)
- Max Griffin def. Randall Wallace by submission (rear naked choke) R2 (2:20)
- Diego Saraiva def. Eddie Yagin by decision (unanimous)
- Josue Lugo vs Andrew Martinez declared a no-contest (accidental eye poke) R1 (2:02)
- Castle Williams def. Cameron Ramirez by KO (spinning back kick to the body) R1 (3:29)
- Alex Perez def. Del Hawkins by TKO (strikes) R1 (2:23)
- Kelly McGill def. Leslie Rodriguez by TKO (strikes) R1 (1:33)
- Josh Powell def. Jerod Brown by decision (unanimous)
- Rodrigo Vargas Mejia def. Jordan Williams by R1 TKO (doctor stoppage) R1 (5:00)
- Hector Alatore def. Justin Santistevan by decision (unanimous)

== TPF 20: Night of Champions ==
- Bantamweight Championship: Joe Soto def. Terrion Ware by submission (north south choke) R3 submission (2:48)
- Welterweight Championship: Ricky Legere def. Nate Loughran by submission (rear naked choke) R3 (2:51)
- Joby Sanchez def. Antonio Banuelos by TKO (corner stoppage) R2 (2:41)
- Flyweight Championship: Hector Sandoval def. Ryan Hollis by decision (unanimous)
- Castle Williams def. Drake Boen by submission (arm triangle choke) R2
- Josue Lugo def. Manuel Quezada by submission R1 (:34)
- Angel DeAnda def. Matt Lagler by TKO (strikes) R1 (4:54)
- Josh Powell def. Mike Martin by TKO (strikes) R1 (0:12)
- Alberto Arreola def. Victor Tubera by submission (rear naked choke) R1 (1:56)
- Zeth Martin def. Kevin Koy by TKO (strikes) R1 (0:47)

== TPF 21: All or Nothing ==
- Welterweight Championship: Max Griffin def. Ricky Legere (c) by KO (punch) R1
- Flyweight Championship: Willie Gates def. Hector Sandoval (c) by TKO (punches) R1
- Adrian Diaz def. Isaac DeJesus by TKO (punches) R3
- Anthony Figueroa def. Luis Gonzalez by Decision (unanimous) R3
- Rolando Velasco def. Sergio Cortez by Technical Submission (arm-triangle choke) R1
- Mario Soto def. Dominic Clark by TKO (punches) R2
- Tony Llamas def. Alexander Crispim by TKO (doctor stoppage) R2
- J.C. Llamas def. Kenny Ento by Submission (exhaustion) R2
- Mike Olson def. Anthony Torres by Submission (guillotine choke) R1
- Alex Barajas def. Evan Solorio by Submission (triangle choke) R2
- Art Hernandez def. Joshua LaGrange by TKO (strikes) R2

== TPF 22: Champions Collide 2 ==
- Non title Main Event Bantamweight bout: Fabiano Silva Da Conceicao def. Rolando Velasco
- Vacant Flyweight Championship: Alex Perez def. Anthony Figueroa
- Vacant Middleweight Championship: David Mitchell def. Angel DeAnda
- Lightweight bout: Tony Llamas def. Sergio Cortez
- Featherweight bout: Brandon Cohea def. Castle Williams
- Lightweight bout: Enoch Wilson def. Diego Saraiva

== TPF 23: Cinco de Mayhem ==
- Welterweight Championship: Chidi Njokuani def. Max Griffin (c)
- Bantamweight bout: Rolando Velasco def. Jared Papazian
- Lightweight bout: John Reedy def. Ray Cervera
- Women's Strawweight bout: Jaimee Nievera def. Kameron Perkins
- Lightweight bout: Dominic Clark def. Charles Diaz
- Bantamweight bout: Josh San Diego def. Richard Parra III
- Heavyweight bout: Justin Jones def. Mike Morales
- Bantamweight bout: Joe Barajas def. Aaron Arana
- Featherweight bout: Drake Boen def. Samuel Alvarez
- Featherweight bout: Jamall Emmers def. Merwyn Rivera
- Lightweight bout: Art Hernandez def. Victor Tubera
- Flyweight bout: Abel Garcia def. Anthony Torres

== TPF 24: Summer Brawl ==
- Vacant Bantamweight Championship: Rolando Velasco def. Josh San Diego
- Non Title Flyweight bout: Alex Perez (c) def. Martin Sandoval
- Bantamweight bout: Ricky Simon def. Jeremiah Labiano
- Lightweight bout: Tony Llamas def. Jeff Carson
- Lightweight bout: Jonathan Contrestano def. Ryan Reneau
- Featherweight bout: Drake Boen def. Merwyn Rivera
- Featherweight bout: Evan Solorio def. Edgar Loza
- Featherweight bout: Kyle Reyes def. Jordan Bailey
- Flyweight bout: Richard Alarcon def. Aaron Cohea

== TPF 25: Fall Brawl ==
- Flyweight Championship: Adam Antolin def. Alex Perez (c) by Submission (prayer choke)
- Vacant Lightweight Championship: Tony Llamas def. Dominic Clark by TKO (ground and pound)
- Lightweight bout: Danny Navarro def. Cain Carrizosa by Decision (unanimous)
- Featherweight bout: Chris Culley def. Kyle Reyes by Decision (unanimous)
- Featherweight bout: Drake Boen def. Brandon Cohea by Decision (unanimous)
- Lightweight bout: Jamall Emmers def. Ray Cervera by Decision (unanimous)
- Lightweight bout: Samuel Alvarez def. Evan Solorio by Decision (unanimous)
- Lightweight bout: Art Hernandez def. Michael Pinon by Submission (rear naked choke)
- Lightweight bout: Jordan Williams def. Preston Scharf by Submission (rear naked choke)
- Bantamweight bout: Sergio Cortez def. Jeff Carson Submission (guillotine choke)
- Flyweight bout: Casey Kenney def. Victor Rosas by TKO (doctor stoppage)

== TPF 26: Brawl in the Hall ==
- Bantamweight Championship: Rolando Velasco (c) def. Joe Neal by Decision (unanimous)
- Lightweight bout: Danny Navarro def. Cleber Luciano by TKO (punches)
- Women's Flyweight bout: Zoila Frausto def. Corina Herrera by Decision (unanimous)
- Lightweight bout: Cain Carrizosa def. Rey Cervera by Decision (unanimous)
- Flyweight bout: Hector Sandoval def. Martin Sandoval by Decision (unanimous)
- Lightweight bout: Drakkar Klose vs. Joshua Aveles ended in a Split Draw
- Featherweight bout: C. Buron Navarro def. Deven Ortiz by Submission (guillotine choke)
- Flyweight bout: Casey Kenney def. Anthony Torres by Submission (armbar)
- Lightweight bout: Danny Ramirez def. Samuel Alvarez by Decision (unanimous)

== TPF 27: Mayhem ==
- Bantamweight Championship: Cody Gibson def. Rolando Velasco (c) by Decision (unanimous)
- Vacant Featherweight Championship: Adrian Diaz def. Andres Quintana by TKO (body kick and punches)
- Bantamweight bout: Jared Papazian def. Alex Perez by Submission (armbar)
- Middleweight bout: Angel DeAnda def. Justin Baesman by TKO (punches)
- Lightweight bout: Evan Solorio def. Armando Perez by KO (punch)
- Bantamweight bout: Richard Parra III def. Trey Branch by TKO (body kick and punches)
- Featherweight bout: Kyle Reyes def. Stephen Cervantes by Submission (neck crank)
- Featherweight bout: Sergio Quinones def. Adam Calderon by Submission (rear-naked choke)
- Flyweight bout: Casey Kenney def. Angel Hernandez by Submission (D'Arce choke)

== TPF 28: Hot ==
- Vacant Lightweight Championship: Danny Navarro def. Brian Cobb by Submission (guillotine choke)
- Lightweight bout: Cain Carrizosa def. Matt Hagge by Submission (armbar)
- Bantamweight bout: Martin Day def. Richard Parra III by Decision (split)
- Women's Flyweight bout: Sheila Padilla def. Corina Herrera by Decision (unanimous)
- Bantamweight bout: Kyle Reyes def. Josh San Diego by Submission (10 finger guillotine choke)
- Welterweight bout: JC Llamas def. Zane Kamaka by Submission (verbal)
- Light Heavyweight bout: Mitchell Sipe def. Joseph Ramirez by KO/TKO (ground and pound)
- Lightweight bout: Armando Espinoza def. Victor Rico by KO/TKO (punches)

== TPF 29: Fall Brawl ==
- Bantamweight Championship: Cody Gibson (c) def. Kyle Reyes by KO/TKO (punches)
- Non Title Featherweight bout: Adrian Diaz (c) def. Emilio Chavez by Submission (guillotine choke)
- Featherweight bout: Castle Williams def. Victor Rico by KO/TKO (knees & punches)
- Featherweight bout: Chase Gibson def. Adam Calderon by Decision (unanimous)
- Middleweight bout: Justin Jones def. Joey Cabezas by KO/TKO (ground and pound)
- 160lbs Catchweight bout: Nick Bustamante def. Nick Vanderpool by Submission (rear naked choke)
- Heavyweight bout: Van Palacio def. Rafael del Real by KO/TKO (leg injury)
- Lightweight bout: Joshua Aveles def. Brandon Ricetti by KO/TKO (punches)

== TPF 30: Navarro vs. Carrizosa II ==
- Lightweight non-title bout: Cain Carrizosa def. Danny Navarro (c) by Decision (unanimous)
- Flyweight Championship: Casey Kenney def. Alvin Cacdac by Submission (rear naked choke)
- Featherweight bout: Sergio Quinones def. Castle Williams by Submission (brabo choke)
- Lightweight bout: Salvador Becerra def. Nick Bustamante by TKO (doctor stoppage)
- Bantamweight bout: Alex Perez def. Andrew Natividad by Submission (brabo choke)
- Heavyweight bout: Van Palacio vs. Josh Powell by NC (accidental eye poke)
- Flyweight bout: Jesus Vargas Aguila def. Anthony Castrejon by Submission (rear naked choke)
- Bantamweight bout: Holt Felkins def. Victor Gallegos by TKO (knee & punches)

== TPF 31: Diaz vs. Gibson ==
- Featherweight Championship: Adrian Diaz (c) def. Cody Gibson (c, Bantamweight) by Submission (guillotine choke)
- Welterweight bout: Buddy Wallace def. JC Llamas by KO/TKO (doctor stoppage due to cut)
- Bantamweight bout: Joe Neal def. Alex Rojas by KO/TKO (punches)
- Featherweight bout: Tyler Diamond def. Nathan Stolen by Decision (unanimous)
- Heavyweight bout: Chris Lewis def. Van Michael Palacio by KO/TKO (punches)
- Lightweight bout: Jalin Turner def. Paradise Vaovasa by KO/TKO (knees to the body)
- Featherweight bout: Armando Espinoza def. Diamond Templeton by Submission (triangle choke)
- Heavyweight bout: Mohammad Usman def. Derrick Williams by Submission (kimura)
- Light Heavyweight bout: Angel Deanda def. Mike Morales by KO/TKO (punches)

== TPF 32: Ruiz vs. Cabezas ==
- Lightweight bout: Anthony Avila def. Ray Cervera by Submission (heel hoke)
- 165 lbs catchweight bout: Salvador Becerra def. Robby Ostovich by KO/TKO (elbows & punches)
- Bantamweight bout: Mario Bautista def. Devon Chavez by Submission (d'arce choke)
- Lightweight bout: Armando Espinoza def. Ysidro Gutierrez by Submission (rear naked choke)
- Lightweight bout: Te'Jovan Edwards def. Thomas Diagne by KO/TKO (head kick & punches)
- Heavyweight bout: Mohammed Usman def. Dante Harrell by Submission (kimura)

== TPF 33: Velasco vs. Lima ==
- Bantamweight Championship: Rodrigo Lima def. Rolando Velasco by Submission (guillotine choke)
- Lightweight bout: Tony Llamas def. Sergio Quinones by KO/TKO (punches)
- Heavyweight bout: Mitchell Sipe def. Chris Lewis by KO/TKO (punches & knees)
- 180lbs Catchweight bout: Evan Solorio def. Garrett Marks by KO/TKO (punches)
- Heavyweight bout: Mohammed Usman def. Van Palacio by KO/TKO (punches)
- Lightweight bout: Ysidro Gutierrez def. Art Hernandez by Decision (unanimous)
- Bantamweight bout: Fard Muhammad def. Drake Boen by Decision (unanimous)
- Bantamweight bout: Jose Avalos def. Devon Chavez by KO/TKO (doctor stoppage)
- Welterweight bout: Lamar Reed def. Ray Cervera by Decision (unanimous)

== TPF 34: Sipe vs. Lewis ==
- Heavyweight Championship: Mitchell Sipe def. Chris Lewis by KO/TKO
- Lightweight bout: Arturo Hernandez def. Armando Espinoza by Decision (unanimous)
- Bantamweight bout: Nohelin Hernandez def. Joe Neal by Decision (split)
- Welterweight bout: Randall Wallace vs. Otgonbaatar Nergui ended in a draw
- Bantamweight bout: Jose Avalos def. Matt Perez by Submission (armbar)
- Flyweight bout: Carlos Hernandez def. Ryan Attebery by Submission (rear naked choke)
- Lightweight bout: Art Arciniega def. Ray Cervera by Decision (split)
- Welterweight bout: Fabian Luevano def. Garrett Marks by Decision (unanimous)
- Featherweight bout: Diamond Templeton def. Ysidro Gutierrez by Submission (rear naked choke)
- Heavyweight bout: Rudolph Buendia def. Van Michael Palacio by Submission (arm triangle choke)

== TPF 35: Hernandez vs. Reyes ==
- Bantamweight bout: Nohelin Hernandez def. Kyle Reyes by Decision (split)
- Lightweight bout: Anthony Avila def. Marcello Cassero by KO/TKO
- Bantamweight bout: Jose Avalos def. Francisco Loredo by Submission (rear naked choke)
- Heavyweight bout: Sean Johnson def. Rudy Buendia by KO/TKO
- Welterweight bout: Evan Solorio def. Aaron Hamilton by KO/TKO
- Flyweight bout: Anthony Aguilar def. Carlos Hernandez by Decision (unanimous)
- Lightweight bout: Mike Bravo def. Art Hernandez by Decision (unanimous)
- Lightweight bout: Christian Avalos def. Henry Mendez by Submission (rear naked choke)
- Welterweight bout: Juan Villarreal def. Fabian Luevano by KO/TKO

== Past events ==
#	Event	Date	Venue	Location
37	TPF 36: Souza vs. Almelik	May 16, 2026	Tachi Palace	Lemoore, California
36	TPF 35: Hernandez vs. Reyes	Nov 9, 2018	Tachi Palace	Lemoore, California
35	TPF 34: Sipe vs. Lewis	Mar 29, 2018	Tachi Palace	Lemoore, California
34	TPF 33: Velasco vs. Lima	Nov 2, 2017	Tachi Palace	Lemoore, California
33	TPF 32: Ruiz vs. Cabezas	Aug 3, 2017	Tachi Palace	Lemoore, California
32	TPF 31: Diaz vs. Gibson	May 18, 2017	Tachi Palace	Lemoore, California
31	TPF 30: Navarro vs. Carrizosa II	February 2, 2017	Tachi Palace	Lemoore, California
30	TPF 29: Fall Brawl	November 3, 2016	Tachi Palace	Lemoore, California
29	TPF 28: Hot	August 4, 2016	Tachi Palace	Lemoore, California
28	TPF 27: Mayhem	May 19, 2016	Tachi Palace	Lemoore, California
27	TPF 26: Brawl in the Hall	February 18, 2016	Tachi Palace	Lemoore, California
26	TPF 25: Fall Brawl	November 19, 2015	Tachi Palace	Lemoore, California
25	TPF 24: Summer Brawl	August 6, 2015	Tachi Palace	Lemoore, California
24	TPF 23: Cinco De Mayhem	May 7, 2015	Tachi Palace	Lemoore, California
23	TPF 22: Champions Collide 2	February 5, 2015	Tachi Palace	Lemoore, California
22	TPF 21: All or Nothing	November 6, 2014	Tachi Palace	Lemoore, California
21	TPF 20: Night of Champions	August 7, 2014	Tachi Palace	Lemoore, California
20	TPF 19: Throwback Thursday	June 19, 2014	Tachi Palace	Lemoore, California
19	TPF 18: Martinez vs. Culley	February 6, 2014	Tachi Palace	Lemoore, California
18	TPF 17: Fall Brawl	November 14, 2013	Tachi Palace	Lemoore, California
17	TPF 16: The Return	August 22, 2013	Tachi Palace	Lemoore, California
16	TPF 15: Collision Course	November 15, 2012	Tachi Palace	Lemoore, California
15	TPF 14: Validation	September 7, 2012	Tachi Palace	Lemoore, California
14	TPF 13: Unfinished Business	May 10, 2012	Tachi Palace	Lemoore, California
13	TPF 12: Second Coming	March 9, 2012	Tachi Palace	Lemoore, California
12	TPF 11: Redemption	December 2, 2011	Tachi Palace	Lemoore, California
11	TPF 10: Let The Chips Fall	August 5, 2011	Tachi Palace	Lemoore, California
10	TPF 9: The Contenders	May 6, 2011	Tachi Palace	Lemoore, California
9	TPF 8: All or Nothing	February 18, 2011	Tachi Palace	Lemoore, California
8	TPF 7: Deck the Halls	December 2, 2010	Tachi Palace	Lemoore, California
7	TPF 6: High Stakes	September 9, 2010	Tachi Palace	Lemoore, California
6	TPF 5: Stars and Strikes	July 9, 2010	Tachi Palace	Lemoore, California
5	TPF 4: Cinco de Mayhem	May 5, 2010	Tachi Palace	Lemoore, California
4	TPF 3: Champions Collide	February 4, 2010	Tachi Palace	Lemoore, California
3	TPF 2: Brawl in the Hall	December 3, 2009	Tachi Palace	Lemoore, California
2	TPF 1: Tachi Palace Fights 1	October 8, 2009	Tachi Palace	Lemoore, California
1	TPF: Best of Both Worlds	July 16, 2009	Tachi Palace	Lemoore, California

== Current champions ==
Division	Champion	Since	Defenses
Heavyweight	(United States) Mitchell Sipe	March 29, 2018	0
Light Heavyweight	Vacant	March 2013	
Middleweight	(United States) David Mitchell	February 5, 2015	0
Welterweight	Vacant	June 19, 2015	
Lightweight	(United States) Danny Navarro	August 4, 2016	0
Featherweight	(United States) Adrian Diaz	May 19, 2016	1
Bantamweight	(United States) Cody Gibson	May 19, 2016	1
Flyweight	(United States) Casey Kenney	February 2, 2017	0

== Title history ==
=== Heavyweight Championship ===
265 lbs (120 kg)

No.	Name	Event	Date	Defenses
1	(United States) Mitchell Sipe def. Chris Lewis	TPF 34: Sipe vs. Lewis; Lemoore, CA, United States	March 29, 2018	

=== Light Heavyweight Championship ===
186 to 205 lbs (84 to 93 kg)

No.	Name	Event	Date	Defenses
1	(United States) Angel De Anda def. Anthony Ruiz	TPF 15: Collision Course; Lemoore, CA, United States	November 15, 2012	
De Anda's title was rescinded when the promotion suspended operations in December 2012. When it restarted in March 2013, there was no indication that De Anda's title had been restored and a light heavyweight title fight has not been scheduled since.

=== Middleweight Championship ===
171 to 185 lbs (77 to 84 kg)

No.	Name	Event	Date	Defenses
1	(Brazil) Leopoldo Serao def. Anthony Ruiz	TPF 6: High Stakes; Lemoore, CA, United States	September 9, 2010	
2	(Canada) David Loiseau def. Leopoldo Serao	TPF 8: All or Nothing; Lemoore, CA, United States	February 18, 2011	
Loiseau was stripped of the title in December of 2014 when TPF announced an upcoming vacant championship fight.
3	(United States) David Mitchell def. Angel DeAnda	Tachi Palace Fights 22; Lemoore, CA, United States	February 5, 2015	

=== Welterweight Championship ===
156 to 170 lbs (70 to 77 kg)

No.	Name	Event	Date	Defenses
1	(United States) David Mitchell def. Tim McKenzie	TPF 4: Cinco de Mayhem; Lemoore, CA, United States	May 5, 2010	1. def. Poppies Martinez at TPF 5: Stars and Strikes on Jul 9, 2010
Mitchell vacated the title when he left TPF for the UFC.
2	(Canada) John Alessio def. Phil Collins	TPF 7: Deck the Halls; Lemoore, CA, United States	December 2, 2010	
Alessio vacated the title when he left the promotion.
3	(United States) Nate Loughran def. Kito Andrews	TPF 17: Fall Brawl; Lemoore, CA, United States	November 14, 2013	
4	(United States) Ricky Legere def. Nate Loughran	TPF 20: Night of Champions; Lemoore, CA, United States	August 7, 2014	
5	(United States) Max Griffin def. Ricky Legere	TPF 21: All or Nothing; Lemoore, CA, United States	November 6, 2014	
6	(United States) Chidi Njokuani def. Max Griffin	TPF 23: Cinco de Mayhem; Lemoore, CA, United States	May 7, 2015	
Njokuani vacated the title when he signed with Bellator.

=== Lightweight Championship ===
146 to 155 lbs (66 to 70 kg)

No.	Name	Event	Date	Defenses
1	(United States) Gabe Ruediger def. Lenny Lovato	TPF 5: Stars and Strikes; Lemoore, CA, United States	July 9, 2010	
Reudiger vacated the title when he retired from MMA competition on May 31, 2013.
2	(United States) Poppies Martinez def. Christos Giagos	TPF 16: The Return; Lemoore, CA, United States	August 22, 2013	
Martinez was stripped of the title in April 2014 when he left TPF for Bellator MMA.
3	(United States) Christos Giagos def. Sevak Magakian	TPF 19: Throwback Thursday; Lemoore, CA, United States	June 19, 2014	
Giagos vacated the title in September of 2014 when he left TPF for the UFC.
4	(United States) Tony Llamas def. Dominic Clark	TPF 25: Fall Brawl; Lemoore, CA, United States	November 19, 2015	
Llamas vacated the title due to an injury.
5	(United States) Danny Navarro def. Brian Cobb	TPF 28: Hot; Lemoore, CA, United States	August 4, 2016	

=== Featherweight Championship ===
136 to 145 lbs (61 to 66 kg)

No.	Name	Event	Date	Defenses
1	(United States) Isaac DeJesus def. Nam Phan	TPF 3: Champions Collide; Lemoore, CA, United States	February 4, 2010	
De Jesus was stripped of his title when he failed to make weight for his TPF 9 title defense.
2	(United States) Eddie Yagin def. Joe Soto	TPF 10: Redemption; Lemoore, CA, United States	August 5, 2011	
Yagin vacated the title when he left TPF for the UFC.
3	(Armenia) Georgi Karakhanyan def. Isaac DeJesus	TPF 11: Redemption; Lemoore, CA, United States	December 2, 2011	1. def. Micah Miller at TPF 14: Validation on Sep 7, 2012
Karakhanyan vacated the title when he left TPF for the World Series of Fighting.
4	(United States) Art Arciniega def. Marcello Cassero	TPF 16; The Return; Lemoore, CA, United States	August 22, 2013	
Arciniega was stripped of the title and is considered retired.
5	(United States) Poppies Martinez def. Chris Culley	TPF 18; Martinez vs. Culley; Lemoore, CA, United States	February 6, 2014	
Martinez was stripped of the title in April 2014 when he left TPF for Bellator MMA.
8	(United States) Adrian Diaz def. Andres Quintana	TPF 27; Mayhem; Lemoore, CA, United States	May 19, 2016	1. def. Cody Gibson (bantamweight (c)) at TPF 31: Diaz vs. Gibson on May 18, 2017

=== Bantamweight Championship ===
126 to 135 lbs (57 to 61 kg)

No.	Name	Event	Date	Defenses
1	(United States) Cole Escovedo def. Jeff Bedard	TPF 3: Champions Collide; Lemoore, CA, United States	February 4, 2010	
2	(United States) Michael McDonald	TPF 5: Stars and Strikes; Lemoore, CA, United States	July 9, 2010	
McDonald vacated the title in September 2010 when he left TPF for the WEC.
3	(United States) Ulysses Gomez def. Cody Gibson	TPF 11: Redemption; Lemoore, CA, United States	December 2, 2011	
Gomez vacated the title in July 2012 when he left TPF for the UFC.
4	(United States) Ian Loveland def. Alexander Crispim	TPF 13: Unfinished Business; Lemoore, CA, United States	May 10, 2012	1. def. Casey Olson at TPF 14: Validation on Sep 7, 2012
-	(United States) Russell Doane def. Jared Papazian for Interim title	TPF 17: Fall Brawl; Lemoore, CA, United States	November 14, 2013	
Loveland & Doane were both stripped of their titles, when Loveland was unable to defend his title due to injury and Doane signed with the UFC.
5	(United States) Joe Soto def. Jeremiah Labiano	TPF 18: Martinez vs. Culley; Lemoore, CA, United States	Feb. 6, 2014	1. def. Terrion Ware at TPF 20: Night of Champions on Jun 19, 2014
Soto vacated the title in August 2014 when he left TPF for the UFC.
6	(United States) Rolando Velasco def. Josh San Diego	TPF 24: Summer Brawl; Lemoore, CA, United States	Aug. 6, 2015	1. def. Joe Neal at TPF 26: Brawl in the Hall on Feb 18, 2016
7	(United States) Cody Gibson def. Rolando Velasco	TPF 27: Mayhem; Lemoore, CA, United States	May 19, 2016	1. def. Kyle Reyes at TPF 29: Fall Brawl on Nov 3, 2016

=== Flyweight Championship ===
116 to 125 lbs (53 to 57 kg)

No.	Name	Event	Date	Defenses
1	(United States) Ulysses Gomez def. Luis Gonzalez	TPF 4: Cinco de Mayhem; Lemoore, CA, United States	May 5, 2010	
2	(United States) Darrell Montague def. Ulysses Gomez	TPF 8: All or Nothing; Lemoore, CA, United States	February 18, 2011	
3	(United States) Ian McCall def. Darrell Montague	TPF 10: Redemption; Lemoore, CA, United States	August 5, 2011	
McCall vacated the title in December 2011 when he left TPF for the UFC.
4	(Mexico) Hector Sandoval def. Ryan Hollis	TPF 20; Night of Champions; Lemoore, CA, United States	August 7, 2014	
5	(United States) Willie Gates def. Hector Sandoval	TPF 21; All or Nothing; Lemoore, CA, United States	November 6, 2014	
Gates vacated the title in December 2014 when he left TPF for the UFC.
6	(United States) Alex Perez def. Martin Sandoval	TPF 22; Champions Collide 2 Lemoore, CA, United States	February 5, 2015	
7	(United States) Adam Antolin def. Alex Perez	TPF 25; Fall Brawl; Lemoore, CA, United States	November 19, 2015	
Antolin vacated the title in August 2016 when he left TPF for the UFC to compete in the TUF: Tournament of Champions.
8	(United States) Casey Kenney def. Alvin Cacdac	TPF 30; Navarro vs. Carrizosa II; Lemoore, CA, United States	February 2, 2017	

== See also ==
- Palace Fighting Championship
