= UFC 187 =

UFC mixed martial arts event in 2015

UFC 187: Johnson vs. Cormier
- The poster for UFC 187: Johnson vs. Cormier
- Promotion: Ultimate Fighting Championship
- Date: May 23, 2015
- Venue: MGM Grand Garden Arena
- City: Las Vegas, Nevada
- Attendance: 12,615
- Total gate: $5,189,623
- Buyrate: 375,000

Event chronology
| UFC Fight Night: Edgar vs. Faber | UFC 187: Johnson vs. Cormier | UFC Fight Night: Condit vs. Alves |

UFC 187: Johnson vs. Cormier was a mixed martial arts event held on May 23, 2015, at the MGM Grand Garden Arena in Las Vegas, Nevada.

== Background ==
The event was expected to be headlined by a UFC Light Heavyweight Championship bout between then champion Jon Jones and top contender Anthony Johnson. However, on April 28, following Jones' hit-and-run incident (see section below), the UFC decided to strip him of the title and suspend him indefinitely. He was replaced by the previous title challenger Daniel Cormier, who was scheduled to face Ryan Bader in the main event of UFC Fight Night 68.

The co-main event featured a UFC Middleweight Championship bout between current champion Chris Weidman and former UFC Light Heavyweight champion and UFC 12 Heavyweight Tournament winner Vitor Belfort. The much delayed pairing had been rescheduled for several events. The first of which was UFC 173, where Belfort withdrew from the bout following the Nevada State Athletic Commission's ban on testosterone replacement therapy. The other events were UFC 181 and UFC 184, where Weidman withdrew from both bouts because of a broken hand and injured ribs, respectively.

The event was also expected to feature a UFC Lightweight Championship title eliminator bout between top contenders Khabib Nurmagomedov and Donald Cerrone. However, Nurmagomedov pulled out of the bout on April 30 because of a knee injury. He was replaced by John Makdessi.

Sean Spencer was expected to face Mike Pyle at the event. However, Spencer pulled out of the bout on April 23 because of an injury. He was replaced by Colby Covington.

Nina Ansaroff missed weight on her first attempt at the weigh-ins, coming in 4 lb overweight at 120 lb. After having made no attempts to cut further, she was fined 20 percent of her fight purse, which went to Rose Namajunas. However, on the day of the event, Ansaroff pulled out of the bout after contracting a case of the flu. As a result, the fight was pulled from the event entirely.

During the Fox Sports 1 preliminary card broadcast, the UFC announced that B.J. Penn, Bas Rutten and the late Jeff Blatnick would be inducted to the UFC's revamped Hall of Fame at the "International Fight Week" in July, surrounding UFC 189.

=== Jones' hit-and-run incident ===
On April 26, it was rumored that Jones was forced out of the event. After several rumors regarding the cause of Jones' possible removal, it was later reported by MMAFighting that Jones was being sought for questioning in a hit-and-run car accident in Albuquerque, New Mexico, where he lives. At the time, the case was under investigation and the Albuquerque Police Department wanted to speak with Jones regarding the matter. According to Albuquerque PD spokesman Simon Drobik, Jones was named as a suspect, but he had yet to be reached by anyone. The UFC stated that they were aware of APD's interest in speaking to Jones and they were "in the process of gathering facts and will reserve further comment until more information was available."

On the following day, new information came out that Jones allegedly fled the scene of the accident before turning back to grab "a large handful of cash," according to a police report. An officer on the scene searched the car that allegedly ran a red light and caused the accident early Sunday morning, and stated he found documents identifying Jones. The officer also found a marijuana pipe and marijuana inside the rented vehicle. Jones' case was being investigated as a misdemeanor, which carries a maximum penalty of one year in jail and fines. However the victim, a pregnant woman, suffered a broken bone and now Jones faces a felony charge, which carries jail time of up to three years, as well as fines. An arrest warrant for the fighter was issued and Jones eventually turned himself in, after his lawyer arranged the plans for his surrender. Just hours later, Jones posted the $2,500 bail and left the Bernalillo County Metro Detention Center on Monday night. On April 28, the UFC announced that Jones was stripped of his belt and suspended indefinitely due to his alleged involvement.

== Results ==
Main Card
| Weight class | | | | Method | Round | Time | Notes |
|---|---|---|---|---|---|---|---|
| Light Heavyweight | Daniel Cormier | def. | Anthony Johnson | Submission (rear-naked choke) | 3 | 2:39 | (Note: For the vacant UFC Light Heavyweight Championship.) |
| Middleweight | Chris Weidman (c) | def. | Vitor Belfort | TKO (punches) | 1 | 2:53 | (Note: For the UFC Middleweight Championship.) |
| Lightweight | Donald Cerrone | def. | John Makdessi | TKO (head kick) | 2 | 4:44 |
| Heavyweight | Andrei Arlovski | def. | Travis Browne | TKO (punches) | 1 | 4:41 |
| Flyweight | Joseph Benavidez | def. | John Moraga | Decision (unanimous) (30–27, 30–27, 30–27) | 3 | 5:00 |
Preliminary Card (Fox Sports 1)
| Flyweight | John Dodson | def. | Zach Makovsky | Decision (unanimous) (29–28, 29–28, 29–28) | 3 | 5:00 |
| Welterweight | Dong Hyun Kim | def. | Josh Burkman | Submission (arm-triangle choke) | 3 | 2:13 |
| Middleweight | Rafael Natal | def. | Uriah Hall | Decision (split) (29–28, 28–29, 29–28) | 3 | 5:00 |
| Welterweight | Colby Covington | def. | Mike Pyle | Decision (unanimous) (30–27, 29–28, 30–27) | 3 | 5:00 |
Preliminary Card (UFC Fight Pass)
| Lightweight | Islam Makhachev | def. | Leo Kuntz | Submission (rear-naked choke) | 2 | 2:38 |
| Flyweight | Justin Scoggins | def. | Josh Sampo | Decision (unanimous) (30–27, 30–27, 30–27) | 3 | 5:00 |

== Bonus awards ==
The following fighters were awarded $50,000 bonuses:

- Fight of the Night: Andrei Arlovski vs. Travis Browne
- Performance of the Night: Daniel Cormier and Chris Weidman

== Reported payout ==
The following is the reported payout to the fighters as reported to the Nevada State Athletic Commission. It does not include sponsor money and also does not include the UFC's traditional "fight night" bonuses.

- Daniel Cormier: $180,000 (includes $90,000 win bonus) def. Anthony Johnson: $500,000
- Chris Weidman: $500,000 (includes $250,000 win bonus) def. Vitor Belfort: $300,000
- Donald Cerrone: $152,000 (includes $76,000 win bonus) def. John Makdessi: $30,000
- Andrei Arlovski: $84,000 (includes $42,000 win bonus) def. Travis Browne: $60,000
- Joseph Benavidez: $106,000 (includes $53,000 win bonus) def. John Moraga: $28,000
- John Dodson: $40,000 (includes $20,000 win bonus) def. Zach Makovsky: $19,000
- Dong Hyun Kim: $116,000 (includes $58,000 win bonus) def. Josh Burkman: $45,000
- Rafael Natal: $70,000 (includes $35,000 win bonus) def. Uriah Hall: $14,000
- Colby Covington: $24,000 (includes $12,000 win bonus) def. Mike Pyle: $51,000
- Islam Makhachev: $20,000 (includes $10,000 win bonus) def. Leo Kuntz: $10,000
- Justin Scoggins: $30,000 (includes $15,000 win bonus) def. Josh Sampo: $13,000

== See also ==
- List of UFC events
- 2015 in UFC
