= John Dodson (fighter) =

American mixed martial artist

- Born: September 26, 1984 (age 42); Albuquerque, New Mexico, United States
- Other names: The Magician
- Height: 5 ft 3 in (1.60 m)
- Weight: 125 lb (57 kg; 8.9 st)
- Division: Flyweight; Bantamweight
- Reach: 66 in (168 cm)
- Style: Gaidojutsu, Boxing
- Stance: Southpaw
- Fighting out of: Albuquerque, New Mexico, United States
- Team: Jackson's MMA
- Rank: Black belt in Gaidojutsu
- Years active: 2004–present

Mixed martial arts record
- Total: 39
- Wins: 24
- By knockout: 11
- By submission: 2
- By decision: 11
- Losses: 15
- By decision: 15

Other information
- Mixed martial arts record from Sherdog

John Dodson (born September 26, 1984) is an American mixed martial artist and bare-knuckle boxer who competes in the flyweight divisions of Rizin Fighting Federation and Bare Knuckle Fighting Championship, where in the latter promotion, he was inaugural BKFC Flyweight Champion. A professional mixed martial arts competitor since 2004, Dodson has made a name for himself fighting mainly in the Southwest region. He was the winner of the Spike TV's The Ultimate Fighter: Team Bisping vs. Team Miller and competed in Ultimate Fighting Championship where he was a two-time title challenger, competing most recently in the bantamweight division, and is a veteran of the promotion with nine years of competition.

== Early and personal life ==
Dodson was born in Albuquerque, New Mexico. He grew up in Albuquerque and later moved to Edgewood, New Mexico with his family. Dodson is of African American and Filipino descent. He attended Moriarty High School in Moriarty, New Mexico. While attending Moriarty High School, Dodson competed in track and field, football and amateur wrestling. In wrestling, Dodson was a two-time state champion, one time state runner-up and four time district champion. Dodson graduated from high school in 2003, and then enrolled at the University of New Mexico while working at a local Chuck E. Cheese's restaurant. However, he did not earn a degree.

Dodson was raised by a single mother who hails from the Philippines, along with his brother, Eric. His favorite Filipino food is Pancit. Dodson has daughters named Delilah Skye and Aurora Rose with his wife Chelsea.

== Mixed martial arts career ==
Dodson began training MMA in 2002 after Chris Luttrell and Greg Jackson recruited him for his extensive wrestling background. After the first day of training, he "fell in love with the sport" and continued to train daily with Jackson.

Dodson competed in a Grappler's Quest and won in the beginner level. Four months later, he competed in another submission tournament, winning at the intermediate level. Six months later, Dodson competed in his first amateur fight. He competed in one other amateur bout before turning pro. Dodson was offered to make his debut in Japan against the number one ranked flyweight in the world, Yasuhiro Urushitani. Dodson lost the fight via decision.

With the lack of fights materializing at flyweight, Dodson began taking fights at featherweight and bantamweight as well. He obtained a 3–2 record before taking a fight against future WEC fighter, Clint Godfrey, winning the fight via decision. With the win over Godfrey, Dodson was selected to be a part of the second season of the Tapout Reality show.

Despite having a 1–1 record under the Ultimate Warrior Challenge promotion, he was awarded shot at the vacant UWC flyweight title at UWC 7. Dodson was defeated by Pat Runez in a highly controversial five-round decision. At UWC 8, Dodson defeated previously unbeaten Jesse Riggleman via unanimous decision.

Dodson was expected to fight at Tachi Palace Fights 9 against Alexis Vila. However, Vila suffered an injury and was forced to pull out of the bout. Vila was replaced by former Shooto champion Mamoru Yamaguchi. Dodson then pulled out of the fight for unknown reasons, and was replaced by Kevin Dunsmoor.

=== The Ultimate Fighter ===
In 2011, Dodson had signed with the UFC to compete on The Ultimate Fighter: Team Bisping vs. Team Miller. In the first episode, Dodson fought Brandon Merkt to gain entry into the Ultimate Fighter house. Dodson defeated Merkt in the first round via TKO.

Dodson was selected as a part of Team Mayhem, he was the first bantamweight chosen for the team (fourth overall). Dodson defeated John Albert via unanimous decision in the preliminary round and moved onto the semi-finals.

In the semi-finals Dodson was selected to fight Team Mayhem teammate, Johnny Bedford. After a close first round, Dodson won the fight via KO in the first minute of the second round. The win moved Dodson into the finals. The impressive finish also won Dodson an additional $25,000 for the fan voted "Knockout of the Season".

=== Ultimate Fighting Championship ===
Dodson made his UFC debut on December 3, 2011, at The Ultimate Fighter 14 Finale against T.J. Dillashaw to determine the bantamweight winner of The Ultimate Fighter 14. Dodson won the fight via TKO in the first round to become the first Bantamweight winner of The Ultimate Fighter competition. He received an additional $40,000 for winning Knockout of the Night honors.

For his next fight, Dodson moved back down to the flyweight division and was expected to face Darren Uyenoyama on May 5, 2012, at UFC on Fox 3. However, Uyenoyama was forced out of the bout, and was replaced by promotional newcomer Tim Elliott. Dodson defeated Elliott by unanimous decision, generating crowd booing.

Dodson faced promotional newcomer Jussier Formiga on October 5, 2012, at UFC on FX 5. He won the fight via TKO in the second round.

==== First title shot ====
Dodson faced UFC Flyweight champion Demetrious Johnson on January 26, 2013, at UFC on Fox 6, becoming the first Ultimate Fighter alumnus to fight for a title post-season 5. Despite knocking Johnson down twice in the second round, Dodson lost the fight via unanimous decision in a bout that earned both participants Fight of the Night honors.

Dodson faced promotional newcomer Darrell Montague on October 19, 2013, at UFC 166. He won via knockout at 4:13 of the first round. The win also earned him his second Knockout of the Night award.

Dodson was expected to face Scott Jorgensen on December 14, 2013, at UFC on Fox 9, replacing Ian McCall. However, Dodson himself was forced from the bout after sustaining a knee injury. Jorgensen instead faced promotional newcomer Zach Makovsky.

A rematch with John Moraga took place on June 7, 2014, at UFC Fight Night 42. Dodson won the fight via TKO due to a doctor stoppage between rounds two and three after a knee he threw late in the second round.

Dodson faced Zach Makovsky on May 23, 2015, at UFC 187. Dodson won the fight via unanimous decision.

==== Second title shot ====
A rematch with the Flyweight champion Demetrious Johnson took place on September 5, 2015, at UFC 191. In a completely one-sided affair, Dodson lost the fight via unanimous decision.

==== Return to Bantamweight ====
Dodson faced Manvel Gamburyan in a bantamweight bout on April 16, 2016, at UFC on Fox 19, He won the fight via TKO in the first round.

Dodson faced John Lineker on October 1, 2016, at UFC Fight Night 96. The bout took place at a catchweight of 136.5 lbs as Lineker missed weight. He lost the back and forth fight via split decision.

Dodson faced Eddie Wineland on April 22, 2017, at UFC Fight Night 108. He won the fight via unanimous decision.

Dodson faced Marlon Moraes on November 11, 2017, at UFC Fight Night 120. He lost the fight via split decision.

Dodson was expected to face Pedro Munhoz at UFC Fight Night 125 on February 3, 2018. However, Munhoz missed weight by four pounds over the bantamweight non-title fight upper limit of 136 pounds, negotiations fell through, and the fight was cancelled. The fight was rescheduled to UFC 222 on March 3, 2018. Dodson won the bout via split decision.

Dodson's contract with UFC expired after the fight with Munhoz and after listening to offers from various companies, he re-signed a new four-fight with UFC.

Dodson faced Jimmie Rivera on September 8, 2018, at UFC 228. He lost the fight via unanimous decision.

Dodson faced Petr Yan on February 23, 2019, at UFC Fight Night 145. He lost the fight by unanimous decision.

Dodson faced Nathaniel Wood on February 15, 2020, at UFC Fight Night 167. He won the fight via TKO in the third round.

On June 16, 2020, news surfaced that with one fight left on his prevailing contract, Dodson re-signed a five-fight deal with the UFC.

Dodson faced Merab Dvalishvili on August 15, 2020, at UFC 252. He lost the fight via unanimous decision.

On September 18, 2020, it was announced that Dodson was released by UFC.

=== Post UFC ===
Dodson was scheduled to fight his first bout after release on July 30, 2021, at XMMA 2 against Cody Gibson. However, Dodson got into a potentially life-threatening car accident with his family and withdrew from the bout. Gibson knocked out replacement Louis Sanoudakis in 44 seconds. Dodson's bout with Gibson was rescheduled for XMMA 3 on October 23. Dodson lost the fight by unanimous decision.

Dodson faced Francisco Rivera on April 2, 2022, at XMMA 4. He won the bout via unanimous decision.

Dodson signed a multi-fight contract with Rizin Fighting Federation and debuted against Hideo Tokoro in a return to flyweight on December 31, 2022, at Rizin 40. He won the bout by knockout in the first round via punches.

Dodson faced Tatsuki Saomoto at Rizin 42 on May 6, 2023. He won the fight by unanimous decision.

Dodson faced Hiromasa Ougikubo on December 31, 2023, at Rizin 45. and lost the bout via unanimous decision.

== Bare-knuckle boxing career ==
=== Bare Knuckle Fighting Championship ===
In June 2022, it was announced that Dodson signed with Bare Knuckle Fighting Championship.

Dodson faced Ryan Benoit on August 27, 2022, at BKFC 28. Dodson won the fight via knockout in the first round. This fight earned him the Performance of the Night award.

Dodson fought Jarod Grant on February 17, 2023, at BKFC KnuckleMania 3. He won the bout by first round knockout.

Dodson fought for the inaugural BKFC Flyweight championship on August 11, 2023, at BKFC 48 and won by first round technical knockout.

On March 29, 2024 in Albuquerque, New Mexico, Dodson put his BKFC Flyweight Championship on the line against Dagoberto Aguero in the main event of BKFC 59. The fight was ruled a unanimous draw. This fight earned him the Fight of the Night award.

Dodson competed for the BKFC Bantamweight Championship against Jamel Herring on October 17, 2026 at BKFC 95. He lost the fight by unanimous decision.

== Championships and accomplishments ==
=== Mixed martial arts ===
- Ultimate Fighting Championship
  - The Ultimate Fighter 14 Bantamweight Tournament Winner
  - The Ultimate Fighter 14 Knockout of the Season
  - Fight of the Night (One time) vs. Demetrious Johnson
  - Knockout of the Night (Two times) vs. T.J. Dillashaw and Darrell Montague
  - UFC.com Awards
    - 2011: Ranked #5 Newcomer of the Year (Tied with Diego Brandão)
    - 2013: Ranked #7 Fight of the Year vs. Demetrious Johnson

=== Bare-knuckle boxing ===
- Bare Knuckle Fighting Championship
  - BKFC Flyweight Championship (One time; current; inaugural)
  - Fight of the Night (One time) vs. Dagoberto Aguero
  - Performance of the Night (One time) vs. Ryan Benoit

== Mixed martial arts record ==
Professional record breakdown
39 matches	24 wins	15 losses
By knockout	11	0
By submission	2	0
By decision	11	15

Res.	Record	Opponent	Method	Event	Date	Round	Time	Location	Notes
Loss	24–15	Takaki Soya	Decision (unanimous)	Rizin: Otoko Matsuri	May 4, 2025	3	5:00	Tokyo, Japan	
Loss	24–14	Hiromasa Ougikubo	Decision (unanimous)	Rizin 45	December 31, 2023	3	5:00	Saitama, Japan	
Win	24–13	Tatsuki Saomoto	Decision (unanimous)	Rizin 42	May 6, 2023	3	5:00	Tokyo, Japan	
Win	23–13	Hideo Tokoro	KO (punches)	Rizin 40	December 31, 2022	1	1:43	Saitama, Japan	Return to Flyweight.
Win	22–13	Francisco Rivera	Decision (unanimous)	XMMA 4	April 2, 2022	3	5:00	New Orleans, Louisiana, United States	
Loss	21–13	Cody Gibson	Decision (unanimous)	XMMA 3	October 23, 2021	3	5:00	Miami, Florida, United States	
Loss	21–12	Merab Dvalishvili	Decision (unanimous)	UFC 252	August 15, 2020	3	5:00	Las Vegas, Nevada, United States	
Win	21–11	Nathaniel Wood	TKO (punches)	UFC Fight Night: Anderson vs. Błachowicz 2	February 15, 2020	3	0:16	Rio Rancho, New Mexico, United States	
Loss	20–11	Petr Yan	Decision (unanimous)	UFC Fight Night: Błachowicz vs. Santos	February 23, 2019	3	5:00	Prague, Czech Republic	
Loss	20–10	Jimmie Rivera	Decision (unanimous)	UFC 228	September 8, 2018	3	5:00	Dallas, Texas, United States	
Win	20–9	Pedro Munhoz	Decision (split)	UFC 222	March 3, 2018	3	5:00	Las Vegas, Nevada, United States	
Loss	19–9	Marlon Moraes	Decision (split)	UFC Fight Night: Poirier vs. Pettis	November 11, 2017	3	5:00	Norfolk, Virginia, United States	
Win	19–8	Eddie Wineland	Decision (unanimous)	UFC Fight Night: Swanson vs. Lobov	April 22, 2017	3	5:00	Nashville, Tennessee, United States	
Loss	18–8	John Lineker	Decision (split)	UFC Fight Night: Lineker vs. Dodson	October 1, 2016	5	5:00	Portland, Oregon, United States	Catchweight (136.5 lb) bout; Lineker missed weight.
Win	18–7	Manvel Gamburyan	TKO (punches)	UFC on Fox: Teixeira vs. Evans	April 16, 2016	1	0:37	Tampa, Florida, United States	Return to Bantamweight.
Loss	17–7	Demetrious Johnson	Decision (unanimous)	UFC 191	September 5, 2015	5	5:00	Las Vegas, Nevada, United States	For the UFC Flyweight Championship.
Win	17–6	Zach Makovsky	Decision (unanimous)	UFC 187	May 23, 2015	3	5:00	Las Vegas, Nevada, United States	
Win	16–6	John Moraga	TKO (doctor stoppage)	UFC Fight Night: Henderson vs. Khabilov	June 7, 2014	2	5:00	Albuquerque, New Mexico, United States	
Win	15–6	Darrell Montague	KO (punch)	UFC 166	October 19, 2013	1	4:13	Houston, Texas, United States	Knockout of the Night.
Loss	14–6	Demetrious Johnson	Decision (unanimous)	UFC on Fox: Johnson vs. Dodson	January 26, 2013	5	5:00	Chicago, Illinois, United States	For the UFC Flyweight Championship. Fight of the Night.
Win	14–5	Jussier Formiga	TKO (punches)	UFC on FX: Browne vs. Bigfoot	October 5, 2012	2	4:35	Minneapolis, Minnesota, United States	UFC Flyweight title eliminator.
Win	13–5	Tim Elliott	Decision (unanimous)	UFC on Fox: Diaz vs. Miller	May 5, 2012	3	5:00	East Rutherford, New Jersey, United States	Return to Flyweight.
Win	12–5	T.J. Dillashaw	TKO (punches)	The Ultimate Fighter: Team Bisping vs. Team Miller Finale	December 3, 2011	1	1:54	Las Vegas, Nevada, United States	Won The Ultimate Fighter 14 Bantamweight tournament. Knockout of the Night.
Win	11–5	John Moraga	Decision (unanimous)	Nemesis Fighting: MMA Global Invasion	December 11, 2010	3	5:00	Punta Cana, Dominican Republic	
Win	10–5	Jessie Riggleman	Decision (unanimous)	Ultimate Warrior Challenge 8	May 22, 2010	3	5:00	Fairfax, Virginia, United States	
Loss	9–5	Pat Runez	Decision (split)	Ultimate Warrior Challenge 7	October 3, 2009	5	5:00	Fairfax, Virginia, United States	For the UWC Flyweight Championship.
Win	9–4	Jose Lujan	TKO (punches)	Duke City MMA Series 2	July 25, 2009	1	0:52	Albuquerque, New Mexico, United States	
Win	8–4	Jose Villarisco	Decision (unanimous)	Ultimate Warrior Challenge 5	February 21, 2009	3	5:00	Fairfax, Virginia, United States	Flyweight bout.
Loss	7–4	Mike Easton	Decision (split)	Ultimate Warrior Challenge 4	October 11, 2008	3	5:00	Fairfax, Virginia, United States	
Win	7–3	Vern Baca	TKO (punches)	Battlequest 8	April 11, 2008	1	3:42	Denver, Colorado, United States	
Win	6–3	Zac White	Submission (rear-naked choke)	Last Man Standing 2	December 15, 2007	1	3:42	Roswell, New Mexico, United States	
Loss	5–3	Bill Boland	Decision (unanimous)	Ultimate Cage Wars 7	April 7, 2007	3	5:00	Winnipeg, Manitoba, Canada	
Win	5–2	Jake Long	TKO (slam and punches)	Last Man Standing 1	March 17, 2007	1	N/A	Roswell, New Mexico, United States	
Win	4–2	Clint Godfrey	Decision (unanimous)	Ring of Fire 27	December 9, 2006	3	5:00	Castle Rock, Colorado, United States	
Loss	3–2	Joe Doherty	Decision (unanimous)	Ring of Fire 25	July 29, 2006	3	5:00	Vail, Colorado, United States	Won the Ring of Fire Bantamweight Championship.
Win	3–1	Jared Moreland	TKO (punches)	Rumble in the Rockies 2	February 18, 2006	1	2:55	Loveland, Colorado, United States	
Win	2–1	Johnny Velasquez	Decision (split)	KOTC: Socorro	July 23, 2005	2	5:00	Socorro, New Mexico, United States	
Loss	1–1	Yasuhiro Urushitani	Decision (unanimous)	Demolition 041114	November 14, 2004	2	5:00	Tokyo, Japan	Flyweight bout.
Win	1–0	Zac White	Submission (rear-naked choke)	Desert Extreme	September 3, 2004	1	3:23	Socorro, New Mexico, United States	

=== Mixed martial arts exhibition record ===
Exhibition record breakdown		
3 matches	3 wins	0 losses
By knockout	2	0
By decision	1	0

Res.	Record	Opponent	Method	Event	Date	Round	Time	Location	Notes
Win	3–0	Johnny Bedford	KO (punches)	The Ultimate Fighter: Team Bisping vs. Team Miller	November 30, 2011 (airdate)	2	1:00	Las Vegas, Nevada, United States	The Ultimate Fighter 14 Semi-finals.
Win	2–0	John Albert	Decision (unanimous)	The Ultimate Fighter: Team Bisping vs. Team Miller	October 26, 2011 (airdate)	2	5:00	Las Vegas, Nevada, United States	The Ultimate Fighter 14 Quarter-finals.
Win	1–0	Brandon Merkt	TKO (punches)	The Ultimate Fighter: Team Bisping vs. Team Miller	September 21, 2011 (airdate)	1	1:37	Las Vegas, Nevada, United States	The Ultimate Fighter 14 Preliminary bout.

== Bare knuckle boxing record ==
Professional record breakdown
6 matches	4 wins	1 loss
By knockout	3	0
By decision	1	1
Draws	1	

Res.	Record	Opponent	Method	Event	Date	Round	Time	Location	Notes
Loss	4–1–1	Jamel Herring	Decision (split)	BKFC 95	October 17, 2026	5	2:00	Newark, New Jersey, United States	For the BKFC Bantamweight Championship.
Win	4–0–1	Takaki Soya	Decision (unanimous)	Super Rizin 3	July 28, 2024	5	2:00	Saitama, Japan	
Draw	3–0–1	Dagoberto Aguero	Draw (unanimous)	BKFC 59	March 29, 2024	5	2:00	Albuquerque, New Mexico, United States	Retained the BKFC Flyweight Championship. Fight of the Night. The BKFC Flyweight division was discontinued on October 16, 2026.
Win	3–0	JR Ridge	TKO (punches)	BKFC 48	August 11, 2023	1	1:49	Albuquerque, New Mexico, United States	Won the inaugural BKFC Flyweight Championship.
Win	2–0	Jarod Grant	KO (punches)	BKFC KnuckleMania 3	February 17, 2023	1	1:41	Albuquerque, New Mexico, United States	
Win	1–0	Ryan Benoit	KO (punch)	BKFC 28	August 27, 2022	1	0:40	Albuquerque, New Mexico, United States	Performance of the Night.

== See also ==
- List of current Rizin FF fighters
- List of male mixed martial artists
