= UFC on ESPN: Hall vs. Strickland =

2021 MMA event

- The poster for UFC on ESPN: Hall vs. Strickland
- Promotion: Ultimate Fighting Championship
- Date: July 31, 2021
- Venue: UFC Apex
- City: Enterprise, Nevada
- Attendance: Not announced

Event chronology
| UFC on ESPN: Sandhagen vs. Dillashaw | UFC on ESPN: Hall vs. Strickland | UFC 265: Lewis vs. Gane |

UFC on ESPN: Hall vs. Strickland (also known as UFC on ESPN 28 and UFC Vegas 33) was a mixed martial arts event produced by the Ultimate Fighting Championship that took place on July 31, 2021 at the UFC Apex facility in Enterprise, Nevada, part of the Las Vegas Metropolitan Area, United States.

== Background ==
A middleweight bout between Uriah Hall and Sean Strickland was originally expected to take place a week later at UFC 265. In turn, the pairing was moved in order to headline this event.

Former Invicta FC Atomweight Champion Jinh Yu Frey was briefly expected to face promotional newcomer Istela Nunes, but the latter was forced to withdraw from the women's strawweight bout due to visa issues and was replaced by Ashley Yoder.

A flyweight bout between Zarrukh Adashev and Juancamilo Ronderos was originally linked to this event. However, Ronderos was removed from the bout in early July and was replaced by Ryan Benoit. They were originally expected to meet two months earlier at UFC on ESPN: Rodriguez vs. Waterson, but Benoit missed weight and the contest was canceled due to health concerns.

A flyweight bout between former UFC Flyweight Championship challenger Alex Perez and Askar Askarov was scheduled for the event. However, Askarov pulled out of the fight in early July due to a broken hand. Perez is now expected to face Matt Schnell four weeks later at UFC Fight Night 191. They were originally expected to meet at UFC 262, before Perez was forced to pull out due to undisclosed reasons.

A bantamweight bout between Ronnie Lawrence and John Castañeda was scheduled for this event. However on July 18, Castaneda pulled out of the bout and was replaced by Trevin Jones. In turn, the bout was canceled when Lawrence failed to show up for the weigh-ins due to health concerns.

Featherweights Choi Doo-ho and Danny Chavez were expected to meet at the event. However, Choi was forced to pull out of the bout due to an injury and was replaced by Kai Kamaka III.

A heavyweight bout between Shamil Abdurakhimov and Chris Daukaus was expected to take place at the event. The pairing was initially scheduled to meet one week prior at UFC on ESPN: Sandhagen vs. Dillashaw, but the matchup was removed from that card on July 19 due to COVID-19 protocols within Abdurakhimov's camp. Subsequently, on July 26 the bout was yet again postponed to a future event for unknown reasons.

Roman Kopylov was scheduled to meet Sam Alvey in a middleweight bout at this event. However, he wasn't able to obtain a visa in time and the bout was scrapped.

A welterweight contest featuring Mounir Lazzez and Niklas Stolze was also booked for this card. In turn, Lazzez pulled out just a few days before the event due to visa issues and was replaced by Jared Gooden. The new pairing was initially reported as canceled just hours before the event due to COVID-19 protocols, but it was later confirmed that both fighters were cleared to compete.

At the weigh-ins, former UFC Women's Flyweight Champion Nicco Montaño (also The Ultimate Fighter: A New World Champion flyweight winner) and Philip Rowe missed weight for their respective bouts. Montaño weighed in at 143 pounds, seven pounds over the women's bantamweight non-title fight limit. Her bout against Wu Yanan was canceled due to the weight discrepancy. Rowe weighed in at 173.5 pounds, two and half pounds over the welterweight non-title fight limit. His bout proceeded at a catchweight and he was fined 20% of his individual purse, which went to his opponent Orion Cosce.

A bantamweight bout between Kang Kyung-ho and Rani Yahya was expected to serve as the co-main event. However, the bout was canceled a few hours before the event due to Yahya testing positive for COVID-19.

== Results ==
Main card (ESPN / ESPN+)
| Weight class | | | | Method | Round | Time | Notes |
|---|---|---|---|---|---|---|---|
| Middleweight | Sean Strickland | def. | Uriah Hall | Decision (unanimous) (50–44, 50–45, 49–46) | 5 | 5:00 |
| Women’s Strawweight | Cheyanne Buys | def. | Gloria de Paula | TKO (head kick and punches) | 1 | 1:00 |
| Welterweight | Jared Gooden | def. | Niklas Stolze | KO (punch) | 1 | 1:08 |
| Featherweight | Melsik Baghdasaryan | def. | Collin Anglin | TKO (head kick and punches) | 2 | 1:50 |
| Welterweight | Jason Witt | def. | Bryan Barberena | Decision (majority) (28–28, 29–27, 29–28) | 3 | 5:00 |
Preliminary card (ESPN / ESPN+)
| Lightweight | Chris Gruetzemacher | def. | Rafa García | Decision (unanimous) (29–28, 29–28, 29–28) | 3 | 5:00 |
| Featherweight | Kai Kamaka III | vs. | Danny Chavez | Draw (majority) (29–27, 28–28, 28–28) | 3 | 5:00 | (Note: Kamaka was deducted one point in round 2 for an eye poke and a groin strike.) |
| Women’s Strawweight | Jinh Yu Frey | def. | Ashley Yoder | Decision (unanimous) (30–27, 30–27, 30–27) | 3 | 5:00 |
| Flyweight | Zarrukh Adashev | def. | Ryan Benoit | Decision (unanimous) (30–27, 30–27, 29–28) | 3 | 5:00 |
| Catchweight (173.5 lb) | Philip Rowe | def. | Orion Cosce | TKO (punches) | 2 | 4:21 |

== Bonus awards ==
The following fighters received $50,000 bonuses.

- Fight of the Night: Jason Witt vs. Bryan Barberena
- Performance of the Night: Cheyanne Buys and Melsik Baghdasaryan

== See also ==
- List of UFC events
- List of current UFC fighters
- 2021 in UFC
