= EliteXC: Primetime =

Elite Xtreme Combat MMA event in 2008

- Promotion: Elite Xtreme Combat
- Date: May 31, 2008
- Venue: Prudential Center
- City: Newark, New Jersey

Event chronology
EliteXC: Street Certified	EliteXC: Primetime	EliteXC: Return of the King

EliteXC: Primetime was a mixed martial arts event promoted by Elite Xtreme Combat taking place on May 31, 2008 at the Prudential Center in Newark, New Jersey.

== Background ==
In February 2008, it was announced that EliteXC had reached an agreement with CBS to broadcast live shows on Saturday nights. This marked the first show of the agreement. The main card aired live on CBS, marking the first time a MMA event aired in primetime on major American network television.

As with earlier EliteXC events, the preliminary card aired for free online at Proelite.com.

== Results ==
Main card (CBS)
Weight class				Method	Round	Time	Notes
Heavyweight	Kimbo Slice	def.	James Thompson	TKO (punches)	3	0:38
Middleweight	Robbie Lawler (c)	vs.	Scott Smith	No Contest	3	3:26	(Note: For the Middleweight Championship; Lawler inadvertently poked Smith in the eye.)
Catchweight (144 lbs)	Gina Carano	def.	Kaitlin Young	TKO (doctor stoppage)	2	3:00	(Note: The ringside physician stopped the bout between rounds 2 and 3.)
Middleweight	Joey Villasenor	def.	Phil Baroni	TKO (punches)	1	1:11
Heavyweight	Brett Rogers	def.	Jon Murphy	KO (punch)	1	1:01
Preliminary card
Lightweight	Chris Liguori	def.	Jim Bova	TKO (cut)	2	4:31
Heavyweight	Carlton Haselrig	def.	Carlos Moreno	TKO (corner stoppage)	1	5:00	(Note: Moreno's corner stopped the bout between rounds 2 and 3.)
Lightweight	Matt Makowski	def.	Nick Serra	TKO (Retirement)	2	3:57	(Note: Serra refused to get up from the ground, resulting in the referee ending the fight.)
Bantamweight	Wilson Reis	def.	Justin Robbins	Submission (rear-naked choke)	1	4:06
Bantamweight	James Jones	def.	Calvin Kattar	Submission (rear-naked choke)	1	4:49
Bantamweight	Zach Makovsky	def.	André Soares	Decision (unanimous) (29–28, 29–26, 29–26)	3	5:00
Bantamweight	Joe Sampieri	def.	Mike Groves	TKO (punches)	1	4:58

== Television ratings and coverage ==
In terms of ratings, the show averaged 4.85 million viewers and peaked during the main event at 6.51 million viewers, making it the most watched MMA show in television history until UFC on Fox: Velasquez vs. Dos Santos.

However, not all CBS stations carried the program at the scheduled time. At least five – WBNS-TV in Columbus, Ohio, KXJB-TV in Fargo, North Dakota and three stations in Montana – aired a telethon to benefit the Children's Miracle Network instead. All those stations aired the EliteXC card early the next morning. Also, WFMY-TV in Greensboro, North Carolina and the surrounding Triad area refused to air the program because they disliked the sport – it was passed on to a low-powered independent station, WGSR-LP.

== See also ==
- Elite Xtreme Combat
- 2008 in Elite Xtreme Combat
