= Justin Scoggins =

American mixed martial arts fighter

- Born: May 2, 1992 (age 34); Greenville, South Carolina, U.S.
- Other names: Tank
- Height: 5 ft 7 in (1.70 m)
- Weight: 135 lb (61 kg; 9.6 st)
- Division: Flyweight; Bantamweight
- Reach: 66 in (168 cm)
- Style: Kenpo Karate, Kickboxing, Wrestling, Brazilian Jiu-Jitsu
- Fighting out of: Spartanburg, South Carolina, U.S.
- Team: Revolution MMA; American Top Team
- Rank: Black belt in Kenpō Karate
- Years active: 2010–present

Mixed martial arts record
- Total: 23
- Wins: 16
- By knockout: 8
- By submission: 2
- By decision: 6
- Losses: 7
- By submission: 5
- By decision: 2

Other information
- Mixed martial arts record from Sherdog

Justin Craig Scoggins (born May 2, 1992) is an American mixed martial artist and former full-contact kickboxer currently competing in the Rizin Fighting Federation. A professional mixed martial artist since 2010, Scoggins has previously competed in the Ultimate Fighting Championship.

== Mixed martial arts career ==
=== Early career ===
Scoggins began training in karate at the age of three, later transitioning to wrestling and kickboxing. Aspiring to compete for the UFC, Scoggins opted to drop out of high school and focus solely on honing his skills. He held an amateur MMA record of 6-0-1 before making his professional debut in February 2012, amassing an undefeated record of 7–0 prior to signing with the UFC.

=== Ultimate Fighting Championship ===
==== 2013 ====
In August 2013, the UFC announced they had signed Scoggins to a contract. He was briefly linked to a bout with Dustin Ortiz at UFC Fight Night 27 before it was cancelled.

Scoggins eventually debuted on December 7, 2013, at UFC Fight Night 33 against Richie Vaculik. Scoggins won the fight via TKO in the first round.

For his second fight, Scoggins replaced Darrell Montague against Will Campuzano on March 15, 2014, at UFC 171. Scoggins won the fight via unanimous decision.

==== 2014 ====
For his third fight with the promotion, Scoggins faced Dustin Ortiz on July 6, 2014, at The Ultimate Fighter 19 Finale Scoggins suffered the first loss of his professional MMA career via split decision.

Scoggins next faced John Moraga at UFC Fight Night 50. Scoggins lost the fight via submission in the second round.

==== 2015 ====
Scoggins faced Josh Sampo on May 23, 2015, at UFC 187. Scoggins won the fight via unanimous decision.

Scoggins was expected to face Joby Sanchez on December 11, 2015, at The Ultimate Fighter 22 Finale. However, Scoggins pulled out of the fight in the week leading up to the event and was replaced by Geane Herrera.

==== 2016 ====
Scoggins faced Ray Borg on February 6, 2016, at UFC Fight Night 82. Scoggins won the fight via unanimous decision.

Scoggins was expected to face Ben Nguyen on March 20, 2016, at UFC Fight Night 85. However, Scoggins pulled out of the fight in the week leading up to the event citing injury. As a result, Nguyen was pulled from the card entirely.

Scoggins was expected to face Ian McCall on July 30, 2016, at UFC 201. However, two days before the event, Scoggins announced that he was pulling out of the fight as he was not going to make the contracted weight. As a result, McCall was pulled from the card altogether. Scoggins will now compete at bantamweight full-time.

Scoggins next faced Pedro Munhoz in a bantamweight bout on November 19, 2016, at UFC Fight Night 100. He lost the bout by submission in the second round.

==== 2017 ====
Scoggins faced Ulka Sasaki in a flyweight bout on June 17, 2017, at UFC Fight Night 111. Scoggins lost the fight via rear-naked choke in the second round.

Scoggins was expected to face Tim Elliott on December 16, 2017, at UFC on Fox 26. However on December 3, it was announced that Scoggins was pulled from the fight due to a spinal fracture injury.

==== 2018 ====
Scoggins faced promotional newcomer Said Nurmagomedov on July 14, 2018, at UFC Fight Night 133. He lost the fight via controversial split decision. All 17 media outlets scored the fight for Scoggins.

On November 9, 2018, it was reported that Scoggins was released from the UFC.

=== Rizin FF ===
Scoggins faced Yuki Motoya in a 132lbs catchweight bout at Rizin 14 on December 31, 2018. He lost the bout via submission in the first round.

Scoggins was called on short notice to replace injured Ulka Sasaki, and was expected to face Kai Asakura at Rizin 15. Eventually Scoggins suffered a knee injury which led the bout scrapped from the fight card.

Scoggins stepped in on short notice to replace Erson Yamamoto against Kazuma Sone at Rizin 18 on August 18, 2019. He won the fight via unanimous decision.

=== Post Rizin ===
Scoggins was expected to face Keith Richardson at XMMA^{2} on July 30, 2021. The bout was scrapped when Richardson pulled out for unknown reasons.

Scoggins made his first appearance after a 2 1/2-year break at iKON FC 2 on March 18, 2022, against Eduardo Diez. He won the bout via unanimous decision.

After winning a bout in late 2022 in the Arubian regional scene, Scoggins returned to XMMA on May 3, 2023 at XMMA 6, facing Josh Smith and submitting him in the first round via rear-naked choke.

=== Return to Rizin ===
Scoggins was scheduled to face Mehman Mamedov on November 4, 2023 at Rizin Landmark 7, but was pulled from the fight for medical reasons.

== Personal life ==
Justin was married to Hannah Scoggins, who also is a mixed martial artist.

== Championships and achievements ==
=== Kickboxing ===
- International Kickboxing Federation
  - 2004 North American Classic Championship Tournament (80.1-85 lbs.)

=== Mixed martial arts ===
- Warfare Fighting Championships
  - Warfare FC Flyweight Championship (One time)
  - Two successful title defenses

== Mixed martial arts record ==
Professional record breakdown
23 matches	16 wins	7 losses
By knockout	8	0
By submission	2	5
By decision	6	2

Res.	Record	Opponent	Method	Event	Date	Round	Time	Location	Notes
Win	16–7	Alan Olivas	TKO (body kick and punches)	Synergy FC 23	October 25, 2025	1	0:57	Kansas City, Kansas, United States	
Loss	15–7	Victor Dias	Submission (rear-naked choke)	Ignite Fights: Mecca 22	June 29, 2024	1	3:22	Shakopee, Minnesota, United States	Flyweight bout.
Win	15–6	Josh Smith	Submission (rear-naked choke)	XMMA 6	May 3, 2023	1	2:21	Myrtle Beach, South Carolina, United States	Catchweight (130 lb) bout.
Win	14–6	Jefferson Espinosa	TKO (punches)	Aruba FC 11	November 5, 2022	1	1:06	Oranjestad, Aruba	Return to Bantamweight.
Win	13–6	Eduardo Diez	Decision (unanimous)	Jorge Masvidal's iKon FC 2	March 18, 2022	3	5:00	Miami, Florida, United States	Featherweight debut.
Win	12–6	Kazuma Sone	Decision (unanimous)	Rizin 18	August 18, 2019	3	5:00	Nagoya, Japan	Bantamweight bout.
Loss	11–6	Yuki Motoya	Submission (leg scissor choke)	Rizin 14	December 31, 2018	1	3:27	Saitama, Japan	Catchweight (132 lb) bout.
Loss	11–5	Said Nurmagomedov	Decision (split)	UFC Fight Night: dos Santos vs. Ivanov	July 14, 2018	3	5:00	Boise, Idaho, United States	
Loss	11–4	Ulka Sasaki	Submission (rear-naked choke)	UFC Fight Night: Holm vs. Correia	June 17, 2017	2	3:19	Kallang, Singapore	Return to Flyweight.
Loss	11–3	Pedro Munhoz	Submission (guillotine choke)	UFC Fight Night: Bader vs. Nogueira 2	November 19, 2016	2	1:55	São Paulo, Brazil	Bantamweight debut.
Win	11–2	Ray Borg	Decision (unanimous)	UFC Fight Night: Hendricks vs. Thompson	February 6, 2016	3	5:00	Las Vegas, Nevada, United States	
Win	10–2	Josh Sampo	Decision (unanimous)	UFC 187	May 23, 2015	3	5:00	Las Vegas, Nevada, United States	
Loss	9–2	John Moraga	Submission (guillotine choke)	UFC Fight Night: Jacare vs. Mousasi	September 5, 2014	2	0:47	Mashantucket, Connecticut, United States	
Loss	9–1	Dustin Ortiz	Decision (split)	The Ultimate Fighter: Team Edgar vs. Team Penn Finale	July 6, 2014	3	5:00	Las Vegas, Nevada, United States	
Win	9–0	Will Campuzano	Decision (unanimous)	UFC 171	March 15, 2014	3	5:00	Dallas, Texas, United States	
Win	8–0	Richie Vaculik	TKO (punches)	UFC Fight Night: Hunt vs. Bigfoot	December 7, 2013	1	4:43	Brisbane, Australia	
Win	7–0	Len Cook	TKO (punches)	Warfare 9	June 21, 2013	2	0:18	North Myrtle Beach, South Carolina, United States	Defended the Warfare FC Flyweight Championship.
Win	6–0	Chris Cain	TKO (punches)	Warfare 8	March 8, 2013	1	3:57	North Myrtle Beach, South Carolina, United States	Defended the Warfare FC Flyweight Championship.
Win	5–0	Jacob Hebeisen	TKO (hook kick and punches)	Warfare 7	December 7, 2012	5	3:45	North Myrtle Beach, South Carolina, United States	Won the vacant Warfare FC Flyweight Championship.
Win	4–0	Keith Hulin	TKO (knees and punches)	Warfare 6	August 24, 2012	1	1:00	North Myrtle Beach, South Carolina, United States	
Win	3–0	Casey Large	Submission (armbar)	Extreme Challenge 211	May 12, 2012	1	4:55	Mount Pleasant, South Carolina, United States	
Win	2–0	Timothy Wade	Decision (unanimous)	Quest for Glory 1	March 24, 2012	3	5:00	Greenville, South Carolina, United States	
Win	1–0	Timm Kitts	KO (head kick)	Conflict MMA:Fight Night at the Point 4	February 25, 2012	1	0:23	Mount Pleasant, South Carolina, United States	Flyweight debut.

== Bare knuckle record ==
Professional record breakdown
1 match	0 wins	1 loss
By decision	0	1

Res.	Record	Opponent	Method	Event	Date	Round	Time	Location	Notes
Loss	0–1	Keith Richardson	Decision (unanimous)	BKFC 35	January 27, 2023	5	2:00	Myrtle Beach, South Carolina, United States	

== See also ==
- List of current UFC fighters
- List of male mixed martial artists
