= Zarrukh Adashev =

Uzbek mixed martial artist

- Born: Zarrukh Adashev Bakhtiyorovich; July 29, 1992 (age 34); Samarqand, Uzbekistan
- Other names: The Lion
- Nationality: Uzbek
- Height: 165.1 cm (5 ft 5.0 in)
- Weight: 57–62 kg (126–137 lb)
- Division: Flyweight; Bantamweight
- Style: Kickboxing, Hand-to-hand combat
- Stance: Orthodox
- Fighting out of: New York City, New York, United States
- Team: Lions Fight
- Trainer: Artyom Sahakyan; Mark Henry
- Years active: 2013-present

Kickboxing record
- Total: 19
- Wins: 16
- By knockout: 10
- Losses: 3

Mixed martial arts record
- Total: 9
- Wins: 5
- By knockout: 2
- By decision: 3
- Losses: 4
- By knockout: 2
- By submission: 1
- By decision: 1

Other information
- Mixed martial arts record from Sherdog

Zarrukh Adashev (born July 29, 1992) is an Uzbek professional kickboxer and professional mixed martial artist who competes in the Flyweight division and formerly in the Bantamweight division. He has previously competed in the Ultimate Fighting Championship (UFC) and Bellator MMA.

== Kickboxing career ==
In 2012, Adashev started his professional career in kickboxing and MMA. His professional kickboxing record is 16-3-0

Adashev placed second in the under 75 kg class in the 2012 WKA world championship. He weighed in at 59 kg but fought at 75 kg.

== Mixed martial arts career ==
=== Ring Of Combat ===
Adashev faced Cody Mooney in his professional MMA debut at Ring Of Combat 51 on June 5, 2015. He lost via rear naked choke submission.

=== Bellator MMA ===
Adashev made his Bellator debut against Christian Medina on October 13, 2018, at Bellator 208. He won the fight via TKO in the first round.

Adashev faced Ronie Arana Leon in his sophomore appearance on February 15, 2019, at Bellator 215. He won the fight via unanimous decision.

Adashev faced Tevin Dyce on October 26, 2019, at Bellator 232. He won the fight via TKO in the second round.

=== Ultimate Fighting Championship ===
Adashev faced Tyson Nam, replacing Ryan Benoit on June 13, 2020, at UFC on ESPN: Eye vs. Calvillo. At the weigh-ins, Adashev weighed in at 138.5 pounds, 2.5 pounds over the non-title bantamweight limit of 136 pounds. The bout proceeded as a catchweight and Adashev was fined 20% of his purse. He lost the fight via first-round knockout.

Adashev was scheduled to face Jeff Molina on November 14, 2020, at UFC Fight Night: Felder vs. dos Anjos, before the bout was rescheduled for UFC Fight Night 185. However, Molina withdrew from the event at the end of December 2020. Adashev instead faced Su Mudaerji on January 20, 2021, at UFC on ESPN 20. He lost the fight via unanimous decision.

Adashev was scheduled to face Ryan Benoit on May 8, 2021, at UFC on ESPN 24. At the weigh-ins, Benoit weighed in at 129 pounds, three pounds over the flyweight non-title fight limit. His bout with Adashev was cancelled by the Nevada State Athletic Commission due to health concerns.

Adashev was scheduled to face Juancamilo Ronderos on July 31, 2021, at UFC on ESPN 28. However, Ronderos was removed from the event for undisclosed reasons and was replaced by Ryan Benoit. Adashev won the fight via unanimous decision.

Adashev was scheduled to face Kleydson Rodrigues on January 15, 2022, at UFC on ESPN 32. However, in early January 2022, it was reported that the bout was canceled after Rodrigues tested positive for influenza (H3N2) and Adashev suffered an injury.

Adashev faced Ode' Osbourne on June 4, 2022, at UFC Fight Night 207. He lost the fight via knockout in the first round.

At the end of June, it was announced that he was no longer on the UFC roster.

== Titles and achievements ==
Hand to hand combat

- 2010 - Asian champion in Qarshi
- 2011 - International champion
- 2011 - International champion
- 2012 - WKA World championships silver medalist in Orlando, Florida
- 2013 - WKU K-1 world champion

== Mixed martial arts record ==
Professional record breakdown
9 matches	5 wins	4 losses
By knockout	2	2
By submission	0	1
By decision	3	1

Res.	Record	Opponent	Method	Event	Date	Round	Time	Location	Notes
Win	5–4	Luke Shanks	Decision (unanimous)	UAE Warriors 63	September 10, 2025	3	5:00	Al Ain, United Arab Emirates	Catchweight (130 lb) bout.
Loss	4–4	Ode' Osbourne	KO (punches)	UFC Fight Night: Volkov vs. Rozenstruik	June 4, 2022	1	1:01	Las Vegas, Nevada, United States	
Win	4–3	Ryan Benoit	Decision (unanimous)	UFC on ESPN: Hall vs. Strickland	July 31, 2021	3	5:00	Las Vegas, Nevada, United States	
Loss	3–3	Su Mudaerji	Decision (unanimous)	UFC on ESPN: Chiesa vs. Magny	January 20, 2021	3	5:00	Abu Dhabi, United Arab Emirates	
Loss	3–2	Tyson Nam	KO (punch)	UFC on ESPN: Eye vs. Calvillo	June 13, 2020	1	0:32	Las Vegas, Nevada, United States	Bantamweight bout; Adashev missed weight (138.5 lb).
Win	3–1	Tevin Dyce	TKO (punches)	Bellator 232	October 26, 2019	2	1:39	Uncasville, Connecticut, United States	
Win	2–1	Ronie Arana Leon	Decision (unanimous)	Bellator 215	February 15, 2019	3	5:00	Uncasville, Connecticut, United States	
Win	1–1	Christian Medina	TKO (punches)	Bellator 208	July 29, 2018	1	1:08	Uniondale, New York, United States	Flyweight debut.
Loss	0–1	Cody Mooney	Submission (rear-naked choke)	Ring of Combat 51	June 5, 2015	1	3:41	Atlantic City, New Jersey, United States	Bantamweight debut.

== External References ==
Fight Time.ru Sherdog.com Bellator.com Topology.com MMBoxing.ru

m:Bellator MMA:https://en.wikipedia.org/wiki/Bellator_MMA_in_2018
