= André Soares (fighter) =

Brazilian martial artist

Andre Soares
- Other names: Gigueto
- Nationality: Brazilian
- Weight: 125 lb (57 kg; 8.9 st)
- Division: Flyweight
- Team: Team Gigueto

Mixed martial arts record
- Total: 7
- Wins: 5
- By submission: 4
- By decision: 1
- Losses: 2
- By decision: 2

Other information
- Mixed martial arts record from Sherdog

André "Gigueto" Soares is a Brazilian jiu-jitsu and mixed martial arts fighter. He competes in the flyweight division, and is also an instructor.

== History ==
Shares started training in martial arts at 9 years old practicing Judo. At the age of 15 he fell in love with Brazilian jiu-jitsu. When he was a purple belt he was invited to try out for the Carlson Gracie Competition Team. To make the team there was a tournament style training session in the middle of Carlson Gracie's gym. He won the tournament and became a Team A competitor. His skills grew quickly and he won the Brazilian Nationals in 1998. He trained with Carlson Gracie for five years until Carlson moved to the US and the team split up. Soares followed his teammates over to BTT (Brazilian Top Team) where he competed and received his black belt in 2001. He came in second in the 2002 World Championships.

In 2004, he moved to Florida to reunite with ATT (American Top Team) founder Ricardo Liborio and his master Marcus Aurelio. Soares competed in MMA and jiu-jitsu in America. He won Hawaii Shooto 2005, and took first in the Arnold Schwarzenegger/Gracie World Submission championships.

== Mixed martial arts record ==
Professional record breakdown
7 matches	5 wins	2 losses
By knockout	0	0
By submission	4	0
By decision	1	2

Res.	Record	Opponent	Method	Event	Date	Round	Time	Location	Notes
Loss	5-2	Zach Makovsky	Decision (unanimous)	EliteXC: Primetime	May 31, 2008	3		New Jersey, United States	
Win	5-1	Josh Spearman	Submission (guillotine choke)	BCX 4 - Battle Cage Xtreme 4	April 19, 2008	1	0:19	New Jersey, United States	
Win	4-1	Matt McCabe	Submission (armbar)	CITC 3 - Marked Territory	September 30, 2006	1	1:09	Collins Arena, Brookdale College, Lincroft, NJ.	
Win	3-1	(United States) Ryan Lee	Submission (triangle choke)	Shooto Hawaii - Unleashed	March 25, 2005	1	2:38	Hawaii, United States	
Win	2-1	(United States) Jim Bruketta	Submission (armbar)	FCC 18 - Freestyle Combat Challenge 18	March 5, 2005	1		Wisconsin, United States	
Loss	1-1	(Finland) Tom Niinimaki	Decision	CWFC 9 - Xtreme Xmas	December 18, 2004	3	5:00	England	
Win	1-0	(United States) Ulises Rocha	Decision (unanimous)	IC 8 - Ethereal	November 20, 2004	2	5:00	Indiana, United States	
