= Ryan Benoit =

American mixed martial artist

- Born: August 25, 1989 (age 37); San Diego, California, U.S.
- Other names: Baby Face
- Height: 5 ft 5 in (1.65 m)
- Weight: 125 lb (57 kg; 8 st 13 lb)
- Division: Bantamweight; Flyweight
- Reach: 68 1/2 in (174 cm)
- Fighting out of: Dallas, Texas, United States
- Team: Octagon MMA
- Rank: Black belt in Brazilian Jiu-Jitsu under Diogo Araujo
- Years active: 2009–present

Mixed martial arts record
- Total: 18
- Wins: 10
- By knockout: 8
- By submission: 1
- By decision: 1
- Losses: 8
- By submission: 2
- By decision: 6

Other information
- Mixed martial arts record from Sherdog

Ryan Benoit (born August 25, 1989) is an American mixed martial artist and bare knuckle boxer who competes in the Flyweight division. A professional competitor since 2009, he is currently signed to the BKFC and has competed for the Ultimate Fighting Championship (UFC), Shark Fights, and the MFC.

== Mixed martial arts career ==
=== Early career ===
Benoit began training in 2007 and made his professional MMA debut in May 2009. He fought extensively in his native United States and amassed a record of 7-2 before joining the Ultimate Fighting Championship.

=== Ultimate Fighting Championship ===
Benoit made his promotional debut against fellow newcomer Josh Sampo on November 30, 2013 at The Ultimate Fighter 18 Finale. He lost the back-and-forth fight via rear-naked choke submission late in the second round. Despite the loss, Benoit won a Fight of the Night bonus award for the bout.

Benoit was expected to face Ray Borg on June 28, 2014 at UFC Fight Night 44. However, due to an injury, Benoit was replaced by promotional newcomer Shane Howell.

Benoit faced Sergio Pettis on March 14, 2015 at UFC 185. After a first round in which Pettis seemed to have the upper hand, Benoit dropped Pettis with a left hook and finished him off with a flurry of ground and pound in the second round. Benoit received criticism from fans for kicking Pettis after the referee had separated the two fighters. Benoit immediately apologized for his behavior, claiming he had let his emotions get the better of him. Dana White later stated in the UFC 185 post fight press conference that the UFC wouldn't take any disciplinary actions towards Benoit, due to his immediate regret shown regarding the incident.

Benoit faced Ben Nguyen on November 15, 2015 at UFC 193. He lost the fight via submission in the first round.

Benoit next faced Fredy Serrano on July 30, 2016 at UFC 201. He won the fight via split decision.

Benoit faced Brandon Moreno on December 3, 2016 at The Ultimate Fighter 24 Finale. He lost the fight via split decision.

Benoit faced Ashkan Mokhtarian on November 19, 2017 at UFC Fight Night: Werdum vs. Tybura. At the weight-ins, Benoit weight in at 129 pounds, 3 pounds over the flyweight upper limit of 126 pounds. The bout proceeded at a catchweight and Benoit forfeited 20% of his purse to Mokhtarian. Benoit won the fight via knockout due to a head kick in the third round.

On January 5, 2018 it was announced that Benoit had signed a new, four-fight contract with UFC.

Benoit was expected to face Roberto Sanchez on September 8, 2018 at UFC 228. However, Benoit pulled out of the fight in late August for undisclosed reasons and was replaced by Jarred Brooks.

Benoit faced Alateng Heili in a bantamweight bout on December 21, 2019 at UFC Fight Night 165. He lost the fight via split decision.

Benoit was expected to face Tyson Nam on June 13, 2020 at UFC Fight Night: Eye vs. Calvillo. However, Benoit withdrew from the event for an unknown reason and was replaced by Zarrukh Adashev.

Benoit faced Tim Elliott on July 16, 2020 at UFC Fight Night: Kattar vs. Ige. He lost the fight via unanimous decision.

On September 3, 2020, Benoit along with Roman Dolidze, were granted temporary licenses following special hearings by the Nevada State Athletic Commission after they had recurring issues with the long-term metabolite of Turinabol pulsing in their system in trace amounts, long after ingestion. Both Benoit and Dolidze have already been suspended by USADA, the UFC's anti-doping partner. Neither were facing a violation in Nevada, but the UFC wanted to get ahead of a potential issue. This was after USADA added a threshold for the presence of the M3 metabolite of DHCMT. If a test result is below 100 picograms per milliliter of the substance, it is no longer considered a violation, but an atypical finding—provided there is no evidence of new ingestion or performance-enhancing effects. Benoit and Dolidze were granted temporary licenses to compete beginning Dec. 1 following a six-month period of bimonthly testing by USADA. For Benoit, the process already cost him more than one year of his career after he originally tested positive for low levels of DHCMT (oral turinabol) starting on Nov. 11, 2018. At the time, Benoit tested positive for 30 picograms per mL at the time.

Benoit was scheduled to face Zarrukh Adashev on May 8, 2021 at UFC on ESPN 24. At the weigh-ins, Benoit weighed in at 129 pounds, three pounds over the flyweight non-title fight limit. His bout with Adashev was cancelled by the Nevada State Athletic Commission due to health concerns. The pair was rebooked at UFC on ESPN 28 on July 31, 2021. Benoit lost the fight via unanimous decision.

On August 21, 2021, it was announced Benoit was released by the UFC.

On October 20, 2021, The Nevada Athletic Commission suspended Benoit nine months retroactive to a positive urine sample collected on July 31. Benoit was flagged for modafinil, more commonly known as provigil. In addition to his suspension, Benoit faced a total of $3,445.36 in fines and legal fees. He was eligible to return on April 1, 2022.

== Championships and achievements ==
- Ultimate Fighting Championship
  - Fight of the Night (One time) vs. Josh Sampo
  - UFC.com Awards
    - 2015: Ranked #3 Upset of the Year vs. Sergio Pettis

== Mixed martial arts record ==
Professional record breakdown
18 matches	10 wins	8 losses
By knockout	8	0
By submission	1	2
By decision	1	6

Res.	Record	Opponent	Method	Event	Date	Round	Time	Location	Notes
Loss	10–8	Zarrukh Adashev	Decision (unanimous)	UFC on ESPN: Hall vs. Strickland	July 31, 2021	3	5:00	Las Vegas, Nevada, United States	
Loss	10–7	Tim Elliott	Decision (unanimous)	UFC on ESPN: Kattar vs. Ige	July 16, 2020	3	5:00	Abu Dhabi, United Arab Emirates	
Loss	10–6	Alateng Heili	Decision (split)	UFC Fight Night: Edgar vs. The Korean Zombie	December 21, 2019	3	5:00	Busan, South Korea	Bantamweight bout.
Win	10–5	Ashkan Mokhtarian	KO (head kick)	UFC Fight Night: Werdum vs. Tybura	November 19, 2017	3	2:38	Sydney, Australia	Catchweight (129 lb) bout; Benoit missed weight.
Loss	9–5	Brandon Moreno	Decision (split)	The Ultimate Fighter: Tournament of Champions Finale	December 3, 2016	3	5:00	Las Vegas, Nevada, United States	
Win	9–4	Fredy Serrano	Decision (split)	UFC 201	July 30, 2016	3	5:00	Atlanta, Georgia, United States	
Loss	8–4	Ben Nguyen	Submission (rear-naked choke)	UFC 193	November 15, 2015	1	2:35	Melbourne, Australia	
Win	8–3	Sergio Pettis	TKO (punches)	UFC 185	March 14, 2015	2	1:34	Dallas, Texas, United States	
Loss	7–3	Josh Sampo	Submission (rear-naked choke)	The Ultimate Fighter: Team Rousey vs. Team Tate Finale	November 30, 2013	2	4:31	Las Vegas, Nevada, United States	Flyweight debut; Sampo missed weight (127.5 lb). Fight of the Night.
Win	7–2	Cody Fuller	TKO (punches)	Legacy FC 24	October 11, 2013	1	4:53	Dallas, Texas, United States	Catchweight (130 lb) bout.
Loss	6–2	Anthony Birchak	Decision (unanimous)	MFC 37	May 10, 2013	3	5:00	Edmonton, Alberta, Canada	
Win	6–1	Joseph Sandoval	TKO (punches)	Legacy FC 16	December 14, 2012	1	1:02	Dallas, Texas, United States	
Win	5–1	Randy Villarreal	TKO (punches)	Legacy FC 13	August 16, 2012	1	1:35	Dallas, Texas, United States	
Win	4–1	Cody Williams	Submission (rear-naked choke)	Legacy FC 11	May 11, 2012	2	2:52	Houston, Texas, United States	
Win	3–1	Matt Espinoza	TKO (punches)	Shark Fights 14: Horwich vs. Villefort	March 11, 2011	2	2:14	Lubbock, Texas, United States	
Loss	2–1	Tim Snyder	Decision (majority)	SWC 11: Fury	June 19, 2010	3	5:00	Frisco, Texas, United States	
Win	2–0	Davis Sylvester	TKO (punches)	KOK 7: Judgement Day	August 29, 2009	2	2:41	Austin, Texas, United States	
Win	1–0	LeJerrian Lindley	TKO (punches)	Xtreme Knockout 4	May 9, 2009	1	2:09	Arlington, Texas, United States	

== Bare knuckle boxing record ==
Professional record breakdown
1 match	0 wins	1 loss
By knockout	0	1

Res.	Record	Opponent	Method	Event	Date	Round	Time	Location	Notes
Loss	0–1	John Dodson	KO (punch)	BKFC 28	August 27, 2022	1	0:40	Albuquerque, New Mexico, United States	

== See also ==
- List of male mixed martial artists
