= Josh Sampo =

American mixed martial artist

- Born: July 24, 1984 (age 42); Las Vegas, Nevada, U.S.
- Other names: The Gremlin
- Height: 5 ft 4 in (163 cm)
- Weight: 125 lb (57 kg; 8 st 13 lb)
- Division: Flyweight; Bantamweight
- Reach: 64.5 in (164 cm)
- Fighting out of: St. Charles, Missouri, U.S.
- Team: St. Charles MMA; Rodrigo Vaghi Jiu-Jitsu
- Rank: Brown belt in Brazilian Jiu-Jitsu
- Wrestling: NAIA Wrestling
- Years active: 2008–2018

Mixed martial arts record
- Total: 17
- Wins: 11
- By submission: 6
- By decision: 5
- Losses: 6
- By knockout: 1
- By submission: 1
- By decision: 4

Other information
- University: Lindenwood University
- Notable school: Pahranagat Valley High School
- Mixed martial arts record from Sherdog

Josh Sampo (born July 24, 1984) is an American retired mixed martial artist who competed in Ultimate Fighting Championship's flyweight division.

== Mixed martial arts career ==
=== Early career ===
Sampo started his professional career in 2009. He fought mainly for Missouri-based promotions as Fight Me MMA, Wright Fights and Rumble Time Promotions. He is now a high school science teacher at Francis Howell High School in St. Charles county, Missouri.

=== Legacy Fighting Championship ===
Sampo was expected to face Rafael de Freitas on September 14, 2012, at Legacy FC 14. However, instead he faced Antonio Banuelos. He won via unanimous decision (30–27, 30–27, 30–27) .

=== Championship Fighting Alliance ===
Sampo faced Olympic medallist and Bellator MMA veteran Alexis Vila on January 19, 2013, at CFA 9: Night of Champions for the inaugural flyweight title. Sampo defeated Vila via submission due to a guillotine choke in the fifth round and became the CFA flyweight champion.

Sampo defended his title once against Sam Thao on October 12, 2013, at CFA 12: Sampo vs. Thao. He won via unanimous decision (49–46, 49–46, 49–46) after five rounds.

In November 2013, it was announced that Sampo had signed with the UFC.

=== Ultimate Fighting Championship ===
Sampo made his promotional debut against fellow newcomer Ryan Benoit on November 30, 2013, at The Ultimate Fighter 18 Finale. Sampo won via submission due to a rear-naked choke and the performance earned both participants Fight of the Night honors, but Sampo was not eligible for the bonus due to missing weight.

Sampo faced Zach Makovsky on February 22, 2014, at UFC 170. Sampo had his first octagon defeat via unanimous decision (30–27, 30–27, 29–28).

Sampo faced promotional newcomer Paddy Holohan on July 19, 2014, at UFC Fight Night: McGregor vs. Brandao. He lost via submission due to a rear-naked choke in the first round.

Sampo faced Justin Scoggins on May 23, 2015, at UFC 187. Sampo lost the fight via unanimous decision. Subsequently, he was released from the promotion.

=== Bellator MMA ===
Sampo faced Dominic Mazzotta at Bellator 197 on April 13, 2018. He lost the fight by unanimous decision.

== Championships and accomplishments ==
=== Mixed martial arts ===
- Ultimate Fighting Championship
  - Fight of the Night (one time) vs. Ryan Benoit
- Championship Fighting Alliance
  - CFA flyweight title (one time)
  - One successful title defense
- Cage Championships
  - CC amateur bantamweight title (one time)
- Fight Matrix
  - 2012 Most Improved Fighter of the Year

=== Amateur wrestling ===
- National Association of Intercollegiate Athletics
  - NAIA Wrestling National Championship All-American out of Lindenwood University (2005, 2006, 2007)
  - NAIA Wrestling National Championship 125 lb: Fourth place out of Lindenwood University (2006)
  - NAIA Wrestling National Championship 125 lb: Fifth place out of Lindenwood University (2005, 2007)
- Nevada Interscholastic Activities Association
  - Nevada State High School Wrestling 103 lb: Champion out of Pahranagat Valley High School (2001)
  - Nevada State High School Wrestling 112 lb: Champion out of Pahranagat Valley High School (2002)

== Mixed martial arts record ==
Professional record breakdown
17 matches	11 wins	6 losses
By knockout	0	1
By submission	6	1
By decision	5	4

Res.	Record	Opponent	Method	Event	Date	Round	Time	Location	Notes
Loss	11–6	Dominic Mazzotta	Decision (unanimous)	Bellator 197	April 13, 2018	3	5:00	St. Charles, Missouri, United States	
Loss	11–5	Justin Scoggins	Decision (unanimous)	UFC 187	May 23, 2015	3	5:00	Las Vegas, Nevada, United States	
Loss	11–4	Paddy Holohan	Submission (rear-naked choke)	UFC Fight Night: McGregor vs. Brandao	July 19, 2014	1	3:06	Dublin, Ireland	
Loss	11–3	Zach Makovsky	Decision (unanimous)	UFC 170	February 22, 2014	3	5:00	Las Vegas, Nevada, United States	
Win	11–2	Ryan Benoit	Submission (rear-naked choke)	The Ultimate Fighter 18 Finale	November 30, 2013	2	4:31	Las Vegas, Nevada, United States	Catchweight (127.5 lbs) bout; Sampo missed weight. Fight of the Night.
Win	10–2	Sam Thao	Decision (unanimous)	CFA 12: Sampo vs. Thao	October 12, 2013	5	5:00	Coral Gables, Florida, United States	Defended the CFA Flyweight Championship.
Win	9–2	Alexis Vila	Submission (guillotine choke)	CFA 9: Night of Champions	January 19, 2013	5	2:26	Coral Gables, Florida, United States	Won the inaugural CFA Flyweight Championship.
Win	8–2	Antonio Banuelos	Decision (unanimous)	Legacy FC 14	September 14, 2012	3	5:00	Houston, Texas, United States	
Win	7–2	Carson Gainey	Submission (kimura)	Rumble Time Promotions: Clash of the Warriors	July 27, 2012	1	1:23	St. Charles, Missouri, United States	
Loss	6–2	Will Campuzano	KO (knee)	Rumble Time Promotions	May 19, 2012	3	1:18	St. Charles, Missouri, United States	
Win	6–1	Czar Sklavos	Decision (unanimous)	Fight Me MMA	April 13, 2012	3	5:00	St. Charles, Missouri, United States	
Win	5–1	Gor Mnatsakanyan	Decision (unanimous)	UFF: X	November 5, 2011	3	5:00	Salina, Kansas, United States	
Win	4–1	Jeremy Freeman	Submission (leg triangle)	Wright Fights 4	July 16, 2011	1	3:12	St. Charles, Missouri, United States	
Loss	3–1	Mike French	Decision (unanimous)	Wright Fights 2	May 11, 2011	3	5:00	St. Charles, Missouri, United States	
Win	3–0	Eric Acuna	Decision (unanimous)	Fight Me MMA 1: The Battle Begins	August 14, 2010	3	5:00	St. Charles, Missouri, United States	
Win	2–0	Jake Rosenbaum	Submission (rear-naked choke)	Hoosier FC 4: Showdown at the Steel Yard	June 11, 2010	3	0:57	Gary, Indiana, United States	
Win	1–0	Josh Phillips	Submission (rear-naked choke)	Friday Night Fight Night	November 6, 2009	1	4:35	Sedalia, Missouri, United States	

=== Mixed martial arts amateur record ===
Res.	Record	Opponent	Method	Event	Date	Round	Time	Location	Notes
Win	4–0	Chris Butler	TKO (strikes)	Xtreme Fight League	May 9, 2009	1	1:17	St. Louis, Missouri, United States	
Win	3–0	Albert Mendoza	Submission (strikes)	Cage Championships 16	March 14, 2009	2	1:29	Sullivan, Missouri, United States	Won CC amateur bantamweight title.
Win	2–0	Robert Peralez	N/A	Midwest Fight League: Battle at the Bluenote 6	May 2, 2008	N/A	N/A	Columbia, Missouri, United States	
Win	1–0	Jon Hollis	TKO	Midwest Fight Fest	March 22, 2008	1	N/A	St. Louis, Missouri, United States	

== See also ==
- List of current UFC fighters
- List of male mixed martial artists
