= John Moraga =

American mixed martial artist

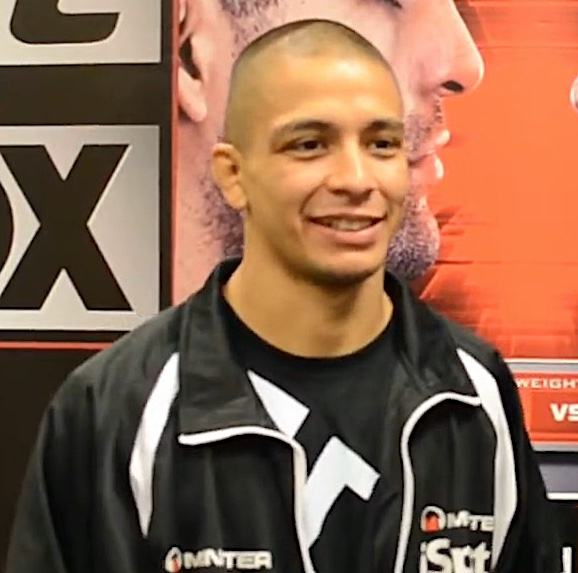
- Born: March 20, 1984 (age 42); Phoenix, Arizona, United States
- Nickname: Chicano
- Height: 5 ft 6 in (1.68 m)
- Weight: 125 lb (57 kg; 8.9 st)
- Division: Flyweight; Bantamweight; Featherweight
- Reach: 66 in (168 cm)
- Stance: Orthodox
- Fighting out of: Phoenix, Arizona, United States
- Team: Arizona Combat Sports; MMA Lab
- Wrestling: NCAA Division I Wrestling
- Years active: 2009–present (MMA); 2012, 2019–present (boxing)

Professional boxing record
- Total: 4
- Wins: 1
- By knockout: 1
- Losses: 3
- By knockout: 1

Mixed martial arts record
- Total: 26
- Wins: 19
- By knockout: 3
- By submission: 8
- By decision: 8
- Losses: 7
- By knockout: 2
- By submission: 1
- By decision: 4

Other information
- University: Arizona State University
- Notable school: Maryvale High School
- Boxing record from BoxRec
- Mixed martial arts record from Sherdog

John Anthony Moraga (born March 20, 1984) is an American mixed martial artist and amateur wrestler who competed as a flyweight. He is best known for his lengthy career in the Ultimate Fighting Championship (UFC), which saw him challenge for the UFC Flyweight Championship in 2013.

== Background ==
Moraga was born and raised in Phoenix, Arizona. He is of Mexican descent. Moraga attended Maryvale High School and then chose to go to Arizona State University where he was a two-time University Freestyle All-American wrestler for the Sun Devils. He graduated from Arizona State University with a degree in interdisciplinary studies.

== Mixed martial arts career ==
Moraga started his professional career at 2009 in Arizona for the local organization Rage in the Cage. There he achieved an undefeated record of 6–0, until his fight against John Dodson in 2010, in which he lost via unanimous decision. He then won five straight bouts, and was signed by the UFC in 2012.

=== Ultimate Fighting Championship ===
Moraga was expected his promotional debut against Ian McCall on August 4, 2012 at UFC on Fox 4. However, McCall was forced out of the bout with an injury and replaced by Ulysses Gomez. Moraga won the fight via KO in the first round.

Moraga next faced Chris Cariaso on December 29, 2012 at UFC 155. Moraga was victorious with a third round guillotine choke submission. His victory also earned him Submission of the Night honors.

Moraga was expected to face UFC Flyweight Champion Demetrious Johnson for the title on April 13, 2013 at The Ultimate Fighter 17 Finale. However, Johnson was forced out of the bout with an injury and Moraga was removed from the event as well.

Moraga eventually faced Demetrious Johnson at UFC on Fox 8 on July 27, 2013. Moraga showed promise in the first round as he landed some good strikes standing. However, the champion began to wear him down with his wrestling. Despite hurting Johnson in the fourth round with a punch, he lost the fight via submission in the fifth round.

Moraga was expected to face Darren Uyenoyama on December 14, 2013 at UFC on Fox 9. However, Moraga pulled out of the bout with an undisclosed injury and was replaced by promotional newcomer Alptekin Ozkilic.

Moraga faced Dustin Ortiz on January 15, 2014 at UFC Fight Night 35. He won the fight via split decision.

A rematch with John Dodson took place on June 7, 2014 at UFC Fight Night 42. He lost the fight via TKO due to a doctor stoppage between rounds two and three after a knee Dodson threw late in the second round broke Moraga's nose.

Moraga faced Justin Scoggins on September 5, 2014 at UFC Fight Night 50. Moraga defeated Scoggins via submission in the second round, securing a guillotine choke after being taken down.

Moraga was expected to face Jussier Formiga on December 13, 2014 at UFC on Fox 13. However, Formiga pulled out of the fight on November 21 and was replaced by Willie Gates. Moraga won the fight via submission in the third round.

Moraga faced Joseph Benavidez on May 23, 2015 at UFC 187. Moraga lost the back and forth fight via unanimous decision.

Moraga faced Matheus Nicolau on July 8, 2016 at The Ultimate Fighter 23 Finale He lost the fight via split decision.

Moraga was expected to face Zach Makovsky on December 10, 2016 at UFC 206. However, Moraga pulled out of the fight in early November citing injury and was replaced by Dustin Ortiz.

Moraga next faced Sergio Pettis on January 15, 2017 at UFC Fight Night 103. He lost the fight via unanimous decision.

Moraga faced promotional newcomer Ashkan Mokhtarian on June 11, 2017 at UFC Fight Night 110. He won the one-sided fight by unanimous decision.

Moraga faced Magomed Bibulatov on October 7, 2017 at UFC 216. He won the fight via knockout in the first round. This win earned him the Performance of the Night award.

Moraga faced Wilson Reis on April 14, 2018 at UFC on Fox 29. He won the fight via unanimous decision.

Moraga faced Deiveson Figueiredo on August 25, 2018 at UFC Fight Night 135. He lost the fight via TKO in the second round.

On February 7, 2019, it was reported that Moraga was released from the UFC, which would be confirmed by then-UFC Flyweight Champion Henry Cejudo.

=== Post-UFC career ===
Moraga was supposed to face Hector Sandoval at ARES 2 on April 3, 2020. However, due to the COVID-19 pandemic, the event was postponed until October 30, 2020, before being cancelled altogether.

== Professional boxing career ==
Just before joining ranks of the UFC, Moraga made his professional boxing debut against Jose Marrufo, losing the bout via unanimous decision.

After he was released from the UFC in 2019, he continued with his boxing career by defeating Brandon Foss via technical knockout in the second round.

== Championships and accomplishments ==
=== Amateur wrestling ===
- USA Wrestling
  - University Freestyle All-American out of Arizona State University (2006–07)
  - University Freestyle National Championship 133 lb: 6th place out of Arizona State University (2006–07)
- National Collegiate Athletic Association
  - Pac-10 Conference 125 lb: 4th place out of Arizona State University (2007)
  - Pac-10 Conference 133 lb: 6th place out of Arizona State University (2004)

=== Mixed martial arts ===
- Ultimate Fighting Championship
  - Submission of the Night (One time) vs. Chris Cariaso
  - Performance of the Night (One time) vs. Magomed Bibulatov
  - Seventh most finishes in UFC Flyweight division history (5)
  - UFC.com Awards
    - 2012: Ranked #6 Newcomer of the Year
- Rage in the Cage
  - Rage in the Cage Bantamweight Crown (2012)
- Trilogy Championship Fighting
  - Trilogy Championship Fighting Bantamweight Champion (2011)
- Sherdog
  - 2013 All-Violence First Team

== Mixed martial arts record ==
Professional record breakdown
25 matches	17 wins	8 losses
By knockout	2	2
By submission	8	1
By decision	7	5

Res.	Record	Opponent	Method	Event	Date	Round	Time	Location	Notes
Loss	19–7	Deiveson Figueiredo	TKO (punches)	UFC Fight Night: Gaethje vs. Vick	August 25, 2018	2	3:08	Lincoln, Nebraska, United States	
Win	19–6	Wilson Reis	Decision (unanimous)	UFC on Fox: Poirier vs. Gaethje	April 14, 2018	3	5:00	Glendale, Arizona, United States	
Win	18–6	Magomed Bibulatov	KO (punch)	UFC 216	October 7, 2017	1	1:38	Las Vegas, Nevada, United States	Performance of the Night.
Win	17–6	Ashkan Mokhtarian	Decision (unanimous)	UFC Fight Night: Lewis vs. Hunt	June 11, 2017	3	5:00	Auckland, New Zealand	
Loss	16–6	Sergio Pettis	Decision (unanimous)	UFC Fight Night: Rodríguez vs. Penn	January 17, 2017	3	5:00	Phoenix, Arizona, United States	
Loss	16–5	Matheus Nicolau	Decision (split)	The Ultimate Fighter: Team Joanna vs. Team Cláudia Finale	July 8, 2016	3	5:00	Las Vegas, Nevada, United States	
Loss	16–4	Joseph Benavidez	Decision (unanimous)	UFC 187	May 23, 2015	3	5:00	Las Vegas, Nevada, United States	
Win	16–3	Willie Gates	Submission (rear-naked choke)	UFC on Fox: dos Santos vs. Miocic	December 13, 2014	3	4:06	Phoenix, Arizona, United States	
Win	15–3	Justin Scoggins	Submission (guillotine choke)	UFC Fight Night: Jacare vs. Mousasi	September 5, 2014	2	0:47	Mashantucket, Connecticut, United States	
Loss	14–3	John Dodson	TKO (doctor stoppage)	UFC Fight Night: Henderson vs. Khabilov	June 7, 2014	2	5:00	Albuquerque, New Mexico, United States	
Win	14–2	Dustin Ortiz	Decision (split)	UFC Fight Night: Rockhold vs. Philippou	January 15, 2014	3	5:00	Duluth, Georgia, United States	
Loss	13–2	Demetrious Johnson	Submission (armbar)	UFC on Fox: Johnson vs. Moraga	July 27, 2013	5	3:43	Seattle, Washington, United States	For the UFC Flyweight Championship.
Win	13–1	Chris Cariaso	Submission (guillotine choke)	UFC 155	December 29, 2012	3	1:11	Las Vegas, Nevada, United States	Submission of the Night.
Win	12–1	Ulysses Gomez	KO (elbows and punches)	UFC on Fox: Shogun vs. Vera	August 4, 2012	1	3:46	Los Angeles, California, United States	Flyweight debut.
Win	11–1	Jose Carbajal	Decision (unanimous)	Cage Rage: On the River 2	July 7, 2012	3	5:00	Parker, Arizona, United States	
Win	10–1	Maurice Senters	Decision (unanimous)	Rage in the Cage 160	June 22, 2012	3	5:00	Chandler, Arizona, United States	Won the RITC Bantamweight Championship.
Win	9–1	Matthew Garcia	Submission (armbar)	Coalition of Combat: The Bangers Ball	February 25, 2012	1	3:10	Phoenix, Arizona, United States	
Win	8–1	Freddie Lux	Submission (guillotine choke)	Trilogy Championship Fighting: Rumble at the Ranch 2	November 5, 2011	1	0:49	Phoenix, Arizona, United States	Won the TCF Bantamweight Championship.
Win	7–1	Nathaniel Baker	Submission (armbar)	Martinez Brothers Production: Sun City Battle	July 9, 2011	3	2:27	El Paso, Texas, United States	
Loss	6–1	John Dodson	Decision (unanimous)	Nemesis Fighting: MMA Global Invasion	December 11, 2010	3	5:00	Punta Cana, Dominican Republic	
Win	6–0	Aldo Escudero	Decision (unanimous)	Rage in the Cage 143	July 31, 2010	3	5:00	Phoenix, Arizona, United States	
Win	5–0	Travis Halverson	Submission (guillotine choke)	Rage in the Cage 142	June 26, 2010	1	1:17	Chandler, Arizona, United States	
Win	4–0	Pat Donovan	Submission (triangle choke)	Rage in the Cage 140	March 20, 2010	2	1:12	Chandler, Arizona, United States	
Win	3–0	Evan Morton	Decision (unanimous)	Rage in the Cage 139	February 13, 2010	3	3:00	Tucson, Arizona, United States	
Win	2–0	Al Decastro	TKO (punches)	Rage in the Cage 138	December 4, 2009	1	1:15	Mesa, Arizona, United States	
Win	1–0	Sam Shapiro	Decision (unanimous)	Rage in the Cage 136	November 7, 2009	3	3:00	Prescott Valley, Arizona, United States	

== Professional boxing record ==
4 fights	1 win	3 losses
By knockout	1	1
By decision	0	2

No.	Result	Record	Opponent	Type	Round, time	Date	Location	Notes
4	Loss	1–3	(United States) Marc Castro	TKO	2 (4), 2:29	27 Feb 2021	(United States) Hard Rock Stadium, Miami Gardens, Florida, U.S.	
3	Loss	1–2	(United States) Duke Ragan	UD	4	3 Oct 2020	(United States) MGM Grand Conference Center, Paradise, Nevada, U.S.	
2	Win	1–1	(United States) Brandon Foss	TKO	2 (4), 1:30	12 Oct 2019	(United States) Wild Horse Pass Hotel & Casino, Chandler, Arizona, US	
1	Loss	0–1	(Mexico) Jose Marrufo	UD	4	12 Apr 2012	(United States) El Zaribah Shriners Auditorium, Phoenix, Arizona, US	

== See also ==
- List of current UFC fighters
- List of male mixed martial artists
