= Jussier Formiga =

Brazilian martial artist (born 1985)

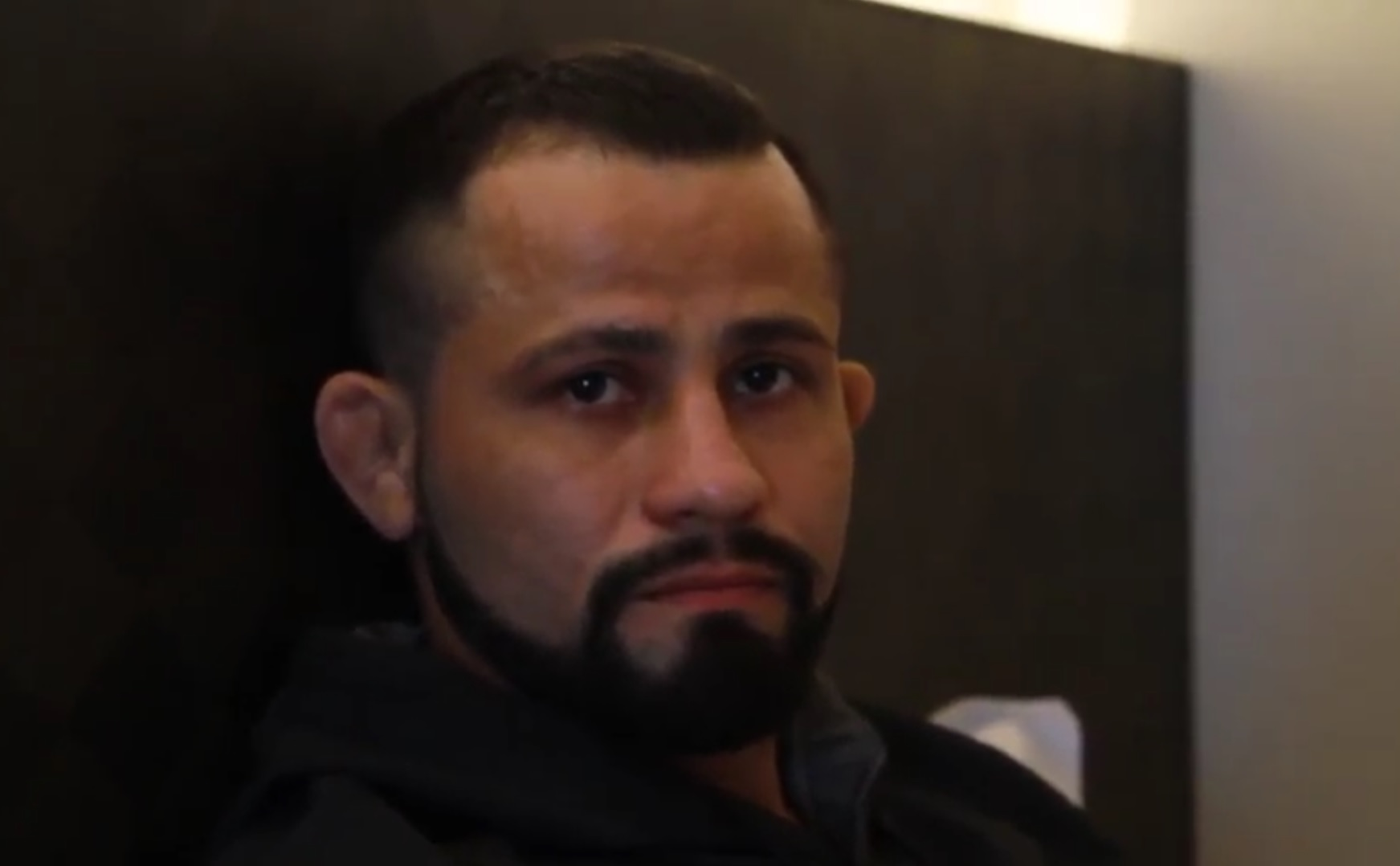
- Born: April 14, 1985 (age 41); Natal, Rio Grande do Norte, Brazil
- Other names: Formiga (Ant)
- Height: 5 ft 5 in (1.65 m)
- Weight: 125 lb (57 kg; 8 st 13 lb)
- Division: Flyweight
- Reach: 67 in (170 cm)
- Fighting out of: Natal, Rio Grande do Norte, Brazil; Coconut Creek, Florida, United States
- Team: Nova União/Kimura (formerly); American Top Team (2018–present)
- Rank: Black belt in Brazilian Jiu-Jitsu; Black belt in Judo
- Years active: 2005–present

Mixed martial arts record
- Total: 32
- Wins: 24
- By submission: 11
- By decision: 13
- Losses: 8
- By knockout: 4
- By decision: 4

Other information
- Mixed martial arts record from Sherdog

Jussier Formiga (born April 14, 1985) is a Brazilian mixed martial artist who competes in the Flyweight division. A professional competitor since 2005, Formiga most notably competed in the UFC and is the former Shooto South America 123-pound champion.

== Mixed martial arts career ==
=== Shooto Brazil ===
Formiga won his professional mixed martial arts debut fight on November 29, 2008 at Shooto: Brazil 9 against Michael Willian Costa via split decision. This was followed up by an upset victory over Shinichi "BJ" Kojima via unanimous decision at Shooto: Revolutionary Exchanges 1: Undefeated.

It was expected Formiga would be brought back for a year-end title rematch with Kojima. However, Kojima vacated the Shooto Bantamweight Championship, further complicating Jussier's future with the organization.

Formiga was at this point, ranked as the number one Flyweight in the world and then fought Alexandre Pantoja, who was unbeaten as a Flyweight. On June 12, 2010, Formiga defeated Pantoja by unanimous decision to defend his South America Shooto 123 lb Championship.

=== Tachi Palace Fights ===
Formiga signed a four-fight exclusive contract with the California-based Tachi Palace Fights organization. His first fight with the organization was against WEC veteran Danny Martinez at Tachi Palace Fights 7. Formiga won the fight by unanimous decision.

Fomiga's next fight was against another WEC veteran in Ian McCall. He lost the fight via unanimous decision.

Formiga next faced top-ranked Flyweight Mamoru Yamaguchi at Tachi Palace Fights 10. He won the fight via unanimous decision.

=== Ultimate Fighting Championship ===
On July 14, 2012 it was announced that Formiga signed with the UFC.

Formiga faced John Dodson on October 5, 2012 at UFC on FX 5. After a slow first round, Formiga began to succumb to the speed of Dodson, and was eventually finished via TKO with ground strikes at 4:35 of the second round.

Formiga faced Chris Cariaso on May 18, 2013 at UFC on FX 8. He won the fight via unanimous decision.

Formiga faced Joseph Benavidez on September 4, 2013 at UFC Fight Night 28. He lost the fight via TKO in the first round.

Formiga faced Scott Jorgensen on March 23, 2014 at UFC Fight Night 38. Formiga won the fight via submission in the first round. Formiga unintentionally butted Jorgensen's chin with the top of his skull, which went unnoticed by the referee and submitted the dazed Jorgensen via rear-naked choke. Jorgensen appealed the headbutt to the Brazilian Athletic Commission, however the result was upheld.

Formiga was expected to face Zach Makovsky on August 2, 2014 at UFC 176. However, after UFC 176 was cancelled, Formiga/Makovsky was rescheduled and eventually took place on August 16, 2014 at UFC Fight Night 47. Formiga won the fight via unanimous decision.

Formiga was expected to face John Moraga on December 13, 2014 at UFC on Fox 13. However, on November 21, Formiga pulled out of the fight and was replaced by UFC newcomer Willie Gates.

Formiga faced Wilson Reis on May 30, 2015 at UFC Fight Night 67. He won the back-and-forth fight by unanimous decision.

Formiga next faced Henry Cejudo on November 21, 2015 at The Ultimate Fighter Latin America 2 Finale. He lost the fight by split decision.

Formiga faced Dustin Ortiz on September 24, 2016 at UFC Fight Night 95. He won the fight via unanimous decision.

Formiga was expected to face Sergio Pettis on January 15, 2017 at UFC Fight Night 103. However, Formiga pulled out of the fight in late December and was replaced by John Moraga.

Formiga faced Ray Borg on March 11, 2017 at UFC Fight Night 106. He lost the fight via unanimous decision.

After alternating between wins and losses in the latest four fights, Formiga decided to move from his native Brazil to Florida, United States in order to train at American Top Team.

Formiga faced Ulka Sasaki on September 23, 2017 at UFC Fight Night: Saint Preux vs. Okami. He won the fight via submission in the first round.

Formiga faced Ben Nguyen on February 11, 2018 at UFC 221. He won the fight via technical submission in the third round due to a rear-naked choke. This win earned him the Performance of the Night bonus.

Formiga faced Sergio Pettis on October 6, 2018 at UFC 229. He won the fight via unanimous decision.

Formiga faced Deiveson Figueiredo on March 23, 2019 at UFC Fight Night 148. He won the fight via unanimous decision.

Formiga faced Joseph Benavidez in a rematch on June 29, 2019 at UFC on ESPN 3. He lost the fight via technical knockout in the second round.

Formiga faced Brandon Moreno on March 14, 2020 at UFC Fight Night 170. He lost the fight via unanimous decision.

Formiga faced Alex Perez on June 6, 2020 at UFC 250. He lost the bout via first round technical knockout.

On November 16, 2020, it was announced that Formiga had been released from his UFC contract and is now a free agent.

=== Post-UFC career ===
After the release from the UFC, Formiga headlined LFA 124 against Felipe Bunes on February 11, 2022. He won the fight via technical submission due to a rear-naked choke in the second round.

== Grappling career ==
Formiga competed against Tagir Ulanbekov in the co-main event of ADXC 6 on October 25, 2024. He won the match by unanimous decision.

== Championships and awards ==
- Shooto South America
  - Shooto South American 123 lb Championship
- Ultimate Fighting Championship
  - Performance of the Night (One time) vs Ben Nguyen
  - Fifth most bouts in UFC Flyweight division history (16)

== Mixed martial arts record ==
Professional record breakdown
32 matches	24 wins	8 losses
By knockout	0	4
By submission	11	0
By decision	13	4

Res.	Record	Opponent	Method	Event	Date	Round	Time	Location	Notes
Win	24–8	Felipe Bunes	Technical Submission (rear-naked choke)	LFA 124	February 11, 2022	2	1:53	Phoenix, Arizona, United States	Bantamweight debut; Formiga missed weight (139 lb).
Loss	23–8	Alex Perez	TKO (leg kicks)	UFC 250	June 6, 2020	1	4:06	Las Vegas, Nevada, United States	
Loss	23–7	Brandon Moreno	Decision (unanimous)	UFC Fight Night: Lee vs. Oliveira	March 14, 2020	3	5:00	Brasília, Brazil	
Loss	23–6	Joseph Benavidez	TKO (head kick and punches)	UFC on ESPN: Ngannou vs. dos Santos	June 29, 2019	2	4:47	Minneapolis, Minnesota, United States	
Win	23–5	Deiveson Figueiredo	Decision (unanimous)	UFC Fight Night: Thompson vs. Pettis	March 23, 2019	3	5:00	Nashville, Tennessee, United States	
Win	22–5	Sergio Pettis	Decision (unanimous)	UFC 229	October 6, 2018	3	5:00	Las Vegas, Nevada, United States	
Win	21–5	Ben Nguyen	Technical Submission (rear-naked choke)	UFC 221	February 11, 2018	3	1:43	Perth, Australia	Performance of the Night.
Win	20–5	Ulka Sasaki	Submission (rear-naked choke)	UFC Fight Night: Saint Preux vs. Okami	September 23, 2017	1	4:30	Saitama, Japan	
Loss	19–5	Ray Borg	Decision (unanimous)	UFC Fight Night: Belfort vs. Gastelum	March 11, 2017	3	5:00	Fortaleza, Brazil	
Win	19–4	Dustin Ortiz	Decision (unanimous)	UFC Fight Night: Cyborg vs. Lansberg	September 24, 2016	3	5:00	Brasília, Brazil	
Loss	18–4	Henry Cejudo	Decision (split)	The Ultimate Fighter Latin America 2 Finale: Magny vs. Gastelum	November 21, 2015	3	5:00	Monterrey, Mexico	
Win	18–3	Wilson Reis	Decision (unanimous)	UFC Fight Night: Condit vs. Alves	May 30, 2015	3	5:00	Goiânia, Brazil	
Win	17–3	Zach Makovsky	Decision (unanimous)	UFC Fight Night: Bader vs. Saint Preux	August 16, 2014	3	5:00	Bangor, Maine, United States	
Win	16–3	Scott Jorgensen	Submission (rear-naked choke)	UFC Fight Night: Shogun vs. Henderson 2	March 23, 2014	1	3:07	Natal, Brazil	
Loss	15–3	Joseph Benavidez	TKO (knee to the body and punches)	UFC Fight Night: Teixeira vs. Bader	September 4, 2013	1	3:07	Belo Horizonte, Brazil	
Win	15–2	Chris Cariaso	Decision (unanimous)	UFC on FX: Belfort vs. Rockhold	May 18, 2013	3	5:00	Jaraguá do Sul, Brazil	
Loss	14–2	John Dodson	TKO (punches)	UFC on FX: Browne vs. Bigfoot	October 5, 2012	2	4:35	Minneapolis, Minnesota, United States	UFC Flyweight title eliminator.
Win	14–1	Sidney Oliveira	Submission (rear-naked choke)	Shooto Brazil 31	June 29, 2012	1	2:45	Brasília, Brazil	
Win	13–1	Martin Coria	Submission (triangle choke)	Coliseu Extreme Fight	March 18, 2012	3	2:11	Maceió, Brazil	
Win	12–1	Rodrigo Santos	Submission (rear-naked choke)	Fort MMA Championships 1	December 15, 2011	1	3:52	Natal, Brazil	
Win	11–1	Michael Willian	Submission (rear-naked choke)	Shooto Brazil 26	October 29, 2011	2	4:55	Rio de Janeiro, Brazil	Defended the Shooto South American 123 lbs Championship.
Win	10–1	Mamoru Yamaguchi	Decision (unanimous)	Tachi Palace Fights 10	August 5, 2011	3	5:00	Lemoore, California, United States	
Loss	9–1	Ian McCall	Decision (unanimous)	TPF 8: All or Nothing	February 18, 2011	3	5:00	Lemoore, California, United States	
Win	9–0	Danny Martinez	Decision (unanimous)	Tachi Palace Fights 7	December 2, 2010	3	5:00	Lemoore, California, United States	
Win	8–0	Alexandre Pantoja	Decision (unanimous)	Shooto Brazil 16	June 12, 2010	3	5:00	Rio de Janeiro, Brazil	Defended the Shooto South American 123 lbs Championship.
Win	7–0	Shinichi Kojima	Decision (unanimous)	Shooto Revolutionary Exchanges 1: Undefeated	July 19, 2009	3	5:00	Tokyo, Japan	
Win	6–0	Michael Willian	Decision (split)	Shooto Brazil 9	November 29, 2008	3	5:00	Fortaleza, Brazil	Won the Shooto South American 123 lbs Championship.
Win	5–0	Ralph Lauren	Submission (rear-naked choke)	Shooto Brazil 8	August 30, 2008	1	1:46	Rio de Janeiro, Brazil	
Win	4–0	Jose Maria Tome	Submission (rear-naked choke)	Original Bairros Fight 7	March 9, 2008	1	3:41	Natal, Brazil	
Win	3–0	Arinaldo Batista	Decision (unanimous)	Hikari Fight	January 14, 2006	3	5:00	Natal, Brazil	
Win	2–0	Amaury Junior	Decision (unanimous)	Mossoró Fight	August 26, 2005	3	5:00	Mossoró, Brazil	
Win	1–0	Chacal Chacal	Submission (armbar)	Tremons Fight	May 13, 2005	1	3:20	Natal, Brazil	

== See also ==
- List of male mixed martial artists
