= Ashkan Mokhtarian =

Australian MMA fighter

- Born: 18 September 1985 (age 41); Tehran, Iran
- Other names: The Assassin
- Nationality: Iranian (until 2019); Australian (since 2019)
- Height: 5 ft 6 in (1.68 m)
- Weight: 125 lb (57 kg; 8 st 13 lb)
- Division: Featherweight; Bantamweight; Flyweight
- Style: BJJ, Kickboxing
- Fighting out of: Sydney, Australia
- Team: Australian Top Team
- Teacher: Mohamed Aghzi
- Rank: Purple belt in Brazilian Jiu-Jitsu
- Years active: 2011–2019

Mixed martial arts record
- Total: 17
- Wins: 13
- By knockout: 6
- By submission: 6
- By decision: 1
- Losses: 4
- By knockout: 1
- By submission: 1
- By decision: 2

Other information
- Mixed martial arts record from Sherdog

Ashkan Mokhtarian (Persian: اشکان مختاریان, born 18 September 1985 Tehran, Iran) is an Iranian-born Australian former mixed martial artist, who formerly competed in the Ultimate Fighting Championship.

== Background ==
Mokhtarian's parents fled Iran during the Iran–Iraq War in 1985 and came to Australia as refugees. When Mokhtarian and his younger brother Suman were young, their parents divorced. Ashkan got involved with drugs and alcohol during his teenage years and decided to become a professional MMA fighter after watching the sport on TV.

Ashkan and Suman Mokhtarian founded the Australian Top Team located in Wentworthville, NSW, which has no affiliation or association with the American Top Team.

== Mixed martial arts career ==
=== Early career ===
Mokhtarian began training in BJJ and later in kickboxing. He won the Australia Eternal Bantamweight Title in April 2016.

=== Ultimate Fighting Championship ===
Mokhtarian signed with UFC in March 2017.

He made his promotional debut against John Moraga on 11 June 2017 at UFC Fight Night 110. He lost the one-sided fight via unanimous decision.

Mokhtarian faced Ryan Benoit on 19 November 2017 at UFC Fight Night: Werdum vs. Tybura. At the weight-ins, Benoit weighed in at 129 pounds, 3 pounds over the flyweight upper limit of 125 pounds. The bout proceeded at a catchweight and Benoit forfeited 20% of his purse to Mokhtarian. Benoit won the fight via knockout due to a head kick in the third round.

Mokhtarian was scheduled to face Jenel Lausa on 13 June 2018 at UFC Fight Night 132; however, he pulled out of the fight in early May citing injury.

Mokhtarian was expected to face Kai Kara-France on 2 December 2018 at UFC Fight Night 142. However, Mokhtarian pulled out of the fight on 20 November citing injury.

On 28 May 2019 it was reported that Mokhtarian was released by the UFC.

=== Post UFC career ===
In his first fight since leaving the UFC, Mokhtarian fought Pancrase veteran Shunichi Shimizu at Hex Fight Series 19 on 6 September 2019. He lost the bout via unanimous decision.

== Mixed martial arts record ==
Professional record breakdown
17 matches	13 wins	4 losses
By knockout	6	1
By submission	6	1
By decision	1	2

Res.	Record	Opponent	Method	Event	Date	Round	Time	Location	Notes
Loss	13–4	Shunichi Shimizu	Decision (unanimous)	Hex Fight Series 19	6 September 2019	3	5:00	Melbourne, Australia	
Loss	13–3	Ryan Benoit	KO (head kick)	UFC Fight Night: Werdum vs. Tybura	19 November 2017	3	2:38	Sydney, Australia	Catchweight (129 lbs) bout; Benoit missed weight.
Loss	13–2	John Moraga	Decision (unanimous)	UFC Fight Night: Lewis vs. Hunt	11 June 2017	3	5:00	Auckland, New Zealand	
Win	13–1	Kan Hamongkol	KO (head kick)	JNI Promotions: 1 on 1	24 February 2017	1	0:27	Sydney, Australia	Flyweight debut.
Win	12–1	Shannon McClellan	Decision (unanimous)	Eternal MMA 16	2 April 2016	3	5:00	Gold Coast, Australia	Won the Eternal MMA Bantamweight Championship.
Win	11–1	Muhammad Hanif bin Zainal	TKO (punches)	Hex Fight Series 5	20 February 2016	2	2:36	Melbourne, Australia	
Win	10–1	Josh Karst	KO (punches)	Wollongong Wars 3	9 July 2015	1	3:18	Wollongong, Australia	Won the Wollongong Wars Bantamweight Championship.
Win	9–1	Honggang Yao	Submission (heel hook)	Rebel FC 3: The Promised Ones	27 June 2015	2	3:00	Shandong, China	
Win	8–1	Jaikom Paitoon	Submission (rear-naked choke)	JNI Promotions: Mokhtarian vs. Paitoon	20 February 2015	1	3:16	Sydney, Australia	Featherweight bout.
Loss	7–1	Edwin Arana	Submission (rear-naked choke)	Nitro MMA 12	11 October 2014	2	3:33	Logan City, Australia	
Win	7–0	Sebastian Taylor	TKO (punches)	Gladiators Cage Fighting 4	5 April 2014	2	0:56	Sydney, Australia	
Win	6–0	Nick Browning	TKO (punches)	JNI Promotions: Proceed With Caution	21 February 2014	1	4:56	Sydney, Australia	Catchweight (150 lbs) bout.
Win	5–0	Ali Mohammad Reza	TKO (punches)	JNI Promotions: Straight Up	29 November 2013	2	2:36	Sydney, Australia	Return to Bantamweight.
Win	4–0	Hakar Magid	Submission (rear-naked choke)	JNI Promotions: Lockdown	30 August 2013	1	4:38	Sydney, Australia	
Win	3–0	Shawn Sutton	Submission (guillotine choke)	War in the West 2	16 March 2013	2	3:24	Sydney, Australia	Featherweight debut. Won the War in the West Featherweight Championship.
Win	2–0	Manopnoi Singmanasak	Submission (guillotine Cchoke)	JNI Promotions: Persons of Interest	23 February 2013	1	0:29	Sydney, Australia	Bantamweight debut.
Win	1–0	Craig Lankester	Submission (rear-naked choke)	6RAR: Fight for the Troops	1 December 2011	1	3:42	Brisbane, Australia	Catchweight (141 lbs) bout.

== See also ==
- List of current UFC fighters
- List of male mixed martial artists
