= UFC Fight Night: Bader vs. Saint Preux =

UFC mixed martial arts event in 2014

- The poster for UFC Fight Night: Bader vs. Saint Preux
- Promotion: Ultimate Fighting Championship
- Date: August 16, 2014
- Venue: Cross Insurance Center
- City: Bangor, Maine
- Attendance: 5,329
- Total gate: $321,470

Event chronology
UFC 176: Aldo vs. Mendes II	UFC Fight Night: Bader vs. Saint Preux	UFC Fight Night: Bisping vs. Le

UFC Fight Night: Bader vs. Saint Preux (also known as UFC Fight Night 47) was a mixed martial arts event held on August 16, 2014, at the Cross Insurance Center in Bangor, Maine.

== Background ==
The event was headlined by top ten light heavyweights Ryan Bader and Ovince Saint Preux.

The event was the first hosted in Maine.

As a result of the cancellation of UFC 176, bouts between Bobby Green vs. Abel Trujillo, Jussier Formiga vs. Zach Makovsky and Gray Maynard vs. Fabrício Camões were rescheduled for this event. Subsequently, Green was removed from his fight on July 11 in favor of a bout as an injury replacement for Michael Johnson against Josh Thomson at UFC on Fox 12 on July 26, 2014. Trujillo was expected to face Ross Pearson.

On August 4, Trujillo pulled out of the Pearson bout and was replaced by Gray Maynard. In turn, Maynard's originally scheduled opponent Fabrício Camões was removed from the card entirely and was rebooked for a separate event with a new opponent.

== Results ==
Main Card (Fox Sports 1)
Weight class				Method	Round	Time	Notes
Light Heavyweight	Ryan Bader	def.	Ovince Saint Preux	Decision (unanimous) (48–47, 49–46, 49–46)	5	5:00
Lightweight	Ross Pearson	def.	Gray Maynard	TKO (punches)	2	1:35
Middleweight	Tim Boetsch	def.	Brad Tavares	TKO (punches)	2	3:18
Welterweight	Alan Jouban	def.	Seth Baczynski	KO (punch)	1	4:23
Heavyweight	Shawn Jordan	def.	Jack May	TKO (punches)	3	2:03
Featherweight	Thiago Tavares	def.	Robbie Peralta	Submission (rear-naked choke)	1	4:27
Preliminary card (Fox Sports 2)
Flyweight	Jussier Formiga	def.	Zach Makovsky	Decision (unanimous) (29–28, 29–28, 29–28)	3	5:00
Women's Bantamweight	Sara McMann	def.	Lauren Murphy	Decision (split) (28–29, 29–28, 29–28)	3	5:00
Middleweight	Tom Watson	def.	Sam Alvey	Decision (unanimous) (29–28, 29–28, 29–28)	3	5:00
Bantamweight	Frankie Saenz	def.	Nolan Ticman	Decision (unanimous) (30–27, 30–27, 30–27)	3	5:00

== Bonus awards ==
The following fighters received $50,000 bonuses:

- Fight of the Night: Alan Jouban vs. Seth Baczynski
- Performance of the Night: Thiago Tavares and Tim Boetsch

== See also ==
- List of UFC events
- 2014 in UFC
