= Fabrício Camões =

Brazilian mixed martial arts fighter

- Born: Fabrício dos Santos Camões; December 23, 1978 (age 47); Rio de Janeiro, Brazil
- Other names: Morango (Strawberry)
- Height: 5 ft 9 in (1.75 m)
- Weight: 155 lb (70 kg; 11.1 st)
- Division: Lightweight
- Reach: 72 1/2 in (184 cm)
- Team: Black House; Team Nogueira; Gracie Humaita
- Rank: 3rd degree black belt in Brazilian Jiu-Jitsu under Royler Gracie
- Years active: 1997–2014

Mixed martial arts record
- Total: 24
- Wins: 14
- By knockout: 4
- By submission: 7
- By decision: 3
- Losses: 9
- By knockout: 2
- By submission: 5
- By decision: 2
- Draws: 1

Other information
- Spouse: Leticia Ribeiro (m. 2012)
- Mixed martial arts record from Sherdog

Fabrício dos Santos Camões (Portuguese pronunciation: [faˈbɾisju kaˈmõjs]; born December 23, 1978) is a Brazilian mixed martial artist, who formerly competed in the Lightweight division of the Ultimate Fighting Championship. Camões's primary style in the cage is Brazilian Jiu Jitsu, Camões is a 3rd degree black belt in Brazilian Jiu Jitsu under Royler Gracie.

== Early life ==
Camões was born December 23, 1978, in Rio de Janeiro, Brazil. According to Jorge Britto, when Camões was 18 years old, he lasted 27 minutes in a bout with former UFC middleweight champion Anderson Silva, who was 22.

His Portuguese nickname Morango, which translates into Strawberry, originated from Camões's love for a local Strawberry flavored yogurt drink while Camões was a young child living in Brazil.

When he was 16, Camões constantly witnessed the late Hélio Gracie still practicing Brazilian Jiu Jitsu in his 90s.

Fabrício Camões and Hélio Gracie

== Mixed martial arts career ==
=== Ultimate Fighting Championship ===
Camões signed a four-fight contract with the Ultimate Fighting Championship and made his UFC debut at UFC 106 against veteran Caol Uno, with the fight ending in a draw after a point was deducted in the 2nd round against Camões for an illegal upkick.

In his next UFC bout on March 27, 2010, at UFC 111 Camões fought Kurt Pellegrino. A fight that saw both Camões and Pellegrino grappling back and forth, ultimately a visibly exhausted Camões succumbed to a rear naked choke late in the second round. Following the loss to Pellegrino, Camões was released from the UFC with a record of 0–1–1.

=== Post-UFC career ===
Following his release from the UFC, Camões signed with Tachi Palace Fights. He fought fellow UFC veteran Steve Lopez on February 18, 2011, and won via devastating head kick KO in the first round.

Camões next fought on May 5, 2011, at Tachi Palace Fights 9 against fellow UFC veteran Efraín Escudero. He won the fight via unanimous decision.

=== Return to UFC ===
After winning his last two fights since being released from the UFC, Camões was expected to face Reza Madadi on January 20, 2012, at UFC on FX 1, replacing an injured Rafaello Oliveira. However, Madadi himself would later withdraw from the bout due to injury as well and was replaced by promotional newcomer Tommy Hayden. Camões won the fight via submission in the first round.

Camões next lost to Melvin Guillard by unanimous decision on July 7, 2012, at UFC 148.

Camões faced Jim Miller on December 28, 2013, at UFC 168. He lost the fight via submission in the first round.

Camões was expected to face Gray Maynard on August 2, 2014, at UFC 176. However, after the event was cancelled, the bout was rescheduled for UFC Fight Night 47 on August 16, 2014. In turn, Maynard filled in as an injury replacement for another bout on the card and Camões was pulled from the event entirely.

Camões was expected to face Josh Shockley on October 25, 2014, at UFC 179. However, Shockley pulled out of the bout citing injury and was replaced by Anthony Rocco Martin. Both Camões and Martin missed weight for the bout, but neither were issued a fine. Camões lost the fight via submission in the first round, and was subsequently released from the promotion for the second time in his career.

== Mixed martial arts record ==
Professional record breakdown
24 matches	14 wins	9 losses
By knockout	4	2
By submission	7	5
By decision	3	2
Draws	1	

Res.	Record	Opponent	Method	Event	Date	Round	Time	Location	Notes
Loss	14–9–1	Anthony Rocco Martin	Submission (kimura)	UFC 179	October 25, 2014	1	4:16	Rio de Janeiro, Brazil	Catchweight (158 lbs) bout; Both fighters missed weight.
Loss	14–8–1	Jim Miller	Submission (armbar)	UFC 168	December 28, 2013	1	3:42	Las Vegas, Nevada, United States	
Loss	14–7–1	Melvin Guillard	Decision (unanimous)	UFC 148	July 7, 2012	3	5:00	Las Vegas, Nevada, United States	
Win	14–6–1	Tommy Hayden	Submission (rear-naked choke)	UFC on FX: Guillard vs. Miller	January 20, 2012	1	4:03	Nashville, Tennessee, United States	
Win	13–6–1	Efraín Escudero	Decision (unanimous)	TPF 9: The Contenders	May 5, 2011	3	5:00	Lemoore, California, United States	
Win	12–6–1	Steve Lopez	KO (head kick and punches)	TPF 8: All or Nothing	February 18, 2011	1	0:23	Lemoore, California, United States	
Loss	11–6–1	Kurt Pellegrino	Submission (rear-naked choke)	UFC 111	March 27, 2010	2	4:20	Newark, New Jersey, United States	
Draw	11–5–1	Caol Uno	Draw (majority)	UFC 106	November 21, 2009	3	5:00	Las Vegas, Nevada, United States	Camões had one point deducted for an illegal up-kick to the head.
Win	11–5	Torrance Taylor	Submission (rear-naked choke)	Strikeforce Challengers: Evangelista vs. Aina	May 15, 2009	1	3:21	Fresno, California, United States	
Win	10–5	Sam Morgan	Submission (rear-naked choke)	ShoXC: Hamman vs. Suganuma 2	August 15, 2008	1	0:47	Friant, California, United States	
Win	9–5	Joe Camacho	KO (punches)	ShoXC: Elite Challenger Series	April 5, 2008	1	3:20	Friant, California, United States	
Win	8–5	Jean Silva	Submission (armbar)	Super Challenge 1	October 10, 2006	1	2:10	Barueri, Brazil	
Win	7–5	Luciano Azevedo	Decision (unanimous)	Super Challenge 1	October 10, 2006	2	5:00	Barueri, Brazil	
Win	6–5	Mauro Chimento Jr.	Submission (guillotine choke)	Super Challenge 1	October 10, 2006	1	2:00	Barueri, Brazil	
Win	5–5	Epitacio Silva	Submission (gogoplata)	Iron Fight 2	September 2, 2006	1	2:02	Rio de Janeiro, Brazil	
Loss	4–5	Luiz Dutra Jr.	Decision (unanimous)	Gold Fighters Championship 1	May 20, 2006	3	5:00	Rio de Janeiro, Brazil	
Loss	4–4	Gleison Tibau	Submission (rear-naked choke)	Meca World Vale Tudo 12	July 9, 2005	1	2:15	Rio de Janeiro, Brazil	
Win	4–3	Vitelmo Kubis Bandeira	Decision (unanimous)	Storm Samurai 6	March 19, 2005	3	5:00	Curitiba, Brazil	
Loss	3–3	Luiz Dutra Jr.	Submission (knee injury)	Meca World Vale Tudo 10	December 20, 2003	1	1:50	Porto Alegre, Brazil	
Win	3–2	Marcello Rodriguez	Submission (smother choke)	Sul Combat 1	November 29, 2003	1	N/A	Porto Alegre, Brazil	
Win	2–2	Wagner Tulio	TKO (punches)	Meca World Vale Tudo 8	May 16, 2003	1	1:40	Curitiba, Brazil	
Loss	1–2	Luiz Azeredo	TKO (punches)	Meca World Vale Tudo 3	November 14, 2000	2	1:36	Curitiba, Brazil	
Loss	1–1	Anderson Silva	TKO (retirement)	Brazilian Freestyle Circuit 1	June 25, 1997	1	25:14	Campo Grande, Brazil	
Win	1–0	Eliezer Ninja	TKO (punches)	Brazilian Freestyle Circuit 1	June 25, 1997	1	4:55	Campo Grande, Brazil	
