= Zach Makovsky =

American mixed martial artist

- Born: April 19, 1982 (age 44); Bethlehem, Pennsylvania, U.S.
- Other names: Fun Size
- Height: 5 ft 4 in (1.63 m)
- Weight: 125 lb (57 kg; 8.9 st)
- Division: Flyweight; Bantamweight
- Reach: 64 in (163 cm)
- Fighting out of: Philadelphia, Pennsylvania, U.S.
- Team: Tristar Gym
- Rank: Black belt in Brazilian Jiu-Jitsu under Marcelo Garcia
- Wrestling: NCAA Division I Wrestling
- Years active: 2006–2023

Mixed martial arts record
- Total: 33
- Wins: 21
- By knockout: 1
- By submission: 7
- By decision: 13
- Losses: 12
- By knockout: 1
- By submission: 3
- By decision: 8

Other information
- University: Drexel University
- Mixed martial arts record from Sherdog

Zach Makovsky (born April 19, 1982) is an American former mixed martial artist who competed in the flyweight division. He has competed in EliteXC, ShoXC, Bellator, Brave Combat Federation, and Ultimate Fighting Championship. He is the former Bellator Bantamweight World Champion.

== Early life and education ==
Makovsky was born in Bethlehem, Pennsylvania, on April 19, 1982. He began wrestling when he was six years old. He excelled in youth and middle school programs before attending Bethlehem Catholic High School, where he was a four-year varsity letterman and the team's captain during his senior season.

Makovsky then attended Drexel University in Philadelphia, where he was a walk on for the Drexel wrestling team. After redshirting his first season, he went on to be a four-year varsity letterman and captain of the team for his senior season. During the off-season, Makovsky trained in mixed martial arts, met Eddie Alvarez, and competed in many grappling tournaments. Makovsky's overall grappling record is 65–7.

== Mixed martial arts career ==
Makovsky began his mixed martial arts career in small shows based in New Jersey. He compiled a 3–0 record with two via unanimous decision and one via split decision.

=== EliteXC ===
Makovsky then joined EliteXC and made his promotional debut at ShoXC: Elite Challenger Series in January 2008. His opponent was two-time Bellator Featherweight Tournament participant Wilson Reis. Early in the second round, Reis defeated Makovsky via submission using an arm-triangle choke.

Makovsky returned in May 2008, at EliteXC: Primetime to face André Soares. After three rounds, Makovsky was declared the winner via unanimous decision.

EliteXC then dissolved and Makovsky fought two bouts in New Jersey, winning both via rear-naked choke submission.

Makovsky then fought his first fight abroad, in Tokyo, Japan, against Toshiaki Kitada. Makovsky was submitted with a rear-naked choke submission late in the first round.

In his final pre-Bellator fight, Makovsky was part of the M-1 Selection in the Americas. He defeated Josh Rave via technical submission (guillotine choke) after controlling the bout with effective takedowns and wrestling.

=== Bellator Fighting Championships ===
Makovsky debuted for the Bellator promotion at Bellator 21 against Eric Luke. Late in the second round, Makovsky forced Luke to tap out to a kimura. As a result of that victory, Makovsky was signed to take part in the Bellator Season Three Bantamweight Tournament.

At Bellator 27, Makovsky defeated Nick Mamalis via unanimous decision. The win moved Makovsky into the semi-final round, in which he faced Bryan Goldsby. Makovsky used his wrestling and jiu-jitsu to frustrate Goldsby and claimed a unanimous decision victory.

In the tournament final, Makovsky faced Ed West. Makovsky also fell to a kimura early in the matchup and a knee that knocked him down in the opening seconds. However, Makovsky came back and controlled the fight to take a unanimous decision and become the inaugural Bellator Bantamweight Champion.

Makovsky next faced undefeated Chad Robichaux at Bellator 41 in a non-title fight. He won the fight via TKO in the third round.

Makovsky fought in his second non-title fight at Bellator 54. He faced one-time UFC competitor Ryan Roberts and won via submission in the first round.

Makovsky attempted to make his first title defense against Season 5 bantamweight tournament winner Eduardo Dantas at Bellator 65 in Atlantic City on April 13, 2012. He lost via second round technical submission due to an arm triangle choke.

Makovsky attempted to get back into the win column when he took on Anthony Leone, but lost the fight by controversial split decision. After two consecutive losses, Makovsky was released from the promotion.

=== Cage Fury ===
On May 11, 2013, Makovsky made his flyweight debut for Cage Fury Fighting Championships. Makovsky defeated fellow Bellator veteran Claudio Ledesma via unanimous decision.

=== Resurrection Fighting Alliance ===
On November 22, 2013, Makovsky made his debut for RFA against Matt Manzanares for the vacant Flyweight Championship. He won the fight via unanimous decision.

=== Ultimate Fighting Championship ===
On December 4, 2013, it was announced that Makovsky had signed with the Ultimate Fighting Championship, stepping in to replace an injured John Dodson against Scott Jorgensen at UFC on Fox 9. He won the fight via unanimous decision.

For his second UFC fight, Makovsky made a quick return to the Octagon as he faced Josh Sampo at UFC 170 on February 22, 2014. He won the fight via unanimous decision.

Makovsky was expected to face Jussier Formiga on August 2, 2014, at UFC 176. However, after UFC 176 was cancelled, Formiga/Makovsky was rescheduled and eventually took place on August 16, 2014, at UFC Fight Night 47. Makovsky lost the fight via unanimous decision.

Makovsky faced Tim Elliott on February 15, 2014, at UFC Fight Night 60. Makovsky won the back-and-forth fight by unanimous decision.

Makovsky faced John Dodson on May 23, 2015, at UFC 187. Makovsky lost the fight via unanimous decision.

Makovsky faced Joseph Benavidez on February 6, 2016, at UFC Fight Night 82. He lost the fight via unanimous decision.

Makovsky was expected to face John Moraga on December 10, 2016, at UFC 206. However, Moraga pulled out of the fight in early November citing injury and was replaced by Dustin Ortiz. He lost the fight via split decision.

=== Absolute Championship Berkut ===
Makovsky faced Josiel Silva at ACB 60 on 13 May 2017. He won via submission in the third round.

Makovsky faced Yoni Sherbatov at ACB 72 on October 14, 2017. He lost the fight via unanimous decision.

=== Brave Combat Federation ===
Makovsky debuted for the promotion at Brave CF 34. His opponent was 2016 sambo world champion, Russian fighter Velimurad Alkhasov. Makovsky won the contest via split decision.

Makovsky was expected to face Abdul Hussein in the opening round of the Brave Flyweight Championship tournament. However, Hussein was forced to withdraw from the bout due to sickness during the weight cut. Makovsky advanced to the semifinals of the tournament.

Makovsky rematched Velimurad Alkhasov in the semi-final of the Brave Flyweight Championship tournament on April 1, 2021, at Brave CF 50. In a very close bout, Makovsky lost via split decision.

Makovsky would then go on to face future UFC fighter Asu Almabayev on July 30, 2022, at Brave CF 60, losing for the third time in a row via split decision.

Makovsky faced Falvio de Queiroz on August 12, 2023, at Brave CF 73, losing the bout via TKO stoppage in the first round.

== Championships ==
- Bellator Fighting Championships
  - Bellator Bantamweight World Championship (One time, First)
  - Bellator Season 3 Bantamweight Tournament Winner
- Resurrection Fighting Alliance
  - RFA Flyweight Championship (One time, Current)
- Combat in the Cage
  - CITC Bantamweight Championship (One time)

== Mixed martial arts record ==
Professional record breakdown
33 matches	21 wins	12 losses
By knockout	1	1
By submission	7	3
By decision	13	8

Res.	Record	Opponent	Method	Event	Date	Round	Time	Location	Notes
Loss	21–12	Flavio de Queiroz	TKO (punches)	Brave CF 73	August 12, 2023	1	2:03	Bogotá, Colombia	
Loss	21–11	Asu Almabayev	Decision (split)	Brave CF 60	July 30, 2022	3	5:00	Isa Town, Bahrain	
Loss	21–10	Velimurad Alkhasov	Decision (split)	Brave CF 50	April 1, 2021	3	5:00	Arad, Bahrain	Flyweight Tournament Semi-Final Bout.
Win	21–9	Velimurad Alkhasov	Decision (split)	Brave CF 34	January 19, 2020	3	5:00	Ljubljana, Slovenia	
Loss	20–9	Yoni Sherbatov	Decision (unanimous)	ACB 72	October 14, 2017	3	5:00	Montreal, Quebec, Canada	
Win	20–8	Josiel Silva	Submission (guillotine choke)	ACB 60	May 13, 2017	3	1:08	Vienna, Austria	
Loss	19–8	Dustin Ortiz	Decision (split)	UFC 206	December 10, 2016	3	5:00	Toronto, Ontario, Canada	
Loss	19–7	Joseph Benavidez	Decision (unanimous)	UFC Fight Night: Hendricks vs. Thompson	February 6, 2016	3	5:00	Las Vegas, Nevada, United States	
Loss	19–6	John Dodson	Decision (unanimous)	UFC 187	May 23, 2015	3	5:00	Las Vegas, Nevada United States	
Win	19–5	Tim Elliott	Decision (unanimous)	UFC Fight Night: Henderson vs. Thatch	February 14, 2015	3	5:00	Broomfield, Colorado, United States	
Loss	18–5	Jussier Formiga	Decision (unanimous)	UFC Fight Night: Bader vs. St. Preux	August 16, 2014	3	5:00	Bangor, Maine, United States	
Win	18–4	Josh Sampo	Decision (unanimous)	UFC 170	February 22, 2014	3	5:00	Las Vegas, Nevada, United States	
Win	17–4	Scott Jorgensen	Decision (unanimous)	UFC on Fox: Johnson vs. Benavidez 2	December 14, 2013	3	5:00	Sacramento, California, United States	
Win	16–4	Matt Manzanares	Decision (unanimous)	RFA 11	November 22, 2013	5	5:00	Broomfield, Colorado, United States	Won the vacant RFA Flyweight Championship.
Win	15–4	Claudio Ledesma	Decision (unanimous)	CFFC 24	May 11, 2013	3	5:00	Atlantic City, New Jersey, United States	Flyweight debut.
Loss	14–4	Anthony Leone	Decision (split)	Bellator 83	December 7, 2012	3	5:00	Atlantic City, New Jersey, United States	
Loss	14–3	Eduardo Dantas	Submission (arm-triangle choke)	Bellator 65	April 13, 2012	2	3:26	Atlantic City, New Jersey, United States	Lost the Bellator Bantamweight World Championship.
Win	14–2	Ryan Roberts	Submission (north-south choke)	Bellator 54	October 15, 2011	1	4:48	Atlantic City, New Jersey, United States	Non-title fight.
Win	13–2	Chad Robichaux	TKO (punches)	Bellator 41	April 16, 2011	3	2:02	Yuma, Arizona, United States	Non-title fight.
Win	12–2	Ed West	Decision (unanimous)	Bellator 32	October 14, 2010	5	5:00	Kansas City, Missouri, United States	Bellator Season Three Bantamweight Final. Won the Bellator Bantamweight World Championship.
Win	11–2	Bryan Goldsby	Decision (unanimous)	Bellator 30	September 23, 2010	3	5:00	Louisville, Kentucky, United States	Bellator Season Three Bantamweight Tournament Semifinal.
Win	10–2	Nick Mamalis	Decision (unanimous)	Bellator 27	September 2, 2010	3	5:00	San Antonio, Texas, United States	Bellator Season Three Bantamweight Tournament Quarterfinal.
Win	9–2	Eric Luke	Submission (kimura)	Bellator 21	June 10, 2010	2	4:28	Hollywood, Florida, United States	
Win	8–2	Josh Rave	Submission (guillotine choke)	M-1 Selection 2010: The Americas Round 1	April 3, 2010	3	1:49	Atlantic City, New Jersey, United States	
Win	7–2	David Harris	Submission (triangle choke)	Adrenaline: New Breed	February 26, 2010	1	1:50	Atlantic City, New Jersey, United States	
Loss	6–2	Toshiaki Kitada	Submission (rear-naked choke)	Deep: 43 Impact	August 23, 2009	1	4:22	Tokyo, Japan	
Win	6–1	Nate Williams	Submission (rear-naked choke)	WCA: Caged Combat	June 6, 2009	3	2:33	Atlantic City, New Jersey, United States	
Win	5–1	Justin Robbins	Submission (rear-naked choke)	Extreme Challenge: The War at the Shore	January 26, 2009	2	1:05	Atlantic City, New Jersey, United States	
Win	4–1	André Soares	Decision (unanimous)	EliteXC: Primetime	May 31, 2008	3	5:00	Newark, New Jersey, United States	
Loss	3–1	Wilson Reis	Submission (arm-triangle choke)	ShoXC: Elite Challenger Series	January 25, 2008	2	1:15	Atlantic City, New Jersey, United States	
Win	3–0	Emerson Souza	Decision (unanimous)	CITC: Fearless Fighters Return	October 6, 2007	3	5:00	Trenton, New Jersey, United States	Won the CITC Bantamweight Championship.
Win	2–0	Leandro Escobar	Decision (split)	Extreme Challenge 75	March 23, 2007	3	5:00	Trenton, New Jersey, United States	
Win	1–0	Tinh Tupy	Decision (unanimous)	CITC: Evolutions	December 9, 2006	3	5:00	Asbury Park, New Jersey, United States	

== See also ==
- List of Bellator MMA alumni
- List of male mixed martial artists
- List of multi-sport athletes
- List of multi-sport champions
