= UFC 176 =

UFC mixed martial arts event in 2014

UFC 176: Aldo vs. Mendes II
- The poster for UFC 176: Aldo vs. Mendes II
- Promotion: Ultimate Fighting Championship
- Date: August 2, 2014 (cancelled)
- Venue: Staples Center
- City: Los Angeles, California

Event chronology
UFC on Fox: Lawler vs. Brown	UFC 176: Aldo vs. Mendes II	UFC Fight Night: Bader vs. Saint Preux

UFC 176: Aldo vs. Mendes II was a planned mixed martial arts event that was scheduled to be held by the Ultimate Fighting Championship on August 2, 2014, at Staples Center in Los Angeles, California.

== Background ==
The event was expected to be headlined by a UFC Featherweight Championship rematch between at the time champion José Aldo and challenger Chad Mendes. Their first fight at UFC 142 ended in a first round KO victory in favor of Aldo. However, on July 2, Aldo pulled out of the fight due to an injury suffered in training.

Subsequent to Aldo's injury, the event was cancelled on July 8, when the UFC announced they were unable to replace the original main event fight and with less than a month before the event, the decision was made to postpone the event – though the promotion said the numbering scheme for already scheduled pay-per-views after it will remain in consecutive order. The fights booked for this event were shifted to other upcoming cards. Aldo and Mendes eventually fought at UFC 179.

This was the second time, following UFC 151 in August 2012, that the promotion was forced to cancel an event because of a lack of a high profile fight to fill a main event spot.

== Cancelled fight card ==
Fight card
Weight class				Method	Round	Time	Notes
Featherweight	José Aldo (c)	vs.	Chad Mendes				(Note: Moved to UFC 179)
Middleweight	Ronaldo Souza	vs.	Gegard Mousasi				(Note: Moved to UFC Fight Night: Jacaré vs. Mousasi)
Lightweight	Gray Maynard	vs.	Fabrício Camões				(Note: Moved to UFC Fight Night: Bader vs. St. Preux. Ross Pearson replaced Drew Lorenc.)
Women's Bantamweight	Bethe Correia	vs.	Shayna Baszler				(Note: Moved to UFC 177)
Flyweight	Jussier Formiga	vs.	Zach Makovsky				(Note: Moved to UFC Fight Night: Bader vs. St. Preux)
Lightweight	James Vick	vs.	Valmir Lazaro				(Note: Moved to UFC Fight Night: Henderson vs. dos Anjos)
Middleweight	Lorenz Larkin	vs.	Derek Brunson				(Note: Moved to UFC 177)
Lightweight	Bobby Green	vs.	Abel Trujillo				(Note: Moved to UFC Fight Night: Bader vs. St. Preux. Matchup eventually scrapped.)
Lightweight	Tony Ferguson	vs.	Danny Castillo				(Note: Moved to UFC 177)
Lightweight	Beneil Dariush	vs.	Anthony Rocco Martin				(Note: Moved to UFC Fight Night: Henderson vs. dos Anjos)
Welterweight	Alex Garcia	vs.	Matt Dwyer

== Popular culture ==
The event was fictionalized in the 2012 film Here Comes the Boom. In the film it took place the MGM Grand in Las Vegas. The main event in the film was Junior Dos Santos against Shane Carwin. The film's main character Scott Voss, played by Kevin James, fights fictional fighter Ken "The Executioner" Dietric, played by former UFC fighter Krzysztof Soszynski. UFC Hall of Famer Bas Rutten plays Voss's trainer Niko. The film also includes cameos from Joe Rogan, Mike Goldberg, Chael Sonnen, Brian Stann, Herb Dean, Wanderlei Silva, Jacob "Stitch" Duran, and Bruce Buffer all playing themselves.

== See also ==
- List of UFC events
- 2014 in UFC
