= Henrique da Silva (fighter) =

Brazilian mixed martial arts fighter

- Born: Luis Henrique da Silva; September 1, 1989 (age 37); Limoeiro, Pernambuco, Brazil
- Other names: Frankenstein
- Height: 6 ft 3 in (1.91 m)
- Weight: 205 lb (93 kg; 14.6 st)
- Division: Heavyweight; Light heavyweight
- Reach: 76 in (190 cm)
- Stance: Orthodox
- Fighting out of: Benevides, Pará, Brazil
- Team: Elite Combat
- Rank: Black belt in Muay Thai; Purple belt in Brazilian Jiu-Jitsu
- Years active: 2013–present

Mixed martial arts record
- Total: 32
- Wins: 19
- By knockout: 17
- By submission: 1
- By decision: 1
- Losses: 13
- By knockout: 7
- By submission: 3
- By decision: 3

Other information
- Mixed martial arts record from Sherdog

Luis Henrique da Silva (born September 1, 1989) is a Brazilian mixed martial artist currently competing in the light heavyweight division. A professional since 2013, he has fought in the Ultimate Fighting Championship.

== Background ==
Da Silva began training in various forms of martial arts as a youngster. He then starting training in Muay Thai, and jiu-jitsu as a teenager before transitioning to mixed martial arts in 2011.

== Mixed martial arts career ==
Da Silva made his professional mixed martial arts debut in December 2013. He compiled an undefeated record of 10–0, competing primarily for various regional promotions in North Brazil before signing with the UFC in 2016.

=== Ultimate Fighting Championship ===
Da Silva made his promotional debut against Jonathan Wilson on June 4, 2016, at UFC 199. He won the fight TKO in the second round.

Da Silva next faced Joachim Christensen on October 1, 2016, at UFC Fight Night 96. He won the fight by submission in the second round.

Da Silva faced Paul Craig on December 17, 2016, at UFC on Fox 22. He lost the fight via submission in the second round.

Da Silva faced promotional newcomer Jordan Johnson on January 28, 2017, at UFC on Fox 23. He lost the fight via unanimous decision.

Da Silva faced Ion Cuțelaba on June 11, 2017, at UFC Fight Night 110. He lost the fight via knockout in the first round.

Da Silva faced promotional newcomer Gökhan Saki on September 23, 2017, at UFC Fight Night 117. He lost the fight via knockout in the first round.

Da Silva was released from the UFC on November 15, 2017.

=== Post UFC ===
After going 6-4 outside of major promotions, including an appearance on Dana White's Contender Series Brazil 2, where he lost to Johnny Walker via unanimous decision, Da Silva signed with Konfrontacja Sztuk Walki (KSW) coming off two stoppages on the Brazilian scene. In his first appearance, he faced former champion Tomasz Narkun on October 14, 2022, at KSW 75: Ruchała vs. Stasiak. After getting dominated on the ground in the first round, Da Silva knocked out Narkun with a front kick 28 seconds into the second round.

In his sophomore performance with the promotion, da Silva faced Oumar Sy on March 17, 2023, at KSW 80: Ruchała vs. Eskiev, getting submitted via rear-naked choke in the first round.

Da Silva faced Marcin Wójcik on November 11, 2023 at KSW 88: Rutkowski vs. Kaczmarczyk, getting knocked out in the second round by an uppercut.

== Championships and accomplishments ==
- Pitbull Fight Championship
  - PFC Light Heavyweight Championship (one time)
- Ultimate Fighting Championship
  - Performance of the Night (one time) vs. Joachim Christensen

== Mixed martial arts record ==
Professional record breakdown
33 matches	20 wins	13 losses
By knockout	18	7
By submission	1	3
By decision	1	3

Res.	Record	Opponent	Method	Event	Date	Round	Time	Location	Notes
Loss	20–13	Arturs Skabarnieks	KO (punch)	Bazara 0 Fight Club 4	September 12, 2026	1	2:48	Riga, Latvia	
Loss	20–12	Muhammad Saidov	KO (punches)	UAE Warriors 71	May 9, 2026	1	1:03	Abu Dhabi, United Arab Emirates	Light Heavyweight bout.
Loss	20–11	Hasan Mezhiev	Submission (rear-naked choke)	Bazara 0 Fight Club 3	January 10, 2026	2	2:40	Riga, Latvia	
Win	20–10	Weldon Silva de Oliveira	TKO (punches)	The King Fight Combat 1	June 22, 2025	1	2:22	Belém, Brazil	Return to Heavyweight.
Loss	19–10	Marcin Wójcik	KO (punch)	KSW 88	November 11, 2023	2	0:33	Radom, Poland	
Loss	19–9	Oumar Sy	Submission (rear-naked choke)	KSW 80	March 17, 2023	1	1:40	Lubin, Poland	
Win	19–8	Tomasz Narkun	KO (front kick)	KSW 75	October 14, 2022	2	0:28	Nowy Sącz, Poland	Knockout of the Night.
Win	18–8	Natalicio Filho	KO (punches)	Pitbull Fight 59	August 6, 2022	2	4:07	Castanhal, Brazil	Won the vacant PFC Light Heavyweight Championship.
Win	17–8	Leonardo Vasconcelos	TKO (punches)	EF Fight Champions	May 21, 2022	1	4:17	Benevides, Brazil	
Loss	16–8	Ivan Erslan	TKO (punches)	Armagedon 2 Finals	December 4, 2021	1	3:20	Osijek, Croatia	
Win	16–7	Maico Machado	TKO (punches)	Redenção Fight MMA 1	August 28, 2021	2	4:20	Redenção, Brazil	
Loss	15–7	Karlos Vémola	Decision (unanimous)	Oktagon 13	July 27, 2019	3	5:00	Prague, Czech Republic	
Win	15–6	Jan Gottvald	KO (punch)	Oktagon 12	June 8, 2019	1	4:52	Bratislava, Slovakia	
Loss	14–6	Kleber Silva	KO (punch)	Super Fight Brazil 1	November 10, 2018	1	2:41	Teresina, Brazil	
Loss	14–5	Johnny Walker	Decision (unanimous)	Dana White's Contender Series Brazil 2	August 11, 2018	3	5:00	Las Vegas, Nevada, United States	
Win	14–4	Edvaldo de Oliveira	Decision (unanimous)	Arena Fight: In Memorian Meire Cabral	May 12, 2018	3	5:00	Redenção, Brazil	
Win	13–4	José Otávio dos Santos Lacerda	TKO (retirement)	Mr. Cage 34	March 10, 2018	2	5:00	Manaus, Brazil	Won the vacant Mr. Cage Light Heavyweight Championship.
Loss	12–4	Gökhan Saki	KO (punch)	UFC Fight Night: Saint Preux vs. Okami	September 23, 2017	1	4:45	Saitama, Japan	
Loss	12–3	Ion Cuțelaba	KO (punches)	UFC Fight Night: Lewis vs. Hunt	June 11, 2017	1	0:22	Auckland, New Zealand	
Loss	12–2	Jordan Johnson	Decision (unanimous)	UFC on Fox: Shevchenko vs. Peña	January 28, 2017	3	5:00	Denver, Colorado, United States	
Loss	12–1	Paul Craig	Submission (armbar)	UFC on Fox: VanZant vs. Waterson	December 17, 2016	2	1:59	Sacramento, California, United States	
Win	12–0	Joachim Christensen	Submission (armbar)	UFC Fight Night: Lineker vs. Dodson	October 1, 2016	2	4:43	Portland, Oregon, United States	Performance of the Night.
Win	11–0	Jonathan Wilson	TKO (punches)	UFC 199	June 4, 2016	2	4:11	Inglewood, California, United States	
Win	10–0	Ildemar Alcântara	TKO (punches)	The King of Jungle 2	January 14, 2016	2	4:55	Belém, Brazil	
Win	9–0	Mauricio Santos	KO (head kick)	Brutality MMA 1	December 5, 2015	1	1:29	Benevides, Brazil	
Win	8–0	Rodrigo Icoaraci	TKO (doctor stoppage)	Territory MMA 1	October 9, 2015	2	2:34	Benevides, Brazil	
Win	7–0	Messias Pai de Santo	KO (punches)	Team Nogueira MMA Circuit	March 26, 2015	2	2:15	Ananindeua, Brazil	
Win	9–0	Mayke Douglas Silva Mosque	TKO (punches)	Super Pitbull Fight 40	December 6, 2014	1	0:31	Castanhal, Brazil	
Win	5–0	Rafael Silva	TKO (submission to punches)	Rec Combat 2	November 29, 2014	1	0:32	Belém, Brazil	
Win	4–0	Rogério Silva	TKO (punches)	Coalizão Fight 4	November 13, 2014	1	1:49	Benevides, Brazil	Light Heavyweight debut.
Win	3–0	Fábio Augusto de Assis Vasconcelos	TKO (punches)	Coalizão Fight 3	September 4, 2014	1	3:35	Belém, Brazil	
Win	2–0	Alberto Ramos Pinheiro	KO (punches)	Benevides FC 8	May 23, 2014	1	2:40	Benevides, Brazil	
Win	1–0	Jonathan Vale	TKO (punches)	Gringo Super Fight 8	December 15, 2013	1	4:28	Rio de Janeiro, Brazil	Heavyweight debut.

== See also ==
- List of current KSW fighters
- List of male mixed martial artists
