= Chris Dempsey =

American mixed martial arts (MMA) fighter

- Born: September 8, 1987 (age 39); Sewickley, Pennsylvania, United States
- Height: 5 ft 10 in (178 cm)
- Weight: 185 lb (84 kg; 13.2 st)
- Division: Light Heavyweight; Middleweight
- Reach: 71 in (180 cm)
- Fighting out of: Lower Burrell, Pennsylvania, United States
- Team: The Mat Factory
- Years active: 2012–2021

Mixed martial arts record
- Total: 18
- Wins: 11
- By knockout: 2
- By submission: 3
- By decision: 6
- Losses: 7
- By knockout: 6
- By submission: 1

Other information
- University: University of Pittsburgh at Johnstown
- Mixed martial arts record from Sherdog

Chris Dempsey is an American professional mixed martial artist who last competed in 2021. A professional since 2012, he has competed for the UFC and Bellator MMA.

== Background ==
Born and raised in Pennsylvania, Dempsey played football, and also competed in wrestling. He was a two time All-American at University of Pittsburgh at Johnstown, where he also earned a degree in political science. He began training in mixed martial arts part-time as a college student in 2008.

== Mixed martial arts career ==
=== Early career ===
Dempsey made his debut as an amateur in 2011, winning three fights before turning professional in 2012.

He fought primarily for regional promotions in Western Pennsylvania where he compiled a record of 10-1 competing in both the light heavyweight and middleweight divisions before signing with the UFC on the summer of 2014.

=== Ultimate Fighting Championship ===
Dempsey made his promotional debut as a short notice replacement against Ilir Latifi on July 19, 2014, at UFC Fight Night 46, filling in for Tom Lawlor. Latifi effectively used leg kicks to disable his opponent, before finishing him with punches, ending the fight by a first round knockout.

Dempsey next faced Eddie Gordon in a middleweight bout on April 18, 2015, at UFC on Fox 15. He won the fight via split decision.

Dempsey returned to the light heavyweight division as a short notice replacement to face promotional newcomer Jonathan Wilson on August 8, 2015, at UFC Fight Night 73, filling in for Jared Cannonier. He lost the fight knockout in the first round.

Dempsey faced Scott Askham on February 27, 2016, at UFC Fight Night 84. He lost the fight by knockout in the first round and was subsequently released from the promotion.

=== Bellator MMA ===
In his Bellator debut, Dempsey faced undefeated prospect Ed Ruth on November 3, 2017, at Bellator 186. He lost the fight via knockout in the second round.

== Mixed martial arts record ==
Professional record breakdown
18 matches	11 wins	7 losses
By knockout	2	6
By submission	3	1
By decision	6	0

Res.	Record	Opponent	Method	Event	Date	Round	Time	Location	Notes
Loss	11–7	Rex Harris	TKO (punches)	247 FC: Flood City Fight Night	August 21, 2021	1	1:58	Johnstown, Pennsylvania, United States	
Loss	11–6	Ed Ruth	KO (punch)	Bellator 186	November 3, 2017	2	0:27	University Park, Pennsylvania, United States	
Loss	11–5	Adam Hunter	KO (punches)	Gladiators of the Cage MMA 21	June 4, 2016	1	0:40	Pittsburgh, Pennsylvania, United States	
Loss	11–4	Scott Askham	KO (punch and head kick)	UFC Fight Night: Silva vs. Bisping	February 27, 2016	1	4:45	London, England	
Loss	11–3	Jonathan Wilson	KO (punches)	UFC Fight Night: Teixeira vs. Saint Preux	August 8, 2015	1	0:50	Nashville, Tennessee, United States	Light Heavyweight bout.
Win	11–2	Eddie Gordon	Decision (split)	UFC on Fox: Machida vs. Rockhold	April 18, 2015	3	5:00	Newark, New Jersey, United States	
Loss	10–2	Ilir Latifi	KO (punches)	UFC Fight Night: McGregor vs. Brandão	July 19, 2014	1	2:07	Dublin, Ireland	Light Heavyweight bout.
Win	10–1	Nick Krauss	TKO (punches)	Gladiators of the Cage: Road to Glory 6	May 3, 2014	3	4:11	Johnstown, Pennsylvania, United States	Defended the GOTC Middleweight Championship.
Win	9–1	Muhammad Abdullah	Submission (guillotine choke)	Gladiators of the Cage: North Shore 4	March 15, 2014	2	0:56	Pittsburgh, Pennsylvania, United States	Defended the GOTC Middleweight Championship.
Win	8–1	Tiawan Howard	Submission (north-south choke)	Gladiators of the Cage: North Shore 3	December 7, 2013	1	4:51	Pittsburgh, Pennsylvania, United States	Catchweight (190 lbs) bout.
Win	7–1	Tenyeh Dixon	TKO (punches)	Gladiators of the Cage: Road to Glory 5	September 7, 2013	2	1:27	Cheswick, Pennsylvania, United States	Won the GOTC Middleweight Championship.
Win	6–1	Lewis Rumsey	Decision (unanimous)	Gladiators of the Cage: North Shore 2	July 20, 2013	3	5:00	Pittsburgh, Pennsylvania, United States	Light Heavyweight bout; won the GOTC Light Heavyweight Championship.
Winn	5–1	Dervyn Lopez	Decision (unanimous)	Gladiators of the Cage: Road to Glory 5	April 6, 2013	3	5:00	Cheswick, Pennsylvania, United States	
Win	4–1	Christopher Wing	Decision (unanimous)	Xtreme Caged Combat: Mayhem	February 16, 2013	3	5:00	Philadelphia, Pennsylvania, United States	
Win	3–1	Chase Owens	Decision (unanimous)	Gladiators of the Cage: North Shore	January 26, 2013	3	5:00	Pittsburgh, Pennsylvania, United States	Middleweight debut.
Loss	2–1	Mojtaba Najim Wali	Submission (armbar)	Caged Power 2	September 8, 2012	3	1:45	Morgantown, West Virginia, United States	
Win	2–0	Marcus Finch	Decision (split)	Gladiators of the Cage: Road to Glory 2	April 14, 2012	3	5:00	Kittanning, Pennsylvania, United States	
Win	1–0	Eddie Hardison	Submission (rear-naked choke)	American MMA Fight League 4: Fight Night	February 17, 2012	2	2:57	West Newton, Pennsylvania, United States	

== Grappling record ==
2 Matches, 2 (2 Submissions), 0 Losses, 0 Draws
Result	Rec.	Opponent	Method	Event	Division	Type	Year	Location
Win	2–0–0	(United States) Jason Robinson	Submission (Choke)	GFC 2	Supermatch	Gi	April, 28th 2019	(United States) State College, PA
Win	1–0–0	(United States) Connor Watson	Submission (Choke)	GFC 2	Supermatch	Gi	April, 28th 2019	(United States) State College, PA

== See also ==
- List of current Bellator fighters
- List of male mixed martial artists
