= Geane Herrera =

American mixed martial arts fighter (1990–2024)

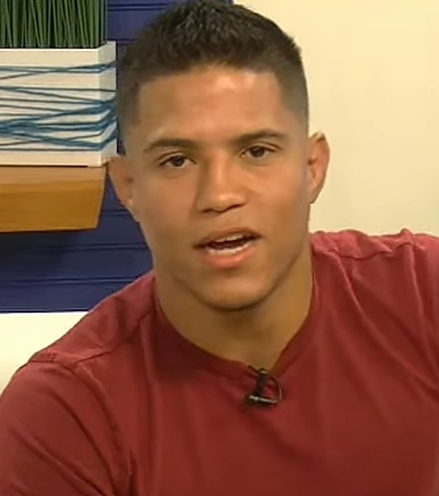
- Herrera in 2015
- Born: Geane Carlos Herrera; May 27, 1990; Duarte, California, U.S.
- Died: May 18, 2024 (aged 33); Tampa, Florida, U.S.
- Other names: The Revolutionary
- Nationality: Colombian
- Height: 5 ft 5 in (1.65 m)
- Weight: 125 lb (57 kg; 8.9 st)
- Division: Flyweight
- Reach: 66.0 in (168 cm)
- Style: Brazilian Jiu-Jitsu
- Stance: Orthodox
- Fighting out of: Tampa, Florida, United States
- Team: The Spartan Gym
- Rank: Brown belt in Brazilian Jiu-Jitsu under Bill Banks
- Years active: 2011–2024

Mixed martial arts record
- Total: 13
- Wins: 10
- By knockout: 2
- By submission: 6
- By decision: 2
- Losses: 3
- By decision: 3
- Draws: 0

Other information
- Children: 1
- Mixed martial arts record from Sherdog

Geane Carlos Herrera (/dʒɑːn/; May 27, 1990 – May 18, 2024) was an American mixed martial artist who competed in the Flyweight division. He is best known for his stint in the Ultimate Fighting Championship (UFC).

== Background ==
Geane Carlos Herrera was born on May 27, 1990, in Duarte, California, but moved to Cali, Colombia, with his mother and sister when he was a baby. The family lived there for nine years before returning to the United States.

== Mixed martial arts career ==
Herrera made his professional mixed martial arts debut in March 2011.

He competed primarily for regional organizations in the Southeastern United States where he amassed an undefeated record of 8–0, before signing with the UFC on the heels of a first round finish of Josh Rave in July 2014.

=== Ultimate Fighting Championship ===
Herrera made his promotional debut against Ray Borg on August 8, 2015, at UFC Fight Night 73. He lost the fight by unanimous decision.

Herrera was tabbed as a short notice replacement to face Joby Sanchez on December 11, 2015, at The Ultimate Fighter 22 Finale, where he filled in for Justin Scoggins. After a back-and-forth two rounds, Herrera earned a TKO finish in the final minute of the second round.

Herrera next faced Ali Bagautinov on June 18, 2016, at UFC Fight Night 89. He lost the fight via unanimous decision.

Herrera faced Ben Nguyen on November 27, 2016, at UFC Fight Night 101. He lost the fight via unanimous decision and was subsequently released from the UFC.

=== Post-UFC career ===
Over a year removed from his release, Herrera would go on to face Darren Mima at ACB 85 on April 21, 2018. He won the fight via first-round submission.

== Bare knuckle boxing ==
In 2019, Herrera participated in BKFC tryouts and received a contract to the organization. He was scheduled to make his debut against Abdiel Velazquez at BKFC 8 on October 19, 2019. However, the bout did not materialize due to an unknown reason.

Herrera eventually made his debut on July 23, 2021, at BKFC 19. He faced Abdiel Velazquez and won the fight via TKO in the second round.

== Personal life and death ==
Herrera had a son, born in 2007. On the 18th of May 2024 at around 10:45 p.m, Herrera was driving his motorcycle on Gandy Bridge when he collided into the back of another vehicle at a high speed. He then struck a concrete barrier and was thrown from his motorcycle, TMZ reported. Herrera was pronounced dead at the scene. He was 33.

== Mixed martial arts record ==
Professional record breakdown
13 matches	10 wins	3 losses
By knockout	2	0
By submission	6	0
By decision	2	3

Res.	Record	Opponent	Method	Event	Date	Round	Time	Location	Notes
Win	10–3	Darren Mima	Submission (rear-naked choke)	ACB 85	April 21, 2018	1	1:53	Rimini, Italy	
Loss	9–3	Ben Nguyen	Decision (unanimous)	UFC Fight Night: Whittaker vs. Brunson	November 27, 2016	3	5:00	Melbourne, Australia	
Loss	9–2	Ali Bagautinov	Decision (unanimous)	UFC Fight Night: MacDonald vs. Thompson	June 18, 2016	3	5:00	Ottawa, Ontario, Canada	
Win	9–1	Joby Sanchez	TKO (punches)	The Ultimate Fighter: Team McGregor vs. Team Faber Finale	December 11, 2015	2	4:28	Las Vegas, Nevada, United States	
Loss	8–1	Ray Borg	Decision (unanimous)	UFC Fight Night: Teixeira vs. Saint Preux	August 8, 2015	3	5:00	Nashville, Tennessee, United States	
Win	8–0	Josh Rave	TKO (punches)	RFA 25	April 10, 2015	1	4:09	Sioux Falls, South Dakota, United States	
Win	7–0	Seth Marquez	Submission (triangle choke)	Conflict MMA 21	October 11, 2014	1	2:13	Savannah, Georgia, United States	
Win	6–0	Josh Mercado	Submission (rear-naked choke)	Real Fighting Championships 30	February 28, 2014	1	1:50	Tampa, Florida, United States	
Win	5–0	Mitchell Chamale	Decision (unanimous)	Real Fighting Championships 28	July 26, 2013	3	5:00	Tampa, Florida, United States	
Win	4–0	Jared Crawford	Submission (triangle choke)	Real Fighting Championships 27	July 27, 2012	1	2:39	Tampa, Florida, United States	
Win	3–0	Calvin Martin	Submission (rear-naked choke)	Real Fighting Championships 24	July 29, 2011	1	0:57	Tampa, Florida, United States	
Win	2–0	Jovan White	Submission (rear naked-choke)	AOF 12	April 2, 2011	1	2:16	Jacksonville, Florida, United States	
Win	1–0	Andrew Connors	Decision (unanimous)	Real Fighting Championships 23	March 18, 2011	3	5:00	Tampa, Florida, United States	

== Bare knuckle boxing record ==
Professional record breakdown
1 match	1 win	0 losses
By knockout	1	0

Res.	Record	Opponent	Method	Event	Date	Round	Time	Location	Notes
Win	1-0	Abdiel Velazquez	TKO (punches)	BKFC 19	July 23, 2021	2	0:14	Tampa, Florida, United States	

== See also ==
- List of current UFC fighters
- List of male mixed martial artists
