= UFC 199 =

UFC mixed martial arts event in 2016

UFC 199: Rockhold vs. Bisping 2
- The poster for UFC 199: Rockhold vs. Bisping 2
- Promotion: Ultimate Fighting Championship
- Date: June 4, 2016
- Venue: The Forum
- City: Inglewood, California
- Attendance: 15,587
- Total gate: $2,168,675
- Buyrate: 283,000-320,000

Event chronology
UFC Fight Night: Almeida vs. Garbrandt	UFC 199: Rockhold vs. Bisping 2	UFC Fight Night: MacDonald vs. Thompson

UFC 199: Rockhold vs. Bisping 2 was a mixed martial arts event held on June 4, 2016, at The Forum in Inglewood, California.

== Background ==
While this was the first time the organization has held an event at the venue, it was the fifth time that UFC has hosted an event in Los Angeles County. Previous UFC events in the area took place at the Staples Center.

The event was expected to be headlined by a UFC Middleweight Championship rematch between current champion Luke Rockhold and former champion Chris Weidman. They previously met at UFC 194, when Rockhold won Weidman's title via fourth-round TKO. However, Weidman pulled out on May 17 due to a large extrusion herniation on his neck. The first replacement choice was former Strikeforce Middleweight Champion Ronaldo Souza, who lost his title to Rockhold in 2011, but he injured his meniscus in a win at UFC 198 against former UFC Light Heavyweight Champion Vitor Belfort. Therefore, he was replaced by The Ultimate Fighter 3 winner Michael Bisping. The fight was also a rematch as the two met previously in November 2014 at UFC Fight Night: Rockhold vs. Bisping, with Rockhold winning via submission in the second round.

The co-main event featured a UFC Bantamweight Championship trilogy bout between current two-time champion Dominick Cruz and former WEC Featherweight Champion Urijah Faber. The pairing first met at featherweight on WEC 26 in 2007, where Faber defeated Cruz via guillotine choke to defend his title. The rematch took place on UFC 132 in 2011, when Cruz defended his title for the first time via unanimous decision.

A lightweight bout between Evan Dunham and The Ultimate Fighter: Brazil 2 winner Leonardo Santos, originally scheduled for UFC 198, was moved to this event after a minor injury to Dunham delayed the matchup a few weeks. Subsequently, Santos pulled out on April 29 due to an undisclosed injury and was replaced by James Vick. In turn, Dunham pulled out of that pairing on May 5 for undisclosed reasons and was replaced by Beneil Dariush.

In January 2016, former UFC Lightweight and Welterweight Champion B.J. Penn announced his intention to return to active competition in the featherweight division after an 18-month "retirement" and was expected to compete at UFC 197. However, Penn's return was delayed after an investigation into criminal allegations made against him was launched. After the UFC concluded that no criminal or civil charges would be filed, the organization announced that he would face Dennis Siver at this event. In turn, Siver pulled out on May 10 due to an undisclosed injury. He was replaced by Cole Miller. Subsequently, Penn himself was removed from the card on May 23 after he was flagged for a potential anti-doping violation: the use of an IV in excess of 50 ml in a six-hour period during a March 25 out-of-competition sample collection. He was replaced by Alex Caceres.

A lightweight bout between John Makdessi and Mehdi Baghdad was originally scheduled for this event, but on April 28 it was announced that the bout was moved to UFC Fight Night: dos Anjos vs. Alvarez.

The event marked the first time fighters were allowed to weigh in for their bouts in the morning (starting 10 a.m.), rather than the traditional time of 4 p.m. used for public proceedings. They weighed in with a California State Athletic Commission (CSAC) official looking on so they would have less time to be dehydrated after their weight cuts and more time to rehydrate after making weight. They were back on hand to stand on the scale – ceremoniously, for the fans and media – and face off with their opponents. This is part of new measures for fighters' safety, with the CSAC creating new rules that will eventually be adapted to all the other athletic commissions.

During the main card broadcast, the UFC announced that UFC 8 and Ultimate Ultimate 96 tournaments winner Don Frye will be inducted to the UFC's Hall of Fame at the "International Fight Week" in July, one day after UFC 200.

== Results ==
Main Card
Weight class				Method	Round	Time	Notes
Middleweight	Michael Bisping	def.	Luke Rockhold (c)	KO (punches)	1	3:36	(Note: For the UFC Middleweight Championship.)
Bantamweight	Dominick Cruz (c)	def.	Urijah Faber	Decision (unanimous) (50–45, 50–45, 49–46)	5	5:00	(Note: For the UFC Bantamweight Championship.)
Featherweight	Max Holloway	def.	Ricardo Lamas	Decision (unanimous) (30–27, 30–27, 30–27)	3	5:00
Middleweight	Dan Henderson	def.	Héctor Lombard	KO (elbow)	2	1:27
Lightweight	Dustin Poirier	def.	Bobby Green	KO (punches)	1	2:53
Preliminary Card (Fox Sports 1)
Featherweight	Brian Ortega	def.	Clay Guida	KO (knee)	3	4:40
Lightweight	Beneil Dariush	def.	James Vick	KO (punch)	1	4:16
Women's Strawweight	Jéssica Andrade	def.	Jessica Penne	TKO (punches)	2	2:56
Featherweight	Alex Caceres	def.	Cole Miller	Decision (unanimous) (29–28, 29–28, 30–27)	3	5:00
Preliminary Card (UFC Fight Pass)
Welterweight	Sean Strickland	def.	Tom Breese	Decision (split) (28–29, 29–28, 29–28)	3	5:00
Light Heavyweight	Henrique da Silva	def.	Jonathan Wilson	TKO (punches)	2	4:11
Middleweight	Kevin Casey	vs.	Elvis Mutapčić	Draw (split) (28–29, 29–28, 28–28)	3	5:00
Lightweight	Polo Reyes	def.	Dong Hyun Ma	KO (punches)	3	1:52

== Bonus awards ==
The following fighters were awarded $50,000 bonuses:

- Fight of the Night: Marco Polo Reyes vs. Dong Hyun Ma
- Performance of the Night: Michael Bisping and Dan Henderson

== Reported payout ==
The following is the reported payout to the fighters as reported to the California State Athletic Commission. It does not include sponsor money or "locker room" bonuses often given by the UFC and also do not include the UFC's traditional "fight night" bonuses.

- Michael Bisping: $250,000 (no win bonus) def. Luke Rockhold: $250,000
- Dominick Cruz: $350,000 (no win bonus) def. Urijah Faber: $160,000
- Max Holloway: $150,000 ($75,000 win bonus) def. Ricardo Lamas: $53,000
- Dan Henderson: $800,000 ($200,000 win bonus) def. Hector Lombard: $53,000
- Dustin Poirier: $110,000 ($55,000 win bonus) def. Bobby Green: $24,000
- Brian Ortega: $46,000 ($23,000 win bonus) def. Clay Guida: $55,000
- Beneil Dariush: $62,000 ($31,000 win bonus) vs. James Vick: $23,000
- Jéssica Andrade: $40,000 ($20,000 win bonus) def. Jessica Penne: $20,000
- Alex Caceres: $48,000 ($24,000 win bonus) def. Cole Miller: $33,000
- Sean Strickland: $46,000 ($23,000 win bonus) def. Tom Breese: $19,000
- Luis Henrique da Silva: $20,000 ($10,000 win bonus) def. Jonathan Wilson: $12,000
- Kevin Casey: $15,000 vs. Elvis Mutapcic: $16,000 ^
- Polo Reyes: $24,000 ($12,000 win bonus) def. Dong Hyun Ma: $10,000

^ Both fighters earned show money; bout declared draw.

== See also ==
- List of UFC events
- 2016 in UFC
