= Shane Howell =

American mixed martial artist (born 1983)

- Born: Shane Howell; November 28, 1983 (age 42); Ada, Oklahoma, United States
- Other names: Insane
- Height: 5 ft 8 in (1.73 m)
- Weight: 125 lb (57 kg; 8.9 st)
- Division: Flyweight; Bantamweight
- Reach: 69.5 in (177 cm)
- Fighting out of: Oklahoma City, Oklahoma, United States
- Team: R-1 MMA Training Center
- Years active: 2007–present

Mixed martial arts record
- Total: 23
- Wins: 13
- By knockout: 4
- By submission: 7
- By decision: 2
- Losses: 10
- By knockout: 1
- By submission: 5
- By decision: 4

Other information
- Mixed martial arts record from Sherdog

Shane Howell (born November 28, 1983), is an American mixed martial artist who most recently competed in the flyweight division of the Ultimate Fighting Championship. A professional MMA competitor since 2007, Howell has also competed for the promotions Bellator MMA and King of the Cage.

== Ultimate Fighting Championship ==
Howell amassed a record of 13-7 before joining the Ultimate Fighting Championship in 2014.

Howell made his UFC debut replacing an injured Ryan Benoit against Ray Borg on June 28, 2014, at UFC Fight Night 44. He lost the fight via submission in the first round.

Howell faced Paddy Holohan on January 18, 2015, at UFC Fight Night 59. He lost the fight by unanimous decision and was subsequently released from the organization.

== Championships and accomplishments ==
- Xtreme Fighting League
  - XFL Bantamweight Championship (One time)

== Mixed martial arts record ==
Professional record breakdown
23 matches	13 wins	10 losses
By knockout	4	1
By submission	7	5
By decision	2	4

Res.	Record	Opponent	Method	Event	Date	Round	Time	Location	Notes
Loss	13–10	Ryan Hollis	Decision (unanimous)	Freestyle Cage Fighting 50	September 19, 2015	5	5:00	Shawnee, Oklahoma, United States	For FCF Bantamweight Championship
Loss	13–9	Paddy Holohan	Decision (unanimous)	UFC Fight Night: McGregor vs. Siver	January 18, 2015	3	5:00	Boston, Massachusetts, United States	
Loss	13–8	Ray Borg	Technical Submission (rear-naked choke)	UFC Fight Night: Swanson vs. Stephens	June 28, 2014	1	2:17	San Antonio, Texas, United States	
Win	13–7	Jimmy Van Horn	TKO (punches)	KOTC - Prohibited	March 17, 2012	2	2:40	Norman, Oklahoma, United States	
Win	12–7	Daniel Armendariz	TKO (punches)	Harrah Fight Night	October 22, 2011	1	4:34	Harrah, Oklahoma, United States	
Win	11–7	Francisco Barragan	Decision (unanimous)	Freestyle Cage Fighting 48	July 23, 2011	3	5:00	Shawnee, Oklahoma, United States	
Win	10–7	Mark Oshiro	Submission (D'arce choke)	Bellator 42	April 23, 2011	1	4:15	Concho, Oklahoma, United States	
Win	9–7	Tony Quintero	Submission (choke)	Freestyle Cage Fighting 46	April 9, 2011	1	1:17	Shawnee, Oklahoma, United States	
Win	8–7	Lewis McKenzie	Submission (guillotine choke)	Xtreme Fighting League	October 22, 2010	4	1:44	Tulsa, Oklahoma, United States	Won XFL Bantamweight Championship
Loss	7–7	Jason Sampson	Submission (choke)	Bricktown Brawl 5	June 25, 2010	1	4:14	Oklahoma City, Oklahoma, United States	
Win	7–6	Christopher Hanes	Submission (choke)	Red Dragon Promotions: Enter the Septagon	May 8, 2010	1	1:22	Lawton, Oklahoma, United States	
Win	6–6	Lewis McKenzie	TKO (punches)	5150 Combat League / Xtreme Fighting League	January 16, 2010	1	2:44	Tulsa, Oklahoma, United States	
Win	5–6	Kody Powell	Submission (armbar)	5150 Combat League: Seasons Beatings	December 11, 2009	1	3:52	Tulsa, Oklahoma, United States	
Loss	4–6	Jerod Spoon	Decision (unanimous)	Bricktown Brawl 2	August 29, 2009	3	5:00	Oklahoma City, Oklahoma, United States	
Win	4–5	Tim Elliott	Submission (triangle choke)	Harrah Fight Night	June 27, 2009	3	2:25	Harrah, Oklahoma, United States	
Loss	3–5	Danny Times	Submission (rear-naked choke)	HRP - Snakebite Fight 2	October 11, 2008	1	0:53	Tulsa, Oklahoma, United States	
Loss	3–4	Dan Sulivan	TKO (punches)	Freestyle Cage Fighting 21	July 26, 2008	2	1:08	Tulsa, Oklahoma, United States	
Loss	3–3	Joe Coca	Submission (rear-naked choke)	Freestyle Cage Fighting 17	March 15, 2008	2	2:04	Shawnee, Oklahoma, United States	
Win	3–2	Cody Castillo	TKO (punches)	Freestyle Cage Fighting 15	December 15, 2007	1	0:55	Shawnee, Oklahoma, United States	
Loss	2–2	Jared Lopez	Decision (unanimous)	Freestyle Cage Fighting 14	October 13, 2007	3	3:00	Shawnee, Oklahoma, United States	
Loss	2–1	Josh Duplar	Submission (rear-naked choke)	Freestyle Cage Fighting 11	June 23, 2007	1	0:52	Shawnee, Oklahoma, United States	
Win	2–0	Victor Veloquio	Submission (guillotine choke)	Freestyle Cage Fighting 9	March 10, 2007	3	0:28	Ponca City, Oklahoma, United States	
Win	1–0	Arnulfo Veloquio	Decision (unanimous)	Freestyle Cage Fighting 7	January 20, 2007	3	3:00	Shawnee, Oklahoma, United States	

== See also ==
- List of current UFC fighters
- List of male mixed martial artists
