= Ray Borg =

American mixed martial artist

- Born: August 4, 1993 (age 33); Tucson, Arizona, U.S.
- Other names: The Tazmexican Devil
- Height: 5 ft 4 in (163 cm)
- Weight: 135 lb (61 kg; 9 st 9 lb)
- Division: Flyweight (2012–2020); Bantamweight (2019)
- Reach: 63 in (160 cm)
- Fighting out of: Albuquerque, New Mexico, United States
- Team: FitNHB (until 2016); Jackson Wink MMA Academy (2016–2019); Jackson's MMA Acoma (2019–present)
- Years active: 2012–2023

Mixed martial arts record
- Total: 21
- Wins: 16
- By knockout: 1
- By submission: 6
- By decision: 9
- Losses: 5
- By submission: 1
- By decision: 4

Other information
- Mixed martial arts record from Sherdog

Ray Borg (born August 4, 1993) is an American former professional mixed martial artist who competed in the Flyweight and Bantamweight divisions. A professional MMA competitor until 2023, Borg is best known for his 12–fight tenure in the Ultimate Fighting Championship where he competed primarily in the Flyweight division. Before that, he made a name for himself fighting mostly in his native Southwestern United States, competing in promotions like King of the Cage and Legacy Fighting Championship.

== Mixed martial arts career ==
=== Ultimate Fighting Championship ===
After a successful career in United States, with an undefeated 6–0 mixed martial arts record, it was revealed in April 2014, that Borg had signed with the UFC.

Borg made his UFC debut against Dustin Ortiz on April 19, 2014, at UFC on Fox: Werdum vs. Browne. He lost the fight via split decision.

Borg was scheduled to face Ryan Benoit, at UFC Fight Night: Swanson vs. Stephens. However, due to an injury, Benoit was replaced by promotional newcomer Shane Howell. Borg won the fight via submission (rear-naked choke) in the first round. The win also won Borg his first Performance of the Night bonus award.

Borg was briefly linked to a potential fight against Richie Vaculik on November 8, 2014, at UFC Fight Night 55. However, Borg was forced to pull out of the event due to injury and was replaced by Neil Seery. Subsequently, Seery pulled out of that bout as well and was replaced by Louis Smolka.

Borg faced Chris Kelades on February 14, 2015, at UFC Fight Night 60. Borg won the one sided fight via submission in the third round, earning him his second consecutive Performance of the Night award.

Borg faced promotional newcomer Geane Herrera on August 8, 2015, at UFC Fight Night 73. He won the fight by unanimous decision.

Borg faced Justin Scoggins on February 6, 2016, at UFC Fight Night 82. He lost the fight via unanimous decision.

Borg was expected to face Fredy Serrano on July 30, 2016, at UFC 201. However, Borg pulled out on July 21 due to injury and was replaced by Ryan Benoit.

Following a quick recovery, Borg was quickly rescheduled and was expected to face Ian McCall on September 10, 2016, at UFC 203. However, Borg pulled out of the fight on September 7 citing an illness. With no time to find a suitable replacement, McCall was removed from the card.

Borg next faced Louis Smolka on December 30, 2016, at UFC 207. At the weigh-ins, Borg missed weight for the bout, coming in at 129.5 pounds. As a result, he was fined 30% of his fight purse, which went to Smolka, who agreed to take a catchweight bout. Borg won the fight by unanimous decision.

Borg faced Jussier Formiga on March 11, 2017, at UFC Fight Night 106. He won the fight via unanimous decision.

Borg was expected to face then champion Demetrious Johnson on September 9, 2017, at UFC 215 for the UFC Flyweight Championship. In turn, the fight was canceled a day before the event, as Borg was forced to withdraw from the fight on Thursday evening due to illness. According to multiple sources, Borg has been battling an illness this week and was deemed unfit to fight by UFC doctors. The bout was quickly rescheduled and took place the following month at UFC 216. Borg lost the bout via suplex to armbar in the fifth round.

Borg was expected to face Brandon Moreno on April 7, 2018, at UFC 223, but was removed from the card after being injured by glass from a bus window that was smashed by Conor McGregor and his entourage. The pairing was left intact and quickly rescheduled and was expected to take place on May 19, 2018, at UFC Fight Night 129. However, in late April, Borg withdrew from the bout to take care of his child who was recovering from brain surgery.

Borg was expected to face Joseph Benavidez on November 10, 2018, at UFC Fight Night 139. However, on November 7, 2018, it was reported that the bout was cancelled due to undisclosed medical issues for Borg.

Borg was expected to face Pingyuan Liu in a bantamweight bout on March 30, 2019, at UFC on ESPN 2. However, it was reported on March 13, that Liu was replaced by newcomer Kyler Phillips for an undisclosed reason. In turn, Phillips was removed from the card on March 25 for undisclosed reasons and replaced by Casey Kenney. At the weigh-ins, Borg weighed in at 137.75 lbs, 1.75 pound over the bantamweight non-title fight limit of 136 lbs. He was fined 20% of his fight purse and his bout against Kenney proceeded at catchweight. Borg would go on to lose the fight by a controversial unanimous decision.

Borg faced Gabriel Silva on July 20, 2019, at UFC on ESPN 4. He won the fight via unanimous decision.

Borg faced Rogério Bontorin on February 15, 2020, at UFC Fight Night: Anderson vs. Błachowicz 2. At the weigh-ins on February 14, Borg missed weight for the bout, weighing in at 128 pounds, 2 pounds over the non-title flyweight limit of 126 pounds. The bout proceeded at a catchweight and Borg forfeited 20% of his purse and he was not eligible for any post-fight bonus awards. This marked the fourth time in Borg's career that he has missed weight. Borg won the fight by unanimous decision.

Borg faced Ricky Simón on May 13, 2020, at UFC Fight Night: Smith vs. Teixeira. He lost the fight via split decision.

Borg was scheduled to face Merab Dvalishvili on June 13, 2020, at UFC on ESPN: Eye vs. Calvillo. However, Borg withdrew from the event for personal reasons and was replaced by promotional newcomer Gustavo Lopez. The bout instead took place at a catchweight of 140 pounds.

Borg was scheduled to face Nate Maness on August 1, 2020, at UFC Fight Night: Brunson vs. Shahbazyan. However, Borg was removed from the fight on the day of the event's weigh-in for undisclosed reasons. Maness went on to face Johnny Muñoz in a featherweight bout. Borg was subsequently released from the UFC.

=== Post UFC ===
Borg made his return against Jesse Arnett at UAE Warriors on June 19, 2021. He won the bout via unanimous decision.

Borg was then scheduled to challenge Vinicius de Oliveira for the UAE Warriors Bantamweight Championship at UAE Warriors 23 on October 29, 2021. However, Borg withdrew from the bout after contracting with COVID-19 and was replaced by Sylvester Chipfumbu.

Borg faced Cody Gibson on January 28, 2022, at Eagle FC 44: Spong vs. Kharitonov. He won the bout via unanimous decision.

Borg faced Ricky Bandejas at Eagle FC 46 on March 11, 2022. He won the close bout via split decision.

=== Bellator MMA ===
On February 21, 2023, it was announced that Borg had signed with Bellator MMA.

Borg was scheduled to make his promotional debut moving down to Flyweight to face Kyoji Horiguchi on April 22, 2023, at Bellator 295. However, the day of the weigh-ins, due to weight-management complications for Borg, the bout was scrapped. He was subsequently released from the promotion. After the release, Borg announced that he was retiring from MMA.

=== Global Fight League ===
Borg was scheduled to face former WSOF Bantamweight Champion Marlon Moraes in the inaugural Global Fight League event on May 24, 2025 at GFL 1. However, all GFL events were cancelled indefinitely.

== Personal life ==
Borg and his wife Amanda have a son, Anthony, who was born with hydrocephalus in 2018. Borg is also the legal guardian of his niece.

== Championships and accomplishments ==
=== Mixed martial arts ===
- Ultimate Fighting Championship
  - Performance of the Night (Two times) vs. Chris Kelades and Shane Howell.

== Mixed martial arts record ==
Professional record breakdown
21 matches	16 wins	5 losses
By knockout	1	0
By submission	6	1
By decision	9	4

Res.	Record	Opponent	Method	Event	Date	Round	Time	Location	Notes
Win	16–5	Ricky Bandejas	Decision (split)	Eagle FC 46	March 11, 2022	3	5:00	Miami, Florida, United States	
Win	15–5	Cody Gibson	Decision (unanimous)	Eagle FC 44	January 28, 2022	3	5:00	Miami, Florida, United States	
Win	14–5	Jesse Arnett	Decision (unanimous)	UAE Warriors 20	June 19, 2021	3	5:00	Abu Dhabi, United Arab Emirates	
Loss	13–5	Ricky Simón	Decision (split)	UFC Fight Night: Smith vs. Teixeira	May 13, 2020	3	5:00	Jacksonville, Florida, United States	
Win	13–4	Rogério Bontorin	Decision (unanimous)	UFC Fight Night: Anderson vs. Błachowicz 2	February 15, 2020	3	5:00	Rio Rancho, New Mexico, United States	Flyweight bout; Borg missed weight (128 lb) and the bout was changed to a Catchweight.
Win	12–4	Gabriel Silva	Decision (unanimous)	UFC on ESPN: dos Anjos vs. Edwards	July 20, 2019	3	5:00	San Antonio, Texas, United States	
Loss	11–4	Casey Kenney	Decision (unanimous)	UFC on ESPN: Barboza vs. Gaethje	March 30, 2019	3	5:00	Philadelphia, Pennsylvania, United States	Return to Bantamweight; Borg missed weight (137 lb).
Loss	11–3	Demetrious Johnson	Submission (armbar)	UFC 216	October 7, 2017	5	3:15	Las Vegas, Nevada, United States	For the UFC Flyweight Championship.
Win	11–2	Jussier Formiga	Decision (unanimous)	UFC Fight Night: Belfort vs. Gastelum	March 11, 2017	3	5:00	Fortaleza, Brazil	
Win	10–2	Louis Smolka	Decision (unanimous)	UFC 207	December 30, 2016	3	5:00	Las Vegas, Nevada, United States	Catchweight (129.5 lb) bout; Borg missed weight.
Loss	9–2	Justin Scoggins	Decision (unanimous)	UFC Fight Night: Hendricks vs. Thompson	February 6, 2016	3	5:00	Las Vegas, Nevada, United States	
Win	9–1	Geane Herrera	Decision (unanimous)	UFC Fight Night: Teixeira vs. Saint Preux	August 8, 2015	3	5:00	Nashville, Tennessee, United States	Catchweight (126.75 lb) bout; Borg missed weight.
Win	8–1	Chris Kelades	Submission (kimura)	UFC Fight Night: Henderson vs. Thatch	February 14, 2015	3	2:56	Broomfield, Colorado, United States	Performance of the Night.
Win	7–1	Shane Howell	Technical Submission (rear-naked choke)	UFC Fight Night: Swanson vs. Stephens	June 28, 2014	1	2:17	San Antonio, Texas, United States	Performance of the Night.
Loss	6–1	Dustin Ortiz	Decision (split)	UFC on Fox: Werdum vs. Browne	April 19, 2014	3	5:00	Orlando, Florida, United States	
Win	6–0	Nick Urso	Submission (rear-naked choke)	Legacy FC 30	April 4, 2014	2	4:01	Albuquerque, New Mexico, United States	
Win	5–0	Jeimeson Saudino	Submission (rear-naked choke)	SCS 20	November 23, 2013	2	4:22	Hinton, Oklahoma, United States	Won the SCS Flyweight Championship.
Win	4–0	Angelo Sanchez	Decision (unanimous)	Triple A MMA 3: North vs. South	August 18, 2013	3	5:00	Albuquerque, New Mexico, United States	
Win	3–0	Lee Lindow	TKO (punches)	KOTC: World Championships	May 25, 2013	1	1:59	Scottsdale, Arizona, United States	
Win	2–0	Peter Baltimore	Technical Submission (rear-naked choke)	KOTC: Regulators	January 19, 2013	1	4:03	Scottsdale, Arizona, United States	
Win	1–0	Gene Perez	Submission (rear-naked choke)	KOTC: Ignite	August 11, 2012	1	3:01	Santa Fe, New Mexico, United States	

== See also ==
- List of male mixed martial artists
