= UFC Fight Night: Teixeira vs. Saint Preux =

UFC mixed martial arts event in 2015

- The poster for UFC Fight Night: Teixeira vs. Saint Preux
- Promotion: Ultimate Fighting Championship
- Date: August 8, 2015
- Venue: Bridgestone Arena
- City: Nashville, Tennessee
- Attendance: 7,539
- Total gate: $454,551

Event chronology
UFC 190: Rousey vs. Correia	UFC Fight Night: Teixeira vs. Saint Preux	UFC Fight Night: Holloway vs. Oliveira

UFC Fight Night: Teixeira vs. Saint Preux (also known as UFC Fight Night 73) was a mixed martial arts event held on August 8, 2015, at Bridgestone Arena in Nashville, Tennessee, United States.

== Background ==
The event was headlined by a light heavyweight bout between former title challenger Glover Teixeira and Tennessee resident Ovince Saint Preux.

Matt Van Buren was briefly linked to a bout with promotional newcomer Jonathan Wilson at the event. However, Van Buren was removed from the card in early June citing injury and was replaced by Jared Cannonier. In turn, Cannonier was forced to pull out due to injury and was replaced by Chris Dempsey.

Joe Riggs was expected to face Uriah Hall at this event. However, Riggs was forced to pull out due to injury and was replaced by UFC newcomer Oluwale Bamgbose.

Ian McCall was expected to face Dustin Ortiz at this event. However, McCall was forced to pull out of the event due to injury and was replaced by Willie Gates. Gates had previously fought only 27 days before the event, when he defeated Darrell Montague at The Ultimate Fighter 21 Finale.

Ray Borg missed weight on his first attempt at the weigh-ins, coming in at 126.75 lb. After having made no attempts to cut further, he was fined 20 percent of his fight purse, which went to his opponent Geane Herrera.

== Results ==
Main Card (Fox Sports 1)
Weight class				Method	Round	Time	Notes
Light Heavyweight	Glover Teixeira	def.	Ovince Saint Preux	Technical Submission (rear-naked choke)	3	3:10
Lightweight	Beneil Dariush	def.	Michael Johnson	Decision (split) (29–28, 28–29, 29–28)	3	5:00
Middleweight	Derek Brunson	def.	Sam Alvey	TKO (punches)	1	2:19
Heavyweight	Jared Rosholt	def.	Timothy Johnson	Decision (unanimous) (29–28, 29–28, 29–28)	3	5:00
Women's Bantamweight	Amanda Nunes	def.	Sara McMann	Submission (rear-naked choke)	1	2:53
Catchweight (126.75 lb)	Ray Borg	def.	Geane Herrera	Decision (unanimous) (30–27, 30–27, 30–27)	3	5:00
Preliminary Card (Fox Sports 2)
Middleweight	Uriah Hall	def.	Oluwale Bamgbose	TKO (punches)	1	2:32
Middleweight	Chris Camozzi	def.	Tom Watson	Decision (unanimous) (29–27, 30–26, 29–27)	3	5:00	(Note: Watson was deducted one point in the second round for repeated groin strikes.)
Flyweight	Dustin Ortiz	def.	Willie Gates	TKO (elbows and punches)	3	2:58
Bantamweight	Frankie Saenz	def.	Sirwan Kakai	Decision (split) (28–29, 30–27, 30–27)	3	5:00
Preliminary Card (UFC Fight Pass)
Light Heavyweight	Jonathan Wilson	def.	Chris Dempsey	KO (punches)	1	0:50
Bantamweight	Marlon Vera	def.	Roman Salazar	Submission (triangle armbar)	2	2:15
Lightweight	Scott Holtzman	def.	Anthony Christodoulou	Submission (rear-naked choke)	3	2:40

== Bonus awards ==
The following fighters were awarded $50,000 bonuses:

- Fight of the Night: Glover Teixeira vs. Ovince Saint Preux
- Performance of the Night: Amanda Nunes and Marlon Vera

== See also ==
- List of UFC events
- 2015 in UFC
