= UFC Fight Night: Lineker vs. Dodson =

UFC mixed martial arts event in 2016

- The poster for UFC Fight Night: Lineker vs. Dodson
- Promotion: Ultimate Fighting Championship
- Date: October 1, 2016
- Venue: Moda Center
- City: Portland, Oregon
- Attendance: 6,240
- Total gate: $501,035

Event chronology
UFC Fight Night: Cyborg vs. Länsberg	UFC Fight Night: Lineker vs. Dodson	UFC 204: Bisping vs. Henderson 2

UFC Fight Night: Lineker vs. Dodson (also known as UFC Fight Night 96) was a mixed martial arts event produced by the Ultimate Fighting Championship that was held on October 1, 2016, at Moda Center in Portland, Oregon.

== Background ==
The event was the second that the organization hosted in Portland, with the first being UFC 102 in August 2009.

The event was headlined by a bantamweight bout between John Lineker and former two-time UFC Flyweight Championship challenger and The Ultimate Fighter: Team Bisping vs. Team Miller bantamweight winner John Dodson.

On September 9, two fighters pulled out from their bouts: Brian Ortega and Bobby Green were expected to face Hacran Dias and Josh Burkman, respectively. Ortega was replaced by Andre Fili, while Green was replaced by promotional newcomer Zak Ottow. Due to the late replacement, Burkman-Ottow was contested at welterweight.

Sergio Pettis was expected to face Louis Smolka at the event. However, Pettis pulled out of the fight on September 22 citing what his trainer described as "a minor injury". Smolka remained on the card and faced promotional newcomer Brandon Moreno, from The Ultimate Fighter: Tournament of Champions.

At the weigh-ins, three fighters, John Lineker, Alex Oliveira and Hacran Dias each missed the required weight limit for their respective fights. As a result, all three fighters were fined 20% of their fight purse, which went to their opponents.

== Results ==
Main Card (Fox Sports 1)
Weight class				Method	Round	Time	Notes
Catchweight (136.5 lb)	John Lineker	def.	John Dodson	Decision (split) (47–48, 48–47, 48–47)	5	5:00
Catchweight (161.5 lb)	Alex Oliveira	def.	Will Brooks	TKO (punches)	3	3:30
Welterweight	Zak Ottow	def.	Josh Burkman	Decision (split) (29–28, 28–29, 29–28)	3	5:00
Flyweight	Brandon Moreno	def.	Louis Smolka	Submission (guillotine choke)	1	2:23
Preliminary Card (Fox Sports 2)
Light Heavyweight	Luis Henrique da Silva	def.	Joachim Christensen	Submission (armbar)	2	4:43
Catchweight (148.5 lb)	Andre Fili	def.	Hacran Dias	Decision (unanimous) (29–28, 29–28, 29–28)	3	5:00
Heavyweight	Shamil Abdurakhimov	def.	Walt Harris	Decision (split) (28–29, 29–28, 29–28)	3	5:00
Welterweight	Elizeu Zaleski dos Santos	def.	Keita Nakamura	Decision (unanimous) (29–28, 29–28, 29–28)	3	5:00
Preliminary Card (UFC Fight Pass)
Middleweight	Nate Marquardt	def.	Tamdan McCrory	KO (punch and head kick)	2	4:44
Light Heavyweight	Ion Cuțelaba	def.	Jonathan Wilson	Decision (unanimous) (30–27, 30–27, 30–27)	3	5:00
Heavyweight	Curtis Blaydes	def.	Cody East	TKO (elbows)	2	2:02
Women's Bantamweight	Ketlen Vieira	def.	Kelly Faszholz	Decision (split) (28–29, 29–28, 29–28)	3	5:00

== Bonus awards ==
The following fighters were awarded $50,000 bonuses:

- Fight of the Night: None awarded
- Performance of the Night: Brandon Moreno, Luis Henrique da Silva, Nate Marquardt and Curtis Blaydes

== Reported payout ==
The following is the reported payout to the fighters as reported to the Oregon State Athletic Commission. It does not include sponsor money or "locker room" bonuses often given by the UFC and also do not include the UFC's traditional "fight night" bonuses.

- John Lineker: $72,000 (includes $40,000 win bonus) def. John Dodson: $38,000 ^
- Alex Oliveira: $43,200 (includes $24,000 win bonus) def. Will Brooks: $57,800 ^
- Zak Ottow: $24,000 (includes $12,000 win bonus) def. Josh Burkman: $54,000
- Brandon Moreno: $20,000 (includes $10,000 win bonus) def. Louis Smolka: $32,000
- Luis Henrique da Silva: $24,000 (includes $12,000 win bonus) def. Joachim Christensen: $10,000
- Andre Fili: $39,200 (includes $18,000 win bonus) def. Hacran Dias: $12,800 ^
- Shamil Abdurakhimov: $28,000 (includes $14,000 win bonus) def. Walt Harris: $12,000
- Elizeu Zaleski dos Santos: $24,000 (includes $12,000 win bonus) def. Keita Nakamura: $19,000
- Nate Marquardt: $112,000 (includes $56,000 win bonus) def. Tamdan McCrory: $15,000
- Ion Cuțelaba: $20,000 (includes $10,000 win bonus) def. Jonathan Wilson: $12,000
- Curtis Blaydes: $20,000 (includes $10,000 win bonus) def. Cody East: $10,000
- Ketlen Vieira: $20,000 (includes $10,000 win bonus) def. Kelly Faszholz: $10,000

^ John Lineker, Alex Oliveira and Hacran Dias were fined 20 percent of their purse for failing to make the required weight limit for their respective fights. That money was issued to their opponents, an OSAC official confirmed.

== See also ==
- List of UFC events
- 2016 in UFC
