= Jonathan Wilson (fighter) =

American mixed martial arts fighter

- Born: Jonathan Wilson; July 17, 1987 (age 39); San Bernardino, California, United States
- Other names: Johnny Bravo
- Height: 6 ft 2 in (1.88 m)
- Weight: 217 lb (98 kg; 15.5 st)
- Division: Heavyweight; Light Heavyweight; Middleweight
- Reach: 75 in (191 cm)
- Fighting out of: San Bernardino, California, United States
- Team: Millennia MMA Gym; Icon MMA
- Years active: 2013–present

Mixed martial arts record
- Total: 14
- Wins: 9
- By knockout: 6
- By submission: 1
- By decision: 2
- Losses: 5
- By knockout: 1
- By submission: 1
- By decision: 3

Other information
- Mixed martial arts record from Sherdog

Jonathan Wilson (born July 17, 1987) is an American professional mixed martial artist. A professional since 2013, he has competed for the UFC, Bellator MMA, and Taura MMA, where he was the Light Heavyweight champion.

== Background ==
Born and raised in San Bernardino, California, Wilson began training in MMA with fighter Lorenz Larkin in 2007.

== Mixed martial arts career ==
=== Early career ===
Following an outstanding amateur career where he went 9–0, capturing King of the Cage and Xplode Fight Series Amateur Light Heavyweight Championships, Wilson also won his first six fights as a professional Heavyweight before being signed by the Ultimate Fighting Championship.

=== Ultimate Fighting Championship ===
Wilson made his promotional debut against Chris Dempsey at UFC Fight Night 73 on August 8, 2015. He won the fight knockout in the first round.

Wilson faced Henrique da Silva at UFC 199 on June 4, 2016. He lost the fight TKO in the second round.

Wilson next faced Ion Cuțelaba at UFC Fight Night 96 on October 1, 2016. He lost the fight via unanimous decision.

Wilson faced Oskar Piechota in a middleweight bout on October 21, 2017 at UFC Fight Night: Cowboy vs. Till. He lost the fight via unanimous decision.

On August 12, 2019, it was reported that Wilson was released from the UFC.

=== Post-UFC career ===
After the release, Wilson faced Derek Eason at Gladiator Challenge: Holiday Beatings on December 14, 2019. He won the fight via first-round submission.

==== Taura MMA ====
Wilson next challenged Richardson Moreira for the Taura Light Heavyweight Championship at Taura MMA 11 on October 30, 2020. He won the fight and claimed the championship via unanimous decision.

==== Bellator MMA ====
Wilson announced that he was signing a multi-fight contract with Bellator and faced Jose Augusto in a Light heavyweight bout on April 2, 2021 at Bellator 255. He lost the bout in the first round via arm triangle choke.

== Mixed martial arts record ==
Professional record breakdown
14 matches	9 wins	5 losses
By knockout	6	1
By submission	1	1
By decision	2	3

Res.	Record	Opponent	Method	Event	Date	Round	Time	Location	Notes
Loss	9–5	Marcos Brigagão	Decision (unanimous)	Tuff-N-Uff 133	September 15, 2023	3	5:00	Las Vegas, Nevada, United States	
Loss	9–4	José Augusto Azevedo	Submission (arm-triangle choke)	Bellator 255	April 2, 2021	1	4:58	Uncasville, Connecticut, United States	
Win	9–3	Richardson Moreira	Decision (unanimous)	Taura MMA 11	October 30, 2020	5	5:00	Kissimmee, Florida, United States	Won the Taura Light Heavyweight Championship.
Win	8–3	Derek Eason	Submission (armbar)	Gladiator Challenge: Holiday Beatings	December 14, 2019	1	1:47	Hemet, California, United States	Return to Light Heavyweight.
Loss	7–3	Oskar Piechota	Decision (unanimous)	UFC Fight Night: Cowboy vs. Till	October 21, 2017	3	5:00	Gdańsk, Poland	Middleweight debut.
Loss	7–2	Ion Cuțelaba	Decision (unanimous)	UFC Fight Night: Lineker vs. Dodson	October 1, 2016	3	5:00	Portland, Oregon, United States	
Loss	7–1	Henrique da Silva	TKO (punches)	UFC 199	June 4, 2016	2	4:11	Inglewood, California, United States	
Win	7–0	Chris Dempsey	KO (punches)	UFC Fight Night: Teixeira vs. Saint Preux	August 8, 2015	1	0:50	Nashville, Tennessee, United States	Light Heavyweight debut.
Win	6–0	Daniel Ynojos	Submission (armbar)	Gladiator Challenge: Battle Ready	August 23, 2014	1	0:50	El Cajon, California, United States	
Win	5–0	Alex Putolu	Decision (unanimous)	Gladiator Challenge: Night of the Champions	July 19, 2014	3	3:00	Rancho Mirage, California, United States	
Win	4–0	Jamiah Williamson	TKO (punches)	Gladiator Challenge: Iron Fist	June 28, 2014	2	0:45	San Jacinto, California, United States	
Win	3–0	Aquill Stratt	KO (punch)	Gladiator Challenge: Nitro	April 5, 2014	1	1:46	San Jacinto, California, United States	
Win	2–0	Arsen Galstyan	TKO (punches)	Lights Out Promotions: Chaos at the Casino 3	November 23, 2013	1	1:45	Inglewood, California, United States	
Win	1–0	Ethan Cox	KO (punch)	Submission Promotions 3	September 7, 2013	1	2:14	Ontario, California, United States	Heavyweight debut.

== See also ==
- List of male mixed martial artists
