= Ion Cutelaba =

Moldovan mixed martial arist

- Born: 14 December 1993 (age 32); Chișinău, Moldova
- Other names: The Hulk
- Height: 6 ft 1 in (1.85 m)
- Weight: 205 lb (93 kg; 14.6 st)
- Division: Heavyweight; Light Heavyweight
- Reach: 75 in (191 cm)
- Stance: Orthodox
- Fighting out of: Chișinău, Moldova
- Team: Timoshkov Sport Club; CSA Moldova; MMA Factory
- Years active: 2012–present

Mixed martial arts record
- Total: 33
- Wins: 20
- By knockout: 13
- By submission: 4
- By decision: 3
- Losses: 11
- By knockout: 3
- By submission: 4
- By decision: 3
- By disqualification: 1
- Draws: 1
- No contests: 1

Other information
- Mixed martial arts record from Sherdog

Ion Cutelaba (born 14 December 1993) is a Moldovan professional mixed martial artist who currently competes in the Light Heavyweight division of the Ultimate Fighting Championship (UFC).

== Background ==
Born and raised in Chișinău, Cutelaba began training and competing in Greco-Roman wrestling as a clone. He additionally competed in Sambo and Judo, becoming a national champion in both. In 2012, representing Moldova, Cutelaba finished first in the 90 kg category of the European Sambo Championships.

== Mixed martial arts career ==
=== Early career ===
Cutelaba made his professional debut in April 2012, competing primarily for regional promotions across Eastern Europe. He amassed a record of 11-1 (1) before signing with the UFC in the spring of 2016.

=== Ultimate Fighting Championship ===
==== 2016 ====
Cutelaba made his promotional debut against Misha Cirkunov on 18 June 2016, at UFC Fight Night 89. He lost the fight via submission in the third round.

Cutelaba next faced Jonathan Wilson on 1 October 2016, at UFC Fight Night 96. He won the fight via unanimous decision.

Cutelaba next faced Jared Cannonier on 3 December 2016, at The Ultimate Fighter 24 Finale. He lost the fight via unanimous decision. Subsequently, both fighters earned Fight of the Night honors.

==== 2017 ====
Cutelaba faced Henrique da Silva on 11 June 2017, at UFC Fight Night 110. He won the fight via knockout in the opening minute of the first round.

Cutelaba was expected to face Gadzhimurad Antigulov on 4 November 2017, at UFC 217. However, Antigulov pulled out of the fight on 26 September citing an injury and was replaced by newcomer Michał Oleksiejczuk. In turn after the weigh-ins, Cutelaba was pulled from the event by USADA due to a potential Anti-Doping Policy violation stemming from its investigation into voluntary disclosures by Cutelaba during an out-of-competition sample collections on 18 and 19 October. He was provisionally suspended and the bout was scrapped. USADA handed down a six-month suspension for ozone therapy involving a blood transfusion which is prohibited under 2018 World Anti-Doping Agency (WADA) list on manipulation of blood component. Cutelaba became eligible to fight again on 6 May 2018.

==== 2018 ====
The bout with Antigulov eventually took place on 28 July 2018, at UFC on Fox 30. Cutelaba won the fight via TKO in the first round.

==== 2019 ====
Cutelaba was scheduled to face Glover Teixeira on 19 January 2019, at UFC Fight Night 143. However, on 10 January 2019, Cutelaba was pulled out of the bout due to an injury. The pair was rescheduled to meet at UFC Fight Night: Jacaré vs. Hermansson on 27 April 2019. Cutelaba lost via a rear-naked-choke submission at 3:37 in the second round.

Cutelaba faced Khalil Rountree Jr. on 28 September 2019, at UFC Fight Night 160. He won via TKO in the first round.

==== 2020 ====
Cutelaba faced Magomed Ankalaev on 29 February 2020, at UFC Fight Night 169. He lost the fight via TKO in the first round. The loss was controversial as referee Kevin MacDonald stopped the bout believing Cutelaba was out on his feet after a flurry of strikes from Ankalaev, which Cutelaba immediately protested. The stoppage was heavily criticized by media outlets, fighters, and fans as being premature. Cutelaba appealed the loss, which was subsequently denied by the Virginia athletic commission.

Due to the controversy of the stoppage, the UFC rebooked the pair on 18 April 2020, to meet at UFC 249. However, Ankalaev was forced to withdraw from the event due to COVID-19 pandemic travel restriction, with Cutelaba being rescheduled to face Ovince Saint Preux on April 25, 2020. However, on 9 April, UFC president Dana White announced that the event was postponed to a future date The rematch with Ankalaev was expected to take place on 15 August 2020, at UFC 252. Cutelaba then pulled out on 11 August after testing positive for COVID-19 and the bout was rescheduled for UFC Fight Night 175. However, the day of the event, the bout was once again scrapped after Cutelaba tested positive for COVID-19 for a second time. The bout rescheduled for the third time and they met on 24 October 2020 at UFC 254. Cutelaba lost the fight via knockout in round one.

==== 2021 ====
Cutelaba was scheduled to face Devin Clark on 1 May 2021, at UFC on ESPN: Reyes vs. Procházka. However, Clark pulled out from the event, citing injury, and he was replaced by Dustin Jacoby. Cutelaba dominated the first round, however Jacoby came back in the second and third rounds with the fight ending in a split draw.

The bout between Cutelaba and Clark took place on 18 September 2021, at UFC Fight Night 192. Cutelaba knocked down Clark in round one, going on to dominate the bout and won by unanimous decision.

==== 2022 ====
Cutelaba was scheduled to face Ryan Spann on 26 February 2022, at UFC Fight Night 202. However, Spann was pulled from the event due to injury and the bout was rescheduled for UFC on ESPN 36. He lost the bout via guillotine choke in the first round.

Cutelaba faced Johnny Walker on 10 September 2022, at UFC 279. He lost the fight by a rear-naked choke submission in the first round.

Cutelaba faced Kennedy Nzechukwu on 19 November 2022, at UFC Fight Night 215. He lost the fight via technical knockout in round two.

==== 2023 ====
Cutelaba faced Tanner Boser on 15 April 2023, at UFC on ESPN 44. He won the fight via first-round technical knockout.

Cutelaba was scheduled to face Ovince Saint Preux on 5 August 2023, at UFC on ESPN 50. However, the bout was cancelled on 20 July for unknown reasons.

Cutelaba was scheduled to face Philipe Lins on 7 October 2023 at UFC Fight Night 229. However the bout was cancelled the day of the event for unknown reasons.

==== 2024 ====
Cutelaba faced Philipe Lins on 9 March 2024, at UFC 299. He lost the fight by unanimous decision.

Cutelaba faced promotional newcomer Ivan Erslan on 28 September 2024 at UFC Fight Night 243. He won the fight by split decision.

==== 2025 ====
Cutelaba faced Ibo Aslan on 22 February 2025 at UFC Fight Night 252. He won the fight via an arm-triangle choke submission in the first round.

Cutelaba faced former Cage Warriors Light Heavyweight Champion Modestas Bukauskas on 10 May 2025 at UFC 315. He lost the fight by split decision.

==== 2026 ====
Cutelaba faced Oumar Sy on 14 March 2026 at UFC Fight Night 269. He won the fight via a guillotine choke submission in the first round.

Cutelaba faced Navajo Stirling on 20 June 2026 at UFC Fight Night 279. He lost the fight by technical knockout in the second round.

Cutelaba is scheduled to face Magomed Tuchalov on 5 December 2026 at UFC Fight Night 295.

== Personal life ==
Cutelaba and his wife Olga have two daughters.

== Championships and accomplishments ==
=== Mixed martial arts ===
- Ultimate Fighting Championship
  - Fight of the Night (One time) vs. Jared Cannonier
  - Fourth most takedowns in UFC Light Heavyweight division history (45)
  - Sixth most bouts in UFC Light Heavyweight division history (21)

=== Sambo ===
- European Combat Sambo Federation
  - 2012 European Combat Sambo Championships (gold) (90 kg)

== Mixed martial arts record ==
Professional record breakdown
34 matches	20 wins	12 losses
By knockout	13	4
By submission	4	4
By decision	3	3
By disqualification	0	1
Draws	1	
No contests	1	

Res.	Record	Opponent	Method	Event	Date	Round	Time	Location	Notes
Loss	20–12–1 (1)	Navajo Stirling	TKO (punches and elbows)	UFC Fight Night: Kape vs. Horiguchi	20 June 2026	2	3:23	Las Vegas, Nevada, United States	
Win	20–11–1 (1)	Oumar Sy	Submission (guillotine choke)	UFC Fight Night: Emmett vs. Vallejos	14 March 2026	1	4:24	Las Vegas, Nevada, United States	
Loss	19–11–1 (1)	Modestas Bukauskas	Decision (split)	UFC 315	10 May 2025	3	5:00	Montreal, Quebec, Canada	
Win	19–10–1 (1)	İbo Aslan	Submission (arm-triangle choke)	UFC Fight Night: Cejudo vs. Song	22 February 2025	1	2:51	Seattle, Washington, United States	
Win	18–10–1 (1)	Ivan Erslan	Decision (split)	UFC Fight Night: Moicano vs. Saint Denis	28 September 2024	3	5:00	Paris, France	
Loss	17–10–1 (1)	Philipe Lins	Decision (unanimous)	UFC 299	9 March 2024	3	5:00	Miami, Florida, United States	
Win	17–9–1 (1)	Tanner Boser	TKO (punches)	UFC on ESPN: Holloway vs. Allen	15 April 2023	1	2:05	Kansas City, Missouri, United States	
Loss	16–9–1 (1)	Kennedy Nzechukwu	TKO (flying knee and punches)	UFC Fight Night: Nzechukwu vs. Cuțelaba	19 November 2022	2	1:02	Las Vegas, Nevada, United States	
Loss	16–8–1 (1)	Johnny Walker	Submission (rear-naked choke)	UFC 279	10 September 2022	1	4:37	Las Vegas, Nevada, United States	
Loss	16–7–1 (1)	Ryan Spann	Submission (guillotine choke)	UFC on ESPN: Błachowicz vs. Rakić	14 May 2022	1	2:22	Las Vegas, Nevada, United States	
Win	16–6–1 (1)	Devin Clark	Decision (unanimous)	UFC Fight Night: Smith vs. Spann	18 September 2021	3	5:00	Las Vegas, Nevada, United States	
Draw	15–6–1 (1)	Dustin Jacoby	Draw (split)	UFC on ESPN: Reyes vs. Procházka	1 May 2021	3	5:00	Las Vegas, Nevada, United States	
Loss	15–6 (1)	Magomed Ankalaev	KO (punches)	UFC 254	24 October 2020	1	4:19	Abu Dhabi, United Arab Emirates	
Loss	15–5 (1)	Magomed Ankalaev	TKO (head kicks and punches)	UFC Fight Night: Benavidez vs. Figueiredo	29 February 2020	1	0:38	Norfolk, Virginia, United States	
Win	15–4 (1)	Khalil Rountree Jr.	TKO (elbows)	UFC Fight Night: Hermansson vs. Cannonier	28 September 2019	1	2:35	Copenhagen, Denmark	
Loss	14–4 (1)	Glover Teixeira	Submission (rear-naked choke)	UFC Fight Night: Jacaré vs. Hermansson	27 April 2019	2	3:37	Sunrise, Florida, United States	
Win	14–3 (1)	Gadzhimurad Antigulov	TKO (punches and elbows)	UFC on Fox: Alvarez vs. Poirier 2	28 July 2018	1	4:25	Calgary, Alberta, Canada	
Win	13–3 (1)	Henrique da Silva	KO (punches)	UFC Fight Night: Lewis vs. Hunt	11 June 2017	1	0:22	Auckland, New Zealand	
Loss	12–3 (1)	Jared Cannonier	Decision (unanimous)	The Ultimate Fighter: Tournament of Champions Finale	3 December 2016	3	5:00	Las Vegas, Nevada, United States	Fight of the Night.
Win	12–2 (1)	Jonathan Wilson	Decision (unanimous)	UFC Fight Night: Lineker vs. Dodson	1 October 2016	3	5:00	Portland, Oregon, United States	
Loss	11–2 (1)	Misha Cirkunov	Submission (arm-triangle choke)	UFC Fight Night: MacDonald vs. Thompson	18 June 2016	3	1:22	Ottawa, Ontario, Canada	Return to Light Heavyweight.
Win	11–1 (1)	Malik Merad	KO (punch)	World Warriors FC: Cage Encounter 4	19 September 2015	1	0:08	Paris, France	Catchweight (209 lb) bout.
Win	10–1 (1)	Vitali Ontishchenko	Submission (omoplata)	World Warriors FC: Cage Encounter 3	4 April 2015	1	2:37	Kyiv, Ukraine	
Win	9–1 (1)	Yuri Gorbenko	TKO (punches)	World Warriors FC: Ukraine Selection 5	28 February 2015	1	1:10	Kyiv, Ukraine	
Win	8–1 (1)	Izidor Bunea	TKO (punches)	World Warriors FC: Cage Encounter 2	13 December 2014	1	1:13	Chișinău, Moldova	
Win	7–1 (1)	Alexandru Stoica	KO (punch)	World Warriors FC: Cage Encounter 1	14 June 2014	1	0:07	Chișinău, Moldova	
Win	6–1 (1)	Constantin Padure	KO (punch)	Combat Sambo Federation of Moldova: Adrenaline	4 April 2014	1	1:05	Chișinău, Moldova	
Win	5–1 (1)	Igor Gorkun	KO (punch)	Grand European FC: Battle on the Gold Mountain	21 December 2013	1	0:28	Uzhhorod, Ukraine	
Loss	4–1 (1)	Michał Andryszak	DQ (punches to back of head)	Cage Warriors 58	24 August 2013	1	4:07	Grozny, Russia	
NC	4–0 (1)	Murod Hanturaev	NC (referee error)	Alash Pride: Grand Prix 2013	7 July 2013	1	0:24	Almaty, Kazakhstan	Originally a TKO (punches) win for Hanturaev; overturned due to a referee error.
Win	4–0	Anatoli Ciumac	TKO (punches)	European Combat Sambo Federation: Battle of Bessarabia	24 March 2013	2	0:29	Chișinău, Moldova	
Win	3–0	Igor Kukurudziak	Submission (omoplata)	European Combat Sambo Federation: Adrenaline	14 December 2012	1	0:42	Chișinău, Moldova	Heavyweight debut.
Win	2–0	Julian Chilikov	TKO (punches)	The Battle for Ruse	22 June 2012	1	0:25	Ruse, Bulgaria	
Win	1–0	Daglar Gasimov	TKO (punches)	CIS Pankration Cup 2012	5 April 2012	1	0:27	Nizhny Novgorod, Russia	Light Heavyweight debut.

== See also ==
- List of current UFC fighters
- List of male mixed martial artists
