= Benevides, Brazil =

Coordinates: 1°22′S 48°15′W

Benevides
- Municipality
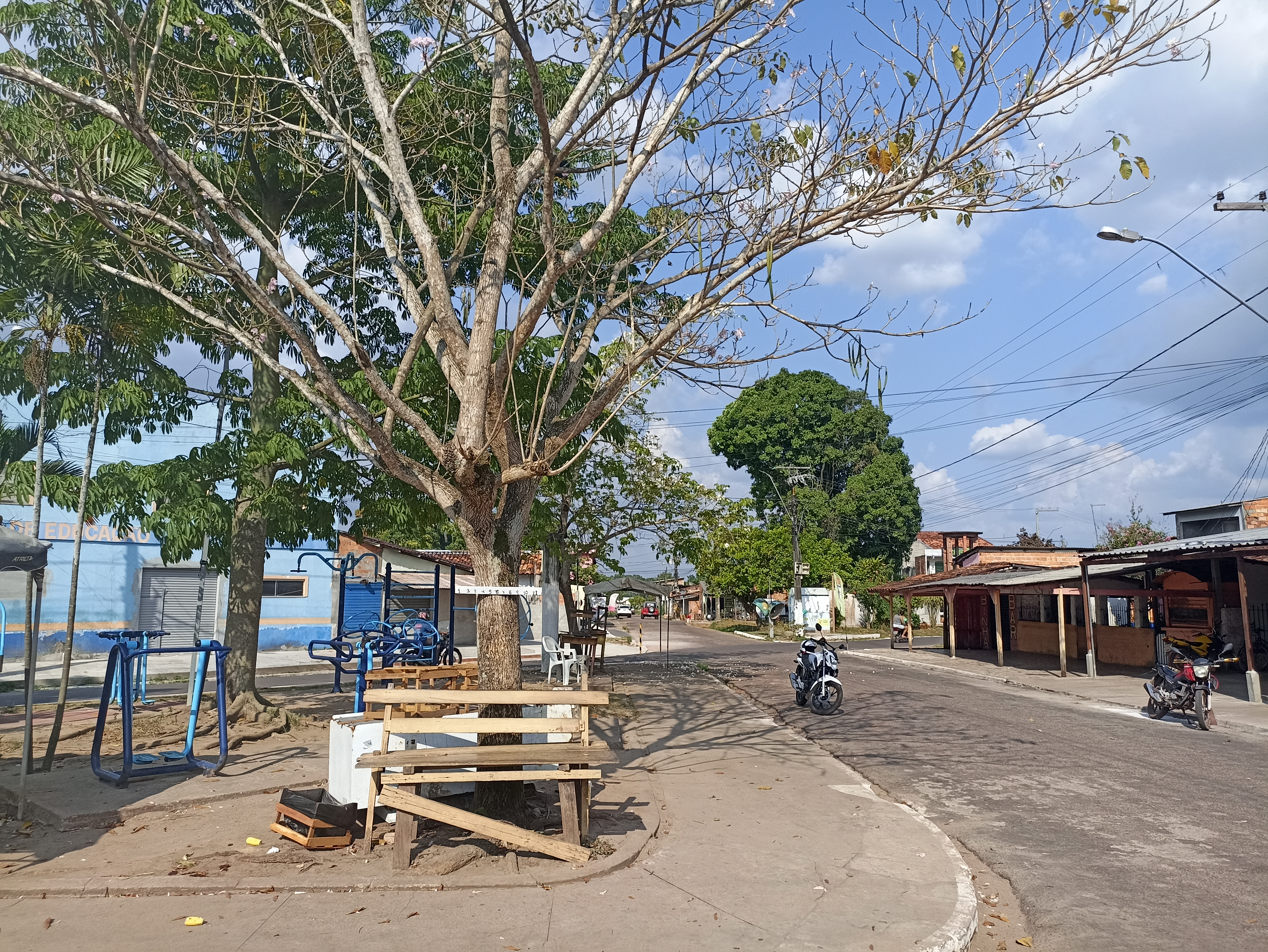

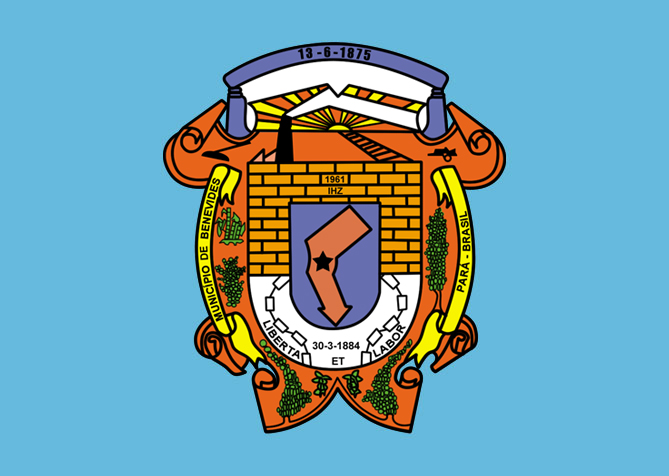
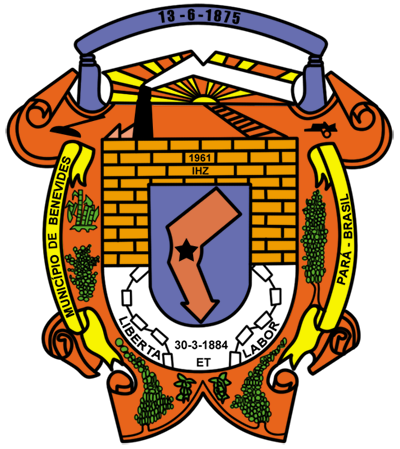
- Flag Coat of arms
- Interactive map of Benevides
- Country: Brazil
- Region: Northern
- State: Pará
- Mesoregion: Metropolitana de Belém

Population (2020)
  - Total: 63,768
- Time zone: UTC−3 (BRT)

Benevides is a municipality in the state of Pará in the Northern region of Brazil.

== See also ==
- List of municipalities in Pará
