= 2002 in Deep =

Mixed martial arts events

Information
- First date: March 30, 2002
- Last date: December 8, 2002

Events
- Total events: 6

Fights
- Total fights: 76

Chronology
2001 in Deep	2002 in Deep	2003 in Deep

The year 2002 was the second year in the history of Deep, a mixed martial arts promotion based in Japan. In 2002 Deep held 6 events beginning with, Deep: 4th Impact.

== Title fights ==
Title fights in 2002
Weight class				Method	Round	Time	Event	Notes
Middleweight	Ryuki Ueyama	def.	Eiji Ishikawa	Submission (Toe Hold)	2	0:48	Deep: 5th Impact	(Note: For the Deep Middleweight Championship.)

== Events list ==
#	Event title	Date	Arena	Location
9	Deep: 7th Impact	December 8, 2002	Differ Ariake	Tokyo
8	Deep: clubDeep Ozon	November 10, 2002	Club Ozon	Nagoya
7	Deep: 6th Impact	September 7, 2002	Ariake Coliseum	Tokyo
6	Deep: clubDeep Ozon	July 14, 2002	Club Ozon	Nagoya
5	Deep: 5th Impact	June 9, 2002	Differ Ariake	Tokyo
4	Deep: 4th Impact	March 30, 2002	Aichi Prefectural Gymnasium	Nagoya

== Deep: 4th Impact ==
Deep: 4th Impact was an event held on March 30, 2002 at the Aichi Prefectural Gymnasium in Nagoya, Japan.

=== Results ===
Main Card
Weight class				Method	Round	Time	Notes
	Kengo Watanabe	def.	Dos Caras, Jr.	Submission (Rear Naked Choke)	2	3:52
	Yuki Kondo	def.	Nestor Martinez	Submission (Armbar)	1	1:58
	Wataru Sakata	def.	Toro Irison	Submission (Armbar)	1	4:05
	Minoru Suzuki	def.	El Solar	DQ (Groin Strikes)	1	2:26
	Hirotaka Yokoi	def.	Memo Diaz	Decision (Unanimous)	3	5:00
	Joao Roque	def.	Takehiro Murahama	Submission (Armbar)	1	2:13
	Gustavo Machado	vs.	Yuki Sasaki	Draw	3	5:00
	Yasuhito Namekawa	def.	Daisuke Watanabe	Decision (Majority)	3	5:00
	Ryo Chonan	def.	Kenji Akiyama	TKO (Submission to punches)	1	4:22
	Mitsuhisa Sunabe	def.	Rambaa Somdet	Decision (Majority)	3	5:00
	Kyosuke Sasaki	def.	Tatsuharu Doi	Submission (Kimura)	1	2:51
	Ryogaku Wada	def.	Asteka Asteka	KO (Punches)	1	2:54
	Mario Sergio Yokoyama	def.	Hitoyo Kimura	TKO	1	5:00
	Tomomi Iwama	def.	Keichi Enami	KO (Punch)	1	1:07
	Tomoaki Nagai	def.	Tatsuya Kurahashi	Submission (Kimura)	1	3:44
	Yoshinari Asano	vs.	Naoki Kimura	Draw	1	5:00

== Deep: 5th Impact ==
Deep: 5th Impact was an event held on June 9, 2002 at the Differ Ariake in Tokyo, Japan.

=== Results ===
Main Card
Weight class				Method	Round	Time	Notes
	Ryuki Ueyama	def.	Eiji Ishikawa	Submission (Toe Hold)	2	0:48
	Makoto Miyazawa	def.	Ryogaku Wada	KO (Punch)	1	3:23
	Kosei Kubota	def.	Eiji Ishikawa	Decision (Unanimous)	2	5:00
	Darren Uyenoyama	def.	Rambaa Somdet	Decision (Unanimous)	3	5:00
	Ryuki Ueyama	def.	Takaharu Murahama	Submission (Rear Naked Choke)	3	1:44
	Takafumi Ito	def.	Ikuto Hidaka	Submission (Rear Naked Choke)	1	1:54
	Eiji Ishikawa	def.	Ryo Chonan	Decision (Majority)	2	5:00
	Kosei Kubota	def.	Yuji Hisamatsu	Decision (Unanimous)	2	5:00
	Ryuki Ueyama	def.	Seiki Ryo	Decision (Majority)	2	5:00
	Takaharu Murahama	def.	Yuji Hoshino	Technical Submission (Leg Scissor Choke)	2	1:23
	Masayuki Demise	vs.	Minoru Tsuiki	Draw	2	5:00
	Taku Aramaki	def.	Hirotaka Miyakawa	Submission (Armbar)	1	3:36

== Deep: clubDeep Ozon ==
Deep: clubDeep Ozon was an event held on July 14, 2002 at the Club Ozon in Nagoya, Japan.

=== Results ===
Main Card
Weight class				Method	Round	Time	Notes
	Tomoaki Nagai	def.	Hitoyo Kimura	TKO (Punches)	1	3:13
	Yoshinobu Ota	def.	Noriyuki Takeuchi	Submission (Guillotine Choke)	1	0:42
	Keita Inayoshi	def.	Riki Kanesada	Submission (Armbar)	1	1:31
	Masato Okawa	def.	Hiroki Noritsugi	TKO (Corner Stoppage)	1	1:50
	Toshihiko Ono	vs.	Mario Sergio Yokoyama	Draw	2	5:00
	Mitsuhiro Ito	def.	Shiro Takai	TKO (Punches)	2	1:21

== Deep: 6th Impact ==
Deep: 6th Impact was an event held on September 7, 2002 at the Ariake Coliseum in Tokyo, Japan. Going into his fight, Shoichi Ichimiya was the holder of the Ironman Heavymetalweight Championship, a comedic professional wrestling title promoted by Dramatic Dream Team (now DDT Pro-Wrestling) which is defended 24/7. As the result of his loss to Kazuki Okubo, Okubo was officially recognized as the champion by DDT.

=== Results ===
Main Card
Weight class				Method	Round	Time	Notes
	Kiyoshi Tamura	def.	Ikuhisa Minowa	Decision (Unanimous)	3	5:00
	Dokonjonosuke Mishima	def.	Takafumi Ito	Submission (Armbar)	1	0:53
	Antônio Rogério Nogueira	def.	Tsuyoshi Kosaka	Decision (Unanimous)	3	5:00
	Ryuki Ueyama	def.	Gilson Ferreira	Submission (Armbar)	3	3:49
	Fabio Mello	def.	Takumi Yano	Decision (Unanimous)	3	5:00
	Dos Caras, Jr.	def.	Tatsuaki Nakano	Submission (Rear-Naked Choke)	1	4:05
	Joao Roque	def.	Ryan Bow	Decision (Majority)	3	5:00
	Yasuhito Namekawa	def.	Makoto Miyazawa	Submission (Guillotine Choke)	3	2:37
	Ryo Chonan	def.	Katsumi Usuta	TKO (Flying Knee and Punches)	1	0:05
	Kazuki Okubo	def.	Shoichi Ichimiya	Submission (Armbar)	1	2:41
	Naoki Seki	vs.	Shunichi Akimoto	Draw	2	5:00
	Tomomi Iwama	def.	Shinobu Tsukikage	Submission (Armbar)	1	1:10

== Deep: clubDeep Ozon ==
Deep: clubDeep Ozon was an event held on November 10, 2002 at the Club Ozon in Nagoya, Japan.

=== Results ===
Main Card
Weight class				Method	Round	Time	Notes
	Takao Yamamoto	vs.	Hiroyuki Ito	Draw	2	5:00
	Toshihiko Ono	vs.	Naoki Kimura	Draw	2	5:00
	Mitsuhiro Ito	def.	Keita Inayoshi	TKO (Punches)	1	0:00
	Atsushi Uozumi	def.	Riki Kanesada	TKO (Corner Stoppage)	2	0:00
	Yasuhiro Konno	def.	Yukihiro Hioki	Submission (Kimura)	1	0:00
	Hiroki Isagi	def.	Kenji Takeshige	TKO (Punches)	2	0:00
	Tatsuya Kawano	def.	Ryuichi Kawai	Submission (Armbar)	2	0:00
	Shiro Takai	def.	Kochi Shimizu	TKO (Punches)	2	0:00

== Deep: 7th Impact ==
Deep: 7th Impact was an event held on December 8, 2002 at the Differ Ariake in Tokyo, Japan.

=== Results ===
Main Card
Weight class				Method	Round	Time	Notes
	Hirohide Fujinuma	def.	Dai Moriyama	TKO (Corner Stoppage)	1	2:22
	Tomoyuki Fukami	def.	Koichi Watanuki	TKO (Corner Stoppage)	1	4:50
	Dai Moriyama	def.	Daisuke Nakamura	Decision (Unanimous)	2	5:00
	Hirohide Fujinuma	def.	Ryo Tanaka	TKO (Punches)	1	1:52
	Daisuke Nakamura	def.	Hitoyo Kimura	Submission (Armbar)	2	0:50
	Yuki Kotake	def.	Hiroyuki Masuzawa	KO (Kick)	1	3:16
	Dai Moriyama	def.	Kei Ichikawa	Decision (Unanimous)	2	5:00
	Ryo Tanaka	def.	Kochi Shimizu	Decision (Unanimous)	2	5:00
	Masanori Suda	def.	Ryo Chonan	Decision (Split)	3	5:00
	Hirohide Fujinuma	def.	Jun Kito	TKO (Punches)	1	1:54
	Yasuhito Namekawa	def.	Yuki Ishikawa	TKO (Submission to punches)	1	3:46
	Tomoyuki Fukami	def.	Masayoshi Aida	Submission (Rear-Naked Choke)	1	2:08
	Takeshi Yamazaki	def.	Nalupon Tackhornthin	Submission (Armbar)	1	1:34
	Koichi Watanuki	def.	Yuki Kotake	Submission (Armbar)	1	2:08
	Rambaa Somdet	def.	Takeyasu Hirono	Decision (Unanimous)	3	5:00
	Tomoyuki Fukami	def.	Kazuto Kawagoe	TKO (Punches)	1	1:27
	Tomomi Iwama	def.	Tupperyar Crosspointgym	Submission (Armbar)	1	4:36
	Masayoshi Aida	def.	Tomoya Miyashita	TKO (Punches)	1	4:56
	Makoto Miyazawa	def.	Hiroyuki Ito	Decision (Unanimous)	3	5:00
	Asteka Asteka	vs.	Shoichi Ichimiya	Draw	3	5:00
	Koichi Watanuki	def.	Takashi Iga	Submission (Armbar)	2	3:11
	Manabu Hara	def.	Kaze Kaze	TKO (Punches)	1	2:40

== See also ==
- Deep
- List of Deep champions
- List of Deep events
