= List of Deep events =

This is a list of events held and scheduled by Deep (often stylized as DEEP), a mixed martial arts organization based in Japan.

The first event, Deep - 1st Impact, took place on January 8, 2001.

== Scheduled events ==
#	Event	Date	Venue	Location	Source
424	Deep Jewels 45	May 26, 2024	New Pier Hall	Minato, Tokyo, Japan	
423	Deep Tokyo Impact 2024 3rd Round	May 26, 2024	New Pier Hall	Minato, Tokyo, Japan	

== Events ==
#	Event title	Date	Arena	Location	Source
422	Deep 119 Impact	May 3, 2024	Korakuen Hall	Bunkyo, Tokyo, Japan	
421	Deep Tokyo Impact 2024 2nd Round	April 13, 2024	New Pier Hall	Minato, Tokyo, Japan	
420	Deep Nagoya Impact 2024: Kobudo Fight 2nd Round	April 7, 2024	Hotel Plaza Kachigawa	Kasugai, Aichi, Japan	
419	Deep Nagoya Impact 2024: Kobudo Fight 1st Round	April 7, 2024	Hotel Plaza Kachigawa	Kasugai, Aichi, Japan	
418	Deep Jewels 44	March 24, 2024	New Pier Hall	Minato, Tokyo, Japan	
417	Deep Tokyo Impact 2024 1st Round	March 24, 2024	New Pier Hall	Minato, Tokyo, Japan	
416	Deep Osaka Impact 2024 1st Round	March 17, 2023	Sumiyoshi Center	Sumiyoshi, Osaka, Japan	
415	Deep 118 Impact	March 9, 2024	Korakuen Hall	Bunkyo, Tokyo, Japan	
414	Deep 117 Impact	December 10, 2023	New Pier Hall	Minato, Tokyo, Japan	
413	Deep Tokyo Impact 2023 7th Round	December 10, 2023	New Pier Hall	Minato, Tokyo, Japan	
412	Deep Osaka Impact 2023 3rd Round	November 26, 2023	Sumiyoshi Center	Sumiyoshi, Osaka, Japan	
411	Deep Tokyo Impact 2023 6th Round	November 23, 2023	New Pier Hall	Minato, Tokyo, Japan	
410	Deep Jewels 43	November 23, 2023	New Pier Hall	Minato, Tokyo, Japan	
409	Deep 116 Impact	November 11, 2023	Korakuen Hall	Bunkyo, Tokyo, Japan	
408	Deep Hamamatsu Impact 2023	September 24, 2023	Actcity Hamamatsu	Hamamatsu, Shizuoka, Japan	
407	Deep 115 Impact: Deep Vs. Black Combat 2	September 18, 2023	Korakuen Hall	Bunkyo, Tokyo, Japan	
406	Deep Tokyo Impact 2023 5th Round	September 10, 2023	New Pier Hall	Minato, Tokyo, Japan	
405	Deep Jewels 42	September 10, 2023	New Pier Hall	Minato, Tokyo, Japan	
404	Deep Nagoya Impact: Kobudo Fight 4th Round	August 6, 2023	Hotel Plaza Kachigawa	Kasugai, Aichi, Japan	
403	Deep Nagoya Impact: Kobudo Fight 3rd Round	August 6, 2023	Hotel Plaza Kachigawa	Kasugai, Aichi, Japan	
402	Deep Osaka Impact 2023 2nd Round	July 30, 2023	Sumiyoshi Center	Sumiyoshi, Osaka, Japan	
401	Deep Vs. Nariagari	July 23, 2023	New Pier Hall	Minato, Tokyo, Japan	
400	Deep 114 Impact	July 2, 2023	Korakuen Hall	Bunkyo, Tokyo, Japan	
399	Deep Jewels 41	May 28, 2023	New Pier Hall	Minato, Tokyo, Japan	
398	Deep Tokyo Impact 2023 4th Round	May 27, 2023	New Pier Hall	Minato, Tokyo, Japan	
397	Deep 113 Impact	May 7, 2023	Korakuen Hall	Bunkyo, Tokyo, Japan	
396	Deep Tokyo Impact 2023 3rd Round	May 6, 2023	Korakuen Hall	Bunkyo, Tokyo, Japan	
395	Deep Nagoya Impact: Kobudo Fight 2nd Round	April 16, 2023	Aioi Hall	Kariya, Aichi, Japan	
394	Deep Nagoya Impact: Kobudo Fight 1st Round	April 15, 2023	Aioi Hall	Kariya, Aichi, Japan	
393	Deep Osaka Impact 2023 1st Round	April 2, 2023	Sumiyoshi Center	Sumiyoshi, Osaka, Japan	
392	Deep Tokyo Impact 2023 2nd Round	March 25, 2023	New Pier Hall	Minato, Tokyo, Japan	
391	Deep Tokyo Impact 2023 1st Round	March 24, 2023	New Pier Hall	Minato, Tokyo, Japan	
390	Deep Jewels 40	February 18, 2023	Shinjuku FACE	Shinjuku, Tokyo, Japan	
389	Deep 112 Impact	February 11, 2023	Korakuen Hall	Bunkyo, Tokyo, Japan	
388	Deep Osaka Impact 2022 5th Round	December 18, 2022	Colega Studio	Fukushima, Osaka, Japan	
387	Deep Osaka Impact 2022 4th Round	December 17, 2022	Colega Studio	Fukushima, Osaka, Japan	
386	Deep 111 Impact	December 11, 2022	New Pier Hall	Minato, Tokyo, Japan	
385	Deep Tokyo Impact 2022 7th Round	December 10, 2022	New Pier Hall	Minato, Tokyo, Japan	
384	Deep Tokyo Impact 2022 6th Round	November 23, 2022	New Pier Hall	Minato, Tokyo, Japan	
383	Deep Jewels 39	November 22, 2022	New Pier Hall	Minato, Tokyo, Japan	
382	Deep Nagoya Impact 2022: Kobudo Fight	November 20, 2022	Hotel Plaza Kachigawa	Kasugai, Aichi, Japan	
381	Deep 110 Impact	November 12, 2022	Korakuen Hall	Bunkyo, Tokyo, Japan	
380	Deep Okinawa Impact	October 30, 2022	Music Town Otoichiba	Okinawa, Japan	
379	Deep Hamamatsu Impact 2022	September 25, 2022	Actcity Hamamatsu	Hamamatsu, Shizuoka, Japan	
378	Deep Tokyo Impact 2022 5th Impact	September 11, 2022	New Pier Hall	Minato, Tokyo, Japan	
377	Deep Jewels 38	September 10, 2022	New Pier Hall	Minato, Tokyo, Japan	
376	Deep Osaka Impact 2022 3rd Round	August 28, 2022	Colega Studio	Fukushima, Osaka, Japan	
375	Deep Osaka Impact 2022 2nd Round	August 27, 2022	Colega Studio	Fukushima, Osaka, Japan	
374	Deep 109 Impact	August 21, 2022	Korakuen Hall	Bunkyo, Tokyo, Japan	
373	Deep 108 Impact	July 10, 2022	Tokyo Dome City Hall	Bunkyo, Tokyo, Japan	
372	Deep Tokyo Impact 2022 4th Round	May 29, 2022	Shinjuku, FACE	Shinjuku, Tokyo, Japan	
371	Deep Tokyo Impact 2022 3rd Round	May 28, 2022	Shinjuku, FACE	Shinjuku, Tokyo, Japan	
370	Deep 107 Impact	May 8, 2022	Korakuen Hall	Bunkyo, Tokyo, Japan	
369	Deep Jewels 37	May 7, 2022	Korakuen Hall	Bunkyo, Tokyo, Japan	
368	Deep Cage Impact in Osaka 2022	April 9, 2022	Umeda Stella Hall	Osaka, Japan	
367	Deep Tokyo Impact 2022 2nd Round	March 13, 2022	New Pier Hall	Minato, Tokyo, Japan	
366	Deep Jewels 36	March 12, 2022	New Pier Hall	Minato, Tokyo, Japan	
365	Deep Tokyo Impact 2022 1st Round	March 11, 2022	New Pier Hall	Minato, Tokyo, Japan	
364	Deep Nagoya Impact: Kobudo Fight	March 6, 2022	Hotel Praza Kachigawa	Kasugai, Aichi, Japan	
363	Deep 106 Impact	February 26, 2022	Korakuen Hall	Bunkyo, Tokyo, Japan	
362	Deep 105 Impact	December 12, 2021	New Pier Hall	Minato, Tokyo, Japan	
361	Deep Tokyo Impact 2021	December 11, 2021	New Pier Hall	Minato, Tokyo, Japan	
360	Deep Jewels 35	December 11, 2021	New Pier Hall	Minato, Tokyo, Japan	
359	Deep Osaka Impact 2021	November 20, 2021	Colega Studio	Fukushima, Osaka, Japan	
358	Deep 104 Impact	October 24, 2021	korakuen Hall	Bunkyo, Tokyo, Japan	
357	Deep Tokyo Impact 2021- Second Round	October 17, 2021	Shinjuku, FACE	Shinjuku, Tokyo, Japan	
356	Deep Tokyo Impact 2021- First Round	October 16, 2021	Shinjuku, FACE	Shinjuku, Tokyo, Japan	
355	Deep 103 Impact	September 23, 2021	Korakuen Hall	Bunkyo, Tokyo, Japan	
354	Deep Hamamatsu Impact 2021	September 19, 2021	Actcity Hamamatsu	Hamamatsu, Shizuoka, Japan	
353	Deep Jewels 34	September 4, 2021	Shinjuku, FACE	Shinjuku, Tokyo, Japan	
352	Deep Osaka Impact 2021	July 18, 2021	Colega Studio	Fukushima, Osaka, Japan	
351	Deep 102 Impact	July 4, 2021	Korakuen Hall	Bunkyo, Tokyo, Japan	
350	Deep 101 Impact	June 20, 2021	New Pier Hall	Minato, Tokyo, Japan	
349	Deep Jewels 33	June 19, 2021	New Pier Hall	Minato, Tokyo, Japan	
348	Deep Tokyo Impact 2021 - 2nd Round	June 19, 2021	New Pier Hall	Minato, Tokyo, Japan	
347	Deep Tokyo Impact 2021 - 1st Round	June 18, 2021	New Pier Hall	Minato, Tokyo, Japan	
346	Deep Osaka Impact 2021	April 4, 2021	Colega Studio	Fukushima, Osaka, Japan	
345	Deep Tokyo Impact 2021	March 13, 2021	Shinjuku, FACE	Shinjuku, Tokyo, Japan	
344	Deep Future King Tournament 2020	March 12, 2021	Shinjuku, FACE	Shinjuku, Tokyo, Japan	
343	Deep Jewels 32	March 7, 2021	Korakuen Hall	Bunkyo, Tokyo, Japan	
342	Deep 100 Impact - 20th Anniversary	February 21, 2021	TDC Hall	Bunkyo, Tokyo, Japan	
341	Deep Jewels 31	December 19, 2020	Shinjuku, FACE	Shinjuku, Tokyo, Japan	
340	Deep Tokyo Impact 2020	December 18, 2020	Shinjuku, FACE	Shinjuku, Tokyo, Japan	
339	Deep 99 Impact	November 1, 2020	New Pier Hall	Minato, Tokyo, Japan	
338	Deep 98 Impact	October 31, 2020	New Pier Hall	Minato, Tokyo, Japan	
337	Deep Jewels 30	October 31, 2020	New Pier Hall	Minato, Tokyo, Japan	
336	Deep Hamamatsu Impact 2020	October 25, 2020	Act City Hamamatsu	Hamamatsu, Shizuoka, Japan	
335	Deep 97 Impact	September 20, 2020	Korakuen Hall	Bunkyo, Tokyo, Japan	
334	Deep 96 Impact	August 23, 2020	New Pier Hall	Minato, Tokyo, Japan	
333	Deep 95 Impact	August 22, 2020	New Pier Hall	Minato, Tokyo, Japan	
332	Deep Osaka Impact 2020	August 9, 2020	Sumiyoshi Kumin Center	Sumiyoshi, Osaka, Japan	
331	Deep Jewels 29	July 23, 2020	Shinjuku FACE	Shinjuku, Tokyo, Japan	
330	Deep 94 Impact	March 1, 2020	Korakuen Hall	Bunkyo, Tokyo, Japan	
329	Deep Jewels 28	February 24, 2020	New Pier Hall	Minato, Tokyo, Japan	
328	Deep Jewels 27	December 22, 2019	Abeno Activity Center	Osaka, Japan	
327	Deep 93 Impact	December 15, 2019	Ota Ward Gymnasium	Ota, Tokyo, Japan	
326	Deep Nagoya Impact 2019: Kobudo Fight	November 14, 2019	Hotel Plaza Kachigawa	Kasugai, Aichi, Japan	
325	Deep 92 Impact	October 22, 2019	Korakuen Hall	Bunkyo, Tokyo, Japan	
324	Deep Jewels 26	October 21, 2019	Korakuen Hall	Bunkyo, Tokyo, Japan	
323	Deep Hamamatsu Impact 2019	September 15, 2019	Act City Hamamatsu	Hamamatsu, Shizuoka, Japan	
322	Deep 91 Impact	September 8, 2019	New Pier Hall	Minato, Tokyo, Japan	
321	Deep Jewels 25	September 1, 2019	Shinjuku FACE	Shinjuku, Tokyo, Japan	
320	Deep Tokyo Impact 2019	August 31, 2019	Shinjuku FACE	Shinjuku, Tokyo, Japan	
319	Deep 90 Impact	June 29, 2019	Korakuen Hall	Bunkyo, Tokyo, Japan	
318	Deep Jewels 24	June 9, 2019	Shinjuku FACE	Shinjuku, Tokyo, Japan	
317	Deep 89 Impact	May 12, 2019	New Pier Hall	Minato, Tokyo, Japan	
316	Deep Cage Impact in Osaka 2019	April 28, 2019	Asahikumin Center	Osaka, Japan	
315	Deep Tokyo Impact 2019: Deep Future King Tournament	March 16, 2019	Shinjuku FACE	Shinjuku, Tokyo, Japan	
314	Deep 88 Impact	March 9, 2019	Korakuen Hall	Bunkyo, Tokyo, Japan	
313	Deep Jewels 23	March 8, 2019	Shinjuku FACE	Shinjuku, Tokyo, Japan	
312	Deep 87 Impact	December 22, 2018	Korakuen Hall	Bunkyo, Tokyo, Japan	
311	Deep Jewels 22	December 1, 2018	Shinjuku FACE	Shinjuku, Tokyo, Japan	
310	Deep 86 Impact	October 27, 2018	Ota Ward Gymnasium	Ota, Tokyo, Japan	
309	Deep Cage Impact in Osaka 2018	October 8, 2018	KADO-YA Hall	Osaka, Japan	
308	Deep Jewels 21	September 16, 2018	Shinjuku FACE	Shinjuku, Tokyo, Japan	
307	Deep 85 Impact	August 26, 2018	Korakuen Hall	Bunkyo, Tokyo, Japan	
306	Deep 84 Impact - Differ Ariake Final	June 30, 2018	Differ Ariake	Tokyo, Japan	
305	Deep Jewels 20	June 9, 2018	Shinjuku FACE	Shinjuku, Tokyo, Japan	
304	Deep Nagoya Impact Kobudo Fight 2018	May 20, 2018	Hotel Plaza Katsukawa	Kasugai, Aichi, Japan	
303	Deep 83 Impact	April 28, 2018	Korakuen Hall	Bunkyo, Tokyo, Japan	
302	Cage Impact in Osaka 2018	April 8, 2018	KADO-YA Hall	Osaka, Japan	
301	Deep Hachioji Chojin Matsuri 2018	April 1, 2018	Hachioji Fujimori Gymnasium	Hachioji, Japan	
300	Deep Jewels 19	March 10, 2018	Shinjuku FACE	Shinjuku, Tokyo, Japan	
299	Deep Saitama Impact: in Koedo Kawagoe 2018	March 4, 2018	Espoir Isanuma	Kawagoe, Japan	
298	Deep 82 Impact	February 24, 2018	Differ Ariake	Tokyo, Japan	
297	Pancrase vs. Deep	December 24, 2017	Amashin Archaic Hall	Amagasaki, Hyogo, Japan	
296	Deep 81 Impact	December 23, 2017	Differ Ariake	Tokyo, Japan	
295	Deep Jewels 18	December 2, 2017	Shinjuku FACE	Shinjuku, Tokyo, Japan	
294	Deep 80 Impact	October 21, 2017	Differ Ariake	Tokyo, Japan	
293	Deep 79 Impact	September 16, 2017	Ota Ward Gymnasium	Tokyo, Japan	
292	Deep Jewels 17	August 26, 2017	Shinjuku FACE	Shinjuku, Tokyo, Japan	
291	Deep Nagoya Impact: Kobudo Fight	July 16, 2017	Hotel Plaza Kachigawa	Kasugai, Aichi, Japan	
290	Deep Cage Impact 2017: At Korakuen Hall	July 15, 2017	Korakuen Hall	Bunkyo, Tokyo, Japan	
289	Deep Jewels 16	May 20, 2017	Shinjuku FACE	Shinjuku, Tokyo, Japan	
288	Deep Cage Impact 2017	May 13, 2017	Differ Ariake	Tokyo, Japan	
287	Deep Nagoya Impact: Kobudo Fight 2017	April 9, 2017	Hotel Plaza Katsukawa	Nagoya, Aichi, Japan	
286	Deep Hachioji Chojin Matsuri 2017	April 2, 2017	Hachioji Municipal Gymnasium	Hachioji, Tokyo, Japan	
285	Deep Saitama Impact in Koedo Kawagoe 2017	March 26, 2017	Espoir Isanuma	Kawagoe, Saitama, Japan	
284	Deep Osaka Impact	March 20, 2017	Sumiyoshi Ward Community Center	Osaka, Japan	
283	Deep - 78 Impact	March 18, 2017	Korakuen Hall	Bunkyo, Tokyo, Japan	
282	Deep Jewels 15	February 25, 2017	Shinjuku FACE	Shinjuku, Tokyo, Japan	
281	Deep Future Kings Tournament 2017	February 12, 2017	GEN Sports Palace	Tokyo, Japan	
280	Deep Osaka Impact 2017: Penetrator Challenge	January 22, 2017	Smuyoshi Kumin Center	Osaka, Japan	
279	Deep Cage Impact 2016: DEEP vs. WSOF-GC	December 17, 2016	Differ Ariake	Tokyo, Japan	
278	Deep Numazu: Fujisan Matsuri	November 27, 2016	Plaza Verde	Numazu, Shizuoka, Japan	
277	Deep Hitachinaka: Yasuhiro Kawasaki Retirement	November 19, 2016	Nakaminato Gymnasium	Hitachinaka, Ibaraki, Japan	
276	Deep Jewels 14	November 2, 2016	Shinjuku FACE	Shinjuku, Tokyo, Japan	
275	Deep Cage Impact 2016: Korakuen Hall	October 18, 2016	Korakuen Hall	Bunkyo, Tokyo, Japan	
274	Deep - Cage Impact 2016 in Osaka	October 9, 2016	Sumiyoshi Ward Community Center	Osaka, Japan	
273	Deep Nagoya Impact: Kobudo Fight	October 2, 2016	Hotel Plaza Katsukawa	Nagoya, Aichi, Japan	
272	Deep Hamamatsu Impact 2016	September 18, 2016	Act Tower	Hamamatsu, Shizuoka, Japan	
271	Deep - 77 Impact / Deep Jewels 13	August 27, 2016	Differ Ariake	Tokyo, Japan	
270	Deep - Saitama Impact in Koedo Kawagoe 2016	July 3, 2016	Espoir Isanuma	Kawagoe, Saitama, Japan	
269	Deep - 76 Impact: Strawweight GP 2016 Opening Round	June 26, 2016	Korakuen Hall	Bunkyo, Tokyo, Japan	
268	Deep Nagoya Impact: Kobudo Fight	June 12, 2016	Hotel Plaza Katsukawa	Nagoya, Aichi, Japan	
267	Deep Jewels 12	June 5, 2016	Differ Ariake	Tokyo, Japan	
266	Deep Tokyo Impact Wave 9	May 14, 2016	Shinjuku FACE	Shinjuku, Tokyo, Japan	
265	Deep Cage Impact 2016	April 23, 2016	Differ Ariake	Tokyo, Japan	
264	Deep Hachioji Chojin Matsuri 2016	April 3, 2016	Hachioji Municipal Gymnasium	Hachioji, Tokyo, Japan	
263	Deep Amami Oshima	March 27, 2016	Amami Experience Exchange Center	Amami Oshima, Kagoshima, Japan	
262	Deep Nagoya Impact: Kobudo Fight	March 27, 2016	Plaza Katsukawa Hotel	Nagoya, Aichi, Japan	
261	Deep Osaka Impact 2015	March 21, 2016	Osaka Higashi Sumiyoshi Exchange Center	Osaka, Japan	
260	Deep - Jewels 11	March 5, 2016	Shinjuku Face	Shinjuku, Tokyo, Japan	
259	Deep - 75 Impact	February 27, 2016	Korakuen Hall	Bunkyo, Tokyo, Japan	
258	Deep - Future King Tournament 2015	December 20, 2015	Differ Ariake	Tokyo, Japan	
257	Deep - 74 Impact	December 20, 2015	Differ Ariake	Tokyo, Japan	
256	Deep - Jewels 10	November 23, 2015	Shinjuku Face	Shinjuku, Tokyo, Japan	
255	Deep - 73 Impact	October 17, 2015	Korakuen Hall	Bunkyo, Tokyo, Japan	
254	Deep - Cage Impact 2015 in Osaka	October 11, 2015	Abeno-Kumin Center Hall	Osaka, Japan	
253	Deep - Nagoya Impact 2015	September 27, 2015	Hotel Plaza Kachigawa	Kasugai, Japan	
252	Deep - Hamamatsu Impact 2015	September 6, 2015	Act City Hamamatsu	Hamamatsu, Japan	
251	Deep - Jewels 9	August 29, 2015	Differ Ariake	Tokyo, Japan	
250	Deep - Cage Impact 2015	August 29, 2015	Differ Ariake	Tokyo, Japan	
249	Deep - Cage Impact 2015	July 20, 2015	Ota Gymnasium	Ota, Tokyo, Japan	
248	Deep - Toyama Impact 2015	July 5, 2015	Toyama Event Plaza	Toyama, Japan	
247	Deep - Oyaji Impact 2015	June 7, 2015	Katsukawa Hotel Plaza	Aichi, Japan	
246	Deep - Nagoya Impact 2015: Kobudo Fight	June 7, 2015	Katsukawa Hotel Plaza	Aichi, Japan	
245	Deep - Jewels 8	May 31, 2015	Shinjuku Face	Shinjuku, Tokyo, Japan	
244	Deep - Tokyo Impact Wave 8	May 31, 2015	Shinjuku Face	Shinjuku, Tokyo, Japan	
243	Deep - Fuji Matsuri	May 24, 2015	Kiramesse Numazu	Numazu, Shizuoka, Japan	
242	Deep - 72 Impact	May 16, 2015	Korakuen Hall	Bunkyo, Tokyo, Japan	
241	DEEP: Funabashi Bom-Ba-Ye	May 8, 2015	Funabashi Auto Racetrack	Funabashi, Chiba, Japan	
240	Deep - Osaka Impact 2015	April 29, 2015	Abeno-Kumin Center Hall	Osaka, Japan	
239	Deep - Deep Hachioji Chojin Matsuri	April 5, 2015	Esforta Arena	Tokyo, Japan	
238	Deep - Nagoya Impact: Kobudo Fight	March 8, 2015	Hotel Plaza Kachigawa	Aichi, Japan	
237	Deep - Amateur Deep 25	March 1, 2015	Kobudo Martial Arts Communication Space Tiger Hall	Aichi, Japan	
236	Deep - 71 Impact	February 28, 2015	Korakuen Hall	Bunkyo, Tokyo, Japan	
235	Deep - Jewels 7	February 21, 2015	Shinjuku Face	Shinjuku, Tokyo, Japan	
234	Deep - Future King Tournament 2014	February 1, 2015	Golds Gym South Tokyo Annex	Tokyo, Japan	
233	Deep - Dream Impact 2014: Omisoka Special	December 31, 2014	Saitama Super Arena	Saitama, Japan	
232	Deep - 70 Impact	December 21, 2014	Differ Ariake	Tokyo, Japan	
231	Deep - Toyama Impact 2014: Rookies 4	November 16, 2014	Toyama Event Plaza	Toyama, Japan	
230	Deep - Jewels 6	November 3, 2014	Shinjuku Face	Shinjuku, Tokyo, Japan	
229	Deep - 69 Impact	October 26, 2014	Tokyo Dome City Hall	Tokyo, Japan	
228	Deep - Cage Impact 2014 in Osaka	October 19, 2014	Abeno Kumin Center Hall	Osaka, Japan	
227	Deep: Hamamatsu Impact 2014	September 14, 2014	Okura Act City Hotel Hamamatsu	Hamamatsu, Shizuoka, Japan	
226	Deep: Kanazawa Impact 2014	September 7, 2014	country Kanazawa	Ishikawa, Japan	
225	Deep: 68 Impact	August 23, 2014	Korakuen Hall	Bunkyo, Tokyo, Japan	
224	Deep: Jewels 5	August 9, 2014	Shinjuku Face	Tokyo, Japan	
223	Deep: Nagoya Impact 2014: Kobudo Fight	July 27, 2014	Nagoya Congress Center Event Hall	Nagoya, Aichi, Japan	
222	Deep: Cage Impact 2014	July 21, 2014	Ota City General Gymnasium	Ota, Tokyo, Japan	
221	Deep: 67 Impact	June 22, 2014	Korakuen Hall	Bunkyo, Tokyo, Japan	
220	Deep: Fujisan Festival	May 25, 2014	Fujisan Messe	Fuji, Shizuoka, Japan	
219	Deep: Jewels 4	May 18, 2014	Shinjuku Face	Shinjuku, Tokyo, Japan	
218	Deep: 66 Impact	April 29, 2014	Differ Ariake	Tokyo, Japan	
217	Deep: Toyama Impact 12	April 20, 2014	Toyama Event Plaza	Toyama, Japan	
216	Deep: 65 Impact	March 22, 2014	Differ Ariake	Tokyo, Japan	
215	Deep: Deep Hachioji Chojin Matsuri	March 1, 2014	Hachiojians Gymnasium	Tokyo, Japan	
214	Deep: Osaka Impact 2014	February 23, 2014	Abeno-kumin Center Hall	Osaka, Japan	
213	Deep: Jewels 3	February 16, 2014	Shinjuku Face	Shinjuku, Tokyo, Japan	
212	Deep: Tokyo Impact: Wave 7	February 16, 2014	Shinjuku Face	Shinjuku, Tokyo, Japan	
211	Deep: Nagoya Impact 2014	February 9, 2014	Hotel Plaza Kachigawa	Kasugai, Aichi, Japan	
210	Deep: 64 Impact	December 22, 2013	Differ Ariake	Tokyo	
209	Deep: Cage Impact 2013	November 24, 2013	Tokyo Dome City Hall	Tokyo	
208	Deep: Toyama Impact: Rookies 3	November 17, 2013	Toyama Event Plaza	Toyama	
207	Deep - Jewels 2	November 4, 2013	Shinjuku Face	Shinjuku, Tokyo, Japan	
206	Deep: Tribe Tokyo Fight	October 20, 2013	Korakuen Hall	Bunkyo, Tokyo, Japan	
205	Deep: Tokyo Impact: Wave 6	October 14, 2013	Shinjuku Face	Shinjuku, Tokyo, Japan	
204	Deep: Osaka Impact 2013	October 13, 2013	Azalea Taisho Hall	Osaka	
203	Deep - Jewels 1	August 31, 2013	Shinjuku Face	Shinjuku, Tokyo, Japan	
202	Deep: 63 Impact	August 25, 2013	Korakuen Hall	Bunkyo, Tokyo, Japan	
201	Deep: Nagoya Impact: Kobudo	August 10, 2013	Nagoya Congress Center	Nagoya, Aichi	
200	Deep: Tokyo Impact Lightweight GP	July 20, 2013	Shinjuku Face	Shinjuku, Tokyo, Japan	
199	Deep: Cage Impact 2013	June 15, 2013	Korakuen Hall	Bunkyo, Tokyo, Japan	
198	Deep: Tokyo Impact: Wave 5	May 18, 2013	Shinjuku Face	Shinjuku, Tokyo, Japan	
197	Deep: Nagoya Impact: Kobudo Fight	May 5, 2013	Hotel Plaza Kachigawa	Kasugai	
196	Deep: Osaka Impact 2013	April 28, 2013	Matsushita IMP Hall	Osaka	
195	Deep: 62 Impact	April 26, 2013	Tokyo Dome City Hall	Tokyo	
194	Deep: Toyama Impact 11	April 14, 2013	Toyama Event Plaza	Toyama	
193	Deep: Tokyo Impact: Lightweight GP 2013 Opening Round	March 10, 2013	Shinjuku Face	Shinjuku, Tokyo, Japan	
192	Deep: 61 Impact	February 16, 2013	Korakuen Hall	Bunkyo, Tokyo, Japan	
191	Deep: Future King Tournament 2012	January 26, 2013	Shinkiba 1st Ring	Tokyo	
190	Deep: Rookies and Oyaji Deep in Kasugai	December 23, 2012	Kasugai City Gymnasium 2nd Stadium	Kasugai	
189	Deep: Haleo Impact	December 22, 2012	Korakuen Hall	Bunkyo, Tokyo, Japan	
188	Deep: Cage Impact 2012 in Tokyo: 2nd Round	December 8, 2012	Differ Ariake	Tokyo	
187	Deep: Cage Impact 2012 in Tokyo: 1st Round	December 8, 2012	Differ Ariake	Tokyo	
186	Deep: Toyama Impact 2012	November 11, 2012	Toyama Event Plaza	Toyama	
185	Deep: 60 Impact	October 19, 2012	Korakuen Hall	Bunkyo, Tokyo, Japan	
184	Deep: Tokyo Impact: Wave 4	September 30, 2012	Shinjuku Face	Shinjuku, Tokyo, Japan	
183	Deep: Osaka Impact 2012	September 29, 2012	Abeno-kumin Center Hall	Osaka	
182	Deep: Cage Impact 2012 in Hamamatsu	September 16, 2012	Act City	Hamamatsu	
181	Deep: 59 Impact	August 18, 2012	Korakuen Hall	Bunkyo, Tokyo, Japan	
180	Deep: Nagoya Impact 2012: Kobudo Fight	July 22, 2012	Zepp Nagoya	Nagoya	
179	Deep: Tokyo Impact 2012 in Differ Ariake	July 21, 2012	Differ Ariake	Tokyo	
178	Deep: clubDeep Toyama: Barbarian Festival 10	June 24, 2012	Toyama Event Plaza	Toyama	
177	Deep: 58 Impact	June 15, 2012	Korakuen Hall	Bunkyo, Tokyo, Japan	
176	Deep: Osaka Impact	May 26, 2012	Azalea Taisho Hall	Osaka	
175	Deep: Tokyo Impact 3	April 29, 2012	Shinjuku Face	Shinjuku, Tokyo, Japan	
174	Deep: Cage Impact 2012 in Tokyo: Over Again	April 7, 2012	Differ Ariake	Tokyo	
173	Deep: Nagoya Impact: Kobudo Fight	March 25, 2012	Asunal Kanayama Hall	Nagoya	
172	Deep / Smash: Japan MMA League 2011 Finals	March 3, 2012	Shin-Kiba 1st Ring	Tokyo	
171	Deep: Amateur Deep	March 3, 2012	Shin-Kiba 1st Ring	Tokyo	
170	Deep: 57 Impact	February 18, 2012	Tokyo Dome City Hall	Tokyo	
169	Deep: Shizuoka Impact 2012	February 5, 2012	Twin Messe	Shizuoka	
168	Deep: Fujisan Festival	January 29, 2012	Fujisan Messe	Fuji	
167	Deep: Oyaji Deep	December 18, 2011	Asunal Kanayama Hall	Nagoya	
166	Deep / Smash: Japan MMA League 2011 Semifinals	December 17, 2011	Shinjuku Face	Shinjuku, Tokyo, Japan	
165	Deep: 56 Impact	December 16, 2011	Korakuen Hall	Bunkyo, Tokyo, Japan	
164	Deep: Future King Tournament 2011	December 10, 2011	Shinkiba 1st Ring	Tokyo	
163	Deep: Cage Impact 2011 in Toyama	November 27, 2011	Toyama Event Plaza	Toyama	
162	Deep: Cage Impact 2011 in Tokyo, 2nd Round	October 29, 2011	Differ Ariake	Tokyo	
161	Deep: Cage Impact 2011 in Tokyo, 1st Round	October 29, 2011	Differ Ariake	Tokyo	
160	Deep: clubDeep Nagoya: Kobudo Fight 3	October 9, 2011	Asunal Kanayama Hall	Nagoya	
159	Deep / Smash: Japan MMA League 2011 vol. 6	October 8, 2011	Shinkiba 1st Ring	Tokyo	
158	Deep: Cage Impact 2011 in Hamamatsu	September 18, 2011	Act City	Hamamatsu	
157	Deep: Osaka Impact	September 4, 2011	Matsushita IMP Hall	Osaka	
156	Deep / Smash: Japan MMA League 2011 vol. 5	September 3, 2011	Shinkiba 1st Ring	Tokyo	
155	Deep: 55 Impact	August 26, 2011	Korakuen Hall	Bunkyo, Tokyo, Japan	
154	Deep: clubDeep in Diana 2	August 21, 2011	Club Diana	Tokyo	
153	Deep / Smash: Japan MMA League 2011 vol. 4	August 20, 2011	Shinkiba 1st Ring	Tokyo	
152	Deep: Beach Fight: Mach Festival	August 13, 2011	N/A	Ichinomiya	
151	Deep: clubDeep Toyama: Rookies and Oyaji Deep	August 7, 2011	Toyama Event Plaza	Toyama	
150	Deep: Cage Impact 2011 in Nagoya	July 10, 2011	Zepp Nagoya	Nagoya	
149	Deep / Smash: Japan MMA League 2011 vol. 3	July 2, 2011	Shinkiba 1st Ring	Tokyo	
148	Deep: 54 Impact	June 24, 2011	Korakuen Hall	Bunkyo, Tokyo, Japan	
147	Deep / Smash: Japan MMA League 2011 vol. 2	June 18, 2011	Shinkiba 1st Ring	Tokyo	
146	Deep: Tokyo Impact 2	June 5, 2011	Shinjuku Face	Shinjuku, Tokyo, Japan	
145	Deep: Kobudo Fight Future Challenge 10	May 22, 2011	Kobudo Martial Arts Communication Space, Tiger Hall	Nagoya	
144	Deep / Smash: Japan MMA League 2011: Raising an Army	May 7, 2011	Shinkiba 1st Ring	Tokyo	
143	Deep: clubDeep in Diana	April 24, 2011	Club Diana	Tokyo	
142	Deep: 53 Impact	April 22, 2011	Korakuen Hall	Bunkyo, Tokyo, Japan	
141	Deep: Annihilate!	March 13, 2011	Shibuya Ax	Tokyo	
140	Deep: Tokyo Impact	February 27, 2011	Shinjuku Face	Shinjuku, Tokyo, Japan	
139	Deep: 52 Impact	February 25, 2011	Korakuen Hall	Bunkyo, Tokyo, Japan	
138	Deep: clubDeep Nagoya: Kobudo Fight 2	February 13, 2011	Asunal Kanayama Hall	Nagoya	
137	Deep: Shizuoka Impact 2011	February 6, 2011	Twin Messe	Shizuoka	
136	Deep: Kobudo Fight Future Challenge 9	December 19, 2010	Kobudo Martial Arts Communication Space, Tiger Hall	Nagoya	
135	Deep: 51 Impact	December 11, 2010	Differ Ariake	Tokyo	
134	Deep: Future King Tournament 2010	December 11, 2010	Differ Ariake	Tokyo	
133	Deep: 50 Impact	October 24, 2010	JCB Hall	Tokyo	
132	Deep: Cage Impact 2010 in Hamamatsu	September 19, 2010	Act City	Hamamatsu	
131	Deep: clubDeep Nagoya: Kobudo Fight	September 5, 2010	Asunal Kanayama Hall	Nagoya	
130	Deep: 49 Impact	August 27, 2010	Korakuen Hall	Bunkyo, Tokyo, Japan	
129	Deep: clubDeep Hachioji 2	August 1, 2010	Keio Plaza Hotel	Tokyo	
128	Deep: Cage Impact in Nagoya	July 11, 2010	Zepp Nagoya	Nagoya	
127	Deep: 48 Impact	July 3, 2010	Differ Ariake	Tokyo	
126	Deep: Cage Impact 2010 in Osaka	June 6, 2010	Zepp Osaka	Osaka	
125	Deep: clubDeep Tokyo in Shinkiba 1st Ring	May 23, 2010	Shinkiba 1st Ring	Tokyo	
124	Deep: clubDeep Toyama: Barbarian Festival 8	May 16, 2010	Toyama Event Plaza	Toyama	
123	Deep: 47 Impact	April 17, 2010	Korakuen Hall	Bunkyo, Tokyo, Japan	
122	Deep: Kobudo Fight 9	April 11, 2010	Asunal Kanayama Hall	Nagoya	
121	Deep: clubDeep Tokyo in Shinjuku	March 28, 2010	Pink Big Pig	Tokyo	
120	Deep: 46 Impact	February 28, 2010	Korakuen Hall	Bunkyo, Tokyo, Japan	
119	Deep: 45 Impact	January 24, 2010	Zepp Osaka	Osaka	
118	Deep: Future King Tournament 2009	December 27, 2009	Gold's Gym South Tokyo Annex	Tokyo	
117	Deep: Cage Impact 2009	December 19, 2009	Differ Ariake	Tokyo	
116	Deep: Fan Thanksgiving Festival 2	November 10, 2009	Korakuen Hall	Bunkyo, Tokyo, Japan	
115	Deep: clubDeep Kyoto	November 3, 2009	Terrsa Hall	Kyoto	
114	Deep: Kobudo Fight 8	October 18, 2009	Kobudo Martial Arts Communication Space Tiger Hall	Nagoya	
113	Deep: 44 Impact	October 10, 2009	Korakuen Hall	Bunkyo, Tokyo, Japan	
112	Deep: Hamamatsu Impact	September 27, 2009	Act City	Hamamatsu	
111	Deep: Osaka Impact	August 30, 2009	Zepp Osaka	Osaka	
110	Deep: 43 Impact	August 23, 2009	Korakuen Hall	Bunkyo, Tokyo, Japan	
109	Deep: clubDeep Hachioji	August 2, 2009	Keio Plaza Hotel	Tokyo	
108	Deep: Nagoya Impact	July 26, 2009	Zepp Nagoya	Nagoya	
107	Deep: 42 Impact	June 30, 2009	Korakuen Hall	Bunkyo, Tokyo, Japan	
106	Deep: Toyama Impact	June 28, 2009	Toyama Techno Hall	Toyama	
105	Deep: clubDeep Osaka	June 7, 2009	Azalea Taisho Hall	Osaka	
104	Deep: Kobudo Fight 7	May 5, 2009	Kobudo Martial Arts Communication Space Tiger Hall	Nagoya	
103	Deep: 41 Impact	April 16, 2009	Korakuen Hall	Bunkyo, Tokyo, Japan	
102	Deep: clubDeep Tokyo: Protect Cup Final	March 14, 2009	Shinkiba 1st Ring	Tokyo	
101	Deep: Kobudo Fight 6	March 1, 2009	Kobudo Martial Arts Communication Space Tiger Hall	Nagoya	
100	Deep: 40 Impact	February 20, 2009	Korakuen Hall	Bunkyo, Tokyo, Japan	
99	Deep: Fan Thanksgiving Festival	February 10, 2009	Korakuen Hall	Bunkyo, Tokyo, Japan	
98	Deep: Future King Tournament 2008	December 28, 2008	Gold's Gym South Tokyo Annex	Tokyo	
97	Deep: Protect Impact 2008	December 22, 2008	Shinjuku Face	Shinjuku, Tokyo, Japan	
96	Deep: 39 Impact	December 10, 2008	Korakuen Hall	Bunkyo, Tokyo, Japan	
95	Deep: Double Impact	December 6, 2008	Osaka Prefectural Gymnasium	Osaka	
94	Deep: Kobudo Fight 5	November 30, 2008	Kobudo Martial Arts Communication Space Tiger Hall	Nagoya	
93	Deep: 38 Impact	October 23, 2008	Korakuen Hall	Bunkyo, Tokyo, Japan	
92	Deep: clubDeep Hamamatsu	September 28, 2008	Act City	Hamamatsu	
91	Deep: Glove Amateur	September 20, 2008	Shinjuku Face	Shinjuku, Tokyo, Japan	
90	Deep: Glove 3	September 20, 2008	Shinjuku Face	Shinjuku, Tokyo, Japan	
89	Deep: Kobudo Fight 4	September 13, 2008	Kobudo Martial Arts Communication Space Tiger Hall	Nagoya	
88	Deep: clubDeep Kyoto	August 30, 2008	Terrsa Hall	Kyoto	
87	Deep: 37 Impact	August 17, 2008	Korakuen Hall	Bunkyo, Tokyo, Japan	
86	Deep: Gladiator	August 16, 2008	Momotaro Arena	Okayama	
85	Deep: Megaton Grand Prix 2008 Finals	August 2, 2008	Shinjuku Face	Shinjuku, Tokyo, Japan	
84	Deep: 36 Impact	July 27, 2008	Zepp Osaka	Osaka	
83	Deep: clubDeep Nagoya: MB3z Impact, All Stand Up	June 29, 2008	Zepp Nagoya	Nagoya	
82	Deep: Glove 2	June 15, 2008	Shinjuku Face	Shinjuku, Tokyo, Japan	
81	Deep: clubDeep Toyama: Barbarian Festival 7	June 1, 2008	Toyama Event Plaza	Toyama	
80	Deep: clubDeep Tokyo	May 24, 2008	Shinjuku Face	Shinjuku, Tokyo, Japan	
79	Deep: Megaton Grand Prix 2008 Semifinal	May 24, 2008	Shinjuku Face	Shinjuku, Tokyo, Japan	
78	Deep: 35 Impact	May 19, 2008	Korakuen Hall	Bunkyo, Tokyo, Japan	
77	Deep: Kobudo Fight 3	April 20, 2008	Kobudo Martial Arts Communication Space Tiger Hall	Nagoya	
76	Deep: Megaton Grand Prix 2008 Opening Round	March 29, 2008	Shinjuku Face	Shinjuku, Tokyo, Japan	
75	Deep: clubDeep Tokyo	March 29, 2008	Shinjuku Face	Shinjuku, Tokyo, Japan	
74	Deep: 34 Impact	February 22, 2008	Korakuen Hall	Bunkyo, Tokyo, Japan	
73	Deep: Kobudo Fight 2	February 17, 2008	Kobudo Martial Arts Communication Space Tiger Hall	Nagoya	
72	Deep: Future King Tournament 2007	January 14, 2008	Shinjuku Face	Shinjuku, Tokyo, Japan	
71	Deep: Protect Impact 2007	December 22, 2007	Umeda Stella Hall	Osaka	
70	Deep: 33 Impact	December 12, 2007	Korakuen Hall	Bunkyo, Tokyo, Japan	
69	Deep: clubDeep Kanazawa	December 9, 2007	Ishikawa Industrial Pavilion Second Hall	Kanazawa	
68	Deep: Kobudo Fight 1	November 3, 2007	Kobudo Martial Arts Communication Space Tiger Hall	Nagoya	
67	Deep: clubDeep Sendai	October 28, 2007	Zepp Sendai	Sendai	
66	Deep: clubDeep Hamamatsu	October 21, 2007	Act City	Hamamatsu	
65	Deep: clubDeep Osaka	October 13, 2007	Azalea Taisho Hall	Osaka	
64	Deep: 32 Impact	October 9, 2007	Korakuen Hall	Bunkyo, Tokyo, Japan	
63	Deep: clubDeep Yamaguchi	September 23, 2007	Shinnanyo Gymnasium	Shinnan'yo	
62	Deep: clubDeep Tokyo	September 15, 2007	Shinjuku Face	Shinjuku, Tokyo, Japan	
61	Deep: 31 Impact	August 5, 2007	Korakuen Hall	Bunkyo, Tokyo, Japan	
60	Deep: Glove	July 26, 2007	Korakuen Hall	Bunkyo, Tokyo, Japan	
59	Deep: CMA Festival 2	July 23, 2007	Korakuen Hall	Bunkyo, Tokyo, Japan	
58	Deep: 30 Impact	July 8, 2007	Zepp Osaka	Osaka, Japan	
57	Deep: Deep in Yamagata	June 24, 2007	Mikawa Town Gymnasium	Mikawa	
56	Deep: Oyaji Deep	June 16, 2007	Shinjuku Face	Shinjuku, Tokyo, Japan	
55	Deep: clubDeep Tokyo	June 16, 2007	Shinjuku Face	Shinjuku, Tokyo, Japan	
54	Deep: clubDeep Nagoya: MB3z Impact, Power of a Dream	June 10, 2007	Zepp Nagoya	Nagoya	
53	Deep: 1st Amateur Impact	May 27, 2007	Mach Dojo	Ryugasaki	
52	Deep: clubDeep Toyama: Barbarian Festival 6	May 13, 2007	Toyama Event Plaza	Toyama	
51	Deep: 29 Impact	April 13, 2007	Korakuen Hall	Bunkyo, Tokyo, Japan	
50	Deep: 28 Impact	February 16, 2007	Korakuen Hall	Bunkyo, Tokyo, Japan	
49	Deep: 27 Impact	December 20, 2006	Korakuen Hall	Bunkyo, Tokyo, Japan	
48	Deep: clubDeep Tokyo: Future King Tournament 2006	December 9, 2006	Shinjuku Face	Shinjuku, Tokyo, Japan	
47	Deep: clubDeep Toyama: Barbarian Festival 5	November 19, 2006	Toyama Event Plaza	Toyama	
46	Deep: 26 Impact	October 10, 2006	Korakuen Hall	Bunkyo, Tokyo, Japan	
45	Deep: clubDeep Hakuba: Monster Challenge 2	August 12, 2006	Hakuba47 Mountain Sports Park	Hakuba	
44	Deep: 25 Impact	August 4, 2006	Korakuen Hall	Bunkyo, Tokyo, Japan	
43	Deep: clubDeep Tokyo	July 8, 2006	Shinjuku Face	Shinjuku, Tokyo, Japan	
42	Deep: clubDeep Toyama: Barbarian Festival 4	June 18, 2006	Toyama Event Plaza	Toyama	
41	Deep: clubDeep Hiroshima: Monster Challenger	May 27, 2006	Saekiku Sports Center Subarena	Hiroshima	
40	Deep: CMA Festival	May 24, 2006	Korakuen Hall	Bunkyo, Tokyo, Japan	
39	Deep: clubDeep Nagoya: MB3z Impact, Di Entrare	May 21, 2006	Zepp Nagoya	Nagoya	
38	Deep: 24 Impact	April 11, 2006	Korakuen Hall	Bunkyo, Tokyo, Japan	
37	Deep: 23 Impact	February 5, 2006	Korakuen Hall	Bunkyo, Tokyo, Japan	
36	Deep: Future King Tournament 2005	December 25, 2005	Gold's Gym South Tokyo Annex	Tokyo	
35	Deep: 22 Impact	December 2, 2005	Korakuen Hall	Bunkyo, Tokyo, Japan	
34	Deep: clubDeep Toyama: Barbarian Festival 3	October 30, 2005	Toyama Event Plaza	Toyama	
33	Deep: 21st Impact	October 28, 2005	Korakuen Hall	Bunkyo, Tokyo, Japan	
32	Deep: 20th Impact	September 3, 2005	Differ Ariake	Tokyo	
31	Deep: 19th Impact	July 8, 2005	Korakuen Hall	Bunkyo, Tokyo, Japan	
30	Deep: clubDeep Toyama: Barbarian Festival 2	May 15, 2005	Toyama Event Plaza	Toyama	
29	Deep: Hero 1	April 17, 2005	Zepp Nagoya	Nagoya	
28	Deep: clubDeep Fukuoka: World Best Festival	April 10, 2005	Murasaki River Event Hall	Fukuoka	
27	Deep: 18th Impact	February 12, 2005	Korakuen Hall	Bunkyo, Tokyo, Japan	
26	Deep: 17th Impact	December 18, 2004	Differ Ariake	Tokyo	
25	Deep: clubDeep Osaka	November 28, 2004	Delfin Arena	Osaka	
24	Deep: 16th Impact	October 30, 2004	Korakuen Hall	Bunkyo, Tokyo, Japan	
23	Deep: clubDeep Toyama: Barbarian Festival 1	October 24, 2004	Toyama Event Plaza	Toyama	
22	Deep: Chonan Festival	October 3, 2004	Mikawa Town Gymnasium	Mikawa	
21	Deep: 15th Impact	July 3, 2004	Differ Ariake	Tokyo	
20	Deep: 14th Impact	April 18, 2004	Umeda Stella Hall	Osaka	
19	Deep: clubDeep Fukuoka: Team Roken Festival	March 20, 2004	TNC Broadcast Paveria Hall	Fukuoka	
18	Deep: 13th Impact	January 22, 2004		Tokyo	
17	Deep: clubDeep Osaka	December 7, 2003	Delfin Arena	Osaka	
16	Deep: clubDeep West Chofu	November 24, 2003	West Chofu Combat Sports Arena	Tokyo	
15	Deep: 12th Impact	September 15, 2003	Ota Ward Gymnasium	Tokyo	
14	Deep: 11th Impact	July 13, 2003	Grand Cube	Osaka	
13	Deep: 10th Impact	June 25, 2003	Korakuen Hall	Bunkyo, Tokyo, Japan	
12	Deep: clubDeep: Challenge in Club Ozon	May 25, 2003	Club Ozon	Nagoya	
11	Deep: 9th Impact	May 5, 2003	Korakuen Hall	Bunkyo, Tokyo, Japan	
10	Deep: 8th Impact	March 4, 2003	Korakuen Hall	Bunkyo, Tokyo, Japan	
9	Deep: 7th Impact	December 8, 2002	Differ Ariake	Tokyo	
8	Deep: clubDeep Ozon	November 10, 2002	Club Ozon	Nagoya	
7	Deep: 6th Impact	September 7, 2002	Ariake Coliseum	Tokyo	
6	Deep: clubDeep Ozon	July 14, 2002	Club Ozon	Nagoya	
5	Deep: 5th Impact	June 9, 2002	Differ Ariake	Tokyo	
4	Deep: 4th Impact	March 30, 2002	Aichi Prefectural Gymnasium	Nagoya	
3	Deep: 3rd Impact	December 23, 2001	Differ Ariake	Tokyo	
2	Deep: 2nd Impact	August 18, 2001	Yokohama Cultural Gymnasium	Yokohama	
1	Deep: 1st Impact	January 8, 2001	Aichi Prefectural Gymnasium	Nagoya	

== Event locations ==
These cities have hosted Deep events up to Deep - Tokyo Impact: Lightweight GP 2013 opening round.

- Japan (197)

Tokyo – 112
Nagoya - 29
Osaka - 17
Toyama - 13
Hamamatsu - 6
Kasugai - 2
Mikawa - 2
Shizuoka - 2
Kyoto - 2
Yokohama - 1
Kitakyushu - 1
Fukuoka - 1
Hiroshima - 1
Hakuba - 1
Ryūgasaki - 1
Shinnan'yō - 1
Sendai - 1
Fuji - 1
Ichinomiya - 1
Okayama - 1
Kanazawa - 1

== See also ==
- List of Deep champions
- Deep Jewels events
- Jewels (mixed martial arts)
