= 2009 in Deep =

Mixed martial arts events

Information
- First date: February 10, 2009
- Last date: December 27, 2009

Events
- Total events: 20

Fights
- Total fights: 205
- Title fights: 8

Chronology
| 2008 in Deep | 2009 in Deep | 2010 in Deep |

The year 2009 was the 9th year in the history of Deep, a mixed martial arts promotion based in Japan. In 2009 Deep held 20 events beginning with, Deep: Fan Thanksgiving Festival.

== Title fights ==
Title fights in 2009
| Weight class | | | | Method | Round | Time | Event | Notes |
|---|---|---|---|---|---|---|---|---|
| Welterweight | Seichi Ikemoto (c) | def. | Hidetaka Monma | TKO (Knee to the Body and Punches) | 1 | 1:42 | Deep: 40 Impact | (Note: For the Deep Welterweight Championship.) |
| Lightweight | Katsunori Kikuno | def. | Koichiro Matsumoto | KO (Punch) | 1 | 4:32 | Deep: 41 Impact | (Note: For the Deep Lightweight Championship.) |
| Middleweight | Riki Fukuda | def. | Yuichi Nakanishi (c) | Decision (Unanimous) | 3 | 5:00 | Deep: 42 Impact | (Note: For the Deep Middleweight Championship.) |
| Featherweight | Takafumi Otsuka | def. | Dokonjonosuke Mishima (c) | Decision (Unanimous) | 3 | 5:00 | Deep: 43 Impact | (Note: For the Deep Featherweight Championship.) |
| Bantamweight | Masakazu Imanari (c) | def. | Tomohiko Hori | Decision (Unanimous) | 3 | 5:00 | Deep: 43 Impact | (Note: For the Deep Bantamweight Championship.) |
| Megatonweight | Yusuke Kawaguchi (c) | def. | Seigo Mizuguchi | TKO (Leg Kicks) | 3 | 1:27 | Deep: 44 Impact | (Note: For the Deep Megatonweight Championship.) |
| Women's Lightweight | Miku Matsumoto (c) | def. | Tomomi Sunaba | Decision (Unanimous) | 2 | 5:00 | Deep: 44 Impact | (Note: For the Deep Women's Lightweight Championship.) |
| Megatonweight | Yusuke Kawaguchi (c) | def. | Roque Martinez | Decision (Unanimous) | 3 | 5:00 | Deep: Cage Impact 2009 | (Note: For the Deep Megatonweight Championship.) |

== Events list ==
| # | Event title | Date | Arena | Location |
|---|---|---|---|---|
| 118 | Deep: Future King Tournament 2009 | December 27, 2009 | Gold's Gym South Tokyo Annex | Tokyo |
| 117 | Deep: Cage Impact 2009 | December 19, 2009 | Differ Ariake | Tokyo |
| 116 | Deep: Fan Thanksgiving Festival 2 | November 10, 2009 | Korakuen Hall | Tokyo |
| 115 | Deep: clubDeep Kyoto | November 3, 2009 | Terrsa Hall | Kyoto |
| 114 | Deep: Kobudo Fight 8 | October 18, 2009 | Kobudo Martial Arts Communication Space Tiger Hall | Nagoya |
| 113 | Deep: 44 Impact | October 10, 2009 | Korakuen Hall | Tokyo |
| 112 | Deep: Hamamatsu Impact | September 27, 2009 | Act City | Hamamatsu |
| 111 | Deep: Osaka Impact | August 30, 2009 | Zepp Osaka | Osaka |
| 110 | Deep: 43 Impact | August 23, 2009 | Korakuen Hall | Tokyo |
| 109 | Deep: clubDeep Hachioji | August 2, 2009 | Keio Plaza Hotel | Tokyo |
| 108 | Deep: Nagoya Impact | July 26, 2009 | Zepp Nagoya | Nagoya |
| 107 | Deep: 42 Impact | June 30, 2009 | Korakuen Hall | Tokyo |
| 106 | Deep: Toyama Impact | June 28, 2009 | Toyama Techno Hall | Toyama |
| 105 | Deep: clubDeep Osaka | June 7, 2009 | Azalea Taisho Hall | Osaka |
| 104 | Deep: Kobudo Fight 7 | May 5, 2009 | Kobudo Martial Arts Communication Space Tiger Hall | Nagoya |
| 103 | Deep: 41 Impact | April 16, 2009 | Korakuen Hall | Tokyo |
| 102 | Deep: clubDeep Tokyo: Protect Cup Final | March 14, 2009 | Shinkiba 1st Ring | Tokyo |
| 101 | Deep: Kobudo Fight 6 | March 1, 2009 | Kobudo Martial Arts Communication Space Tiger Hall | Nagoya |
| 100 | Deep: 40 Impact | February 20, 2009 | Korakuen Hall | Tokyo |
| 99 | Deep: Fan Thanksgiving Festival | February 10, 2009 | Korakuen Hall | Tokyo |

== Deep: Fan Thanksgiving Festival ==
Deep: Fan Thanksgiving Festival was an event held on February 10, 2009 at Korakuen Hall in Tokyo.

=== Results ===
Main Card
| Weight class | | | | Method | Round | Time | Notes |
|---|---|---|---|---|---|---|---|
| | Daiki Hata | def. | Shoji Maruyama | Decision (Unanimous) | 3 | 5:00 |
| | Asato Hashimoto | def. | Motoki Awaji | Decision (Unanimous) | 2 | 5:00 |

== Deep: 40 Impact ==
Deep: 40 Impact was an event held on February 20, 2009 at Korakuen Hall in Tokyo.

=== Results ===
Main Card
| Weight class | | | | Method | Round | Time | Notes |
|---|---|---|---|---|---|---|---|
| Welterweight | Seichi Ikemoto (c) | def. | Hidetaka Monma | TKO (Knee to the Body and Punches) | 1 | 1:42 | (Note: For the Deep Welterweight Championship.) |
| | Riki Fukuda | def. | Ryuta Sakurai | TKO (Punches) | 1 | 0:45 |
| | Katsunori Kikuno | def. | Bu Kyung Jung | TKO (Kick to the Body and Soccer Kicks) | 1 | 4:15 |
| | Koichiro Matsumoto | def. | Jutaro Nakao | Decision (Unanimous) | 3 | 5:00 |
| | Hidehiko Hasegawa | def. | Makoto Ishikawa | Decision (Unanimous) | 2 | 5:00 |
| | Kazuhisa Tazawa | def. | Tim Persey | Submission (Scarf Hold) | 1 | 2:55 |
| | Shunsuke Inoue | vs. | Minoru Kato | Draw | 2 | 5:00 |
| | Hiroki Nagaoka | def. | Yoshitomo Watanabe | Decision (Unanimous) | 2 | 5:00 |
| | Kota Okazawa | def. | Yuki Ito | Decision (Majority) | 2 | 5:00 |
| | Naohiro Mizuno | def. | Hiroto Hattori | Decision (Unanimous) | 2 | 5:00 |
| | Muneyuki Sato | def. | Yasuhiro Motomura | TKO (Punches) | 1 | 4:06 |
| | Hideto Kondo | vs. | Yutaka Kobayashi | Draw | 2 | 5:00 |

== Deep: Kobudo Fight 6 ==
Deep: Kobudo Fight 6 was an event held on March 1, 2009 at Kobudo Martial Arts Communication Space Tiger Hall in Nagoya.

=== Results ===
Main Card
| Weight class | | | | Method | Round | Time | Notes |
|---|---|---|---|---|---|---|---|
| | Masaru Kadowaki | def. | Makoto Kamaya | Decision (Unanimous) | 2 | 5:00 |
| | Fuhito Hasegawa | def. | Daisuke Orito | TKO (Punches) | 1 | 3:22 |
| | Shinichiro Tanaka | def. | Tetsuya Fukunaga | TKO (Punches) | 1 | 2:52 |
| | Kei Nanyo | def. | Ricardo Vicente Yagi | TKO (Punches) | 1 | 2:50 |

== Deep: clubDeep Tokyo: Protect Cup Final ==
Deep: clubDeep Tokyo: Protect Cup Final was an event held on March 14, 2009 at Shinkiba 1st Ring in Tokyo.

=== Results ===
Main Card
| Weight class | | | | Method | Round | Time | Notes |
|---|---|---|---|---|---|---|---|
| | Yuya Shirai | def. | Yoon Young Kim | Submission (Rear-Naked Choke) | 3 | 2:59 |
| | Tomohiko Hori | def. | Isao Terada | Decision (Unanimous) | 2 | 5:00 |
| | Yasushi Kitazaki | def. | Sen Nakadai | Submission (Armbar) | 2 | 0:30 |
| | Shunji Kosaka | def. | Mamoru Nakamura | KO (Punch) | 1 | 1:07 |
| | Hiroki Sato | def. | Tatsuhiko Nishizaka | KO (Punch) | 1 | 0:06 |
| | Mateus Irie Nechio | def. | Noboru Onishi | KO (Punch) | 1 | 2:51 |
| | Sadao Kondo | def. | Yasuaki Kishimoto | Decision (Majority) | 2 | 5:00 |
| | Hiryu Okamoto | def. | Ryosuke Komori | Decision (Unanimous) | 2 | 5:00 |
| | Tetsuya Yoshioka | vs. | Ryoji Suzuki | Draw | 2 | 5:00 |
| | Shota Utsunomiya | def. | Satoshi Inaba | Decision (Unanimous) | 2 | 5:00 |
| | Tomohiko Hori | def. | Seiji Akao | Submission (Rear-Naked Choke) | 2 | 3:01 |

== Deep: 41 Impact ==
Deep: 41 Impact was an event held on April 16, 2009 at Korakuen Hall in Tokyo.

=== Results ===
Main Card
| Weight class | | | | Method | Round | Time | Notes |
|---|---|---|---|---|---|---|---|
| Lightweight | Katsunori Kikuno | def. | Koichiro Matsumoto | KO (Punch) | 1 | 4:32 | (Note: For the Deep Lightweight Championship.) |
| | Miku Matsumoto | def. | Nicdali Rivera-Calanoc | TKO (Knees to the Body) | 1 | 0:21 |
| | Kazuyuki Miyata | def. | Jae Hyun So | Submission (Guillotine Choke) | 1 | 2:31 |
| | Ryuki Ueyama | def. | Kosei Kubota | Decision (Unanimous) | 2 | 5:00 |
| | Hiromitsu Kanehara | def. | Kenji Nagai | TKO (Punches) | 2 | 3:02 |
| | Yuji Sakuragi | def. | Minoru Kato | KO (Punch) | 2 | 0:59 |
| | Toshiaki Kitada | def. | Joe Taimanglo | Submission (Guillotine Choke) | 1 | 1:29 |
| | Seigo Mizuguchi | def. | Katsumi Yamada | Submission (Scarf Hold) | 1 | 0:19 |
| | Tomoya Miyashita | def. | Takashige Hirukawa | Submission (Brabo Choke) | 1 | 2:39 |
| | Won Sik Park | def. | Naoki Matsushita | TKO (Doctor Stoppage) | 1 | 3:59 |
| | Yasuhiro Kawasaki | def. | Shun Yagi | TKO (Punches) | 1 | 3:02 |

== Deep: Kobudo Fight 7 ==
Deep: Kobudo Fight 7 was an event held on May 5, 2009 at Kobudo Martial Arts Communication Space Tiger Hall in Nagoya.

=== Results ===
Main Card
| Weight class | | | | Method | Round | Time | Notes |
|---|---|---|---|---|---|---|---|
| | Yasuaki Kishimoto | vs. | Shinichiro Tanaka | Draw | 2 | 5:00 |
| | Fuhito Hasegawa | def. | Takashi Fujii | Decision (Unanimous) | 2 | 5:00 |
| | Keita Yoshikawa | def. | Masaru Kadowaki | Decision (Unanimous) | 2 | 5:00 |
| | Yasutomo Katsuki | vs. | Kozaburo Muramatsu | Draw | 2 | 5:00 |

== Deep: clubDeep Osaka ==
Deep: clubDeep Osaka was an event held on June 7, 2009 at Azalea Taisho Hall in Osaka.

=== Results ===
Main Card
| Weight class | | | | Method | Round | Time | Notes |
|---|---|---|---|---|---|---|---|
| | Yoon Young Kim | def. | Ken Hamamura | | 1 | 2:44 |
| | Atsushi Kondo | def. | Miya Mo | TKO (Punches) | 1 | 2:55 |
| | Makoto Kamaya | def. | Jae Hyun So | Submission (Arm-Triangle Choke) | 1 | 2:30 |
| | Tadaaki Yamamoto | vs. | Noriyuki Takeuchi | Draw | 2 | 5:00 |
| | Yuki Ueshima | def. | Mamoru Uoi | Decision (Unanimous) | 2 | 5:00 |
| | Yusuke Hoshiko | vs. | Kenichi Tanaka | Draw | 2 | 5:00 |
| | Naritoshi Kakuta | def. | Shinsuke Takeda | Submission (Armbar) | 1 | 4:18 |

== Deep: Toyama Impact ==
Deep: Toyama Impact was an event held on June 28, 2009 at Toyama Techno Hall in Toyama.

=== Results ===
Main Card
| Weight class | | | | Method | Round | Time | Notes |
|---|---|---|---|---|---|---|---|
| | Miku Matsumoto | def. | Lisa Ellis | Submission (Armbar) | 3 | 2:53 |
| | Yoshihiro Tomioka | def. | Takafumi Ito | TKO (Punches) | 2 | 4:07 |
| | Kenji Arai | def. | Kunihiro Watanabe | Submission (Rear-Naked Choke) | 2 | 1:13 |
| | Seigo Mizuguchi | def. | Tokuzo Tokuzo | Submission (Scarf Hold) | 1 | 1:04 |
| | Yuichi Ikari | def. | Takaaki Aoki | Decision (Unanimous) | 2 | 5:00 |
| | Shinobu Aoyama | def. | Hiroshi Sakamoto | Decision (Unanimous) | 2 | 5:00 |
| | Takahiro Kajita | def. | Yuya Osugi | TKO (Punches) | 1 | 3:36 |
| | Akimitsu Tsuchiya | def. | Tamotsu Kitada | TKO (Punches) | 1 | 1:34 |
| | Takashi Fujii | def. | Kazuki Taira | TKO (Punches) | 1 | 3:21 |
| | Tomoaki Miyamoto | def. | Tomofumi Nakamura | Submission (Triangle Choke) | 1 | 0:39 |
| | Hirotaka Himeno | def. | Daiki Nakahara | Submission (Anaconda Choke) | 1 | 4:20 |
| | Toshio Shibata | def. | Shotaro Sato | KO (Head Kick) | 1 | 0:46 |

== Deep: 42 Impact ==
Deep: 42 Impact was an event held on June 30, 2009 at Korakuen Hall in Tokyo.

=== Results ===
Main Card
| Weight class | | | | Method | Round | Time | Notes |
|---|---|---|---|---|---|---|---|
| Middleweight | Riki Fukuda | def. | Yuichi Nakanishi (c) | Decision (Unanimous) | 3 | 5:00 | (Note: For the Deep Middleweight Championship.) |
| | Kazuyuki Miyata | def. | Takeshi Yamazaki | Decision (Unanimous) | 3 | 5:00 |
| | Hiromitsu Kanehara | vs. | Ryuta Sakurai | Draw | 2 | 5:00 |
| | Young Choi | def. | Bernard Ackah | Decision (Unanimous) | 2 | 5:00 |
| | Koji Kanechika | def. | Kazuhisa Tazawa | Decision (Unanimous) | 2 | 5:00 |
| | Toshikazu Iseno | def. | Kleber Koike Erbst | Decision (Unanimous) | 2 | 5:00 |
| | Myung Ho Bae | def. | Yusaku Tsukumo | Decision (Unanimous) | 2 | 5:00 |
| | Shigetoshi Iwase | def. | Taisuke Okuno | Decision (Unanimous) | 2 | 5:00 |
| | Hiroki Sato | def. | Kenji Nagai | Decision (Unanimous) | 2 | 5:00 |
| | Tomoya Miyashita | def. | Hiryu Okamoto | Submission (Guillotine Choke) | 1 | 1:34 |
| | Ryota Uozumi | def. | Pat Uncangco | Decision (Unanimous) | 2 | 5:00 |
| | Tomoya Kato | def. | Motoki Awaji | TKO (Punches) | 1 | 1:30 |
| | Tatsumitsu Wada | def. | Tatsuya Tsuchida | Submission (Rear-Naked Choke) | 1 | 2:14 |
| | Yusuke Kagiyama | def. | Yasuhiro Kawasaki | Decision (Unanimous) | 2 | 5:00 |

== Deep: Nagoya Impact ==
Deep: Nagoya Impact was an event held on July 26, 2009 at Zepp Nagoya in Nagoya.

=== Results ===
Main Card
| Weight class | | | | Method | Round | Time | Notes |
|---|---|---|---|---|---|---|---|
| | Won Sik Park | def. | Atsuhiro Tsuboi | TKO (Doctor Stoppage) | 1 | 3:21 |
| | Yasuaki Kishimoto | def. | Naoki Matsushita | Decision (Majority) | 2 | 5:00 |
| | Kenichi Hattori | def. | Jun Ando | Submission (Rear-Naked Choke) | 1 | 4:32 |
| | Shunsuke Inoue | def. | Taiki Yonashiro | Submission (Armbar) | 1 | 2:33 |
| | Shinichiro Tanaka | def. | Kei Nanyo | TKO (Punches) | 1 | 1:29 |
| | Fuhito Hasegawa | def. | Keita Yoshikawa | Decision (Unanimous) | 2 | 5:00 |
| | Fumitoshi Ishikawa | def. | Naoki Kimura | Decision (Split) | 2 | 5:00 |
| | Hiroyuki Tsuzuki | def. | Takao Nakajima | KO (Punch) | 2 | 0:46 |
| | Naoyuki Kato | def. | Naoki Kawai | TKO (Punches) | 2 | 1:04 |

== Deep: clubDeep Hachioji ==
Deep: clubDeep Hachioji was an event held on August 2, 2009 at Keio Plaza Hotel in Tokyo.

=== Results ===
Main Card
| Weight class | | | | Method | Round | Time | Notes |
|---|---|---|---|---|---|---|---|
| | Shunji Kosaka | vs. | Katsumi Yamada | Draw | 2 | 5:00 |
| | Yasushi Kitazaki | def. | Jun Ando | TKO (Corner Stoppage) | 1 | 3:45 |
| | Yoshiaki Takahashi | def. | Muneyuki Sato | Decision (Majority) | 2 | 5:00 |
| | Shinji Ejiri | def. | Asao Hata | Technical Submission (Rear-Naked Choke) | 1 | 2:47 |
| | Yasuhiro Motomura | def. | Shota Utsunomiya | KO (Flying Knee) | 1 | 0:34 |
| | Goro Kobayashi | def. | Chiaki Wakana | Decision (Unanimous) | 2 | 5:00 |
| | Ryota Minawa | def. | Takashi Matsuoka | Decision (Unanimous) | 2 | 5:00 |
| | Tomoaki Ueyama | def. | Takeyoshi Ogawa | TKO (Doctor Stoppage) | 2 | 0:27 |
| | Takuya Inoue | def. | Masanori Hirata | Technical Submission (Triangle Choke) | 1 | 2:22 |
| | Kazuki Tokudome | def. | Takashi Ito | TKO (Doctor Stoppage) | 2 | 4:14 |

== Deep: 43 Impact ==
Deep: 43 Impact was an event held on August 23, 2009 at Korakuen Hall in Tokyo.

=== Results ===
Main Card
| Weight class | | | | Method | Round | Time | Notes |
|---|---|---|---|---|---|---|---|
| | Ryo Chonan | def. | Jutaro Nakao | Decision (Unanimous) | 3 | 5:00 |
| Featherweight | Takafumi Otsuka | def. | Dokonjonosuke Mishima (c) | Decision (Unanimous) | 3 | 5:00 | (Note: For the Deep Featherweight Championship.) |
| Bantamweight | Masakazu Imanari (c) | def. | Tomohiko Hori | Decision (Unanimous) | 3 | 5:00 | (Note: For the Deep Bantamweight Championship.) |
| | Bernard Ackah | def. | Ryushi Yanagisawa | TKO (Head Kick and Punches) | 1 | 0:07 |
| | Toshiaki Kitada | def. | Zach Makovsky | Submission (Rear-Naked Choke) | 1 | 4:22 |
| | Koichiro Matsumoto | def. | Shunichi Shimizu | Decision (Unanimous) | 2 | 5:00 |
| | Hans Stringer | def. | Yuji Sakuragi | TKO (Punches) | 2 | 2:11 |
| | Won Sik Park | def. | Yuichi Ikari | Submission (Rear-Naked Choke) | 1 | 4:58 |
| | Yoshitomo Watanabe | def. | Pat Ayuyu | TKO (Punches) | 2 | 4:56 |
| | Yuki Ito | vs. | Sadao Kondo | Draw | 2 | 5:00 |
| | Yasuhiro Kawasaki | def. | Tomoya Kato | Decision (Unanimous) | 2 | 5:00 |
| | Masato Kataoka | def. | Hideyuki Noro | Submission (Armbar) | 1 | 2:44 |
| | Tatsuya Tsuchida | def. | KZ KZ | Submission (Rear-Naked Choke) | 1 | 3:11 |

== Deep: Osaka Impact ==
Deep: Osaka Impact was an event held on August 30, 2009 at Zepp Osaka in Osaka.

=== Results ===
Main Card
| Weight class | | | | Method | Round | Time | Notes |
|---|---|---|---|---|---|---|---|
| | Yoshiro Maeda | def. | Kleber Koike Erbst | DQ (Groin Strike) | 1 | 4:00 |
| | Young Choi | def. | Yuya Aikawa | TKO (Punches) | 2 | 1:32 |
| | Yusaku Tsukumo | def. | Hiromu Nagado | Submission (Guillotine Choke) | 2 | 2:49 |
| | Teruhiko Kubo | def. | Hiroki Tanaka | Submission (Armbar) | 1 | 4:59 |
| | Koji Nakamura | def. | Zenta Yamazaki | TKO (Punches) | 2 | 3:34 |
| | Yuki Uejima | vs. | Hiroto Hattori | Draw | 2 | 5:00 |
| | Hiroshi Tomita | def. | Takahiro Suzuki | Submission (Kimura) | 1 | 1:23 |

== Deep: Hamamatsu Impact ==
Deep: Hamamatsu Impact was an event held on September 27, 2009 at Act City in Hamamatsu.

=== Results ===
Main Card
| Weight class | | | | Method | Round | Time | Notes |
|---|---|---|---|---|---|---|---|
| | Naoki Matsushita | def. | Luiz Andrade I | KO (Punch) | 2 | 4:20 |
| | Kleber Koike Erbst | def. | Takashi Fujii | KO (Head Kick) | 1 | 2:40 |
| | Yuta Watanabe | def. | Joao Batista Yoshimura | TKO (Punches) | 2 | 0:33 |
| | Minoru Kato | vs. | Tomoaki Hata | Draw | 2 | 5:00 |
| | Hiroyuki Nozawa | def. | Shun Yagi | Submission (North-South Choke) | 1 | 2:09 |
| | Henri Kakiuchi | def. | Shinsuke Takeda | Submission (Rear-Naked Choke) | 1 | 1:29 |
| | Mitsuru Yamaguchi | def. | Ryota Matsui | Submission (Guillotine Choke) | 1 | 1:17 |
| | Yasutomo Katsuki | def. | Yusuke Suzuki | Submission (Triangle Choke) | 1 | 2:20 |
| | Jacob Ito Ortiz | def. | Fernando Wolverine | Submission (Rear-Naked Choke) | 1 | 1:01 |
| | Hideki Sekine | def. | Yasuro Urayama | Submission (Kneebar) | 1 | 3:09 |
| | Anderson Sato | def. | Yoichi Ozawa | Submission (Armbar) | 1 | 1:09 |
| | Anderson Shiroma Miura | def. | Kazuki Miyanaga | TKO (Punches) | 1 | 1:53 |
| | Takayuki Ishihara | def. | Kenji Kato | Submission (Rear-Naked Choke) | 1 | 1:20 |

== Deep: 44 Impact ==
Deep: 44 Impact was an event held on October 10, 2009 at Korakuen Hall in Tokyo.

=== Results ===
Main Card
| Weight class | | | | Method | Round | Time | Notes |
|---|---|---|---|---|---|---|---|
| Megatonweight | Yusuke Kawaguchi (c) | def. | Seigo Mizuguchi | TKO (Leg Kicks) | 3 | 1:27 | (Note: For the Deep Megatonweight Championship.) |
| Women's Lightweight | Miku Matsumoto (c) | def. | Tomomi Sunaba | Decision (Unanimous) | 2 | 5:00 | (Note: For the Deep Women's Lightweight Championship.) |
| | Hidehiko Hasegawa | def. | Ryuki Ueyama | Decision (Unanimous) | 3 | 5:00 |
| | Ryuta Sakurai | def. | Hosea Ware | Submission (Straight Armbar) | 1 | 3:46 |
| | Hiromitsu Kanehara | def. | Makoto Miyazawa | TKO (Punches) | 1 | 0:25 |
| | Yuya Shirai | def. | Shigetoshi Iwase | Decision (Unanimous) | 2 | 5:00 |
| | Toshiaki Kitada | def. | Kleber Koike Erbst | Submission (Armbar) | 2 | 0:56 |
| | Takashige Hirukawa | def. | Hiryu Okamoto | Decision (Majority) | 2 | 5:00 |
| | Tatsunao Nagakura | def. | Fuhito Hasegawa | TKO (Shoulder Injury) | 1 | 1:19 |
| | Tomoya Kato | def. | Ryota Minawa | Decision (Majority) | 2 | 5:00 |
| | Tatsuhito Satsuma | def. | Hiroyuki Kobayashi | Decision (Unanimous) | 2 | 5:00 |

== Deep: Kobudo Fight 8 ==
Deep: Kobudo Fight 8 was an event held on October 18, 2009 at Kobudo Martial Arts Communication Space Tiger Hall in Nagoya.

=== Results ===
Main Card
| Weight class | | | | Method | Round | Time | Notes |
|---|---|---|---|---|---|---|---|
| | Naoyuki Kato | def. | Tsuyoshi Ito | TKO (Punches) | 1 | 3:28 |
| | Akimitsu Tsuchiya | def. | Kazuo Kimura | TKO (Punches) | 1 | 2:10 |
| | Sadae Numata | vs. | Yukiko Ozeki | Draw | 2 | 5:00 |
| | Isata Sato | def. | Takuma Totake | Submission (Armbar) | 1 | 0:40 |

== Deep: clubDeep Kyoto ==
Deep: clubDeep Kyoto was an event held on November 3, 2009 at Terrsa Hall in Kyoto.

=== Results ===
Main Card
| Weight class | | | | Method | Round | Time | Notes |
|---|---|---|---|---|---|---|---|
| | Tomoyuki Fukami | vs. | Yoshihiro Tomioka | Draw | 2 | 5:00 |
| | Yusaku Tsukumo | def. | Takashi Kobayashi | Decision (Unanimous) | 2 | 5:00 |
| | Yasuaki Kishimoto | def. | Myeon Bang Lee | Submission (Kneebar) | 1 | 2:55 |
| | Makoto Kamaya | def. | Takayoshi Ono | Decision (Unanimous) | 2 | 5:00 |
| | Atsushi Kondo | def. | Yusuke Hoshiko | Decision (Unanimous) | 2 | 5:00 |
| | Iwa Nema | def. | Takamasa Ono | Decision (Unanimous) | 2 | 5:00 |

== Deep: Fan Thanksgiving Festival 2 ==
Deep: Fan Thanksgiving Festival 2 was an event held on November 10, 2009 at Korakuen Hall in Tokyo.

=== Results ===
Main Card
| Weight class | | | | Method | Round | Time | Notes |
|---|---|---|---|---|---|---|---|
| | Ryuta Noji | def. | Ryan Goodman | TKO (Corner Stoppage) | 2 | 3:54 |
| | Atsushi Yamamoto | def. | Kyung Ho Kang | Decision (Unanimous) | 2 | 5:00 |
| | Hidetaka Monma | def. | Dong Hyun Kim | Decision (Unanimous) | 2 | 5:00 |
| | Dool Hee Lee | def. | Ryushi Yanagisawa | Decision (Unanimous) | 2 | 5:00 |
| | Yuko Oya | def. | Miyo Yoshida | Decision (Majority) | 2 | 5:00 |
| | Nozomu Oikawa | def. | Chun Pil Cho | Submission (Rear-Naked Choke) | 2 | 3:34 |
| | Miki Morifuji | def. | Han Sol Lee | Decision (Unanimous) | 2 | 5:00 |
| | Woo Hyon Baek | def. | Takashi Masuda | TKO (Punches) | 1 | 1:08 |
| | In Suk Oh | def. | Takayuki Ota | TKO (Punches) | 1 | 0:42 |

== Deep: Cage Impact 2009 ==
Deep: Cage Impact 2009 was an event held on December 19, 2009 at Differ Ariake in Tokyo.

=== Results ===
Main Card
| Weight class | | | | Method | Round | Time | Notes |
|---|---|---|---|---|---|---|---|
| | Nobuhiro Obiya | def. | Toshikazu Iseno | TKO (Punches) | 2 | 1:49 |
| | Takeshi Yamazaki | vs. | Toshiaki Kitada | Draw | 3 | 5:00 |
| | Ryuta Sakurai | def. | Hiroki Sato | KO (Punch) | 1 | 2:13 |
| | Bernard Ackah | def. | Shunji Kosaka | TKO (Punches) | 1 | 0:34 |
| | Yuki Ito | def. | Naoki Matsushita | TKO (Punches) | 1 | 3:05 |
| | Hirohide Fujinuma | def. | Makoto Niyama | TKO (Punches) | 1 | 2:50 |
| | Hiryu Okamoto | def. | Kaiji Hirano | Decision (Unanimous) | 2 | 5:00 |
| | Yasuhiro Kawasaki | def. | Mitsuru Yamaguchi | TKO (Punches) | 1 | 3:03 |
| | Masakazu Imanari | def. | Justin Cruz | Submission (Rear-Naked Choke) | 1 | 2:39 |
| Megatonweight | Yusuke Kawaguchi (c) | def. | Roque Martinez | Decision (Unanimous) | 3 | 5:00 | (Note: For the Deep Megatonweight Championship.) |
| | Atsushi Yamamoto | def. | Tomoya Miyashita | Decision (Unanimous) | 3 | 5:00 |
| | Eiji Ishikawa | def. | Yoshitomo Watanabe | Decision (Majority) | 2 | 5:00 |
| | Koichiro Matsumoto | def. | Isamu Sugiuchi | Decision (Unanimous) | 2 | 5:00 |
| | Kenta Takagi | def. | Teruhiko Kubo | TKO (Doctor Stoppage) | 1 | 3:57 |
| | Sadao Kondo | def. | Atsuhiro Tsuboi | Decision (Unanimous) | 2 | 5:00 |
| | Yasuhiro Motomura | def. | Young Bok Kil | DQ (Accidental Knees to the Groin) | 2 | 0:00 |
| | Yu Yu | def. | Koji Kashikura | TKO (Punches) | 1 | 1:08 |

== Deep: Future King Tournament 2009 ==
Deep: Future King Tournament 2009 was an event held on December 27, 2009 at Gold's Gym South Tokyo Annex in Tokyo.

=== Results ===
Main Card
| Weight class | | | | Method | Round | Time | Notes |
|---|---|---|---|---|---|---|---|
| | Motonobu Tezuka | def. | Koji Nakamura | Submission (Triangle Choke) | 1 | 2:02 |
| | Takeshi Numajiri | def. | Yusuke Kitago | TKO (Punches) | 1 | 1:56 |
| | Shota Shimeya | def. | Takehito Ueda | Submission (Armbar) | 1 | 1:04 |
| | Yutaka Ueda | def. | Juri Ohara | Submission (Armbar) | 1 | 2:47 |
| | Tomoya Kato | def. | Kiyonobu Nishikata | TKO (Punches) | 1 | 2:26 |
| | Motonobu Tezuka | def. | Yoshiyuki Ishikawa | Submission (Kneebar) | 1 | 1:22 |
| | Koji Nakamura | def. | Kensaku Nakamura | Decision (Unanimous) | 2 | 5:00 |
| | Yusuke Kitago | def. | Takuya Inoue | KO (Punch) | 2 | 1:12 |
| | Takeshi Numajiri | def. | Sota Kojima | TKO (Punches) | 2 | 1:59 |
| | Shota Shimeya | def. | Naoki Kunibu | Submission (Guillotine Choke) | 2 | 2:02 |
| | Juri Ohara | def. | Fumiya Hashimoto | KO (Punch) | 1 | 0:29 |
| | Yutaka Ueda | def. | Toru Kanamori | Submission (Triangle Choke) | 1 | 2:09 |
| | Tomoya Kato | def. | Takeshi Egami | TKO (Punches) | 1 | 4:30 |
| | Kiyonobu Nishikata | def. | Yutaka Kobayashi | Decision (Unanimous) | 2 | 5:00 |
| | Yoshiyuki Ishikawa | def. | Ryo Takagi | Decision (Unanimous) | 1 | 5:00 |
| | Motonobu Tezuka | def. | Yudai Aoyama | Submission (Armbar) | 1 | 1:58 |
| | Kensaku Nakamura | def. | Shiro Wakamatsu | Decision (Unanimous) | 1 | 5:00 |
| | Koji Nakamura | def. | Kota Ishibashi | Decision (Unanimous) | 1 | 5:00 |
| | Takuya Inoue | def. | Hiroyuki Kobayashi | Submission (Armbar) | 1 | 2:03 |
| | Yusuke Kitago | def. | Teruo Kawajiri | Decision (Unanimous) | 1 | 5:00 |
| | Sota Kojima | def. | Tatsuya Tsuchida | Decision (Split) | 1 | 5:00 |
| | Takeshi Numajiri | def. | Yuya Ito | Submission (Brabo Choke) | 1 | 0:27 |
| | Juri Ohara | def. | Kazuki Nomoto | TKO (Punches) | 1 | 4:54 |
| | Fumiya Hashimoto | def. | Toshinari Nakamura | TKO (Punches) | 1 | 1:11 |
| | Toru Kanamori | def. | Jun Matsuyama | Decision (Unanimous) | 1 | 5:00 |
| | Yutaka Ueda | def. | Akimitsu Tsuchiya | Submission (Armbar) | 1 | 2:18 |
| | Tomoya Kato | def. | Shogo Ohashi | TKO (Punches) | 1 | 1:08 |
| | Ryo Takagi | def. | Kenichi Ogura | Decision (Unanimous) | 1 | 5:00 |
| | Takuya Inoue | def. | Noriyuki Kurimoto | Decision (Unanimous) | 1 | 5:00 |

== See also ==
- List of Deep champions
- List of Deep events
