= Ryuki Ueyama =

Japanese mixed martial arts fighter

- Born: 17 April 1976 (age 50); Tokyo, Japan
- Nationality: Japanese
- Height: 5 ft 11 in (1.80 m)
- Weight: 156.1 lb (70.8 kg; 11.15 st)
- Division: Light Heavyweight; Middleweight; Welterweight; Lightweight
- Team: U-SPIRIT Japan Machida
- Years active: 1998-present

Mixed martial arts record
- Total: 37
- Wins: 13
- By knockout: 2
- By submission: 5
- By decision: 6
- Losses: 18
- By knockout: 4
- By submission: 2
- By decision: 11
- By disqualification: 1
- Draws: 5
- No contests: 1

Other information
- Mixed martial arts record from Sherdog

Ryuki Ueyama (born 17 April 1976 in Tokyo) is a Japanese mixed martial artist who most recently competed in the Lightweight division. He has fought for organizations such as Fighting Network RINGS, DEEP, Pancrase, Hero's and Pride FC.

== Fight career ==
=== Fighting Network RINGS (1998–2001) ===
Ueyama began his combat sports career with shoot style promotion UWF International under the tutelage of Kiyoshi Tamura. He competed on several undercards until its closure in 1996. His mixed martial arts career began when with Fighting Network RINGS on 21 September 1998 at Rings - Fighting Integration VI. He lost to Yasuhito Namekawa by decision. Ueyama lost to Namekawa again by decision on 21 February 1999. Ueyama picked up his first win less than a month later at Rings Australia. He beat Dennis Kefalinos by knee bar in round 1. He was disqualified for eye gouging in his next fight against Lee Hasdell on 23 April 1999 in Japan. After his fight with Hasdell, he went unbeaten for over a year and a half with wins over Willie Peeters, Yasuhito Namekawa and Tim Thomas, with draws against Lloyd Berg, Dave Menne and Kosei Kubota. Ueyama eventually lost on 20 March 2001 against Sokun Koh at Rings - Battle Genesis Vol. 7.

=== DEEP & Pancrase ===
Ueyama drew with Kosei Kubota for a second time on 18 August 2001 at DEEP - 2nd Impact. He lost a decision against Kiuma Kunioku at Pancrase - 2001 Anniversary Show a month later. He returned to DEEP in December of that year, defeating LaVerne Clark by TKO. Then at Pancrase - Spirit 2 he lost to Kazuo Misaki by decision.

==== DEEP Japan Middleweight Champion ====
On 9 June 2002, Ueyama entered the DEEP Middleweight tournament. He defeated Seiki Ryo and Takaharu Murahama before beating Eiji Ishikawa in the final to win the tournament. He then beat Gilson Ferreira at DEEP - 6th Impact in September to bring his record to 9-6-4. He lost a decision in March 2003 to Hayato Sakurai. On 15 September 2003 Ueyama defended his title against Masanori Suda; the fight ended in a draw.

=== Pride Bushido & DEEP return ===
Ueyama made his Pride FC debut on 15 February 2004 against Sean Sherk, Ueyama lost by decision. In his second fight for Pride he lost to Ikuhisa Minowa by split decision. On 18 December 2004, Ueyama returned to DEEP and lost to Ryuta Sakurai by TKO.

=== Hero's ===
He made his Hero's debut in 2006 on Hero's 5 with a decision loss to Rani Yahya. This match was the opening round of Hero's 2006 Lightweight Grand Prix. Ueyama was submitted by Vítor Ribeiro on 12 March 2007 at Hero's 8.

=== DEEP (2009–2010) ===
Ueyama returned to the DEEP organisation once again in 2009 with a decision victory over Kosei Kubota. Later in 2009 he lost decision against Hidehiko Hasegawa at DEEP - 44 Impact. Ueyama drew his last fight to date against Hidetaka Monma on 17 April 2010.

== Championships and awards ==
- DEEP
  - DEEP Middleweight Championship (1 Time, First)
  - 2002 DEEP Middleweight Championship Tournament Winner

== Mixed martial arts record ==
Professional record breakdown
36 matches	12 wins	18 losses
By knockout	2	4
By submission	5	2
By decision	5	11
By disqualification	0	1
Draws	5	
No contests	1	

Res.	Record	Opponent	Method	Event	Date	Round	Time	Location	Notes
Loss	12–18–5 (1)	Sho Kogane	Decision (unanimous)	Real 5: Real Fight Championship 5	12 June 2016	2	5:00	Tokyo, Japan	
Win	12–17–5 (1)	Chris Hilger	Decision (majority)	Real 4: Real Fight Championship 4	12 March 2016	2	5:00	Tokyo, Japan	
Loss	11–17–5 (1)	Roberto de Souza	Submission (arm-triangle choke)	RFC: Real Fight Championship 3	5 December 2015	1	2:13	Tokyo, Japan	
Loss	11–16–5 (1)	Daryl Lokoku	Decision (unanimous)	Grachan 15	30 November 2014	2	2:38	Tokyo, Japan	Welterweight bout.
Loss	11–15–5 (1)	Takafumi Ito	Decision (unanimous)	Pancrase: 258	11 May 2014	3	5:00	Tokyo, Japan	
Loss	11–14–5 (1)	Naoyuki Kotani	TKO (punches)	RINGS: Reincarnation	9 March 2012	1	2:32	Tokyo, Japan	
Win	11–13–5 (1)	Yutaka Ueda	Decision (unanimous)	Grabaka Live: 1st Cage Attack	15 October 2011	2	5:00	Tokyo, Japan	Return to Lightweight.
NC	10–13–5 (1)	Won Sik Park	No Contest (knee to downed opponent)	DEEP: 48 Impact	3 July 2010	1	4:16	Tokyo, Japan	Catchweight (74 kg) bout.
Draw	10–13–5	Hidetaka Monma	Draw	DEEP: 47 Impact	17 April 2010	3	5:00	Tokyo, Japan	
Loss	10–13–4	Hai Lin Ao	Decision (unanimous)	AOW 15: Ueyama vs. Aohailin	28 November 2009	2	5:00	Beijing, China	
Loss	10–12–4	Hidehiko Hasegawa	Decision (unanimous)	DEEP: 44 Impact	10 October 2009	3	5:00	Tokyo, Japan	
Win	10–11–4	Kosei Kubota	Decision (unanimous)	DEEP: 41 Impact	16 April 2009	2	5:00	Tokyo, Japan	Return to Welterweight.
Loss	9–11–4	Vítor Ribeiro	Submission (triangle armbar)	HERO'S 8	12 March 2007	1	1:48	Nagoya, Japan	Lightweight debut.
Loss	9–10–4	Rani Yahya	Decision (majority)	HERO'S 5	3 May 2006	2	5:00	Tokyo, Japan	HERO'S 2006 Lightweight Grand Prix opening round.
Loss	9–9–4	Ryuta Sakurai	TKO (punches)	DEEP: 17th Impact	18 December 2004	1	2:40	Tokyo, Japan	Middleweight bout; for the DEEP Middleweight Championship.
Loss	9–8–4	Ikuhisa Minowa	Decision (split)	PRIDE Bushido 5	14 October 2004	2	5:00	Osaka, Japan	
Loss	9–7–4	Sean Sherk	Decision (unanimous)	PRIDE Bushido 2	15 February 2004	2	5:00	Yokohama, Japan	
Draw	9–6–4	Masanori Suda	Draw	DEEP: 12th Impact	15 September 2003	3	5:00	Tokyo, Japan	Middleweight bout; for the DEEP Middleweight Championship.
Loss	9–6–3	Hayato Sakurai	Decision (unanimous)	DEEP: 8th Impact	4 March 2003	3	5:00	Tokyo, Japan	Welterweight debut.
Win	9–5–3	Gilson Ferreira	Submission (armbar)	DEEP: 6th Impact	7 September 2002	3	3:49	Tokyo, Japan	
Win	8–5–3	Eiji Ishikawa	Submission (toe hold)	DEEP: 5th Impact	9 June 2002	2	0:48	Tokyo, Japan	DEEP Japan Middleweight Championship Tournament Final.
Win	7–5–3	Takaharu Murahama	Submission (rear naked choke)	DEEP: 5th Impact	9 June 2002	3	1:44	Tokyo, Japan	DEEP Japan Middleweight Championship Tournament Semifinal.
Win	6–5–3	Seiki Ryo	Decision (majority)	DEEP: 5th Impact	9 June 2002	2	5:00	Tokyo, Japan	DEEP Japan Middleweight Championship Tournament Quarterfinal.
Loss	5–5–3	Kazuo Misaki	Decision (unanimous)	Pancrase: Spirit 2	17 February 2002	3	5:00	Osaka, Japan	
Win	5–4–3	LaVerne Clark	TKO (corner stoppage)	DEEP: 3rd Impact	23 December 2001	1	5:00	Tokyo, Japan	
Loss	4–4–3	Kiuma Kunioku	Decision (majority)	Pancrase: 2001 Anniversary Show	30 September 2001	2	5:00	Yokohama, Japan	Return to Middleweight.
Draw	4–3–3	Kosei Kubota	Draw	DEEP: 2nd Impact	18 August 2001	3	5:00	Yokohama, Japan	
Loss	4–3–2	Sokun Koh	TKO (kimura)	RINGS: Battle Genesis Vol. 7	20 March 2001	1	2:16	Tokyo, Japan	
Draw	4–2–2	Kosei Kubota	Draw	DEEP: 1st Impact	8 January 2001	3	5:00	Nagoya, Japan	
Win	4–2–1	Tim Thomas	Submission (ankle lock)	RINGS Australia: Free Fight Battle	12 November 2000	1	9:11	Brisbane, Australia	
Draw	3–2–1	Dave Menne	Draw	RINGS: Millennium Combine 2	15 June 2000	2	5:00	Tokyo, Japan	
Win	3–2	Yasuhito Namekawa	Decision	RINGS: Rise 5th	19 August 1999	3	5:00	Japan	
Win	2–2	Willie Peeters	TKO (lost points)	RINGS: Rise 4th	24 June 1999	3	3:05	Japan	
Loss	1–2	Lee Hasdell	Disqualification (eye gouging)	RINGS: Rise 2nd	23 April 1999	1	4:18	Japan	
Win	1–1	Dennis Kefalinos	Submission (knee bar)	RINGS Australia: NR 3	7 March 1999	1	4:40	Australia	Light Heavyweight debut.
Loss	0–1	Yasuhito Namekawa	Decision	RINGS: Final Capture	21 February 1999	1	20:00	Japan	
