= Riki Fukuda =

Japanese mixed martial arts fighter

- Born: January 6, 1981 (age 45); Gifu, Japan
- Nationality: Japanese
- Height: 6 ft 0 in (1.83 m)
- Weight: 185 lb (84 kg; 13 st 3 lb)
- Division: Heavyweight; Light Heavyweight; Middleweight
- Reach: 73.0 in (185 cm)
- Stance: Southpaw
- Fighting out of: Tokyo, Japan
- Team: Grabaka; American Kickboxing Academy; Haleo Top Team
- Years active: 2004–2017

Mixed martial arts record
- Total: 34
- Wins: 24
- By knockout: 12
- By decision: 12
- Losses: 9
- By knockout: 3
- By decision: 6
- No contests: 1

Other information
- Mixed martial arts record from Sherdog

Riki Fukuda (Japanese: 福田 力, Fukuda Riki; born January 6, 1981), is a Japanese mixed martial artist currently competing in the Middleweight division. A professional competitor since 2004, he has formerly competed for the UFC, EliteXC, DEEP, DREAM, K-1 (MMA), Shooto, and Pancrase. Currently, he runs an izakaya-style restaurant in Leiden, The Netherlands.

== Mixed martial arts career ==
=== Background ===
Fukuda was a member of the Yamanashi Gakuin University's wrestling team. At the All Japan University Championships, he placed third in 2002 and second in 2003 in his weight class. Fukuda then joined Fighting World of Japan Pro Wrestling and made his professional wrestling debut in March 2003.

=== Early career ===
In his professional mixed martial arts debut at SuperBrawl, Fukuda surprised many by taking Joe Doerksen to decision. Over the years, he has worked for the Japanese promotions Shooto, Pancrase and K-1. In February 2007, he made his debut in the EliteXC promotion at EliteXC Destiny. He then lost a close decision to Joey Villasenor on the September 15, 2007 EliteXC: Uprising card.

Fukuda fought at DREAM.8 as a late replacement for Yoon Dong-Sik, where he defeated Murilo Rua by unanimous decision. At DEEP 42, Riki defeated Yuichi Nakanishi via unanimous decision to become the DEEP Middleweight Champion. Fukuda successfully defended the title against Hiromitsu Kanehara at DEEP 46. At DEEP 49, Riki successfully defended the title against Ryuta Sakurai winning the fight via TKO due to knees. During his bout with Sakurai, Fukuda was able to push the pace, causing Sakurai to fall out of the cage twice. In the first round, Fukuda successfully completed a takedown, but in the process Sakurai fell out of the ring and hit his face on the bell. In the second round, Fukuda landed a knee to the midsection which cause Sakurai to fall, but as he fell he landed on the ground outside the ring; head first. Fukuda was given the victory by TKO, when Sakurai was not able to continue from the head injury.

=== Ultimate Fighting Championship ===
In October 2010, it was revealed Fukuda had signed with the UFC. Fukuda made his promotional debut against TUF 11 alumni, Nick Ring on February 27, 2011, at UFC 127. Fukuda lost his UFC debut by a controversial unanimous decision (29-28, 29-28, 29-28). All three judges gave Ring the first two rounds with Fukuda winning the final round, despite controlling all three rounds with takedowns. Despite the loss on the scorecards, UFC president Dana White felt Fukuda won the bout and stated on his Twitter account that both fighters would be paid a win bonus.

Fukuda was expected to face Rafael Natal on August 6, 2011, at UFC 133. However, Fukuda was forced out of the bout due to a knee injury sustained in a car accident and replaced by Costas Philippou.

Fukuda faced Steve Cantwell on February 26, 2012, at UFC 144. Fukuda defeated Cantwell via unanimous decision.

Fukuda lost to Costas Philippou on July 7, 2012, at UFC 148 via unanimous decision.

Fukuda next defeated Tom DeBlass via unanimous decision on November 10, 2012, at UFC on Fuel TV 6.

Fukuda faced Brad Tavares on March 3, 2013, at UFC on Fuel TV 8 and lost via unanimous decision. Fukuda was subsequently released from the organization after testing positive for banned substances during his post fight drug screening. It was later revealed to be linked to over the counter cold medicine Fukuda had taken when he fell ill during his process of making weight for the bout.

=== Road Fighting Championship ===
In August 2013, Fukuda signed with South Korea based promotion ROAD FC. Fukuda faced Hee Seung Kim in his debut bout at Road FC: Korea 1 on January 18, 2014. He won the fight via second-round TKO.

Fukuda then faced Dong Sik-Yoon at Road FC 16 on July 26, 2014. He won the fight via TKO, extending his post-UFC record to 2–0.

In his next fight, Fukuda faced Dool Hee Lee at Road FC 19 on November 9, 2014. Fukuda controlled the first round, however, the fight was declared a no-contest in the second round, due to accidental groin shots.

== Championships and accomplishments ==
- Deep
  - Deep Middleweight Champion (One time)
- Road FC
  - Road FC Middleweight Champion (One time)

== Mixed martial arts record ==
Professional record breakdown
34 matches	24 wins	9 losses
By knockout	12	3
By decision	12	6
No contests	1	

Res.	Record	Opponent	Method	Event	Date	Round	Time	Location	Notes
Loss	24–9 (1)	Hoon Kim	TKO (punches)	Road FC: Road Fighting Championship 40	July 15, 2017	2	2:38	Seoul, South Korea	
Win	24–8 (1)	Nae Chul Kim	Decision (unanimous)	Road FC: Road Fighting Championship 36	February 11, 2017	3	5:00	Seoul, South Korea	
Loss	23–8 (1)	Jung Hwan Cha	KO (punches)	Road FC: Road Fighting Championship 28	January 31, 2016	2	2:36	Seoul, South Korea	Lost the Road FC Middleweight Championship.
Win	23–7 (1)	Uh Jin Jeon	TKO (punches)	Road FC: Road Fighting Championship 24	July 25, 2015	1	2:52	Tokyo, Japan	Won the Road FC Middleweight Championship.
Win	22–7 (1)	Dool Hee Lee	TKO (punches)	Road FC: Road Fighting Championship 22	March 21, 2015	2	3:57	Seoul, South Korea	
NC	21–7 (1)	Dool Hee Lee	No Contest (accidental knee to groin)	Road FC: Road Fighting Championship 19	November 9, 2014	2	N/A	Seoul, South Korea	
Win	21–7	Dong-sik Yoon	TKO (punches)	Road FC: Road Fighting Championship 16	July 26, 2014	1	3:36	Gumi, South Korea	
Win	20–7	Hee Seung Kim	TKO (punches)	Road FC: Korea 1	January 18, 2014	2	2:09	Seoul, South Korea	
Loss	19–7	Brad Tavares	Decision (unanimous)	UFC on Fuel TV: Silva vs. Stann	March 3, 2013	3	5:00	Saitama, Japan	
Win	19–6	Tom DeBlass	Decision (unanimous)	UFC on Fuel TV: Franklin vs. Le	November 10, 2012	3	5:00	Macau, SAR, China	
Loss	18–6	Costas Philippou	Decision (unanimous)	UFC 148	July 7, 2012	3	5:00	Las Vegas, Nevada, United States	
Win	18–5	Steve Cantwell	Decision (unanimous)	UFC 144	February 26, 2012	3	5:00	Saitama, Japan	
Loss	17–5	Nick Ring	Decision (unanimous)	UFC 127	February 27, 2011	3	5:00	Sydney, Australia	Awarded win bonus due to controversial decision from judges.
Win	17–4	Ryuta Sakurai	TKO (knees)	DEEP: 49 Impact	August 27, 2010	2	0:32	Tokyo, Japan	Defended the DEEP Middleweight Championship; vacates title to fight in UFC.
Win	16–4	Hiromitsu Kanehara	Decision (unanimous)	DEEP: 46 Impact	February 28, 2010	3	5:00	Tokyo, Japan	Non-title bout.
Win	15–4	Yuichi Nakanishi	Decision (unanimous)	DEEP: 42 Impact	June 30, 2009	3	5:00	Tokyo, Japan	Won the DEEP Middleweight Championship.
Win	14–4	Murilo Rua	Decision (unanimous)	DREAM 8	April 5, 2009	2	5:00	Nagoya, Japan	Catchweight (196 lb) bout.
Win	13–4	Ryuta Sakurai	TKO (punches)	DEEP: 40 Impact	February 20, 2009	1	0:45	Tokyo, Japan	
Win	12–4	Jason Jones	Decision (unanimous)	Deep: 38 Impact	October 23, 2008	2	5:00	Tokyo, Japan	
Win	11–4	Hiroki Ozaki	Decision (unanimous)	DEEP: 37 Impact	August 17, 2008	2	5:00	Tokyo, Japan	
Loss	10–4	Yuichi Nakanishi	Decision (unanimous)	DEEP: 35 Impact	May 19, 2008	2	5:00	Tokyo, Japan	For the vacant DEEP Middleweight Championship.
Win	10–3	Yuya Shirai	Decision (split)	DEEP: 35 Impact	May 19, 2008	2	5:00	Tokyo, Japan	
Win	9–3	Ryuta Sakurai	Decision (unanimous)	DEEP: 34 Impact	February 22, 2008	3	5:00	Tokyo, Japan	
Loss	8–3	Joey Villaseñor	Decision (split)	EliteXC: Uprising	September 15, 2007	3	5:00	Honolulu, Hawaii, United States	
Win	8–2	Hikaru Sato	TKO (punches)	Pancrase: 2007 Neo-Blood Tournament Finals	July 27, 2007	1	1:09	Tokyo, Japan	
Win	7–2	Chris Gates	TKO (submission to punches)	EliteXC Destiny	February 10, 2007	1	1:18	Southaven, Mississippi, United States	Return to Middleweight.
Win	6–2	Yuji Sakuragi	Decision (unanimous)	Pancrase: 2006 Neo-Blood Tournament Finals	July 28, 2006	2	5:00	Tokyo, Japan	Heavyweight debut.
Win	5–2	Keitaro Maeda	TKO (punches)	GCM: D.O.G. 5	April 4, 2006	1	4:40	Tokyo, Japan	
Loss	4–2	Kozo Urita	KO (punch)	Pancrase: Blow 1	January 26, 2006	1	0:40	Tokyo, Japan	
Win	4–1	Yuta Nakamura	TKO (punches)	Pancrase: Spiral 9	November 4, 2005	1	0:57	Tokyo, Japan	
Win	3–1	Brandon Wolff	TKO (punches)	K-1: World Grand Prix Hawaii	July 29, 2005	2	2:49	Hawaii, United States	Middleweight debut.
Win	2–1	Oleg Bazayev	KO (punches)	GCM: D.O.G. 2	June 11, 2005	1	0:28	Tokyo, Japan	
Win	1–1	Masaya Inoue	Decision (unanimous)	Shooto: 1/29 in Korakuen Hall	January 29, 2005	2	5:00	Tokyo, Japan	
Loss	0–1	Joe Doerksen	Decision (unanimous)	SuperBrawl 35	April 16, 2004	3	5:00	Honolulu, Hawaii, United States	

== See also ==
- List of male mixed martial artists
