= 2001 in Deep =

Mixed martial arts events

Information
- First date: January 8, 2001
- Last date: December 23, 2001

Events
- Total events: 3

Fights
- Total fights: 27

Chronology
2001 in Deep	2002 in Deep

The year 2001 was the first year in the history of Deep, a mixed martial arts promotion based in the Japan. In 2001 Deep held 3 events beginning with, Deep: 1st Impact.

== Events list ==
#	Event title	Date	Arena	Location
3	Deep: 3rd Impact	December 23, 2001	Differ Ariake	Tokyo
2	Deep: 2nd Impact	August 18, 2001	Yokohama Cultural Gymnasium	Yokohama
1	Deep: 1st Impact	January 8, 2001	Aichi Prefectural Gymnasium	Nagoya

== Deep: 1st Impact ==
Deep: 1st Impact was an event held on January 8, 2001 at the Aichi Prefectural Gymnasium in Nagoya, Japan.

=== Results ===
Main Card
Weight class				Method	Round	Time	Notes
	Royler Gracie	def.	Takehiro Murahama	Draw	2	10:00
	Ricardo Liborio	vs.	Ikuhisa Minowa	Draw	3	5:00
	Paulo Filho	def.	Keiichiro Yamamiya	KO (Punches)	2	0:29
	Marcelo Tigre	def.	Katsuhisa Fujii	Submission (Rear Naked Choke)	2	2:27
	Jorge Patino	vs.	Daisuke Ishii	Draw	3	5:00
	Kengo Watanabe	def.	Osamu Kawahara	KO (Punches)	1	0:22
	Ryuki Ueyama	vs.	Kosei Kubota	Draw	3	5:00
	Gia Chiragishvili	vs.	Yoji Anjo	Draw	3	5:00
	Hitoyo Kimura	def.	Valentin Siouljine	Submission (Armbar)	1	1:52

== Deep: 2nd Impact ==
Deep: 2nd Impact was an event held on August 18, 2001 at the Yokohama Cultural Gymnasium in Yokohama, Japan.

=== Results ===
Main Card
Weight class				Method	Round	Time	Notes
	Paulo Filho	def.	Yuki Kondo	Decision (Unanimous)	3	5:00
	João Roque	def.	Takehiro Murahama	Submission (Armbar)	1	4:29
	Sanae Kikuta	def.	Pshemek Wallace	TKO (Punches)	1	1:52
	Antônio Rogério Nogueira	def.	Katsuhisa Fujii	Technical Submission (Armbar)	1	3:59
	Wataru Sakata	def.	Adrian Serrano	TKO (Eye Injury)	1	5:00
	Akihiro Gono	vs.	Dustin Denes	Draw	3	5:00
	Dos Caras, Jr.	def.	Kengo Watanabe	TKO (Broken Arm)	1	0:50
	Ryuki Ueyama	vs.	Kosei Kubota	Draw	3	5:00
	Kazuki Okubo	def.	Kato Kung Lee Sr.	Submission (Armbar)	1	3:05

== Deep: 3rd Impact ==
Deep: 3rd Impact was an event held on December 23, 2001 at the Differ Ariake in Tokyo, Japan.

=== Results ===
Main Card
Weight class				Method	Round	Time	Notes
	Takehiro Murahama	def.	Victor Rabanales	Submission (Kneebar)	1	0:40
	Rambaa Somdet	def.	Takumi Yano	Decision (Unanimous)	3	5:00
	Felipe Estrada	def.	Osamu Kawahara	TKO (Punches)	1	4:55
	Wataru Sakata	def.	Kosei Kubota	TKO (Punches)	1	4:05
	Ryuki Ueyama	def.	LaVerne Clark	TKO (Corner Stoppage)	1	5:00
	Ikuhisa Minowa	def.	Kazuki Okubo	Submission (Armbar)	1	3:38
	Ryo Chonan	def.	Takaku Fuke	Decision (Unanimous)	3	5:00
	Koji Oishi	def.	Takaharu Murahama	Decision (Majority)	3	5:00
	Shinya Sato	def.	Wataru Miki	Submission (Armbar)	2	3:28

== See also ==
- Deep
- List of Deep champions
- List of Deep events
