= 2010 in Deep =

Mixed martial arts events

Information
- First date: January 24, 2010
- Last date: December 19, 2010

Events
- Total events: 18

Fights
- Total fights: 224
- Title fights: 6

Chronology
2009 in Deep	2010 in Deep	2011 in Deep

The year 2010 was the 10th year in the history of Deep, a mixed martial arts promotion based in Japan. In 2010 Deep held 18 events beginning with, Deep: 45 Impact.

== Title fights ==
Title fights in 2010
Weight class				Method	Round	Time	Event	Notes
Welterweight	Yuya Shirai	def.	Seichi Ikemoto (c)	Decision (Unanimous)	3	5:00	Deep: 45 Impact	(Note: For the Deep Welterweight Championship.)
Light Heavyweight	Yoshiyuki Nakanishi	def.	Ryuta Noji	Decision (Unanimous)	2	5:00	Deep: 47 Impact	(Note: For the Deep Light Heavyweight Championship.)
Featherweight	Koichiro Matsumoto	def.	Takafumi Otsuka (c)	Decision (Split)	3	5:00	Deep: 48 Impact	(Note: For the Deep Featherweight Championship.)
Bantamweight	Masakazu Imanari (c)	def.	Tomoya Miyashita	Decision (Unanimous)	3	5:00	Deep: 49 Impact	(Note: For the Deep Bantamweight Championship.)
Middleweight	Riki Fukuda (c)	def.	Ryuta Sakurai	TKO (Knees)	2	0:32	Deep: 49 Impact	(Note: For the Deep Middleweight Championship.)
Lightweight	Katsunori Kikuno	def.	Nobuhiro Obiya	Decision (Split)	3	5:00	Deep: 50 Impact	(Note: For the Deep Lightweight Championship.)

== Events list ==
#	Event title	Date	Arena	Location
136	Deep: Kobudo Fight Future Challenge 9	December 19, 2010	Kobudo Martial Arts Communication Space, Tiger Hall	Nagoya
135	Deep: 51 Impact	December 11, 2010	Differ Ariake	Tokyo
134	Deep: Future King Tournament 2010	December 11, 2010	Differ Ariake	Tokyo
133	Deep: 50 Impact	October 24, 2010	JCB Hall	Tokyo
132	Deep: Cage Impact 2010 in Hamamatsu	September 19, 2010	Act City	Hamamatsu
131	Deep: clubDeep Nagoya: Kobudo Fight	September 5, 2010	Asunal Kanayama Hall	Nagoya
130	Deep: 49 Impact	August 27, 2010	Korakuen Hall	Tokyo
129	Deep: clubDeep Hachioji 2	August 1, 2010	Keio Plaza Hotel	Tokyo
128	Deep: Cage Impact in Nagoya	July 11, 2010	Zepp Nagoya	Nagoya
127	Deep: 48 Impact	July 3, 2010	Differ Ariake	Tokyo
126	Deep: Cage Impact 2010 in Osaka	June 6, 2010	Zepp Osaka	Osaka
125	Deep: clubDeep Tokyo in Shinkiba 1st Ring	May 23, 2010	Shinkiba 1st Ring	Tokyo
124	Deep: clubDeep Toyama: Barbarian Festival 8	May 16, 2010	Toyama Event Plaza	Toyama
123	Deep: 47 Impact	April 17, 2010	Korakuen Hall	Tokyo
122	Deep: Kobudo Fight 9	April 11, 2010	Asunal Kanayama Hall	Nagoya
121	Deep: clubDeep Tokyo in Shinjuku	March 28, 2010	Pink Big Pig	Tokyo
120	Deep: 46 Impact	February 28, 2010	Korakuen Hall	Tokyo
119	Deep: 45 Impact	January 24, 2010	Zepp Osaka	Osaka

== Deep: 45 Impact ==
Deep: 45 Impact was an event held on January 24, 2010, at Zepp Osaka in Osaka.

=== Results ===
Main Card
Weight class				Method	Round	Time	Notes
Welterweight	Yuya Shirai	def.	Seichi Ikemoto (c)	Decision (Unanimous)	3	5:00	(Note: For the Deep Welterweight Championship.)
	Seigo Mizuguchi	def.	Ryota Kitamura	Submission (Armbar)	1
	Jutaro Nakao	def.	Yuki Ito	Decision (Unanimous)	3	5:00
	Tomomi Iwama	def.	Makoto Kamaya	Decision (Unanimous)	2	5:00
	Rikuhei Fujii	def.	Young Choi	Decision (Unanimous)	2	5:00
	Tatsunao Nagakura	def.	Yusuke Kagiyama	KO (Punch)	1	3:28
	Yasuaki Kishimoto	def.	Akihiko Mori	Decision (Unanimous)	2	5:00
	Koji Nakamura	vs.	Shinichiro Tanaka	Draw	2	5:00
	Yusaku Nakamura	def.	Hiroto Hattori	TKO (Punches)	1	4:21
	Sho Nonaka	def.	Keita Yoshikawa	Submission (Heel Hook)	1	2:45
	Hiroshi Tomita	def.	Yuji Sato	TKO (Punches)	2	4:21

== Deep: 46 Impact ==
Deep: 46 Impact was an event held on February 28, 2010, at Korakuen Hall in Tokyo.

=== Results ===
Main Card
Weight class				Method	Round	Time	Notes
	Takafumi Otsuka	def.	Takeshi Yamazaki	Decision (Unanimous)	3	5:00
	Riki Fukuda	def.	Hiromitsu Kanehara	Decision (Unanimous)	3	5:00
	Ryuta Noji	def.	Katsuhisa Fujii	TKO (Punches)	1	3:18
	Shunsuke Inoue	def.	Minoru Kato	Decision (Unanimous)	2	5:00
	Christian M'Pumbu	def.	Yuji Sakuragi	TKO (Punches)	1	2:29
	Yoshiyuki Nakanishi	def.	Tomoaki Hata	Submission (Keylock)	1	4:30
	Yoshihiro Tomioka	def.	Toshiaki Kitada	Decision (Majority)	2	5:00
	Taisuke Okuno	def.	Hidehiko Hasegawa	TKO (Punches)	1	4:09
	Shigetoshi Iwase	def.	Eiji Ishikawa	Submission (Anaconda Choke)	1	2:07
	Isao Terada	def.	Hiroshi Nakamura	TKO (Punches)	1	1:11
	Yoshiki Harada	def.	Takashige Hirukawa	TKO (Punches)	1	2:33
	Yuta Watanabe	def.	Yasushi Kitazaki	Decision (Unanimous)	2	5:00
	Hiroyuki Kobayashi	def.	Takashi Masuda	TKO (Punches)	1	3:15

== Deep: clubDeep Tokyo in Shinjuku ==
Deep: clubDeep Tokyo in Shinjuku was an event held on March 28, 2010, at The Pink Big Pig in Tokyo.

=== Results ===
Main Card
Weight class				Method	Round	Time	Notes
	Takeshi Numajiri	def.	Makoto Kamaya	Submission (Anaconda Choke)	1	0:34
	Tsuyoshi Kurihara	def.	Jury Night King	Submission (Kneebar)	1	0:58
	Yoshitaka Ebina	vs.	Gantaro Gantaro	Draw	2	5:00
	Juri Ohara	def.	Jun Ando	TKO (Punches)	1	4:22
	Chiaki Wakana	def.	Tatsuya Tsuchida	KO (Punches)	1	0:14
	Satoshi Shinbori	def.	Chikara Shimabukuro	Submission (Rear-Naked Choke)	1	3:16
	Toshikatsu Harada	def.	Shitoku Takanashi	Submission (Rear-Naked Choke)	1	1:11

== Deep: Kobudo Fight 9 ==
Deep: Kobudo Fight 9 was an event held on April 11, 2010, at Asunal Kanayama Hall in Nagoya.

=== Results ===
Main Card
Weight class				Method	Round	Time	Notes
	Yasuaki Kishimoto	def.	Takahiro Kajita	Submission (Rear-Naked Choke)	2	4:57
	Yusuke Kagiyama	def.	Kenichi Hattori	Decision (Majority)	2	5:00
	Hiroshi Sato	def.	Naoyuki Kato	Decision (Unanimous)	2	5:00
	Yutaka Umeya	def.	Kunihiro Watanabe	TKO (Punches)	1	2:59
	Takeshi Kasugai	def.	Hiroshi Sakamoto	Submission (Rear-Naked Choke)	2	4:00
	Alan Yoshihiro Yamaniwa	def.	Keita Yoshikawa	Decision (Unanimous)	2	5:00
	Naoki Kawai	def.	Akihisa Iwai	Submission (Armbar)	1	0:23
	Yusuke Tsunoda	def.	Hidenori Urayama	Submission (Heel Hook)	2	0:27

== Deep: 47 Impact ==
Deep: 47 Impact was an event held on April 17, 2010, at Korakuen Hall in Tokyo.

=== Results ===
Main Card
Weight class				Method	Round	Time	Notes
Light Heavyweight	Yoshiyuki Nakanishi	def.	Ryuta Noji	Decision (Unanimous)	2	5:00	(Note: For the Deep Light Heavyweight Championship.)
	Masakazu Imanari	def.	Isao Terada	Submission (Armbar)	3	0:27
	Ryuki Ueyama	vs.	Hidetaka Monma	Draw	3	5:00
	Tomoya Miyashita	def.	Darren Uyenoyama	Submission (Guillotine Choke)	2	1:10
	Kazuhisa Tazawa	def.	Roque Martinez	Submission (Achilles Lock)	2	2:11
	Bernard Ackah	def.	Minoru Kato	Decision (Unanimous)	2	5:00
	Ryuta Noji	def.	Shunsuke Inoue	Decision (Unanimous)	2	5:00
	Yoshiyuki Nakanishi	def.	Christian M'Pumbu	Decision (Split)	2	5:00
	Hirohide Fujinuma	def.	Yoichi Babaguchi	TKO (Punches)	1	0:17
	Yasuhiro Kawasaki	def.	Tomoya Kato	DQ (Accidental Kicks to the Groin)	2	0:00
	Yusaku Tsukumo	vs.	Yoshitomo Watanabe	Draw	2	5:00
	Akimitsu Tsuchiya	def.	Shawn Dean	TKO (Punches)	1	4:14

== Deep: clubDeep Toyama: Barbarian Festival 8 ==
Deep: clubDeep Toyama: Barbarian Festival 8 was an event held on May 16, 2010, at Toyama Event Plaza in Toyama.

=== Results ===
Main Card
Weight class				Method	Round	Time	Notes
	Koichiro Matsumoto	def.	Yoshihiro Tomioka	KO (Punches)	1	1:29
	Yuichi Ikari	def.	Yuya Osugi	TKO (Punches)	1	3:58
	Satoshi Watanabe	vs.	Alan Yoshihiro Yamaniwa	Draw	2	5:00
	Yasuo Munakata	def.	Hirotaka Himeno	TKO (Punches)	2	4:00
	Sakura Nomura	def.	Rina Tomita	Decision (Unanimous)	2	5:00
	Hiroshi Sato	vs.	Hiroyuki Tsuzuki	Draw	2	5:00
	Yoshinobu Kawamura	def.	Daisuke Kanehira	Decision (Unanimous)	2	5:00
	Jun Osawa	def.	Akihiro Hasegawa	TKO (Punches)	1	2:44
	Gen Ikeda	def.	Kaname Mori	Submission (Triangle Choke)	2	3:59
	Harushige Shinokawa	def.	Daiki Nakahara	TKO (Punches)	1	0:55
	Ippei Takase	def.	Toru Matsushita	TKO (Punches)	1	2:21
	Daigo Sawada	def.	Oya Takato	TKO (Punches)	2	1:14

== Deep: clubDeep Tokyo in Shinkiba 1st Ring ==
Deep: clubDeep Tokyo in Shinkiba 1st Ring was an event held on May 23, 2010, at Shinkiba 1st Ring in Tokyo.

=== Results ===
Main Card
Weight class				Method	Round	Time	Notes
	Hiroki Sato	vs.	Shuji Morikawa	Draw	2	5:00
	Tomohiko Hori	def.	Akira Kibe	TKO (Punches)	2	4:23
	Yutaka Ueda	def.	Mitsuru Yamaguchi	Submission (Straight Armbar)	1	0:25
	Tatsumitsu Wada	def.	Tatsuhito Satsuma	Decision (Unanimous)	2	5:00
	Juri Ohara	def.	Hidenobu Koike	TKO (Punches)	1	3:15
	Shota Utsunomiya	def.	Muneyuki Sato	Decision (Unanimous)	2	5:00
	Noboru Onishi	def.	Yoichi Ozawa	TKO (Punches)	1	3:05
	Shota Shimeya	def.	Yu Yu	Submission (Armbar)	1	4:38
	Hiroyuki Kobayashi	def.	Tatsuya Tsuchida	Submission (Rear-Naked Choke)	1	1:15
	Masato Kataoka	def.	Takuya Inoue	TKO (Punches)	1	0:15

== Deep: Cage Impact 2010 in Osaka ==
Deep: Cage Impact 2010 in Osaka was an event held on June 6, 2010, at Zepp Osaka in Osaka.

=== Results ===
Main Card
Weight class				Method	Round	Time	Notes
	Seichi Ikemoto	def.	Naoki Matsushita	Decision (Majority)	3	5:00
	Young Choi	def.	Katsuyori Shibata	Decision (Unanimous)	3	5:00
	Yasuaki Kishimoto	def.	Un Sik Song	Decision (Unanimous)	2	5:00
	Yusaku Nakamura	def.	Yuichiro Shirai	KO (Punch)	1	2:55
	Ryosuke Komori	def.	Nobuhiro Yoshitake	Submission (Heel Hook)	1	0:24
	Koji Nakamura	vs.	Taro Kusano	Draw	2	5:00
	Yusuke Kagiyama	def.	Doo Ho Choi	Decision (Split)	2	5:00
	Sho Nonaka	vs.	Naoyuki Kato	Draw	2	5:00

== Deep: 48 Impact ==
Deep: 48 Impact was an event held on July 3, 2010, at Differ Ariake in Tokyo.

=== Results ===
Main Card
Weight class				Method	Round	Time	Notes
Featherweight	Koichiro Matsumoto	def.	Takafumi Otsuka (c)	Decision (Split)	3	5:00	(Note: For the Deep Featherweight Championship.)
	Ryuki Ueyama	vs.	Won Sik Park	NC (Knee to Downed Opponent)	1	4:16
	Kazuhisa Tazawa	def.	Seigo Mizuguchi	TKO (Punches)	1	0:49
	Shigetoshi Iwase	def.	Dong Hyun Kim	Decision (Unanimous)	2	5:00
	Eiji Ishikawa	def.	A-Sol Kwon	Decision (Unanimous)	2	5:00
	Hiroshi Nakamura	def.	Tomohiko Hori	Decision (Unanimous)	2	5:00
	Tatsunao Nagakura	def.	Tomoya Kato	DQ (Accidental Kicks to the Groin)	1	4:41
	Yoshiki Harada	def.	Masato Kobayashi	Decision (Unanimous)	2	5:00
	Kosuke Umeda	def.	Sadao Kondo	Decision (Unanimous)	2	5:00
	Yutaka Ueda	def.	Ji Yong Ahn	Decision (Unanimous)	2	5:00
	Young Bok Kil	def.	Masato Kataoka	TKO (Punches)	1	4:36

== Deep: Cage Impact in Nagoya ==
Deep: Cage Impact in Nagoya was an event held on July 11, 2010, at Zepp Nagoya in Nagoya.

=== Results ===
Main Card
Weight class				Method	Round	Time	Notes
	Luiz Andrade I	def.	Atsuhiro Tsuboi	Decision (Unanimous)	2	5:00
	Shunsuke Inoue	def.	Yusuke Masuda	Decision (Split)	2	5:00
	Naoki Matsushita	def.	Yuya Osugi	TKO (Punches)	1	2:58
	Takahiro Kajita	def.	Tristan Connelly	Decision (Unanimous)	2	5:00
	Akira Kibe	def.	Satoshi Watanabe	Decision (Unanimous)	2	5:00
	Seiji Akao	def.	Tatsuhito Satsuma	Decision (Unanimous)	2	5:00
	Takeshi Kasugai	def.	Naoyuki Kato	Decision (Unanimous)	2	5:00
	Shinichiro Tanaka	def.	Yusuke Tsunoda	TKO (Punches)	1	3:45
	Alan Yoshihiro Yamaniwa	def.	Jun Kito	Decision (Unanimous)	2	5:00
	Fumitoshi Ishikawa	def.	Yoshitsune Ito	Submission (Armbar)	1	3:51
	Hiroshi Sato	def.	Naoki Kawai	Decision (Unanimous)	2	5:00
	Yasutomo Katsuki	def.	Kenichi Kinoshita	Submission (Rear-Naked Choke)	1	4:34
	Katsuya Ishida	def.	Akihisa Iwai	TKO (Punches)	2	1:39
	Noriyuki Takeuchi	def.	Shota Watanabe	Submission (Achilles Lock)	1	0:58

== Deep: clubDeep Hachioji 2 ==
Deep: clubDeep Hachioji 2 was an event held on August 1, 2010, at Keio Plaza Hotel in Tokyo.

=== Results ===
Main Card
Weight class				Method	Round	Time	Notes
	Ayumu Shioda	def.	Satoshi Shinbori	Decision (Majority)	2	5:00
	Takuya Inoue	vs.	Shunsuke Tanaka	Draw	2	5:00
	Jun Ando	vs.	Isamu Nagase	Draw	2	5:00
	Kenjiro Takahashi	def.	Takatoshi Matsumoto	TKO (Punches)	2	1:54
	Naoki Tajima	def.	Kota Ishibashi	Decision (Unanimous)	2	5:00
	Chiaki Wakana	def.	Takuma Matsuyama	TKO (Punches)	2	2:20
	Takeo Shiina	def.	Mitsusaburo Mitsusaburo	KO (Punch)	1	2:02
	Takashi Ito	def.	Motoki Awaji	Submission (Straight Armbar)	1	1:13
	Chikara Shimabukuro	def.	Yu Suda	Decision (Unanimous)	2	5:00

== Deep: 49 Impact ==
Deep: 49 Impact was an event held on August 27, 2010, at Korakuen Hall in Tokyo.

=== Results ===
Main Card
Weight class				Method	Round	Time	Notes
Bantamweight	Masakazu Imanari (c)	def.	Tomoya Miyashita	Decision (Unanimous)	3	5:00	(Note: For the Deep Bantamweight Championship.)
Middleweight	Riki Fukuda (c)	def.	Ryuta Sakurai	TKO (Knees)	2	0:32	(Note: For the Deep Middleweight Championship.)
	Hiromitsu Kanehara	vs.	Young Choi	Draw	2	5:00
	Rikuhei Fujii	def.	Hiroki Sato	TKO (Punches)	1	3:52
	Yoshitomo Watanabe	def.	Dong Hyun Kim	Decision (Unanimous)	2	5:00
	Yasuaki Kishimoto	def.	Yuki Ito	Decision (Unanimous)	2	5:00
	Seiji Akao	def.	Ryosuke Komori	Decision (Unanimous)	2	5:00
	Tatsumitsu Wada	def.	Masato Kobayashi	Submission (Rear-Naked Choke)	1	4:08
	Hirotaka Miyakawa	def.	Takeshi Kasugai	TKO (Punches)	1	4:49
	Katsunori Tsuda	def.	Brent Fryia	TKO (Punches)	1	4:28
	Takeshi Numajiri	def.	Hiroyuki Kobayashi	Decision (Unanimous)	2	5:00
	Komei Sugawara	def.	Kazumasa Sugawara	Submission (Rear-Naked Choke)	1	3:51

== Deep: clubDeep Nagoya: Kobudo Fight ==
Deep: clubDeep Nagoya: Kobudo Fight was an event held on September 5, 2010, at Asunal Kanayama Hall in Nagoya.

=== Results ===
Main Card
Weight class				Method	Round	Time	Notes
	Naoki Matsushita	vs.	Koji Nakamura	Draw	2	5:00
	Choi Doo-ho	def.	Atsuhiro Tsuboi	TKO (Punches)	1	4:53
	Akira Kibe	def.	Sho Nonaka	TKO (Punches)	1	2:53
	Taro Kusano	def.	Shinichiro Tanaka	Decision (Unanimous)	2	5:00
	Alan Yoshihiro Yamaniwa	def.	Takao Nakajima	Decision (Majority)	2	5:00
	Katsuya Ishida	def.	Atsushi Sasage	Decision (Unanimous)	2	5:00
	Yoshiaki Tamazawa	def.	Satoshi Shimono	Submission (Achilles Lock)	1	0:34
	Kenichi Kinoshita	def.	Seita Yabe	TKO (Punches)	2	2:30

== Deep: Cage Impact 2010 in Hamamatsu ==
Deep: Cage Impact 2010 in Hamamatsu was an event held on September 19, 2010, at Act City in Hamamatsu.

=== Results ===
Main Card
Weight class				Method	Round	Time	Notes
	Daijiro Matsui	def.	Tomoaki Hata	Decision (Unanimous)	2	5:00
	Kenichi Hattori	def.	Henri Kakiuchi	TKO (Punches)	1	3:43
	Hideki Sekine	def.	Makoto Kato	Submission (Armbar)	1	1:37
	Kleber Koike Erbst	vs.	Mitsuru Yamaguchi	Draw	2	5:00
	Hiroyuki Tsuzuki	def.	Yujiro Sekiya	Decision (Unanimous)	2	5:00
	Ryota Matsui	def.	Kunihiro Watanabe	Decision (Unanimous)	2	5:00
	Shun Yagi	def.	Manabu Atsumi	TKO (Punches)	1	0:36
	Yusaku Fujisawa	def.	Jacob Ito Ortiz	Submission (Rear-Naked Choke)	1	2:29
	Takahiro Ito	def.	Tatsuya Masuda	Submission (Armbar)	2	1:08
	Akiyoshi Yamada	def.	Bob Bob	TKO (Punches)	2	2:33
	Tsuyoshi Ito	def.	Shinsuke Takeda	Submission (Rear-Naked Choke)	1	4:35
	Hiroyuki Nagai	def.	Koji Nakanishi	Submission (Kimura)	1	2:39

== Deep: 50 Impact ==
Deep: 50 Impact was an event held on October 24, 2010, at JCB Hall in Tokyo.

=== Results ===
Main Card
Weight class				Method	Round	Time	Notes
Lightweight	Katsunori Kikuno	def.	Nobuhiro Obiya	Decision (Split)	3	5:00	(Note: For the Deep Lightweight Championship.)
	Yuya Shirai	def.	Shigetoshi Iwase	Decision (Unanimous)	3	5:00
	Masakazu Imanari	def.	Daiki Hata	Decision (Majority)	3	5:00
	Shinya Aoki	def.	Yokthai Sithoar	Submission (Keylock)	1	1:00
	Sanae Kikuta	def.	Yi Sak Kim	TKO (Corner Stoppage)	1	1:21
	Ikuhisa Minowa	def.	Chang Hee Kim	Submission (Scarf Hold Armlock)	1	2:07
	Ryo Chonan	def.	Jun-Hee Moon	TKO (Punches)	3	2:57
	Yoshiro Maeda	def.	Takafumi Otsuka	Decision (Majority)	3	5:00
	Yoshiyuki Nakanishi	def.	Katsuyori Shibata	TKO (Punches)	1	4:06
	Shoji Maruyama	def.	Jin Suk Jung	TKO (Punches)	1	2:58
	Hidetaka Monma	def.	Yoshihisa Yamamoto	Submission (Arm-Triangle Choke)	1	1:07
	Ryuta Noji	def.	Hiroshi Nagao	TKO (Knees)	1	1:33
	Hiroshi Nakamura	def.	Tatsumitsu Wada	Decision (Unanimous)	2	5:00
	Yusaku Nakamura	def.	Isao Terada	KO (Punch)	2	3:48
	Takahiro Ashida	def.	Shun Fukazawa	TKO (Punches)	2	1:49
	Kazumasa Sugawara	def.	Yoshihiro Sasaki	TKO (Punches)	1	2:27

== Deep: Future King Tournament 2010 ==
Deep: Future King Tournament 2010 was an event held on December 11, 2010, at Differ Ariake in Tokyo.

=== Results ===
Main Card
Weight class				Method	Round	Time	Notes
	Hideto Kondo	def.	Yoshinori Takahashi	Decision (Unanimous)	2	5:00
	Yoshifumi Nakamura	def.	Yuhi Takemoto	Decision (Unanimous)	2	5:00
	Satoru Enomoto	def.	Yusuke Kitago	Decision (Unanimous)	2	5:00
	Takahiro Kawanaka	def.	Naoki Kokubu	Submission (Anaconda Choke)	1	0:00
	Yoshinori Takahashi	def.	Isamu Nagase	Decision (Unanimous)	1	5:00
	Hideto Kondo	def.	Nobuhito Sakurada	Technical Submission (Kimura)	1	4:50
	Seita Katsuki	def.	Manabu Hirayama	Decision (Unanimous)	1	5:00
	Masahito Hisataka	def.	Yusaku Fujisawa	Decision (Unanimous)	1	5:00
	Yoshifumi Nakamura	def.	Toshinori Tsunemura	Decision (Unanimous)	1	5:00
	Yuhi Takemoto	def.	Kazuyoshi Kiyama	Decision (Unanimous)	1	5:00
	Satoru Enomoto	def.	Yasuo Munakata	Submission (Rear-Naked Choke)	1	3:39
	Yusuke Kitago	def.	Yuki Baba	Decision (Unanimous)	1	5:00
	Naoki Kokubu	def.	Taegi Cho	Decision (Unanimous)	1	5:00
	Takahiro Kawanaka	def.	Marius Florin Varlan	Decision (Split)	1	5:00
	Isamu Nagase	def.	Katsuyoshi Beppu	Decision (Unanimous)	1	5:00
	Yoshinori Takahashi	def.	Yuji Fukawa	Decision (Unanimous)	1	5:00
	Nobuhito Sakurada	def.	Kazuki Nomoto	Decision (Unanimous)	1	5:00
	Hideto Kondo	def.	Shogo Ohashi	Decision (Unanimous)	1	5:00
	Seita Katsuki	def.	Yu Kijima	DQ (Accidental Kick to the Groin)	1	0:00
	Manabu Hirayama	def.	Kohei Tokeshi	Decision (Split)	1	5:00
	Masahito Hisataka	def.	Kenjiro Takahashi	Decision (Split)	1	5:00
	Yusaku Fujisawa	def.	Komei Sugawara	Decision (Unanimous)	1	5:00
	Toshinori Tsunemura	def.	Tomoyuki Shimoyama	Submission (Heel Hook)	1	0:27
	Yoshifumi Nakamura	def.	Takanori Takahashi	Decision (Unanimous)	1	5:00
	Yuhi Takemoto	def.	Yoshihisa Tsuenaga	Decision (Split)	1	5:00
	Kazuyoshi Kiyama	def.	Yasufumi Suzaki	Decision (Unanimous)	1	5:00
	Yasuo Munakata	def.	Takuya Inoue	Decision (Unanimous)	1	5:00
	Satoru Enomoto	def.	Takuma Matsuyama	Submission (Rear-Naked Choke)	1	1:43
	Yusuke Kitago	def.	Hiroshi Sato	KO (Punch)	1	2:25
	Yuki Baba	def.	Kenta Sakuma	Decision (Unanimous)	1	5:00
	Isamu Nagase	def.	Noboru Ota	TKO (Punches)	1	3:19
	Yoshinori Takahashi	def.	Shinichiro Arai	Technical Submission (Rear-Naked Choke)	1	1:13
	Kazuki Nomoto	def.	Akimitsu Tsuchiya	Decision (Unanimous)	1	5:00
	Hideto Kondo	def.	Fumiya Hashimoto	TKO (Punches)	1	0:15
	Yusaku Fujisawa	def.	Toshinari Nakamura	Decision (Unanimous)	1	5:00
	Takanori Takahashi	def.	Masashi Haga	Decision (Unanimous)	1	5:00
	Kazuyoshi Kiyama	def.	Shun Fukazawa	Decision (Unanimous)	1	5:00
	Yasuo Munakata	def.	Gaku Suwazono	Decision (Split)	1	5:00
	Yusuke Kitago	def.	Sota Kojima	Decision (Unanimous)	1	5:00
	Yuki Baba	def.	Hideki Kiyota	Decision (Unanimous)	1	5:00
	Kenta Sakuma	def.	Kenichi Ogura	Decision (Unanimous)	1	5:00

== Deep: 51 Impact ==
Deep: 51 Impact was an event held on December 11, 2010, at Differ Ariake in Tokyo.

=== Results ===
Main Card
Weight class				Method	Round	Time	Notes
	Koichiro Matsumoto	def.	Shoji Maruyama	TKO (Punches)	3	1:49
	Takafumi Otsuka	def.	Tomohiko Hori	Decision (Unanimous)	3	5:00
	Daisuke Nakamura	def.	Toshikazu Iseno	Submission (Flying Armbar)	2	1:54
	Hideki Sekine	def.	Seigo Mizuguchi	TKO (Punches)	2	2:38
	Yoshitomo Watanabe	def.	Hidehiko Hasegawa	TKO (Punches)	1	2:48
	Hiromitsu Kanehara	def.	Hiroki Sato	Decision (Unanimous)	2	5:00
	Tatsumitsu Wada	def.	Takeshi Numajiri	TKO (Punches)	2	2:43
	Yasuaki Kishimoto	def.	Kosuke Umeda	Technical Submission (Triangle Choke)	1	1:30
	Tomoya Kato	def.	Isamu Sugiuchi	TKO (Punches)	1	0:22
	Yusaku Tsukumo	def.	Yuta Watanabe	Decision (Majority)	2	5:00
	Henrique Shigemoto	def.	Nobuo Odakura	KO (Punches)	1	1:31
	Yasuhiro Kawasaki	def.	Yuki Ito	Decision (Unanimous)	2	5:00
	Sadao Kondo	def.	Juri Ohara	Decision (Unanimous)	2	5:00
	Katsunori Tsuda	def.	Yusuke Kagiyama	Decision (Unanimous)	2	5:00
	Makoto Kamaya	def.	Shunsuke Tanaka	Submission (Guillotine Choke)	1	3:35
	Hiroyuki Kobayashi	vs.	Yuki Uejima	Draw	2	5:00

== Deep: Kobudo Fight Future Challenge 9 ==
Deep: Kobudo Fight Future Challenge 9 was an event held on December 19, 2010, at Kobudo Martial Arts Communication Space, Tiger Hall in Nagoya.

=== Results ===
Main Card
Weight class				Method	Round	Time	Notes
	Kazuo Kimura	def.	Yoshinobu Kawamura	Submission (Armbar)	1	3:16
	Takashi Fujii	def.	Jun Osawa	TKO (Punches)	2	1:21
	Harushige Shinokawa	def.	Tsuyoshi Ito	KO (Punches)	1	1:18
	Kenichi Kinoshita	def.	Taiki Hamasaki	Decision (Unanimous)	2	5:00

== See also ==
- List of Deep champions
- List of Deep events
