= 2004 in Deep =

Mixed martial arts events

Information
- First date: January 22, 2004
- Last date: December 18, 2004

Events
- Total events: 9

Fights
- Total fights: 125
- Title fights: 2

Chronology
2003 in Deep	2004 in Deep	2005 in Deep

The year 2004 was the fourth year in the history of Deep, a mixed martial arts promotion based in Japan. In 2004, Deep held 9 events, beginning with Deep: 13th Impact.

== Title fights ==
Title fights in 2004
Weight class				Method	Round	Time	Event	Notes
Welterweight	Jutaro Nakao	def.	Daisuke Nakamura	TKO (Punches)	3	3:16	Deep: 16th Impact	(Note: For the Deep Welterweight Championship.)
Middleweight	Ryuta Sakurai	def.	Ryuki Ueyama (c)	TKO (Punches)	1	2:40	Deep: 17th Impact	(Note: For the Deep Middleweight Championship.)

== Events list ==
#	Event title	Date	Arena	Location
26	Deep: 17th Impact	December 18, 2004	Differ Ariake	Tokyo
25	Deep: clubDeep Osaka	November 28, 2004	Delfin Arena	Osaka
24	Deep: 16th Impact	October 30, 2004	Korakuen Hall	Tokyo
23	Deep: clubDeep Toyama: Barbarian Festival 1	October 24, 2004	Toyama Event Plaza	Toyama
22	Deep: Chonan Festival	October 3, 2004	Mikawa Town Gymnasium	Mikawa
21	Deep: 15th Impact	July 3, 2004	Differ Ariake	Tokyo
20	Deep: 14th Impact	April 18, 2004	Umeda Stella Hall	Osaka
19	Deep: clubDeep Fukuoka: Team Roken Festival	March 20, 2004	TNC Broadcast Paveria Hall	Fukuoka
18	Deep: 13th Impact	January 22, 2004		Tokyo

== Deep: 13th Impact ==
Deep: 13th Impact was an event held on January 22, 2004, in Tokyo.

=== Results ===
Main Card
Weight class				Method	Round	Time	Notes
	Ryo Chonan	def.	Daijiro Matsui	Decision (Majority)	3	5:00
	Yasuhito Namekawa	def.	Yusuke Imamura	TKO (Punches)	2	3:22
	Hidetaka Monma	def.	Seichi Ikemoto	Submission (Arm-Triangle Choke)	2	3:53
	Satoko Shinashi	def.	Naoko Omuro	Decision (Unanimous)	2	5:00
	Ryuta Sakurai	def.	Tetsuya Onose	KO (Punches)	1	0:56
	Kyosuke Sasaki	def.	Yoshinori Kawakami	Technical Submission (Armbar)	2	3:04
	Jun Ishii	def.	Tadahiro Hosaka	Decision (Unanimous)	3	5:00
	Tashiro Nishiuchi	def.	Tomoyuki Fukami	Decision (Unanimous)	2	5:00
	Masutatsu Yano	vs.	Takahiro Oba	Draw	2	5:00
	Ryuhei Sato	def.	Hiroshi Kozakai	Submission (Armbar)	1	1:18
	Tomonori Taniguchi	vs.	Takumi Murata	Draw	2	5:00
	Aya Koyama	def.	Aiko Oshino	Submission (Armbar)	2	1:08

== Deep: clubDeep Fukuoka: Team Roken Festival ==
Deep: clubDeep Fukuoka: Team Roken Festival was an event held on March 20, 2004, at The TNC Broadcast Paveria Hall in Fukuoka, Tokyo.

=== Results ===
Main Card
Weight class				Method	Round	Time	Notes
	Satoko Shinashi	def.	Yuki Furutachi	Submission (Armbar)	1	1:28
	Akihiko Mori	def.	Kaze Kaze	TKO (Punches)	1	3:01
	Akira Yasumura	def.	Yoshitaka Ideta	TKO (Punches)	1	1:49
	Chikara Sato	def.	Yano Rider	Submission (Toe Hold)	1	2:53
	Yuta Nakamura	def.	Kazutaka Takeshima	TKO (Punches)	2	2:44
	Masaki Sakurazawa	def.	Taishi Ikeda	Submission (Flying Armbar)	1	4:13
	Koji Maruyama	vs.	Yusuke Horimoto	Draw	2	5:00
	Akitoshi Mori	def.	Mitsuya Kishimoto	Submission (Armbar)	1	3:12
	Hirotaka Uehara	def.	Tomohoro Otsuyama	TKO (Punches)	1	3:27
	Takahiro Sonoda	def.	Yasushi Nagata	TKO (Strikes)	1	1:30
	Hidehiko Hasegawa	vs.	Tetsuji Chikada	Draw	2	5:00
	Osamu Furuno	vs.	Taro Aso	Draw	2	5:00
	Hayato Minami	def.	Nobuhiro Yoshitake	Submission (Armbar)	1	2:19
	Kazuya Satomoto	def.	Motohiro Takenawa	Submission (Armbar)	1	2:02

== Deep: 14th Impact ==
Deep: 14th Impact was an event held on April 18, 2004, at The Umeda Stella Hall in Osaka.

=== Results ===
Main Card
Weight class				Method	Round	Time	Notes
	Dokonjonosuke Mishima	def.	Robert Emerson	Decision (Unanimous)	3	5:00
	Yoshiro Maeda	def.	Hiroshi Umemura	Submission (Armbar)	1	2:26
	Seichi Ikemoto	def.	Hiroki Nagaoka	Decision (Unanimous)	3	5:00
	Kazuki Okubo	def.	Koji Okuyama	Submission (Kimura)	1	4:08
	Tomoyuki Fukami	def.	Atsuhiro Tsuboi	Decision (Unanimous)	3	5:00
	Daisuke Hanazawa	def.	Ken Hamamura	Decision (Unanimous)	2	5:00
	Isamu Sugiuchi	def.	Isao Terada	KO (Punch)	1	4:08
	Shota Fujii	def.	Masaki Ando	TKO (Punches)	3	1:53
	Yumiko Sugimoto	def.	Sakura Nakamura	Submission (Neck Crank)	2	3:05
	Yuji Miyazaki	def.	Kazuhide Terashita	Submission (Armbar)	1	2:03
	Yuji Nishioka	def.	Daisuke Orito	Submission (Rear-Naked Choke)	2	2:54
	Rikiya Kawakami	def.	Takashi Kinukawa	TKO (Doctor Stoppage)	2	2:17

== Deep: 15th Impact ==
Deep: 15th Impact was an event held on July 3, 2004, at Differ Ariake in Tokyo, Japan.

=== Results ===
Main Card
Weight class				Method	Round	Time	Notes
	Jutaro Nakao	def.	Kenji Arai	Submission (Triangle Choke)	1	4:04
	Daisuke Nakamura	def.	Tetsuya Onose	TKO (Punches)	1	0:50
	Shinya Aoki	def.	Seichi Ikemoto	Submission (Armbar)	2	0:52
	Yuji Hoshino	def.	Hiroki Nagaoka	Decision (Unanimous)	3	5:00
	Satoko Shinashi	def.	Su Jeong Sim	Technical Submission (Armbar)	1	2:50
	Kazuki Okubo	def.	Ill Num Kim	Submission (Arm Triangle Choke)	2	1:49
	Takahiro Oba	def.	Yusuke Imamura	TKO (Punches)	1	2:19
	Junpei Hamada	def.	Makoto Miyazawa	Decision (Unanimous)	3	5:00
	Hirohide Fujinuma	vs.	Yoshinori Momose	Draw	2	5:00
	Khosbayar Khosbayar	def.	Yoshinori Kawakami	Decision (Unanimous)	2	5:00
	Kosuke Umeda	vs.	Yutaro Miyamoto	Draw	2	5:00
	Yuya Shirai	def.	Takahiro Nagata	TKO (Punches)	1	4:21

== Deep: Chonan Festival ==
Deep: Chonan Festival was an event held on October 3, 2004, at Mikawa Town Gymnasium in Mikawa.

=== Results ===
Main Card
Weight class				Method	Round	Time	Notes
	Ichiro Kanai	vs.	Hiroki Nagaoka	Draw	2	5:00
	Ken Orihashi	def.	Kazuma Muranaka	KO	1	3:10
	Tomohiko Hori	vs.	Isamu Sugiuchi	Draw	2	5:00
	Tomokazu Aoyama	def.	Yoji Morita	TKO (Punches)	2	1:09
	Jin Hirano	def.	Hiroyuki Takoi	Submission (Rear Naked Choke)	1	1:36
	Nozomu Oikawa	def.	Muneyuki Sato	Submission (Triangle Choke)	1	1:36
	Akiyo Nishiura	def.	Takeshi Sato	KO (Punch)	1	0:39
	Shin Katayama	vs.	Hiroto Suenaga	Draw	2	5:00
	Tomiya Kirimichi	def.	Yutaka Suzuki	Submission (Armbar)	1	4:02

== Deep: clubDeep Toyama: Barbarian Festival 1 ==
Deep: clubDeep Toyama: Barbarian Festival 1 was an event held on October 24, 2004, at Toyama Event Plaza in Toyama.

=== Results ===
Main Card
Weight class				Method	Round	Time	Notes
	Takahiro Oba	def.	Shota Fujii	TKO (Punches)	1	4:02
	Naoki Matsushita	vs.	Tashiro Nishiuchi	Draw	2	5:00
	Goro Kobayashi	def.	Masaki Amada	Submission (Neck Crank)	1	1:10
	Shinobu Aoyama	def.	Akira Kibe	KO (Punch)	1	4:34
	Yoshihiro Tomioka	vs.	Yuichiro Shirai	Draw	2	5:00
	Misaki Takimoto	def.	Miku Matsumoto	Submission (Armbar)	1	4:45
	Akihiro Yamasaki	vs.	Koji Tobisaki	Draw	2	5:00
	Claudio Silva	def.	Atsushi Kondo	TKO (Punches)	2	0:41
	Masaki Yagyu	vs.	Kazuhide Terashita	Draw	2	5:00
	Toshihiko Yokoyama	def.	Motoyuki Takinishi	Submission (Armbar)	2	1:05
	Kei Matsuo	vs.	Hiroyuki Mizutani	Draw	2	5:00
	Tamotsu Kitada	vs.	Toshihiko Ono	Draw	2	5:00
	Yosuke Yosuke	vs.	Takuro Nishimura	Draw	2	5:00
	Masahiko Uechi	def.	Noritsugu Miyake	TKO (Punches)	1	3:56
	Kenta Nakamura	def.	Kazuo Sasakura	TKO (Punches)	1	3:54
	Satoru Yoshida	def.	Yasunori Minami	Submission (Armbar)	1	2:16
	Jun Kito	vs.	Mitsuo Minagawa	Draw	2	5:00
	Mizuki Kawamura	def.	Sumio Hamada	Submission (Armbar)	1	2:16

== Deep: 16th Impact ==
Deep: 16th Impact was an event held on October 30, 2004, at Korakuen Hall in Tokyo, Japan.

=== Results ===
Main Card
Weight class				Method	Round	Time	Notes
Welterweight	Jutaro Nakao	def.	Daisuke Nakamura	TKO (Punches)	3	3:16	(Note: For the Deep Welterweight Championship.)
	Satoko Shinashi	def.	Supannipa Chutipanyo	Submission (Armbar)	1	0:20
	Anthony Netzler	def.	Kaleo Kekauoha	KO (Punch)	1	2:10
	Hiroki Nagaoka	def.	Tetsuya Onose	TKO (Corner Stoppage)	2	5:00
	Jutaro Nakao	def.	Shinya Aoki	KO (Punch)	1	4:29
	Daisuke Nakamura	def.	Yuji Hoshino	KO (Punch)	1	4:33
	Cristiano Kaminishi	def.	Junpei Hamada	TKO (Punches)	1	1:58
	Ryuhei Sato	def.	Wataru Takahashi	Decision (Majority)	2	5:00
	Kosuke Umeda	vs.	Yohei Miyako	Draw	2	5:00
	Yoshinari Ikegami	def.	Kazuya Noda	Submission (Rear Naked Choke)	1	2:27
	Yoshiharu Nakayama	def.	Kohei Kuraoka	Submission (Armbar)	1	4:28
	Ryota Uozumi	def.	Takehiko Ueno	TKO (Punches)	1	1:44

== Deep: clubDeep Osaka ==
Deep: clubDeep Osaka was an event held on November 28, 2004, at Delfin Arena in Osaka.

=== Results ===
Main Card
Weight class				Method	Round	Time	Notes
	Seichi Ikemoto	def.	Teruhiko Kubo	Submission (Armbar)	1	4:58
	Naomichi Nagata	def.	Anthony Netzler	Submission (Kimura)	1	1:45
	Tomoyuki Fukami	vs.	Naoki Matsushita	Draw	2	5:00
	Jackie Ken	vs.	Daruma Daruma	Draw	2	5:00
	Tatsuya Kurahashi	vs.	Kazuki Nojiri	Draw	2	5:00
	Ken Hamamura	vs.	Mitsuhiro Abe	Draw	2	5:00
	Motoyuki Takinishi	def.	Masashi Kameda	Submission (Kimura)	1	4:58
	Rikiya Kawakami	vs.	Hiroki Kurosaki	Draw	2	5:00
	Mauricio Ishizuka	vs.	Yukinari Tamura	Draw	2	5:00
	Nobuhiro Yamauchi	def.	Kotaro Otsuka	Submission (Triangle Choke)	1	1:01
	Joji Kawamata	vs.	Takuya Nakazawa	Draw	2	5:00
	Seichi Okino	vs.	Kenji Matsui	Draw	2	5:00
	Satoru Takadaya	vs.	Haruhiro Minami	Draw	2	5:00

== Deep: 17th Impact ==
Deep: 17th Impact was an event held on December 18, 2004, at Differ Ariake in Tokyo.

=== Results ===
Main Card
Weight class				Method	Round	Time	Notes
Middleweight	Ryuta Sakurai	def.	Ryuki Ueyama (c)	TKO (Punches)	1	2:40	(Note: For the Deep Middleweight Championship.)
	Masakazu Imanari	def.	Renato Tavares	Submission (Heel Hook)	2	2:36
	Takahiro Oba	def.	Kenichiro Shinohara	TKO (Punches)	1	1:58
	Hidetada Irie	def.	Jin O Kim	TKO (Punches)	3	3:31
	Jun Ishii	def.	Nobuyuki Kurashima	TKO (Punches)	2	0:30
	Yasuaki Miyazono	vs.	Hirohide Fujinuma	Draw	2	5:00
	Hiroki Nagaoka	def.	Yutaro Miyamoto	Decision (Unanimous)	2	5:00
	Tetsuya Onose	def.	Wataru Takahashi	Decision (Unanimous)	2	5:00
	Yoshinori Kawakami	def.	Toshiyuki Moriya	TKO (Punches)	1	0:45
	Junpei Hamada	def.	Khosbayar Khosbayar	Decision (Unanimous)	2	5:00
	Nobuhiro Obiya	def.	Joao Batista Yoshimura	TKO (Punches)	1	4:50
	Nobuhiro Obiya	def.	Yoshihiro Tomioka	KO (Punches)	1	1:11
	Joao Batista Yoshimura	def.	Takashi Iotani	Submission (Guillotine Choke)	1	2:07
	Nobuhiro Obiya	def.	Eiji Kani	Submission (Armbar)	1	4:47
	Yoshihiro Tomioka	def.	Kenji Ushioda	KO (Punches)	1	2:26
	Takashi Iotani	def.	Yugo Itagali	KO (Punches)	1	4:04
	Takenori Sato	def.	Moriyuki Yamada	Decision (Unanimous)	2	5:00
	Takenori Sato	def.	Ryo Nakajima	TKO (Punches)	2	2:03
	Moriyuki Yamada	def.	Yukiharu Maejima	TKO (Doctor Stoppage)	1	4:02
	Takenori Sato	def.	Shichi Maru	TKO (Punches)	2	1:00
	Ryo Nakajima	def.	Ken Ogawa	TKO (Punches)	1	2:44
	Yukiharu Maejima	def.	Kenta Maeda	Submission (Kimura)	1	1:00
	Moriyuki Yamada	def.	Motohiro Tachihara	Decision (Unanimous)	2	5:00

== See also ==
- Deep
- List of Deep champions
- List of Deep events
