= 2003 in Deep =

Mixed martial arts events

Information
- First date: March 4, 2003
- Last date: December 7, 2003

Events
- Total events: 8

Fights
- Total fights: 79
- Title fights: 1

Chronology
2002 in Deep	2003 in Deep	2004 in Deep

The year 2003 was the third year in the history of Deep, a mixed martial arts promotion based in Japan. In 2003 Deep held 8 events beginning with, Deep: 8th Impact.

== Title fights ==
Title fights in 2003
Weight class				Method	Round	Time	Event	Notes
Middleweight	Masanori Suda	vs.	Ryuki Ueyama (c)	Draw	3	5:00	Deep: 12th Impact	(Note: For the Deep Middleweight Championship.)

== Events list ==
#	Event title	Date	Arena	Location
17	Deep: clubDeep Osaka	December 7, 2003	Delfin Arena	Osaka
16	Deep: clubDeep West Chofu	November 24, 2003	West Chofu Combat Sports Arena	Tokyo
15	Deep: 12th Impact	September 15, 2003	Ota Ward Gymnasium	Tokyo
14	Deep: 11th Impact	July 13, 2003	Grand Cube	Osaka
13	Deep: 10th Impact	June 25, 2003	Korakuen Hall	Tokyo
12	Deep: clubDeep: Challenge in Club Ozon	May 25, 2003	Club Ozon	Nagoya
11	Deep: 9th Impact	May 5, 2003	Korakuen Hall	Tokyo
10	Deep: 8th Impact	March 4, 2003	Korakuen Hall	Tokyo

== Deep: clubDeep Osaka ==
Deep: clubDeep Osaka was an event held on December 7, 2003, at the Delfin Arena in Osaka, Japan.

=== Results ===
Main Card
Weight class				Method	Round	Time	Notes
	Seichi Ikemoto	def.	Hitoyo Kimura	TKO (Cut)	1	5:00
	Tomoyuki Fukami	vs.	Atsuhiro Tsuboi	Draw	2	5:00
	Daisuke Hanazawa	vs.	M.S. Kobayashi	Draw	2	5:00
	Daichi Fujiwara	def.	Kunihiro Watanabe	TKO (Punches)	1	0:34
	Ken Hamamura	def.	Toshihiko Ono	TKO (Punches)	1	0:12
	Naoji Fujimoto	def.	Kyosuke Akabane	Submission (Armbar)	2	0:29
	Masahito Kawamoto	def.	Keita Inayoshi	TKO (Punches)	1	2:55
	Takuo Miyata	def.	Masaki Yagyu	TKO (Punches)	1	1:12
	Isao Terada	vs.	Akihiro Yamasaki	Draw	2	5:00
	Hiromitsu Bito	vs.	Keichi Enami	Draw	2	5:00

== Deep: clubDeep West Chofu ==
Deep: clubDeep West Chofu was an event held on November 24, 2003, at the West Chofu Combat Sports Arena in Tokyo, Japan.

=== Results ===
Main Card
Weight class				Method	Round	Time	Notes
	Kyosuke Sasaki	vs.	Kosei Kubota	Draw	2	5:00
	Hiroki Nagaoka	def.	Akihiro Nagai	Submission (Armbar)	1	2:51
	Yasunori Yamada	vs.	Masaki Yokoyama	Draw	2	5:00
	Shinya Aoki	def.	Yasutoshi Ryu	Submission (Armbar)	1	0:51
	Ryuhei Sato	def.	Motohiro Tachihara	Decision (Unanimous)	2	5:00
	Chikara Sato	def.	Miki Takiguchi	Decision (Unanimous)	2	5:00
	Isamu Sugiuchi	def.	Masaya Horinochi	TKO (Strikes)	1	2:09
	Shinya Aoki	def.	Dai Okimura	Submission (Armbar)	1	3:14
	Yasutoshi Ryu	def.	Daichi Matsuda	Submission (Kimura)	2	2:12
	Motohiro Tachihara	def.	Kenju Abe	TKO (Corner Stoppage)	1	0:43
	Ryuhei Sato	def.	Yohei Miyako	KO (Punches)	1	0:58
	Miki Takiguchi	def.	Kazunari Nemoto	Submission (Armbar)	1	0:30
	Chikara Sato	def.	Masatoshi Ryu	Submission (Achilles Lock)	1	1:55
	Isamu Sugiuchi	def.	Ryo Numata	KO (Punches)	1	2:00
	Masaya Horinochi	def.	Ippo Watanuki	KO (Head Kick)	1	0:33

== Deep: 12th Impact ==
Deep: 12th Impact was an event held on September 15, 2003, at the Ota Ward Gymnasium in Tokyo, Japan.

=== Results ===
Main Card
Weight class				Method	Round	Time	Notes
Middleweight	Masanori Suda	vs.	Ryuki Ueyama (c)	Draw	3	5:00	(Note: For the Deep Middleweight Championship.)
	Ryo Chonan	def.	Hayato Sakurai	TKO (Doctor Stoppage)	3	2:10
	Dos Caras, Jr.	def.	Brad Kohler	TKO (Shoulder Injury)	1	1:25
	Dokonjonosuke Mishima	def.	Tetsuji Kato	Decision (Majority)	3	5:00
	Makoto Miyazawa	vs.	Yoshinori Momose	Draw	3	5:00
	Ryuta Sakurai	def.	Hirohide Fujinuma	Submission (Kimura)	1	3:46
	Koji Kanechika	def.	Jun Ishii	TKO (Punches)	3	2:11
	Tadahiro Hosaka	def.	Toshi Endo	TKO (Punches)	1	3:53
	Yuya Shirai	def.	Toshimitsu Kai	TKO (Punches)	2	3:48
	Isamu Sugiuchi	def.	Masanori Kanehara	Submission (Rear-Naked Choke)	2	1:44

== Deep: 11th Impact ==
Deep: 11th Impact was an event held on July 13, 2003, at the Grand Cube in Osaka, Japan.

=== Results ===
Main Card
Weight class				Method	Round	Time	Notes
	Dokonjonosuke Mishima	def.	Masakazu Imanari	TKO (Punches)	2	2:58
	Ana Michelle Tavares	def.	Yuka Tsuji	Submission (Triangle Armbar)	1	3:55
	Ryo Chonan	def.	Yuji Hisamatsu	Decision (Majority)	3	5:00
	Eiji Mitsuoka	def.	Gleison Tibau	TKO (Corner Stoppage)	2	3:41
	Seichi Ikemoto	def.	Kyosuke Sasaki	Decision (Unanimous)	3	5:00
	Hiroyuki Ito	def.	Koji Okuyama	Decision (Unanimous)	2	5:00
	Tomoyuki Fukami	def.	Masashi Kameda	KO (Punch)	2	3:46
	Young Choi	def.	Toshihiko Ono	TKO (Punches)	1	4:46
	Ken Hamamura	def.	Tatsunori Tanaka	TKO (Punches)	1	0:59
	Isao Terada	vs.	Takashi Kinukawa	Draw	2	5:00
	Takashi Hasegawa	vs.	Noriyuki Takeuchi	Draw	2	5:00

== Deep: 10th Impact ==
Deep: 10th Impact was an event held on June 25, 2003, at Korakuen Hall in Tokyo, Japan.

=== Results ===
Main Card
Weight class				Method	Round	Time	Notes
	Hayato Sakurai	def.	Dave Menne	TKO (Doctor Stoppage)	2	2:02
	Tomomi Iwama	def.	Noboru Asahi	TKO (Punches)	3	0:42
	Makoto Miyazawa	vs.	Yoshinori Kawakami	Draw	3	5:00
	Hidetada Irie	def.	Hirohide Fujinuma	Decision (Unanimous)	3	5:00
	Tetsuya Onose	def.	Kazuki Okubo	KO (Punches)	1	1:32
	Hidehisa Matsuda	def.	Shoichi Ichimiya	Submission (Rear-Naked Choke)	1	3:39
	Anthony Wayne	def.	Masaki Sawa	Submission (Armbar)	1	3:16
	Kunihiro Watanabe	def.	Yasuhiro Konno	Submission (Armbar)	1	1:36
	Tadahiro Hosaka	def.	Yuichi Otsuka	Submission (Kimura)	1	2:47

== Deep: clubDeep: Challenge in Club Ozon ==
Deep: clubDeep: Challenge in Club Ozon was an event held on May 25, 2003, at Club Ozon in Nagoya, Japan.

=== Results ===
Main Card
Weight class				Method	Round	Time	Notes
	Atsushi Uozumi	def.	Riki Kanesada	TKO (Retirement)	1	5:00
	Tatsuya Kurahashi	def.	Toshiya Fujii	KO (Punch)	1	4:00
	Takuo Miyata	def.	Daiki Nagasako	Submission (Armbar)	1	0:00
	Ryuichi Kawai	vs.	Motoyuki Takinishi	Draw	2	5:00

== Deep: 9th Impact ==
Deep: 9th Impact was an event held on May 5, 2003, at Korakuen Hall in Tokyo, Japan.

=== Results ===
Main Card
Weight class				Method	Round	Time	Notes
	Hiroyuki Ito	def.	Dos Caras, Jr.	DQ (Grabbing the Ropes)	1	3:21
	Takumi Yano	def.	Brazo de Plata	Submission (Heel Hook)	2	0:24
	Takayuki Okada	vs.	Memo Diaz	Draw	2	5:00
	Hikaru Sato	def.	Electroshock	Submission (Heel Hook)	2	0:57
	Kazuki Okubo	def.	Kato Kung Lee Jr.	Submission (Armbar)	1	3:28
	Eiji Ishikawa	def.	Ryuta Sakurai	TKO (Punches)	2	4:22
	Hirohide Fujinuma	def.	Kengo Mashimo	TKO (Punches)	1	2:09
	Tomoyuki Fukami	def.	Nariatsu Iwasaki	Submission (Armbar)	1	3:25
	Ryu Echigo	def.	Hidehisa Matsuda	TKO (Punches)	2	0:13
	Kazutaka Omigawa	def.	Atsushi Sugano	Submission (Armbar)	1	1:30
	Yuichi Otsuka	def.	Etsuya Kimura	Submission (Armbar)	2	4:33
	Toshi Endo	vs.	Kosaku Shikimasu	Draw	2	5:00

== Deep: 8th Impact ==
Deep: 8th Impact was an event held on March 4, 2003, at Korakuen Hall in Tokyo, Japan.

=== Results ===
Main Card
Weight class				Method	Round	Time	Notes
	Hayato Sakurai	def.	Ryuki Ueyama	Decision (Unanimous)	3	5:00
	Dokonjonosuke Mishima	def.	Fabio Mello	Decision (Unanimous)	3	5:00
	Osami Shibuya	vs.	Yasuhito Namekawa	Draw	3	5:00
	Hidetada Irie	vs.	Makoto Miyazawa	Draw	2	5:00
	Koji Takeuchi	vs.	Tashiro Nishiuchi	Draw	3	5:00
	Tomomi Iwama	def.	Masashi Kameda	Decision (Unanimous)	3	5:00
	Moriyuki Yamada	vs.	Tomoki Kanuka	Draw	3	5:00
	Tony Nelson	def.	Koichi Ota	DQ (Kick to Groin)	1	5:00

== See also ==
- Deep
- List of Deep champions
- List of Deep events
