= Satoko Shinashi =

Japanese mixed martial artist

- Born: January 29, 1977 (age 49); Tokyo, Japan
- Other names: Princess
- Nationality: Japanese
- Height: 4 ft 10 in (1.47 m)
- Weight: 100 lb (45 kg; 7.1 st)
- Division: Atomweight; Strawweight
- Style: Judo, Sambo, Brazilian Jiu-Jitsu
- Team: Chambers Tokyo (formerly); Girl Fight AACC (2001–2003); Mach Dojo; Zendokai Yokohama
- Years active: 2001–2008, 2014–present

Mixed martial arts record
- Total: 46
- Wins: 40
- By knockout: 5
- By submission: 27
- By decision: 8
- Losses: 4
- By knockout: 2
- By decision: 2
- Draws: 2

Other information
- University: Nippon Sport Science University
- Mixed martial arts record from Sherdog

Satoko Shinashi (しなし さとこ, Shinashi Satoko; legal name 尻無 智子, born January 29, 1977) is a female Japanese mixed martial artist. She is a former DEEP Flyweight champion and former Smackgirl Flyweight champion. She is tied second for the most bouts among women and is considered as one of the pioneers of women's mixed martial arts.

== Background ==
Influenced by her father, Shinashi started training Judo at the age of 15, stopping the discipline after graduating from Nippon Sport Science University at 22. She then started competing in Sambo, in which she excelled in international competition.

== Mixed martial arts career ==
After a short amateur career, Shinashi turned pro in 2001.

=== Smackgirl ===
Racking an undefeated record of 4–0–1 in her first five bouts, she entered Smackgirl 2002 Lightweight tournament in late 2002. (Note: The weight limit for the tournament was 50kg (110lb).) She finished all three bouts and won the tournament title with the second-round submission of Hisae Watanabe.

=== DEEP ===
After amassing three more wins in Smackgirl, Shinashi made her promotional debut in DEEP: 13th Impact in early January 2004 and would go on undefeated for ten more bouts, mostly in DEEP.

=== Smackgirl Flyweight Champion ===
On November 29, 2005, Shinashi faced Naoko Omuro at Smackgirl: Lightweight Anniversary for the inaugural Smackgirl Flyweight Championship. (Note: In Smackgirl, Flyweight division was up to 48kg (105lb), which is in modern day mixed martial arts known as the Atomweight division.) She won the fight and the championship via unanimous decision.

=== DEEP Lightweight title shot ===
After winning the Smackgirl title Shinashi returned to DEEP, submitting Shiho Yamato in the second round at DEEP: 24th Impact. With the win she earned the opportunity compete for the inaugural DEEP Women's Lightweight Championship in a rematch against Hisae Watanabe. She lost the bout via first-round knockout, which marked the first loss of her career.

After bouncing back with two wins, Shinashi defended her Smackgirl Flyweight Championship against Misaki Takimoto on March 11, 2007, with a split decision win.

=== DEEP Flyweight Championship reign ===
With two more wins in both promotions, Shinashi entered a four-woman, one-night tournament at DEEP: 34th Impact that would crown the inaugural DEEP Flyweight Champion. (Note: In DEEP, Flyweight division was up to 44kg (97lb).) She capture the title by first defeating Fukuko Hamada via unanimous decision and then submitting Sachiko Yamamoto in the first round of the final.

After capturing the title, Shinashi suffered her second loss against a professional wrestler Mai Ichii at DEEP: 35th Impact in a non-title bout before submitting Yukiko Seki at DEEP: 38th Impact on October 23, 2008.

=== Return from hiatus ===
Having been on hiatus for six years, Shinashi returned to competition in late 2014. She racked nine finish victories with two defeats in DEEP and Road FC before being scheduled to defend her DEEP Flyweight title against Mizuki Oshiro at DEEP: 95 Impact on May 6, 2020. However, the event was cancelled due to the COVID-19 pandemic.

=== Post-title reign ===
In August 2020, Shinashi vacated her title due to the pandemic's adverse effects on her training.

With more than three years removed from her previous bout, Shinashi faced Reina Kobayashi at DEEP: 112 Impact on February 11, 2023. She won her return via unanimous decision.

Shinashi faced Kyoka Minagawa on November 11, 2023 at DEEP: 113 Impact, winning the bout via unanimous decision.

== Personal life ==
Shinashi was married in September 2007 and gave birth to her first child, a son, on July 5, 2009.

== Championships and accomplishments ==
- DEEP
  - DEEP Women's Flyweight Championship (one time; former)
- Smackgirl
  - Smackgirl Flyweight Championship (one time; only)
    - One successful title defense

== Mixed martial arts record ==
Professional record breakdown
46 matches	40 wins	4 losses
By knockout	5	2
By submission	27	0
By decision	8	2
Draws	2	

Res.	Record	Opponent	Method	Event	Date	Round	Time	Location	Notes
Win	40–4–2	Kyoka Minagawa	Decision (unanimous)	Deep: 116 Impact	November 11, 2023	2	5:00	Tokyo, Japan	
Win	39–4–2	Reina Kobayashi	Decision (unanimous)	Deep: 112 Impact	February 11, 2023	2	5:00	Tokyo, Japan	
Loss	38–4–2	Mizuki Oshiro	TKO (punches)	Deep: 93 Impact	December 15, 2019	1	1:51	Tokyo, Japan	
Win	38–3–2	Madoka Ishibashi	Submission (armbar)	Deep: 90 Impact	June 29, 2019	1	3:05	Tokyo, Japan	
Win	37–3–2	Ye Jin Jung	TKO (punches)	Deep: 83 Impact	April 28, 2018	1	4:37	Tokyo, Japan	
Win	36–3–2	Chiaki Ota	TKO (punches)	Deep: Cage Impact 2017	July 15, 2017	1	1:36	Tokyo, Japan	
Loss	35–3–2	Ye Ji Lee	Decision (unanimous)	Road FC 37	March 11, 2017	3	5:00	Seoul, South Korea	Catchweight (46.5kg) bout.
Win	35–2–2	Proof Date	TKO (punches)	Deep: 76 Impact	June 26, 2016	1	1:32	Tokyo, Japan	
Win	34–2–2	Hee Da Choi	Submission (rear-naked choke)	Deep: 73 Impact	October 17, 2015	2	2:30	Tokyo, Japan	
Win	33–2–2	Ye Ji Lee	TKO (punches)	ROAD FC 24	July 25, 2015	2	4:53	Tokyo, Japan	
Win	32–2–2	Emi Yamamoto	Technical Submission (armbar)	Deep: 71 Impact	February 28, 2015	1	1:36	Tokyo, Japan	
Win	31–2–2	Rika Hamada	Technical Submission (armbar)	Deep: Dream Impact 2014: Omisoka Special	December 23, 2014	1	3:29	Tokyo, Japan	
Win	30–2–2	Ye Jin Jung	TKO (punches)	Deep: 69 Impact	October 26, 2014	1	2:15	Tokyo, Japan	
Win	29–2–2	Yukiko Seki	Submission (armbar)	Deep: 38 Impact	October 23, 2008	1	1:32	Tokyo, Japan	
Loss	28–2–2	Mai Ichii	Decision (majority)	Deep: 35 Impact	May 19, 2008	2	5:00	Tokyo, Japan	Non-title bout. Catchweight (121 lb) bout.
Win	28–1–2	Sachiko Yamamoto	Submission (armbar)	Deep: 34 Impact	February 22, 2008	1	3:58	Tokyo, Japan	Won the inaugural Deep Women's Flyweight Championship. Later vacated the title.
Win	27–1–2	Fukuko Hamada	Decision (unanimous)	Deep: 34 Impact	February 22, 2008	2	5:00	Tokyo, Japan	DEEP Women's Flyweight Championship tournament semifinal.
Win	26–1–2	Akemi Morihara	Submission (heel hook)	Smackgirl: Starting Over	December 26, 2007	1	4:17	Tokyo, Japan	
Win	25–1–2	Sachiko Yamamoto	Submission (straight armbar)	Deep: 32 Impact	October 9, 2007	1	3:11	Tokyo, Japan	
Win	24–1–2	Misaki Takimoto	Decision (split)	Smackgirl: Will The Queen Paint The Shinjuku Skies Red?	March 11, 2007	3	5:00	Tokyo, Japan	Defended the Smackgirl Flyweight Championship.
Win	23–1–2	Tae Kyung Kim	Submission (armbar)	Deep: 27 Impact	December 20, 2006	1	4:16	Tokyo, Japan	
Win	22–1–2	Yuka Okumura	Submission (armbar)	HEAT 2	September 23, 2006	1	0:45	Nagoya, Japan	
Loss	21–1–2	Hisae Watanabe	KO (punch)	Deep: 25 Impact	August 4, 2006	1	3:54	Tokyo, Japan	For the inaugural Deep Women's Lightweight Championship.
Win	21–0–2	Shiho Yamato	Submission (armbar)	Deep: 24 Impact	April 11, 2006	2	2:20	Tokyo, Japan	
Win	20–0–2	Naoko Omuro	Decision (unanimous)	Smackgirl: Lightweight Anniversary	November 29, 2005	3	5:00	Tokyo, Japan	Won the inaugural Smackgirl Flyweight Championship.
Win	19–0–2	Noriko Okamoto	Submission (armbar)	Deep: 20th Impact	September 3, 2005	1	0:48	Tokyo, Japan	
Win	18–0–2	Mari Kaneko	Decision (unanimous)	Deep: 19th Impact	July 8, 2005	2	5:00	Tokyo, Japan	
Win	17–0–2	Pamela Vitz	Submission (armbar)	Shooto: 5/4 in Korakuen Hall	May 4, 2005	1	2:13	Tokyo, Japan	
Draw	16–0–2	Mari Kaneko	Draw (unanimous)	Deep: 18th Impact	February 12, 2005	2	5:00	Tokyo, Japan	
Win	16–0–1	Supannipa Chutipanyo	Submission (armbar)	Deep: 16th Impact	October 30, 2004	1	0:20	Tokyo, Japan	
Win	15–0–1	Su Jeong Sim	Technical submission (armbar)	Deep: 15th Impact	July 3, 2004	1	2:50	Tokyo, Japan	
Win	14–0–1	Nana Ichikawa	Submission (heel hook)	Love Impact 2	June 6, 2004	1	0:45	Tokyo, Japan	
Win	13–0–1	Yuki Furutachi	Submission (armbar)	Deep: clubDeep Fukuoka: Team Roken Festival	March 20, 2004	1	1:28	Fukuoka, Japan	
Win	12–0–1	Kayo Nagayasu	Technical submission (armbar)	Love Impact 1	February 8, 2004	1	3:17	Tokyo, Japan	
Win	11–0–1	Naoko Omuro	Decision (unanimous)	Deep: 13th Impact	January 22, 2004	2	5:00	Tokyo, Japan	
Win	10–0–1	Misaki Takimoto	Submission (armbar)	Smackgirl: Third Season 5	July 6, 2003	1	2:03	Tokyo, Japan	
Win	9–0–1	Caroline Hoeberchts	Submission (armbar)	Smackgirl: Third Season 3	May 7, 2003	1	1:52	Tokyo, Japan	
Win	8–0–1	Reiko Kawae	Submission (armbar)	Smackgirl: Third Season 2	April 2, 2003	1	2:39	Tokyo, Japan	
Win	7–0–1	Hisae Watanabe	Submission (heel hook)	Smackgirl: Japan Cup 2002 Grand Final	December 29, 2002	2	0:34	Tokyo, Japan	Won the Smackgirl 2002 Japan Cup Lightweight tournament.
Win	6–0–1	Maiko Okada	Submission (heel hook)	Smackgirl: Japan Cup 2002 Episode 2	November 9, 2002	2	2:28	Tokyo, Japan	
Win	5–0–1	Miki Katagiri	Submission (armbar)	Smackgirl: Japan Cup 2002 Opening Round	October 5, 2002	1	2:35	Tokyo, Japan	
Win	4–0–1	Kinuyo Yoshizumi	Decision (unanimous)	Smackgirl: Summer Gate 2002	August 4, 2002	3	5:00	Tokyo, Japan	
Draw	3–0–1	Kinuyo Yoshizumi	Draw	Shoot Boxing: S-Cup 2002	July 7, 2002	3	5:00	Yokohama, Japan	
Win	3–0–0	Aiko Koike	Submission (armbar)	Smackgirl: Royal Smack 2002	April 7, 2002	1	1:01	Tokyo, Japan	
Win	2–0–0	Misaki Takimoto	Submission (armbar)	Smackgirl: God Bless You	March 2, 2002	1	4:32	Tokyo, Japan	
Win	1–0–0	Aya Koyama	Submission (armbar)	AX – Vol. 2: We Want To Shine	December 26, 2001	1	2:29	Tokyo, Japan	

== See also ==
- List of current mixed martial arts champions
- List of female mixed martial artists
