= Dokonjonosuke Mishima =

Japanese martial artist

Dokonjonosuke Mishima 三島☆ド根城之助
- Born: Yoshitomi Mishima; April 19, 1972 (age 54); Amagasaki, Hyōgo, Japan
- Height: 5 ft 7 in (1.70 m)
- Weight: 145 lb (66 kg; 10.4 st)
- Division: Featherweight
- Fighting out of: Osaka, Japan
- Years active: 1998–2011

Mixed martial arts record
- Total: 30
- Wins: 21
- By knockout: 3
- By submission: 8
- By decision: 10
- Losses: 7
- By knockout: 2
- By submission: 3
- By decision: 2
- Draws: 2

Other information
- Mixed martial arts record from Sherdog

Yoshitomi Mishima (三島睦智, Mishima Yoshitomi) known as Dokonjonosuke Mishima (三島☆ド根性ノ助, Mishima Dokonjōnosuke; born April 19, 1972), also written Dokonjyonosuke Mishima, is a Japanese mixed martial artist and professional wrestler. He has competed professionally since 1998 in organizations such as Shooto, DEEP, PRIDE, the UFC and in his pro wrestling days he has competed in Kiyoshi Tamura's organization U-Style Pro Wrestling.

Mishima is known for his charisma and emphasis on entertainment as well as competition. He typically enters the arena in an outlandish fashion, such as in his UFC debut, where he sported a bathrobe and devil mask while clutching a Snoopy stuffed animal.

== Career ==
On December 14, 2002, Mishima challenged Takanori Gomi for the Shooto welterweight (154 lb) championship, but lost by technical knockout due to punches.

On February 12, 2005, Mishima was victorious against fellow DEEP veteran Tomomi Iwama becoming the first lightweight (155 lb) champion of the organisation. However, Mishima didn't defend his belt and returned it one year later.

Mishima had four fights in PRIDE, winning over Charles Bennett and Marcus Aurélio and losing to Yves Edwards and Ralph Gracie. His final appearance with the company was in the reserve fight of PRIDE Bushido 9 on September 25, 2005, where he defeated fellow alternate Charles Bennett with an ankle lock.

On November 18, 2006, Mishima made his debut in the U.S. at UFC 65. Joe Stevenson, the winner of The Ultimate Fighter 2 who had just moved down to the lightweight division (155 lb), defeated Mishima in the first round by a guillotine choke.

Mishima's fought Kenny Florian at UFC Fight Night 9 on April 5, 2007, in Las Vegas. Mishima lost to a rear naked choke, shortly after attempting to submit Florian with a knee bar.

On May 19, 2008, Mishima dropped to featherweight (145 lb) to fight Masakazu Imanari. Mishima won by unanimous decision, becoming the DEEP featherweight champion. He also became the first man to capture the DEEP belt in two different divisions.

== Championships and accomplishments ==
- DEEP
  - Deep Lightweight Championship (1 Time, First)
  - Deep Featherweight Championship (1 Time)
- Ultimate Fighting Championship
  - Fight of the Night (1 Time)

== Mixed martial arts record ==
Professional record breakdown
30 matches	21 wins	7 losses
By knockout	3	2
By submission	8	3
By decision	10	2
Draws	2	

Res.	Record	Opponent	Method	Event	Date	Round	Time	Location	Notes
Win	21–7–2	Takeshi Yamazaki	Decision (unanimous)	Grabaka Live - 1st Cage Attack	October 15, 2011	2	5:00	Tokyo, Japan	
Loss	20–7–2	Takafumi Otsuka	Decision (unanimous)	Deep: 43 Impact	August 23, 2009	3	5:00	Tokyo, Japan	Lost the DEEP Featherweight Championship.
Win	20–6–2	Toshiaki Kitada	TKO (punches)	Deep: Protect Impact 2008	December 22, 2008	2	2:51	Tokyo, Japan	Non-title bout.
Win	19–6–2	Masakazu Imanari	Decision (unanimous)	Deep: 35 Impact	May 19, 2008	3	5:00	Tokyo, Japan	Featherweight debut. Won the DEEP Featherweight Championship.
Loss	18–6–2	Kenny Florian	Technical Submission (rear naked choke)	UFC Fight Night: Stevenson vs. Guillard	April 5, 2007	3	3:57	Las Vegas, Nevada, United States	Fight of the Night.
Loss	18–5–2	Joe Stevenson	Submission (guillotine choke)	UFC 65: Bad Intentions	November 18, 2006	1	2:07	Sacramento, California, United States	
Win	18–4–2	Charles Bennett	Submission (ankle lock)	Pride: Bushido 9	September 25, 2005	1	4:04	Tokyo, Japan	Pride 2005 Lightweight Grand Prix Quarterfinals. Later withdrew from tournament due to injury.
Loss	17–4–2	Yves Edwards	Submission (armbar)	Pride: Bushido 7	May 22, 2005	1	4:36	Tokyo, Japan	
Win	17–3–2	Tomomi Iwama	Decision (unanimous)	Deep: 18th Impact	February 12, 2005	3	5:00	Tokyo, Japan	Won the DEEP Lightweight Championship. Later vacated title.
Win	16–3–2	Marcus Aurélio	Decision (split)	PRIDE Bushido 4	July 19, 2004	2	5:00	Nagoya, Japan	
Win	15–3–2	Rob Emerson	Decision (unanimous)	Deep: 14th Impact	April 18, 2004	3	5:00	Osaka, Japan	
Loss	14–3–2	Ralph Gracie	Decision (unanimous)	PRIDE Bushido 1	October 5, 2003	2	5:00	Saitama, Japan	
Win	14–2–2	Tetsuji Kato	Decision (majority)	Deep - 12th Impact	September 15, 2003	3	5:00	Tokyo, Japan	
Win	13–2–2	Masakazu Imanari	TKO (punches)	Deep - 11th Impact	July 13, 2003	2	2:58	Osaka, Japan	
Win	12–2–2	Fábio Mello	Decision (unanimous)	Deep - 8th Impact	March 4, 2003	3	5:00	Tokyo, Japan	
Loss	11–2–2	Takanori Gomi	TKO (punches)	Shooto - Year End Show 2002	December 14, 2002	2	0:52	Tokyo, Japan	For the Shooto World Welterweight (154 lb) Championship.
Win	11–1–2	Takafumi Ito	Submission (armbar)	Deep - 6th Impact	September 7, 2002	1	0:53	Tokyo, Japan	
Win	10–1–2	Iran Mascarenhas	Submission (achilles lock)	Shooto - Treasure Hunt 7	June 29, 2002	2	4:53	Osaka, Japan	
Win	9–1–2	Masao Ando	Submission (triangle choke)	Pancrase - Spirit 4	May 11, 2002	2	2:22	Osaka, Japan	
Win	8–1–2	Ben Thomas	TKO (punches)	Shooto - Treasure Hunt 3	February 11, 2002	1	3:07	Kobe, Japan	
Win	7–1–2	Ryan Bow	Decision (majority)	Shooto – To The Top Final Act	December 16, 2001	3	5:00	Tokyo, Japan	
Win	6–1–2	Marcio Barbosa	Submission (kneebar)	Shooto – R.E.A.D. Final	December 17, 2000	2	4:51	Tokyo, Japan	
Win	5–1–2	Tony DeDolph	Submission (armbar)	HOOKnSHOOT – Fusion	November 18, 2000	1	4:53	Indiana, United States	
Draw	4–1–2	Marcio Feitosa	Draw	Shooto – R.E.A.D. 9	August 27, 2000	3	5:00	Yokohama, Japan	
Win	4–1–1	Justin Wisniewski	Submission (cobra hold)	Shooto – R.E.A.D. 8	August 4, 2000	1	1:30	Osaka, Japan	
Loss	3–1–1	Din Thomas	TKO (cut)	Shooto – R.E.A.D. 2	March 17, 2000	2	3:37	Tokyo, Japan	
Win	3–0–1	Kazuya Abe	Decision (unanimous)	Shooto - Renaxis 5	October 29, 1999	2	5:00	Osaka, Japan	
Win	2–0–1	Makoto Ishikawa	Decision (unanimous)	Shooto - Renaxis 3	August 4, 1999	2	5:00	Tokyo, Japan	
Win	1–0–1	Hiroki Kotani	Submission (rear naked choke)	Shooto - Shooter's Passion	May 27, 1999	1	4:00	Tokyo, Japan	
Draw	0–0–1	Satoshi Fujisaki	Draw	Shooto - Las Grandes Viajes 1	January 17, 1998	2	5:00	Tokyo, Japan	

== See also ==
- List of male mixed martial artists
