= Masakazu Imanari =

Japanese martial artist (born 1976)

Masakazu Imanari 今成正和
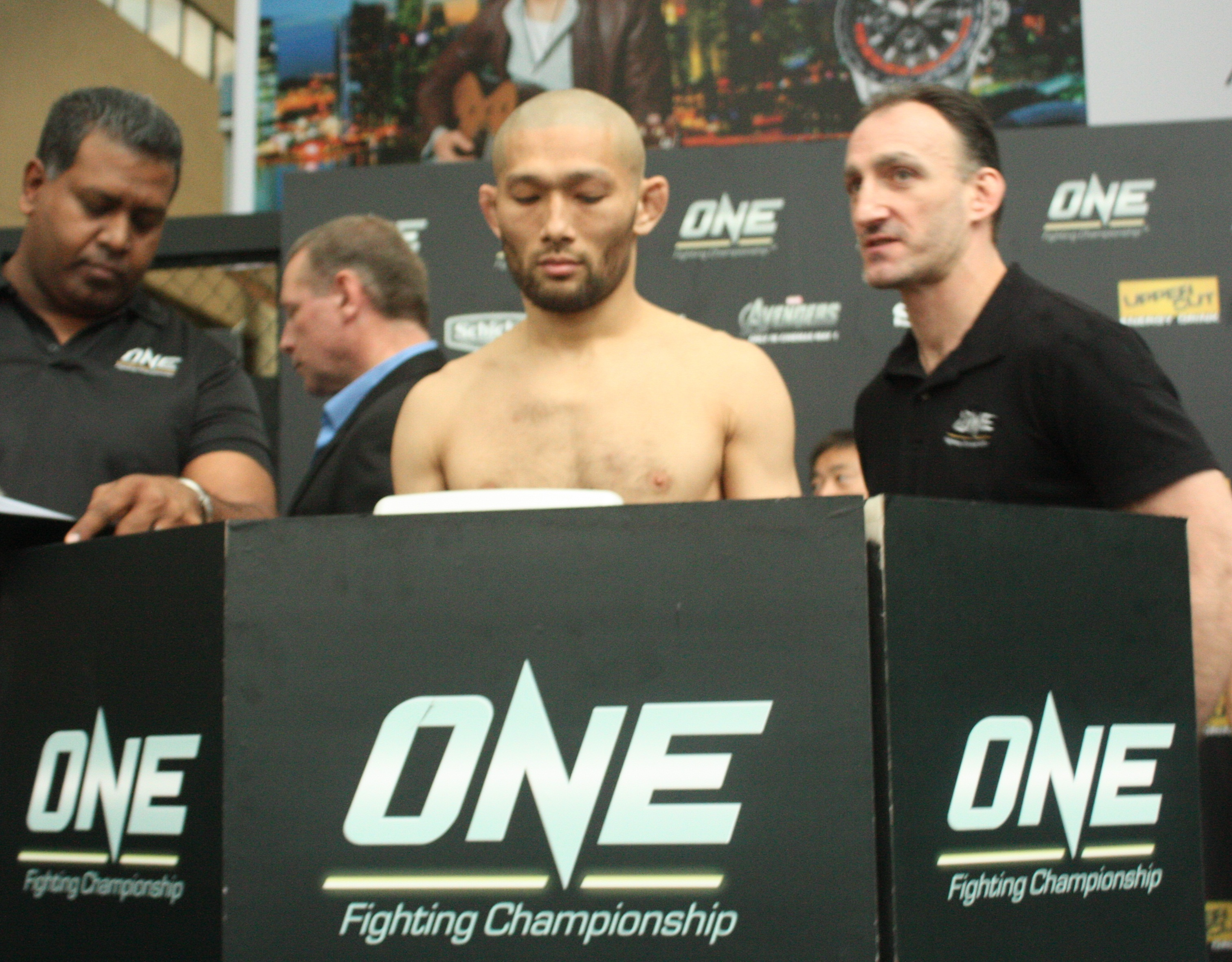
- Born: February 10, 1976 (age 50); Hadano, Kanagawa, Japan
- Other names: "Ashikan Judan", "The Leglock Yokai"
- Nationality: Japanese
- Height: 164 cm (5 ft 4 1/2 in)
- Weight: 61 kg (134 lb; 9.6 st)
- Division: Bantamweight; Featherweight; Lightweight
- Style: Shoot wrestling, Brazilian jiu-jitsu
- Fighting out of: Tokyo, Japan
- Team: Kingdom; Team Roken; Nippon Top Team
- Rank: Class-A Shootist; Black belt in Brazilian jiu-jitsu
- Years active: 2000–present

Mixed martial arts record
- Total: 64
- Wins: 40
- By knockout: 1
- By submission: 29
- By decision: 10
- Losses: 22
- By knockout: 4
- By decision: 18
- Draws: 2

Other information
- Mixed martial arts record from Sherdog

Masakazu Imanari (Japanese: 今成正和, Imanari Masakazu; born 10 February 1976) is a Japanese mixed martial artist and submission wrestler. He currently competes in the Bantamweight division of Rizin Fighting Federation. A professional competitor since 2000, he is a veteran of ONE Championship, DEEP, ZST, Pancrase, PRIDE Fighting Championships, and Cage Rage. He was in the final Cage Rage Featherweight Champion, DEEP Bantamweight Champion, two-time DEEP Featherweight Champion and DREAM Japan Grand Prix Finalist.

Imanari is a successful submission wrestler, placing as runner-up twice at the All-Japan Combat Wrestling Championship. He is the namesake of the "Imanari roll" maneuver.

He runs Imanari Jiu-Jitsu Academy in Shinjuku.

== Mixed martial arts career ==
After a childhood marked by a spinal condition which required surgery three times, Masakazu had his first contact with combat sports at age 18, training kickboxing and catch wrestling at the Fujiwara Dojo by Satoru Sayama's mediation. He later moved to Antonio Inoki's Universal Fighting-Arts Organization, and then Kingdom Ehrgeiz, where he trained shoot fighting (a fighting style based on catch wrestling) and MMA with Hidetada Irie before doing his amateur debut.

=== ZST ===
Imanari gained popularity during his mixed martial arts career in Japanese promotion ZST fighting the likes of top Lightweights including Dokonjonosuke Mishima, Jorge Gurgel and Marcus Aurélio despite being a much smaller Featherweight. He defeated Gurgel, who is a Brazilian jiu-jitsu black belt former UFC fighter via catch wrestling staple submission (heel hook) while being lighter in weight. Imanari also defeated former Cage Warriors Featherweight Champion Danny Batten. In the first round Batten took Imanari down on the ropes but Imanari attempted a triangle choke. Batten escaped it but Imanari then transitioned to an armbar causing Batten to submit in just over 40 seconds.

=== DEEP ===
Imanari moved on to compete in DEEP where he defeated a top WEC contender and the former WEC Featherweight Champion Mike Brown via submission (heel hook) where Brown's leg became dislocated. Imanari now a top contender in DEEP went on to compete for the title shot against Yoshiro Maeda in which he defeated Maeda via submission (toe hold) to become the new DEEP Featherweight Champion. Imanari made his first KO victory in his first defense for the belt against Takeshi Yamazaki with an up kick.

=== Cage Rage ===
His next fight, which was his first fight outside Japan, was in London, England where he became the Cage Rage World Featherweight Champion by defeating Robbie Olivier with a flying armbar at Cage Rage 20. This accomplishment made him the only mixed martial artist in the Featherweight division to hold belts in two separate major promotions (DEEP and Cage Rage). He defended his Cage Rage belt for the first time against Jean Silva, winning by reverse heel hook in the first round, injuring Silva's knee in the process.

=== DREAM ===
==== DREAM Featherweight Grand Prix ====
Imanari was a participant in the Dream Featherweight (63 kg / 138 lb) Grand Prix and won his first-round matchup against Atsushi Yamamoto by split decision at DREAM 7 but lost to current DREAM Featherweight Champion Bibiano Fernandes by unanimous decision at DREAM 9.

==== DREAM Bantamweight Grand Prix ====
In 2011 Imanari returned to DREAM to take part in the DREAM Bantamweight Japan Tournament. He won his first two tournament fights in a single night defeating both Keisuke Fujiwara and Kenji Osawa at Dream: Fight for Japan!. The tournament finals took place at Dream: Japan GP Final where Imanari faced off with Hideo Tokoro. Tokoro defeated Imanari to win the tournament, the second-place finish gained Imanari entrance into the Bantamweight Grand Prix. Imanari faced Abel Cullum in the opening round of the Bantamweight Grand Prix at Dream 17 at Saitama Super Arena in Saitama, Japan, on Sept. 24. He won the bout via submission in the third round. In the semifinal round at Fight For Japan: Genki Desu Ka Omisoka 2011, Imanari lost to Antonio Banuelos via split decision.

=== ONE Fighting Championship ===
On January 31, 2012 it was announced that Imanari would be fighting for ONE Fighting Championship, who have a partnership with DREAM which allows both organizations to share fighters. He faced unbeaten URCC Flyweight Champion Kevin Belingon at ONE Fighting Championship 3 at the Singapore Indoor Stadium on March 31. He won the fight via submission in the first round.

After over a year away from the sport, Imanari returned to face Yuta Nezu at Road to ONE 3: Tokyo Fight Night on September 10, 2020. Imanari lost the fight by unanimous decision.

=== Rizin Fighting Federation ===
Imanari faced Kenta Takizawa in the opening round of the Bantamweight Grand Prix at Rizin 29 on May 30, 2021. He lost the bout via unanimous decision.

Imanari faced Takeshi Kasugai on October 10, 2021 at Rizin Landmark Vol.1. He won the bout via armbar in the first round.

Imanari faced Chihiro Suzuki at Rizin Landmark 4 on November 6, 2022. He lost the bout via unanimous decision.

Imanari faced Kazumasa Majima in the co-main event of Rizin Landmark 8 on February 24, 2024. He won the fight by submission in the second round.

== Submission wrestling career ==
Imanari competed at the 6th All Japan Combat Wrestling Championship on March 20, 2000 in Tokyo. He placed second in the 69 kg division behind Kazuya Abe.

Imanari competed at the 7th All Japan Combat Wrestling Championship on March 20, 2001. He placed second again, this time in the 76 kg division behind Rumina Sato.

Imanari competed at Quintet Fight Night 5 on October 27, 2020 as a part of Team Tokoro Plus α 2nd. He registered two draws at the event but his team won the tournament.

He then faced Kenta Iwamoto in the main event of Battle Hazard 8 on November 22, 2020. He lost the match by submission after Iwamoto caught him in an arm-triangle choke.

Imanari competed against Mikey Musumeci in a submission grappling match at ONE 156 on April 22, 2022. Musumeci submitted him with a rear-naked choke at 4:09 that earned a $50,000 'Performance Bonus'.

Imanari challenged Takuma Sudo for the featherweight title at Level-G Pro on June 16, 2024. He lost the match by submission.

Imanari competed against Marcelo Garcia at ONE 170 on January 24, 2025. He lost the match by submission with a north-south choke.

== Team allegiances ==
Imanari left catch wrestling-based team Team Roken in 2008 and founded Nippon Top Team with Shinya Aoki and Satoru Kitaoka. However, Aoki left for Evolve MMA of Singapore, whereas Kitaoka joined Lotus Paraestra, Setagaya branch of Paraestra. Consequently, Imanari founded his own team, Imanari Jiu JItsu.

Imanari is an A-level shoot wrestler (better known as catch wrestling in the west) under Yuki Nakai. He was later also presented a Brazilian jiu-jitsu black belt by Marco Barbosa.

== Fighting style ==
Imanari is primarily a grappler, and is universally known for his skill and preference for leglocks, which gained him the nickname of "Ashikan Judan" ("The Great Master of Leg Submissions"). Though his striking game is considered inferior, Imanari often engages in stand-up battles in order to bait the opponent to the ground, usually by dropping down after or while seizing control of his leg or by way of ashi garami. He stands out for his dexterity in toehold and heel hook variations, and is an avid user of the 50/50 guard in order to transition between submission attempts. He describes his signature leglock style as not based in sambo as it is popularly believed, but "purely self-taught", and explained his preference for it as "because it hurts the opponent".

The "Imanari Roll" (rolling from a stand up position into a leglock) and the "leggy neck choke" (a combination of an omoplata and a rear naked choke) are grappling moves named after him due to his usage of them.

== Championships and accomplishments ==
=== Mixed martial arts ===
- Cage Rage
  - Cage Rage World Featherweight Championship (One time, only)
    - One successful title defense
- DEEP
  - DEEP Bantamweight Championship (One time; first)
    - Two successful title defenses
  - DEEP Featherweight Championship (Two times, first)
    - One successful title defense
- DREAM
  - 2011 Japan Bantamweight Grand Prix runner-up
  - 2011 World Bantamweight Grand Prix semifinalist

=== Submission wrestling ===
- Japan Combat Wrestling Association
  - 6th All Japan Combat Wrestling Championship (2000) - 69 kg, 2nd place
  - 7th All Japan Combat Wrestling Championship (2001) - 76 kg, 2nd place

== Mixed martial arts record ==
Professional record breakdown
64 matches	40 wins	22 losses
By knockout	1	4
By submission	29	0
By decision	10	18
Draws	2	

Res.	Record	Opponent	Method	Event	Date	Round	Time	Location	Notes
Win	40–22–2	Kazumasa Majima	Submission (armbar)	Rizin Landmark 8	February 24, 2024	2	1:37	Saga, Japan	
Loss	39–22–2	Chihiro Suzuki	Decision (unanimous)	Rizin Landmark 4	November 6, 2022	3	5:00	Nagoya, Japan	
Loss	39–21–2	Takahiro Ashida	Decision (unanimous)	Deep: 109 Impact	August 21, 2022	3	5:00	Tokyo, Japan	
Win	39–20–2	Takeshi Kasugai	Submission (armbar)	Rizin Landmark 1	October 2, 2021	1	2:50	Tokyo, Japan	
Loss	38–20–2	Kenta Takizawa	Decision (unanimous)	Rizin 29	June 27, 2021	3	5:00	Osaka, Japan	Rizin Bantamweight Grand Prix 2021 Opening Round.
Loss	38–19–2	Yuta Nezu	Decision (unanimous)	Road to ONE 3: Tokyo Fight Night	September 10, 2020	3	5:00	Tokyo, Japan	
Win	38–18–2	Kwon Won-il	Submission (heel hook)	ONE: Call to Greatness	February 22, 2019	1	0:53	Kallang, Singapore	
Win	37–18–2	Radeem Rahman	Submission (armbar)	ONE: Pursuit of Greatness	October 26, 2018	1	1:23	Yangon, Myanmar	
Loss	36–18–2	Kim Dae-hwan	Decision (unanimous)	ONE: Heroes of Honor	April 20, 2018	3	5:00	Manila, Philippines	
Loss	36–17–2	Yusup Saadulaev	Decision (unanimous)	ONE: Kings of Courage	January 20, 2018	3	5:00	Jakarta, Indonesia	
Win	36–16–2	Juri Ohara	Submission (leglock)	DEEP 78 Impact: Welterweight GP 2nd Round	March 18, 2017	1	0:23	Tokyo, Japan	
Win	35–16–2	Tatsunao Nagakura	Decision (split)	DEEP Cage Impact 2016: DEEP vs. WSOF-GC	December 17, 2016	3	5:00	Tokyo, Japan	Won the vacant DEEP Featherweight Championship.
Win	34–16–2	Yoshihiko Shinzato	Submission (heel hook)	DEEP: Cage Impact 2016	October 18, 2016	1	0:32	Tokyo, Japan	
Loss	33–16–2	Byeon Jae-eun	Decision (Majority)	DEEP: 77 Impact	August 27, 2016	3	5:00	Tokyo, Japan	
Win	33–15–2	Nam Phan	Submission (heel hook)	DEEP Cage Impact 2016	April 23, 2016	1	0:35	Tokyo, Japan	
Loss	32–15–2	Kazunori Yokota	Decision (unanimous)	DEEP: 74 Impact	December 20, 2015	3	5:00	Tokyo, Japan	
Win	32–14–2	Yang Mun-hwan	Submission (heel hook)	DEEP: Cage Impact 2015	August 29, 2015	1	0:21	Tokyo, Japan	
Win	31–14–2	Cristian Binda	Submission (armbar)	Venator FC: Guerrieri Italiani Finals	May 30, 2015	1	2:33	Bologna, Italy	
Win	30–14–2	Daisuke Maku	Submission (armbar)	DEEP: Hachioji Chojin Matsuri	April 5, 2015	1	4:11	Tokyo, Japan	
Win	29–14–2	Kenichi Ito	Submission (rear-naked choke)	Grandslam MMA 2: Way of the Cage	February 8, 2015	2	4:06	Tokyo, Japan	
Loss	28–14–2	Mizuto Hirota	TKO (punches)	DEEP: 69 Impact	October 26, 2014	2	1:38	Tokyo, Japan	Featherweight bout.
Win	28–13–2	Park Chan-jung	Submission (heel hook)	DEEP: 68 Impact	August 23, 2014	1	0:22	Tokyo, Japan	
Loss	27–13–2	Haruo Ochi	TKO (doctor stoppage)	DEEP: 67 Impact	June 22, 2014	2	0:51	Tokyo, Japan	
Loss	27–12–2	Yuki Motoya	Decision (unanimous)	DEEP: 65 Impact	March 22, 2014	3	5:00	Tokyo, Japan	
Win	27–11–2	Kenichi Ito	Decision (unanimous)	DEEP: 61 Impact	February 16, 2013	2	5:00	Tokyo, Japan	
Win	26–11–2	Masahiro Oishi	Submission (toe hold)	DEEP: 59 Impact	August 18, 2012	1	1:01	Tokyo, Japan	
Loss	25–11–2	Leandro Issa	Decision (unanimous)	ONE FC: Destiny of Warriors	June 23, 2012	3	5:00	Kuala Lumpur, Malaysia	
Win	25–10–2	Kevin Belingon	Submission (reverse heel hook)	ONE FC: War of the Lions	March 31, 2012	1	1:18	Kallang, Singapore	
Loss	24–10–2	Antonio Banuelos	Decision (split)	Fight For Japan: Genki Desu Ka Omisoka 2011	December 31, 2011	2	5:00	Tokyo, Japan	DREAM World Bantamweight Grand Prix Eliminator (Semifinal).
Win	24–9–2	Abel Cullum	Submission (armbar)	Dream 17	September 24, 2011	3	0:46	Saitama, Japan	DREAM World Bantamweight Grand Prix Eliminator (Opening Round).
Loss	23–9–2	Hideo Tokoro	Decision (unanimous)	DREAM: Japan GP Final	July 16, 2011	2	5:00	Tokyo, Japan	DREAM Bantamweight Tournament Final.
Win	23–8–2	Kenji Osawa	Submission (heel hook)	DREAM: Fight for Japan!	May 29, 2011	2	0:58	Saitama, Japan	DREAM Bantamweight Tournament Semifinal.
Win	22–8–2	Keisuke Fujiwara	Decision (unanimous)	DREAM: Fight for Japan!	May 29, 2011	2	5:00	Saitama, Japan	DREAM Bantamweight Tournament Quarterfinal.
Loss	21–8–2	Hiroshi Nakamura	Decision (unanimous)	DEEP: 52 Impact	February 25, 2011	3	5:00	Tokyo, Japan	Non-title bout.
Win	21–7–2	Daiki Hata	Decision (majority)	DEEP: 50 Impact	October 24, 2010	3	5:00	Tokyo, Japan	Non-title bout.
Win	20–7–2	Tomoya Miyashita	Decision (unanimous)	DEEP: 49 Impact	August 27, 2010	3	5:00	Tokyo, Japan	Defended the DEEP Bantamweight Championship.
Win	19–7–2	Isao Terada	Submission (armbar)	DEEP: 47 Impact	April 17, 2010	3	0:27	Tokyo, Japan	
Win	18–7–2	Justin Cruz	Submission (omoplata crossface)	DEEP: Cage Impact 2009	December 19, 2009	1	2:39	Tokyo, Japan	Catchweight (137 lb) bout.
Win	17–7–2	Tomohiko Hori	Decision (unanimous)	DEEP: 43 Impact	August 23, 2009	3	5:00	Tokyo, Japan	Defended the DEEP Bantamweight Championship.
Loss	16–7–2	Bibiano Fernandes	Decision (unanimous)	DREAM 9	May 26, 2009	2	5:00	Saitama, Japan	DREAM Featherweight Grand Prix Quarterfinal.
Win	16–6–2	Atsushi Yamamoto	Decision (split)	DREAM 7	March 8, 2009	2	5:00	Saitama, Japan	Dream Featherweight Grand Prix Opening Round.
Win	15–6–2	Hiroshi Umemura	Submission (heel hook)	DEEP: 37 Impact	August 17, 2008	1	0:29	Tokyo, Japan	Won the inaugural DEEP Bantamweight Championship.
Loss	14–6–2	Dokonjonosuke Mishima	Decision (majority)	DEEP: 35 Impact	May 19, 2008	3	5:00	Tokyo, Japan	Lost the DEEP Featherweight Championship.
Win	14–5–2	Jean Silva	Submission (heel hook)	Cage Rage 25	March 8, 2008	1	2:30	London, England	Defended the Cage Rage Featherweight Championship.
Win	13–5–2	Hiroyuki Abe	Submission (toe hold)	DEEP: 32 Impact	October 9, 2007	3	4:32	Tokyo, Japan	
Win	12–5–2	Kim Jong-Man	Submission (armbar)	DEEP: 31 Impact	August 5, 2007	1	3:28	Tokyo, Japan	Defended the DEEP Featherweight Championship.
Win	11–5–2	Robbie Olivier	Submission (armbar)	Cage Rage 20	February 10, 2007	1	0:27	London, England	Won the inaugural Cage Rage Featherweight Championship.
Win	10–5–2	Takeshi Yamazaki	KO (upkick)	DEEP: 26 Impact	October 10, 2006	3	1:49	Tokyo, Japan	Defended the DEEP Featherweight Championship.
Loss	9–5–2	Fredson Paixão	Decision (majority)	DEEP: 25 Impact	August 4, 2006	3	5:00	Tokyo, Japan	
Win	9–4–2	Yoshiro Maeda	Submission (toe hold)	DEEP: 22 Impact	December 2, 2005	3	1:31	Tokyo, Japan	Won the inaugural DEEP Featherweight Championship. Won the DEEP Featherweight Tournament.
Win	8–4–2	Mike Brown	Submission (rolling kneebar)	DEEP: 22 Impact	December 2, 2005	2	3:38	Tokyo, Japan	DEEP Featherweight Tournament Semifinal.
Win	7–4–2	Fábio Mello	Decision (unanimous)	DEEP: 21st Impact	October 28, 2005	3	5:00	Tokyo, Japan	DEEP Featherweight Tournament Quarterfinal.
Loss	6–4–2	Joachim Hansen	KO (knee)	PRIDE Bushido 8	July 17, 2005	1	2:34	Nagoya, Japan	Lightweight bout.
Draw	6–3–2	Yoshiro Maeda	Draw (majority)	DEEP: 18th Impact	February 5, 2005	3	5:00	Tokyo, Japan	
Win	6–3–1	Renato Tavares	Submission (heel hook)	DEEP: 17th Impact	December 17, 2004	2	2:36	Nagoya, Japan	Return to Featherweight.
Loss	5–3–1	Luiz Firmino	Decision (unanimous)	PRIDE Bushido 5	October 14, 2004	2	5:00	Osaka, Japan	
Loss	5–2–1	Marcus Aurélio	Decision (split)	Zst: Grand Prix Final Round	January 11, 2004	2	5:00	Tokyo, Japan	
Win	5–1–1	Jorge Gurgel	Submission (heel hook)	Zst: Grand Prix Opening Round	November 23, 2003	1	0:32	Tokyo, Japan	
Loss	4–1–1	Dokonjonosuke Mishima	TKO (punches)	DEEP: 11th Impact	July 13, 2003	2	2:58	Osaka, Japan	
Win	4–0–1	Danny Batten	Submission (armbar)	Zst: The Battlefield 3	June 1, 2003	1	0:43	Tokyo, Japan	
Win	3–0–1	Erikas Petraitis	Decision (unanimous)	Zst: The Battlefield 2	June 1, 2003	2	5:00	Tokyo, Japan	
Win	2–0–1	Yuji Oba	Decision (majority)	Pancrase: 2002 Anniversary Show	September 29, 2002	2	5:00	Yokohama, Japan	
Win	1–0–1	Tokusaburo Iwama	Submission (heel hook)	Premium Challenge	May 6, 2002	1	3:24	Tokyo, Japan	
Draw	0–0–1	Ryoji Sai	Technical Draw	Titan Fighting Championship 1	September 29, 2000	1	1:29	Tokyo, Japan	

== Notable Students ==
The following practitioners have been promoted to black belt directly by Masakazu Imanari:

Jonathan Makoto Suzuki is a Brazilian jiu-jitsu black belt under Masakazu Imanari, awarded in 2021. He is an instructor at Imanari Jiu-Jitsu in Tokyo and has taught grappling classes at multiple gyms.

Kazuko is a Brazilian jiu-jitsu practitioner and the first female black belt in Imanari Jiu-Jitsu. She was awarded her black belt under Masakazu Imanari in 2023.

Christian Bajada and Roderick Bajada (also known as the Bajada Brothers) are the head instructors of Jiushin Kan Malta. They were awarded their Brazilian jiu-jitsu black belts under Masakazu Imanari in 2024.

== See also ==
- List of current ONE fighters
