= 2008 in Deep =

Mixed martial arts events

Information
- First date: January 14, 2008
- Last date: December 28, 2008

Events
- Total events: 27

Fights
- Total fights: 281
- Title fights: 9

Chronology
2007 in Deep	2008 in Deep	2009 in Deep

The year 2008 was the 8th year in the history of Deep, a mixed martial arts promotion based in Japan. In 2008 Deep held 27 events beginning with, Deep: 28 Impact.

== Title fights ==
Title fights in 2008
Weight class				Method	Round	Time	Event	Notes
Flyweight	Satoko Shinashi	def.	Sachiko Yamamoto	Submission (Armbar)	1	3:58	Deep: 34 Impact	(Note: For the Deep Women's Flyweight Championship.)
Middleweight	Yuichi Nakanishi	def.	Riki Fukuda	Decision (Unanimous)	2	5:00	Deep: 35 Impact	(Note: For the Deep Middleweight Championship.)
Featherweight	Dokonjonosuke Mishima	def.	Masakazu Imanari (c)	Decision (Majority)	3	5:00	Deep: 35 Impact	(Note: For the Deep Featherweight Championship.)
Lightweight	Tae Hyun Bang	def.	Kazunori Yokota (c)	KO (Punches)	1	3:38	Deep: 35 Impact	(Note: For the Deep Lightweight Championship.)
Welterweight	Seichi Ikemoto	def.	Hidehiko Hasegawa (c)	Decision (Unanimous)	3	5:00	Deep: 36 Impact	(Note: For the Deep Welterweight Championship.)
Megatonweight	Yusuke Kawaguchi	def.	Shunsuke Inoue	Decision (Split)	2	4:00	Deep: Megaton Grand Prix 2008 Finals	(Note: For the Deep Megatonweight Championship.)
Bantamweight	Masakazu Imanari	def.	Hiroshi Umemura	Submission (Heel Hook)	1	0:29	Deep: 37 Impact	(Note: For the Deep Bantamweight Championship.)
Lightweight	Miku Matsumoto (c)	def.	Misaki Takimoto	TKO (Kicks to the Body)	2	4:40	Deep: 37 Impact	(Note: For the Deep Women's Lightweight Championship.)
Megatonweight	Yusuke Kawaguchi (c)	def.	Baru Harn	Decision (Majority)	2	5:00	Deep: 38 Impact	(Note: For the Deep Megatonweight Championship.)

== Events list ==
#	Event title	Date	Arena	Location
98	Deep: Future King Tournament 2008	December 28, 2008	Gold's Gym South Tokyo Annex	Tokyo
97	Deep: Protect Impact 2008	December 22, 2008	Shinjuku Face	Tokyo
96	Deep: 39 Impact	December 10, 2008	Korakuen Hall	Tokyo
95	Deep: Double Impact	December 6, 2008	Osaka Prefectural Gymnasium	Osaka
94	Deep: Kobudo Fight 5	November 30, 2008	Kobudo Martial Arts Communication Space Tiger Hall	Nagoya
93	Deep: 38 Impact	October 23, 2008	Korakuen Hall	Tokyo
92	Deep: clubDeep Hamamatsu	September 28, 2008	Act City	Hamamatsu
91	Deep: Glove Amateur	September 20, 2008	Shinjuku Face	Tokyo
90	Deep: Glove 3	September 20, 2008	Shinjuku Face	Tokyo
89	Deep: Kobudo Fight 4	September 13, 2008	Kobudo Martial Arts Communication Space Tiger Hall	Nagoya
88	Deep: clubDeep Kyoto	August 30, 2008	Terrsa Hall	Kyoto
87	Deep: 37 Impact	August 17, 2008	Korakuen Hall	Tokyo
86	Deep: Gladiator	August 16, 2008	Momotaro Arena	Okayama
85	Deep: Megaton Grand Prix 2008 Finals	August 2, 2008	Shinjuku Face	Tokyo
84	Deep: 36 Impact	July 27, 2008	Zepp Osaka	Osaka
83	Deep: clubDeep Nagoya: MB3z Impact, All Stand Up	June 29, 2008	Zepp Nagoya	Nagoya
82	Deep: Glove 2	June 15, 2008	Shinjuku Face	Tokyo
81	Deep: clubDeep Toyama: Barbarian Festival 7	June 1, 2008	Toyama Event Plaza	Toyama
80	Deep: clubDeep Tokyo	May 24, 2008	Shinjuku Face	Tokyo
79	Deep: Megaton Grand Prix 2008 Semifinal	May 24, 2008	Shinjuku Face	Tokyo
78	Deep: 35 Impact	May 19, 2008	Korakuen Hall	Tokyo
77	Deep: Kobudo Fight 3	April 20, 2008	Kobudo Martial Arts Communication Space Tiger Hall	Nagoya
76	Deep: Megaton Grand Prix 2008 Opening Round	March 29, 2008	Shinjuku Face	Tokyo
75	Deep: clubDeep Tokyo	March 29, 2008	Shinjuku Face	Tokyo
74	Deep: 34 Impact	February 22, 2008	Korakuen Hall	Tokyo
73	Deep: Kobudo Fight 2	February 17, 2008	Kobudo Martial Arts Communication Space Tiger Hall	Nagoya
72	Deep: Future King Tournament 2007	January 14, 2008	Shinjuku Face	Tokyo

== Deep: Future King Tournament 2007 ==
Deep: Future King Tournament 2007 was an event held on January 14, 2008, at Shinjuku Face in Tokyo.

=== Results ===
Main Card
Weight class				Method	Round	Time	Notes
	Kintaro Tsurukame	def.	Katsumi Yamada	TKO (Punches)	1	2:18
	Yoshiyuki Nakanishi	def.	Yoshiyuki Kato	KO (Punch)	1	0:56
	Yusuke Gondai	def.	Tomoichiro Iwakami	Submission (Guillotine Choke)	1	1:34
	Yuki Ito	def.	Hiroshi Nakano	KO (Punch)	1	1:01
	Tomoya Miyashita	def.	Masaaki Izena	Submission (Guillotine Choke)	1	0:41
	Tomoyoshi Iwamiya	def.	Dai Moriyama	Submission (Rear-Naked Choke)	2	3:35
	Seiji Akao	def.	Makoto Akazawa	Submission (Punches)	1	2:32
	Seigo Inoue	def.	Kenta Okuyama	KO (Kick to the Body)	2	0:52
	Tetsuya Yoshioka	def.	Hidenobu Koike	Decision (Split)	2	5:00
	Hiromu Nagado	def.	Masaya Doi	Decision (Split)	2	5:00
	Ippo Watanuki	def.	Yasuhiro Motomura	Submission (Heel Hook)	1	1:55
	Sadao Kondo	def.	Daigo Ishijima	Decision (Unanimous)	2	5:00
	Makoto Akazawa	def.	Masaki Yanagisawa	TKO (Punches)	2	1:18
	Seiji Akao	def.	Makoto Kamaya	Decision (Unanimous)	1	5:00
	Makoto Akazawa	def.	Kota Ishibashi	Decision (Unanimous)	1	5:00
	Masaki Yanagisawa	def.	Takuya Ogura	Submission (Rear-Naked Choke)	1	4:13
	Seiji Akao	def.	Tatsumitsu Wada	Decision (Split)	1	5:00
	Makoto Kamaya	def.	Tsubasa Akiyama	Decision (Unanimous)	1	5:00
	Seigo Inoue	def.	Luiz Andrade I	Submission (Flying Armbar)	1	2:49
	Kazumasa Otani	def.	Yuya Osugi	Decision (Unanimous)	1	5:00
	Luiz Andrade I	def.	Yusuke Suzuki	Submission (Armbar)	1	1:48
	Hidenobu Koike	def.	Junzo Tokuda	Decision (Split)	2	5:00
	Tetsuya Yoshioka	def.	Kunio Iwasaki	Decision (Unanimous)	1	5:00
	Junzo Tokuda	def.	Yoshiki Ishida	Decision (Unanimous)	1	5:00
	Tetsuya Yoshioka	def.	Masahiro Ono	Decision (Unanimous)	1	5:00
	Hiromu Nagado	def.	Yuichi Kishino	TKO (Punches)	1	1:03
	Masaya Doi	def.	Teruhiko Kubo	TKO (Punches)	1	0:29

== Deep: Kobudo Fight 2 ==
Deep: Kobudo Fight 2 was an event held on February 17, 2008, at Kobudo Martial Arts Communication Space Tiger Hall in Nagoya.

=== Results ===
Main Card
Weight class				Method	Round	Time	Notes
	Shinichiro Tanaka	vs.	Toru Eto	Draw	2	5:00
	Atsushi Uozumi	vs.	Yoshinobu Kawamura	Draw	2	5:00
	Masaru Kadowaki	vs.	Fuhito Hasegawa	Draw	2	5:00
	Takashi Fujii	def.	Motofumi Suzuki	Submission (Kimura)	2	2:49

== Deep: 34 Impact ==
Deep: 34 Impact was an event held on February 22, 2008, at Korakuen Hall in Tokyo.

=== Results ===
Main Card
Weight class				Method	Round	Time	Notes
	Yuya Shirai	def.	Sojiro Orui	Decision (Unanimous)	3	5:00
	Daijiro Matsui	def.	Young Choi	Decision (Split)	3	5:00
	Yuichi Nakanishi	def.	Eiji Ishikawa	Decision (Split)	3	5:00
	Riki Fukuda	def.	Ryuta Sakurai	Decision (Unanimous)	3	5:00
Flyweight	Satoko Shinashi	def.	Sachiko Yamamoto	Submission (Armbar)	1	3:58	(Note: For the Deep Women's Flyweight Championship.)
	Yasuhito Namekawa	def.	Carlos Toyota	Submission (Achilles Lock)	1	2:58
	Yoshihiro Tomioka	vs.	Seigo Inoue	Draw	2	5:00
	Toshiaki Kitada	vs.	Isao Terada	Draw	2	5:00
	Ken Hamamura	vs.	Shigetoshi Iwase	Draw	2	5:00
	Yoshiyuki Nakanishi	def.	Shunsuke Inoue	Decision (Unanimous)	2	5:00
	Satoko Shinashi	def.	Fukuko Hamada	Decision (Unanimous)	2	5:00
	Sachiko Yamamoto	def.	Kayo Nagayasu	Submission (Armbar)	2	2:01
	Ryoji Suzuki	def.	Kenta Okuyama	Submission (Rear-Naked Choke)	2	2:08

== Deep: clubDeep Tokyo ==
Deep: clubDeep Tokyo was an event held on March 29, 2008, at Shinjuku Face in Tokyo.

=== Results ===
Main Card
Weight class				Method	Round	Time	Notes
	Tae Hyun Bang	def.	Luiz Andrade I	Decision (Unanimous)	2	5:00
	Ryan Bow	vs.	Naoki Matsushita	Draw	2	5:00
	Yasushi Kitazaki	def.	Tsuneyoshi Kashimura	Decision (Split)	2	5:00
	Kosei Kubota	def.	Teruhiko Kubo	Decision (Unanimous)	2	5:00
	Yuki Inoue	def.	Yoshitomo Watanabe	Decision (Majority)	2	5:00
	Ippo Watanuki	def.	Isao Terada	Decision (Unanimous)	2	5:00
	Tomoya Miyashita	def.	Tatsumitsu Wada	KO (Punch)	2	2:10
	Tetsuya Yoshioka	def.	Kenji Ushioda	Decision (Unanimous)	2	5:00
	Sadao Kondo	def.	Shingo Matsuda	Decision (Unanimous)	2	5:00
	Guy Delumeau	def.	Hideo Matsui	TKO (Punches)	2	4:02

== Deep: Megaton Grand Prix 2008 Opening Round ==
Deep: Megaton Grand Prix 2008 Opening Round was an event held on March 29, 2008, at Shinjuku Face in Tokyo.

=== Results ===
Main Card
Weight class				Method	Round	Time	Notes
	Yusuke Kawaguchi	def.	Nobuyoshi Takahara	TKO (Punches)	1	0:40
	Mamoru Nakamura	def.	Muscle Hiranuma	Decision (Unanimous)	2	3:00
	Yoichi Babaguchi	def.	Kintaro Tsurukame	TKO (Submission to punches)	1	1:22
	Shunsuke Inoue	def.	Ryosuke Kojima	Decision (Unanimous)	2	3:00
	Katsuhiko Kumano	def.	Itomo Ariyama	Decision (Split)	2	3:00
	Ken Orihashi	def.	Kazuki Nojiri	Decision (Unanimous)	2	3:00
	Shunji Kosaka	def.	Tadahiro Hosaka	Decision (Unanimous)	2	3:00
	Katsumi Yamada	def.	Muneyuki Suzuki	TKO (Punches)	1	0:37
	Yoshito Takahashi	def.	Hiroshi Kiyohara	TKO (Punches)	1	1:24

== Deep: Kobudo Fight 3 ==
Deep: Kobudo Fight 3 was an event held on April 20, 2008, at Kobudo Martial Arts Communication Space Tiger Hall in Nagoya.

=== Results ===
Main Card
Weight class				Method	Round	Time	Notes
	Takao Nakajima	def.	Masaru Kadowaki	KO (Slam)	2	2:35
	Fuhito Hasegawa	def.	Hiroyuki Tsuzuki	TKO (Punches)	2	4:47
	Koichi Gomi	def.	Yasuhiro Suzuki	TKO (Punches)	1	1:17

== Deep: 35 Impact ==
Deep: 35 Impact was an event held on May 19, 2008, at Korakuen Hall in Tokyo.

=== Results ===
Main Card
Weight class				Method	Round	Time	Notes
Middleweight	Yuichi Nakanishi	def.	Riki Fukuda	Decision (Unanimous)	2	5:00	(Note: For the Deep Middleweight Championship.)
Featherweight	Dokonjonosuke Mishima	def.	Masakazu Imanari (c)	Decision (Majority)	3	5:00	(Note: For the Deep Featherweight Championship.)
Lightweight	Tae Hyun Bang	def.	Kazunori Yokota (c)	KO (Punches)	1	3:38	(Note: For the Deep Lightweight Championship.)
	Hiroki Nagaoka	vs.	Hidehiko Hasegawa	Draw	2	5:00
	Mai Ichii	def.	Satoko Shinashi	Decision (Majority)	2	5:00
	Jutaro Nakao	def.	Shigetoshi Iwase	Decision (Unanimous)	2	5:00
	Katsunori Kikuno	def.	Seigo Inoue	Decision (Unanimous)	2	5:00
	Ryuta Sakurai	def.	Young Choi	Decision (Unanimous)	2	5:00
	Riki Fukuda	def.	Yuya Shirai	Decision (Split)	2	5:00
	Yuichi Nakanishi	def.	Daijiro Matsui	Decision (Unanimous)	2	5:00
	Luiz Andrade I	def.	Toshikazu Iseno	KO (Punches)	2	0:41
	Koichiro Matsumoto	def.	Yuki Ito	Decision (Majority)	2	5:00
	Hyun Gyu Lim	def.	Noboru Onishi	TKO (Doctor Stoppage)	2	0:48
	Yasuhiro Kawasaki	def.	Muneyuki Sato	TKO (Punches)	1	2:49

== Deep: Megaton Grand Prix 2008 Semifinal ==
Deep: Megaton Grand Prix 2008 Semifinal was an event held on May 24, 2008, at Shinjuku Face in Tokyo.

=== Results ===
Main Card
Weight class				Method	Round	Time	Notes
	Shunsuke Inoue	def.	Katsumi Yamada	TKO (Punches)	1	1:33
	Yusuke Kawaguchi	def.	Yoichi Babaguchi	TKO (Punches)	1	0:16
	Shunji Kosaka	def.	Katsuhiko Kumano	TKO (Punches)	1	0:10
	Ken Orihashi	def.	Mamoru Nakamura	TKO (Punches)	1	4:36
	Kosaku Shikimasu	def.	Itomo Ariyama	KO (Knee)	1	0:54
	Kazuki Nojiri	def.	Mitsumasa Matsumoto	Decision (Unanimous)	2	4:00

== Deep: clubDeep Tokyo ==
Deep: clubDeep Tokyo was an event held on May 24, 2008, at Shinjuku Face in Tokyo.

=== Results ===
Main Card
Weight class				Method	Round	Time	Notes
	Misaki Takimoto	def.	Naoko Omuro	Decision (Unanimous)	2	5:00
	Toshiaki Kitada	vs.	Ippo Watanuki	Draw	2	5:00
	Yasushi Kitazaki	def.	Sotaro Yamada	Decision (Split)	2	5:00
	Takafumi Otsuka	def.	Isamu Sugiuchi	TKO (Slam and Punches)	1	3:51
	Yoshitomo Watanabe	vs.	Ryoji Suzuki	Draw	2	5:00
	Kazuya Hirose	def.	Guy Delumeau	KO (Spinning Back Fist)	1	1:40

== Deep: clubDeep Toyama: Barbarian Festival 7 ==
Deep: clubDeep Toyama: Barbarian Festival 7 was an event held on June 1, 2008, at The Toyama Event Plaza in Toyama.

=== Results ===
Main Card
Weight class				Method	Round	Time	Notes
	Yoshihiro Tomioka	def.	Takahiro Kajita	Submission (Kimura)	2	2:59
	Akira Kibe	def.	Masayuki Demise	Decision (Majority)	2	5:00
	Yuichi Ikari	def.	Kosuke Umeda	Decision (Unanimous)	2	5:00
	Yuya Osugi	def.	Shinichiro Tanaka	Decision (Majority)	2	5:00
	Teruhiko Kubo	def.	Tamotsu Kitada	Submission (Armbar)	2	0:49
	Akimitsu Tsuchiya	def.	Yoshinobu Kawamura	TKO (Punches)	2	2:24
	Negao Negao	def.	Kazumasa Sakakibara	TKO (Punches)	1	0:17
	Daisuke Orito	def.	Takao Nakajima	KO (Punches)	1	0:07
	Yosuke Yosuke	vs.	Masato Sekikawa	Draw	2	5:00
	Satoshi Shimono	def.	Tomofumi Nakamura	KO (Punch)	2	0:10
	Yoshimoto Yoshimoto	def.	Hiroshi Sato	Decision (Unanimous)	2	5:00

== Deep: Glove 2 ==
Deep: Glove 2 was an event held on June 15, 2008, at Shinjuku Face in Tokyo.

=== Results ===
Main Card
Weight class				Method	Round	Time	Notes
	Yuki Okano	def.	Takashi Ono	TKO (Punches)	1	4:41
	Hikaru Shinohara	def.	Kiraan Kiraan	Submission (Rear-Naked Choke)	1	3:26
	Rage Nambu	def.	Hiroaki Chishima	TKO (Corner Stoppage)	1	2:00
	Kazuya Tamura	def.	Kota Ishibashi	Decision (Unanimous)	2	5:00
	Tatsuya Nakama	def.	Yoshinori Takahashi	Submission (Ankle Lock)	2	4:09
	Shinya Takeda	def.	Dan Dan	TKO	2	2:08
	Yoko Yamada	def.	Nana Ichikawa	KO (Punches)	1	1:00

== Deep: clubDeep Nagoya: MB3z Impact, All Stand Up ==
Deep: clubDeep Nagoya: MB3z Impact, All Stand Up was an event held on June 29, 2008, at Zepp Nagoya in Nagoya.

=== Results ===
Main Card
Weight class				Method	Round	Time	Notes
	Ryan Bow	def.	Naoki Matsushita	Decision (Unanimous)	3	5:00
	Hiroshi Umemura	def.	Kunihiro Watanabe	Submission (Rear Naked Choke)	1	1:19
	Henri Kakiuchi	def.	Atsuhiro Tsuboi	Decision (Unanimous)	2	5:00
	Naoki Kimura	vs.	Hiromu Nagado	Draw	2	5:00
	Takeshi Matsushita	vs.	Hideo Matsui	Draw	2	5:00
	Seiji Akao	def.	Tatsumitsu Wada	Decision (Majority)	2	5:00
	Hiroyuki Tsuzuki	def.	Ryota Matsui	TKO (Punches)	2	2:24
	Noriyuki Takeuchi	vs.	Ryusaku Mishina	Draw	2	5:00

== Deep: 36 Impact ==
Deep: 36 Impact was an event held on July 27, 2008, at Zepp Osaka in Osaka.

=== Results ===
Main Card
Weight class				Method	Round	Time	Notes
Welterweight	Seichi Ikemoto	def.	Hidehiko Hasegawa (c)	Decision (Unanimous)	3	5:00	(Note: For the Deep Welterweight Championship.)
	Young Choi	def.	Takenori Sato	Decision (Majority)	2	5:00
	Seigo Mizuguchi	def.	Nobuyoshi Takahara	Submission (Armbar)	1	1:41
	Masanori Tonooka	def.	Hidehira Yabu	KO (Punch)	1	3:37
	Yoshinobu Kawamura	def.	Junzo Tokunaga	TKO (Punches)	1	3:22
	Toru Harai	def.	Isao Terada	Decision (Split)	2	5:00
	Hiroto Hattori	def.	Nobuhiro Yoshitake	Decision (Unanimous)	2	5:00
	Yasuko Tamada	def.	Fukuko Hamada	Decision (Unanimous)	2	5:00
	Yasunori Kanehara	def.	Hiroshi Shiba	TKO (Punches)	2	0:19
	Yuki Uejima	def.	Makoto Kamaya	Decision (Majority)	2	5:00
	Yuya Aikawa	def.	Miyamonta Miyamonta	TKO (Punches)	1	2:23
	Yasuaki Kishimoto	def.	Reisho Shoda	TKO (Punches)	1	3:52

== Deep: Megaton Grand Prix 2008 Finals ==
Deep: Megaton Grand Prix 2008 Finals was an event held on August 2, 2008, at Shinjuku Face in Tokyo.

=== Results ===
Main Card
Weight class				Method	Round	Time	Notes
Megatonweight	Yusuke Kawaguchi	def.	Shunsuke Inoue	Decision (Split)	2	4:00	(Note: For the Deep Megatonweight Championship.)
	Sotaro Yamada	vs.	Ryoji Suzuki	Draw	2	5:00
	Katsumi Yamada	def.	Mamoru Nakamura	KO (Punch)	1	5:00
	Yusuke Kawaguchi	def.	Shunji Kosaka	TKO (Corner Stoppage)	1	0:45
	Shunsuke Inoue	def.	Ken Orihashi	Submission (Armbar)	1	4:44

== Deep: Gladiator ==
Deep: Gladiator was an event held on August 16, 2008, at Momotaro Arena in Okayama.

=== Results ===
Main Card
Weight class				Method	Round	Time	Notes
	Ikuhisa Minowa	def.	Don Frye	Submission (Kneebar)	1	3:56
	Eun-Su Lee	def.	Daijiro Matsui	Decision (Unanimous)	3	5:00
	Sang Soo Lee	def.	Katsuhisa Fujii	TKO (Punches)	1	4:36
	Jutaro Nakao	def.	Yong Hoon Lee	TKO (Punches)	2	2:26
	Chan Sung Jung	def.	Michihiro Omigawa	Decision (Unanimous)	2	5:00
	Min Suk Heo	def.	Hikaru Sato	TKO (Corner Stoppage)	1	1:08
	Tae Kyun Kim	def.	Akihiko Mori	Decision (Unanimous)	2	5:00
	Yusuke Sakashita	def.	Minoru Kato	TKO (Punches)	2	2:43

== Deep: 37 Impact ==
Deep: 37 Impact was an event held on August 17, 2008, at Korakuen Hall in Tokyo.

=== Results ===
Main Card
Weight class				Method	Round	Time	Notes
Bantamweight	Masakazu Imanari	def.	Hiroshi Umemura	Submission (Heel Hook)	1	0:29	(Note: For the Deep Bantamweight Championship.)
Lightweight	Miku Matsumoto (c)	def.	Misaki Takimoto	TKO (Kicks to the Body)	2	4:40	(Note: For the Deep Women's Lightweight Championship.)
	Jong Man Kim	vs.	Daiki Hata	Draw	3	5:00
	Ryuta Sakurai	def.	Kozo Urita	Submission (Armbar)	1	3:22
	Yasuhito Namekawa	def.	Claudio Silva	Submission (Armbar)	1	2:59
	Katsunori Kikuno	def.	Yoshihiro Tomioka	TKO (Punches)	2	2:34
	Eiji Ishikawa	def.	Kosei Kubota	TKO (Punches)	2	0:55
	Riki Fukuda	def.	Hiroki Ozaki	Decision (Unanimous)	2	5:00
	Koichiro Matsumoto	def.	Seigo Inoue	TKO (Punch)	2	1:32
	Yusaku Tsukumo	def.	Yasushi Kitazaki	Submission (Rear-Naked Choke)	1	3:04
	Shinobu Miura	vs.	Luiz Andrade I	Draw	2	5:00
	Evgeny Maximkin	def.	Jun Soo Lim	Submission (Achilles Lock)	1	3:08
	Muneyuki Sato	def.	Yuya Osugi	TKO (Punches)	2	3:00
	Kenta Takagi	def.	Makoto Kawawa	TKO (Punches)	1	1:22
	Tomohiro Ishii	def.	Teppei Hori	TKO (Punches)	1	1:22

== Deep: clubDeep Kyoto ==
Deep: clubDeep Kyoto was an event held on August 30, 2008, at Terrsa Hall in Kyoto.

=== Results ===
Main Card
Weight class				Method	Round	Time	Notes
	Takahiro Kajita	vs.	Tomoyuki Fukami	Draw	2	5:00
	Ken Hamamura	def.	Hyun Joo Kim	TKO (Corner Stoppage)	1	2:40
	Hiromu Nagado	def.	Miya Mo	Submission (Kimura)	1	4:02
	Bum Chan Kang	def.	Marcelo Nakamura	TKO (Punches)	2	4:56
	Makoto Kamaya	def.	Hiroto Hattori	Decision (Majority)	2	5:00
	Atsushi Kondo	def.	Ricardo Algusto	TKO (Punches)	1	1:26
	Yasuaki Kishimoto	def.	Tetsuya Fukunaga	Submission (Rear-Naked Choke)	2	0:49
	Masahiko Uechi	vs.	Noriyuki Takeuchi	Draw	2	5:00
	Yusuke Hoshiko	def.	Hiroki Kanayama	Decision (Majority)	2	5:00

== Deep: Kobudo Fight 4 ==
Deep: Kobudo Fight 4 was an event held on September 13, 2008, at Kobudo Martial Arts Communication Space Tiger Hall in Nagoya.

=== Results ===
Main Card
Weight class				Method	Round	Time	Notes
	Tomohiro Ishii	def.	Toshinari Takashima	Submission (Rear-Naked Choke)	1	0:53
	Jun Kito	vs.	Yasutomo Katsuki	Draw	2	5:00
	Hiroshi Sato	def.	Katsuya Ishida	TKO (Punches)	2	1:36
	Yoshiaki Tamazawa	def.	Satoshi Shimono	Technical Submission (Omoplata)	1	1:54
	Futoshi Isami	def.	Carlos Oliveira	TKO (Punches)	1	2:37
	Naoyuki Kato	def.	Seita Yabe	Submission (Rear-Naked Choke)	1	4:21

== Deep: Glove 3 ==
Deep: Glove 3 was an event held on September 20, 2008, at Shinjuku Face in Tokyo.

=== Results ===
Main Card
Weight class				Method	Round	Time	Notes
	Hidenobu Koike	def.	Hiroaki Sakuma	Decision (Unanimous)	2	5:00
	Aya Aya	vs.	Sachiko Togashi	Draw	1	3:00
	Hiroki Kuga	def.	Koki Ijima	Submission (Rear-Naked Choke)	1	0:25
	Clan Chihiro	def.	Zombie Nishiyama	Submission (Guillotine Choke)	1	0:55

== Deep: Glove Amateur ==
Deep: Glove Amateur was an event held on September 20, 2008, at Shinjuku Face in Tokyo.

=== Results ===
Main Card
Weight class				Method	Round	Time	Notes
	Tomi Yamaguchi	def.	Koyu Ueda	KO (Punch)	1	0:08
	Tetsuya Sano	def.	Kensaku Nakamura	Decision (Majority)	1	5:00
	Yasuhiro Sakahara	def.	Yoshio Kawabata	Decision (Unanimous)	1	5:00
	Toshiki Iwasaki	def.	Atsushi Ibe	Submission (Armbar)	1	2:56
	Ryosuke Komori	def.	Masahiro Watanabe	Submission (Rear-Naked Choke)	1	0:42
	Ben Henry	vs.	Hiroki Iguchi	Draw	1	5:00
	Kazuki Itaya	def.	Hideki Ito	Decision (Unanimous)	1	5:00
	Tatsunao Nagakura	def.	Toru Nakamura	TKO (Punches)	1	1:17
	Motoki Awaji	def.	Kenji Kawabata	Submission (Armbar)	1	2:28
	Shoji Kogane	def.	Hikaru Nagaseki	Decision (Unanimous)	1	5:00
	Kotaku Kawazu	def.	Takefumi Kosuge	Decision (Unanimous)	1	5:00
	Mitsuhiko Ikezaki	def.	Ryo Iseki	Decision (Unanimous)	1	5:00
	Yoshikazu Kanari	def.	Satoshi Teruoka	Submission (Armbar)	1	0:31
	Shoichi Mihashi	def.	Shinobu Goto	Decision (Majority)	1	5:00
	Shota Utsunomiya	def.	Yojiro Daicho	Submission (Rear-Naked Choke)	1	0:55
	Nanako Yamaseki	def.	Yuko Oya	Decision (Unanimous)	1	5:00
	Taketo Inamoto	vs.	Kensaku Nakamura	Draw	1	5:00
	Shun Yoshioka	def.	Ben Henry	Submission (Arm-Triangle Choke)	1	0:36
	Gotaku Hisada	def.	Koji Nohara	KO (Punch)	1	4:55

== Deep: clubDeep Hamamatsu ==
Deep: clubDeep Hamamatsu was an event held on September 28, 2008, at Act City in Hamamatsu.

=== Results ===
Main Card
Weight class				Method	Round	Time	Notes
	Carlos Toyota	def.	Kazuki Nojiri	TKO (Punches)	1	1:23
	Adelberto Vidal	def.	Takayuki Muramatsu	Submission (Rear-Naked Choke)	1	2:53
	Tomoaki Hata	def.	Salvador Minniti	Submission (Punches)	2	0:47
	Edison Salman Mishio	vs.	Yusuke Suzuki	Draw	2	5:00
	Ikkei Nagamura	def.	Shinichiro Arai	TKO (Punches)	1	0:36
	Atsuhiro Tsuboi	def.	Roberto Brito	Decision (Unanimous)	2	5:00
	Akira Kibe	def.	Kunihiro Watanabe	Submission (Rear-Naked Choke)	1	0:36
	Marlon Medeiros	def.	Ryota Matsui	KO (Punches)	1	2:31
	Takao Nakajima	vs.	Hitoshi Ogasawara	Draw	2	5:00
	Naoki Umehara	def.	Fuhito Hasegawa	Decision (Unanimous)	2	5:00
	Kleber Koike Erbst	def.	Masaki Wada	Submission (Rear-Naked Choke)	1	1:11
	Anderson Shiroma Miura	def.	Yoshito Uehara	TKO (Punches)	1	3:55

== Deep: 38 Impact ==
Deep: 38 Impact was an event held on October 23, 2008, at Korakuen Hall in Tokyo.

=== Results ===
Main Card
Weight class				Method	Round	Time	Notes
	Katsuyori Shibata	vs.	Yasuhito Namekawa	Draw	3	5:00
	Ryuta Sakurai	def.	Sojiro Orui	Decision (Split)	2	5:00
Megatonweight	Yusuke Kawaguchi (c)	def.	Baru Harn	Decision (Majority)	2	5:00	(Note: For the Deep Megatonweight Championship.)
	Satoko Shinashi	def.	Yukiko Seki	Submission (Armbar)	1	1:32
	Riki Fukuda	def.	Jason Jones	Decision (Unanimous)	2	5:00
	Takafumi Otsuka	def.	Masanori Kanehara	Decision (Split)	2	5:00
	Eiji Ishikawa	def.	Simeon Thoresen	Decision (Majority)	2	5:00
	Toshikazu Iseno	def.	Masayuki Okude	Decision (Unanimous)	2	5:00
	Shunji Kosaka	def.	Seigo Mizuguchi	TKO (Punches)	1	3:30
	Koichiro Matsumoto	def.	Ryan Bow	Decision (Unanimous)	2	5:00
	Yasuaki Kishimoto	vs.	Norio Tokuhisa	Draw	2	5:00
	Yasuhiro Kawasaki	vs.	Yuki Tokushige	Draw	2	5:00

== Deep: Kobudo Fight 5 ==
Deep: Kobudo Fight 5 was an event held on November 30, 2008, at Kobudo Martial Arts Communication Space Tiger Hall in Nagoya.

=== Results ===
Main Card
Weight class				Method	Round	Time	Notes
	Atsushi Tamagusugu	def.	Shinichiro Tanaka	KO (Slam)	1	4:28
	Hiroshi Shinagawa	vs.	Takao Nakajima	Draw	2	5:00
	Hidetaka Naka	def.	Naoyuki Kato	Submission (Rear-Naked Choke)	2	0:42
	Kozaburo Muramatsu	def.	Keita Yoshikawa	Submission (Armbar)	1	3:30
	Naoki Kawai	def.	Motofumi Suzuki	Submission (Armbar)	1	4:42

== Deep: Double Impact ==
Deep: Double Impact was an event held on December 6, 2008, at Osaka Prefectural Gymnasium in Osaka.

=== Results ===
Main Card
Weight class				Method	Round	Time	Notes
	Hiroto Hattori	def.	Nobuhiro Yoshitake	Decision (Unanimous)	2	5:00
	Hiroto Hattori	def.	Makoto Kamaya	Decision (Split)	2	5:00
	Nobuhiro Yoshitake	def.	Kazuya Kazuya	Decision (Unanimous)	2	5:00

== Deep: 39 Impact ==
Deep: 39 Impact was an event held on December 10, 2008, at Korakuen Hall in Tokyo.

=== Results ===
Main Card
Weight class				Method	Round	Time	Notes
	Nobuhiro Obiya	def.	Yoshihiro Tomioka	TKO (Punches)	2	2:35
	Yuya Shirai	def.	Yuichi Nakanishi	Decision (Unanimous)	3	5:00
	Takafumi Otsuka	def.	Shoji Maruyama	Decision (Unanimous)	3	5:00
	Daiki Hata	def.	Naoya Uematsu	TKO (Punches)	1	2:30
	Katsunori Kikuno	def.	Jang Yong Kim	Decision (Unanimous)	2	5:00
	Chan Sung Jung	def.	Fanjin Son	KO (Punches)	1	0:17
	Seigo Inoue	def.	Toshikazu Iseno	Decision (Unanimous)	2	5:00
	Shunsuke Inoue	vs.	Kazuhisa Tazawa	Draw	2	5:00
	Yukiya Naito	def.	Yuta Watanabe	TKO (Punches)	1	1:25
	Yusaku Tsukumo	def.	Hidenobu Koike	TKO (Corner Stoppage)	1	5:00
	Luiz Andrade I	def.	Shinobu Miura	Decision (Majority)	2	5:00
	Satoshi Inaba	def.	Yasuhiro Sakahara	TKO (Punches)	2	1:48

== Deep: Protect Impact 2008 ==
Deep: Protect Impact 2008 was an event held on December 22, 2008, at Shinjuku Face in Tokyo.

=== Results ===
Main Card
Weight class				Method	Round	Time	Notes
	Dokonjonosuke Mishima	def.	Toshiaki Kitada	TKO (Punches)	2	2:51
	Miku Matsumoto	def.	Hikaru Shinohara	Submission (Armbar)	1	1:00
	Seigo Mizuguchi	def.	Ken Orihashi	KO (Punch)	1	3:13
	Hirokazu Konno	def.	Yuma Ishizuka	Decision (Unanimous)	2	5:00
	Toru Harai	def.	Ippo Watanuki	Decision (Unanimous)	2	5:00
	Seiji Akao	def.	Tatsumitsu Wada	Decision (Unanimous)	2	5:00
	Isao Terada	def.	Masaki Yokoyama	Decision (Unanimous)	2	5:00
	Tomohiko Hori	def.	Toshihiro Shimizu	Decision (Unanimous)	2	5:00
	Yusuke Masuda	vs.	Hiroki Sato	Draw	2	5:00
	Sadao Kondo	def.	Kazuya Hirose	TKO (Punches)	2	3:55

== Deep: Future King Tournament 2008 ==
Deep: Future King Tournament 2008 was an event held on December 28, 2008, at Gold's Gym South Tokyo Annex in Tokyo.

=== Results ===
Main Card
Weight class				Method	Round	Time	Notes
	Teruhiko Kubo	def.	Yusuke Horimoto	Submission (Armbar)	1	3:03
	Yasuaki Kishimoto	def.	Akihiro Ono	TKO (Punches)	1	4:48
	Tatsunao Nagakura	def.	Ohiro Omiyama	TKO (Punches)	1	1:15
	Shota Utsunomiya	def.	Yu Hosokawa	Submission (Armbar)	1	2:46
	Ryosuke Komori	def.	Yuki Ueshima	Submission (Rear-Naked Choke)	1	0:47
	Akihiro Ono	def.	Akimitsu Tsuchiya	Submission (Guillotine Choke)	1	2:26
	Yasuaki Kishimoto	def.	Hiroaki Sakuma	Submission (Triangle Choke)	1	2:31
	Ohiro Omiyama	def.	Hideo Matsui	Decision (Unanimous)	1	5:00
	Tatsunao Nagakura	def.	Hikaru Nagaseki	TKO (Punches)	1	0:37
	Shota Utsunomiya	def.	Kenichi Ogura	Decision (Unanimous)	1	5:00
	Yu Hosokawa	def.	Taketo Inamoto	Decision (Split)	1	5:00
	Ryosuke Komori	def.	Hiroyuki Kobayashi	Submission (Heel Hook)	1	0:53
	Yuki Ueshima	def.	Shohei Kondo	Submission (Arm-Triangle Choke)	1	2:33
	Akihiro Ono	def.	William Lanning	Decision (Unanimous)	1	5:00
	Akimitsu Tsuchiya	def.	Shinya Yamauchi	Decision (Unanimous)	1	5:00
	Hiroaki Sakuma	def.	Masato Uchiyama	Decision (Unanimous)	1	5:00
	Yasuaki Kishimoto	def.	Shinichiro Arai	TKO (Punches)	1	4:44
	Akihiro Ono	def.	Tatsuya Obitsu	Decision (Unanimous)	1	5:00
	Akimitsu Tsuchiya	def.	Takashi Sato	Decision (Unanimous)	1	5:00
	Masato Uchiyama	def.	Yoshinori Takahashi	Decision (Unanimous)	1	5:00
	Ohiro Omiyama	def.	Kenji Uchimura	Decision (Unanimous)	1	5:00
	Tatsunao Nagakura	def.	Kazuya Sasaki	KO (Punches)	1	1:27
	Kenichi Ogura	def.	Ryo Iseki	Decision (Split)	1	5:00
	Shota Utsunomiya	def.	Kazuyoshi Kiyama	Decision (Unanimous)	1	5:00
	Yu Hosokawa	def.	Kensaku Nakamura	Decision (Split)	1	5:00
	Taketo Inamoto	def.	Ryo Asami	Decision (Unanimous)	1	5:00
	Shota Utsunomiya	def.	Masanori Hirata	Decision (Unanimous)	1	5:00
	Ryosuke Komori	def.	Kazuki Itaya	Submission (Armbar)	1	0:31
	Hiroyuki Kobayashi	def.	Takeshi Numajiri	Submission (Rear-Naked Choke)	1	1:50
	Shohei Kondo	def.	Yoji Nakamura	Decision (Unanimous)	1	5:00
	Yuki Ueshima	def.	Naoki Umehara	Decision (Unanimous)	1	5:00

== See also ==
- List of Deep champions
- List of Deep events
