= Abel Cullum =

American mixed martial arts fighter

- Born: April 21, 1987 (age 39); Tucumcari, New Mexico, US
- Other names: The Silent Assassin
- Height: 5 ft 7 in (1.70 m)
- Weight: 135 lb (61 kg; 9.6 st)
- Division: Bantamweight, Flyweight
- Reach: 69 in (175 cm)
- Fighting out of: Tucumcari, New Mexico, US
- Team: Cullum Ground Fighting
- Years active: 2005–present

Mixed martial arts record
- Total: 28
- Wins: 21
- By knockout: 5
- By submission: 14
- By decision: 2
- Losses: 7
- By submission: 2
- By decision: 5

Other information
- Mixed martial arts record from Sherdog
- Last updated on: October 02, 2009

Abel Cullum (born April 21, 1987) is an American professional mixed martial artist and former King of the Cage Flyweight Champion.

== Mixed martial arts career ==
=== King of the Cage ===
Cullum made his debut for the King of the Cage promotion in November 2006. In May 2008, he won the promotion's Flyweight (135 lbs) title and successfully defend the title four times over the next two years. On September 17, 2010, he lost the title to Jimmie Rivera via split decision. Within the promotion he has posted a record of 8–1.

=== EliteXC 140lb Championship ===
Cullum agreed to step in for an injured Bao Quach and face Brazilian Wilson Reis for EliteXC's 140 lb Championship. It was a highly acclaimed fight, with a lot of very advanced submission attempts and defenses from both fighters. However Abel was unable to overcome the larger Reis, losing the five-round match by unanimous decision.

=== DREAM ===
Cullum competed in the DREAM Featherweight Grand Prix. he defeated kickboxer Akiyo Nishiura via unanimous decision in the first round of the tournament. In the second round of the tournament he faced Hideo Tokoro who he lost to via rear naked choke.

Cullum faced Masakazu Imanari in the opening round of the DREAM Bantamweight Grand Prix at Dream 17 at the Saitama Super Arena in Saitama, Japan, on September 24. He lost the bout via submission in the third round.

=== Resurrection Fighting Alliance ===
After nearly three years away from the sport, Cullum signed with the Resurrection Fighting Alliance promotion. Cullum faced UFC veteran Ulysses Gomez at RFA 18: Manzanares vs. Pantoja on September 12, 2014. He won the fight via first round guillotine choke.

Cullum made a quick return to the cage as he replaced an injured Jeff Curran to face Carl Deaton at RFA 19: Collier vs. Checco on October 10, 2014. He won the fight via submission in the second round.

== Mixed martial arts record ==
Professional record breakdown
28 matches	21 wins	7 losses
By knockout	5	0
By submission	14	2
By decision	2	5

Res.	Record	Opponent	Method	Event	Date	Round	Time	Location	Notes
Loss	21–7	Steve Garcia	Decision (unanimous)	JacksonWink Fight Night 4	November 30, 2018	3	5:00	Albuquerque, New Mexico, United States	
Win	21–6	Joshua Montoya	Submission (guillotine choke)	JacksonWink Fight Night 3	June 2, 2018	1	2:07	Albuquerque, New Mexico, United States	
Win	20–6	Carl Deaton	Submission (rear-naked choke)	RFA 19: Collier vs. Checco	October 10, 2014	2	3:43	Prior Lake, Minnesota, United States	
Win	19–6	Ulysses Gomez	Submission (guillotine choke)	RFA 18: Manzanares vs. Pantoja	September 12, 2014	1	1:29	Albuquerque, New Mexico, United States	
Loss	18–6	Masakazu Imanari	Submission (armbar)	Dream 17	September 24, 2011	3	0:46	Saitama, Japan	Dream Bantamweight Grand Prix Quarterfinal.
Loss	18–5	Jared Papazian	Decision (unanimous)	KOTC: Epic Force	June 24, 2011	5	5:00	Thackerville, Oklahoma, United States	For the vacant KOTC Flyweight Championship.
Loss	18–4	Jimmie Rivera	Decision (split)	KOTC: No Mercy	September 17, 2010	5	5:00	Mashantucket, Connecticut, United States	Lost the KOTC Flyweight Championship.
Win	18–3	Joshua Montoya	Submission (rear-naked choke)	KOTC: Honor	May 14, 2010	1	1:38	Mescalero, New Mexico, United States	Defended the KOTC Flyweight Championship.
Win	17–3	Joe Coca	Submission (kimura)	KOTC: Vengeance	February 12, 2010	1	2:09	Mescalero, New Mexico, United States	Defended the KOTC Flyweight Championship.
Win	16–3	Richard Montano	Decision (unanimous)	KOTC: Gate Keeper	August 1, 2009	5	5:00	Mescalero, New Mexico, United States	Defended the KOTC Flyweight Championship.
Loss	15–3	Hideo Tokoro	Submission (rear-naked choke)	Dream 9	May 26, 2009	2	1:38	Yokohama, Japan	DREAM Featherweight Grand Prix Quarterfinal Round.
Win	15–2	Akiyo Nishiura	Decision (unanimous)	Dream 7	March 8, 2009	2	5:00	Saitama, Japan	DREAM Featherweight Grand Prix Opening Round.
Win	14–2	Brett Roller	Submission (rear-naked choke)	KOTC: Goodfellas	December 6, 2008	1	1:47	Albuquerque, New Mexico, United States	Defended the KOTC Flyweight Championship.
Loss	13–2	Wilson Reis	Decision (unanimous)	ShoXC: Elite Challenger Series	September 26, 2008	5	5:00	Santa Ynez, California, United States	For the EliteXC Bantamweight Championship.
Win	13–1	Ryan Diaz	Submission (armbar)	KOTC: Reckless	May 17, 2008	5	1:27	Greenville, Mississippi, United States	Won the KOTC Flyweight Championship.
Win	12–1	Zach Jenkins	Submission (rear naked choke)	KOTC: Warlords	February 9, 2008	1	N/A	Towaoc, Colorado, United States	
Win	11–1	Eddie Armendariz	KO (punch)	KOTC: Hierarchy	October 13, 2007	1	1:17	Albuquerque, New Mexico, United States	
Win	10–1	Jasper Church	TKO	DE: Clash of the Titans	June 29, 2007	1	1:23	New Mexico, United States	
Win	9–1	Gerald Sedillo	Submission (rear-naked choke)	Southwest Fury	March 10, 2007	1	2:42	Sunland Park, New Mexico, United States	
Win	8–1	John Chester	Submission (rear-naked choke)	KOTC: Cyclone	November 11, 2006	2	1:27	Tulsa, Oklahoma, United States	
Win	7–1	Alfredo Herrea	Submission (armbar)	Universal Fight Promotions	October 14, 2006	2	2:04	Alamogordo, New Mexico, United States	
Win	6–1	Jeremy Ramage	TKO (soccer kicks and punches)	DE: Tucumcari Pride	October 7, 2006	1	1:14	New Mexico, United States	
Win	5–1	Gabe Brockmier	TKO	DE: Total Chaos	August 26, 2006	1	0:36	New Mexico, United States	
Win	4–1	Joel Garvin	Submission (triangle choke)	DE: Thursday Throwdown	June 26, 2006	1	N/A	New Mexico, United States	
Win	3–1	Thomas Urquides	Submission (triangle choke)	DE: Socorro	April 8, 2006	1	3:41	New Mexico, United States	
Win	2–1	Sammy Saenz	KO (punch)	DE: Tribal Nation	February 4, 2006	1	N/A	New Mexico, United States	
Loss	1–1	Richard Montano	Decision (unanimous)	DE: Socorro Showdown	December 10, 2005	2	5:00	New Mexico, United States	
Win	1–0	Michael Chupa	Submission (rear-naked choke)	DE: Beyond Brutal	September 17, 2005	1	1:26	New Mexico, United States	
