= List of Deep champions =

This is a list of Deep champions at each weight class. Deep is a Japan-based mixed martial arts (MMA) promoting and sanctioning organization.

== Current champions ==
=== Men ===
| Division | Champion | Since | Defenses |
|---|---|---|---|
| Megatonweight | (Japan) Taisei Sekino | August 17, 2025 | 1 |
| Heavyweight | Vacant | March 9, 2019 | — |
| Middleweight | (Brazil) João Batista Yoshimura | July 4, 2021 | 0 |
| Welterweight | (Japan) Ibuki Shimada | September 21, 2025 | 1 |
| Lightweight | (Japan) Juri Ohara | October 23, 2026 | 0 |
| Featherweight | (Japan) Shunki Mitsui | November 22, 2026 | 0 |
| Featherweight | (Japan) Arata Mizuno (interim) | May 4, 2026 | 0 |
| Bantamweight | (Japan) Ryuya Fukuda | September 16, 2024 | 1 |
| Bantamweight | (Japan) Jinnosuke Kashimura (interim) | May 4, 2026 | 0 |
| Flyweight | (Japan) Yutaro Muramoto | August 17, 2025 | 1 |
| Strawweight | (Japan) Sukai China | May 4, 2026 | 0 |

=== Women ===
| Division | Champion | Since | Defenses |
|---|---|---|---|
| Openweight | (United States) Amanda Lucas | February 18, 2012 | 0 |
| Atomweight | Vacant | March 9, 2019 | — |
| Microweight | (Japan) Saori Oshima | September 20, 2020 | 1 |

== Men's championship history ==
=== Megatonweight Championship ===
Weight limit: Unlimited

| No. | Name | Event | Date | Reign (total) | Defenses |
|---|---|---|---|---|---|
| 1 | (Japan) Yusuke Kawaguchi def. Shunsuke Inoue | Deep: Megaton Grand Prix 2008 Finals; Tokyo, Japan | August 2, 2008 | 870 days | 1. def Baru Harn at Deep 38 Impact on October 23, 2008; 2. def. Seigo Mizuguchi at Deep: 44 Impact on October 10, 2009; 3. def. Roque Martinez at Deep: Cage Impact 2009 on December 19, 2009 |
Kawaguchi vacated the title on December 20, 2010.
| 2 | (Japan) Kazuhisa Tazawa def. Yuji Sakuragi | Deep 52 Impact; Tokyo, Japan | February 25, 2011 | 182 days | |
| 3 | (Georgia (country)) Levan Razmadze | Deep 55 Impact; Tokyo, Japan | August 26, 2011 | 327 days | 1. def. Ryuta Noji at Deep 57 Impact on February 18, 2012 |
Razmadze vacated the title in July 4, 2012.
| 4 | (Japan) Ken Hasegawa def. Seigo Mizuguchi | Deep 61 Impact; Tokyo, Japan | February 16, 2013 | 970 days | 1. def. Hirohide Fujinuma at Deep 63 Impact on August 25, 2013; 2. def. Kazuhiro Nakamura at Deep 65 Impact on March 22, 2014 |
Hasegawa vacated the title on October 14, 2015 when he started competing at a lower weight class.
| 5 | (India) Jaideep Singh def. Carlos Toyota | Deep 73 Impact; Tokyo, Japan | October 17, 2015 | 637 days | |
| 6 | (Guam) Roque Martinez | Deep Cage Impact 2017: At Korakuen Hall; Tokyo, Japan | July 15, 2017 | 2,887 days | 1. def. Ryo Sakai at Deep 88 Impact on March 9, 2019; 2. def. Seigo Mizuguchi at Deep 93 Impact on December 15, 2019; 3. def. interim champion Ryo Sakai at Deep 118 Impact on March 9, 2024 |
| — | (Japan) Ryo Sakai def. Yukinori Akazawa for interim title | Deep 110 Impact; Tokyo, Japan | November 12, 2022 | – | 1. def Tatsuya Mizuno at Deep 114 Impact on July 2, 2023 |
Martinez retired on May 7, 2025. Title was subsequently vacated on June 10, 2025.
| 7 | (Japan) Taisei Sekino def. Ryo Sakai | Deep 126 Impact; Tokyo, Japan | August 17, 2025 | 462 days (incumbent) | 1. def Shoma Shibisai at Deep 133 Impact on September 13, 2026 |

=== Heavyweight Championship ===
Weight limit: 93 kg (205 lb)

| No. | Name | Event | Date | Reign (total) | Defenses |
|---|---|---|---|---|---|
| 1 | (Japan) Yoshiyuki Nakanishi def. Ryuta Noji | Deep 47 Impact; Tokyo, Japan | April 17, 2010 | 3,248 days | 1. def. Bernard Ackah at Deep 54 Impact on June 24, 2011; 2. def. Yuki Niimura at Deep 60 Impact on October 19, 2012; 3. def. Shunsuke Inoue at Deep 66 Impact on April 29, 2014 |
Nakanishi vacated the title on March 9, 2019 when he retired.

=== Middleweight Championship ===
Weight limit: 84 kg (185.2 lb)

| No. | Name | Event | Date | Reign (total) | Defenses |
|---|---|---|---|---|---|
| 1 | (Japan) Ryuki Ueyama def. Eiji Ishikawa | Deep 5 Impact; Tokyo, Japan | June 9, 2002 | 914 days | 1. drew with Masanori Suda at Deep 12 Impact on September 15, 2003 |
| 2 | (Japan) Ryuta Sakurai | Deep 17 Impact; Tokyo, Japan | December 8, 2004 | 425 days | |
| 3 | (Japan) Ryo Chonan | Deep 23 Impact; Tokyo, Japan | February 5, 2006 | 676 days | 1. def. Ryuta Sakurai at Deep 28 Impact on February 16, 2007 |
Chonan vacated the title on December 12, 2007.
| 4 | (Japan) Yuichi Nakanishi def. Riki Fukuda | Deep 35 Impact; Tokyo, Japan | May 19, 2008 | 408 days | |
| 5 | (Japan) Riki Fukuda | Deep: 42 Impact; Tokyo, Japan | June 30, 2009 | 738 days | 1. def. Ryuta Sakurai at Deep 49 Impact on August 27, 2010 |
Fukuda vacated the title in July 8, 2011 due to being signed with the UFC.
| 6 | (Japan) Kazuhiro Nakamura def. Choi Young | Deep 61 Impact; Tokyo, Japan | February 16, 2013 | 673 days | |
| 7 | (Japan) Yoshiyuki Nakanishi | Deep 70 Impact; Tokyo, Japan | Decision 20, 2014 | 296 days | |
| 8 | (South Korea) Choi Young | Deep Cage Impact 2015 in Osaka; Osaka, Japan | October 11, 2015 | ? days | |
Choi vacated the title in 2016 when he signed with Road FC.
| 9 | (Japan) Tatsuya Mizuno def. Taisuke Okuno | Deep 82 Impact; Tokyo, Japan | February 24, 2018 | 1,227 days | |
| 10 | (Brazil) João-Batista Yoshimura | Deep 102 Impact; Tokyo, Japan | July 4, 2021 | 1,967 days (incumbent) | |

=== Welterweight Championship ===
Weight limit: 77 kg (169.7 lb)

| No. | Name | Event | Date | Reign (total) | Defenses |
|---|---|---|---|---|---|
| 1 | (Japan) Jutaro Nakao def. Daisuke Nakamura | Deep 16 Impact; Tokyo, Japan | October 30, 2004 | 840 days | 1. def. Seichi Ikemoto at RealRhythm 3rd Stage on March 4, 2006 |
| 2 | (Japan) Hidehiko Hasegawa | Deep 28 Impact; Tokyo, Japan | February 16, 2007 | 528 days | 1. drew with Dong Hyun Kim at Deep 32 Impact on October 10, 2007 |
| 3 | (Japan) Seichi Ikemoto | Deep 36 Impact; Osaka, Japan | July 27, 2008 | 547 days | 1. def. Hidetaka Monma at Deep: 40 Impact on February 20, 2009 |
| 4 | (Japan) Yuya Shirai | Deep 45 Impact; Osaka, Japan | January 24, 2010 | 1,189 days | 1. def. Shigetoshi Iwase at Deep 50 Impact on October 24, 2010; 2. def. Taisuke Okuno at Deep 56 Impact on December 16, 2011 |
| 5 | (United States) Dan Hornbuckle | Deep 62 Impact; Tokyo, Japan | April 26, 2013 | 178 days | |
| 6 | (Japan) Ryo Chonan | Deep - Tribe Tokyo Night; Tokyo, Japan | October 20, 2013 | >1 day | |
Chonan won the title in his retirement fight and retired as champion.
| 7 | (Japan) Yuta Watanabe def. Taisuke Okuno | Deep 66 Impact; Tokyo, Japan | April 29, 2014 | 438 days | 1. def. Yuya Shirai at Deep 70 Impact on December 20, 2014 |
| 8 | (Japan) Keita Nakamura | Deep - Cage Impact 2015; Tokyo, Japan | July 20, 2015 | ? days | |
Title vacant when Nakamura signed with the UFC.
| 9 | (Japan) Ryuichiro Sumimura def. Ken Hasegawa | Deep - Cage Impact 2017: at Korakuen Hall; Tokyo, Japan | July 15, 2017 | 1775 days | 1. def. Yoichiro Sato at Deep 83 Impact on April 28, 2018; 2. def. Yuta Watanabe at Deep 94 Impact on March 1, 2020 |
| — | (Japan) Daichi Abe def. Gota Yamashita for interim title | Deep - 100 Impact - 20th Anniversary; Bunkyo, Tokyo, Japan | February 21, 2021 | — | |
Sumimura vacated the title in May 25, 2022 following an injury.
| 10 | (Japan) Daichi Abe promoted to undisputed champion | — | May 25, 2022 | 262 days | |
| 11 | (Japan) Shingo Suzuki | Deep 112 Impact; Tokyo, Japan | February 11, 2023 | 519 days | |
| 12 | (Japan) Yoichiro Sato | Deep 120 Impact; Tokyo, Japan | July 14, 2024 | 295 days | |
| 13 | (Japan) Kohei Kadono | Deep 125 Impact; Tokyo, Japan | May 5, 2025 | 139 days | |
| 14 | (Japan) Ibuki Shimada | Deep Osaka Impact 2025 4th Round; Osaka, Japan | September 21, 2025 | 427 days (incumbent) | 1. def. Kiichi Kunimoto at Deep 130 Impact on March 20, 2026 |

=== Lightweight Championship ===
Weight limit: 70 kg (154.3 lb)

| No. | Name | Event | Date | Reign (total) | Defenses |
|---|---|---|---|---|---|
| 1 | (Japan) Dokonjonosuke Mishima def. Tomomi "Taisho" Iwama | Deep 18 Impact; Tokyo, Japan | February 12, 2005 | ? days | |
Mishima vacated the title in February 2006, as he was unable to defend in the mandatory time period.
| 2 | (Japan) Nobuhiro Obiya def. Ryan Bow | Deep 24 Impact; Tokyo, Japan | April 11, 2006 | 312 days | |
| 3 | (Japan) Kazunori Yokota | Deep 28 Impact; Tokyo, Japan | February 16, 2007 | 459 days | |
| 4 | (South Korea) Bang Seung-hwan | Deep 35 Impact; Tokyo, Japan | May 19, 2008 | ? days | |
Bang vacated the title in October 2008.
| 5 | (Japan) Katsunori Kikuno def. Koichiro Matsumoto | Deep: 41 Impact; Tokyo, Japan | April 16, 2009 | 863 days | 1. def. Nobuhiro Obiya at Deep 50 Impact on October 24, 2010 |
| 6 | (Japan) Mizuto Hirota | Deep 55 Impact; Tokyo, Japan | August 26, 2011 | ? days | 1. def. Seichi Ikemoto at Deep 57 Impact on February 18, 2012 |
Hirota vacated the title in April 2012.
| 7 | (Japan) Daisuke Nakamura def. Yasuaki Kishimoto | Deep 58 Impact; Tokyo, Japan | June 15, 2012 | 326 days | 1. def. Takafumi Ito at Deep 60 Impact on October 19, 2012 |
| 8 | (Japan) Satoru Kitaoka | Deep 62 Impact; Tokyo, Japan | April 26, 2013 | 2,011 days | 1. def. Naoto Miyazaki at Deep 66 Impact on April 29, 2014; 2. def. Yoshiyuki Yoshida at Deep Dream Impact: Omisoka Special on December 31, 2014; 3. def. Yuki Okano at Deep Cage Impact 2015 on Jul 20, 2015; 4. def. Kota Shimoishi at Deep 76 Impact on June 26, 2016 |
| 9 | (Japan) Koji Takeda | Deep 86 Impact; Tokyo, Japan | October 27, 2018 | 1,235 days | 1. def. Juri Ohara at Deep 82 Impact on October 22, 2019; 2. def. Juri Ohara at Deep 93 Impact on December 15, 2019 |
| — | (Japan) Juri Ohara def. Ryota Oki for interim title | Deep 102 Impact; Tokyo, Japan | July 4, 2021 | — | |
Takeda vacated the belt on March 15, 2022.
| 10 | (Japan) Juri Ohara promoted to undisputed champion | — | March 15, 2022 | 552 days | 1. def. Yuma Ishizuka at Deep 108 Impact on Jul 10, 2022; 2. def. Hiroto Uesako at Deep 113 Impact on May 7, 2023 |
| 11 | (South Korea) Lee Song-ha | Deep 115 Impact: Deep Vs. Black Combat 2 Tokyo, Japan | September 18, 2023 | 173 days | |
| 12 | (Japan) Kimihiro Eto | Deep 118 Impact; Tokyo, Japan | March 9, 2024 | 191 days | |
| 13 | (Japan) Shunta Nomura | Deep 121 Impact; Tokyo, Japan | September 16, 2024 | 767 days | |
| — | (Japan) Juri Ohara (2) def. Kouya Kanda for interim title | Deep 128 Impact; Tokyo, Japan | November 2, 2025 | — | NC. vs. Daigo Kuramoto at Deep 130 Impact on Mar 20, 2026; 1. def. Daigo Kuramoto at Deep 131 Impact: 25th Anniversary on May 4, 2026 |
Nomura vacated the belt on October 23, 2026.
| 14 | (Japan) Juri Ohara (2) promoted to undisputed champion | — | October 23, 2026 | 30 days (incumbent) | |

=== Featherweight Championship ===
Weight limit: 65 kg (143.3 lb)

| No. | Name | Event | Date | Reign (total) | Defenses |
|---|---|---|---|---|---|
| 1 | (Japan) Masakazu Imanari def. Yoshiro Maeda | Deep 22 Impact; Tokyo, Japan | December 2, 2005 | 900 days | 1. def. Tsuyoshi Yamazaki at Deep 26 Impact on Oct 10, 2006 |
| 2 | (Japan) Dokonjonosuke Mishima | Deep 35 Impact; Tokyo, Japan | May 19, 2008 | 462 days | |
| 3 | (Japan) Takafumi Otsuka | Deep: 43 Impact; Tokyo, Japan | August 23, 2009 | 315 days | |
| 4 | (Japan) Koichiro Matsumoto | Deep 48 Impact; Tokyo, Japan | July 3, 2010 | 420 days | 1. def. Tatsunao Nagakura at Deep 55 Impact on Aug 26, 2011 |
Matsumoto retired on August 26, 2011, thereby vacating the title.
| 5 | (Japan) Kazunori Yokota def. Hideki Kadowaki | Deep 57 Impact; Tokyo, Japan | February 18, 2012 | ? days | 1. def. Katsunori Tsuda at Deep 66 Impact on Apr 29, 2014 |
Yokota vacated the title in May 2016 when he left to compete for ONE Championship.
| 6 | (Japan) Masakazu Imanari (2) def. Tatsunao Nagakura | Deep Cage Impact 2016: Deep vs. WSOF-GC; Tokyo, Japan | December 17, 2016 | ? days | |
Imanari vacated the title for unknown reasons.
| 7 | (Japan) Hiroto Uesako def. Koichi Ishizuka | Deep Cage Impact 2017: At Korakuen Hall; Tokyo, Japan | July 15, 2017 | 162 days | |
| 8 | (Japan) Takahiro Ashida | Deep 81 Impact; Tokyo, Japan | December 23, 2017 | 309 days | |
| 9 | (Japan) Satoshi Yamasu | Deep 86 Impact; Tokyo, Japan | October 27, 2018 | 695 days | 1. def. Daiki Hata at Deep 89 Impact on May 12, 2019 |
| 10 | (Japan) Juntaro Ushiku | Deep 97 Impact; Tokyo, Japan | September 20, 2020 | 1189 days | 1. def. Daisuke Nakamura at Deep 102 Impact on July 4, 2021; 2. def. Kouya Kanda at Deep 105 Impact on December 12, 2021 |
| — | (Japan) Kouya Kanda def. Hiroto Gomyo for interim title | Deep 112 Impact; Tokyo, Japan | February 11, 2023 | — | |
Ushiku vacated the title on December 21, 2023, when he started competing at a lower weight class.
| 11 | (Japan) Kouya Kanda promoted to undisputed champion | — | December 21, 2023 | 79 days | |
| 12 | (Japan) Jin Aoi | Deep 118 Impact; Tokyo, Japan | March 9, 2024 | 988 days | 1. def. Arata Mizuno at Deep 129 Impact on Dec 14, 2025 |
| — | (Japan) Arata Mizuno def. Juntaro Ushiku for interim title | Deep 131 Impact: 25th Anniversary; Yokohama, Japan | May 4, 2026 | 202 days (incumbent) | |
| 13 | (Japan) Shunki Mitsui | Deep 134 Impact; Tokyo, Japan | November 22, 2026 | 0 days (incumbent) | |

=== Bantamweight Championship ===
Weight limit: 60 kg (132.3 lb)

| No. | Name | Event | Date | Reign (total) | Defenses |
|---|---|---|---|---|---|
| 1 | (Japan) Masakazu Imanari def. Hiroshi Umemura | Deep 37 Impact; Tokyo, Japan | August 17, 2008 | 1,018 days | 1. def. Tomohiko Hori at Deep: 43 Impact on August 23, 2009; 2. def. Tomoya Miyashita at Deep 49 Impact on August 27, 2010 |
Imanari vacated the title on May 31, 2011.
| 2 | (Japan) Takafumi Otsuka def. Hiroshi Nakamura | Deep 54 Impact; Tokyo, Japan | June 24, 2011 | 240 days | |
| 3 | (Japan) Yoshiro Maeda | Deep 57 Impact; Tokyo, Japan | February 18, 2012 | 434 days | 1. def. Tatsumitsu Wada at Deep 59 Impact on August 18, 2012 |
| 4 | (Japan) Daiki Hata | Deep 62 Impact; Tokyo, Japan | April 26, 2013 | ? days | |
Hata vacated the title.
| 5 | (Japan) Takafumi Otsuka (2) def. Kenji Osawa | Deep 66 Impact; Tokyo, Japan | April 29, 2014 | ? days | 1. def. Toshinori Tsunemura at Deep 69 Impact on October 26, 2014; 2. def. Toshiaki Kitada at Deep 72 Impact on May 16, 2015; 3. def. Koichi Ishizuka at Deep Cage Impact 2017 on May 13, 2017 |
Otsuka vacated the title for unknown reasons.
| 6 | (South Korea) Son Jin-soo def. Toshiaki Kitada | Deep 83 Impact; Tokyo, Japan | April 28, 2018 | ? days | |
Son vacated the title in 2018 when he signed with UFC.
| 7 | (Japan) Yuki Motoya def. Makoto Kamaya | Deep 86 Impact; Tokyo, Japan | October 27, 2018 | 134 days | |
| 8 | (United States) Victor Henry | Deep 88 Impact; Tokyo, Japan | March 9, 2019 | 1,619 days | |
| — | (Japan) Kosuke Terashima def. Daiki Hata for interim title | Deep 107 Impact; Tokyo, Japan | May 8, 2022 | — | |
| — | (Japan) Koichi Ishizuka def. Kosuke Terashima for interim title | Deep 110 Impact; Tokyo, Japan | November 12, 2022 | — | |
Henry vacated the title on August 15, 2023 due to being unable to defend his title while signed with UFC.
| 9 | (Japan) Koichi Ishizuka promoted to undisputed champion | — | August 15, 2023 | 34 days | |
| 10 | (South Korea) Yoo Soo-young | Deep 115 Impact: Deep Vs. Black Combat 2 Tokyo, Japan | September 18, 2023 | 194 days | |
Yoo vacated the title on March 30, 2024.
| 11 | (Japan) Ryuya Fukuda def. Kenta Takizawa | Deep 121 Impact; Tokyo, Japan | September 16, 2024 | 797 days (incumbent) | 1. def. Juntaro Ushiku at Deep 125 Impact on May 5, 2025 |
| — | (Japan) Jinnosuke Kashimura def. Sho Hiramatsu for interim title | Deep 131 Impact: 25th Anniversary; Yokohama, Japan | May 4, 2026 | 202 days (incumbent) | |

=== Flyweight Championship ===
Weight limit: 56 kg (123.4 lb)

| No. | Name | Event | Date | Reign (total) | Defenses |
|---|---|---|---|---|---|
| 1 | (Japan) Yuki Motoya def. Akira Kibe | Deep Nagoya Impact; Nagoya, Aichi, Japan | July 22, 2012 | 400 days | |
| 2 | (Japan) Tatsumitsu Wada | Deep 63 Impact; Tokyo, Japan | August 25, 2013 | 364 days | |
| 3 | (Japan) Yuki Motoya (2) | Deep 68 Impact; Tokyo, Japan | August 23, 2014 | ? days | 1. def. Kojima Sota at Deep 73 Impact on October 17, 2015 |
Motoya vacated the title in April 2016.
| 4 | (Japan) Tatsumitsu Wada (2) def. Yuya Shibata | Deep 76 Impact; Tokyo, Japan | June 26, 2016 | 1,342 days | 1. def. Makoto Takahashi at Deep 83 Impact on April 28, 2018 |
| — | (Japan) Makoto Takahashi def. Yuya Shibata for interim title | Deep 90 Impact; Tokyo, Japan | June 29, 2019 | — | |
Wada vacated the title on February 28, 2020.
| 5 | (Japan) Makoto Takahashi promoted to undisputed champion. | — | February 28, 2020 | 1,490 days | 1. def. Yamato Fujita in unification bout at Deep 107 Impact on May 8, 2022 |
| — | (Japan) Yamato Fujita def. Kazuki Shibuya for interim title | Deep 100 Impact - 20th Anniversary; Tokyo, Japan | February 21, 2021 | — | 1. def. Yuki Ito at Deep 103 Impact on September 23, 2021 |
| — | (Japan) Ryuya Fukuda def. Ryosuke Honda for interim title | Deep 113 Impact; Tokyo, Japan | May 7, 2023 | — | |
Takahashi vacated the title on March 29, 2024 to focus on competing in RIZIN.
| 6 | (Japan) Ryuya Fukuda promoted to undisputed champion. | — | March 29, 2024 | 438 days | |
Fukuda vacated the title on June 10, 2025.
| 7 | (Japan) Yutaro Muramoto def. Kenta Hayashi | Deep 126 Impact; Tokyo, Japan | August 17, 2025 | 462 days (incumbent) | 1. def. Rikiya Matsuzawa at Deep 130 Impact: 25th Anniversary on May 4, 2026 |

=== Strawweight Championship ===
Weight limit: 52 kg (114.6 lb)

| No. | Name | Event | Date | Reign (total) | Defenses |
|---|---|---|---|---|---|
| 1 | (Japan) Kanta Sato def. Kojima Sota | Deep Cage Impact 2016: Korakuen Hall; Tokyo, Japan | October 18, 2016 | 334 days | |
| 2 | (Japan) Haruo Ochi | Deep 79 Impact; Tokyo, Japan | September 16, 2017 | 1,073 days | 1. def. Yuya Shibata at Deep Cage Impact in Osaka 2018 on April 8, 2018; 2. def. Namiki Kawahara at Deep 88 Impact on March 9, 2019 |
| 3 | (Japan) Namiki Kawahara | Deep 96 Impact; Tokyo, Japan | August 23, 2020 | 1,372 days | |
| — | (Japan) Haruo Ochi def. Yusuke Uehara for interim title | Deep 117 Impact; Tokyo, Japan | December 10, 2023 | — | |
| 4 | (Japan) Haruo Ochi (2) | DEEP Tokyo Impact 2024 3rd Round; Tokyo, Japan | May 26, 2024 | 567 days | |
| 5 | (Japan) Sora Sugiyama | DEEP Tokyo Impact 2025 6th Round; Tokyo, Japan | December 14, 2025 | 141 days | |
| 6 | (Japan) Sukai China | DEEP 131 Impact: 25th Anniversary; Yokohama, Japan | May 4, 2026 | 202 days (incumbent) | |

== Women's championship history ==
=== Women's Openweight Championship ===
| No. | Name | Event | Date | Reign (total) | Defenses |
|---|---|---|---|---|---|
| 1 | (United States) Amanda Lucas def. Yumiko Hotta | Deep 57 Impact; Tokyo, Japan | February 18, 2012 | 3,918 days (Note: While the title hasn't been active since 2012 and Lucas isn't competing anymore, Deep never announced the vacancy of the title.) | |

=== Women's Atomweight Championship ===
Weight limit: 49 kg (105.8 lb)

| No. | Name | Event | Date | Reign (total) | Defenses |
|---|---|---|---|---|---|
| 1 | (Japan) Hisae Watanabe def. Satoko Shinashi | Deep 25 Impact; Tokyo, Japan | August 4, 2006 | 367 days | |
| 2 | (Japan) Miku Matsumoto | Deep 31 Impact; Tokyo, Japan | August 5, 2007 | 987 days | 1. def. Misaki Takimoto at Deep 37 Impact on August 17, 2008; 2. def. Lisa Ward at Deep TOYAMA Impact on June 28, 2009 |
Matsumoto vacated the title on April 17, 2010, following her retirement from the sport.

=== Women's Microweight Championship ===
Weight limit: 45 kg (99.2 lb)

| No. | Name | Event | Date | Reign (total) | Defenses |
|---|---|---|---|---|---|
| 1 | (Japan) Satoko Shinashi def. Sachiko Yamamoto | Deep 34 Impact; Tokyo, Japan | February 22, 2008 | 3,962 days | |
Shinashi vacated the title in 2018.
| 2 | (Japan) Saori Oshima def. Mizuki Oshiro | Deep 97 Impact; Tokyo, Japan | September 20, 2020 | 2,254 days (incumbent) | 1. def. Mizuki Furuse at Deep 110 Impact on November 12, 2022; 2. def. Aya Murakami at Deep Jewels 45 on May 26, 2024 |

== See also ==
- List of current mixed martial arts champions
- List of Deep events
- List of Jewels events
- List of Jewels champions
- List of Pancrase champions
- List of Pride champions
- List of Road FC champions
- List of Strikeforce champions
- List of UFC champions
- List of WEC champions
- Mixed martial arts weight classes
