= Kim Jong-man (disambiguation) =

Kim Jong-man is the name of:

- Kim Jong-man
- Kim Jong-man (footballer, born 1960s)
