= 2007 in Deep =

Mixed martial arts events

Information
- First date: February 16, 2007
- Last date: December 22, 2007

Events
- Total events: 22

Fights
- Total fights: 249
- Title fights: 5

Chronology
2006 in Deep	2007 in Deep	2008 in Deep

The year 2007 was the seventh year in the history of Deep, a mixed martial arts promotion based in Japan. In 2007 Deep held 22 events beginning with, Deep: 28 Impact.

== Title fights ==
Title fights in 2007
Weight class				Method	Round	Time	Event	Notes
Middleweight	Ryo Chonan (c)	def.	Ryuta Sakurai	Decision (Majority)	3	5:00	Deep: 28 Impact	(Note: For the Deep Middleweight Championship.)
Lightweight	Kazunori Yokota	def.	Nobuhiro Obiya (c)	Decision (Unanimous)	3	5:00	Deep: 28 Impact	(Note: For the Deep Lightweight Championship.)
Welterweight	Hidehiko Hasegawa	def.	Jutaro Nakao (c)	Decision (Majority)	3	5:00	Deep: 28 Impact	(Note: For the Deep Welterweight Championship.)
Lightweight	Miku Matsumoto	def.	Hisae Watanabe (c)	Decision (Majority)	3	5:00	Deep: 31 Impact	(Note: For the Deep Women's Lightweight Championship.)
Welterweight	Hidehiko Hasegawa (c)	vs.	Dong Hyun Kim	Draw	3	5:00	Deep: 32 Impact	(Note: For the Deep Welterweight Championship.)

== Events list ==
#	Event title	Date	Arena	Location
71	Deep: Protect Impact 2007	December 22, 2007	Umeda Stella Hall	Osaka
70	Deep: 33 Impact	December 12, 2007	Korakuen Hall	Tokyo
69	Deep: clubDeep Kanazawa	December 9, 2007	Ishikawa Industrial Pavilion Second Hall	Kanazawa
68	Deep: Kobudo Fight 1	November 3, 2007	Kobudo Martial Arts Communication Space Tiger Hall	Nagoya
67	Deep: clubDeep Sendai	October 28, 2007	Zepp Sendai	Sendai
66	Deep: clubDeep Hamamatsu	October 21, 2007	Act City	Hamamatsu
65	Deep: clubDeep Osaka	October 13, 2007	Azalea Taisho Hall	Osaka
64	Deep: 32 Impact	October 9, 2007	Korakuen Hall	Tokyo
63	Deep: clubDeep Yamaguchi	September 23, 2007	Shinnanyo Gymnasium	Shinnan'yō
62	Deep: clubDeep Tokyo	September 15, 2007	Shinjuku Face	Tokyo
61	Deep: 31 Impact	August 5, 2007	Korakuen Hall	Tokyo
60	Deep: Glove	July 26, 2007	Korakuen Hall	Tokyo
59	Deep: CMA Festival 2	July 23, 2007	Korakuen Hall	Tokyo
58	Deep: 30 Impact	July 8, 2007	Zepp Osaka	Osaka
57	Deep: Deep in Yamagata	June 24, 2007	Mikawa Town Gymnasium	Mikawa
56	Deep: Oyaji Deep	June 16, 2007	Shinjuku Face	Tokyo
55	Deep: clubDeep Tokyo	June 16, 2007	Shinjuku Face	Tokyo
54	Deep: clubDeep Nagoya: MB3z Impact, Power of a Dream	June 10, 2007	Zepp Nagoya	Nagoya
53	Deep: 1st Amateur Impact	May 27, 2007	Mach Dojo	Ryūgasaki
52	Deep: clubDeep Toyama: Barbarian Festival 6	May 13, 2007	Toyama Event Plaza	Toyama
51	Deep: 29 Impact	April 13, 2007	Korakuen Hall	Tokyo
50	Deep: 28 Impact	February 16, 2007	Korakuen Hall	Tokyo

== Deep: 28 Impact ==
Deep: 28 Impact was an event held on February 16, 2007 at Korakuen Hall in Tokyo.

=== Results ===
Main Card
Weight class				Method	Round	Time	Notes
Middleweight	Ryo Chonan (c)	def.	Ryuta Sakurai	Decision (Majority)	3	5:00	(Note: For the Deep Middleweight Championship.)
Lightweight	Kazunori Yokota	def.	Nobuhiro Obiya (c)	Decision (Unanimous)	3	5:00	(Note: For the Deep Lightweight Championship.)
Welterweight	Hidehiko Hasegawa	def.	Jutaro Nakao (c)	Decision (Majority)	3	5:00	(Note: For the Deep Welterweight Championship.)
	Seo Hee Ham	def.	Hisae Watanabe	Decision (Unanimous)	2	5:00
	Hector Lombard	def.	Eiji Ishikawa	TKO (Punches)	1	0:50
	Yasuhito Namekawa	vs.	Fabiano Capoani	Draw	2	5:00
	Miki Shida	def.	Takeshi Yamazaki	Decision (Majority)	2	5:00
	Michihiro Omigawa	def.	Won Jin Eoh	TKO (Punch)	1	4:25
	Dong Hyun Kim	def.	Hidenobu Koike	KO (Punch)	2	4:33
	Toshiaki Kitada	def.	Tatsuhito Satsuma	Submission (Guillotine Choke)	1	1:27
	Motomare Takahashi	vs.	Tomoya Miyashita	Draw	2	5:00
	Takumi Shimazaki	vs.	Sofuku Ra	Draw	2	5:00
	Yoshitomo Watanabe	def.	Kenji Ushioda	Submission (Armbar)	1	2:20

== Deep: 29 Impact ==
Deep: 29 Impact was an event held on April 13, 2007 at Korakuen Hall in Tokyo.

=== Results ===
Main Card
Weight class				Method	Round	Time	Notes
	Murilo Bustamante	def.	Ryuta Sakurai	KO (Punch)	1	3:50
	Satoru Kitaoka	def.	Fabricio Monteiro	Submission (Arm-Triangle Choke)	2	2:37
	Ryan Bow	def.	Yoshihiro Tomioka	Submission (Rear-Naked Choke)	3	3:01
	Hisae Watanabe	def.	Masako Yoshida	Submission (Armbar)	2	1:19
	Yasuhito Namekawa	def.	Yuji Sakuragi	Submission (Heel Hook)	1	2:12
	Cristiano Kaminishi	def.	Henry Miller	KO (Head Kick)	1	4:00
	Michihiro Omigawa	def.	Naoki Matsushita	TKO (Punches)	2	1:17
	Shigetoshi Iwase	def.	Sen Nakadai	Submission (Rear-Naked Choke)	1	3:25
	Katsunori Kikuno	def.	Takuhiro Kamikozono	Decision (Majority)	2	5:00
	Joe Doerksen	def.	Dae Won Kim	Submission (Triangle Choke)	1	3:35
	Yusuke Kawaguchi	def.	Hirotaka Fujiyama	Decision (Majority)	2	5:00
	Gyon Il Yon	vs.	Yoshitomo Watanabe	Draw	2	5:00
	Tomoya Miyashita	def.	Tomoji Mikami	Submission (Guillotine Choke)	1	1:00
	Hiroshi Masabuchi	def.	Don Ho Hung	Submission (Armbar)	1	3:51

== Deep: clubDeep Toyama: Barbarian Festival 6 ==
Deep: clubDeep Toyama: Barbarian Festival 6 was an event held on May 13, 2007 at Toyama Event Plaza in Toyama.

=== Results ===
Main Card
Weight class				Method	Round	Time	Notes
	Yoshihiro Tomioka	def.	Kosuke Umeda	Submission (Rear-Naked Choke)	2	1:07
	Miku Matsumoto	def.	Seo Hee Ham	Submission (Triangle Choke)	2	3:44
	Isao Terada	def.	Masayasu Hori	Submission (Armbar)	1	1:23
	Luiz Andrade I	def.	Yuya Osugi	Submission (Armbar)	1	4:56
	Yasushi Kitazaki	def.	Tamotsu Kitada	TKO (Punches)	2	2:22
	Shinobu Aoyama	def.	Takahiro Ito	TKO (Punches)	1	3:56
	Teruhiko Kubo	vs.	Akimitsu Tsuchiya	Draw	2	5:00
	Kunihiro Watanabe	def.	Hideo Matsui	Decision (Majority)	2	5:00
	Tomoyuki Ora	def.	Claudio Silva	KO (Punch)	2	1:13
	Minoru Tavares Tsuchiya	def.	Norio Mamushi	Submission (Kimura)	2	1:49

== Deep: 1st Amateur Impact ==
Deep: 1st Amateur Impact was an event held on May 27, 2007 at Mach Dojo in Ryugasaki.

=== Results ===
Main Card
Weight class				Method	Round	Time	Notes
	Hikaru Nagaseki	def.	Kosei Asukagawa	Submission (Armbar)	1	1:59
	Shinobu Goto	def.	Masahiko Nakajima	Submission (Armbar)	1	3:44
	Yasuo Munakata	def.	Takanori Hirano	Decision (Unanimous)	1	5:00
	Masayuki Akimori	def.	Masanari Hosaka	TKO (Punches)	1	3:56
	Fujio Yanagawa	def.	Masakado Fujita	Submission (Armbar)	1	3:21
	Kazuyoshi Ikeda	def.	Ryuji Shinozuka	Decision (Split)	1	5:00
	Kazuaki Miyashita	def.	Kazutaka Sasanuma	Decision (Unanimous)	1	5:00
	Chikara Shimabukuro	def.	Kenichi Kinoshita	Decision (Unanimous)	1	5:00
	Takashi Kumada	def.	Takao Yoshizawa	Submission (Rear-Naked Choke)	1	1:22
	Johnny Ono	def.	Katsunari Takahashi	KO (Punch)	1	3:23
	Hiroyuki Kobayashi	def.	Atsushi Itokawa	Decision (Unanimous)	1	5:00
	Yoichi Masuki	def.	Yuma Suzuki	Decision (Split)	1	5:00
	Yasushi Shoji	def.	Naotaka Tsukioka	DQ (Low Blow)	1	1:19
	Yuzo Minami	def.	Yuki Hirota	Submission (Triangle Choke)	1	3:08
	Hikaru Nagaseki	def.	Keisuke Sato	Submission (Armbar)	1	2:07
	Kazuya Tamura	def.	Yasuo Munakata	Submission (Achilles Lock)	1	1:45
	Koji Nakamura	def.	Andrei Chinen	Submission (Kimura)	1	2:53
	Hiroki Kuga	def.	Seo Gyun Ma	Submission (Armbar)	1	1:08
	Yuji Ishikawa	def.	Satoshi Inoue	TKO (Doctor Stoppage)	1	3:37
	Masahiko Nakajima	def.	Katsuhiko Nomura	TKO (Doctor Stoppage)	1	4:20
	Mitsuhiko Ikezaki	def.	Yasuji Yasuzawa	Submission (Armbar)	1	3:24

== Deep: clubDeep Nagoya: MB3z Impact, Power of a Dream ==
Deep: clubDeep Nagoya: MB3z Impact, Power of a Dream was an event held on June 10, 2007 at Zepp Nagoya in Nagoya.

=== Results ===
Main Card
Weight class				Method	Round	Time	Notes
	Naoki Matsushita	def.	Edison Salman Mishio	Decision (Unanimous)	2	5:00
	Takahiro Kajita	def.	Marcelo Shigeo Kobayashi	TKO (Punches)	1	2:40
	Naoki Kimura	def.	Mauricio Ishizuka	Submission (Rear Naked Choke)	2	2:18
	Marlon Medeiros	def.	Takayuki Muramatsu	Submission (Rear Naked Choke)	2	4:04
	Toru Eto	def.	Daiki Suzuki	Decision (Majority)	2	5:00
	Yoshinobu Kawamura	def.	Naohiro Kamiya	TKO (Punches)	1	2:17
	Takao Nakajima	def.	Makoto Oishi	Submission (Armbar)	1	2:50

== Deep: clubDeep Tokyo ==
Deep: clubDeep Tokyo was an event held on June 16, 2007 at Shinjuku Face in Tokyo.

=== Results ===
Main Card
Weight class				Method	Round	Time	Notes
	Miku Matsumoto	def.	Misaki Takimoto	Submission (Armbar)	1	4:32
	Toshiaki Kitada	def.	Tomohiko Hori	Decision (Unanimous)	2	5:00
	Yuki Inoue	def.	Takaaki Aoki	Decision (Unanimous)	2	5:00
	Sojiro Orui	def.	Geovani Pereira	Submission (Neck Crank)	1	1:41
	Yuki Ito	def.	Masakazu Kuramochi	TKO (Punches)	1	4:58
	Ippo Watanuki	vs.	Tomoya Miyashita	Draw	2	5:00
	Takafumi Otsuka	def.	Motomare Takahashi	Submission (Rear-Naked Choke)	1	2:42
	Yoshitomo Watanabe	def.	Tetsuya Yoshida	Submission (Triangle Choke)	2	4:42
	Hiroaki Kashiwabara	def.	Shingo Matsuda	Decision (Majority)	2	5:00
	Shigeyuki Uchiyama	def.	Kota Ishibashi	Decision (Unanimous)	2	5:00
	Yutaka Kobayashi	def.	Yoshinari Asano	Submission (Kimura)	2	2:07
	Seiji Ozuka	def.	Takumi Shimazaki	Decision (Split)	2	5:00
	Yusuke Kawanago	def.	Satoru Nito	TKO (Punches)	1	3:58

== Deep: Oyaji Deep ==
Deep: Oyaji Deep was an event held on June 16, 2007 at Shinjuku Face in Tokyo.

=== Results ===
Main Card
Weight class				Method	Round	Time	Notes
	Hidetada Irie	def.	Mitu Mitu	Submission (Armbar)	1	0:57
	Yoshinori Fukumoto	def.	Hironobu Yamashita	KO (Knees)	1	0:14
	Ryuichi Tanaka	def.	Takuya Fujimura	Submission (Rear-Naked Choke)	2	2:18
	Keisuke Oyazi	def.	Toshiyuki Oda	Decision (Majority)	2	3:00
	Keith Vargo	def.	Kosuke Suda	TKO (Punches)	1	0:14
	Hideki Nishiyama	def.	Hajime Hyodo	Submission (Kimura)	1	2:26
	Haruo Hasegawa	def.	Shigetaka Yamada	TKO (Punches)	2	2:36
	Masanori Takano	def.	Kotaro Shinseki	Decision (Unanimous)	2	3:00
	Atsushi Wakui	def.	Masahiro Sato	Submission (Kimura)	1	1:02
	Riki Kanesada	def.	Atsushi Imamura	Submission (Kimura)	1	2:25
	Masatake Takeuchi	def.	Kohei Murofushi	Decision (Majority)	2	3:00
	Kanae Saito	def.	Seiko Arai	Submission (Kimura)	2	1:13
	Wataru Okamoto	def.	Yasuyuki Yamamoto	TKO (Punches)	2	0:42

== Deep: Deep in Yamagata ==
Deep: Deep in Yamagata was an event held on June 24, 2007 at Mikawa Town Gymnasium in Mikawa.

=== Results ===
Main Card
Weight class				Method	Round	Time	Notes
	Ryo Chonan	def.	Doo Won Seo	TKO (Punches)	1	2:58
	Yuya Shirai	def.	Eiji Ishikawa	Decision (Majority)	3	5:00
	Hiroki Nagaoka	vs.	Scott Anderson	Draw	2	5:00
	Luiz Andrade I	def.	Kosuke Umeda	KO (Head Kick)	1	2:31
	Yuta Watanabe	def.	Carlos Toyota	TKO (Flying Knee)	1	3:49
	Isamu Sugiuchi	def.	Wataru Suyama	Submission (Armbar)	1	1:36
	Yuki Saito	vs.	Yoon Heo	Draw	2	5:00
	Muneyuki Sato	def.	Yuichi Ogawa	Submission (Rear-Naked Choke)	1	2:41
	Yoshiyuki Wada	def.	Yusuke Yoshida	Submission (Achilles Lock)	1	3:04
	Masaya Doi	def.	Hanto Hanto	TKO (Punches)	1	0:11

== Deep: 30 Impact ==
Deep: 30 Impact was an event held on July 8, 2007 at Zepp Osaka in Osaka.

=== Results ===
Main Card
Weight class				Method	Round	Time	Notes
	Jutaro Nakao	vs.	Kiuma Kunioku	Draw	3	5:00
	Seichi Ikemoto	def.	Tae Hyun Bang	Decision (Unanimous)	3	5:00
	Tomoyuki Fukami	def.	Henri Kakiuchi	Submission (Arm-Triangle Choke)	2	2:21
	Yukinari Tamura	def.	William Animal	TKO (Submission to punches)	1	4:36
	Ken Hamamura	def.	Hidehira Yabu	TKO (Punches)	2	0:57
	Yusuke Sakashita	def.	Seigo Mizuguchi	Decision (Unanimous)	2	5:00
	Yasuaki Miura	def.	Kazuhiko Wakita	Submission (Anaconda Choke)	1	1:37
	Motoyuki Takinishi	def.	Kenta Nakamura	Decision (Unanimous)	2	5:00
	Isao Terada	def.	Kosuke Eda	KO (Punch)	2	0:40
	Yasushi Kitazaki	def.	Hiroki Tanaka	Submission (Armbar)	1	3:19
	Nobuyuki Shimakawa	vs.	Masahiro Toryu	Draw	2	5:00
	Toru Harai	def.	Soyu Tanabe	TKO (Punches)	2	4:50
	Makoto Kamaya	vs.	Nobuhiro Yoshitake	Draw	2	5:00
	Rikiya Kawakami	vs.	Taro Kusano	Draw	2	5:00
	Takuya Sato	vs.	Ryohei Arai	Draw	2	5:00

== Deep: CMA Festival 2 ==
Deep: CMA Festival 2 was an event held on July 23, 2007 at Korakuen Hall in Tokyo.

=== Results ===
Main Card
Weight class				Method	Round	Time	Notes
	Ikuhisa Minowa	def.	Min Suk Heo	TKO (Corner Stoppage)	1	5:00
	Kosei Kubota	def.	Doo Won Seo	Decision (Unanimous)	2	5:00
	Takayo Hashi	def.	Hee Jin Lee	Decision (Unanimous)	2	5:00
	Kazue Matake	def.	Yang Joo Lee	Submission (Armbar)	2	3:44
	Ken Hamamura	def.	Dong Ho Han]	TKO (Punches)	1	3:37
	Dongi Yang	def.	Junpei Hamada	TKO (Punches)	1	3:56
	Tae Hyun Bang	def.	Naoki Matsushita	Decision (Unanimous)	2	5:00
	Hiromu Nagado	def.	Yoon Heo	Decision (Split)	2	5:00
	Gotoku Onda	def.	Ji-Hoon Kim	TKO (Punches)	1	3:36
	Dong Hyun Kim	def.	Yukiharu Maejima	KO (Punch)	1	0:11

== Deep: Glove ==
Deep: Glove was an event held on February 5, 2007 at Korakuen Hall in Tokyo.

=== Results ===
Main Card
Weight class				Method	Round	Time	Notes
	Naoki Samukawa	def.	Gyon Nam Kim	TKO (Cut)	1	1:13
	Yasuhito Namekawa	def.	Hamish Robertson	Submission (Half Crab Lock)	1	1:06
	Hikaru Shinohara	def.	Gebeka Beck Ninez	Submission (Straight Armbar)	2	3:38
	Yuki Sasaki	def.	Bo Guk So	Submission (Armbar)	1	1:46
	Katsuhisa Fujii	def.	Yuji Sakuragi	Decision (Majority)	2	5:00
	Manabu Hara	def.	Yuta Yoshikawa	TKO (Punches)	2	3:02

== Deep: 31 Impact ==
Deep: 31 Impact was an event held on August 5, 2007 at Korakuen Hall in Tokyo.

=== Results ===
Main Card
Weight class				Method	Round	Time	Notes
	Dong Hyun Kim	def.	Hidehiko Hasegawa	KO (Slam and Punches)	3	4:57
Lightweight	Miku Matsumoto	def.	Hisae Watanabe (c)	Decision (Majority)	3	5:00	(Note: For the Deep Women's Lightweight Championship.)
	Masakazu Imanari	def.	Jong Man Kim	Submission (Armbar)	1	3:28
	Kazunori Yokota	def.	Minoru Tavares Tsuchiya	Submission (Armbar)	1	3:53
	Yoshihiro Tomioka	def.	Makoto Ishikawa	KO (Punches)	1	3:12
	Ryuichi Murata	vs.	Sojiro Orui	Draw	2	5:00
	Yuya Shirai	def.	Kozo Urita	Submission (Armbar)	1	2:42
	Dongi Yang	def.	Keigo Takamori	TKO (Punches)	1	1:57
	Takeshi Yamazaki	def.	Toshiaki Kitada	Decision (Majority)	2	5:00
	Yusuke Kawaguchi	def.	Kosaku Shikimasu	KO (Punch)	1	1:06
	Seiji Ozuka	vs.	Takafumi Otsuka	Draw	2	5:00
	Takumi Shimazaki	def.	Takao Nakajima	Submission (Rear-Naked Choke)	1	1:16

== Deep: clubDeep Tokyo ==
Deep: clubDeep Tokyo was an event held on September 15, 2007 at Shinjuku Face in Tokyo.

=== Results ===
Main Card
Weight class				Method	Round	Time	Notes
	Ryuhei Sato	def.	Kosei Kubota	TKO (Punches)	1	1:19
	Kosuke Umeda	def.	Takahiro Kajita	Decision (Majority)	2	5:00
	Tomohiko Hori	def.	Isao Terada	Decision (Unanimous)	2	5:00
	Tomoya Miyashita	def.	Tatsuhito Satsuma	Submission (Guillotine Choke)	2	3:03
	Tsuneyoshi Kashimura	vs.	Noboru Onishi	Draw	2	5:00
	Yoshiyuki Nakanishi	def.	Mamoru Nakamura	KO (Punch)	1	0:32
	Hiroshi Nakano	def.	Toshiaki Saiki	Decision (Unanimous)	2	5:00
	Makoto Kawawa	def.	Atsushi Atsushi	TKO (Doctor Stoppage)	1	3:03
	Seigo Inoue	def.	Norimasa Iwasaki	Submission (Armbar)	2	2:31
	Yoshiki Ishida	def.	Takashi Sato	Decision (Unanimous)	2	5:00

== Deep: clubDeep Yamaguchi ==
Deep: clubDeep Yamaguchi was an event held on September 23, 2007 at Shinnanyo Gymnasium in Shinnan'yo.

=== Results ===
Main Card
Weight class				Method	Round	Time	Notes
	Toru Harai	def.	Seiji Ozuka	Decision (Unanimous)	2	5:00
	Daiki Nagasako	def.	Motomare Takahashi	Decision (Unanimous)	2	5:00
	Yuta Watanabe	def.	Yuya Aikawa	TKO (Punches)	1	2:54
	Tsubasa Akiyama	def.	Yujiro Sakaide	KO (Punch)	1	0:42
	Akira Toritani	def.	Toshihiro Taguchi	KO (Punch)	2	1:00
	Yuichi Kishino	def.	Yuji Yanai	Submission (Rear Naked Choke)	1	4:00

== Deep: 32 Impact ==
Deep: 32 Impact was an event held on October 9, 2007 at Korakuen Hall in Tokyo.

=== Results ===
Main Card
Weight class				Method	Round	Time	Notes
Welterweight	Hidehiko Hasegawa (c)	vs.	Dong Hyun Kim	Draw	3	5:00	(Note: For the Deep Welterweight Championship.)
	Masakazu Imanari	def.	Hiroyuki Abe	Submission (Toe Hold)	3	4:32
	Ryuta Sakurai	def.	Eiji Ishikawa	TKO (Cut)	1	5:00
	Seichi Ikemoto	vs.	Kiuma Kunioku	Draw	2	5:00
	Satoko Shinashi	def.	Sachiko Yamamoto	Submission (Straight Armbar)	1	3:11
	Yasuhito Namekawa	def.	Katsuhisa Fujii	Decision (Majority)	2	5:00
	Tae Hyun Bang	def.	Yoshihiro Tomioka	Decision (Unanimous)	2	5:00
	Takeshi Yamazaki	def.	Koji Yoshida	Decision (Majority)	2	5:00
	Yusuke Kawaguchi	def.	Seigo Mizuguchi	TKO (Punches)	1	2:07
	Muscle Hiranuma	def.	Masanari Hosaka	TKO (Punches)	1	3:47
	Shunsuke Inoue	def.	Katsumi Yamada	TKO (Punches)	1	0:25

== Deep: clubDeep Osaka ==
Deep: clubDeep Osaka was an event held on October 13, 2007 at Azalea Taisho Hall in Osaka.

=== Results ===
Main Card
Weight class				Method	Round	Time	Notes
	Ken Hamamura	def.	Yasushi Kitazaki	Decision (Unanimous)	2	5:00
	Tomoyuki Fukami	def.	Marlon Medeiros	Submission (Rear-Naked Choke)	1	3:53
	Toru Eto	def.	Hidehira Yabu	Submission (Triangle Choke)	1	1:33
	Nobuyoshi Takahara	def.	Taiki Yonashiro	TKO (Punches)	2	4:14
	Makoto Akazawa	def.	Nobuhiro Yoshitake	Submission (Armbar)	1	2:19
	Kazumasa Otani	def.	Taro Kusano	KO (Punch)	1	3:35
	Junzo Tokunaga	def.	Teruhiko Kubo	Decision (Unanimous)	2	5:00

== Deep: clubDeep Hamamatsu ==
Deep: clubDeep Hamamatsu was an event held on October 21, 2007 at Act City in Hamamatsu.

=== Results ===
Main Card
Weight class				Method	Round	Time	Notes
	Carlos Toyota	def.	Ryosuke Kojima	Submission (Armbar)	1	0:45
	Yuki Inoue	def.	Naoki Kimura	KO (Punch)	2	1:43
	Tomoyasu Yamashita	def.	Norimasa Iwasaki	Decision (Unanimous)	2	5:00
	Akira Kibe	def.	Ryota Matsui	TKO (Punches)	1	1:01
	Daigo Ishijima	def.	Wataru Suyama	TKO (Punches)	2	1:48
	Masaaki Izena	def.	Henri Kakiuchi	Decision (Unanimous)	2	5:00
	Claudio Silva	def.	Yasuro Urayama	TKO (Punches)	1	2:52
	Yusuke Suzuki	def.	Roberto Brito	KO (Punch)	1	2:53
	Seiji Akao	def.	Hideo Matsui	KO (Punch)	1	4:32
	Hideo Matsui	def.	Akiyoshi Yamada	TKO (Punches)	1	0:53
	Seiji Akao	def.	Naoki Umehara	TKO (Punches)	1	2:19
	Yusuke Suzuki	def.	Yoshikazu Tsujima	Submission (Rear-Naked Choke)	1	2:38
	Hideo Matsui	def.	Muhammad Andy	Submission (Armbar)	1	0:59
	Akiyoshi Yamada	def.	Johnny Ono	Decision (Unanimous)	1	5:00
	Naoki Umehara	def.	Yoshikazu Kanari	TKO (Punches)	1	2:19
	Seiji Akao	def.	Norio Hasada	Decision (Unanimous)	1	5:00
	Yusuke Suzuki	def.	Takamito Kumata	KO (Punch)	1	0:14
	Roberto Brito	def.	Kazuhisa Shimotori	TKO (Punches)	1	3:26
	Hitoshi Ogasawara	def.	Hironobu Yoshida	Decision (Unanimous)	1	5:00
	Hideo Matsui	def.	Motofumi Suzuki	Submission (Armbar)	1	4:48

== Deep: clubDeep Sendai ==
Deep: clubDeep Sendai was an event held on October 28, 2007 at Zepp Sendai in Sendai.

=== Results ===
Main Card
Weight class				Method	Round	Time	Notes
	Miku Matsumoto	def.	Masako Yoshida	Submission (Armbar)	1	3:23
	Hikaru Shinohara	def.	AI AI	Submission (Neck Crank)	1	3:11
	Shigetoshi Iwase	def.	Hiroki Nagaoka	Decision (Unanimous)	2	5:00
	Koichiro Matsumoto	def.	Kosuke Umeda	TKO (Punches)	1	1:11
	Takuya Ogura	def.	Taku Kajikawa	Submission (Armbar)	1	1:20
	Luiz Andrade I	def.	Nozomu Oikawa	TKO (Punches)	1	2:44
	Masaya Doi	def.	Hayato Sasaki	Decision (Split)	2	5:00

== Deep: Kobudo Fight 1 ==
Deep: Kobudo Fight 1 was an event held on November 3, 2007 at Kobudo Martial Arts Communication Space Tiger Hall in Nagoya.

=== Results ===
Main Card
Weight class				Method	Round	Time	Notes
	Yoshinobu Kawamura	def.	Katsuhei Harada	TKO (Punches)	1	0:00
	Yasutomo Katsuki	def.	Kazuyoshi Hioki	Submission (Triangle Choke)	1	0:00
	Naoyuki Kato	def.	Mitchie Hiramatsu	Technical Submission (Kimura)	1	0:00

== Deep: clubDeep Kanazawa ==
Deep: clubDeep Kanazawa was an event held on December 9, 2007 at Ishikawa Industrial Pavilion Second Hall in Kanazawa.

=== Results ===
Main Card
Weight class				Method	Round	Time	Notes
	Miku Matsumoto	def.	Yukiko Seki	Submission (Triangle Kimura)	1	1:07
	Carlos Toyota	def.	Daijiro Matsui	TKO (Punches)	2	2:22
	Satoshi Watanabe	def.	Shinobu Aoyama	TKO (Punches)	1	4:39
	Atsushi Wakui	def.	Katsuhiko Sakamoto	Decision (Unanimous)	2	3:00
	Masayuki Demise	def.	Fuhito Hasegawa	Technical Submission (Guillotine Choke)	1	0:32
	Ryohei Arai	def.	Tamotsu Kitada	Submission (Heel Hook)	1	0:37
	Tetsuya Yoshioka	def.	Yasuto Kimura	Submission (Kimura)	1	4:44
	Yuya Osugi	def.	Mitsuhiro Okada	Submission (Armbar)	1	3:32
	Masaki Yanagisawa	def.	Kosuke Dochi	Submission (Gogoplata)	1	1:13
	Tamotsu Kitada	def.	Yuji Arai	Submission (Ankle Lock)	1	2:55
	Ryohei Arai	def.	Takami Ono	TKO (Punches)	1	N/A
	Yasuto Kimura	def.	Osamu Nakano	Submission (Guillotine Choke)	1	0:42
	Tetsuya Yoshioka	def.	Katsuhei Harada	TKO (Punches)	2	2:56
	Yuya Osugi	def.	Kengo Tada	Submission (Armbar)	1	2:26
	Masaki Yanagisawa	def.	Hideaki Onishi	Decision (Unanimous)	2	5:00

== Deep: 33 Impact ==
Deep: 33 Impact was an event held on December 12, 2007 at Korakuen Hall in Tokyo.

=== Results ===
Main Card
Weight class				Method	Round	Time	Notes
	Hidetada Irie	vs.	Yuji Sakuragi	Draw	3	5:00
	Tae Hyun Bang	def.	Jutaro Nakao	TKO (Punches)	2	1:15
	Hisae Watanabe	def.	Genkaam Lookjuapoakum	Submission (Armbar)	1	1:54
	Tsuneyoshi Kashimura	def.	Kosei Kubota	KO (Punches)	1	0:37
	Junpei Hamada	def.	Shunsuke Inoue	KO (Punches)	1	0:41
	Sojiro Orui	vs.	Masataka Chinushi	Draw	2	5:00
	Toshiaki Kitada	def.	Isamu Sugiuchi	Decision (Unanimous)	2	5:00
	Yuta Watanabe	def.	Min Suk Heo	Decision (Majority)	2	5:00
	Koichiro Matsumoto	def.	Koji Yoshida	TKO (Punches)	2	2:04
	Yasushi Kitazaki	def.	Yuki Inoue	TKO (Corner Stoppage)	1	5:00
	Teruhiko Kubo	def.	Daigo Ishijima	Submission (Kimura)	1	4:26
	Muneyuki Sato	def.	Toshiaki Saiki	TKO (Punches)	2	4:47
	Atsushi Nakasa	def.	Shinya Hisaki	Submission (Rear-Naked Choke)	1	2:31

== Deep: Protect Impact 2007 ==
Deep: Protect Impact 2007 was an event held on December 22, 2007 at Umeda Stella Hall in Osaka.

=== Results ===
Main Card
Weight class				Method	Round	Time	Notes
	Yoshiro Maeda	vs.	Jong Man Kim	Draw	3	5:00
	Seichi Ikemoto	def.	Doo Won Seo	Submission (Heel Hook)	1	2:56
	Ryuichi Murata	def.	Ho Jin Kim	Submission (Armbar)	1	3:38
	Miku Matsumoto	def.	Waenthong Sakrungreong	Technical Submission (Armbar)	1	0:43
	Hiroki Nagaoka	def.	Ken Hamamura	Decision (Unanimous)	2	5:00
	Tomoyuki Fukami	def.	Akihiko Mori	Submission (Arm-Triangle Choke)	2	1:43
	Yukinari Tamura	def.	Naoki Matsushita	TKO (Doctor Stoppage)	2	3:46
	Motoyuki Takinishi	def.	Toru Harai	Decision (Unanimous)	2	5:00
	Yusuke Sakashita	def.	Taiki Yonashiro	TKO (Punches)	2	2:18
	Takahiro Kajita	def.	Hiroshi Shiba	Decision (Majority)	2	5:00
	Isao Terada	def.	Nobuhiro Yoshitake	KO (Knee)	1	2:43
	Kosuke Eda	def.	Takashi Hasegawa	Decision (Unanimous)	2	5:00
	Hidehira Yabu	def.	Junichi Nakahira	Decision (Unanimous)	2	5:00

== See also ==
- List of Deep champions
- List of Deep events
