= Yasuhito Namekawa =

Japanese mixed martial arts fighter

Yasuhito Namekawa 滑川康仁
- Born: October 27, 1974 (age 51)
- Nationality: Japanese
- Height: 5 ft 11.5 in (1.82 m)
- Weight: 197 lb (89 kg; 14 st 1 lb)
- Division: Heavyweight; Light Heavyweight; Middleweight
- Team: Team M.A.D. Rings Japan
- Years active: 1998–present

Mixed martial arts record
- Total: 49
- Wins: 28
- By knockout: 4
- By submission: 17
- By decision: 6
- By disqualification: 1
- Losses: 16
- By knockout: 6
- By submission: 7
- By decision: 3
- Draws: 5
- No contests: 0

Other information
- Mixed martial arts record from Sherdog

Yasuhito Namekawa (Japanese: 滑川康仁, Namekawa Yasuhito) (born October 27, 1974) is a Japanese mixed martial artist who competes in the light heavyweight division. Namekawa made his mixed martial arts debut for Fighting Network RINGS in 1998. He fought in mainly shootfighting bouts until 1999 when RINGS introduced the King of King Rules and transitioned into a modern MMA promotion. Throughout his career, Namekawa has fought for organisations such as RINGS, Deep and Pride FC. His last fight to date was in 2008, with a professional mixed martial arts career spanning ten years. He also briefly competed in shoot style professional wrestling, exclusively for Kiyoshi Tamura's U-STYLE promotion.

== Mixed martial arts career ==
=== Fighting Network RINGS (1998–2002) ===
Namekawa made his debut for RINGS on June 20, 1998, against Minoru Toyonaga, the bout ended in a draw. He then went on to submit Daniel Higgins and out point Ryuki Ueyama. Namekawa suffered his first loss on October 11, 1998, against Bakouri Gogitidze, he lost by submission. On October 23, 1998, Namekawa lost to Masayuki Naruse by submission at 4:50 of round 1. He ended the year with a draw against British fighter, Lee Hasdell. On January 23, 1999, Namekawa had a rematch with Hasdell, this time Hasdell was docked a point for an illegal punch. Namekawa won by decision. On March 7, 1999, Namekawa had their third and final match, this time in Milton Keynes, England, at Night of the Samurai 3. Hasdell won by KO in 5:55 of round 1.

During the rest of 1999, Namekawa picked up victories over fighters, Troy Ittensohn, Ryuki Ueyama, Sara Umer and Minoru Toyonaga. Also losing to Wataru Sakata, Ryuki Ueyama and Koba Tkeshelashvili. The year 2000 was a bad year for Namekawa as he failed to pick up a single win, losing to, Willie Peeters, Chris Haseman, Alistair Overeem and Volk Han.

2001 would be the complete opposite to the previous year as Namekawa was victorious in 4 out of 5 fights. He defeated Takashi Sonoda, Wataru Imamura, Masutatsu Yano and Dexter Casey, all by submission. On October 20, 2001, Namekawa lost to Egidijus Valavicius by TKO.

Yasuhito Namekawa's final fight for RINGS was on February 15, 2002, on the final ever Rings event. He was submitted by Sam Nest at 4:53 of round 2.

=== Deep (2002–2004) ===
On March 30, 2002, Namekawa made his Deep debut at Deep - 4th Impact. He defeated Daisuke Watanabe by majority decision. He went on to win his next two fights in Deep with submission wins over Makoto Miyazawa and Yuki Ishikawa. On December 31, 2002, he lost to Wallid Ismail by decision at Inoki Bom-Ba-Ye 2002. Namekawa ended the year with a 3–1 record with Deep. He began 2003 with a draw with Osami Shibuya at Deep - 8th Impact. Namekawa did not fight again until January 22, 2004. He defeated Yusuke Imamura by TKO at Deep - 13th Impact.

=== Pride FC (2004) ===
On February 15, 2004, Namekawa made his Pride FC debut with a submission win over Egidijus Valavicius at Pride Bushido 2. He returned to Pride on October 14, 2004, he was defeated by Maurício Rua.

=== Return to Deep (2005–2008) ===
In his second outing in the Deep organisation, Namekawa beat Kenji Akiyama by TKO, Jong Hyuk Moon by submission and lost to Ryuta Sakurai. He also drew with Jeong Ho Lee on December 2, 2005. On April 11, 2006, Namekawa was defeated by Cyrille Diabate by KO at Deep - 24 Impact.

Namekawa beat Peter Iryaku at VFX - Vale Tudo Fighters Mexico before losing to Cyrille Diabate in a rematch on July 30, 2006. He then defeated Mu Jin Na by submission.

Upon returning to Deep, Namekawa remained undefeated during the rest of his time there. Drawing with Fabiano Capoani and defeating Yuji Sakuragi, Hamish Robertson, Katsuhisa Fujii, Carlos Toyota and Claudio Silva. Namekawa's last fight to date was against Katsuyori Shibata at Deep - 38 Impact on October 23, 2008. The fight ended in a draw.

== Mixed martial arts record ==
Professional record breakdown
49 matches	28 wins	16 losses
By knockout	4	6
By submission	17	7
By decision	6	3
By disqualification	1	0
Draws	5	

Res.	Record	Opponent	Method	Event	Date	Round	Time	Location	Notes
Draw	28–16–5	Katsuyori Shibata	Draw	Deep: 38 Impact	October 23, 2008	3	5:00	Tokyo, Japan	Catchweight (189.6 lb) bout.
Win	28–16–4	Cláudio Silva	Submission (armbar)	Deep: 37 Impact	August 17, 2008	1	2:59	Tokyo, Japan	Catchweight (198.4 lb) bout.
Win	27–16–4	Carlos Toyota	Submission (achilles lock)	Deep: 34 Impact	February 22, 2008	1	2:58	Tokyo, Japan	Openweight bout.
Win	26–16–4	Katsuhisa Fujii	Decision (majority)	Deep: 32 Impact	October 9, 2007	2	5:00	Tokyo, Japan	
Win	25–16–4	Hamish Robertson	Submission (half crab lock)	Deep: Glove	July 26, 2007	1	1:06	Tokyo, Japan	
Win	24–16–4	Yuji Sakuragi	Submission (heel hook)	Deep: 29 Impact	April 13, 2007	1	2:12	Tokyo, Japan	
Draw	23–16–4	Fabiano Capoani	Draw	Deep: 28 Impact	February 16, 2007	2	5:00	Tokyo, Japan	
Win	23–16–3	Mu Jin Na	Submission (armbar)	Heat: Heat 2	September 23, 2006	1	1:45	Aichi, Japan	
Loss	22–16–3	Cyrille Diabaté	KO (flying knee)	Real Rhythm: 4th Stage	July 30, 2006	2	1:50	Osaka, Japan	
Win	22–15–3	Peter Iryaku	KO	VFX: Vale Tudo Fighters Mexico	May 27, 2006	2	1:00	Tláhuac, Mexico	
Loss	21–15–3	Cyrille Diabaté	KO (punches)	Deep: 24 Impact	April 11, 2006	2	2:22	Tokyo, Japan	Return to Light Heavyweight.
Draw	21–14–3	Jeong Ho Lee	Draw	Deep: 22 Impact	December 2, 2005	2	5:00	Tokyo, Japan	
Win	21–14–2	Jong Hyuk Moon	Submission (forearm choke)	Deep: 21st Impact	October 28, 2005	1	2:33	Tokyo, Japan	
Loss	20–14–2	Ryuta Sakurai	Submission (armbar)	Deep: 19th Impact	July 8, 2005	1	4:40	Tokyo, Japan	
Win	20–13–2	Kenji Akiyama	TKO (punches)	Deep: Hero 1	April 17, 2005	1	3:48	Nagoya, Aichi, Japan	
Loss	19–13–2	Maurício Rua	TKO (punches)	Pride Bushido 5	October 14, 2004	1	6:02	Osaka, Japan	Return to Middleweight.
Win	19–12–2	Fabiano Capoani	DQ (knee to the groin)	Gladiator FC: Day 1	June 26, 2004	2	1:07	South Korea	
Win	18–12–2	Egidijus Valavicius	Submission (guillotine choke)	Pride Bushido 2	February 15, 2004	1	1:05	Yokohama, Kanagawa, Japan	
Win	17–12–2	Yusuke Imamura	TKO (punches)	Deep: 13th Impact	March 4, 2004	2	3:22	Tokyo, Japan	Openweight bout.
Draw	16–12–2	Osami Shibuya	Draw	Deep: 8th Impact	March 4, 2003	3	5:00	Tokyo, Japan	
Loss	16–12–1	Wallid Ismail	Decision (unanimous)	Inoki Bom-Ba-Ye 2002: K-1 vs. Inoki	December 31, 2002	3	5:00	Saitama, Japan	Middleweight bout.
Win	16–11–1	Yuki Ishikawa	Submission (punches)	Deep: 7th Impact	December 8, 2002	1	3:46	Tokyo, Japan	Openweight bout.
Win	15–11–1	Makoto Miyazawa	Submission (guillotine choke)	Deep: 6th Impact	September 7, 2002	3	2:37	Tokyo, Japan	
Win	14–11–1	Daisuke Watanabe	Decision (majority)	Deep: 4th Impact	March 30, 2002	3	5:00	Nagoya, Aichi, Japan	
Loss	13–11–1	Sam Nest	Submission (rear-naked choke)	Rings: World Title Series Grand Final	February 15, 2002	2	4:53	Yokohama, Kanagawa, Japan	
Loss	13–10–1	Egidijus Valavicius	TKO (corner stoppage)	Rings: World Title Series 4	October 20, 2001	1	2:18	Tokyo, Japan	Heavyweight bout.
Win	13–9–1	Dexter Casey	Submission (guillotine choke)	Rings: Battle Genesis Vol. 8	September 21, 2001	1	1:44	Tokyo, Japan	
Win	12–9–1	Masutatsu Yano	Submission (guillotine choke)	Rings: World Title Series 2	June 15, 2001	2	0:22	Tokyo, Japan	
Win	11–9–1	Hiroshi Imamura	Submission (kneebar)	Rings: World Title Series 1	April 20, 2001	1	1:48	Tokyo, Japan	
Win	10–9–1	Takashi Sonoda	Submission (armbar)	Rings: Battle Genesis Vol. 7	March 20, 2001	1	0:43	Tokyo, Japan	
Loss	9–9–1	Chris Haseman	Submission (kimura)	Rings USA: Rising Stars Final	September 30, 2000	1	1:30	Moline, Illinois, United States	
Win	9–8–1	Chris Munsen	Decision (majority)	Rings USA: Rising Stars Block B	July 22, 2000	2	5:00	Honolulu, Hawaii, United States	
Win	8–8–1	Falaniko Vitale	Submission (guillotine choke)	Rings USA: Rising Stars Block B	July 22, 2000	2	0:27	Honolulu, Hawaii, United States	Return to Light Heavyweight.
Loss	7–8–1	Volk Han	Decision	Rings Russia: Russia vs. The World	May 20, 2000	3	5:00	Yekaterinburg, Sverdlovsk Oblast, Russia	
Loss	7–7–1	Alistair Overeem	Submission (armbar)	Rings: Millennium Combine 1	April 20, 2000	1	0:45	Tokyo, Japan	
Loss	7–6–1	Chris Haseman	Submission (guillotine choke)	Rings Australia: NR 4	March 19, 2000	1	6:50	Brisbane, Queensland, Australia	
Loss	7–5–1	Willie Peeters	TKO (knee to the body)	Rings Holland: There Can Only Be One Champion	February 6, 2000	2	4:56	Utrecht City, Netherlands	
Loss	7–4–1	Koba Tkeshelashvili	Submission (rear-naked choke)	Rings: Rings Georgia	October 8, 1999	1	6:15	Georgia (country)	Return to Heavyweight.
Loss	7–3–1	Ryuki Ueyama	Decision (lost points)	Rings: Rise 5th	August 19, 1999	3	5:00	Japan	
Win	7–2–1	Minoru Toyonaga	Submission (guillotine choke)	Rings: Rise 4th	June 24, 1999	1	9:51	Japan	
Win	6–2–1	Sara Umer	Submission (rear-naked choke)	Rings: Rise 3rd	March 22, 1999	1	3:09	Japan	Return to Light Heavyweight.
Loss	5–2–1	Chris Haseman	Submission (arm-triangle choke)	Rings: Rise 1st	March 20, 1999	1	7:42	Japan	
Loss	5–1–1	Lee Hasdell	KO (knee)	NOTS 3: Night of the Samurai 3	March 7, 1999	2	N/A	Milton Keynes, England	
Win	5–0–1	Ryuki Ueyama	Decision	Rings: Final Capture	February 21, 1999	3	5:00	Japan	Middleweight bout.
Win	4–0–1	Lee Hasdell	Decision	Rings: World Mega Battle Tournament 1998 Grand Final	January 23, 1999	1	20:00	Tokyo, Japan	Return to Heavyweight.
Win	3–0–1	Ryuki Ueyama	Decision	Rings: Sixth Fighting Integration	September 21, 1998	1	15:00	Yokohama, Japan	Middleweight debut.
Win	2–0–1	Daniel Higgins	Submission (achilles lock)	Rings: Fifth Fighting Integration	August 28, 1998	1	14:28	Niigata, Japan	Light Heavyweight debut.
Win	1–0–1	Troy Ittensohn	TKO (knees)	Rings: Fourth Fighting Integration	June 27, 1998	2	1:43	Tokyo, Japan	
Draw	0–0–1	Minoru Toyonaga	Draw	Rings: Battle Genesis 4	June 20, 1998	1	15:00	Tokyo, Japan	
