= Ryuta Sakurai =

Japanese mixed martial arts fighter

Ryuta Sakurai 桜井隆多
- Born: September 18, 1971 (age 55); Japan
- Other names: Mr. DEEP
- Nationality: Japanese
- Height: 5 ft 10 in (1.78 m)
- Weight: 185 lb (84 kg; 13.2 st)
- Division: Middleweight; Welterweight
- Stance: Orthodox
- Fighting out of: Tokyo, Japan
- Team: R-Blood
- Rank: A Class shootist
- Years active: 1996-present

Mixed martial arts record
- Total: 64
- Wins: 30
- By knockout: 11
- By submission: 12
- By decision: 7
- Losses: 28
- By knockout: 8
- By submission: 9
- By decision: 11
- Draws: 6

Other information
- Mixed martial arts record from Sherdog

Ryuta Sakurai Japanese: 桜井隆多(born September 8, 1971) is a Japanese mixed martial artist who currently competes in the middleweight division. A veteran who fought for many companies such as Shooto, Pancrase and PRIDE. Nicknamed Mr. DEEP, he is best known for spending most of his fighting career in DEEP, where he is a former DEEP Middleweight champion.

== Career ==
=== DEEP ===
Sakurai defeated Ryuki Ueyama at Deep: 17 Impact on December 18, 2004, by technical knockout in the first round to win the championship. Sakurai would lose the title in February 2006 to Ryo Chonan at Deep: 23rd Impact in the first round due to a cut. He would challenge for the championship in a rematch against rival Riki Fukuda at Deep: 40 Impact, where he lost via unanimous decision.

His last fight in DEEP to date was at Deep: 87 Impact on December 21, 2018, to a second round submission loss to Tatsuya Mizuno.

== Championship and accomplishments ==
- DEEP
  - DEEP Middleweight Championship (1 time)
- GRACHAN
  - GRAND Welterweight Championship (1 time)
- Shooto
  - 5th All Japan Amateur Shooto Light Heavyweight Championship tournament winner (1998)

== Mixed martial arts record ==
Professional record breakdown
64 matches	30 wins	28 losses
By knockout	11	8
By submission	12	9
By decision	7	11
Draws	6	

Res.	Record	Opponent	Method	Event	Date	Round	Time	Location	Notes
Win	30–28–6	Tadahide Aoki	Decision (unanimous)	GRACHAN 68 x Brave Fight 31	March 9, 2024	3	5:00	Tokyo, Japan	Won the inaugural GRACHAN Welterweight Championship.
Win	29–28–6	Kento Ueda	Submission (armbar)	GRACHAN 65: 15 Years Anniversary	October 15, 2023	2	4:10	Tokyo, Japan	Return to Welterweight.
Loss	28–28–6	Ko Seok-hyun	TKO (punches)	AFC 24 x HEAT 51	April 6, 2023	2	0:56	Gwangmyeong, South Korea	Return to Middleweight. For the Angel Fighting Championship Middleweight Championship.
Loss	28–27–6	Hidetaka Arato	Technical Decision (unanimous)	GRACHAN 58	December 4, 2022	2	4:48	Chiba, Japan	
Win	28–26–6	Radek Hecl	TKO (punches)	GRACHAN 57	September 4, 2022	2	0:34	Chiba, Japan	
Loss	27–26–6	Hiroki Nagaoka	Decision (unanimous)	GRACHAN 48	June 20, 2021	3	5:00	Ōta, Japan	Lost the GRACHAN Grand Welterweight Championship.
Win	27–25–6	Daryl Lokoku	Submission (armbar)	GRACHAN 42 x GLADIATOR 011	December 21, 2019	2	2:56	Ōta, Japan	For the GRACHAN Grand Welterweight Championship.
Win	26–25–6	Akihito Mamiya	Decision (unanimous)	BRAVE FIGHT 18 x GRACHAN 39	March 10, 2019	2	2:53	Ōta, Japan	Return to Welterweight.
Loss	25–25–6	Tatsuya Mizuno	Submission (rear naked choke)	Deep 87 Impact	December 22, 2018	2	2:53	Tokyo, Japan	
Win	25–24–6	Hikaru Sato	TKO (punches)	Pancrase 289	August 20, 2017	2	0:23	Tokyo, Japan	Return to Middleweight.
Loss	24–24–6	Yoichiro Sato	Submission (guillotine choke)	Deep: 78 Impact	March 18, 2017	2	1:22	Tokyo, Japan	
Loss	24–23–6	Taisuke Okuno	Decision (split)	Deep: Cage Impact 2016	October 18, 2016	3	5:00	Tokyo, Japan	
Loss	24–22–6	Yushin Okami	TKO (corner stoppage)	Deep: 75 Impact	February 27, 2016	2	4:23	Tokyo, Japan	Return to Welterweight.
Loss	24–21–6	Svetlozar Savov	Submission (guillotine choke)	Abu Dhabi Warriors 2	March 26, 2015	1	4:20	Abu Dhabi, United Arab Emirates	
Loss	24–20–6	Ken Hasegawa	Submission (keylock)	Deep: 71 Impact	February 28, 2015	1	4:10	Tokyo, Japan	
Loss	24–19–6	Yoshiyuki Nakanishi	Decision (unanimous)	Deep: 69 Impact	October 26, 2014	3	5:00	Tokyo, Japan	
Loss	24–18–6	Mamed Khalidov	Submission (triangle choke)	KSW 25: Khalidov vs. Sakurai 2	December 7, 2013	1	2:03	Wrocław, Poland	
Win	24–17–6	Yuji Sakuragi	KO (punch and flying knee)	Deep: Cage Impact 2013	June 15, 2013	1	1:04	Tokyo, Japan	
Win	23–17–6	Hiromitsu Kanehara	Submission (arm-triangle choke)	Deep: Haleo Impact	December 22, 2012	3	0:46	Tokyo, Japan	
Loss	22–17–6	Kazuhiro Nakamura	Decision (majority)	Deep: 60 Impact	October 19, 2012	3	5:00	Tokyo, Japan	
Win	22–16–6	Katsuyori Shibata	TKO (punches)	Deep: 55 Impact	August 26, 2011	2	3:04	Tokyo, Japan	
Win	21–16–6	Yoshiyuki Nakanishi	Submission (armbar)	Deep: 52 Impact	February 25, 2011	3	3:48	Tokyo, Japan	
Loss	20–16–6	Riki Fukuda	TKO (knees)	Deep: 49 Impact	August 27, 2010	2	0:32	Tokyo, Japan	For the DEEP Middleweight Championship.
Draw	20–15–6	Mamed Khalidov	Draw (unanimous)	KSW 13: Kumite	May 7, 2010	4	3:00	Katowice, Poland	For the KSW Light Heavyweight Championship.
Win	20–15–5	Hiroki Sato	KO (punch)	Deep: Cage Impact 2009	December 19, 2009	1	2:13	Tokyo, Japan	
Win	19–15–5	Hosea Ware	Submission (straight armbar)	Deep: 44 Impact	October 10, 2009	1	3:46	Tokyo, Japan	
Draw	18–15–5	Hiromitsu Kanehara	Draw (majority)	Deep: 42 Impact	June 30, 2009	2	5:00	Tokyo, Japan	
Loss	18–15–4	Riki Fukuda	TKO (punches)	Deep: 40 Impact	February 20, 2009	1	0:45	Tokyo, Japan	
Win	18–14–4	Sojiro Orui	Decision (split)	Deep: 38 Impact	October 23, 2008	2	5:00	Tokyo, Japan	
Win	17–14–4	Kozo Urita	Submission (armbar)	Deep: 37 Impact	August 17, 2008	1	3:22	Tokyo, Japan	
Win	16–14–4	Young Choi	Decision (unanimous)	Deep: 35 Impact	May 19, 2008	2	5:00	Tokyo, Japan	
Loss	15–14–4	Riki Fukuda	Decision (unanimous)	Deep: 34 Impact	February 22, 2008	3	5:00	Tokyo, Japan	
Win	15–13–4	Eiji Ishikawa	TKO (cut)	Deep: 32 Impact	October 9, 2007	1	5:00	Tokyo, Japan	
Loss	14–13–4	Murilo Bustamante	KO (punch)	Deep: 29 Impact	April 13, 2007	1	3:50	Tokyo, Japan	
Loss	14–12–4	Ryo Chonan	Decision (majority)	Deep: 28 Impact	February 16, 2007	3	5:00	Tokyo, Japan	For the DEEP Middleweight Championship.
Win	14–11–4	Geovani Pereira	Submission (kimura)	Deep: 27 Impact	December 20, 2006	1	0:57	Tokyo, Japan	
Win	13–11–4	Xavier Foupa-Pokam	Technical Submission (armbar)	Deep: 25 Impact	August 4, 2006	1	4:47	Tokyo, Japan	
Loss	12–11–4	Ryo Chonan	TKO (cut)	Deep: 23 Impact	February 5, 2006	1	1:57	Tokyo, Japan	Lost the DEEP Middleweight Championship.
Loss	12–10–4	Paulo Filho	Submission (armbar)	Pride: Bushido 9	September 25, 2005	1	3:49	Tokyo, Japan	Welterweight bout.
Win	12–9–4	Yasuhito Namekawa	Submission (armbar)	Deep: 19th Impact	July 8, 2005	1	4:40	Tokyo, Japan	Catchweight (187 lb) bout.
Loss	11–9–4	Murilo Bustamante	Decision (unanimous)	Pride: Bushido 6	April 3, 2005	2	5:00	Yokohama, Japan	Welterweight bout.
Win	11–8–4	Ryuki Ueyama	TKO (punches)	Deep: 17th Impact	December 18, 2004	1	2:40	Tokyo	Won the DEEP Middleweight Championship.
Win	10–8–4	David Bielkheden	Decision (unanimous)	Shooto: 7/16 in Korakuen Hall	July 16, 2004	3	5:00	Tokyo, Japan	
Loss	9–8–4	Yushin Okami	Decision (unanimous)	Pride: Bushido 2	February 15, 2004	2	5:00	Yokohama, Japan	
Win	9–7–4	Tetsuya Onose	KO (punches)	Deep: 13th Impact	January 22, 2004	1	0:56	Tokyo	
Win	8–7–4	Hirohide Fujinuma	Submission (kimura)	Deep: 12th Impact	September 15, 2003	1	3:46	Tokyo, Japan	Open Weight bout.
Loss	7–7–4	Eiji Ishikawa	TKO (punches)	Deep: 9th Impact	May 5, 2003	2	4:22	Tokyo, Japan	
Win	7–6–4	John Renken	Submission (kimura)	Shooto: 2/23 in Korakuen Hall	February 23, 2003	2	3:09	Tokyo, Japan	
Win	6–6–4	Yuichi Nakanishi	Decision (unanimous)	Shooto: 1/24 in Korakuen Hall	January 24, 2003	2	5:00	Tokyo, Japan	
Win	5–6–4	Jun Kitagawa	TKO (cut)	Shooto: Gig West 3	October 27, 2002	1	3:23	Osaka, Japan	Welterweight bout.
Draw	4–6–4	Masato Nishiguchi	Draw (unanimous)	Shooto: Gig East 10	August 27, 2002	2	5:00	Tokyo, Japan	
Draw	4–6–3	Marcelo Machado	Draw (unanimous)	Shooto: Treasure Hunt 4	March 13, 2002	2	5:00	Setagaya, Tokyo, Japan	
Win	4–6–2	Nathan Schouteren	Submission (armbar)	Shooto Holland: Night of the Warriors	November 4, 2001	1	1:27	Deventer, Netherlands	Return to Middleweight.
Loss	3–6–2	Shiko Yamashita	Decision (unanimous)	Shooto: Gig East 3	June 14, 2001	2	5:00	Tokyo, Japan	Welterweight debut.
Draw	3–5–2	Izuru Takeuchi	Draw	Shooto: Gateway to the Extremes	November 4, 1999	2	5:00	Setagaya, Tokyo, Japan	
Loss	3–5–1	Jun Kitagawa	Decision (unanimous)	Shooto: Renaxis 3	August 4, 1999	2	5:00	Setagaya, Tokyo, Japan	
Loss	3–4–1	Yuki Sasaki	Submission (heel hook)	Shooto: Shooter's Passion	May 27, 1999	1	2:00	Setagaya, Tokyo, Japan	
Loss	3–3–1	Cyrille Diabate	TKO	GT: Golden Trophy 1999	March 20, 1999	2	0:00	France	
Win	3–2–1	Nobuhiro Tsurumaki	TKO (cut)	Shooto: Shooter's Soul	January 27, 1999	1	0:54	Setagaya, Tokyo, Japan	
Draw	2–2–1	Izuru Takeuchi	Draw (majority)	Shooto: Las Grandes Viajes 6	November 27, 1998	2	5:00	Tokyo, Japan	
Win	2–2	Masashi Kita	TKO (punches)	Shooto: Shooter's Dream	September 18, 1998	1	3:00	Setagaya, Tokyo, Japan	
Loss	1–2	Masanori Suda	Submission (armbar)	Lumax Cup: Tournament of J '97 Heavyweight Tournament	July 27, 1997	1	4:25	Japan	
Loss	1–1	Hiroyuki Yoshioka	Submission (armbar)	Lumax Cup: Tournament of J '96	March 30, 1996	1	3:38	Japan	
Win	1–0	Katsuhisa Fujii	Decision	Lumax Cup: Tournament of J '96	March 30, 1996	2	3:00	Japan	Middleweight debut.

== See also ==
- List of male mixed martial artists
