= 2006 in Deep =

Mixed martial arts events

Information
- First date: February 5, 2006
- Last date: December 20, 2006

Events
- Total events: 13

Fights
- Total fights: 214
- Title fights: 4

Chronology
2005 in Deep	2006 in Deep	2007 in Deep

The year 2006 was the sixth year in the history of Deep, a mixed martial arts promotion based in Japan. In 2006 Deep held 13 events beginning with, Deep: 23 Impact.

== Title fights ==
Title fights in 2006
Weight class				Method	Round	Time	Event	Notes
Middleweight	Ryo Chonan	def.	Ryuta Sakurai (c)	TKO (Cut)	1	1:57	Deep: 23 Impact	(Note: For the Deep Middleweight Championship.)
Lightweight	Nobuhiro Obiya (c)	def.	Ryan Bow	Decision (Unanimous)	3	5:00	Deep: 24 Impact	(Note: For the Deep Lightweight Championship.)
Featherweight	Masakazu Imanari (c)	def.	Takeshi Yamazaki	KO (Upkick)	3	1:49	Deep: 26 Impact	(Note: For the Deep Featherweight Championship.)
Lightweight	Hisae Watanabe	def.	Satoko Shinashi	KO (Punch)	1	3:54	Deep: 25 Impact	(Note: For the Deep Women's Lightweight Championship.)

== Events list ==
#	Event title	Date	Arena	Location
49	Deep: 27 Impact	December 20, 2006	Korakuen Hall	Tokyo
48	Deep: clubDeep Tokyo: Future King Tournament 2006	December 9, 2006	Shinjuku Face	Tokyo
47	Deep: clubDeep Toyama: Barbarian Festival 5	November 19, 2006	Toyama Event Plaza	Toyama
46	Deep: 26 Impact	October 10, 2006	Korakuen Hall	Tokyo
45	Deep: clubDeep Hakuba: Monster Challenge 2	August 12, 2006	Hakuba47 Mountain Sports Park	Hakuba
44	Deep: 25 Impact	August 4, 2006	Korakuen Hall	Tokyo
43	Deep: clubDeep Tokyo	July 8, 2006	Shinjuku Face	Tokyo
42	Deep: clubDeep Toyama: Barbarian Festival 4	June 18, 2006	Toyama Event Plaza	Toyama
41	Deep: clubDeep Hiroshima: Monster Challenger	May 27, 2006	Saekiku Sports Center Subarena	Hiroshima
40	Deep: CMA Festival	May 24, 2006	Korakuen Hall	Tokyo
39	Deep: clubDeep Nagoya: MB3z Impact, Di Entrare	May 21, 2006	Zepp Nagoya	Nagoya
38	Deep: 24 Impact	April 11, 2006	Korakuen Hall	Tokyo
37	Deep: 23 Impact	February 5, 2006	Korakuen Hall	Tokyo

== Deep: 23 Impact ==
Deep: 23 Impact was an event held on February 5, 2006 at Korakuen Hall in Tokyo.

=== Results ===
Main Card
Weight class				Method	Round	Time	Notes
Middleweight	Ryo Chonan	def.	Ryuta Sakurai (c)	TKO (Cut)	1	1:57	(Note: For the Deep Middleweight Championship.)
	Kazuo Misaki	def.	Akira Shoji	Technical Submission (Guillotine Choke)	1	2:32
	Hidehiko Hasegawa	def.	Shigetoshi Iwase	Decision (Majority)	2	5:00
	Yoshihiro Tomioka	def.	Hiroki Nagaoka	Decision (Split)	2	5:00
	Daisuke Nakamura	def.	Hirohide Fujinuma	Submission (Armbar)	1	0:52
	Nick Ring	def.	Ryuichi Murata	Decision (Unanimous)	2	5:00
	Yuya Shirai	def.	Tomoyoshi Iwamiya	Decision (Unanimous)	2	5:00
	Kazunori Yokota	def.	Kosuke Umeda	TKO (Punches)	2	4:05
	Miku Matsumoto	def.	Yuki Furudate	Submission (Rear-Naked Choke)	1	2:52
	Yutaro Miyamoto	vs.	Jeong Ho Lee	Draw	2	5:00
	Gotoku Onda	def.	Junpei Hamada	Decision (Unanimous)	2	5:00
	Tsuneyoshi Kashimura	def.	Jun Ando	Decision (Split)	2	5:00
	Yukinari Tamura	def.	Katsunori Kikuno	Decision (Unanimous)	2	5:00
	Ayumu Kobayashi	def.	Yoshihiro Koyama	Decision (Unanimous)	2	5:00
	Shinji Ejiri	def.	Motomare Takahashi	Decision (Split)	2	5:00

== Deep: 24 Impact ==
Deep: 24 Impact was an event held on April 11, 2006 at Korakuen Hall in Tokyo.

=== Results ===
Main Card
Weight class				Method	Round	Time	Notes
Lightweight	Nobuhiro Obiya (c)	def.	Ryan Bow	Decision (Unanimous)	3	5:00	(Note: For the Deep Lightweight Championship.)
	Cyrille Diabate	def.	Yasuhito Namekawa	KO (Punches)	2	2:22
	Kazunori Yokota	vs.	Milton Vieira	Draw	2	5:00
	Yoshihiro Tomioka	def.	Cicero Costa	Decision (Unanimous)	2	5:00
	Satoko Shinashi	def.	Shiho Yamato	Submission (Armbar)	2	2:20
	Gegard Mousasi	def.	Hidetada Irie	TKO (Corner Stoppage)	2	1:29
	Hidehiko Hasegawa	def.	Quinton Arendse	Decision (Unanimous)	2	5:00
	Joey Villasenor	def.	Yuya Shirai	Decision (Unanimous)	2	5:00
	Takeshi Yamazaki	def.	Hirotaka Miyakawa	Submission (Armbar)	1	4:44
	Muscle Hiranuma	def.	Soichi Nishida	Submission (Rear-Naked Choke)	1	1:02
	Sen Nakadai	def.	Yutaro Miyamoto	TKO (Punches)	1	3:14
	Kazutaka Omigawa	vs.	Goro Kobayashi	Draw	2	5:00
	Ryota Uozumi	def.	Tsuyoshi Yamazaki	Submission (Armbar)	1	2:03
	Ryoji Suzuki	def.	Makoto Ikeda	KO (Punch)	1	1:09

== Deep: clubDeep Nagoya: MB3z Impact, Di Entrare ==
Deep: clubDeep Nagoya: MB3z Impact, Di Entrare was an event held on May 21, 2006 at Zepp Nagoya in Nagoya.

=== Results ===
Main Card
Weight class				Method	Round	Time	Notes
	Naoki Matsushita	def.	Hiroki Nagaoka	TKO (Punches)	2	0:19
	Isamu Sugiuchi	def.	Takeshi Matsushita	TKO (Punches)	1	1:06
	Hiroshi Umemura	def.	Yuichiro Shirai	Submission (Rear Naked Choke)	1	4:07
	Ryuichi Murata	def.	Seiki Ryo	Decision (Unanimous)	2	5:00
	Shinji Ejiri	def.	Atsuhiro Tsuboi	Decision (Unanimous)	2	5:00
	Naoki Kimura	def.	Noritaka Sasamoto	Submission (Armbar)	1	4:28
	Takahiro Kajita	def.	Rodrigo Facca Matsunaga	TKO (Punches)	1	3:19
	Kenichi Hattori	vs.	Yukinari Tamura	Draw	2	5:00
	Luis Ramos	def.	Hitoyo Kimura	Decision (Majority)	2	5:00
	Takumi Shimazaki	def.	Ezekiel Zayas	Submission (Armbar)	2	4:26
	Geovani Pereira	def.	Yukiharu Maejima	TKO (Punches)	1	0:22
	Ryo Nakajima	def.	Hiromu Nagado	Decision (Unanimous)	2	3:00
	Kunihiro Watanabe	vs.	Henri Kakiuchi	Draw	2	3:00
	Takayuki Muramatsu	def.	Mitsuhisa Nishimura	Decision (Majority)	2	3:00

== Deep: CMA Festival ==
Deep: CMA Festival was an event held on May 24, 2006 at Korakuen Hall in Tokyo.

=== Results ===
Main Card
Weight class				Method	Round	Time	Notes
	Ikuhisa Minowa	def.	Hyun Gab Park	Submission (Heel Hook)	1	0:17
	Yoko Takahashi	def.	Yong Joo Lee	Submission (Heel Hook)	2	0:47
	Yoshinori Kawakami	def.	Mun Seok Jung	TKO (Doctor Stoppage)	1	3:40
	Gotoku Onda	def.	Sang Soo Lee	KO (Punches)	2	1:01
	Kosei Kubota	def.	Ban Sun Han	Submission (Heel Hook)	1	1:58
	Dong Hyun Kim	def.	Mitsunori Tanimura	Submission (Rear Naked Choke)	1	4:28
	Ken Hamamura	def.	Chung Hyun Kim	Submission (Rear Naked Choke)	1	0:41
	Flavio Tanaka	def.	Kim Han Wu	Submission (Triangle Choke)	1	3:08

== Deep: clubDeep Hiroshima: Monster Challenger ==
Deep: clubDeep Hiroshima: Monster Challenger was an event held on May 27, 2006 at the Saekiku Sports Center Subarena in Hiroshima.

=== Results ===
Main Card
Weight class				Method	Round	Time	Notes
	Quinton Arendse	def.	Manao Kumagai	Decision (Majority)	2	5:00
	Luiz Andrade I	def.	Satoru Takadaya	KO (Punches)	1	2:39
	Akihiko Mori	def.	Yasuki Munemoto	TKO (Punches)	1	0:39
	Hiroki Tanaka	def.	Yasushi Kitazaki	TKO (Punches)	2	2:31
	Daiki Nagasako	def.	Takao Tamura	TKO (Punches)	2	1:03
	Takashi Hasegawa	def.	Seichi Okino	Submission (Guillotine Choke)	2	3:46
	Akira Yasumura	vs.	Yoshitaka Ideta	Draw	1	5:00
	Ryohei Arai	vs.	Takaaki Oban	Draw	1	5:00
	Yutaro Okimoto	vs.	Tomoyasu Yamashita	Draw	1	5:00
	Toru Harai	vs.	Makoto Akazawa	Draw	1	5:00
	Kenji Ezaki	def.	Hiroyuki Kanzaki	Submission (Armbar)	1	1:05
	Takuro Nishimura	vs.	Tsubasa Akiyama	Draw	1	5:00
	Taizo Tsuruoka	def.	Seiji Fukuoka	Submission (Rear-Naked Choke)	1	4:21

== Deep: clubDeep Toyama: Barbarian Festival 4 ==
Deep: clubDeep Toyama: Barbarian Festival 4 was an event held on June 18, 2006 at Toyama Event Plaza in Toyama.

=== Results ===
Main Card
Weight class				Method	Round	Time	Notes
	Yoshihiro Tomioka	def.	Michihiro Omigawa	Decision (Unanimous)	3	5:00
	Miku Matsumoto	def.	Yayoi Okubo	Submission (Armbar)	1	0:53
	Seigo Mizuguchi	def.	Soichi Nishida	TKO (Punches)	1	1:14
	Yuichi Ikari	def.	Yutaka Ueda	Decision (Majority)	2	5:00
	Tsuyoshi Kurihara	def.	Claudio Silva	Submission (Armbar)	1	2:13
	Hiroyuki Mizutani	def.	Ryuichi Nozawa	TKO (Punches)	1	0:59
	Yasunori Minami	def.	Isamu Isamu	TKO (Punches)	1	2:45
	Takehiko Naito	def.	Hedo Hedo	Decision (Split)	2	5:00
	Takaaki Aoki	def.	Kazuhide Terashita	Submission (Triangle Choke)	2	1:01
	Joji Kawamata	vs.	Shun Takahashi	Draw	2	5:00
	Masaki Yagyu	vs.	Yuya Osugi	Draw	2	5:00
	Yuki Yashima	def.	Shinichiro Tanaka	KO (Punch)	1	0:39
	Jun Osawa	vs.	Yoshiaki Tamazawa	Draw	2	5:00

== Deep: clubDeep Tokyo ==
Deep: clubDeep Tokyo was an event held on July 8, 2006 at Shinjuku Face in Tokyo.

=== Results ===
Main Card
Weight class				Method	Round	Time	Notes
	Takahiro Oba	def.	Ryuji Ohori	TKO (Punches)	2	3:52
	Fabricio Monteiro	def.	Hiroyuki Abe	Submission (Toe Hold)	2	1:53
	Hiroki Nagaoka	vs.	Yuki Inoue	Draw	2	5:00
	Hidenobu Koike	def.	Sen Nakadai	Submission (Triangle Choke)	2	2:43
	Noboru Onishi	def.	Ryuhei Sato	KO (Punches)	2	1:27
	Kosuke Umeda	def.	Soo Jun Han	Submission (Armbar)	1	1:28
	Yuta Watanabe	def.	Junpei Hamada	Submission (Rear-Naked Choke)	1	1:58
	Tomohiko Hori	def.	Shinji Ejiri	KO (Punches)	1	4:27
	Tomoyoshi Iwamiya	def.	Tomoki Kanuka	TKO (Punches)	1	1:51
	Hiroshi Nakano	def.	Hitoyo Kimura	Submission (Armbar)	2	1:41
	Luiz Andrade I	vs.	Katsunori Kikuno	Draw	2	5:00
	Motomare Takahashi	vs.	Seiji Ozuka	Draw	2	5:00
	Jun Ando	def.	Hiromu Nagado	TKO (Corner Stoppage)	1	1:47
	Kazutaka Omigawa	def.	Jin Hirano	KO (Punch)	1	0:42
	Sofuku Ra	def.	Yujiro Harashima	TKO (Punches)	2	0:49
	Shingo Matsuda	def.	Kosuke Takahashi	Submission (Armbar)	1	3:30
	Takahisa Shinohara	vs.	Seita Kachiki	Draw	2	5:00
	Akira Koie	vs.	Masato Kirita	Draw	2	5:00
	Takao Nakajima	def.	Koji Omiyama	Submission (Rear-Naked Choke)	1	4:37

== Deep: 25 Impact ==
Deep: 25 Impact was an event held on August 4, 2006 at Korakuen Hall in Tokyo.

=== Results ===
Main Card
Weight class				Method	Round	Time	Notes
	Ryuta Sakurai	def.	Xavier Foupa-Pokam	Technical Submission (Armbar)	1	4:47
Lightweight	Hisae Watanabe	def.	Satoko Shinashi	KO (Punch)	1	3:54	(Note: For the Deep Women's Lightweight Championship.)
	Jutaro Nakao	def.	Kosei Kubota	TKO (Soccer Kicks)	2	2:08
	Fredson Paixao	def.	Masakazu Imanari	Decision (Majority)	3	5:00
	Ryan Bow	vs.	Hidehiko Hasegawa	Draw	2	5:00
	Takeshi Yamazaki	def.	Isamu Sugiuchi	Decision (Unanimous)	2	5:00
	Anthony Netzler	def.	Muscle Hiranuma	KO (Punch)	1	0:20
	Roan Carneiro	def.	Daisuke Ishii	Decision (Unanimous)	3	5:00
	Dong Hyun Kim	def.	Tomoyoshi Iwamiya	Decision (Unanimous)	2	5:00
	Tomohiko Hori	def.	Kazutaka Omigawa	TKO (Punches)	1	4:55
	Yutaka Kobayashi	def.	Chikara Sato	KO (Knee)	1	0:07
	Yuki Ito	def.	Luiz Andrade I	Submission (Guillotine Choke)	1	3:01
	Shigeyuki Uchiyama	def.	Andre Nishino	TKO (Punches)	2	2:29

== Deep: clubDeep Hakuba: Monster Challenge 2 ==
Deep: clubDeep Hakuba: Monster Challenge 2 was an event held on August 12, 2006 at Hakuba47 Mountain Sports Park in Hakuba.

=== Results ===
Main Card
Weight class				Method	Round	Time	Notes
	Takaaki Aoki	def.	Jun Fung Sun	TKO (Strikes)	1	1:14
	Hiroki Nagaoka	def.	Teruhiko Kubo	Submission (Rear Naked Choke)	2	3:20
	Ryosuke Kojima	vs.	Yuta Watanabe	Draw	2	5:00
	Misaki Takimoto	vs.	Sakura Nakamura	Draw	2	5:00
	Kenta Okuyama	def.	Kazuhide Terashita	Decision (Unanimous)	2	5:00
	Kei Nanyo	def.	Shingo Matsuda	Decision (Unanimous)	2	5:00
	Keisuke Kuoiwa	def.	Philip Aono	Decision (Majority)	2	5:00
	Yujiro Kakizawa	def.	Kazuki Nomoto	TKO (Punches)	1	2:17
	Isamu Konishi	def.	Naoki Tajima	Submission (Armbar)	1	0:33
	Yuichi Nakamura	def.	Shinichiro Arai	Submission (Armbar)	1	1:41
	Fukuichiro Yamada	vs.	Tetsuya Fukuda	Draw	2	3:00
	Koichi Ishikawa	def.	Takuya Ando	Submission (Armbar)	1	0:26
	Claudio Silva	def.	Tomoyuki Ora	Submission (Armbar)	1	0:22
	Toru Terashima	def.	Kyozo Watanabe	Submission (Armbar)	1	1:41
	Oswald Yukimoto	def.	Ikuo Nasu	Submission (Guillotine Choke)	2	1:56
	Haruo Hasegawa	def.	Moradi Isamigawa	KO (Punch)	1	2:19

== Deep: 26 Impact ==
Deep: 26 Impact was an event held on October 10, 2006 at Korakuen Hall in Tokyo.

=== Results ===
Main Card
Weight class				Method	Round	Time	Notes
	Fabricio Monteiro	def.	Jutaro Nakao	Decision (Unanimous)	3	5:00
	Kazunori Yokota	def.	Michihiro Omigawa	Decision (Majority)	3	5:00
	Flavio Luiz Moura	def.	Daijiro Matsui	Decision (Unanimous)	2	5:00
	Hidehiko Hasegawa	def.	Ken Hamamura	Submission (Rear Naked Choke)	1	3:22
Featherweight	Masakazu Imanari (c)	def.	Takeshi Yamazaki	KO (Upkick)	3	1:49	(Note: For the Deep Featherweight Championship.)
	Takuhiro Kamikozono	def.	Kosuke Umeda	Submission (Heel Hook)	1	0:43
	Sen Nakadai	def.	Noboru Onishi	KO (Flying Knee and Punches)	1	1:57
	Dong Hyun Kim	def.	Kosei Kubota	KO (Knee)	1	2:46
	Hiroshi Nakano	def.	Hirokazu Konno	TKO (Cut)	1	1:55
	Tsuyoshi Kurihara	def.	Mu Jin Na	Submission (Armbar)	2	1:14
	Seigo Mizuguchi	def.	Takanori Kuno	TKO (Punches)	1	0:57
	Yuki Yashima	def.	Jun Ando	Submission (Armbar)	1	1:27
	Katsunori Kikuno	def.	Yutaka Kobayashi	Submission (Rear-Naked Choke)	1	3:26
	Tomoya Miyashita	def.	Kazutaka Omigawa	Submission (Guillotine Choke)	1	4:51
	Yuki Ito	def.	Seigo Inoue	Submission (Rear Naked Choke)	1	0:35

== Deep: clubDeep Toyama: Barbarian Festival 5 ==
Deep: clubDeep Toyama: Barbarian Festival 5 was an event held on November 19, 2006 at Toyama Event Plaza in Toyama.

=== Results ===
Main Card
Weight class				Method	Round	Time	Notes
	Akira Shoji	def.	Carlos Toyota	Decision (Majority)	2	5:00
	Yoshihiro Tomioka	def.	Jun Hyon Kim	TKO (Punches)	1	1:00
	Miku Matsumoto	def.	Seri Saito	Submission (Armbar)	1	3:17
	Hiroshi Umemura	def.	Shinobu Aoyama	TKO (Punches)	2	0:39
	Yuichi Ikari	vs.	Luiz Andrade I	Draw	2	5:00
	Osami Machida	def.	Kokichi Takarada	Decision (Unanimous)	2	5:00
	Claudio Silva	def.	Takeshi Morimoto	TKO (Punches)	1	0:14
	Mamushi Mamushi	def.	Atsushi Wakui	KO (Punch)	2	0:37
	Tamotsu Kitada	def.	Yoshinobu Kawamura	Submission (Triangle Choke)	1	0:38
	Yuya Osugi	def.	Kunihiro Watanabe	KO (Punch)	2	1:20
	Hiroshi Sano	vs.	Jun Osawa	Draw	2	5:00
	Mikimasa Takayama	vs.	Shunsuke Kimura	Draw	2	5:00

== Deep: clubDeep Tokyo: Future King Tournament 2006 ==
Deep: clubDeep Tokyo: Future King Tournament 2006 was an event held on December 9, 2006 at Shinjuku Face in Tokyo.

=== Results ===
Main Card
Weight class				Method	Round	Time	Notes
	Gotoku Onda	vs.	Cristiano Kaminishi	NC (Accidental Soccer Kick)	1	0:42
	Michihiro Omigawa	def.	Takaaki Aoki	Decision (Unanimous)	2	5:00
	Yuta Watanabe	def.	Ryuji Ohori	TKO (Punches)	1	2:18
	Jun Ando	def.	Kosei Kubota	TKO (Punches)	1	1:01
	Masato Shibata	def.	Muscle Hiranuma	TKO (Punches)	2	2:13
	Yutaro Miyamoto	vs.	Hiromu Nagado	Draw	2	5:00
	Kosuke Umeda	def.	Yuki Ito	Decision (Unanimous)	2	5:00
	Tatsuhito Satsuma	def.	Isao Terada	Decision (Majority)	2	5:00
	Minoru Kato	vs.	Mu Jin Na	No Contest	1	2:30
	Sojiro Orui	def.	Yuichiro Abe	TKO (Punches)	1	1:49
	Yasushi Kitazaki	def.	Yoshitomo Watanabe	TKO (Punches)	1	2:00
	Guy Delumeau	def.	Kenta Okuyama	TKO (Injury)	1	0:38
	Tomoya Miyashita	def.	Sofuku Ra	Submission (Rear Naked Choke)	2	1:13
	Toshiaki Kitada	def.	Makoto Kamaya	Submission (Armbar)	1	2:56
	Sojiro Orui	def.	Kenji Ushioda	TKO (Punches)	1	1:30
	Yuichiro Abe	def.	Ryohei Arai	TKO (Doctor's Stoppage)	1	0:29
	Yoshitomo Watanabe	def.	Atsushi Inoue	TKO (Punches)	2	3:05
	Kota Araki	def.	Yosuke Akahiro	Decision (Unanimous)	2	5:00
	Minoru Tavares Tsuchiya	def.	Tomoyuki Yagashita	KO (Punch)	1	2:48
	Guy Delumeau	def.	Yuta Nabekubo	Decision (Unanimous)	2	5:00
	Kenta Okuyama	def.	Marcelo Shigeo Kobayashi	Decision (Unanimous)	2	5:00
	Tomoya Miyashita	def.	Masakazu Takafuji	Submission (Triangle Choke)	1	1:38
	Sofuku Ra	def.	Jin Hirano	TKO (Punches)	1	0:49
	Makoto Kamaya	def.	Masato Machida	TKO (Slam)	1	1:36
	Toshiaki Kitada	def.	Toru Harai	TKO (Punches)	1	1:43
	Kenji Ushioda	def.	Taketoshi Suzuki	TKO (Doctor's Stoppage)	1	0:44
	Sojiro Orui	def.	Hiroshi Masabuchi	Submission (Armbar)	1	2:38
	Ryohei Arai	def.	Masaya Doi	Submission (Armbar)	1	1:35
	Yuichiro Abe	def.	Yukiharu Maejima	TKO (Punches)	2	2:41
	Yoshitomo Watanabe	def.	Yuki Yashima	KO (Punches)	1	4:54
	Atsushi Inoue	def.	Atsuo Hirano	Submission (Triangle Choke)	1	4:52
	Yasushi Kitazaki	def.	Ryotaro Endo	KO (Punches)	1	3:35
	Yuki Saito	def.	Takahisa Oda	Decision (Unanimous)	2	5:00
	Kota Araki	def.	Akira Kitao	TKO (Punches)	1	1:08
	Yosuke Akahiro	def.	TKO (Punches)	1	1:51
	Minoru Tavares Tsuchiya	def.	Yutaka Kobayashi	Decision (Unanimous)	1	5:00
	Tomoyuki Yagashita	def.	Mitsuo Matsuda	TKO (Punches)	1	1:11
	Yuta Nabekubo	def.	Baba Shigeyasu	Decision (Unanimous)	1	5:00
	Guy Delumeau	def.	Atsushi Hyuga	KO (Punch)	1	0:05
	Kenta Okuyama	def.	Tsuguaki Yamazaki	Submission (Heel Hook)	1	3:42
	Masakazu Takafuji	def.	Ichiro Kudo	Decision (Unanimous)	1	5:00
	Tomoya Miyashita	def.	Toshihiko Tomita	Submission (Guillotine Choke)	1	0:56
	Jin Hirano	def.	Satoru Nito	KO (Punch)	1	0:09
	Sofuku Ra	def.	Eiichi Nagaya	TKO (Punches)	1	3:31
	Masato Machida	def.	Masanori Hirata	Decision (Split)	1	5:00
	Makoto Kamaya	def.	Hideo Matsui	Decision (Unanimous)	1	5:00
	Toshiaki Kitada	def.	Takafumi Otsuka	Decision (Unanimous)	1	5:00
	Toru Harai	def.	Hiroshi Susaki	Decision (Unanimous)	1	5:00

== Deep: 27 Impact ==
Deep: 27 Impact was an event held on December 20, 2006 at Korakuen Hall in Tokyo.

=== Results ===
Main Card
Weight class				Method	Round	Time	Notes
	Kazunori Yokota	def.	Yoshihiro Tomioka	Decision (Majority)	2	5:00
	Ryuta Sakurai	def.	Geovani Pereira	Submission (Kimura)	1	0:57
	Fabricio Monteiro	def.	Kiuma Kunioku	Submission (Rear-Naked Choke)	1	4:41
	Delson Heleno	def.	Eiji Ishikawa	Decision (Majority)	2	5:00
	Satoko Shinashi	def.	Tae Kyung Kim	Submission (Armbar)	1	4:16
	Dae Won Kim	def.	Yuya Shirai	KO (Punch)	1	3:31
	Dong Hyun Kim	def.	Jun Ando	KO (Punch)	2	0:44
	In Seok Kim	def.	Hirokazu Konno	Decision (Unanimous)	2	5:00
	Minoru Kato	def.	Seigo Mizuguchi	KO (Head Kick)	1	2:00
	Katsunori Kikuno	def.	Hiroki Nagaoka	Decision (Majority)	2	5:00
	Takuhiro Kamikozono	def.	Hiroshi Nakano	Decision (Majority)	2	5:00
	Motoyuki Takinishi	def.	Hirotaka Miyakawa	Submission (Armbar)	2	4:46
	Toshiaki Kitada	def.	Tomoya Miyashita	Decision (Split)	2	5:00
	Guy Delumeau	def.	Minoru Tavares Tsuchiya	TKO (Punches)	2	3:58

== See also ==
- List of Deep champions
- List of Deep events
