= Ryuichi Murata =

Japanese judoka and mixed martial arts fighter

Ryuichi Murata 村田龍一
- Born: August 27, 1976 (age 50); Saitama, Saitama, Japan
- Nationality: Japanese
- Height: 5 ft 10 in (1.78 m)
- Weight: 191 lb (87 kg; 13.6 st)
- Division: Middleweight; Light Heavyweight; Heavyweight
- Style: MMA, Judo
- Stance: Orthodox
- Fighting out of: Tokyo, Japan
- Team: DEEP Impact Training Facility; Takada Dojo

Mixed martial arts record
- Total: 12
- Wins: 8
- By knockout: 4
- By submission: 2
- By decision: 2
- Losses: 3
- By knockout: 1
- By submission: 1
- By decision: 1
- Draws: 1

Other information
- Mixed martial arts record from Sherdog
- Judo career
- Weight class: ‍–‍78 kg, ‍–‍81 kg
Medal record
Men's judo
Representing Japan
World Juniors Championships
Silver medal – second place	1996 Porto	‍–‍78 kg
East Asian Games
Bronze medal – third place	2001 Osaka	‍–‍81 kg

Profile at external judo databases
- JudoInside.com: 2915

Ryuichi Murata (Japanese: 村田 龍一, Murata Ryūichi; born August 27, 1976) is a Japanese judoka and mixed martial artist. He was a world-class judo competitor with 5 top-3 Judo World Cup tournament finishes and has won multiple silver and bronze medals at world and national judo competitions. Most recently, he's competed in MMA and currently has an MMA record of 8 wins, 3 losses and 1 draw. He won the Spirit MC Heavyweight Grand Prix tournament in 2007.

== Judo career ==
Murata has achieved good success as a judoka. He was second at the world junior championships in 1996. In Japanese national tournaments he has been second once (2000) and third twice (1998, 2001). At World Cup events he won in Tbilisi (2003) and Budapest (2001), finished second at Leonding, Austria (1997), and third in Paris (2000).

== Mixed martial arts career ==
Ryuichi Murata made his MMA debut on Pride Fighting Championships Bushido 8 card in 2005. He lost the fight against Kazuki Okubo due to submission. In a post fight interview, Murata stated that he didn't have enough experience to fight well in MMA and didn't feel like he was "able to show much at all" of what he wanted to achieve.

Murata went on to fight on a number of cards with the Deep and Spirit MC MMA promotions. In 2007, he participated in Spirit MC's Heavyweight GP tournament. In the first round he knocked out Dong Woo Shin. He later submitted ChunGil Myung Chun with an armbar to move to the tournament finals. In the finals he earned a technical knockout against Jung Gyu Choi to become Spirit MC's Heavyweight GP Champion.

== Judo tournaments ==
Date	Tournament	Place	Weight class
February 2, 2003	A-Tournament Tbilisi	1st	Half-middleweight (81 kg)
January 26, 2003	Super A-Tournament Moscow	2nd	Half-middleweight (81 kg)
January 11, 2003	Jigoro Kano Cup Tokyo	3rd	Half-middleweight (81 kg)
May 25, 2001	East Asian Games Osaka	3rd	Half-middleweight (81 kg)
April 29, 2001	Japan Judo Championships	3rd	Half-middleweight (81 kg)
March 3, 2001	A-Tournament Budapest Bank Cup	1st	Half-middleweight (81 kg)
April 2, 2000	Japan Judo Championships	2nd	Half-middleweight (81 kg)
February 12, 2000	Tournoi de Paris	3rd	Half-middleweight (81 kg)
April 5, 1998	Japan National Championships Fukuoka	3rd	Half-middleweight (81 kg)
February 16, 1997	ASKO World Tournament Leonding	2nd	Half-Heavyweight (78 kg)
October 5, 1996	World Junior Championships	2nd	Half-Heavyweight (78 kg)

== Mixed martial arts record ==
Professional record breakdown
12 matches	8 wins	3 losses
By knockout	4	1
By submission	2	1
By decision	2	1
Draws	1	

Res.	Record	Opponent	Method	Event	Date	Round	Time	Location	Notes
Loss	8-3-1	Jae Young Kim	KO (punches and knees)	Spirit MC 17	June 29, 2008	1	0:33	Seoul, South Korea	
Win	8-2-1	Seung Bae Whi	Decision (unanimous)	Spirit MC 16	April 27, 2008	3	5:00	Seoul, South Korea	
Win	7-2-1	Ho Jin Kim	Submission (armbar)	Deep: Protect Impact 2007	December 22, 2007	1	3:38	Osaka, Japan	
Win	6-2-1	Jung Gyu Choi	TKO (punches)	Spirit MC 13	October 14, 2007	3	3:34	Seoul, South Korea	Heavyweight Grand Prix final
Win	5-2-1	Gil Myung Chun	Submission (keylock)	Spirit MC 13	October 14, 2007	1	3:29	Seoul, South Korea	Heavyweight Grand Prix semi-final
Win	4-2-1	Dong Woo Shin	KO (punch)	Spirit MC 12	August 19, 2007	1	2:18	Seoul, South Korea	Heavyweight Grand Prix quarter-final
Draw	3-2-1	Sojiro Orui	Draw	Deep: 31 Impact	August 5, 2007	2	5:00	Tokyo, Japan	
Win	3-2	Gregory Babene	TKO (punches)	Real Rhythm - 5th Stage	November 18, 2006	1	3:36	Osaka, Japan	
Win	2-2	Seiki Ryo	Decision (unanimous)	Deep: clubDeep Nagoya: MB3z Impact, Di Entrare	May 21, 2006	2	5:00	Nagoya	
Loss	1-2	Nick Ring	Decision (unanimous)	Deep: 23 Impact	February 5, 2006	2	5:00	Tokyo, Japan	
Win	1-1	Ryuhei Sato	TKO (punches)	Deep: 21st Impact	October 28, 2005	1	3:51	Tokyo, Japan	
Loss	0-1	Kazuki Okubo	Submission (armbar)	Pride: Bushido 8	July 17, 2005	1	4:29	Nagoya, Aichi, Japan	MMA Debut
