= 2005 in Deep =

Mixed martial arts events

Information
- First date: February 12, 2005
- Last date: December 25, 2005

Events
- Total events: 10

Fights
- Total fights: 148
- Title fights: 2

Chronology
2004 in Deep	2005 in Deep	2006 in Deep

The year 2005 was the fifth year in the history of Deep, a mixed martial arts promotion based in Japan. In 2005 Deep held 10 events beginning with, Deep: 18th Impact.

== Title fights ==
Title fights in 2005
Weight class				Method	Round	Time	Event	Notes
Lightweight	Dokonjonosuke Mishima	def.	Tomomi Iwama	Decision (Unanimous)	3	5:00	Deep: 18th Impact	(Note: For the Deep Lightweight Championship.)
Featherweight	Masakazu Imanari	vs.	Yoshiro Maeda	Draw	3	5:00	Deep: 18th Impact	(Note: For the Deep Featherweight Championship.)

== Events list ==
#	Event title	Date	Arena	Location
36	Deep: Future King Tournament 2005	December 25, 2005	Gold's Gym South Tokyo Annex	Tokyo
35	Deep: 22 Impact	December 2, 2005	Korakuen Hall	Tokyo
34	Deep: clubDeep Toyama: Barbarian Festival 3	October 30, 2005	Toyama Event Plaza	Toyama
33	Deep: 21st Impact	October 28, 2005	Korakuen Hall	Tokyo
32	Deep: 20th Impact	September 3, 2005	Differ Ariake	Tokyo
31	Deep: 19th Impact	July 8, 2005	Korakuen Hall	Tokyo
30	Deep: clubDeep Toyama: Barbarian Festival 2	May 15, 2005	Toyama Event Plaza	Toyama
29	Deep: Hero 1	April 17, 2005	Zepp Nagoya	Nagoya
28	Deep: clubDeep Fukuoka: World Best Festival	April 10, 2005	Murasaki River Event Hall	Fukuoka
27	Deep: 18th Impact	February 12, 2005	Korakuen Hall	Tokyo

== Deep: 18th Impact ==
Deep: 18th Impact was an event held on February 12, 2005, in Tokyo.

=== Results ===
Main Card
Weight class				Method	Round	Time	Notes
	Ryo Chonan	def.	Roan Carneiro	TKO (doctor stoppage)	3	2:15	(Note: Doctor stoppage due to cut.)
Lightweight	Dokonjonosuke Mishima	def.	Tomomi Iwama	Decision (Unanimous)	3	5:00	(Note: For the Deep Lightweight Championship.)
Featherweight	Masakazu Imanari	vs.	Yoshiro Maeda	Draw	3	5:00	(Note: For the Deep Featherweight Championship.)
	Satoko Shinashi	vs.	Mari Kaneko	Draw	2	5:00
	Noriki Miyashita	def.	Jun Ishii	KO (Punches)	1	0:56
	Hiromitsu Miura	def.	Hirohide Fujinuma	Decision (Unanimous)	2	5:00
	Yuya Shirai	def.	Ryuhei Sato	Decision (Unanimous)	2	5:00
	Yuki Inoue	def.	Yuichi Ikari	Decision (Unanimous)	2	5:00
	Kosuke Umeda	def.	Takenori Sato	TKO (Corner Stoppage)	1	0:35
	Nobuhiro Obiya	def.	Yutaro Miyamoto	TKO (Punches)	1	4:48
	Yuichi Ikari	def.	Luiz Andrade I	TKO	2	1:20
	Yuki Inoue	def.	Motomare Takahashi	Technical Submission (Rear Naked Choke)	1	4:13

== Deep: clubDeep Fukuoka: World Best Festival ==
Deep: clubDeep Fukuoka: World Best Festival was an event held on April 10, 2005, in Tokyo.

=== Results ===
Main Card
Weight class				Method	Round	Time	Notes
	Akira Yasumura	def.	Keigo Takamori	KO (Punches)	1	1:14
	Yoshinori Kawakami	vs.	Akihiko Mori	Draw	2	5:00
	Rikomatsu Muho	def.	Jason Jason	Submission (Kimura)	1	0:56
	Hiromitsu Miura	def.	Yoshitaka Ideta	TKO (Punches)	1	0:56
	Tsuyoshi Kurihara	vs.	Yusuke Horimoto	Draw	2	5:00
	Yutaro Miyamoto	def.	Yano Rider	Submission (Heel Hook)	1	3:17
	Bancho Shintaro	def.	Jamal Jamal	KO (Punch)	1	1:37
	Ryuki Ryuki	vs.	Eiji Ogawa	Draw	2	5:00
	Lightning Aso	def.	Seiji Fukuoka]	Submission (Triangle Choke)	2	0:27
	Takuro Nishimura	vs.	Akitoshi Mori	Draw	1	5:00

== Deep: Hero 1 ==
Deep: Hero 1 was an event held on April 17, 2005, in Tokyo.

=== Results ===
Main Card
Weight class				Method	Round	Time	Notes
	Yasuhito Namekawa	def.	Kenji Akiyama	TKO (Punches)	1	3:48
	Ryan Bow	def.	Joao Batista Yoshimura	TKO (Retirement)	2	5:00
	Hiroshi Umemura	vs.	Motoyuki Takinishi	Draw	2	5:00
	Jae-Young Kim	def.	Junpei Hamada	TKO (Punches)	1	1:50
	Atsuhiro Tsuboi	def.	Isamu Sugiuchi	TKO (Punches)	1	3:39
	Naoki Kimura	def.	Tomonori Ohara	TKO (Punches)	1	2:15
	Akihiro Yamasaki	vs.	Ezekiel Zayas	Draw	2	5:00
	Edison Salman Mishio	def.	Kunihiro Watanabe	Decision (Unanimous)	2	5:00
	Ken Hamamura	def.	Tatsuharu Doi	TKO (Punches)	1	1:35
	Yoshihiro Tomioka	def.	Manao Kumagai	TKO (Punches)	2	0:57
	Takenori Sato	def.	Marlon Medeiros	TKO (Punches)	1	4:21
	Hitoyo Kimura	def.	Atsushi Uozumi	Submission (Rear Naked Choke)	1	2:57
	Noritaka Sasamoto	def.	Haremiki Umemoto	TKO (Cut)	1	2:10
	Osami Machida	def.	Takashi Miyazawa	Decision (Unanimous)	2	3:00

== Deep: clubDeep Toyama: Barbarian Festival 2 ==
Deep: clubDeep Toyama: Barbarian Festival 2 was an event held on May 15, 2005, in Tokyo.

=== Results ===
Main Card
Weight class				Method	Round	Time	Notes
	Yoshihiro Tomioka	def.	Naoki Seki	TKO (Punches)	1	3:49
	Takahiro Oba	def.	Junpei Hamada	Decision (Unanimous)	2	5:00
	Hiroshi Umemura	def.	Ryuichi Nozawa	Submission (Rear-Naked Choke)	1	1:34
	Miku Matsumoto	def.	Hikaru Shinohara	Submission (Armbar)	1	1:44
	Shinobu Aoyama	def.	Kenichi Matsuo	Decision (Unanimous)	2	5:00
	Ken Hamamura	def.	Takenori Sato	TKO (Punches)	1	0:21
	Yuichi Ikari	def.	Yasuhiro Kanayama	Decision (Unanimous)	2	5:00
	Soichi Nishida	def.	Masato Shibata	TKO (Punches)	1	0:28
	Kazuhide Terashita	vs.	Masato Ogura	Draw	2	5:00
	Tamotsu Kitada	def.	Toru Ishinaka	Submission (Triangle Choke)	1	4:58
	Takeshi Shinokawa	def.	Hiromi Sagawa	TKO (Punches)	2	0:14
	Joji Kawamata	def.	Hiroyuki Mizuno	TKO (Punches)	1	0:58
	Yasunori Minami	def.	Ryuichi Yamamoto	TKO (Punches)	1	1:02

== Deep: 19th Impact ==
Deep: 19th Impact was an event held on July 8, 2005, in Tokyo.

=== Results ===
Main Card
Weight class				Method	Round	Time	Notes
	Ryuta Sakurai	def.	Yasuhito Namekawa	Submission (Armbar)	1	4:40
	Nobuhiro Obiya	def.	Hidehiko Hasegawa	Decision (Unanimous)	3	5:00
	Hiroki Nagaoka	def.	Takumi Nakayama	Decision (Majority)	2	5:00
	Satoko Shinashi	def.	Mari Kaneko	Decision (Unanimous)	2	5:00
	Hidetada Irie	def.	Rikio Rikio	TKO (Punches)	1	2:41
	Ryuji Ohori	def.	Anthony Netzler	KO (Punches)	2	2:04
	Mitsuyoshi Sato	vs.	Makoto Miyazawa	Draw	2	5:00
	Won Jin Eoh	def.	Tomoyoshi Iwamiya	TKO (Punches)	1	2:31
	Yoshihiro Tomioka	def.	Naoki Matsushita	TKO (Punches)	2	0:33
	Tomonori Taniguchi	vs.	Motomare Takahashi	Draw	2	5:00
	Kazuya Tamura	def.	Haru Yoshino	Submission (Rear Naked Choke)	2	1:37

== Deep: 20th Impact ==
Deep: 20th Impact was an event held on September 3, 2005, in Tokyo.

=== Results ===
Main Card
Weight class				Method	Round	Time	Notes
	Jutaro Nakao	vs.	Won Jin Eoh	Draw	3	5:00
	Seichi Ikemoto	def.	Hidehiko Hasegawa	Decision (Unanimous)	3	5:00
	Tyrone Glover	def.	Din Thomas	Decision (Majority)	3	5:00
	Satoko Shinashi	def.	Noriko Okamoto	Submission (Armbar)	1	0:48
	Takeshi Yamazaki	def.	Yoshihiro Tomioka	Submission (Rear-Naked Choke)	1	4:31
	Kazunori Yokota	def.	Hiroki Nagaoka	Decision (Unanimous)	2	5:00
	Dae Won Kim	def.	Keiichiro Yamamiya	Decision (Unanimous)	2	5:00
	Ken Hamamura	vs.	Takenori Sato	Draw	2	5:00
	Kosuke Umeda	def.	Joao Batista Yoshimura	Decision (Majority)	2	5:00
	Yu Kubo	vs.	Yasuo Nakanishi	Draw	2	5:00

== Deep: 21st Impact ==
Deep: 21st Impact was an event held on October 28, 2005, in Tokyo.

=== Results ===
Main Card
Weight class				Method	Round	Time	Notes
	Yoshiro Maeda	def.	Tomomi Iwama	KO (Head Kick)	1	0:32
	Masakazu Imanari	def.	Fabio Mello	Decision (Unanimous)	3	5:00
	Mike Thomas Brown	def.	Takeshi Yamazaki	Decision (Unanimous)	3	5:00
	Muangfahlek Kiatwichkien	def.	Atsuhiro Tsuboi	KO (Soccer Kick)	2	1:32
	Yasuhito Namekawa	def.	Jong Hyuk Moon	Submission (Forearm Choke)	1	2:33
	Cristiano Kaminishi	def.	Takahiro Oba	TKO (Doctor Stoppage)	1	5:00
	Milton Vieira	def.	Hiroki Nagaoka	Decision (Unanimous)	2	5:00
	Ryuichi Murata	def.	Ryuhei Sato	TKO (Punches)	1	3:51
	Ryuji Ohori	def.	Yuya Shirai	TKO (Cut)	1	4:38
	Hirohide Fujinuma	def.	Wataru Takahashi	TKO (Punches)	1	2:26
	Naoki Seki	def.	Yutaro Miyamoto	Decision (Majority)	2	5:00
	George Tadashi	def.	Kenji Ushioda	Submission (Armbar)	1	1:13
	Yukiharu Maejima	vs.	Jun Ando	Draw	2	5:00
	Masaharu Maruyama	def.	Wataru Yoshikawa	TKO (Doctor Stoppage)	2	1:50
	Hideo Ota	vs.	Andre Nishino	Draw	2	5:00

== Deep: clubDeep Toyama: Barbarian Festival 3 ==
Deep: clubDeep Toyama: Barbarian Festival 3 was an event held on October 30, 2005, in Tokyo.

=== Results ===
Main Card
Weight class				Method	Round	Time	Notes
	Yoshihiro Tomioka	vs.	Kazunori Yokota	Draw	2	5:00
	Miku Matsumoto	def.	Kazumi Kaneko	TKO (Punches)	1	0:18
	Naoki Matsushita	def.	Yuichi Ikari	Decision (Unanimous)	2	5:00
	Tsuyoshi Kurihara	def.	Soichi Nishida	TKO (Punches)	1	0:35
	Minoru Tsuiki	def.	Shinobu Aoyama	Submission (Guillotine Choke)	1	2:11
	Takeshi Matsushita	def.	Motomare Takahashi	Decision (Unanimous)	2	5:00
	Keisuke Oyazi	vs.	Kokichi Takarada	Draw	2	5:00
	Takahiro Kajita	vs.	Kazuhide Terashita	Draw	2	5:00
	Osami Machida	def.	Togi Morita	TKO (Punches)	1	3:06
	Kenichi Hattori	def.	Tamotsu Kitada	Submission (Rear Naked Choke)	1	3:40
	Reisho Shoda	def.	Koji Shimazaki	TKO	2	2:39
	Joji Kawamata	def.	Hitoshi Kobayashi	Submission (Armbar)	2	3:07
	Shinji Ejiri	def.	Yasunori Minami	Submission (Armbar)	1	2:51
	Shun Takahashi	def.	Yosuke Yosuke	TKO (Punches)	1	1:47
	Yoshitomo Watanabe	def.	Haremiki Umemoto	KO (Punch)	2	1:43

== Deep: 22 Impact ==
Deep: 22 Impact was an event held on December 2, 2005, in Tokyo.

=== Results ===
Main Card
Weight class				Method	Round	Time	Notes
	Masakazu Imanari	def.	Yoshiro Maeda	Submission (Toe Hold)	3	1:31
	Nobuhiro Obiya	def.	Milton Vieira	Decision (Unanimous)	3	5:00
	Yasuhito Namekawa	vs.	Jeong Ho Lee	Draw	2	5:00
	Hidehiko Hasegawa	def.	Daisuke Nakamura	Decision (Unanimous)	2	5:00
	Yuki Sasaki	def.	Takanori Kuno	TKO (Punches)	1	2:20
	Takeshi Yamazaki	def.	Takeshi Matsushita	Submission (Armbar)	2	4:44
	Yoshiro Maeda	def.	Muangfahlek Kiatwichkien	KO (Soccer Kick)	1	2:26
	Masakazu Imanari	def.	Mike Thomas Brown	Submission (Kneelock)	2	3:38
	Hirohide Fujinuma	def.	Naoki Seki	KO (Punch)	2	1:40
	Gegard Mousasi	def.	Tsuyoshi Kurihara	KO (Knee)	1	0:10
	Jason Chambers	vs.	Kosuke Umeda	Draw	2	5:00
	Yukio Soma	def.	Shingo Matsuda	Submission (Rear Naked Choke)	1	3:12

== Deep: Future King Tournament 2005 ==
Deep: Future King Tournament 2005 was an event held on December 25, 2005, in Tokyo.

=== Results ===
Main Card
Weight class				Method	Round	Time	Notes
	Tsuneyoshi Kashimura	def.	Hiromu Nagado	KO (Punch)	1	4:15
	Jun Ando	def.	Ryotaro Endo	Submission (Rear Naked Choke)	1	2:00
	Tsuneyoshi Kashimura	def.	Yosuke Notsu	TKO (Punches)	1	1:02
	Hiromu Nagado	def.	Masatake Arai	Decision (Split)	2	5:00
	Jun Ando	def.	Tatsuhiko Nishizaka	TKO (Punches)	2	1:23
	Ryotaro Endo	def.	Yusuke Takahashi	Decision (Unanimous)	2	5:00
	Katsunori Kikuno	def.	Masashi Takeda	KO (Punch)	1	2:30
	Yukinari Tamura	def.	Pedro Akira	TKO (Punches)	1	3:31
	Masashi Takeda	def.	Sojiro Orui	TKO (Punches)	1	3:15
	Katsunori Kikuno	def.	Hitoki Tsuti	TKO (Doctor Stoppage)	1	5:00
	Pedro Akira	def.	Yoshitomo Watanabe	Decision (Split)	2	5:00
	Yukinari Tamura	def.	Yosuke Akahiro	Submission (Rear Naked Choke)	1	2:20
	Sojiro Orui	def.	Hiroki Saito	Submission (Armbar)	1	3:06
	Hitoki Tsuti	def.	Yoshinobu Kawamura	KO (Knee)	1	4:43
	Yosuke Hoshina	def.	Yoshitomo Watanabe	Decision (Unanimous)	2	5:00
	Ayumu Kobayashi	def.	Mitsufumi Matsumoto	Submission (Rear Naked Choke)	1	4:53
	Yoshihiro Koyama	def.	Kenta Okuyama	Decision (Unanimous)	2	5:00
	Ayumu Kobayashi	def.	Kei Nanyo	TKO (Punches)	2	2:02
	Mitsufumi Matsumoto	def.	Takahisa Shinohara	Submission (Armbar)	1	4:52
	Yoshihiro Koyama	def.	Kazunobu Shibata	Submission (Armbar)	2	4:52
	Kenta Okuyama	def.	Junji Komatsu	Submission (Rear Naked Choke)	1	0:43
	Ayumu Kobayashi	def.	Masaomi Saito	TKO (Punches)	1	3:55
	Kei Nanyo	def.	Fujio Yanagawa	Submission (Rear Naked Choke)	1	1:15
	Mitsufumi Matsumoto	def.	Yutaka Kobayashi	Decision (Unanimous)	2	5:00
	Takahisa Shinohara	def.	Mitsuo Matsuda	Submission (Armbar)	1	2:03
	Yoshihiro Koyama	def.	Seigo Inoue	Decision (Unanimous)	2	5:00
	Kazunobu Shibata	def.	Eiji Kani	TKO (Punches)	1	0:47
	Kenta Okuyama	def.	Nobutaka Sato	KO (Punch)	1	0:02
	Shinji Ejiri	def.	Goro Kobayashi	TKO (Punches)	1	2:44
	Motomare Takahashi	def.	Henri Kakiuchi	TKO (Punches)	1	4:15
	Shinji Ejiri	def.	Andre Nishino	Decision (Split)	2	5:00
	Goro Kobayashi	def.	Noriyuki Takeuchi	TKO (Punches)	1	4:26
	Henri Kakiuchi	def.	Toshihiko Tomita	KO (Punch)	1	0:09
	Motomare Takahashi	def.	Kazutaka Omigawa	TKO (Punches)	1	4:26
	Goro Kobayashi	def.	Katsuyoshi Takeishi	Submission (Rear Naked Choke)	1	4:43
	Toshihiko Tomita	def.	Yuhei Horiuchi	Decision (Split)	2	5:00

== See also ==
- Deep
- List of Deep champions
- List of Deep events
