= Miku Matsumoto =

Japanese martial artist

- Born: June 26, 1981 (age 45); Toyama, Toyama, Japan
- Other names: Supernova
- Nationality: Japanese
- Height: 5 ft 3 in (1.60 m)
- Weight: 106 lb (48 kg; 7.6 st)
- Fighting out of: Toyama, Japan
- Team: Club Barbarian
- Years active: 2004-2010

Mixed martial arts record
- Total: 27
- Wins: 23
- By knockout: 3
- By submission: 14
- By decision: 6
- Losses: 4
- By submission: 4

Other information
- Mixed martial arts record from Sherdog

Miku Matsumoto (known in Japan as MIKU) (松本未来, Matsumoto Miku), born June 26, 1981, is a female Japanese mixed martial artist. She retired as the DEEP Women's Lightweight (106-Pound) Champion in 2010.

Growing up, Matsumoto studied piano and penmanship and was not interested in sports. She began training in MMA as a part-time job to kill time and save money after studying overseas but went on to become one of the most successful female mixed martial artists in the world.

On February 28, 2010 at DEEP: 46th Impact, Matsumoto confirmed weeks of speculation by announcing that she would be retiring from mixed martial arts. She officially retired following an exhibition match with Megumi Fujii at DEEP: 47th Impact on April 17, 2010.

== Mixed martial arts career ==
Matsumoto debuted in mixed martial arts for the Greatest Common Multiple promotion at Cross Section 2 on September 4, 2004. She defeated Eri Ishiyama by Unanimous Decision.

Matsumoto won nine of her next eleven fights, losing only to Misaki Takimoto on October 24, 2004 and again on December 17, 2005. She was defeated by Carina Damm in a controversial bout at MARS Attack 1 on July 21, 2006, but avenged the loss in a rematch one month later on August 26.

Matsumoto became the number one contender in DEEP after back-to-back wins over Seo Hee Ham and Misaki Takimoto in their third meeting.

She captured the DEEP Women's Lightweight Championship by defeating Hisae Watanabe at DEEP: 31st Impact on August 5, 2007.

On June 28, 2009, Matsumoto avenged the final unavenged loss on her record by defeating Lisa Ellis, who had previously defeated Matsumoto in September 2006 by submitting her with an armlock in the third round. Matsumoto counts the rematch with Ellis as the most influential fight of her career.

Matsumoto defeated veteran Japanese striker "Windy" Tomomi Sunaba at DEEP: 44th Impact on October 10. Both before and after the fight, Matsumoto stated that she would like to challenge Megumi Fujii in the future.

== Retirement ==
On February 28, 2010, Matsumoto announced her retirement from mixed martial arts in front of a shocked audience at DEEP: 46th Impact in Tokyo, Japan.

In a blog entry on March 2, 2010, Matsumoto stated that she had become detached from MMA and no longer had the ability to continue serious training or perform as a professional fighter. She further stated that she had no regrets about her decision to retire and does not plan to remain involved with MMA training or coaching in the near future.

Matsumoto engaged in a five-minute exhibition match with friend and fellow fighter Megumi Fujii at DEEP: 47th Impact on April 17, 2010. A retirement ceremony was held for Matsumoto following the match.

At the time of her retirement, Matsumoto was the #3-ranked pound-for-pound female MMA fighter in the world by MMARising.com and the #2-ranked female flyweight according to the Unified Women's MMA Rankings.

== Mixed martial arts record ==
Professional record breakdown
27 matches	23 wins	4 losses
By knockout	3	0
By submission	14	4
By decision	6	0

Res.	Record	Opponent	Method	Event	Date	Round	Time	Location	Notes
Win	23-4	Tomomi Sunaba	Decision (unanimous)	Deep: 44 Impact	October 10, 2009	2	5:00	Tokyo, Japan	
Win	22-4	Lisa Ellis	Submission (armbar)	Deep: Toyama Impact	June 28, 2009	3	2:53	Toyama, Japan	Defended Deep Women's Lightweight Title
Win	21-4	Nicdali Rivera-Calanoc	TKO (knees to the body)	Deep: 41 Impact	April 16, 2009	1	0:21	Tokyo, Japan	
Win	20-4	Hikaru Shinohara	Submission (armbar)	Deep: Protect Impact 2008	December 22, 2008	1	1:00	Tokyo, Japan	
Win	19-4	Misaki Takimoto	TKO (kicks to the body)	Deep: 37 Impact	August 17, 2008	2	4:40	Tokyo, Japan	Defended Deep Women's Lightweight Title
Win	18-4	Waenthong Sakrungreong	Technical Submission (armbar)	Deep: Protect Impact 2007	December 22, 2007	1	0:43	Osaka, Japan	
Win	17-4	Yukiko Seki	Submission (kimura)	Deep: clubDeep Kanazawa	December 9, 2007	1	1:07	Ishikawa, Japan	
Win	16-4	Masako Yoshida	Submission (armbar)	Deep: clubDeep Sendai	October 28, 2007	1	3:23	Miyagi, Japan	
Win	15-4	Hisae Watanabe	Decision (majority)	Deep: 31 Impact	August 5, 2007	3	5:00	Tokyo, Japan	Won Deep Women's Lightweight Title
Win	14-4	Misaki Takimoto	Submission (armbar)	Deep: Oyaji Deep	June 16, 2007	1	4:32	Tokyo, Japan	
Win	13-4	Seo Hee Ham	Submission (triangle choke)	Deep: clubDeep Toyama: Barbarian Festival 6	May 13, 2007	2	3:44	Toyama, Japan	
Win	12-4	Seri Saito	Submission (armbar)	Deep: clubDeep Toyama: Barbarian Festival 5	November 19, 2006	1	3:17	Toyama, Japan	
Loss	11-4	Lisa Ellis	Submission (scarf hold armlock)	Smackgirl - Women Hold Their Ground	September 15, 2006	1	3:04	Tokyo, Japan	
Win	11-3	Carina Damm	Decision (unanimous)	MARS 4 - New Deal	August 26, 2006	2	5:00	Tokyo, Japan	
Loss	10-3	Carina Damm	Technical Submission (armbar)	MARS - MARS Attack 1	July 21, 2006	2	1:17	Tokyo, Japan	
Win	10-2	Yayoi Okubo	Submission (armbar)	Deep: clubDeep Toyama: Barbarian Festival 4	June 18, 2006	1	0:53	Toyama, Japan	
Win	9-2	Yuki Furudate	Submission (rear naked choke)	Deep: 23 Impact	February 5, 2006	1	2:52	Tokyo, Japan	
Loss	8-2	Misaki Takimoto	Submission (armbar)	G-Shooto: G-Shooto 03	December 17, 2005	1	3:08	Tokyo, Japan	
Win	8-1	Kazumi Kaneko	TKO (punches)	Deep: clubDeep Toyama: Barbarian Festival 3	October 30, 2005	1	0:18	Toyama, Japan	
Win	7-1	Akiko Inoue	Decision (unanimous)	G-Shooto: Plus03	September 16, 2005	2	5:00	Tokyo, Japan	
Win	6-1	Ikuma Shibata	Submission (armbar)	W-FACE	July 29, 2005	1	0:33	Tokyo, Japan	
Win	5-1	Hikaru Shinohara	Submission (armbar)	Deep: clubDeep Toyama: Barbarian Festival 2	May 15, 2005	1	1:44	Toyama, Japan	
Win	4-1	Izumi Noguchi	Decision (unanimous)	G-Shooto: G-Shooto 02	March 12, 2005	2	5:00	Tokyo, Japan	
Win	3-1	Yoko Hattori	Submission (armbar)	HEAT 1	February 6, 2005	1	2:38	Aichi, Japan	
Win	2-1	Chihiro Takahashi	Submission (armbar)	G-Shooto: G-Shooto 01	November 26, 2004	1	3:48	Tokyo, Japan	
Loss	1-1	Misaki Takimoto	Submission (armbar)	Deep: clubDeep Toyama: Barbarian Festival 1	October 24, 2004	1	4:45	Toyama, Japan	
Win	1-0	Eri Ishiyama	Decision (unanimous)	Cage Force - Cross Section 2	September 4, 2004	2	5:00	Tokyo, Japan	

== Championships ==
- DEEP Women's Lightweight Champion

== See also ==
- List of female mixed martial artists
