= Yuya Shirai =

Japanese mixed martial artist

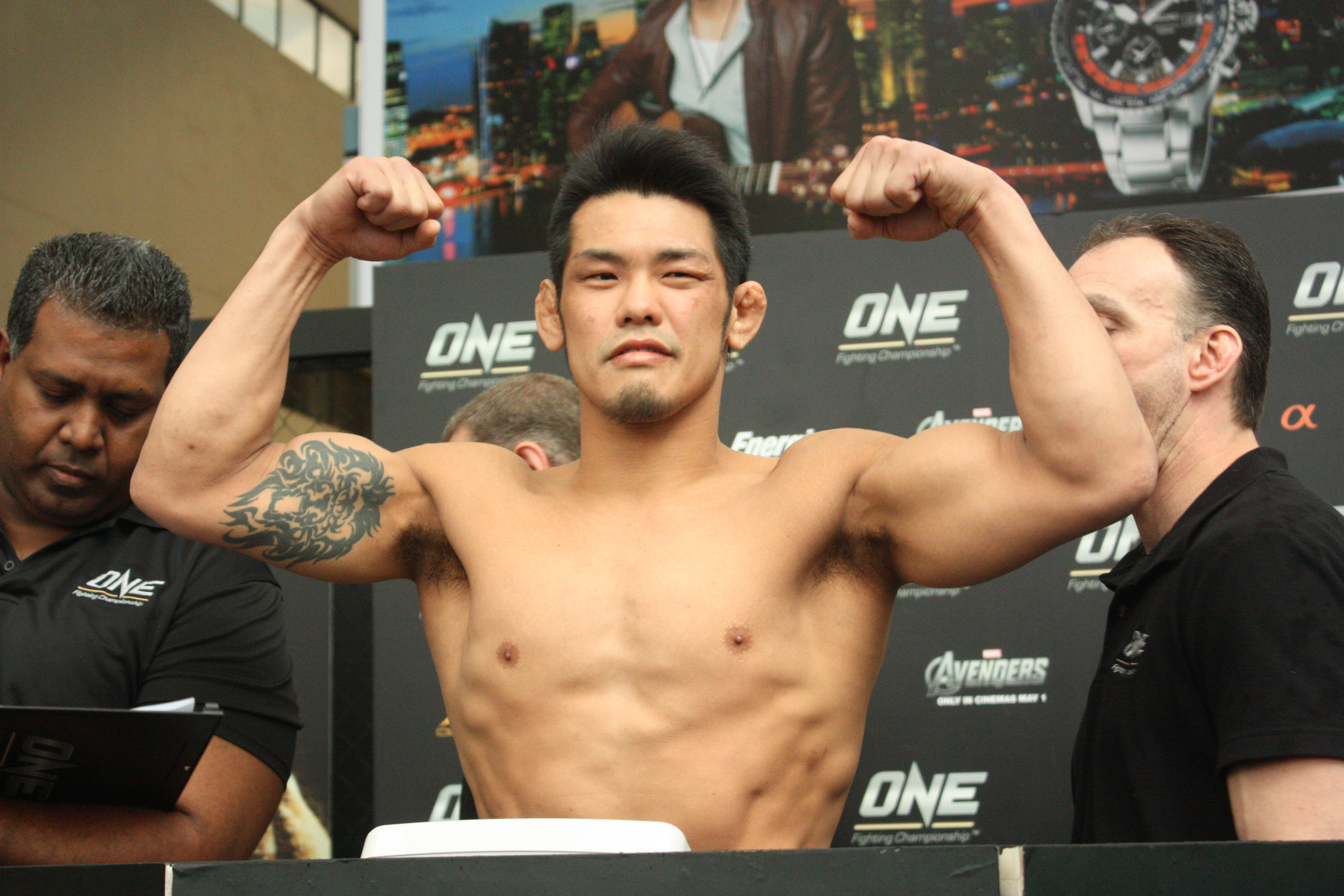
- Born: April 2, 1980 (age 46); Tokyo, Japan
- Height: 5 ft 8 in (1.73 m)
- Weight: 170 lb (77 kg; 12 st)
- Team: Team M.A.D. Tribe Tokyo MMA
- Rank: Black belt in Judo
- Years active: 2003–present

Mixed martial arts record
- Total: 42
- Wins: 26
- By knockout: 4
- By submission: 6
- By decision: 16
- Losses: 14
- By knockout: 5
- By submission: 1
- By decision: 8
- Draws: 2

Other information
- Mixed martial arts record from Sherdog

Yuya Shirai (born April 2, 1980) is a Japanese professional mixed martial artist currently competing in the Welterweight division. A professional competitor since 2003, Shirai has fought for ONE FC, DEEP, BAMMA, Glory World Series, M-1 Global, Pancrase, DREAM, and is a former DEEP Welterweight Champion.

== Mixed martial arts career ==
=== Background ===
Shirai comes from a judo background and holds a black belt in the discipline. On June 8, 2003, he won the Japanese National Sambo Championship in the under 90 kilograms weight class.

=== Early career ===
Shirai made his debut in mixed martial arts on September 15, 2003. He is currently signed with DEEP in the Welterweight division, and won the DEEP Welterweight Championship in January 2010 by defeating Seichi Ikemoto.

He also took part in the DREAM Welterweight Grand Prix 2009, losing to Jason High by rear naked-choke in the first round. He then beat Che Mills at Hidehiko Yoshida's farewall event ASTRA.

On February 26, 2011, he faced Paul Daley at BAMMA 5: Daley vs. Shirai in Manchester, England. Shirai lost the fight via KO in the first round.

It was announced on 14 June 2011 that he would be facing Murilo Bustamante at a Clube da Luta event in Rio de Janeiro, Brazil on the 20th July. However Bustamante later pulled out of the bout due to injury and was replaced by Delson Heleno in what will now be a 180-pound catchweight contest.

He will face Tommy Depret at Glory 2: Brussels on October 6, 2012, in Brussels, Belgium.

== Championships and accomplishments ==
- DEEP Welterweight Championship (One time)

== Mixed martial arts record ==
Professional record breakdown
42 matches	26 wins	14 losses
By knockout	4	5
By submission	6	1
By decision	16	8
Draws	2	

Res.	Record	Opponent	Method	Event	Date	Round	Time	Location	Notes
Win	26–14–2	Ikuhisa Minowa	Decision (unanimous)	DEEP: 75 Impact	February 27, 2016	3	5:00	Tokyo, Japan	
Win	25–14–2	Hiroshi Takahashi	Submission (guillotine choke)	Tribe Tokyo Fight: TTF Challenge 05	September 23, 2015	2	1:36	Tokyo, Japan	
Loss	24–14–2	Yuta Watanabe	TKO (punches)	DEEP: 70 Impact	December 21, 2014	1	2:34	Tokyo, Japan	For DEEP Welterweight Championship.
Win	24–13–2	Yuki Okano	Decision (split)	DEEP: Cage Impact 2014	July 21, 2014	3	5:00	Tokyo, Japan	
Draw	23–13–2	Akihiro Murayama	Draw (majority)	DEEP: Tribe Tokyo Fight	October 20, 2013	3	5:00	Tokyo, Japan	
Loss	23–13–1	Dan Hornbuckle	Decision (unanimous)	DEEP: 62 Impact	April 26, 2013	3	5:00	Tokyo, Japan	Lost DEEP Welterweight Championship.
Win	23–12–1	Yuki Okano	Decision (unanimous)	DEEP: 61 Impact	February 16, 2013	2	5:00	Tokyo, Japan	
Loss	22–12–1	Tommy Depret	TKO (punches)	Glory World Series: Glory 2: Brussels	October 6, 2012	3	N/A	Brussels, Belgium	
Loss	22–11–1	Fabricio Monteiro	Decision (unanimous)	ONE Fighting Championship: War of the Lions	March 31, 2012	3	5:00	Kallang, Singapore	
Win	22–10–1	Taisuke Okuno	Decision (unanimous)	Deep: 56 Impact	December 17, 2011	3	5:00	Tokyo, Japan	Defended DEEP Welterweight Championship.
Win	21–10–1	Yoshitomo Watanabe	Decision (unanimous)	Deep: Cage Impact 2011 in Tokyo, 2nd Round	October 29, 2011	2	5:00	Tokyo, Japan	
Loss	20–10–1	Delson Heleno	Decision (majority)	Clube da Luta	July 20, 2011	3	5:00	Rio de Janeiro, Brazil	Catchweight (180 lb) bout.
Loss	20–9–1	Paul Daley	KO (punches)	BAMMA 5	February 26, 2011	1	1:46	Manchester, England	Originally for the BAMMA Welterweight Championship but Daley weighed in 0.4 lb over the 170-pound limit so it was changed to a non-title fight.
Win	20–8–1	Shigetoshi Iwase	Decision (unanimous)	DEEP: 50th Impact	October 24, 2010	2	5:00	Tokyo, Japan	Defended DEEP Welterweight Championship.
Win	19–8–1	Che Mills	Submission (armbar)	Astra: Yoshida's Farewell	April 25, 2010	1	3:59	Tokyo, Japan	
Win	18–8–1	Seichi Ikemoto	Decision (unanimous)	DEEP: 45 Impact	January 24, 2010	3	5:00	Osaka, Japan	Won DEEP Welterweight Championship.
Win	17–8–1	Shigetoshi Iwase	Decision (unanimous)	Deep: 44 Impact	October 10, 2009	2	5:00	Tokyo, Japan	
Win	16–8–1	Gael Grimaud	TKO (punches)	M-1 Challenge 18: Netherlands Day One	August 15, 2009	1	4:16	Hilversum, Netherlands	
Loss	15–8–1	Jason High	Submission (rear-naked choke)	DREAM 8	April 5, 2009	1	0:59	Nagoya, Japan	DREAM Welterweight Grand Prix Opening Round.
Win	15–7–1	Yoon Young Kim	Submission (rear-naked choke)	Deep: clubDeep Tokyo: Protect Cup Final	March 14, 2009	3	2:59	Tokyo, Japan	
Win	14–7–1	Yuichi Nakanishi	Decision (unanimous)	Deep: 39 Impact	December 10, 2008	3	5:00	Tokyo, Japan	
Win	13–7–1	Rafael Rodriguez	Submission (kimura)	M-1 Challenge 8: USA	October 29, 2008	1	2:16	Kansas City, Missouri, United States	
Loss	12–7–1	Jordan Radev	Decision (majority)	M-1 Challenge 6: Korea	August 29, 2008	2	5:00	Korea	
Loss	12–6–1	Riki Fukuda	Decision (split)	Deep: 35 Impact	May 19, 2008	2	5:00	Tokyo, Japan	
Win	12–5–1	Sojiro Orui	Decision (unanimous)	Deep: 34 Impact	February 22, 2008	3	5:00	Tokyo, Japan	
Win	11–5–1	Kozo Urita	Submission (armbar)	Deep: 31 Impact	August 5, 2007	1	2:42	Tokyo, Japan	
Win	10–5–1	Eiji Ishikawa	Decision (majority)	Deep: Deep in Yamagata	June 24, 2007	3	5:00	Yamagata, Japan	
Loss	9–5–1	Dae Won Kim	KO (punch)	DEEP: 27 Impact	December 20, 2006	1	3:31	Tokyo, Japan	
Win	9–4–1	Jae Suk Lim	KO (punch)	Spirit MC 9: Welterweight GP Opening	October 8, 2006	1	4:17	Seoul, South Korea	
Win	8–4–1	Masataka Chinushi	Submission (guillotine choke)	Real Rhythm: 4th Stage	July 30, 2006	1	2:31	Osaka, Japan	
Loss	7–4–1	Joey Villaseñor	Decision (unanimous)	DEEP: 24 Impact	April 11, 2006	2	5:00	Tokyo, Japan	
Win	7–3–1	Tomoyoshi Iwamiya	Decision (unanimous)	DEEP: 23 Impact	February 5, 2006	2	5:00	Tokyo, Japan	
Loss	6–3–1	Ryuji Ohori	TKO (cut)	DEEP: 21st Impact	October 28, 2005	1	4:38	Tokyo, Japan	
Loss	6–2–1	Daisuke Watanabe	Decision (majority)	Pancrase: Spiral 4	May 1, 2005	2	5:00	Yokohama, Japan	
Win	6–1–1	Ryuhei Sato	Decision (unanimous)	DEEP: 18th Impact	February 12, 2005	2	5:00	Tokyo, Japan	
Loss	5–1–1	Yuki Sasaki	Decision (unanimous)	Pancrase: Brave 11	November 26, 2004	3	5:00	Tokyo, Japan	
Win	5–0–1	Mitsuyoshi Sato	Decision (majority)	Pancrase: Brave 8	September 24, 2004	2	5:00	Tokyo, Japan	
Win	4–0–1	Takahiro Nagata	TKO (punches)	DEEP: 15th Impact	July 3, 2004	1	4:21	Tokyo, Japan	
Win	3–0–1	Takashi Ishino	Decision (majority)	GCM: Demolition 040408	April 8, 2004	2	5:00	Tokyo, Japan	
Win	2–0–1	Shunichi Akimoto	Decision (unanimous)	GCM: Demolition 040118	January 18, 2004	2	5:00	Japan	
Draw	1–0–1	Yasuhiro Kirita	Draw	Pancrase: Hybrid 10	November 30, 2003	2	5:00	Tokyo, Japan	
Win	1–0	Toshimitsu Kai	TKO (punches)	DEEP: 12th Impact	September 15, 2003	2	3:48	Tokyo, Japan	

== See also ==
- List of current mixed martial arts champions
- List of male mixed martial artists
