= Kim Jong-man =

South Korean martial artist

Kim Jong-Man (Korean: 김종만)
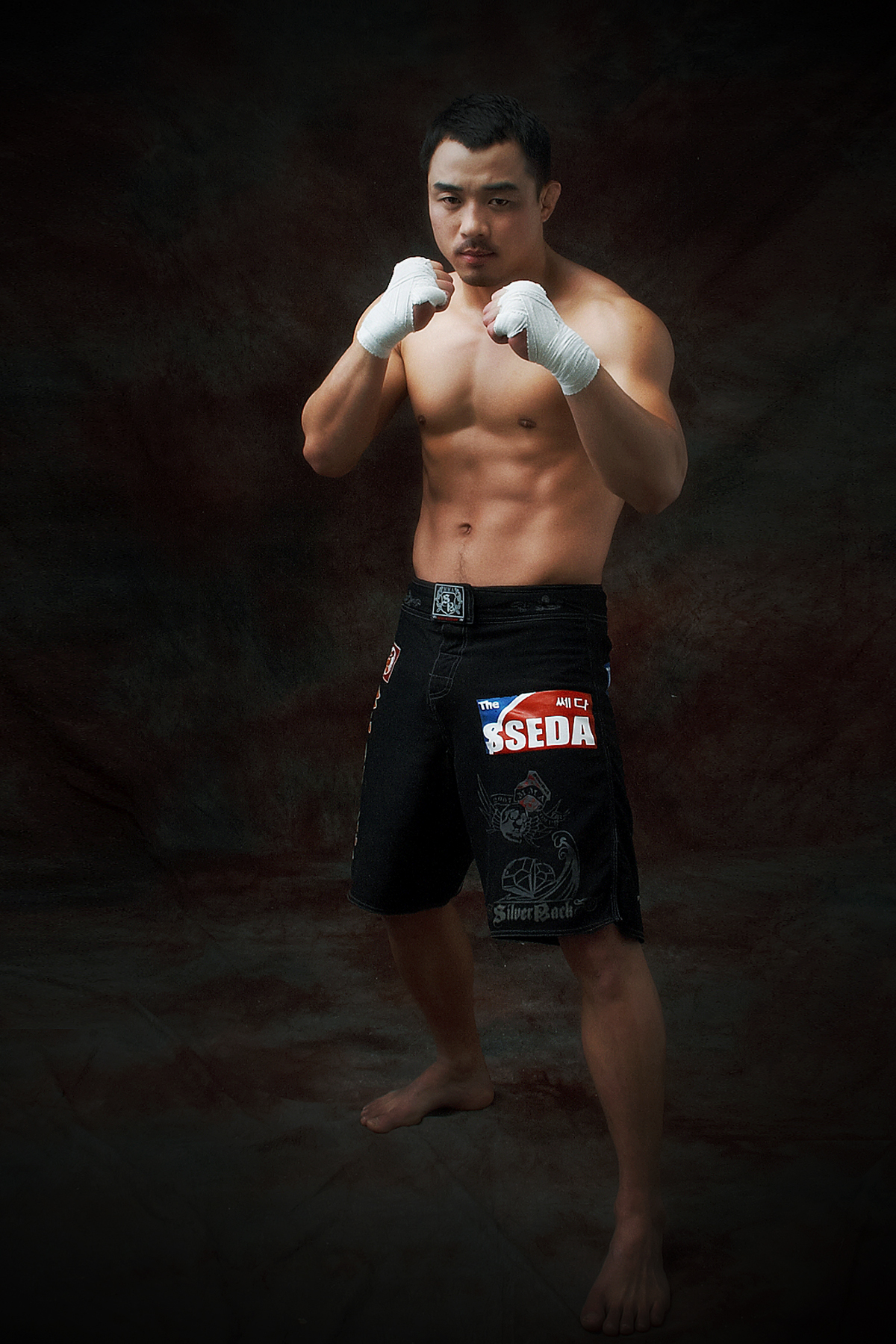
- Martial Combat 2010 Champion Kim Jong Man
- Born: March 3, 1978 (age 48); Seoul, South Korea
- Other names: Special Force
- Nationality: South Korean
- Height: 5 ft 7 in (1.70 m)
- Weight: 145 lb (66 kg; 10.4 st)
- Division: Welterweight; Lightweight; Featherweight; Bantamweight
- Style: Boxing, Judo
- Team: Kim Jong-Man Gym
- Years active: 2003–present

Mixed martial arts record
- Total: 38
- Wins: 23
- By knockout: 5
- By submission: 14
- By decision: 4
- Losses: 11
- By knockout: 1
- By submission: 4
- By decision: 6
- Draws: 3
- No contests: 1

Other information
- Mixed martial arts record from Sherdog
- Last updated on: December 29, 2009

Kim Jong-Man (born March 3, 1978), often anglicised to Jong-Man Kim, is a South Korean mixed martial artist who currently competes in the Featherweight division. While Kim has mostly fought in South Korea, he has also appeared in many Japanese promotions including, the Sengoku Raiden Championships, DEEP, Shooto, K-1 Hero's, and Russia's M-1 Global. He last fought at TOP FC - Original against Seung Hwa-Han.

Kim is a member of Korea's Special Forces, from which he earned his nickname "Special Force."

== Mixed martial arts record ==
Professional record breakdown
38 matches	23 wins	11 losses
By knockout	5	1
By submission	14	4
By decision	4	6
Draws	3	
No contests	1	

Res.	Record	Opponent	Method	Event	Date	Round	Time	Location	Notes
Win	23–11–3 (1)	Seung Hwa-Han	KO (punch)	TOP FC - Original	June 29, 2013	2	N/A	Seoul, South Korea	
Win	22–11–3 (1)	Aaron Steele	TKO (punches)	MC - Martial Combat 3	June 16, 2010	5	4:25	Sentosa, Singapore	
Loss	21–11–3 (1)	Hideo Tokoro	Decision (unanimous)	Dynamite!! The Power of Courage 2009	December 31, 2009	3	5:00	Saitama, Japan	
Loss	21–10–3 (1)	Hiroshi Nakamura	Decision (unanimous)	FMC 1 - Korea vs. Japan	August 16, 2009	3	5:00	Seoul, South Korea	
Loss	21–9–3 (1)	Masanori Kanehara	Decision (unanimous)	World Victory Road Presents: Sengoku 7	March 20, 2009	3	5:00	Tokyo, Japan	Sengoku Featherweight Grandprix Opening Round
Draw	21–8–3 (1)	Daiki Hata	Draw (unanimous)	Deep: 37 Impact	August 17, 2008	3	5:00	Tokyo, Japan	
Loss	21–8–2 (1)	Niko Puhakka	Submission (triangle choke)	M-1 Challenge 2: Russia	April 3, 2008	1	N/A	St. Petersburg, Russia	
Loss	21–7–2 (1)	Tomohiko Hori	Decision (majority)	The Khan 1	March 30, 2008	3	5:00	Seoul, South Korea	
Loss	21–6–2 (1)	Akiyo Nishiura	KO (punches)	GCM - Cage Force EX Eastern Bound	February 11, 2008	1	2:13	Tokyo, Japan	
Draw	21–5–2 (1)	Yoshiro Maeda	Draw	Deep: Protect Impact 2007	December 22, 2007	3	5:00	Osaka, Japan	
Win	21–5–1 (1)	Hatsu Hioki	Decision (split)	Shooto: Gig Central 13	October 8, 2007	3	5:00	Nagoya, Japan	
Loss	20–5–1 (1)	Masakazu Imanari	Submission (armbar)	Deep: 31 Impact	August 5, 2007	1	3:28	Tokyo, Japan	For Deep Featherweight Title
Draw	20–4–1 (1)	Yuji Hoshino	Draw	GCM Cage Force 3	June 9, 2007	2	5:00	Tokyo, Japan	
Loss	20–4 (1)	Do Hyung Kim	Decision (unanimous)	NF Neo Fight 11	April 14, 2007	2	5:00	Seoul, South Korea	
Win	20–3 (1)	Tae Hyun Bang	Decision (unanimous)	NF Neo Fight 11	April 14, 2007	2	5:00	Seoul, South Korea	
Win	19–3 (1)	Hee Won Kim	Submission (armbar)	NF Neo Fight 11	April 14, 2007	1	0:55	Seoul, South Korea	
NC	18–3 (1)	Kevin Roddy	No Contest	World Best Fighter USA vs. Asia	February 3, 2007	1	4:57	Atlantic City, New Jersey, United States	
Win	18–3	Atsushi Yamamoto	TKO (punches)	Hero's 2005 in Seoul	November 5, 2005	2	4:25	Seoul, South Korea	Bantamweight debut.
Loss	17–3	Yong Jae Jun	Decision (unanimous)	G5 - Yungjin Pharm Middleweight Tournament Quarterfinals	December 6, 2004	3	5:00	Seoul, South Korea	
Win	17–2	Jung Hwan Jung	Submission (armbar)	G5 - Yungjin Pharm Middleweight Tournament Second Round	November 24, 2004	1	1:40	Seoul, South Korea	
Win	16–2	Hae Won Kim	Submission (armbar)	G5 Gimme Five	October 27, 2004	1	2:24	Seoul, South Korea	
Win	15–2	Seong Hyun Ko	TKO (punches)	G5 Gimme Five	October 16, 2004	1	1:58	Seoul, South Korea	
Loss	14–2	Lim Jae-Suk	Submission (armbar)	G5 - Motorola Middleweight Tournament Finals	September 13, 2004	1	0:41	Seoul, South Korea	
Win	14–1	Yong Hyun Park	Submission (heel hook)	G5 - Motorola Middleweight Tournament Finals	September 13, 2004	1	2:57	Seoul, South Korea	
Win	13–1	Sang Yong Kim	Submission (heel hook)	G5 - Motorola Middleweight Tournament Quarterfinals	September 8, 2004	2	3:57	Seoul, South Korea	
Win	12–1	Hyo Sik Hong	Decision (unanimous)	G5 - Motorola Middleweight Tournament Second Round	September 1, 2004	3	5:00	Seoul, South Korea	
Win	11–1	Jong Man Kim	Decision (unanimous)	G5 - Motorola Middleweight Tournament Opening Round	August 23, 2004	3	5:00	Seoul, South Korea	
Win	10–1	Jin Woong Choi	Submission (armbar)	G5 Gimme Five	August 12, 2004	2	2:11	Seoul, South Korea	
Win	9–1	Gi Han Kim	Submission (armbar)	G5 Gimme Five	August 3, 2004	1	3:04	Seoul, South Korea	
Win	8–1	Dae Yeol Cho	Submission (guillotine choke)	G5 Gimme Five	July 31, 2004	2	2:26	Seoul, South Korea	
Win	7–1	Ja Wook Kim	Submission (guillotine choke)	G5 Gimme Five	July 17, 2004	2	3:19	Seoul, South Korea	
Win	6–1	Keon Song	TKO (punches)	G5 Gimme Five	July 10, 2004	1	1:58	Seoul, South Korea	
Win	5–1	Nam Kim	Submission (guillotine choke)	G5 Gimme Five	June 11, 2004	2	1:51	Seoul, South Korea	
Win	4–1	Byung Jo Kim	Submission (kneebar)	G5 Gimme Five	June 5, 2004	3	2:40	Seoul, South Korea	
Win	3–1	Kyung Ho Park	Submission (guillotine choke)	G5 Gimme Five	March 12, 2004	1	1:43	Seoul, South Korea	
Win	2-1	Jae Ho Lee	Submission (kneebar)	G5 Gimme Five	March 6, 2004	2	2:03	Seoul, South Korea	
Loss	1–1	Lim Jae-Suk	Submission (reverse armbar)	NF 1 - Neo Fight 1	August 30, 2003	1	4:25	Seoul, South Korea	
Win	1–0	Young Suk Ko	Submission (reverse armbar)	NF 1 - Neo Fight 1	August 30, 2003	1	3:17	Seoul, South Korea	
